= Vicatan =

Filipino comics artist and novelist

- Born: Vicente Doria Catan Jr. 1948 Philippines
- Died: May 13, 2004 (aged 55–56)

Vincente Doria Catan Jr., known by his pen name Vicatan (1948 – May 13, 2004), was a Filipino comics artist and novelist.

== Biography ==
Vicente Doria Catan Jr. was born in the Philippines and worked in the studio of artist Nestor Redondo. After several years in the Filipino komiks industry, he began to work for U.S. comics publishers including DC Comics and Warren Publishing. Artist and comics historian Gerry Alanguilan noted that "Probably the closest of all [Nestor] Redondo's followers, Vicatan shared the great man's beautifully lush brush strokes but married that style to an ever-so-slightly humorous sensibility." With his pen name Vicatan, he made his U.S. comics debut with the story "Goodbye, Nancy" in House of Secrets #99 (Aug. 1972). He drew stories for various DC Comics titles including Ghosts, G.I. Combat, House of Mystery, Secrets of Haunted House, Sgt. Rock, The Unexpected, and Weird War Tales from 1979 to 1987. Vicatan drew comics adaptations of Billy Budd, Crime and Punishment, Julius Caesar, Macbeth, and Othello for Pendulum Press in 1979 and 1980. Following his final work for DC, Vicatan worked exclusively in the Filipino comics industry. He died on 13 May 2004.

== Bibliography ==
=== Archie Comics ===
- The Fly #4–7 (Jaguar backup stories)(1983–1984)

=== DC Comics ===
- Ghosts #81, 85, 88, 108 (1979–1982)
- G.I. Combat #218, 222–223, 226, 229–230, 232, 234–235, 242–244, 247, 249, 251, 253, 256, 258, 261–263, 265, 267–268, 271–272, 274, 276–281, 286 (Mercenaries backup feature) (1980–1986)
- House of Mystery #320 (1983)
- House of Secrets #99 (1972)
- Secrets of Haunted House #44–46 (1982)
- Sgt. Rock #403, 407, 415–416 (1985–1987)
- Tarzan Family #62–63 (John Carter, Warlord of Mars backup feature) (1976)
- Time Warp #5 (1980)
- The Unexpected #189, 196, 205, 210–211, 216–218, 220–221 (1979–1982)
- Weird War Tales #96, 100–101 (1981)

=== Harris Publications ===
- Creepy #146 (1985)

=== Marvel Comics ===
- Savage Sword of Conan #56 (one page) (1980)

=== Pendulum Press ===
- Billy Budd (1979)
- Crime and Punishment (1979)
- Julius Caesar (1980)
- Macbeth (1980)
- Othello (1980)

=== Renegade Press ===
- Revolver #1 (1985)

=== Warren Publishing ===
- 1984 #10 (1979)
- 1994 #14, 18–20, 24, 26, 28–29 (1980–1983)
- Eerie #136 (1982)
