= Martin Pasko =

Canadian writer and screenwriter (1954–2020)

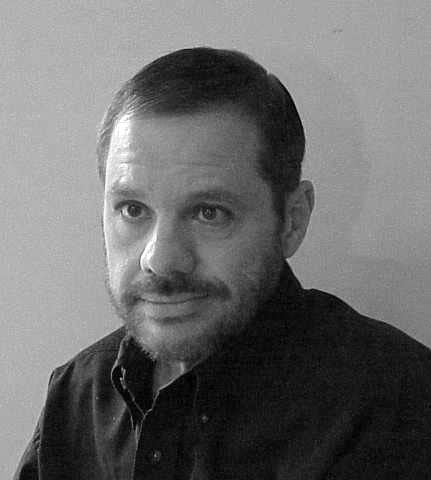
- Born: Jean-Claude Rochefort; August 4, 1954 Montreal, Quebec, Canada
- Died: May 10, 2020 (aged 65) North Hills, California, U.S.
- Area: Writer
- Pseudonyms: Patti Enders; Kyle Christopher; Wyatt Gwyon
- Notable works: Superman; Doctor Fate; The DC Vault; Batman: Mask of the Phantasm (co-writer)
- Awards: Daytime Emmy Award (1993); Inkpot Award (2013); Bill Finger Award for Excellence in Comic Book Writing (2026)

Martin Joseph "Marty" Pasko (born Jean-Claude Rochefort; August 4, 1954 – May 10, 2020) was a Canadian comic book writer and television screenwriter.

Pasko worked for many comics publishers, but is best known for his superhero stories for DC Comics over three decades. He wrote Superman in various media, including television animation, webisodes, and a syndicated newspaper strip for Tribune Media Services, as well as comic books. He also co-created the 1975 revamp of Doctor Fate.

== Early life and education ==
Pasko claimed to have been born as Jean-Claude Rochefort in Montreal, Quebec, Canada. As a teenager, he was a regular contributor to comic book letter columns and co-published a fanzine, Fantazine, with Alan Brennert, who is now a novelist. After attending Northwestern University and New York University, Pasko settled in New York.

== Career ==
=== Comics ===
==== The 1970s ====
Pasko's first published comics writing credit was a short story titled "Package Deal " for Warren Publishing's Creepy #51 (March 1973). His first published work, however, was a story titled "Eye Opener," in Vampirella #20 (October 1972), which was erroneously credited to his friend and professional benefactor, Doug Moench.

Pasko started working for DC Comics and began his long association with Superman in 1973, as a result of his association with long-time editor Julius Schwartz. As a frequent contributor to Schwartz's letter columns, beginning in 1968, Pasko had been nicknamed "Pesky Pasko," in acknowledgment of the fact that his comments were more often than not acutely critical. His campaign to become a "lettercol regular," as a way of breaking into comics writing, was inspired and encouraged by his friend and benefactor, writer Mike Friedrich, who advised Pasko that a name that was recognizable from the letter columns would have an advantage in terms of over-the-transom, or "slush pile," contributions, by being more likely to be read before the submissions of writers unknown to the editor.

Pasko's first Superman-related story was a "Private Life of Clark Kent" backup feature in Superman #277 (July 1974). In addition to writing backup stories and occasional other features in Action Comics during this period, such as The Atom, Pasko was the featured Superman writer from 1977–1979. DC Comics Presents, a team-up title starring Superman, was launched in 1978 by Pasko and artist José Luis García-López. Pasko and Curt Swan created the Atomic Skull in Superman #323 (May 1978) and the Master Jailer in Superman #331 (January 1979). From 1979–1982, Pasko contributed stories to the Superman Family anthology title, including runs as the regular writer of the Jimmy Olsen and Supergirl features. In addition, during 1978 and 1979, Pasko scripted the syndicated newspaper comic strip The World's Greatest Superheroes which initially starred Superman, Batman, Robin, Wonder Woman, and The Flash, but gradually changed its focus to primarily feature Superman.

A solo Doctor Fate story in 1st Issue Special #9 (December 1975), written by Pasko and drawn by Walt Simonson, led to an important development in the life of the character. With this story, Pasko added the concept that the spirit of Nabu resided in Doctor Fate's helmet and took control of Fate's alter-ego Kent Nelson whenever the helmet was donned. In 1981 Roy Thomas incorporated this into his series All-Star Squadron, as an explanation of the changes in Fate's helmet and powers. In 1982, this led to DC featuring Kent and his wife Inza in a series of back-up stories, written by Pasko, in The Flash. DC later collected Pasko's stories into a three-issue limited series titled The Immortal Dr. Fate (Jan. 1985 - March 1985).

Other titles Pasko wrote for DC included Wonder Woman from 1975–1977, featuring a major story arc documenting the heroine's attempt to gain readmission to the Justice League of America. Wonder Woman had quit the organization after renouncing her powers.

Pasko wrote a number of issues of Justice League of America between 1974 and 1977; he was the regular writer of Metal Men in 1976–1977, and wrote all seven published issues of Kobra in 1976–1977, a feature he redeveloped and re-created, loosely based on a significantly-different concept originated by Jack Kirby. The story intended to be Kobra issue #8 appeared as the Batman story in DC Special Series #1. In addition, Pasko wrote a number of issues of Adventure Comics between 1976 and 1980. He wrote a Daredevil prose story for Marvel Novel Series #9 (The Marvel Superheroes) in 1979 under the pseudonym of "Kyle Christopher".

==== The 1980s ====
In his first comics-format work for Marvel Comics, Pasko was the regular scripter of that company's Star Trek comic book in 1980–1981. He helped Alan Brennert enter the comics industry by having Brennert co-write Star Trek #12 (March 1981) for Marvel. Pasko was also a writer of the Star Trek comic strip from late 1982 through early 1983. In 1988, Pasko wrote an issue of the DC Star Trek comic book.

In 1982, Pasko and artist Thomas Yeates revived Swamp Thing, in a new series titled Saga of the Swamp Thing. Pasko left Swamp Thing with issue #19 (Dec. 1983) and was succeeded by Alan Moore, who took the title and the character in a different direction. Pasko wrote a number of issues of the First Comics version of Joe Staton's E-Man in 1983–1984.

In 1988–1989 Pasko was a regular contributor to Action Comics during its stint as a weekly anthology, where he developed a new version of "The Secret Six". He also wrote the "Blackhawk" feature therein, based on the Howard Chaykin retcon, and the subsequent monthly title (1989–1990).

==== The 1990s and 2000s ====
In 1994, he wrote the Marvel Comics licensed series Gargoyles, based on a Disney Television Animation series. He then returned to New York to serve as DC's Group Editor-Mass Market. While that was his official title, within the company he was known as the head of the Special Projects Group. In this capacity, he oversaw the production of DC's custom comics; licensed titles such as the Star Trek line; and various special projects such as the writing of stage and stunt shows for the Six Flags amusement park chain, and the writing and production of various webisodes for Warner Bros. Online. In this capacity, he also co-created, with his staff, and edited the horror satire Gross Point, which ran in 1997-98.

During his decade on staff at DC, Pasko wrote issues of Impulse, one of two stories in the Green Lantern issue of the 2004 Julius Schwartz tribute series DC Comics Presents, and the comics adaptation of the film Superman Returns. Until 2005, he was DC's liaison to Warner Bros. Studios, vetting scripts for WBA animated programming, all feature film, television, and animated development of DC brands, and the live-action series Smallville and Birds of Prey, as well as facilitating studio research by supplying comics and consulting on issues related to DC continuity.

=== Television ===
==== Live action ====
In Los Angeles in the 1980s, Pasko wrote for or served as a writer/story editor on many live-action series, including Buck Rogers in the 25th Century, Fantasy Island, The Twilight Zone (the 1985–1989 CBS revival), Max Headroom, Simon & Simon, and Roseanne. Between 1985 and 1989, Pasko's writing and story editing partner was Rebecca Parr.

The partnership was dissolved in 1989, and Pasko's future TV writing credits were exclusively in animated programming. Parr continued working in sitcoms, notably becoming a writer and executive story consultant on Cheers.

==== Animation ====
Pasko began a long career in television animation in 1980, writing several episodes of Thundarr the Barbarian with Steve Gerber. Pasko's many other animated TV writing credits comprise series such as Teenage Mutant Ninja Turtles, Exosquad, Teen Wolf, Berenstain Bears, G.I. Joe: A Real American Hero, and My Little Pony. Much, although not all, of this work was done in conjunction with Rebecca Parr.

For Thundarr the Barbarian, Pasko came up with the name of Ookla the Mok. In 1980, Gerber and Pasko were having dinner in the Westwood area one night during the period Gerber was writing the "bible" for the series. Gerber commented to Pasko that he had not yet decided upon a name for the Wookiee-like character the network had insisted be added to the series. As the two walked past the gate to the UCLA campus, Pasko quipped, "Why not call him Oo-clah?". After writing several scripts, singly and in collaboration with Gerber, Pasko became a story editor on the second season.

After leaving the sitcom world at the end of the 1980s, Pasko wrote for such series as Bucky O'Hare and the Toad Wars, The Tick, Cadillacs and Dinosaurs (which he redeveloped in order to produce scripts acceptable to the network), and The Legend of Prince Valiant. As well, in the early 1990s, Pasko accepted a job at Disney Consumer Products' startup comic book division, Disney Comics, developing a line of superhero titles and writing the Roger Rabbit comics series. This activity lasted nine months until, in a corporate reorganization, Disney decided to stop publishing comics altogether. The day before he was let go by Disney, Pasko finalized a deal to join Warner Bros. Animation's Batman: The Animated Series as a writer/story editor. For his work on this series, Pasko won a 1993 Daytime Emmy Award. He is a co-writer of the animated feature Batman: Mask of the Phantasm.

=== 2000s work ===
Pasko in the 2000s has worked on nonfiction about various aspects of pop culture history, as a writer-researcher and consultant, as well as writing children's fiction and videogame dramatics. These projects include writing The DC Vault, published in 2008; working on the dramatics for Freaky Creatures, Abandon Interactive Entertainment's massively multiplayer online game; co-writing The Essential Superman Encyclopedia with Robert Greenberger; writing the children's book Superman: Prankster of Prime Time; and acting as researcher, consultant, and supplemental copywriter on 75 Years of DC Comics: The Art of Modern Mythmaking. He was a consultant to numerous independent entertainment companies, including Cryptozoic Entertainment, a gaming company, and a freelance comics writer.

== Personal life ==
Pasko was married for thirty years to Judith Faye (née Silinsky). The couple had one child, Simcha, who is a journalist. They had been separated for ten years at the time of his death.

== Death ==
Pasko died of natural causes on May 10, 2020, at age 65.

== Comics bibliography ==
=== DC Comics ===
- 1st Issue Special #9 (Doctor Fate) (1975)
- Action Comics #438–439, 442, 447–448, 453–454, 465, 468, 500, 524 (1974–1981)
- Action Comics Weekly #601–612, 615–634 (1988–1989)
- Adventure Comics #445–448, 469–473, 475–478 (1976–1980)
- Alien Nation #1 (1988)
- Batman #256 (two page feature) (1974)
- The Batman Adventures #4–5 (1993)
- Blackhawk vol. 2 #1–11, Annual #1 (1989–1990)
- The Brave and the Bold #165, 176, 179 (1980–1981)
- DC Comics Presents #1–2, 9, 35, 38–39, 41 (1978–1982)
- DC Comics Presents: Green Lantern #1 (2004)
- DC Retroactive: Superman – The '70s #1 (2011)
- DC Special Series #1, 5 (1977)
- DC Super Stars #18 (1978)
- Detective Comics #458–459, 490–491 (1976–1980)
- The Flash #306–313 (Doctor Fate backup stories) (1982)
- Freedom Fighters #1, 3–4 (1976)
- Ghosts #44 (1975)
- Gross Point #2–3 (1997)
- House of Mystery #226, 277 (1974–1980)
- House of Secrets #122 (1974)
- Impulse #7, 18 (1995–1996)
- The Joker vol. 1 #5, 10 (1976)
- Justice League of America #111–112 (two page features), #122, 128–130, 135–137, 147–148 (1974–1977)
- Kamandi #43, 45 (1976)
- Kobra #1–7 (1976–1977)
- Man-Bat #2 (1976)
- Metal Men #48–53 (1976–1977)
- The New Adventures of Superboy #25 (1982)
- Plop! #24 (1976)
- Robotech: Love & War #5 (text article) (2003)
- Saga of the Swamp Thing #1–13, 16–19 (1982–1983)
- Secret Origins vol. 2 #45 (Blackhawk) (1989)
- Secrets of Haunted House #7 (1977)
- Star Trek #56 (1988)
- Strange Sports Stories #5–6 (1974)
- Super Friends #43, 45 (Plastic Man) (1981)
- Superman #277, 280, 282, 285–286, 292, 294, 305–306, 310–335, 349, 367 (1974–1982)
- The Superman Family #184–185, 195, 209–216 (1977–1982)
- Superman Returns: The Movie and Other Tales of the Man of Steel #1 (2006)
- Tales of Ghost Castle #1 (1975)
- The Unexpected #190, 222 (1982)
- Weird War Tales #113 (1982)
- Wonder Woman #218–224, 226–232 (1975–1977)
- World's Finest Comics #273 (Plastic Man) (1981)

=== Disney Comics ===
- Roger Rabbit #10, 13–14, 16, 18 (1991)

=== Eclipse Comics ===
- Destroyer Duck #1 (1982)

=== First Comics ===
- E-Man #1–3, 5–8, 10 (1983–1984)

=== Marvel Comics ===
- Gargoyles #1–6 (1995)
- Star Trek #8–9, 11–16 (1980–1981)

=== Seaboard ===
- Weird Tales of the Macabre #1 (1975)

=== Warren Publishing ===
- Creepy #51, 63 (1973–1974)
- Vampirella #36 (1974)

== Television and film credits ==
=== Television ===
• series head writer credits are denoted in bold

- Buck Rogers in the 25th Century (1980)
- Thundarr the Barbarian (1980)
- Blackstar (1981)
- Goldie Gold and Action Jack (1981)
- The Incredible Hulk (1982)
- Fantasy Island (1983)
- **Mister T** (1983): seasons 1-2
- The Berenstain Bears (1985)
- G.I. Joe: A Real American Hero (1985)
- The Twilight Zone (1985)
- My Little Pony (1986)
- Max Headroom (1987)
- Superman (1988)
- Simon & Simon (1988)
- Teenage Mutant Ninja Turtles (1988, 1990)
- Free Spirit (1989)
- Roseanne (1989)
- Bucky O'Hare and the Toad Wars! (1991)
- The Legend of Prince Valiant (1991–1992)
- **Batman: The Animated Series** (1992–1993)
- **Cadillacs and Dinosaurs** (1993)
- The Tick (1994)
- Mega Man (1994)
- Exosquad (1994)
- Skysurfer Strike Force (1995): as Kyle Christopher
- Cannon Busters (2019)

=== Film ===
- Batman: Mask of the Phantasm (1993)

| Preceded by Elliot S. Maggin | Wonder Woman writer 1975–1977 | Succeeded by Gerry Conway |
| Preceded by Gerry Conway | Superman writer 1977–1979 | Succeeded by Len Wein |
| Preceded by n/a | Saga of the Swamp Thing writer 1982–1983 | Succeeded by Alan Moore |
| Preceded by Howard Chaykin | Blackhawk writer 1989–1990 | Succeeded by Doug Moench |
