= Alex Niño =

Filipino comics artist (born 1940)

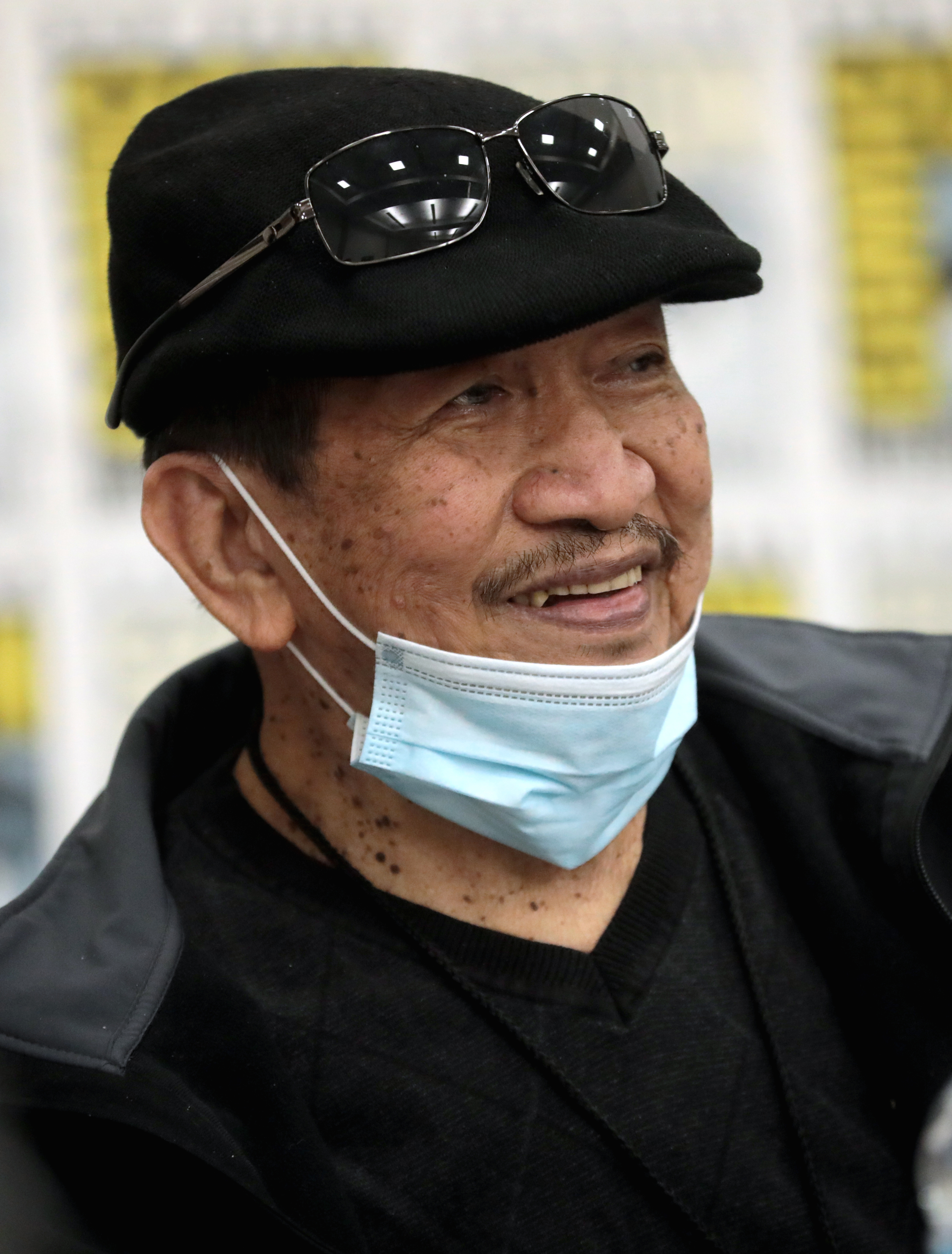
- Niño at the 2021 San Diego Comic-Con
- Born: May 1, 1940 (age 86) Tarlac, Central Luzon, the Philippines
- Area: Artist
- Notable works: 1984; Heavy Metal; House of Mystery; House of Secrets; Unknown Worlds of Science Fiction; Weird War Tales
- Awards: Inkpot Award 1976

Alex Niño (born May 1, 1940) is a Filipino comics artist best known for his work for the American publishers DC Comics, Marvel Comics, and Warren Publishing, and in Heavy Metal magazine.

== Biography ==
=== Early life and career ===
Alex Niño was born May 1, 1940, in Tarlac, Central Luzon, the Philippines, the son of a professional photographer. Niño studied medicine briefly at the University of Manila before leaving in 1959 to pursue his childhood goal of becoming a comics artist. In 1965, after studying under artist Jess Jodloman, Niño collaborated with Clodualdo del Mundo Sr. to create the feature "Kilabot Ng Persia" ("The Terror of Persia") for Pilipino Komiks. Niño and Marcelo B. Isidro later created the feature "Dinoceras" for Redondo Komiks. Other Valry Philippine work includes the series Gruaga - The Fifth Corner of the World for Pioneer Komiks; the feature "Mga Matang Nagliliyab" ("The Eyes that Glow in the Dark") with Isidro for Alcala Komiks; and for PSG Publications, stories of Bruhilda Witch, which were adapted into movies.

=== DC Comics ===
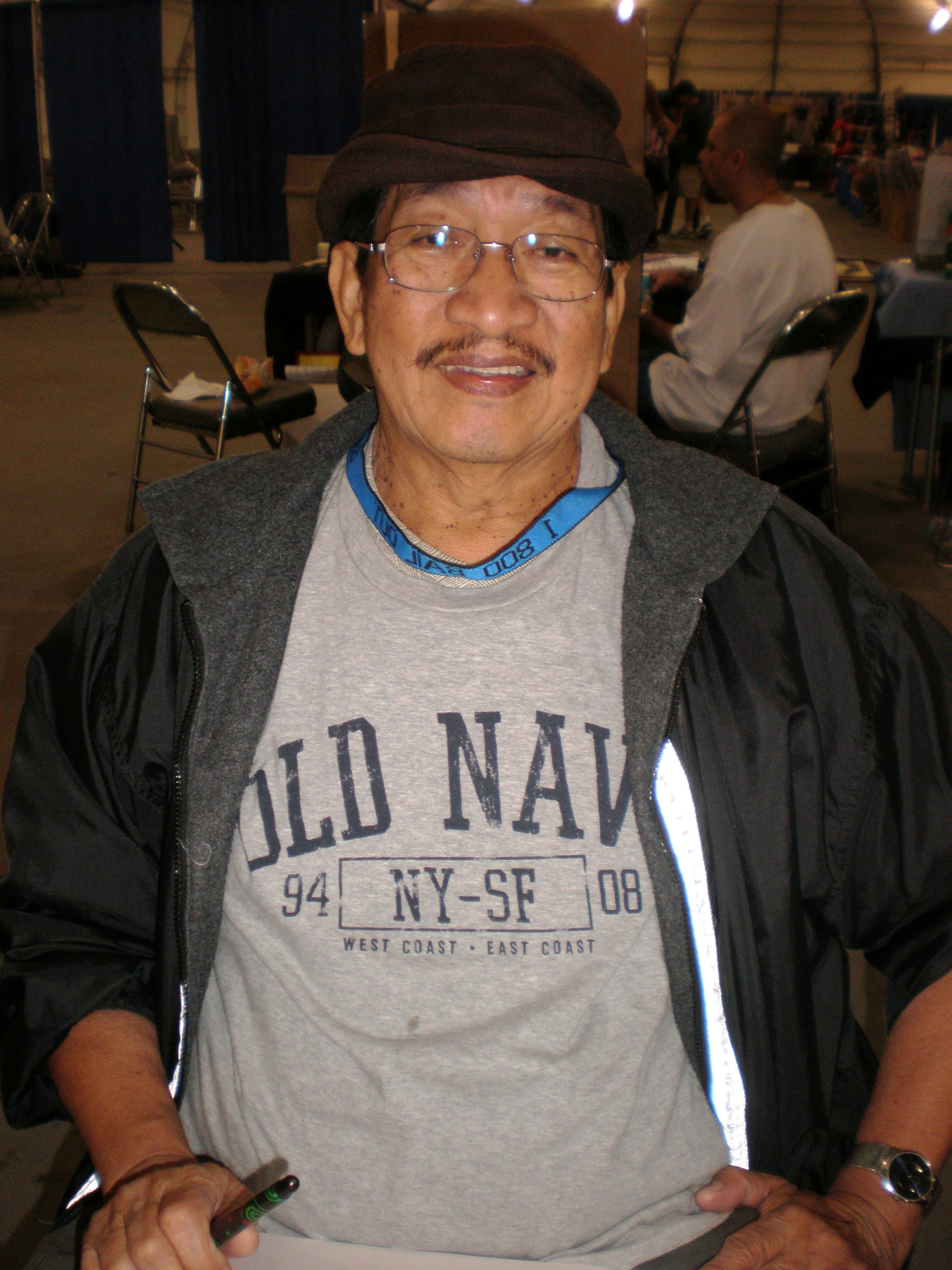
Niño in May 2009

Niño was among the vanguard of Philippine comics artists — including Alfredo Alcala, Nestor Redondo, and Gerry Talaoc — recruited for American comic books by DC Comics editor Joe Orlando and publisher Carmine Infantino in 1971, following the success of the pioneering Tony DeZuniga. Niño's earliest U.S. comics credit is penciling and inking the nine-page story "To Die for Magda" in DC Comics' House of Mystery #204 (July 1972) written by Carl Wessler. Niño was soon contributing regularly to such other DC supernatural anthologies as companion title House of Secrets and Forbidden Tales of Dark Mansion, Secrets of Sinister House, Weird War Tales, Weird Mystery Tales, and The Witching Hour. He also drew the jungle-adventure feature "Korak" in some issues of DC's Tarzan. Except for one story for Gold Key Comics' Mystery Comics Digest #17 (May 1974), Niño, who moved to the U.S. in 1974, drew comics exclusively for DC through the beginning of 1975.

With writer-editor Robert Kanigher, Niño created DC's 19th-century Caribbean-pirate protagonist Captain Fear in Adventure Comics #425 (Dec. 1972). Niño and writer Jack Oleck created the science-fiction feature "Space Voyagers" in Rima, the Jungle Girl #1 (May 1974).

In 1973–1974, Niño worked for Pendulum Press, illustrating comic book adaptations of the classic literary works The Time Machine, Moby-Dick, The Three Musketeers, The Invisible Man, and The War of the Worlds. In 1976, several of these stories were reprinted, with added color, by Marvel Comics in their Marvel Classics Comics line.

=== Marvel Comics ===
After drawing some house ads and a frontispiece for two of Marvel Comics' black-and-white comics magazines, Niño teamed with writer-editor Roy Thomas on a 17-page adaptation of the Harlan Ellison short story "'Repent, Harlequin!' Said the Ticktockman" in the black-and-white Unknown Worlds of Science Fiction #3 (May 1975). This led to a 30-page Conan the Barbarian tale, "People of the Dark" in The Savage Sword of Conan #6 (June 1975), also with Thomas, and a 23-page adaptation of the Michael Moorcock novel Behold the Man, with writer Doug Moench in Unknown Worlds of Science Fiction #6 (Nov. 1975).

Niño signed a contract with Ralph Bakshi to work on the film Wizards, and was granted a work visa, but was unable to gain permission from the Philippine government in order to leave for the United States until two months afterward. By the time he had arrived in the U.S., not only had the film's animation been completed, but Niño's visa did not allow him to submit freelance work on any other projects.

Niño did little else for Marvel's color comics, inking two issues of the Luke Cage series Power Man and a "Weirdworld" story in Marvel Premiere #38 (Sept. 1977).

=== Warren and Heavy Metal ===
Heavy Metal #11 (Feb. 1978). Cover art by Niño

Niño instead found his niche in the mature-audience horror and science-fiction/fantasy fare of Warren Publishing's black-and-white comics magazines Creepy, Eerie, 1984, and Vampirella, and HM Communications' pioneering Heavy Metal, a color comics magazine that blended imported European art-comics with new American work. From 1977 through 1984, Niño drew numerous stories, covers, and incidental art for those publishers, mixed with very occasional stories for DC Comics' supernatural-anthology titles, and some minor work for the short-lived Archie Comics superhero titles The Comet and Shield - Steel Sterling.

=== Later life and career ===
In 1984, he replaced Trevor Von Eeden as artist on DC's Thriller series. Niño's mid-1980s work for DC included a rare foray into superhero titles including Action Comics, Batman Annual, Fury of Firestorm, Justice League of America, and The Omega Men. He and writer Arthur Byron Cover created the "Space Clusters" for DC Graphic Novel #7 (1986). Later 1980s work includes issues of New Comics Group's Asylum, World of Young Master Special, and Demon Blade, and Fantagor Press' Den. Niño both wrote and drew a single-issue occult adventure, Alex Niño Nightmare #1 (Dec. 1989), for Innovation Comics.

Essentially leaving comics for four years, Niño returned to do minor work for Dark Horse Comics' Dark Horse Presents, Continuity Comics' Shaman and Big Entertainment's John Jakes' Mullkon Empire #4, and to re-team with writer Roy Thomas for the 37-page Conan the Barbarian story "Lions of Corinthia" in The Savage Sword of Conan #228 (Dec. 1994). Leaving comics again the following year, Niño returned in 1999 to write and draw a story each in Quantum Cat Entertainment's Frank Frazetta Fantasy Illustrated #7-8 (July & Sept. 1999).

After another hiatus from comics, during which time he worked on designs for the Walt Disney Pictures animated feature Atlantis: The Lost Empire (2001), Niño returned to draw Bliss on Tap Publishing's four-issue series God the Dyslexic Dog (July 2004). In 2008, Niño drew the three-issue miniseries Dead Ahead, by writers Mel Smith and Clark Castillo for Image Comics. Niño collaborated with writer Jeff Lemire on a story for Batman Black and White vol. 2 #2 (Dec. 2013).

Though now officially retired, Niño continues to produce artwork for commissions, attend fan conventions, and teaches art classes every year back in the Philippines. In 2015, he self-published a collection of artwork, Art Quest of Alex Niño available from his website.

== Awards ==
Niño received an Inkpot Award in 1976.

== Legacy ==
Comics artist Whilce Portacio was influenced by Niño, saying, "I was exposed to Alex Niño's super-stylized artwork and that had a major influence on me. The design sense and the limitless imagination of Alex Niño really got me inspired to let my creative side imagine new worlds and characters.

== Bibliography ==
=== Book cover / interior illustrations ===
- The Time Machine (Pendulum Press, 1973)
- Moby-Dick (Pendulum Press / Now Age Illustrated, 1973) ISBN 0-88301-099-2, ISBN 978-0-88301-099-0 (re-issued by Educational Insights, 1998) ISBN 1-56767-235-3, ISBN 978-1-56767-235-0
- The Three Musketeers (Pendulum Press, 1974)
- The Invisible Man (Pendulum Press, 1974)
- The War of the Worlds (Pendulum Press, 1974)
- Weird Heroes: Vol. 1 (Berkley Publishing Group, 1975)
- Weird Heroes: Vol. 3: Quest of the Gypsy (Pyramid Books, 1976)
- "The Weird Tales Story" -Chapter Heading Designs (Wildside Press, 1977) ISBN 1-58715-101-4
- Satan's Tears: The Art of Alex Niño (The Land of Enchantment, 1977)
- Rebel Spy (Be an Interplanetary Spy) (Bantam Books, 1984) ISBN 0-553-24198-2, ISBN 978-0-553-24198-3
- The Vulgmaster (Tales of the One-Eyed Crow) (Roc, 1991) ISBN 0-451-45088-4, ISBN 978-0-451-45088-3
- Graphic Classics volume 3: H. G. Wells (Eureka Productions, 2002) ISBN 0-9712464-3-2, ISBN 978-0-9712464-3-0
- "REH: A Short Biography of Robert E. Howard" (1999)
- Alex Niño Drawings (Stuart Ng Books, 2005)
- The Orc's Treasure (I Books, 2006) ISBN 0-7434-7943-2, ISBN 978-0-7434-7943-1
- "Jack London's Call of the Wild: The Graphic Novel" (Puffin Graphics, 2006) ISBN 0-14-240571-X
- The Art of Alex Niño (Auad Publishing, 2008) ISBN 978-0-9669381-6-6
- Sketchbook Alex Niño (Auad Publishing, n.d.)
- Art Quest of Alex Niño vol. 1 (self-published, 2015)
- Art Quest of Alex Nino vol. 2 (self-published, 2020)

=== Comic books ===
==== Archie Comics ====
- Blue Ribbon Comics #2 (inks over Trevor Von Eeden) (1983)
- Comet #1–2 (inks over Carmine Infantino) (1983)
- Shield - Steel Sterling #3 (1983)

==== Big Entertainment ====
- John Jakes' Mullkon Empire #4–5 (1995)

==== Bliss On Tap Publishing ====
- Monster Candy (2015)
- The Legion of Molly Doves # 1 (2013)
- Andie and the Alien #1 (2011)
- God the Dyslexic Dog #1–4 (2004–2005) — collected as God the Dyslexic Dog (2006) graphic novel with 24 pages of extra artwork

==== Byblos Productions ====
- Tarzan Weekly (1977) ("Zuflager the Loyal")

==== Continuity Comics ====
- Shaman #0 (1994)

==== Dark Horse Comics ====
- Dark Horse Comics #15–16 (inks over Ted Naifeh) (1993)

==== DC Comics ====
- Action Comics #568 (inks over Howard Bender) (1985)
- Adventure Comics #425–427, 429, 432–433 (Captain Fear) (1972–1974)
- Batman Annual #9 (1985)
- Batman Black and White vol. 2 #2 (2013)
- DC Graphic Novel #7 ("Space Clusters") (1986)
- DC Special Series #4, 7 (1977)
- Forbidden Tales of Dark Mansion #8, 12, 15 (1972–1974)
- Fury of Firestorm #37 (full art); #31 (inks over George Tuska) (1985)
- Ghosts #35, 37, 57 (1975–1977)
- House of Mystery #204, 212–213, 220, 224–225, 245, 250, 252–256, 283 (1972–1980)
- House of Secrets #101, 103, 106, 109, 115, 117, 126, 128, 131, 147, 153 (1972–1978)
- Justice League of America #228 (inks over George Tuska) (1984)
- Omega Men #16, 21 (full art); Annual #1 (inks over Tod Smith) (1984)
- Rima, the Jungle Girl #1–5 ("Space Voyagers" backup feature) (1974–1975)
- Secrets of Haunted House #1, 13, 19 (1975–1979)
- Secrets of Sinister House #8, 11–13 (1972–1973)
- Tales of Ghost Castle #2 (1975)
- Tarzan #231–234 (Korak, Son of Tarzan backup feature) (1974–1975)
- Thriller #9–12 (1984)
- The Unexpected #152, 159, 162 (1973–1975)
- Weird Mystery Tales #5–6, 9, 13, 16, 21 (1973–1975)
- Weird War Tales #9, 11, 13, 16, 23–25, 31, 36, 55, 61, 69–70 (1972–1978)
- The Witching Hour #31, 40, 45, 47 (1973–1974)

==== Fantagor Press ====
- Den #9–10 (1989)

==== HM Communications, Inc. ====
- Heavy Metal vol.1, #11; vol. 2, #1–4, #8, #11; vol. 4, #9; vol. 7, #10 (1978–1984)
- Heavy Metal Presents Theodore Sturgeon's More Than Human GN (co-published with Simon & Schuster, 1979) — adaptation by Doug Moench; originally published in Heavy Metal

==== Image Comics ====
- Dead Ahead #1–3 (2008–2010)
- Dead Ahead Graphic Novel, collects #1–3 (2012 Acme Ink)

==== Innovation Publishing ====
- Alex Niño’s Nightmare #1 (1989)

==== Marvel Comics ====
- Captain America: Red, White & Blue #1 (one page) (2002)
- The Incredible Hulk vol. 2 #94 (2006)
- John Carter, Warlord of Mars #3 (one page) (1977)
- Marvel Classics Comics #2 (The Time Machine); #8 (Moby-Dick); #12 (The Three Musketeers) (1976)
- Marvel Premiere #38 (Weirdworld) (inks over Mike Ploog) (1977)
- Marvel Preview #1 ("Man-Gods from Beyond the Stars") (1975)
- Power Man #42–43 (inks over Lee Elias) (1977)
- The Rampaging Hulk #4 (inks over Jim Starlin) (1977)
- Savage Sword of Conan #6, 228 (1975–1994)
- Unknown Worlds of Science Fiction #3, 6, Annual #1 (1975–1976)

==== Warren Publishing ====
- 1984 #1–10 (1978–1979)
- 1994 #11–26, 28 (1980–1982)
- Creepy #94, 96–97, 100–101, 104–105, 108, 112, 116, 119, 125, 143 (full art); #89, 93 (inks over Carmine Infantino) (1977–1982)
- Eerie #87, 90, 92–93, 95 (1977–1978)
- The Goblin #3 (inks over Lee Elias) (1982)
- The Rook Magazine #1 (1979)
- Vampirella #67, 76, 85 (full art); #59, 61 (inks over Carmine Infantino) (1977–1980)
- Warren Presents #3 Alien Invasion Comix (1979)
- Warren Presents: Future World Comix #1 (1978)

==== Western Publishing ====
- Mystery Comics Digest #17 (1974)
- The Twilight Zone #65 (1975)
