= Tom Sutton =

American cartoonist (1937–2002)

- Born: Thomas F. Sutton; April 15, 1937 North Adams, Massachusetts, U.S.
- Died: May 1, 2002 (aged 65) Amesbury, Massachusetts, U.S.
- Area: Artist
- Pseudonyms: Sean Todd, Dementia, TFS

Thomas F. Sutton (April 15, 1937 – May 1, 2002) was an American comic book artist who sometimes used the pseudonyms Sean Todd and Dementia. He is best known for his contributions to Marvel Comics and Warren Publishing's line of black-and-white horror-comics magazines, particularly as the first story-artist of the popular character Vampirella.

== Biography ==
=== Early life and career ===
Tom Sutton was born and raised in North Adams, Massachusetts, where father Harry was a plumbing, heating and air conditioning shopkeeper, and a machinist and gunsmith for General Electric and others. He had a half-sister "seven or eight years older than I am" from his widower father's first marriage.

He enlisted in the U.S. Air Force after graduating from high school in 1955, and worked on art projects while stationed at Fort Francis E. Warren, near Laramie, Wyoming. Later, stationed at Itami base in Japan, Sutton created the Caniff-style adventure strip F.E.A.F Dragon for a base publication. Sutton's first professional comics work, it led to a long-hoped-for placement on the military's Stars and Stripes newspaper.

At the Tokyo office of Stars and Stripes, he drew the comic strip Johnny Craig, a character name inspired by the EC artist Johnny Craig. Sutton recalled that he worked on this strip "for two years and some odd months. I did it seven days a week, I think. It was all stupid. It was a kind of cheap version of [Frank Robbins'] Johnny Hazard, I think it was".

On his return to civilian life in 1959, Sutton lived and worked in San Francisco, where, he said, "There were some publications ... that I sold or gave artwork to." After six months he moved to Jacksonville, Vermont, where his parents were at the time. In about 1960 he began attending the School of the Museum of Fine Arts, Boston on either a scholarship or the G.I. Bill – Sutton was unclear on this in a 2001 interview – and studied there for two-and-a-half years while freelancing in commercial art for the likes of small ad agencies. Sutton became an art director at a company called AVP, and was the animation director for Transradio Productions, among many other jobs that included graphics work on a Radio Shack catalog.

He married his first wife, Beverly, in the early 1960s and his two sons were born soon thereafter; the marriage lasted approximately five years. After the divorce his wife remarried and Sutton lost contact with his sons; he later reconnected with one of them, Todd. During the late 1960s, Sutton was living in Boston's North End. He married second wife Donna and in 1970 they moved to Newburyport, Massachusetts. Later Sutton lived in Newburyport with his third wife, Charlotte, who ran a Montessori school for little people in the first floor of their Victorian house. In the 1990s, he moved to Amesbury, Massachusetts.

=== Warren and Marvel ===
Tom Sutton's cover for Creepy #22 (Aug. 1968)

Sutton's first two comic-book stories appeared the same month. His first sale, "The Monster from One Billion B.C.", was published in Warren Publishing's black-and-white horror-comics magazine Eerie #11 (Sept. 1967), though it was originally commissioned for Famous Monsters of Filmland (where it was reprinted four months later). He also illustrated the five-page anthological Western story "The Wild Ones", written by Sol Brodsky, in Marvel's Kid Colt, Outlaw #137 (Sept. 1967). It was one of many Westerns he drew for the company, including the introduction of the short-lived feature "Renegades"—The Fugitive times four, in the Old West—in Western Gunfighters #1 (Aug. 1970).

As Sutton recalled his breaking into Marvel, editor-in-chief Stan Lee

...looked at the stuff that I had brought in, [which was] stuff that I had done in the service for Stars and Stripes in Tokyo. I think he was rather impressed by the fact that I had actually done a daily comic strip for two years. He didn't get many people who had done that. ... He just reached over and he pulled off this huge pile of blank paper. And he said, 'OK, do me a couple of Westerns and I'll see you next week. Have fun.' I remember that very well. 'Have fun.'

Sutton soon developed a trademark frantic, cartoony style that, when juxtaposed on dramatic narratives, gave his work a vibrant, quirky dynamism. That distinctive style helped establish the popular supernatural character Vampirella from her first story, "Vampirella of Draculona", written by Forrest J Ackerman, with costume design by artist Trina Robbins, in Vampirella #1 (Sept. 1969). Later, with writer Archie Goodwin, Sutton helped transition Vampi from cheeky horror hostess to serious dramatic character in the 21-page story "Who Serves the Cause of Chaos?" in issue #8 (Nov. 1970, reprinted in color in Harris Comics' 1995 Vampirella Classics series).

Though well-suited to horror stories, Sutton was also admired for his work on such science fiction series as Marvel's Planet of the Apes magazine and First Comics' Grimjack and Squalor, and for the humor title Not Brand Echh, on which he appeared in nearly every issue with parodies of Marvel's own characters. He was not especially equipped to do superheroes, either by art style or temperament, once calling them "fascist". While he lent a hand very occasionally, Sutton stayed mostly on Marvel's supernatural heroes: Werewolf by Night, Ghost Rider, and Doctor Strange (in the 1970s series, plus Baron Mordo backup stories in the 1980s Doctor Strange, Sorcerer Supreme). With writer Steve Englehart, penciler Sutton introduced the new furrily transformed X-Men character the Beast, who starred in a superhero feature in Amazing Adventures #11–15 (March–Sept. 1972).

A series in the 1970s black-and-white comics magazine Planet of the Apes, a licensed spin-off of the movie series, done with writer Doug Moench, was "recognized by many as Sutton's best", said comics historian and columnist Tom Spurgeon:

Together, they created the 'Future Chronicles' stories for Marvel's Planet of the Apes magazine. [For this] enormously elaborate and cleverly designed fantasy saga set on the world featured in the movies, Sutton worked with oversized originals to better show off his mixed-media work and allow for meticulous detail. The result was a lush, moody, and striking fantasy story to stand with any in mainstream comics history. ' He really made the work a joy, and pure fun,' Moench told [The Comics] Journal. ' This guy was so into the "Future Chronicles", he wanted to put so much detail into it, he worked on these gigantic boards. It was [a] black-and-white [magazine], so it was already bigger than regular comics pages. Then he did that series twice up, these enormous things that would cover my desk. Right there it made it something special, the sheer physical size of it. The enthusiasm you could see in every brushstroke just made it so exciting'.

Original art splash page, Werewolf by Night #9 (Sept. 1973), one of two issues Sutton penciled and inked

For the horror-oriented Warren, Sutton drew dozens of stories early in his career. He moonlighted for Warren competitor Skywald Publications, drawing the Frankenstein-novel sequel "Frankenstein, Book II" (serialized in Psycho magazine #3–6, May, 1971 – May 1972)—using the pseudonym "Sean Todd" (writer-penciler Sutton and inkers Dan Adkins, Jack Abel and Sutton himself), to avoid the wrath of publisher James Warren. A separate story in Psycho #4, written by Sutton and drawn by him and Syd Shores, was credited as "Larry Todd" (writer) and "David Cook" (art). This was the result of someone having inadvertently inserted the name of real-life writer Larry Todd rather than usual pseudonym Sean Todd.

For Skywald's short-lived line of color comics, Sutton wrote and drew stories for the Western title Butch Cassidy and the horror title The Heap (no relation to the 1940s–50s Hillman Periodicals character later revived by Eclipse Comics). He drew Marvel's similar muck-monster Man-Thing as eight-page installments in the omnibus series Marvel Comics Presents during the late 1980s.

=== Later life and career ===
Living in Mystic, Connecticut, at some point, Sutton in the mid-1970s to early 1980s wrote and drew horror stories for the Derby, Connecticut-based Charlton Comics, including for such titles as Ghost Manor, Midnight Tales, Monster Hunters and The Many Ghosts of Doctor Graves, also painting covers for some of these titles. He drew Marvel Premiere #50 (Oct. 1979) which featured rock musician Alice Cooper as a comics character. In the mid-1980s, Sutton drew suspense stories for DC Comics' House of Secrets and House of Mystery which included the "I…Vampire" feature with writer J. M. DeMatteis. DeMatteis stated in a 2017 interview that he "thought [Sutton] was perfect for the series. His work dripped with mood and mystery. And he was a rock–solid storyteller." Sutton was one of the artists on Batman #400 (Oct. 1986) and he penciled virtually all 56 issues of DC's licensed series Star Trek (1984–1988), a period in which, he said, "I know I was becoming an alcoholic." The desire to continue drawing, he said, overcame the urge to drink:

[Y]ou can be drunk as a fucking skunk and there's a little voice that goes off in your head that says, "Would you like to draw pictures, or would you like to be drunk face down in the gutter? Choose one." Those are the only two chances you've got. I had my own little miracle. I thank God for it to this day. I'm not making a big thing out of it. The only reason I even talk about it is the fact that I think there are other people out there who need to know this. That you can save yourself. You go to AA, and eh. I couldn't stick with AA. Other people, that's a great place for them. ... I ran out of bars. One by one, and there must have been a dozen in Newberryport, I was a persona non grata at ever single one of them [and] ... I would never sit home and drink. I had to have an audience.

Late in life, Sutton did commercial art for New England advertising agencies, and under his "Dementia" pseudonym, which he adopted in 1994, he drew for Fantagraphics' Eros Comix line of adult comics. He was also a painter who had gallery showings of his bar-scene canvases. A limited-edition portfolio of six H. P. Lovecraft-inspired fantasy prints, The Dream-Quest of Unknown Kadath, was produced in 1978 and reprinted in the 2002 book Graphic Classics: H. P. Lovecraft.

Police found Sutton dead of an apparent heart attack in his Amesbury apartment on May 3, 2002; it is unclear whether a medical examiner's determination of time or date of death was reported; the Social Security Death Index confirms his death as May 1, 2002. Eros' Dementia's Dirty Girls #1 (May 2002) included a tribute by Bill Pearson.

== Bibliography ==
=== Atlas/Seaboard Comics ===
- Tales of Evil #2 (1975)

=== Charlton Comics ===
- Attack #9–10, 13, 35 (1972–1982)
- Battlefield Action #72, 78 (1981–1982)
- Beyond the Grave #9, 14 (1983–1984)
- Billy the Kid #111, 130 (1975–1979)
- Charlton Classics #8 (1981)
- Creepy Things #1–6 (1975–1976)
- E-Man #1 (1973)
- Fightin' Army #108, 111, 113–114, 117, 126, 128, 137–138, 140, 161 (1973–1982)
- Fightin' Marines #107, 116–117, 119, 134, 141–142, 160, 166 (1972–1982)
- For Lovers Only #83 (1976)
- Ghost Manor #8–9, 17–19, 23, 25, 27–28, 31, 40, 42–43, 45, 47, 50, 61, 67, 71, 76 (1972–1984)
- Ghostly Haunts #33, 37–41, 49, 55, 57 (1973–1978)
- Ghostly Tales #100, 105–108, 110–115, 123–124, 127, 130, 135, 138–140, 148, 150, 152, 162–163, 166, 169 (1972–1984)
- Haunted #10, 15, 17, 20–27, 29, 31, 35–39, 42, 44–45, 52, 54–58, 61–62, 64, 66–68, 70, 73 (1973–1984)
- Haunted Love #1, 3, 5–6, 9–11 (1973–1975)
- I Love You #116, 118 (1976)
- Love Diary #97, 99 (1976)
- The Many Ghosts of Dr. Graves #35, 39, 42, 44–45, 47–50, 52, 54–56, 60–61, 65, 70 (1972–1982)
- Midnight Tales #2–10, 15 (1973–1975)
- Monster Hunters #2–8, 16–18, 20 (1975–1979)
- Scary Tales #2–4, 9, 13, 29, 33, 35–36, 43, 46 (1975–1984)
- Secret Romance #37 (1976)
- Secrets of Young Brides #4, 6 (1976)
- Space War #30, 33 (1978–1979)
- Space: 1999 #1 (1975)
- Teen Confessions #94–95 (1976)
- Time for Love #46 (1976)
- War #3, 5, 14, 16 (1975–1979)

=== Dark Horse Comics ===
- Creepy:The Limited Series #1 (inks over Kieron Dwyer) (1992)

=== DC Comics ===
- Animal Man #60, 71, Annual #1 (inks over Russell Braun) (1993–1994)
- Batman #400 (1986)
- DC Special Series #12 (1978)
- Doctor Fate Annual #1 (1989)
- Doom Patrol vol. 2 #70 (inks over Scot Eaton) 71–72, 74 (inks over Linda Medley) (1993–1994)
- The Hacker Files #1–12 (1992–1993)
- Hellblazer #44–45 (inks over Will Simpson) (1991)
- House of Mystery #189, 271, 298, 303; "I…Vampire": #290–291, 293, 295, 297, 299, 302, 306–309, 314, 319 (full art); #310–313 (inks over Adrian Gonzales); #315–317 (inks over Paris Cullins); #318 (inks over Dan Day) (1970-1983)
- House of Secrets #154 (1978)
- Mystery in Space #112 (1980)
- Our Fighting Forces #144 (1973)
- Secrets of Haunted House #45 (1982)
- Star Hunters #6–7 (inks over Rich Buckler) (1978)
- Star Spangled War Stories #168 (1973)
- Star Trek #1–6, 8–18, 20–27, 29, 31–34, 39–52, 55 (1984–1988)
- Star Trek Movie Special #1–2 (adaptations of Star Trek III: The Search for Spock and Star Trek IV: The Voyage Home) (1984–1987)
- Swamp Thing vol. 2 #98 (1990)
- Time Warp #1–3 (1979–1980)
- Weird War Tales #66, 87, 91–92, 103 (1978–1981)
- Who's Who in Star Trek #1–2 (1987)
- Who's Who in the DC Universe #2 (1990)
- Who's Who in the DC Universe Update 1993 #1 (1992)
- Who's Who: The Definitive Directory of the DC Universe #11 (1986)

==== Paradox Press ====
- The Big Book of Bad (1998)
- The Big Book of Freaks (1996)
- The Big Book of Grimm (1999)
- The Big Book of Hoaxes (1996)
- The Big Book of Little Criminals (1996)
- The Big Book of Losers (1997)
- The Big Book of Martyrs (1997)
- The Big Book of the '70s (2000)
- The Big Book of the Unexplained (1997)
- The Big Book of the Weird Wild West (1998)
- The Big Book of Thugs (1996)
- The Big Book of Vice (1999)
- The Big Book of Weirdos (1995)

=== First Comics ===
- Grimjack #20–23, 25–28 (1986)
- Mars #2–3, 5–7 (1984)
- Squalor #1–4 (1989–1990)
- Starslayer #20–22, 24–27, 29–33 (1984–1985)

=== Marvel Comics ===
- Amazing Adventures #11–15 (Beast) (1972)
- Arrgh! #1–3 (full art); #1 (inks over Mike Sekowsky) (1974–1975)
- Astonishing Tales #8 (inks over Herb Trimpe); #15 (inks over Gil Kane) (1971–1972)
- The Avengers #99 (inks over Barry Windsor Smith) (1972)
- Captain America #244 (inks over Don Perlin) (1980)
- Captain Marvel #15 (1969)
- Chamber of Darkness #1, 4, 7 (1969–1970)
- Conan the Barbarian #8 (inks over Barry Windsor Smith) (1971)
- Daredevil Annual #6 (1990)
- Doctor Strange vol. 2 #27–30, 33–35 (full art); #31 (inks over Ricardo Villamonte) (1978–1979)
- Doctor Strange, Sorcerer Supreme #6–8 (1989)
- Dracula Lives #12 (1975)
- Fantastic Four Annual #15 (1980)
- Ghost Rider vol. 2 #1, 66 (full art); #44 (inks over Carmine Infantino); 64–65 (inks over Jack Sparling) (1973–1982)
- Giant-Size Conan #1–3 (inks over Gil Kane) (1974–1975)
- Giant-Size Man-Thing #5 (inks over Ed Hannigan) (1975)
- Godzilla, King of the Monsters #4–5 (1977)
- John Carter, Warlord of Mars #7 (inks over Gil Kane) (1977)
- Kid Colt, Outlaw #136–137 (1967)
- Logan's Run #6–7 (1977)
- Man from Atlantis #1 (1978)
- Man-Thing #13 (inks over John Buscema) (1975)
- Marvel Comics Presents #1–9, 12, 17, 101–105 (full art); #9 (inks over Brad Joyce); #10–11 (inks over Donald Hudson) (1988–1992)
- Marvel Fanfare #36 (1988)
- Marvel Premiere #41 (Seeker 3000); #43 (Paladin); #50 (Alice Cooper); #61 (Star-Lord) (1978–1981)
- Marvel Spotlight #9–11 (Ghost Rider) (1973)
- Marvel Spotlight vol. 2 #6–7 (Star-Lord) (1980)
- Master of Kung Fu #42 (inks over Paul Gulacy) (1976)
- Not Brand Echh #3–4, 6, 8–9, 11–12 (full art); #5–7 (inks over Jack Kirby); #8–9 (inks over Marie Severin); #11 (inks over Frank Springer); #13 (inks over Stuart Schwartzberg); #13 (inks over Bill Dubay) (1967–1969)
- Planet of the Apes #12, 15, 17, 20, 23–24, 29 (full art); #19 (inks over Mike Ploog) (1975–1977)
- Rawhide Kid #61 (1967)
- Supernatural Thrillers #15 (N'Kantu, the Living Mummy) (1975)
- Tales of the Zombie #10 (1975)
- Tower of Shadows #4, 6 (1970)
- Vampire Tales #4, 7 (1974)
- Warlock #1, 3–5 (inks over Gil Kane); #2 (inks over John Buscema); #6–8 (inks over Bob Brown) (1972–1973)
- Werewolf by Night #9–10 (full art); #11 (inks over Gil Kane) (1973)
- Western Gunfighters vol. 2 #1, 4–5 (full art); #1–2 (inks over Dick Ayers) (1970–1971)
- What If...? #18, 28 (full art); #2 (inks over Herb Trimpe) (1977–1981)
- Worlds Unknown #2 (inks over Gil Kane) (1973)
- X-Men #106 (inks over Dave Cockrum) (1977)

=== Skywald Publications ===
- Butch Cassidy #1 (1971)
- The Heap #1 (1971)
- Nightmare #3–5, 21 (1971–1974)
- The 1974 Nightmare Yearbook #1 (1974)
- Psycho #2–6, 22 (1971–1974)
- The 1974 Psycho Yearbook #1 (1974)

=== Warren Publishing ===
- Creepy #17, 22–24, 26–28, 30–33, 35–37, 40, 44–47, 53–54, 59, 61, 64, 144, Annual #1971, #1972 (1967–1983)
- Eerie #11–12, 17–29, 31–32, 34–36, 38–39, 41, 43–47, 53, 57, Annual #1972, Yearbook #1970 (1967–1974)
- Famous Monsters of Filmland #48 (1968)
- Vampirella #1–5, 7–12, 14, Annual #1 (1969–1972)
- Warren Presents #3 (1979)
- Warren Presents: Future World Comix (1978)

Preceded by n/a	Warlock inker 1972–1973	Succeeded by Steve Leialoha
Preceded by Jim Starlin	Doctor Strange vol. 2 penciller 1978–1979	Succeeded by Gene Colan
