= Jack C. Harris =

American comic book writer (born 1947)

- Born: August 30, 1947 (age 79)
- Areas: Writer, Editor
- Notable works: Wonder Woman

Jack C. Harris (born August 30, 1947) is an American comic book writer and editor known mainly for his work in the 1970s and 1980s at DC Comics.

== Biography ==
=== Early life and career ===
Jack C. Harris attended the Philadelphia College of Art and graduated with a BFA. He served in the Signal Corps while in the United States Army and was stationed in Germany. He was hired by DC Comics as part of the company's "Junior Woodchuck" program and became the assistant to editor Murray Boltinoff before becoming an editor himself. Harris wrote text articles and letters columns for various series and his first published comics story was "Political Rally Panic" in Isis #3 (February–March 1977).

Harris wrote several issues of Kamandi, an assignment he considered a personal favorite. As writer of the Wonder Woman comic book, he returned the series to a contemporary setting to reflect the timeframe change made from the World War II era to the present day in the television series. Harris was briefly writing every DC feature starring a female character. He and artist Trevor Von Eeden proposed an all-female superteam named the "Power Squad" to DC but the idea was not approved for publication.

In 1992, Harris and artist Joe Quesada co-created an updated version of the Golden Age character the Ray. At Marvel Comics, Harris co-created the character Annex in The Amazing Spider-Man Annual #27 and wrote a limited series featuring the new character the following year. In 1994, Harris wrote the graphic novel Batman: Castle of the Bat, painted by artist Bo Hampton. A Hulk and the Human Torch story written by Harris and drawn by Ditko in the 1980s was published by Marvel as Incredible Hulk and the Human Torch: From the Marvel Vault #1 in August 2011. Two Kamandi stories written by Harris and drawn by Dick Ayers and Danny Bulanadi in 1978, which went unreleased due to the title's cancellation, were published in 2017 as part of Kamandi Challenge Special #1.

=== Editor ===
Harris edited the first appearances of several new characters in their own eponymous series, including Black Lightning, Shade, the Changing Man, and Firestorm. As editor of the Legion of Super-Heroes title, Harris hired Steve Ditko to draw several issues, a decision which garnered a mixed reaction from the title's readership. Harris edited the Madame Xanadu one-shot in 1981, which was DC's first attempt at marketing comics specifically to the "direct market" of fans and collectors.

Among the new talent Harris helped to enter the comics industry was the writing team of Dan Mishkin and Gary Cohn and artists Trevor Von Eeden, John Workman, and Bob Smith. On the advice of artist Joe Staton, Harris gave British artist Brian Bolland his first assignment for a U.S. comics publisher, the cover for Green Lantern #127 (April 1980).

=== Educator ===
Harris was on the faculty of the School of Visual Arts in New York City in the BFA Cartooning Program.

=== Awards ===
In 2024, Harris would be a recipient of the Inkpot Award at the annual San Diego Comic Con.

== Bibliography ==
=== DC Comics ===
- Adventure Comics #459–462 (Wonder Woman) (1978–1979)
- The Amazing World of DC Comics #8, 11, 16 (1975–1977)
- Batman: Castle of the Bat #1 (1994)
- Cancelled Comic Cavalcade #2 (Kamandi) (1978)
- DC Comics Presents #3 (Superman and Adam Strange) (1978)
- DC Special Series #9 (Wonder Woman) (1978)
- DC Super Stars #14 (Two-Face), 17 (Legion of Super-Heroes) (1977)
- Detective Comics #484–495 (1979–1980)
- Dragonlance #28 (1991)
- Elvira's House of Mystery #1 (1986)
- Ghosts #77, 112 (1979–1982)
- Green Lantern #132 (Adam Strange), 168-169 (Tales of the Green Lantern Corps) (1980–1983)
- House of Mystery #251–256, 258, 276–281, 298, 308 (1977–1982)
- House of Secrets #152 (1978)
- Isis #3–8 (1977–1978)
- Kamandi, The Last Boy On Earth #52–59 (1977–1978)
- Kamandi Challenge Special #1 (2017)
- Karate Kid #11, 15 (1977–1978)
- Men of War #12–26 (Codename: Gravedigger) (1979–1980)
- Metal Men #51 (1977)
- Mystery in Space #111 (1980)
- The Ray #1–6 (1992)
- Secrets of Haunted House #22–41, 43, 45 (1980–1982)
- Sgt. Rock #364–365, 368, 370, 374, 378–379, 381, 383, 388, 392, 400 (1982–1985)
- Sgt. Rock Special #9 (1990)
- Showcase #101–103 (Hawkman and Adam Strange) (1978)
- Superboy and the Legion of Super-Heroes #240 (1978)
- The Superman Family #182–185, 187–190, 195–199, 201–209 (Supergirl) (1977–1981)
- Time Warp #1–2 (1979–1980)
- The Unexpected #190, 192, 199, 201–202, 204–205, 208, 212, 215–216 (1979–1981)
- The Warlord #48–49 (Claw the Unconquered) (1981)
- Weird War Tales #51–53, 67, 69, 74, 122 (1977–1983)
- Who's Who in the DC Universe Update 1993 #2 (1993)
- Wonder Woman #242–254 (1978–1979)
- World's Finest Comics #263 (Adam Strange), 271 (1980–1981)

=== HM Communications ===
- Heavy Metal #v6 #9, 11 (1982–1983)

=== Marvel Comics ===
- The Amazing Spider-Man Annual #27 (1993)
- Annex #1–4 (1994)
- Incredible Hulk and the Human Torch: From the Marvel Vault #1 (2011)
- Marvel Comics Presents #36 (Patsy Walker) (1989)
- Moon Knight #16 (1982)
- Spider-Man: Web of Doom #1–3 (1994)

=== Nintendo Picture Books ===
- The Legend of Zelda: Molblin's Magic Spear (1990) Molblin's Magic Spear is a children's picture book based on the Legend of Zelda series. It takes place during the storyline of the original game. It was written by Jack C. Harris and illustrated by Arthur Ellis and Kim Ellis. It was published by the Golden Books division of Western Publishing on February 1, 1990.

Preceded by Gerry Conway	Wonder Woman writer 1978–1979	Succeeded by Paul Levitz
Preceded by Dennis O'Neil	World's Finest Comics editor 1977–1981	Succeeded by Len Wein
Preceded by Julius Schwartz	Green Lantern editor 1978–1981	Succeeded by Len Wein
Preceded by Ross Andru	The Warlord editor 1979–1981	Succeeded by Ross Andru
Preceded by Murray Boltinoff	Ghosts editor 1979–1981	Succeeded by Dick Giordano
Preceded by Murray Boltinoff	The Unexpected editor 1979–1981	Succeeded by Dick Giordano
Preceded by n/a	Legion of Super-Heroes vol. 2 editor 1980–1981	Succeeded by Mike W. Barr
