= Gerry Talaoc =

Filipino comics artist

- Born: September 27, 1940 (age 86) The Philippines
- Areas: Penciller, Artist, Inker
- Notable works: House of Mystery; The Incredible Hulk; Star Spangled War Stories; The Unexpected; Weird War Tales

Gerry Talaoc is a Filipino comics artist best known for his 1970s work for DC Comics' war and horror anthology titles.

== Biography ==
Gerry Talaoc was among the vanguard of Filipino comics artists — including Alfredo Alcala, Nestor Redondo, Steve Gan, Ernie Chan and Alex Niño — recruited in 1971 for American comic books by DC editor Joe Orlando and publisher Carmine Infantino, following the success of the pioneering Tony DeZuniga. Initially working through countryman DeZuniga's studio, Talaoc's first published work in the United States was the story "Phony Face" in House of Mystery #205 (Aug. 1972). He drew multiple issues of Ghosts, House of Mystery, Star Spangled War Stories, The Unexpected, and Weird War Tales, among other titles. Talaoc's art was celebrated for its distinctive mix of the real and the cartoony, a style pioneered by such Golden Age cartoonists as Milton Caniff and Chester Gould.

In the mid–1970s, Talaoc also worked on comics adaptations of literary classics published by Pendulum Press.

In 1984, Talaoc moved to Marvel Comics, where he worked primarily as an inker. His first work there was on The Incredible Hulk #291 (Jan. 1984) paired with Sal Buscema. Other Marvel work included Alpha Flight and the Comet Man limited series inking over Kelley Jones' pencils. Talaoc retired from the American comics business in the early 1990s. During his career, Talaoc worked exclusively in the Philippines, although he now lives in the United States.

== Bibliography ==
=== DC Comics ===
- Elvira's House of Mystery #11 (1987)
- Forbidden Tales of Dark Mansion #15 (1974)
- Ghosts #10, 13–14, 16–18, 23, 27, 31, 87 (1972–1980)
- G.I. Combat #226, 233, 238, 245, 249, 251, 253, 264, 271, 275 (1981–1985)
- House of Mystery #205, 210–211, 215, 217–218, 224, 226, 228, 231, 282, 303, 315 (1972–1983)
- House of Secrets #105, 108, 110–111, 114, 121, 131, 150 (1973–1978)
- Limited Collectors' Edition #C–32 (1974)
- Phantom Stranger vol. 2 #27–31, 34–37 (1973–1975)
- Secrets of Haunted House #6 (1977)
- Secrets of Sinister House #10 (1973)
- Star Spangled War Stories #183–204 (Unknown Soldier) (1974–1977)
- Tarzan Family #66 (1976)
- The Unexpected #141, 150, 154, 156, 161, 165, 168, 176, 183, 188, 191, 198 (1972–1980)
- Unknown Soldier #205–210, 212–213, 215, 217–218, 220–222, 225–234, 236–268 (1977–1982)
- Weird War Tales #9, 11–12, 15, 18–19, 29–30, 32, 57, 68, 76, 81, 104, 106, 109 (1972–1982)
- The Witching Hour #25, 27–28, 63, 75, 79 (1972–1978)
- Young Romance #194 (1973)

=== Marvel Comics ===
- Alpha Flight #29–38, 66–67, 72, Annual #1 (1985–1989)
- Amazing High Adventure #1–2 (1984–1985)
- Animax #1–4 (1986–1987)
- Clive Barker's Hellraiser Summer Special #1 (1992)
- Comet Man #1–6 (1987)
- Conan the Barbarian #248 (1991)
- Daredevil #219 (1985)
- The Incredible Hulk vol. 2 #291, 293–294, 296–309, 311–313, Annual #13 (1984–1985)
- Kickers, Inc. #11 (1987)
- Marvel Comics Presents #47, 50–52 (1990)
- Power Pack #40 (1988)
- The Punisher vol. 2 #20 (1989)
- Rawhide Kid vol. 2 #2–3 (1985)
- Savage Sword of Conan #183 (1991)
- Strange Tales vol. 2 #7 (Cloak and Dagger) (1987)
- West Coast Avengers Annual #3 (1988)

Preceded by Jim Aparo	Phantom Stranger vol. 2 artist 1973–1975	Succeeded by Fred Carrillo
Preceded by Jack Sparling	Star Spangled War Stories artist 1974–1977	Succeeded by Dick Ayers
Preceded by Carlos Garzon	The Incredible Hulk vol. 2 inker 1983–1984	Succeeded by Bob Wiacek
Preceded by Keith Williams	Alpha Flight inker 1985–1986	Succeeded by Whilce Portacio
