= DC Special Series =

Umbrella title for DC Comics one-shots

- Cover to DC Special Series #1 (September 1977), art by Neal Adams.

Publication information
- Publisher: DC Comics
- Format: Ongoing
- Publication date: September 1977 – fall 1981
- No. of issues: 27

Creative team
- Written by: List: Cary Bates, Gerry Conway, Arnold Drake, Bob Haney, Robert Kanigher, George Kashdan, Paul Levitz, Dennis O'Neil, Martin Pasko, Roy Thomas, Len Wein, Carl Wessler
- Artist: List: Jim Aparo, Fred Carrillo, Ernie Chan, E. R. Cruz, Bill Draut, Sam Glanzman, Jorge Moliterni, Alex Niño, Marshall Rogers, Tom Sutton
- Penciller: List: Ross Andru, Dick Ayers, John Calnan, José Delbo, Dick Dillin, Steve Ditko, Ric Estrada, José Luis García-López, Michael Golden, Russ Heath, Arvell Jones, Frank Miller, Michael Netzer, Don Newton, Irv Novick, Art Saaf, Kurt Schaffenberger, Joe Staton, Curt Swan
- Inker: List: Vince Colletta, Joe Giella, Dick Giordano, Frank McLaughlin, Bob McLeod, Josef Rubinstein, Romeo Tanghal, Wally Wood
- Colorist: List: Liz Berube, Carl Gafford, Jerry Serpe
- Editor: List: Paul Levitz (#1, #8, #12, #18, #24); Joe Orlando (#2, #14, #17, #20, #25); Joe Kubert (#3, #13); Murray Boltinoff (#4, #7, #22); Julius Schwartz (#5, #11, #15); Jack C. Harris (#6, #23); Larry Hama (#9, #16); E. Nelson Bridwell (#10, #19); Len Wein (#21, #26); Dick Giordano (#27)

DC Special Series was an umbrella title for one-shots and special issues published by DC Comics between 1977 and 1981. Each issue featured a different character and was often in a different format than the issue before it. DC Special Series was published in four different formats: Dollar Comics, 48 page giants, digests, and treasury editions. Neither the umbrella title nor the numbering system appear on the cover; the title "DC Special Series" appeared only on the first page in the indicia. Most issues featured new material, but eight issues were reprints of previously published material.

== Publication history ==
DC Special Series was preceded by the theme-based reprint title DC Special, which ceased publication the month before DC Special Series debuted. The first issue included "The Dead on Arrival Conspiracy", a Batman vs. Kobra story by Martin Pasko, Michael Netzer (Nasser), and Joe Rubinstein originally scheduled for the unpublished Kobra #8. DC Special Series #1 also included the story, "How to Prevent a Flash", which introduces Patty Spivot. That character would later appear in season two of The Flash TV series, portrayed by actress Shantel VanSanten.

DC Special Series started out as a biweekly title in 1977 until Spring 1978, when it became quarterly. The series went on hiatus after the Fall 1978 issue and was revived in Summer 1979. Two stories originally scheduled to appear in DC Special Series were split apart and published in other titles due to the DC Implosion.

The final three issues were in the oversized treasury format. Issue #25 was a tie-in to the Superman II film and #26 featured "Secrets of Superman's Fortress" by Roy Thomas, Ross Andru, and Romeo Tanghal. The last issue was a DC-Marvel crossover between Batman and the Hulk.

== The issues ==
Issue	Contents	Date	Notes
1	5 Star Super-Hero Spectacular	September 1977	Dollar Comic format; features Aquaman, the Atom, Batman, Flash, and Green Lantern.
2	The Original Swamp Thing Saga	September 1977	48-page giant; reprints Swamp Thing #1–2 by Len Wein and Bernie Wrightson.
3	Sgt. Rock Special	October 1977	48-page giant
4	The Unexpected Special	October 1977	48-page giant
5	Superman Spectacular	November 1977	Dollar Comic format
6	Secret Society of Super-Villains Special	November 1977	48-page giant
7	Ghosts Special	December 1977	48-page giant
8	The Brave and the Bold Special	1978	48-page giant; Batman, Deadman, and Sgt. Rock team-up.
9	Wonder Woman Spectacular	1978	Dollar Comic format
10	Secret Origins of Super-Heroes Special	1978	48-page giant; origins of Doctor Fate, Lightray, and Black Canary.
11	The Flash Spectacular	1978	Dollar Comic format
12	Secrets of Haunted House Special	Spring 1978	48-page giant
13	Sgt. Rock Spectacular	Spring 1978	Dollar Comic format
14	The Original Swamp Thing Saga	Summer 1978	48-page giant; reprints Swamp Thing #3–4 by Len Wein and Bernie Wrightson.
15	Batman Spectacular	Summer 1978	Dollar Comic format; "Death Strikes at Midnight and Three", text story written by Dennis O'Neil with spot illustrations by Marshall Rogers. "I Now Pronounce You Batman and Wife!", marriage of Batman and Talia al Ghul, by O'Neil, Michael Golden, and Dick Giordano. See also Batman: Son of the Demon
16	Jonah Hex Spectacular	Fall 1978	Dollar Comic format; "The Last Bounty Hunter!", death of Jonah Hex, by Michael Fleisher and Russ Heath.
17	The Original Swamp Thing Saga	Summer 1979	Dollar Comic format; reprints Swamp Thing #5–7 by Len Wein and Bernie Wrightson.
18	Sgt. Rock's Prize Battle Tales	Fall 1979	Digest size; all reprints
19	Secret Origins of Super-Heroes	Fall 1979	Digest size; all reprints except for new origin of Wonder Woman by Cary Burkett, José Delbo, and Vince Colletta.
20	The Original Swamp Thing Saga	January–February 1980	Dollar Comic format; reprints Swamp Thing #8–10 by Len Wein and Bernie Wrightson.
21	Super-Star Holiday Special	Spring 1980	Dollar Comic format; features Legion of Super-Heroes, Jonah Hex, Sgt. Rock, the House of Mystery. "Wanted: Santa Claus -- Dead or Alive!" first Batman story drawn by Frank Miller.
22	G.I. Combat Special	September 1980	Dollar Comic format
23	World's Finest Comics Digest	February 1981	Digest size; all reprints
24	The Flash and His Friends	February 1981	Digest size; all reprints
25	Superman II	Summer 1981	Treasury format; photos and background material from the film.
26	Superman and His Incredible Fortress of Solitude	Summer 1981	Treasury format
27	Batman vs. the Incredible Hulk	Fall 1981	Treasury format; DC-Marvel crossover by Len Wein, José Luis García-López, and Dick Giordano.

== Collected editions ==
- The Greatest Flash Stories Ever Told includes "How to Prevent a Flash" from DC Special Series #1, 288 pages, February 1991, ISBN 978-0930289812
- Kobra: Resurrection includes "The Dead on Arrival Conspiracy" from DC Special Series #1, 144 pages, February 2010, ISBN 978-1401226558
- Secret Society of Super Villains Vol. 2 includes DC Special Series #6, 328 pages, May 2012, ISBN 978-1401231101
- Deadman Book Four includes DC Special Series #8, 168 pages, January 2014, ISBN 978-1401243241
- Deadman Omnibus includes DC Special Series #8, 944 pages, December 2020, ISBN 978-1779504883
- The Flash: The Greatest Stories Ever Told includes "Beyond the Super-Speed Barrier" from DC Special Series #11, 208 pages, August 2007, ISBN 978-1401213725
- The Greatest Batman Stories Ever Told includes "Death Strikes at Midnight and Three" from DC Special Series #15, 352 pages, 1988, ISBN 0930289-39-0
- Legends of the Dark Knight: Marshall Rogers includes "Death Strikes at Midnight and Three" from DC Special Series #15, 496 pages, November 2011, ISBN 978-1401232276
- Batman Arkham: Ra's Al Ghul includes "I Now Pronounce You Batman and Wife!" from DC Special Series #15, 232 pages, March 2019, ISBN 978-1401288815
- Legends of the Dark Knight: Michael Golden includes "I Now Pronounce You Batman and Wife!" from DC Special Series #15, 248 pages, June 2019, ISBN 978-1401289614
- The Complete Frank Miller Batman includes "Wanted: Santa Claus -- Dead or Alive!" from DC Special Series #21, 312 pages, December 1989, Longmeadow Press, ISBN 978-0681409699
- Superman: The Secrets of the Fortress of Solitude includes DC Special Series #26, 200 pages, May 2012, ISBN 978-1401234232
- The Marvel/DC Collection: Crossover Classics Volume 1 includes DC Special Series #27, 320 pages, June 1997, ISBN 978-0871358585

== See also ==
- DC Special
- Limited Collectors' Edition
- List of DC Comics publications (C–F)
