= Time Warp (comics) =

Comic

- Cover for Time Warp #1 (Oct.–Nov. 1979) by Michael Kaluta.

Publication information
- Publisher: DC Comics
- Schedule: Bimonthly
- Format: Ongoing series
- Genre: Science fiction
- Publication date: Series: October–November 1979 – June–July 1980; One-shot: May 2013
- No. of issues: Series: 5 One-shot: 1

Creative team
- Written by: List: Series: David Allikas, Mike W. Barr, Gary Cohn, J. M. DeMatteis, Arnold Drake, Scott Edelman, Michael Fleisher, Wyatt Gwyon, Bob Haney, Jack C. Harris, George Kashdan, Bill Kelley, Mimai Kin, Paul Kupperberg, Paul Levitz, Elliot S. Maggin, Sheldon Mayer, Dan Mishkin, Dennis O'Neil, Bob Rozakis One-shot: Dan Abnett, Ray Fawkes, Matt Kindt, Tom King, Toby Lift, Damon Lindelof, Peter Milligan, Gail Simone, Simon Spurrier
- Artist: List: Series: Jim Aparo, Edgar Bercasio, Fred Carrillo, Madz Castrillo, Vic Catan, Howard Chaykin, Steve Ditko, Dick Giordano, Jerry Grandenetti, Gil Kane, Joel Magpayo, Michael Netzer, Joe Orlando, Ernesto Patricio, Tom Sutton One-shot: Gael Bertrand, I. N. J. Culbard, Michael Dowling, Tom Fowler, Matt Kindt, Jeff Lemire, Andy MacDonald, M. K. Perker
- Penciller: List: Series: Dick Ayers, Eduardo Barreto, Jerry Bingham, Rich Buckler, Don Newton, Charles Nicholas, Romeo Tanghal, Trevor Von Eeden One-shot: Mark Buckingham
- Inker: List: Series: Dan Adkins, John Celardo, Armando Gil, Jimmy Janes, Steve Mitchell, Carl Potts, Dave Simons One-shot: Victor Santos
- Letterer: List: Series: Jim Aparo, Vic Catan, Albert DeGuzman, Todd Klein, Shelly Leferman, Esphidy Mahilum, Ben Oda, Milt Snapinn One-shot: Sal Cipriano, Taylor Esposito, Jared K. Fletcher, Travis Lanham, Todd Klein, Carlos M. Mangual, Dave Sharpe, Dezi Sienty
- Colorist: List: Series: Gene D'Angelo, Bob LeRose, Adrienne Roy, Jerry Serpe, Tatjana Wood One-shot: Jordie Bellaire, I. N. J. Culbard, Michael Dowling, Matt Kindt, Lee Loughridge, M. K. Perker, José Villarrubia

Time Warp is an American science fiction comic book anthology series published by DC Comics for five issues from 1979 to 1980. A Time Warp one-shot was published by Vertigo in May 2013.

== Publication history ==
In 1978, DC Comics intended to revive its science fiction anthology series Strange Adventures. These plans were put on hold that year due to the DC Implosion, a line-wide scaling back of the company's publishing output. When the project was revived a year later, the title was changed to Time Warp and the series was in the Dollar Comics format. The first issue was published with an October–November 1979 cover date. Michael Kaluta provided the cover art for the entire run.

The title featured a mixture of both established comics creators and new talent, such as Dennis O'Neil, Howard Chaykin, Mike Netzer, Arnold Drake, Don Newton, Steve Mitchell, Dick Giordano, Tom Sutton, J. M. DeMatteis, Scott Edelman, Vicatan, Paul Levitz and others. The writing team of Dan Mishkin and Gary Cohn made their comics debut in issue #3 with the three-page short story "On the Day of His Return" which was drawn by Steve Ditko.

Time Warp was canceled with issue #5 (June–July 1980) and unused inventory originally intended for the series was published in a revival of the Mystery in Space title. Other Time Warp stories appeared in the mystery anthology The Unexpected.

A one-shot was published by DC's Vertigo imprint in May 2013. It included a Rip Hunter story by writer Damon Lindelof and artist Jeff Lemire. Other contributors included Tom King, Gail Simone, Peter Milligan, Matt Kindt, Toby Litt and Mark Buckingham.

== Collected editions ==
- The Steve Ditko Omnibus Volume 1 includes stories from Time Warp #1–4, 480 pages, September 2011, ISBN 978-1401231118
- DC Through the 80s: The End of Eras includes Time Warp #2–3, 520 pages, December 2020, ISBN 978-1779500878
- Pulp Fiction Library: Mystery in Space includes "Brief Encounter" from Time Warp #5, 208 pages, September 1999, ISBN 1-56389-494-7
