= Solarman =

- The Benjamin Tucker incarnation of Solarman as depicted in Solarman #2 (March 1990). Art by Mike Zeck (penciler), Nestor Redondo (inker), Bob Sharen (colorist), and Janice Chiang (letterer).

Publication information
- Publisher: Pendulum Press (1979–1980); Marvel Comics (1989); Scout Comics (2016–2017)
- First appearance: Pendulum Press: Solarman #1: The Beginning (1979); Marvel Comics: Solarman #1 (January 1989); Scout Comics: Solarman #1 (July 2016)
- Created by: David Oliphant; Deborah Kalman

In-story information
- Alter ego: Davos; Benjamin Tucker
- Abilities: Superhuman strength; Flight; Energy manipulation; Space survivability

Solarman is a comic book superhero that first appeared in 1979, published by Pendulum Press, and then starred in a self-titled two-issue series from Marvel Comics in 1989. Solarman was revived as a title by Scout Comics in 2016. The character was originally created by David Oliphant and Deborah Kalman.

The character is unrelated to other characters named Solarman, such as the superhero from Saturn who appeared in Wham Comics #2 (Centaur Comics, Nov. 1940), the supervillain who appeared in two issues of Superman in 1976, or the hero turned villain who fought the Savage Dragon in 2006.

== Publication history ==
=== Pendulum Press ===
Solarman was created in the late 1970s by David Oliphant and Deborah Kalman. Oliphant was the founder and CEO of Pendulum Press, a children's educational publishing company responsible for the Illustrated Classics and Contemporary Motivators series, as well as licensed titles such as Star Wars. The character Solarman was created in response to the 1970s energy crisis as part of an energy awareness program to educate children about alternative fuels. Solarman was Davos, an alien from the Sun. Pendulum's Pendulum Illustrated Original series produced three issues of Solarman:

- Solarman #1: The Beginning (1979) — written by David Oliphant and M. Barbara O'Brien; "adapted" by Linda A. Cadrain and illustrated by E.R. Cruz
- Solarman #2: Day or Nite (1980) — written by David Oliphant and illustrated by Frank McLaughlin and Dick Giordano
- Solarman: At the Earth's Core (1980) — written by David Oliphant and illustrated by Rudy Nebres.

=== Marvel Comics ===
Years later, Marvel Comics writer/editor Stan Lee and then-Marvel president Jim Galton contacted Oliphant with the suggestion of publishing a Solarman book through Marvel. Oliphant, Lee, and Margaret Loesch created a new version of Solarman: his secret identity is a teenager named Ben Tucker who aspires to be a comic book artist, and whose adversary is the alien warlord Gormagga Kraal. Written by Lee and illustrated by Jim Mooney, this version of Solarman debuted in 1989, and lasted two issues. In 1992, a 22-minute animated Solarman pilot was also produced, based on the Marvel Comics version.

=== Scout Comics ===
Decades later, Oliphant and Kalman revamped the character as a black superhero, and chose Scout Comics as the publisher. Scout Comics owner Brendan Deneen reached out to writer/editor Joe Illidge to co-write and edit a new Solarman series. Illidge hired N. Steven Harris, whom he had known since their days at Manhattan's School of Visual Arts, to be the artist on the series, Andrew Dalhouse as the color artist, and Marshall Dillon as the letterer.

Although likeable, Illidge characterizes this version of Tucker as "arrogant and angry," one who engages in hacking because he has a chip on his shoulder, and becomes a fugitive from the government and aliens who have vested interest in his powers. Harris, who designed the character, had never heard of him until around the time of his hiring, and based his design on real people that he and Illidge felt fit the look of a frustrated computer hacker.

== Fictional character biography ==
=== Pendulum Press ===
Davos is a handsome young Solarite from the highly advanced civilization of Coresun which is located deep in the center of the Sun. He is sent to Earth to educate its people about safer alternatives to fossil fuels and atomic power, taking with him his android servant Arman who is programmed in the ways of Earth and his Solarcell Medallion which acts as a rechargeable battery for when he is away from the sunlight he needs to survive.

He can shoot flames out of his eyes and fly in the form of a blazing fireball. His strength, born of the Sun's greater gravity, gets him a job as a professional baseball player for the Los Angeles Stars, which he uses as a celebrity platform to spread his message of the advantages of solar power.

Nicknamed "Solarman", Davos also uses his alien powers to save lives and fight crime and gains a girlfriend in CIA department head Laura Bourne (no relation).

=== Marvel Comics ===
Solarman is teenager Benjamin Tucker, who dreams of becoming an artist for Marvel Comics even though his Los Angeles gym-owner father wants him to become a jock. Meanwhile, the alien cyborg warlord Gormagga Kraal wants to drain all the energy from Earth's sun, but his head scientist, Sha-han, refuses and flees to Earth with Kraal's Circlet of Power, which he gives to Ben along with a robot assistant dubbed Beepie.

Thereafter, Ben can expose the Circlet to sunlight and transform into the golden-haired adult Solarman who possesses superhuman strength, is capable of supersonic flight and survival in deep space and can control light, heat, and other forms of energy. However, he requires constant exposure to sunlight to maintain his powers.

=== Scout Comics ===
Ben Tucker is a bullied, biracial teenager living in Brooklyn's East New York neighborhood, with his police officer father, as his mother is deceased.

Ben uses his hacking skills to expose the illegal dealings of white collar criminals and corrupt politicians, but when he is accidentally exposed to extraterrestrial technology and infected by an alien virus that gives him energy-based super powers, he finds himself on the run from hostile forces both human and otherwise.

== In other media ==
Solarman appears in a self-titled television pilot, which was originally released on VHS before airing on television on October 24, 1992. According to Oliphant, a major studio offered $15 million to create a full Solarman series, but Marvel rejected the offer out of a belief that Saturday morning superhero cartoons would soon decline in popularity.
