= Pendulum Press =

American publishing company (1970–1994)

- Parent company: Academic Industries, Inc.
- Founded: 1970
- Founder: David Oliphant
- Defunct: 1994
- Country of origin: United States
- Headquarters location: West Haven, Connecticut
- Key people: Vincent Fago, Nestor Redondo, Alex Niño, Gerry Talaoc, Naunerle Farr, John Norwood Fago, Kin Platt
- Publication types: Comics, books
- Fiction genres: Adaptations of literary classics
- Imprints: Pendulum Now Age Classics Series; Pendulum Illustrated Original

Pendulum Press was a publishing company based in West Haven, Connecticut, that operated from 1970 to 1994, producing the bulk of their material in the 1970s. The company is most well known for their comic book adaptations of literary classics. The Pendulum Now Age Classics series published black-and-white paperback adaptations of more than 70 literary classics, such as Twenty Thousand Leagues Under the Seas, The War of the Worlds, and Moby-Dick. These stories were later widely reprinted by other publishers (including by Marvel Comics) well into the 2000s. Pendulum also published a line of historical comics, a line of comic book biographies, and a line of comic book adaptations of inspiring stories and morality tales.

Founded by David Oliphant as a division of Academic Industries, Inc., Pendulum's comics division was overseen by veteran creator/editor Vincent Fago. The company received Title One funds from the U.S. government to produce comics with an educational focus.

== History ==
=== Pendulum Illustrated Classics ===
Logo for Pendulum's Now Age Books line

In 1970, Vincent Fago, the former editor-in-chief of Timely Comics, was hired by Pendulum to produce the Pendulum Now Age Classics series, which were black-and-white paperback adaptations of literary classics. Specifically designed for classroom use, the series used set type instead of hand lettering, vocabulary appropriate for grade levels, and included word lists and questions at the back.

Acting as a publisher from his studio in Bethel, Vermont, Fago edited and handled production on the nearly one hundred titles in the series. Adaptations were handled by writers like Otto Binder, Naunerle Farr, Kin Platt, Irwin Shapiro, and Fago's son John Norwood Fago.

After having difficulty finding American artists to illustrate the comics, Fago turned to Filipino artist Nestor Redondo, who offered to help recruit some of his fellow Filipino comics artists — these artists ended up illustrating almost every comic Pendulum produced. In addition to the work of Redondo, who illustrated more than 20 books in the series, the Pendulum Illustrated Classics featured the artwork of Alex Niño, Gerry Talaoc, Vicatan, Rudy Nebres, Jun Lofamia, Nestor Leonidez, and E. R. Cruz. (Redondo's brothers Virgilio and Frank also illustrated books in the series.)

Comics in the series were published from 1973 to 1980; the series ended with a selection of Shakespeare plays adapted into comics form.

==== Ancillaries and reprints ====
From 1976 to 1981, Fago produced a multimedia read-along program for the series, called New Matter Sounds. Each packet contained a reading booklet, a student activity booklet, a sound cassette, and an answer key sheet. Some of the packets contained a narrated film strip along with the other materials.

Many of the early issues in the Pendulum Illustrated Classics series were reprinted, in color with new covers, in 1976 by Marvel Comics as Marvel Classics Comics.

In 1984, Pendulum's parent company Academic Industries reprinted a number of the Illustrated Classics (as well as other Pendulum comics) in a smaller format.

In 1984–1988, Pendulum and the Indian publisher Pai and Company (Paico) co-published series as Paico Classics in various Indian languages (as well as the original English). Paico republished the series in 1998–2000.

In 1990–1991, Pendulum itself reprinted a selection of Pendulum Illustrated Classics, retitled Pendulum's Illustrated Stories, in colorized versions with new painted covers. Originally planned to run 72 issues, the company only produced six issues before abandoning the project.

In 1994, Pendulum reprinted its 1974 adaptation of The Hunchback of Notre-Dame, colorized in a prestige format comic under the banner of the Phonics Classic Achievement Series. It announced more titles but these were also abandoned when the company closed down.

Also in 1994, Lake Illustrated Classics (a division of AGS Secondary) reprinted many of the Pendulum Illustrated Classics under their own banner.

Since 2006, Saddleback Educational Publishing has reprinted many of the Pendulum Illustrated Classics under their own banner, using the 1990-91 cover format.

=== Other publications ===
In 1976, to tie in with America's bicentennial, Pendulum published a line of historical comics called the Basic Illustrated History of America. This line was edited by Vince Fago's wife, D'ann Calhoun, and written by Naunerle Farr.

In 1978 Pendulum also published a primer on the value of comics as an education tool.

In 1978–79, Pendulum published a line of comic book biographies under the series title Pendulum Illustrated Biography Series. The books were flip books — half the book would feature one notable person, and then the reader would flip the book over to read the biography of the other featured notable.

In 1978–79, Pendulum published the series Contemporary Motivators, a line of comic book adaptations of inspiring stories and morality tales like Banner in the Sky, God Is My Co-Pilot, Guadalcanal Diary, The Diary of Anne Frank, and Lost Horizon; as well as a rough adaptation of Star Wars. Like the Illustrated Classics series, these comics were specifically designed for classroom use, with typeset instead of hand lettering, vocabulary appropriate for grade levels, and word lists and questions at the back.

In 1979, the company introduced the Pendulum Illustrated Original series, mostly featuring the new superhero Solarman, created by Pendulum founder and president David Oliphant. Solarman was later revived by Marvel Comics in a 1989 series.

Pendulum also published a small line of prose books, by authors such as David M. Kennedy, Bertram Wyatt-Brown, and Joseph Payne Brennan, including biographical, sociology, and poetry titles.

== Titles ==
=== Comics ===
==== Pendulum Illustrated Classics ====
Title	Pub. date	Adaptation	Artist(s)	Notes
20,000 Leagues Under the Sea	1973	Otto Binder	Romy Gaboa & Ernie Patricio	hardcover book collecting a version which had been previously serialized in Weekly Reader magazine. Later reprinted in Marvel Classics Comics #4 (1976), in 1991 by Pendulum, with a new painted cover, and in 2010 by Saddleback Publishing as part of their Illustrated Classics series.
Black Beauty	1973	Naunerle Farr	Rudy Nebres	Reprinted in Marvel Classics Comics #5 (1976)
The Call of the Wild	1973	Kin Platt	Fred Carrillo	Reprinted as #6 in 2006 by Saddleback Publishing as part of their Illustrated Classics series.
Dr. Jekyll and Mr. Hyde	1973	Kin Platt	Nestor Redondo	Reprinted in Marvel Classics Comics #1 (1976); colorized and reprinted by Pendulum in 1990 with a new painted cover
Dracula	1973	Naunerle Farr	Nestor Redondo	Reprinted in Marvel Classics Comics #9 (1976)
Frankenstein	1973	Otto Binder	Nardo Cruz	Reprinted as #15 in 2006 by Saddleback Publishing as part of their Illustrated Classics series.
Huckleberry Finn	1973	Naunerle Farr	Frank Redondo	Reprinted as #8 in 2006 by Saddleback Publishing as part of their Illustrated Classics series.
Moby-Dick	1973	Irwin Shapiro	Alex Niño & Dan Adkins	Reprinted in Marvel Classics Comics #8 (1976); colorized and reprinted by Pendulum in 1990 with a new painted cover
The Time Machine	1973	Otto Binder	Alex Niño	Reprinted in Marvel Classics Comics #2 (1976)
Tom Sawyer	1973	Irwin Shapiro	E. R. Cruz	Reprinted in Marvel Classics Comics #7 (1976)
Treasure Island	1973	John Norwood Fago	Nardo Cruz	Colorized and reprinted by Pendulum in 1990 with a new painted cover and Reprinted as #40 in 2006 by Saddleback Publishing as part of their Illustrated Classics series.
Sir Arthur Conan Doyle: The Great Adventures of Sherlock Holmes	1974	Kin Platt (as Nick Tall)	Nestor Redondo	Reprinted as #25 in 2006 by Saddleback Publishing as part of their Illustrated Classics series.
Gulliver's Travels	1974	John Norwood Fago	E. R. Cruz	Reprinted in Marvel Classics Comics #6 (1976)
The Hunchback of Notre-Dame	1974	Naunerle Farr	Jun Lofamia	Reprinted in Marvel Classics Comics #3 (1976); colorized and reprinted by Pendulum in 1994 (the first [and only] issue of the Phonics Classic Achievement Series)
The Invisible Man	1974	Otto Binder	Alex Niño	Reprinted as #2 in 2006 by Saddleback Publishing as part of their Illustrated Classics series.
Robert Louis Stevenson: Kidnapped	1974	Kin Platt] (as Nick Tall)	Frank Redondo	Reprinted as #33 in 2006 by Saddleback Publishing as part of their Illustrated Classics series.
The Mysterious Island	1974	Otto Binder	E. R. Cruz	Reprinted in Marvel Classics Comics #11 (1976)
The Red Badge of Courage	1974	Irwin Shapiro	E. R. Cruz	Reprinted in Marvel Classics Comics #10 (1976)
Nathaniel Hawthorne's The Scarlet Letter	1974	Naunerle Farr	Virgilio Redondo	Reprinted as #22 in 2006 by Saddleback Publishing as part of their Illustrated Classics series.
The Story of My Life, by Helen Keller	1974	C. N. Douglas	Tony DeZuniga	
A Tale of Two Cities	1974	Naunerle Farr	Alfredo Alcala	Reprinted as #5 in 2006 by Saddleback Publishing as part of their Illustrated Classics series.
The Three Musketeers	1974	Naunerle Farr	Alex Niño	Reprinted in Marvel Classics Comics #12 (1976)
The War of the Worlds	1974	Naunerle Farr	Alex Niño	Reprinted as #28 in 2006 by Saddleback Publishing as part of their Illustrated Classics series.
A Connecticut Yankee in King Arthur's Court	1976	John Norwood Fago	Frank Redondo	Reprinted as #31 in 2006 by Saddleback Publishing as part of their Illustrated Classics series.
Journey to the Center of the Earth	1976	Naunerle Farr	Val Calaquian	
White Fang	1976	Naunerle Farr	Fred Carrillo	
Around the World in Eighty Days	1977	D'ann Calhoun	Frank Redondo	part of New Matter Sounds multimedia packet, including a student activity book by Gerald Dackerman and Marcia Sohl and filmstrip narration by Jan Leighton
The Best of Poe	1977	Naunerle Farr	Gerry Talaoc, Nestor Redondo, Noly Zamora, and E. R. Cruz	Reprinted as #41 in 2006 by Saddleback Publishing as part of their Illustrated Classics series.
The Best of O. Henry	1977	John Norwood Fago	Antonio Caravana a.k.a. Tony Caravana	part of New Matter Sounds multimedia packet with filmstrip narration by Chris Davala
Captains Courageous	1977	John Norwood Fago	Leonardo Patricia	part of New Matter Sounds multimedia packet
The Hound of the Baskervilles	1977	John Norwood Fago	E. R. Cruz	
The House of the Seven Gables	1977	Naunerle Farr	Domy Guitierez & Angel Trinidad	
Jane Eyre	1977	Naunerle Farr	N. Olimar	
The Last of the Mohicans	1977	Naunerle Farr	Fred Carrillo	
Two Years Before the Mast	1977	John Norwood Fago	E. R. Cruz	
Wuthering Heights	1977	Naunerle Farr	Jo Amongo	
Ben-Hur: A Tale of the Christ	1978	Naunerle Farr	Nestor Redondo	
A Christmas Carol	1978	Tom Fagen	Jun Lofamia	Colorized and reprinted by Pendulum in 1991 with a new painted cover
The Food of the Gods	1978	John Norwood Fago	Tony Caravana a.k.a. Antonio Caravana	part of New Matter Sounds multimedia packet
Ivanhoe	1978	Naunerle Farr	Gerry Talaoc	
The Man in the Iron Mask	1978	Naunerle Farr	Frank Redondo	part of New Matter Sounds multimedia packet
The Prince and the Pauper	1978	John Norwood Fago	E. R. Cruz	
The Prisoner of Zenda	1978	John Norwood Fago	Nestor Leonidez	
The Return of the Native	1978	D'ann Calhoun	Fred Carrillo	
Robinson Crusoe	1978	John Norwood Fago	E. R. Cruz	
The Sea-Wolf	1979	John Norwood Fago	Domy Guitierez & Angel Trinidad	
The Scarlet Pimpernel	1978	Naunerle Farr	Rudy Florese	
The Swiss Family Robinson	1978	Naunerle Farr	Fred Carrillo	part of New Matter Sounds multimedia packet
Billy Budd	1979	Stella Alico	Vicatan	
Crime and Punishment	1979	John Norwood Fago	Vicatan	part of New Matter Sounds multimedia packet
Don Quixote	1979	John Norwood Fago	Fred Carrillo	64-page hardcover edition
Great Expectations	1979	Stella Alico	Angel Trinidad	part of New Matter Sounds multimedia packet
Heidi	1979	Sally Grindley	Pamela Venus	
The Iliad	1979	John Norwood Fago	E. R. Cruz	
Lord Jim	1979	John Norwood Fago	Frank Redondo	
The Mutiny on Board H. M. S. Bounty	1979	John Norwood Fago	Rudy Florese	part of New Matter Sounds multimedia packet
The Odyssey	1979	John Norwood Fago	Nestor Redondo	
Oliver Twist	1979	Stella Alico	Fred Carrillo	
Pride and Prejudice	1979	Naunerle Farr	Nestor Leonidez	
The Turn of the Screw	1979	Susan Conforti	Gerry Talaoc	part of New Matter Sounds multimedia packet
Romeo and Juliet	1979	Rich Margopoulous	Nestor Redondo	
As You Like It	1980	Naunerle Farr	Nestor Leonidez	
Julius Caesar	1980	Naunerle Farr	Vicatan	
King Lear	1980	Naunerle Farr	Gerry Talaoc	part of New Matter Sounds multimedia packet
Macbeth	1980	Rich Margopoulos	Vicatan	
A Midsummer Night's Dream	1980	John Norwood Fago	Fred Carrillo	Colorized and reprinted by Pendulum in 1991 with a new painted cover
Othello	1980	D'ann Calhoun	Vicatan	
The Tempest	1980	Rich Margopoulos	Gerry Talaoc	
Twelfth Night	1980	Naunerle Farr	E. R. Cruz	
The Merchant of Venice	1980	Naunerle Farr	Jun Lofamia	part of New Matter Sounds multimedia packet
The Taming of the Shrew	1980	Naunerle Farr	Fred Carrillo	
Hamlet	1980	Naunerle Farr	E. R. Cruz	

==== Pendulum's Illustrated Stories ====
Colorized reprints of the Pendulum Illustrated Classics

1. Moby-Dick (1990)
2. Treasure Island (1990)
3. Dr. Jekyll and Mr. Hyde (1990)
4. 20,000 Leagues Under the Sea (Mar. 1991)
5. A Christmas Carol (1991)
6. A Midsummer Night's Dream (1991)

==== Basic Illustrated History of America ====
edited by D'Ann Calhoun with Lawrence Bloch

- The New World, 1500-1750 (1976) — written by Naunerle Farr and illustrated by E. R. Cruz; part of New Matter Sounds multimedia packet
- The Fight for Freedom, 1750–1783 (1976) — written by Naunerle Farr and illustrated by Virgilio Redondo
- The United States Emerges, 1783–1800 (1976) — written by Naunerle Farr and illustrated by Fred Carrillo
- Problems of the New Nation, 1800-1830 (1976) — written by Naunerle Farr & Dennis Dostert, and illustrated by Jun Lofamia
- Americans Move Westward, 1800-1850 (1977) — written by Naunerle Farr and illustrated by Frank Redondo; 16 pp.
- Before the Civil War, 1830-1860 (1976) — written by Naunerle Farr & Dennis Dostert] and illustrated by E. R. Cruz
- The Civil War, 1850-1876 (1976) — written by Naunerle Farr and illustrated by Nestor Redondo; part of New Matter Sounds multimedia packet
- The Industrial Era, 1865-1915 (1976) — written by Naunerle Farr & Dennis Dostert, and illustrated by Fred Carrillo
- America Becomes a World Power, 1890-1920 (1977) — written by Naunerle Farr and illustrated by Resty Ronguillo
- The Roaring Twenties and the Great Depression, 1920–1940 (1976) — written by Naunerle Farr and illustrated by Tony Caravana
- World War II, 1940-1945 (1976) — written by Naunerle Farr and illustrated by N. E. Phillips
- America Today, 1945-1976 (1976) — written by Naunerle Farr and illustrated by Nardo Cruz

==== Pendulum Illustrated Biography series ====
- Houdini/Walt Disney (1978) — written by John Norwood Fago and illustrated by Eufronio Reyes
- Abraham Lincoln/Franklin D. Roosevelt (1979) — written by Naunerle Farr and illustrated by Nestor Redondo (Lincoln) and Jun Lofamia (Roosevelt)
- Babe Ruth/Jackie Robinson (1979) — written by Naunerle Farr and illustrated by Tony Caravana (Ruth) and Nardo Cruz (Robinson)
- Charles Lindbergh/Amelia Earhart (1979) — written by John Norwood Fago and Naunerle Farr, and illustrated by Vicatan
- Elvis Presley/The Beatles (1979) — adapted by Stella Alico and illustrated by E. R. Cruz (Elvis) and Ernie Guanlao (Beatles); the Beatles portion was included as part of Pendulum's High Motivation Reading Series sponsored by Radio Shack
- Jim Thorpe/Althea Gibson (1979) — written by John Norwood Fago and illustrated by Frank Redondo
- Madame Curie/Albert Einstein (1979) — written by Naunerle Farr and illustrated by Nestor Redondo
- Thomas Edison/Alexander Graham Bell (1979) — written by Naunerle Farr and illustrated by Gerry Talaoc (Edison) and Angel Trinidad (Bell)
- Vince Lombardi/Pelé (1979) — written by John Norwood Fago and illustrated by Tony Caravana (Lombardi) and Nardo Cruz (Pelé)

==== Contemporary Motivators series ====
- Star Wars adapted by Linda A. Cadrain and Charles Nicholas (1978)
1. The Caine Mutiny
2. Banner in the Sky
3. God Is My Co-Pilot adapted by Linda A. Cadrain and Charles Nicholas
4. Guadalcanal Diary (June 1978)
5. Hiroshima
6. Hot Rod (1978)
7. Just Dial a Number by Edith Maxwell, adapted by Charles Nicholas
8. The Diary of Anne Frank (1979)
9. Lost Horizon adapted by Catherine Wichterman and Charles Nicholas (1978)

==== Solarman (1979–1980) ====
- Solarman #1: The Beginning (1979) — written by David Oliphant and M. Barbara O'Brien; adapted by Linda A. Cadrain and uncredited artist
- Solarman #2: Day or Nite (1980) — written by David Oliphant and illustrated by Dick Giordano
- Solarman: At the Earth's Core (1980)

=== Books ===
- The American People in the Age of Kennedy, by David M. Kennedy (1973)
- The American People in the Antebellum South, edited by Bertram Wyatt-Brown (1973)
- A Sheaf of Snow Poems, by Joseph Payne Brennan (1973)
- The Illustrated Format: an Effective Teaching Tool (1978) ISBN 0883013487

== See also ==
Other companies/imprints known for comics adaptations of literature:

- Classical Comics
- Gilberton
- Marvel Illustrated
- Paico Classics
- Self Made Hero
