= Vincent Fago =

American comic artist

- Born: Vincenzo Francisco Gennaro Di Fago; November 28, 1914 Yonkers, New York, U.S.
- Died: June 13, 2002 (aged 87) Bethel, Vermont, U.S.
- Areas: Writer, Artist, Editor
- Notable works: Timely Comics
- Spouse: D'Ann Calhoun (m. 1941)
- Children: 3

Vincenzo Francisco Gennaro Di Fago (/ˈfeɪɡoʊ/; November 28, 1914 – June 13, 2002), known professionally as Vince Fago, was an American comic-book artist and writer who served as interim editor of Timely Comics, the Golden Age predecessor of Marvel Comics, during editor Stan Lee's World War II service.

Fago headed the Timely animator bullpen, which was largely separate from the superhero group that produced comics featuring the Human Torch, the Sub-Mariner and Captain America. This group, which featured such movie tie-in and original talking animal comics as Terrytoons Comics, Mighty Mouse and Animated Funny Comic-Tunes, included Ernie Hart, David Gantz, Chad Grothkopf, George Klein, Pauline Loth, Jim Mooney, Kin Platt, Mike Sekowsky, Moss Worthman (a.k.a. Moe Worth) and future Mad cartoonists Dave Berg and Al Jaffee.

Later in his career, Fago oversaw Pendulum Press' Now Age Books line of comic book adaptations of literary classics.

== Biography ==
=== Early career ===
Ziggy Pig and Silly Seal in Animated Funny Comic-Tunes (formerly Funny Tunes), one of Fago's Timely Comics titles

Fago was born in 1914 in Yonkers, New York, of parents who had immigrated from Naples, Italy. He had two sisters and a 10-year-older brother, Al Fago. At 14, Vincent Fago sold his first cartoon to the New York Sun, for $2. He attended DeWitt Clinton High School in the Bronx, graduating at age 20, he recalled in 2001, after encountering difficulties upon losing vision in one eye at age 16. By this time he had begun work as an animation tracer at Audio Productions in the old Edison studios in The Bronx, and advanced to become an in-betweener after the company moved to the Fox Movietone News Building. He then worked four years at the Jam Handy Studio in Detroit, Michigan, contributing, he said, to "films for Chevrolet, and stop-motion pictures, and Technicolor films for the Metropolitan Life Insurance Company. From there, he spent four years in Florida as an animator at Fleischer Brothers Studios, where he worked as an assistant animator on Betty Boop, Popeye and Supermantheatrical shorts and on the animated features Mr. Bug Goes to Town and Gulliver's Travels.

After the Japanese bombing of Pearl Harbor in December 1941, Fago, not wishing to work on the war-related projects the studio began doing, returned to New York City. Moving in with his mother in The Bronx, he found work as a freelance artist at Timely Comics, the 1940s antecedent of Marvel Comics, doing such humor and talking-animal features as "Dinky" and "Frenchy Rabbit" in Terrytoons Comics; "Floop and Skilly Boo" in Comedy Comics; "Posty the Pelican Postman" in Krazy Komics and other titles; "Krazy Krow" in that character's eponymous comic; and, following other writers/artists, the features "Tubby an' Tack" and "Ziggy Pig and Silly Seal". He quickly became head of the "animator" bullpen producing those non-superhero comics, and during editor Stan Lee's U.S. Army service from 1942 to 1945, Fago assumed the interim title of Timely's Editorial and Art Director, beginning on comics cover-dated March 1943. Sometime after Lee's return, Fago left to work in independent comic-book production; he and his brother Al self-published the one-shot Kiddie Kapers (under the company name Kiddie Kapers Company). He also worked as a children's-book illustrator for Golden Press.

In 1948, he took over the syndicated Sunday comic strip Peter Rabbit (based not on the Beatrix Potter books but on a character from the Thornton Burgess series that began with The Adventures of Peter Cottontail), continuing with that strip until it was cancelled in 1957.

=== Later career ===
For the entire decade of the 1970s, Fago worked under a ten-year contract for West Haven, Connecticut-based Pendulum Press. Based in his Bethel studio, Fago adapted, edited, and handled production for Pendulum's extensive line of Now Age Books comic book adaptation of literary classics. Specifically designed for classroom use, the Pendulum classics used typeset instead of hand lettering, vocabulary appropriate for grade levels, and included word lists and questions at the back. After having difficulty finding American artists to illustrate the comics, Fago turned to Filipino artist Nestor Redondo, who offered to help Fago recruit some of his fellow Filipino comics artists. In 1970, Fago and his wife traveled to the Philippines and, with Redondo as their guide, found many artists who would illustrate most of the hundred or more titles Pendulum eventually produced.

During this period, Fago also collaborated with Vermont-based musician Julie Albright on The Rabbit Man Music Books, a series designed to teach children music theory.

Other books include Zhin or Zhen (Charles Tuttle Publishing, 1972).

=== Personal life and family ===
For most of his adult life Fago and his wife, D'Ann Calhoun, whom he married in 1941, lived in a rural section of Rockland County, New York. They moved to Bethel, Vermont, in 1968, following D'ann's appointment as director of Vermont's Arts and Crafts Service (a division of the Vermont Department of Education). They had two children, son John and daughter, Celie. Fago spent his final years in Bethel with his wife before dying of cancer at age 87.

Fago's brother Al Fago was also a cartoonist who created the Charlton Comics character Atomic Mouse.

Preceded by Stan Lee	Marvel Comics Editor-in-Chief; 1942–1945	Succeeded by Stan Lee
