= Comics in education =

The use of comics in education is based on the concept of creating engagement and motivation for students.

== Overview ==
The effectiveness of comics as medium for effective learning and development has been the subject of debate since the origin modern comic book in the 1930s. Sones (1944) notes that comics "evoked more than a hundred critical articles in educational and non-professional periodicals."

The use of comics in education would later attract the attention of Fredric Wertham who noted that the use of comics in education represented "an all-time low in American science."

It has been noted that the use of a narrative form such as a comic "can foster pupils' interest in science" and help students remember what they have learnt and providing a means of fostering discussion. However, it has also been noted that many educators remain "ambivalent" about the use of comic books as an educational tool. Comics have also been used as a medium to communicate health care information on subjects such as diabetes.

In 1978, Pendulum Press published a primer on the value of comics as an educational tool: The Illustrated Format: an Effective Teaching Tool (ISBN 0883013487). In the US, the use of comics for education, using the Internet, can be seen on Comics in the Classroom, and the state of Maryland's Comic Book Initiative. Teacher professional development content on how teachers can integrate comics into the classroom is available through the State of California Department of Education's Brokers of Expertis website.

== See also ==
- Comics studies
- Graphic medicine
