= 1984 (magazine) =

American science-fiction comic magazine

- 1984 #2 (1978). Cover art by Richard Corben

Publication information
- Publisher: Warren Publishing
- Format: anthology/continuing series
- Publication date: June 1978 to February 1983
- No. of issues: 29
- Editor: William DuBay

1984 was an American black and white science-fiction comic magazine published in New York City by Warren Publishing from 1978 to 1983. 1984 was edited by Bill Dubay. The title of the magazine was changed to 1994 starting with issue #11 in February, 1980 based on a request by the estate of George Orwell. The magazine ceased publication with issue #29 in February, 1983 due to the bankruptcy of Warren Publishing.

== Contributors ==
Artists who contributed stories to 1984/1994 included Alex Niño, Richard Corben, Jose Gonzalez, Jose Ortiz, Frank Thorne, Esteban Maroto, Rudy Nebres, Jimmy Janes, Abel Laxamana, Wally Wood, Luis Bermejo, Alfredo Alcala, and Vic Catan. Cover artists included Nino, Corben, Patrick Woodroffe, Jim Laurier, Sanjulián, Jordi Penalva, H.R. Giger, Steve Fastner, Rich Larsen, Lloyd Garrison, Terry Oates and John Berkey. Writers included Dubay, Thorne, Jim Stenstrum, Jan Strnad, Rich Margopoulos, Kevin Duane, Nicola Cuti and Gerry Boudreau.

== Recurring characters and series ==
Similar to its sister publications Eerie and Vampirella, 1984 featured numerous recurring series and characters. This included the following:

- Mutant World (Artist: Richard Corben; Writer; Jan Strnad)
- Ghita of Alizarr (Drawn and written by Frank Thorne)
- Idi Amin (Artist: Esteban Maroto; Writer: Bill Dubay)
- Rex Havoc (Artist: Abel Laxamana; Writer: Jim Stenstrum)
- The Starfire Saga (Artist: Rudy Nebres; Writer: Bill Dubay)
- Young Sigmond Pavlov (Artist: Alex Niño; Writer: Bill Dubay)

== Controversies ==
One of the most notable incidents that occurred regarding the magazine was an unauthorized adaptation of Harlan Ellison's short story, "A Boy and His Dog", which has been rumored as one of the major factors in the bankruptcy of Warren Publishing. As discussed in the book The Warren Companion, editor Bill Dubay approached writers Gerry Boudreau and Jim Stenstrum about adapting science fiction stories for the magazine. Boudreau asked permission to adapt Ellison's story, and Dubay approved this, without first asking Ellison. When Ellison refused to grant permission, Dubay had artist Alex Niño draw the story anyway, then provided the art to Stenstrum to use as the basis for a new story. The story was published in issue #4, under the title "Mondo Megillah". Despite Stenstrum's reworking of the script, the basic story was still obvious plagiarism and Ellison filed a lawsuit, which he eventually won.

Advertised as an adult fantasy magazine, 1984 contained very mature subject matter by the standards of the time. To compete with rivals such as Heavy Metal it contained many stories featuring sex and other controversial subjects. As discussed by comics historian Richard Arndt, editor DuBay edited stories within the magazine to focus more on this subject matter, such as this incident that occurred with artist Wally Wood regarding stories that appeared in the first two issues of the magazine:

Wood's original story was entitled 'The End' and was 12 pages long. It was a part of his Wizard King series. Bill DuBay, without Wood's o.k. or knowledge, split the story in two, rearranged pages & panels, rewrote Wood's original script and presented the greatly altered work as two separate stories, changing Wood's original rather charming adult oriented tale into shorter pieces that leaned heavily on the scenes (which were also in Wood's original but not nearly so highlighted as their appearance here) of naked women in bondage being whipped and brutalized. Understandably, Wood was outraged and never worked for Warren again.

DuBay's treatment of Corben and Strnad's Mutant World also alienated the creators. Throughout, DuBay altered Strnad's dialogue to include words and phrases that Strnad has called "a spew of juvenile obscenities." The artwork, also, was altered as one page was arbitrarily flipped right-to-left, with the lettering adjusted to accommodate the change. When approached by Warren to publish an album of the collected episodes, Corben and Strnad politely declined. [Reference: Mutant World 2019 edition, forthcoming]

Controversial stories included issue #3's satirical story "The Harvest" which featured a future where white people hunted black people for sport and ate them, and issue #13's science fiction story "The Crop" where babies are sliced up and processed through factories to provide food for the starving populace. Both stories were written by DuBay.

Despite its controversies, the magazine has been praised for the high quality of its art. The serials Young Sigmond Pavlov and Ghita of Alizarr were both singled out as high quality stories by David A. Roach in The Warren Companion.
