= The Unexpected (1968 comic book) =

DC Comics publication

- Cover to The Unexpected #105 (March 1968), art by Bob Brown.

Publication information
- Publisher: DC Comics
- Schedule: Monthly
- Format: Ongoing series
- Genre: Fantasy; Horror
- Publication date: February/March 1968 – May 1982
- No. of issues: 118
- Main character: Johnny Peril The Mad Mod Witch Judge Gallows The Witches Three Abel

Creative team
- Written by: List: George Kashdan Jack Miller Jack Oleck Martin Pasko
- Penciller: List: Bob Brown Lee Elias Ruben Moreira Howard Purcell Jack Sparling Bruno Premiani Ross Andru Berni Wrightson Dick Dillin John Calnan Jim Aparo Ernie Chan Rich Buckler Wally Wood E. R. Cruz Alfredo Alcala Fred Carrillo Ruben Yandoc Sonny Trinidad Frank Redondo Alex Niño Jess Jodloman Gerry Talaoc Don Newton Marc Silvestri
- Inker: List: George Roussos Joe Giella Murphy Anderson Mike Esposito Frank Giacoia Vince Colletta Tex Blaisdell John Celardo
- Editor: List: Murray Boltinoff (#105–188) Jack C. Harris (#189–212) Dick Giordano (#213) Cary Burkett (#214) Dave Manak (#215–222)

The Unexpected is a fantasy-horror comics anthology series, a continuation of Tales of the Unexpected, published by DC Comics. The Unexpected ran 118 issues, from #105 (February–March 1968) to #222 (May 1982). As a result of the so-called DC Implosion of late 1978, beginning in 1979 The Unexpected absorbed the other DC horror titles House of Secrets, The Witching Hour, and Doorway to Nightmare into its pages. Horror hosts featured in The Unexpected included The Mad Mod Witch, Judge Gallows, Abel, and the Witches Three.

This title is not to be confused with The Unexpected published by DC Comics in 2018.

== Publication history ==
Unlike the predecessor series, The Unexpected was a fantasy anthology at first, then turned into a weird/horror anthology in the style of House of Secrets and House of Mystery.

The series was published in the 100 Page Super Spectacular format from #157 (May–June 1974) to #162 (March–April 1975).

The Unexpected Special was published in 1977 as an issue of DC Special Series.

With issue #189 (January–February 1979), The Unexpected converted to the Dollar Comics format and incorporated the previously cancelled titles House of Secrets, The Witching Hour, and Doorway to Nightmare.

With issue #196 (March 1980), the series was restored to standard size, and rather than three complete issues in one, there was one story each per issue. The House of Secrets content continued through issue #208; The Witching Hour content continued to appear until issue #209 (April 1981), which incorporated the science fiction series Time Warp. The final issue of the series was #222 (May 1982) which included early artwork by Marc Silvestri.

=== 2018 series ===
DC again revived the title in 2018, in the wake of the Dark Nights: Metal event, this time as a mystical superhero team featuring revised versions of Neon the Unknown and Firebrand. It was cancelled after eight issues.

== Regular features ==
The series' first "host" was the Mad Mod Witch, who first appeared in issue #108, the fourth issue of the revived series. The Mad Mod Witch — later known as "Fashion Thing" in Neil Gaiman's The Sandman — acted as host in issues #108–112, 114–116, 140, and 162, while Judge Gallows filled that role in issues #113, 118, 121, 125, and 133. Judge Gallows would also appear years later, alongside Abel and the Witches Three, in issues #203 and 205. The Judge Gallows character would later appear in the final story arc of The Dreaming.

Nick Cardy was the cover artist for The Unexpected for issues #111, 116–117, 119–120, 123, 125–139, and 141–162.

Each "Unexpected" story would always include the word "unexpected" in the last panel. After the series merger with House of Secrets and The Witching Hour, this was only true of the Unexpected section; there would then be complete, advertisement-free issues of The Witching Hour, hosted by its witches, and The House of Secrets, hosted by Abel. The Witching Hour feature was alternated with Doorway to Nightmare starring Madame Xanadu, who appeared in issues #190, 192, 194, and 195.

=== Johnny Peril ===
The series' only continuing feature at any point was "Johnny Peril", which ran from issues #106 to 117. For issues #111 on, the titular protagonist was billed as an "adventurer of the weird". Johnny Peril returned in issues #200 and 205–213.

Johnny Peril's roots, prior to his first appearance in The Unexpected, came in the one-off story "Just a Story" in All-American Comics' Comic Cavalcade #19 (July 1946), by writer–artist Howard Purcell.

With issue #22 (Sept. 1947), the "Just a Story" anthology series gained newspaper-reporter Johnny Peril, who often acted as witness or narrator rather than as an integral part of the narrative. With this issue, the series title became "Johnny Peril Tells Just a Story", eventually changed to "Johnny Peril's Surprise Story" as Johnny became the series' two-fisted hero until the series ended with issue #29 (Nov. 1948). According to Jess Nevins' Encyclopedia of Golden Age Superheroes, "he's an adventurer who tangles with nearly every sort of enemy in nearly every sort of background, from the jungles of the Congo to the concrete jungles of New York to the moon".

By then the character was appearing in his own backup feature in All-Star Comics, beginning with issue #42 (Sept. 1948). Purcell remained for the first few All-Star stories, with artists Joe Kubert, Gil Kane, Carmine Infantino and others later working on the feature through #57 (March 1951). Johnny went on to star in the fifth and final issue of Danger Trail (April 1951). His last appearances before his Silver Age return in 1968 came in Sensation Comics #107-116 (Feb. 1952 - Aug. 1953, later retitled Sensation Mystery #110-116) where artists included Alex Toth and Frank Giacoia.

=== 2011 one-shot ===
A one-shot special of The Unexpected was published by Vertigo in 2011.

== Collected editions ==
- The Steve Ditko Omnibus Volume 1 includes The Unexpected #189: "Dead Man's Eyes" by Jack Oleck and Steve Ditko and The Unexpected #221: "EM the Energy Monster" by Ditko, 480 pages, September 2011 (ISBN 1-4012-3111-X).
- DC Finest: Horror: The Devil's Doorway collects The Unexpected #113–117 along with other DC horror comics from 1969–1970. 978-1799502807
