= Secrets of Haunted House =

Horror-suspense anthology comic book series

- Secrets of Haunted House #1 (April–May 1975), art by Luis Dominguez.

Publication information
- Publisher: DC Comics
- Schedule: Bimonthly (#1–14); Monthly (#15–46)
- Format: Ongoing series
- Genre: Horror
- Publication date: (#1–14) April–May 1975 – October–November 1978 (#15–46) August 1979–March 1982
- No. of issues: 46
- Main characters: Cain, Abel, Eve, Destiny, Lucien

Creative team
- Written by: List: E. Nelson Bridwell, Gary Cohn, J. M. DeMatteis, Arnold Drake, Paul Kupperberg, Elliot S. Maggin, Sheldon Mayer, David Michelinie, Dan Mishkin, Bob Rozakis, Steve Skeates
- Penciller: List: Eduardo Barreto, Howard Bender, Jerry Bingham, Stephen R. Bissette, Fred Carrillo, Ernie Chan, E. R. Cruz, Paris Cullins, Tony DeZuniga, Steve Ditko, Bill Draut, Luis Dominguez, Lee Elias, Ramona Fradon, Michael Golden, Adrian Gonzales, Greg LaRocque, Win Mortimer, Michael Netzer, Don Newton, Alex Niño, Nestor Redondo, Jack Sparling, Dan Spiegle, Tom Sutton, Gerry Talaoc, Vicatan, Trevor Von Eeden
- Inker: List: Bob Smith, Romeo Tanghal
- Editor: List: Joe Orlando (#1–5) Paul Levitz (#6–14) Jack C. Harris (#15–38) Dick Giordano (#39) Cary Burkett (#40) Dave Manak (#41–46)

Secrets of Haunted House was a horror-suspense comics anthology series published by American company DC Comics from 1975 to 1978 and 1979 to 1982.

== Publication history ==
The series began in April–May 1975. Like its predecessor Secrets of Sinister House, Secrets of Haunted House was originally "hosted" by Cain, Abel, Eve, and Destiny who had moved over from Weird Mystery Tales. By issue #10 (Feb.–March 1978), Destiny was the only one of these who remained a regular. In issue #40 (Sept. 1981), Abel returned with no further mention of Destiny.

A Secrets of Haunted House Special was published in 1978 as part of the DC Special Series umbrella title. Secrets of Haunted House was a temporary victim of the so-called "DC Implosion". With issue #14 (Oct.–Nov. 1978), it was cancelled but revived a year later with issue #15 (Aug. 1979). The title continued until issue #46 (March 1982).

The Mister E character was introduced in issue #31 (Dec. 1980) by writer Bob Rozakis and artist Dan Spiegle and became a recurring character for the next ten issues. The final Mister E story appeared in issue #41 (Oct. 1981).

The series' letter column was titled "The Haunted Mailbox".

== Collected editions ==
- The Steve Ditko Omnibus, Volume 1 includes stories from Secrets of Haunted House #9, 12, 41, and 45, 480 pages, September 2011, ISBN 1-4012-3111-X
