= Nestor Redondo =

Filipino comics artist (1928-1995)

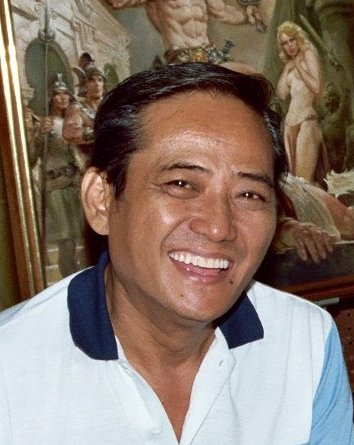
- Redondo in 1982
- Born: May 4, 1928 Candon, Ilocos Sur, Philippine Islands, U.S.
- Died: December 30, 1995 (aged 67) Los Angeles County, California, U.S.
- Areas: Penciller, Inker, Publisher, Animation Designer, Painter
- Notable works: Darna, Limited Collectors' Edition #C-36 (The Bible), Rima, the Jungle Girl, Savage Sword of Conan, Swamp Thing
- Awards: Inkpot Award, 1979

Nestor P. Redondo (May 4, 1928 – December 30, 1995) was a Filipino comics artist best known for his work for DC Comics, Marvel Comics, and other American publishers in the 1970s and early 1980s. In his native Philippines, he is known for co-creating the superheroine Darna.

== Early life ==
Redondo was born May 4, 1928, in Candon, Ilocos Sur, in what was then the United States territory of the Philippine Islands. His brother, Francisco "Quico" Redondo, was a comics artist as well.

He studied architecture at the Mapúa Institute of Technology but left it to begin a career in illustration.

== Career ==
=== Early work ===
Redondo began his career drawing Filipino komiks serials, which were written by his brother Virgilio, including Mars Ravelo's Darna series. In 1969 and 1970 Redondo did the four-page serial ”Mga Kasaysayang Buhat sa Bibliya” (“Tales from the Bible”) in each issue of Superyor Komiks Magasin, which was produced by his company Nestor Redondo Publications. This company launched a program of on-the-job training for young writers and artists.

=== U.S. work ===
In the 1970s, Redondo began to do work for publishers in the United States. His earliest U.S. credit is penciling and inking the ten-page story "The King Is Dead", by writer Jack Oleck, in DC Comics' House of Mystery #194 (Sept. 1971). Through the 1970s, Redondo drew dozens of such supernatural anthology stories for DC titles including House of Secrets, The Phantom Stranger, Secrets of Sinister House, The Unexpected, Weird War Tales, and The Witching Hour. He drew six of the seven issues of Rima, the Jungle Girl (May 1974 – March 1975), based on the heroine of a Victorian novel, as well as Swamp Thing #11–23 (Aug. 1974 – July 1976), and DC's tabloid-sized one-shot collection of Bible stories, cover-titled The Bible but officially titled Limited Collectors' Edition #C-36 (July 1975). Nestor Redondo and his brother Frank Redondo often collaborated and were credited together as the "Redondo Studio", including on the Ragman series for DC.

Panel, DC Comics' Rima, the Jungle Girl #6 (Feb.–March 1975). Art by Nestor Redondo.

In 1970, Redondo was approached by Vincent Fago of Pendulum Press to illustrate stories for that publisher’s new line of comic book adaptations of literary classics. Redondo helped Fago recruit fellow Filipino comics artists, who illustrated almost every comic Pendulum produced. From 1973 to 1979, Redondo illustrated many stories in the Pendulum Illustrated Classics line, including Dracula and Dr. Jekyll and Mr. Hyde — adaptations which were reprinted by Marvel Comics three years later as Marvel Classics Comics. Other adaptations illustrated by Redondo for Pendulum included The Great Adventures of Sherlock Holmes, some Edgar Allan Poe stories, The Odyssey, and Romeo and Juliet. In addition, Redondo illustrated a Pendulum comic-book history of the American Civil War, and biographies of Madame Curie, Albert Einstein, and Abraham Lincoln.

In the mid-1980s, Redondo inked the Eclipse Comics time-travel series Aztec Ace, by writer Doug Moench and pencilers Michael Hernandez and Dan Day. In 1990, he contributed to the second issue of the Marvel Comics superhero series Solarman as well as to an issue of Innovation Comics' Legends of the Stargrazers. Redondo collaborated with writer Roy Thomas on an adaptation of Robert E. Howard's Marchers of Valhalla in the mid-1990s, but the finished comic book never saw print.

=== Christian comics ===
More regularly, Redondo contributed to various Christian comics. In addition to DC Comics' 1975 one-shot collection of Bible stories, Redondo illustrated Marx, Lenin, Mao and Christ, published in 1977 by Open Doors (and reprinted in 2010 by Calvary Comics); Pendulum's Ben-Hur, published in 1978; Born Again Comics #2 (featuring the story of Filipino actor-turned-evangelist Fred Galang) in 1988; and Aida-Zee, Behold 3-D, and Christian Comics & Games #0 and #1, produced in the 1990s by The Nate Butler Studio. Redondo was a panelist for the first Christian-comics panel of San Diego Comic-Con in 1992.

In preparation for the First International Christian Comics Training Conference in Tagaytay, the Philippines, in January 1996, Redondo wrote On Realistic Illustration for his main teaching session, but died before he was able to deliver it personally.

== Death ==
Redondo was living in Los Angeles County, California, at the time of his death on December 30, 1995.

== Awards ==
In 1979, Redondo received the Inkpot Award at San Diego Comic-Con.

== Bibliography ==
=== Continuity Comics ===
- The Revengers Featuring Megalith #3 (1986)

=== DC Comics ===
- The Amazing World of DC Comics #6 (two pages) (1975)
- Ghosts #8, 13 (1972–1973)
- G.I. Combat #240 (1982)
- House of Mystery #194–195, 197, 202–203, 211, 214, 217, 219, 226–227, 229, 235, 241, 287, 302, 308 (1971–1982)
- House of Secrets #95, 99, 102, 104, 113, 116, 134, 139–140 (1971–1976)
- Limited Collectors' Edition #C–36 (The Bible) (1975)
- Phantom Stranger vol. 2 #32, 35–36 (Black Orchid) (1974–1975)
- Rima, the Jungle Girl #1–6 (1974–1975)
- Secrets of Haunted House #3–5, 29 (1975–1980)
- Secrets of Sinister House #7 (1972)
- Sgt. Rock #307 (1977)
- Swamp Thing #11–23 (1974–1976)
- Tales of Ghost Castle #1 (1975)
- Tarzan #232 (one page) (1974)
- The Unexpected #133, 155, 162, 192, 195 (1972–1980)
- Weird Mystery Tales #9 (1973)
- Weird War Tales #13, 51 (1973–1977)
- The Witching Hour #20–21, 23, 34, 65 (1972–1976)

=== Eclipse Comics ===
- Aztec Ace #1–8 (1984)

=== Innovation Publishing ===
- Legends of the Stargrazers #1 (1989)

=== Marvel Comics ===
- Marvel Classics Comics #1 (Dr. Jekyll and Mr. Hyde); #9 (Dracula) (1976)
- Official Handbook of the Marvel Universe #3–4, 8, 13–14 (1983–1984)
- Official Handbook of the Marvel Universe Deluxe Edition #3, 9, 18–19 (1986–1987)
- Red Sonja vol. 3 #2–3 (1983)
- Savage Sword of Conan #51, 85, 90 (1980–1983)
- Solarman #2 (1990)

=== Nate Butler Studio, Inc. ===
- Aida-Zee #1 (1990)
- The Monster tract (1992)
- Behold 3-D #1 (1996)
- Christian Comics & Games #0 (1996)
- Christian Comics & Games #1 (1997)

=== Pacific Comics ===
- Alien Worlds #1 (1982)

=== Pendulum Press ===
- Pendulum Illustrated Classics
  - Dr. Jekyll and Mr. Hyde (1973) – reprinted in Marvel Classics Comics #1 (1976)
  - Dracula (1973) — reprinted in Marvel Classics Comics #9 (1976)
  - Sir Arthur Conan Doyle: The Great Adventures of Sherlock Holmes (1974)
  - Ben-Hur: A Tale of the Christ (1978)
  - The Odyssey (1979)
  - Romeo and Juliet (1979)
- Basic Illustrated History of America
  - The Civil War, 1850-1876 (1976)
- Pendulum Illustrated Biography Series
  - Abraham Lincoln (1979)
  - Madame Curie/Albert Einstein (1979)

=== Peter Pan Records ===
- Battle for the Planet of the Apes ##PR21 (1974)
- Beneath the Planet of the Apes #PR20 (1974)
- Escape from the Planet of the Apes #PR19 (1974)
- Planet of the Apes #PR18 (1974)

=== Warren Publishing ===
- 1994 #21 (1981)
- The Rook #12 (1981)

=== Western Publishing ===
- The Twilight Zone #62 (1975)

Preceded by n/a	Rima, the Jungle Girl artist 1974–1975	Succeeded by Abe Ocampo
Preceded by Bernie Wrightson	Swamp Thing artist 1974–1976	Succeeded by Ernie Chan and Fred Carrillo
Preceded by Tony DeZuniga	"Black Orchid" feature in Phantom Stranger artist 1974–1975	Succeeded by Fred Carrillo
