= Weird War Tales =

Comic book series

- Cover of Weird War Tales #1 (September–October 1971), art by Joe Kubert.

Publication information
- Publisher: DC Comics
- Schedule: Monthly
- Format: List: (vol. 1): Ongoing (vol. 2): Limited series and a one-shot special
- Genre: List: War Fantasy Horror Science fiction
- Publication date: List: (vol. 1) September–October 1971 – June 1983 (vol. 2) June 1997 – September 1997
- No. of issues: List: (vol. 1): 124 (vol. 2): 4

Creative team
- Written by: List: (vol. 1) J. M. DeMatteis (70, 72, 76, 79, 85, 91, 93-97, 102, 105, 108), Arnold Drake (13, 15-16, 18-19, 37, 55-57), Steve Englehart (50, 60, 73), Steve Gerber (80), Jack C. Harris (51-53, 67, 74, 122), Sheldon Mayer (10-11, 14, 42, 44), Roger McKenzie, (61-63, 68), Jack Oleck (13, 15-16, 20-22, 24, 27, 29, 33, 35, 38-40, 42-44, 46-47, 49, 51-54, 58-59, 67, 71), Mike W. Barr (84, 93, 99-100, 104, 108), Dan Mishkin (95, 101-102, 107, 123), Robert Kanigher (1, 2, 4, 8-9, 12, 17, 31, 36, 52, 59, 80, 87, 89, 94-96, 98-99, 101, 103, 105-106, 108-124)
- Penciller: List: (vol. 1) Tony DeZuniga Alfredo Alcala Gerry Talaoc Nestor Redondo Alex Niño Alfredo Alcala Ernie Chan Bill Draut Jess Jodloman Frank Redondo E. R. Cruz Fred Carrillo Mike Grell Frank Miller Howard Chaykin José Luis García-López Marshall Rogers Ruben Yandoc Romeo Tanghal Bob Hall Steve Ditko Dan Spiegle Marc Silvestri Carmine Infantino Rich Buckler (vol. 2) Richard Corben Eric Shanower Paul Pope Dave Gibbons Paul Gulacy Sam Glanzman Eduardo Risso Duncan Fegredo Cully Hammer
- Inker: List: (vol. 1) Terry Austin Bob Wiacek Joe Giella Larry Mahlstedt Bob Smith John Celardo Sal Trapani Frank Giacoia

Weird War Tales is a war comic book title with supernatural overtones published by DC Comics. It was published from September - October 1971 to June 1983.

== Publication history ==
The original title ran for 12 years and 124 issues. It was an anthology series that told war stories with horror, mystery, fantasy, and science fiction elements. Changes in the Comics Code Authority made the use of horror elements possible. The first seven issues were reprinted material. Each issue beginning with issue #8 was hosted by Death, usually depicted as a skeleton dressed in a different military uniform each issue. The title's name was inspired by editor Joe Orlando. Walt Simonson's first professional published comic book work appeared in Weird War Tales #10 (January 1973). Roger McKenzie and Frank Miller's first collaboration was on a two-page story published in Weird War Tales #68 (October 1978). Recurring characters began to appear late in the series run, notably the G.I. Robot, and the return of "The War that Time Forgot" which originally ran in Star Spangled War Stories. Writer J. M. DeMatteis and penciler Pat Broderick created the Creature Commandos in Weird War Tales #93 (November 1980).

Several issues featured a series of short vignettes titled "The Day After Doomsday" featuring largely doomed characters dealing with various threats and harsh ironies of living in a post-nuclear war apocalyptic landscape. The first few stories dealt with a society reduced to medieval ways seven centuries after a war but most others dealt with the near-term aftermath, with the unexpected results of radiation or infrastructure damage almost always catching the characters by surprise.

Other stories featured robot soldiers, ghosts, the undead, and other paranormal characters from different eras of time.

=== Revival ===
Cover of Weird War Tales (vol. 2) #1 (June 1997), art by Glenn Fabry.

Weird War Tales was revived for DC Comics' Vertigo imprint in 1997. It was published as a four-issue limited series, followed by two one-shot special issues in 2000 and 2010.

== Collected editions ==
- Showcase Presents: Weird War Tales collects Weird War Tales #1–21, 576 pages, December 2012, ISBN 1-4012-3694-4
- America at War includes Weird War Tales #3: "The Pool" by Len Wein, Marv Wolfman and Russ Heath, 247 pages, July 1979, ISBN 978-0671249533
- Showcase Presents: The Great Disaster featuring the Atomic Knights includes "The Day After Doomsday" stories from Weird War Tales #22-23, 30, 32, 40, 42–44, 46–49, 51–53, 64, 68, 69, and 123, 576 pages, June 2014, ISBN 978-1401242909
- The Steve Ditko Omnibus Volume 1 includes stories from Weird War Tales #46, 49, 95, 99, and 104–106, 480 pages, September 2011, ISBN 1-4012-3111-X
- DC Through the 80s: The End of Eras includes Weird War Tales #93, 520 pages, December 2020, ISBN 978-1779500878
- The Creature Commandos collects stories from Weird War Tales #93, 97, 100, 102, 105, 108–112, 114–119, 121, and 124, 288 pages, December 2013, ISBN 978-1401243821

== See also ==
- Weird Western Tales, a sister title dealing in Weird West stories.
