= Ghosts (comics) =

Comics anthology series published by DC Comics

- Cover of Ghosts #1 (September–October 1971), art by Nick Cardy.

Publication information
- Publisher: DC Comics
- Schedule: Monthly
- Format: Ongoing series
- Genre: Horror
- Publication date: September–October 1971 to May 1982
- No. of issues: 112
- Main character: Dr. 13 - The Ghost-Breaker (1980–1981)

Creative team
- Written by: List: Leo Dorfman Jack C. Harris Paul Kupperberg Sheldon Mayer
- Penciller: List: Jim Aparo Tony DeZuniga Bob Brown John Calnan Gerry Talaoc E. R. Cruz Ruben Yandoc Buddy Gernale Alfredo Alcala Nestor Redondo Frank Redondo Ernie Chan Jess Jodloman Fred Carrillo Terry Henson Don Newton Win Mortimer Marc Silvestri Keith Giffen
- Inker: List: Tony DeZuniga Tex Blaisdell Vince Colletta
- Editor: List: Murray Boltinoff (#1–72) Jack C. Harris (#73–101) Dick Giordano (#102–103) Cary Burkett (#104) Dave Manak (#105–112)

Ghosts is a horror comics anthology series published by DC Comics for 112 issues from September–October 1971 to May 1982. Its tagline was "True Tales of the Weird and Supernatural" (December 1978), changed to "New Tales of the Weird and Supernatural", as of #75 (April 1979), and dropped after #104 (September 1981).

== Publication history ==
The comic was created by Leo Dorfman, who wrote all of the stories in the first issue. To avoid having it seem that a single writer was monopolizing the comic, editor Murray Boltinoff had Dorfman use the pseudonyms "Geoff Brown" (Dorfman's son was named "Geoff" and his wife's maiden name was "Brown") and "David George".

Ghosts was one of several horror-mystery-suspense DC Comics series launched in 1971, along with The Dark Mansion of Forbidden Love and The Sinister House of Secret Love. According to DC Comics writer and executive Paul Levitz, though Ghosts "wasn't a fan favorite (then or in retrospect), it was a disproportionately good seller". Nick Cardy was the cover artist for Ghosts for issues #1–6, 8–15, and 17–36.

Each issue of Ghosts carried multiple stories of the supernatural. The stories were prefaced by a short description introducing the premise and ended with a summation of how a mysterious justice was dealt to the evildoers of the tale. The first issue of this series carried the singular title Ghost in its indicia, but everywhere else, including advance promotional house ads and even on its own cover, it was the plural Ghosts, as even the indicia would read from #2 on. Limited Collectors' Edition #C–32 (Dec. 1974–Jan. 1975) reprinted stories from Ghosts #1, 3–6 and featured new material by Leo Dorfman and artists Gerry Talaoc, E. R. Cruz, and Frank Redondo.

Starting with issue #37 (April 1975), a new regular feature was added. At the front of each book a page of single panel depictions of alleged ghost sightings were listed in the fashion of Robert L. Ripley's Believe it or Not! features. These one-page introductory spreads were usually titled "Ghosts and the Supernatural". A Ghosts Special was published in December 1977 as part of the DC Special Series umbrella title. Ghosts #95 (Dec. 1980), introduced the series' first continuing-character feature, "Dr. 13 - The Ghost-Breaker". The character encounted the Spectre in a three-issue storyline. The "Dr. Thirteen" feature last appeared in #102 (July 1981).

For the most part, Ghosts was not "hosted" by a recurring character used in a framing sequence. In issue #104 (September-October 1981), however, Squire Shade was introduced as the title's host. He lasted in that position until the series was cancelled with issue #112 (May 1982).

=== 2012 one-shot ===
A Ghosts one-shot was published in October 2012 under the Vertigo imprint and featured a story by Geoff Johns and Jeff Lemire.

== Collected editions ==
- Showcase Presents: Ghosts collects Ghosts #1-18, 512 pages, February 2012, ISBN 1-4012-3317-1
- The Steve Ditko Omnibus Volume 1 includes Ghosts #77: "Ghost, Where Do You Hide?" by Jack C. Harris and Steve Ditko and Ghosts #111: "Shrieeeeeek!" by Sheldon Mayer and Ditko, 480 pages, September 2011, ISBN 1-4012-3111-X
