= House of Secrets (DC Comics) =

Anthology comic book series

- Cover of House of Secrets #1 (November - December 1956), art by Ruben Moreira.

Publication information
- Publisher: DC Comics
- Schedule: Varied between monthly and bi-monthly
- Format: Ongoing series
- Genre: Horror; Fantasy
- Publication date: List: (vol. 1) (original run) November/December 1956 – September/October 1966 (revival) September/October 1969 - October/November 1978 (vol. 2) October 1996 - December 1998
- No. of issues: List: (vol. 1): 154 (vol. 2): 25

Creative team
- Written by: List: (vol. 1) Bob Haney Len Wein (vol. 2) Steven T. Seagle
- Penciller: List: (vol. 1) Bernard Baily Ruben Moreira John Prentice Jim Mooney Jack Kirby Mort Meskin Lee Elias Dick Dillin Bill Draut Gray Morrow Bernie Wrightson Wally Wood Jack Sparling Michael Kaluta Jim Aparo Alfredo Alcala Tony DeZuniga Nestor Redondo E.R. Cruz Alex Niño Rudy Nebres Ernie Chan Gerry Talaoc Leo Durañona (vol. 2) Teddy Kristiansen
- Inker: List: (vol. 1) Frank Giacoia
- Editor: List: (vol. 1) Jack Schiff (#1–56 and 66–80) Murray Boltinoff (#57–65) Joe Orlando (#81 and 91–147) Dick Giordano (#82–90) Paul Levitz (#148–154) (vol. 2) Shelly Bond (#1–25)

The House of Secrets a mystery, fantasy, and horror comics anthology published by DC Comics. It is the title that introduced the character the Swamp Thing. It had a companion series titled The House of Mystery.

== Publication history ==
=== First series ===
The original Silver Age series ran 80 issues, from November/December 1956 to September/October 1966. In addition to short "one-off" stories, several issues featured the adventures of modern-dress sorcerer Mark Merlin, who first appeared in issue #23 (August 1959). The dual-personality supervillain Eclipso ("Hero and Villain in One Man!") was created by Bob Haney and Lee Elias, introduced in issue #61 (August 1963), and continued to the series' end. Prince Ra-Man was introduced in #73 (July - August 1965) as a Doctor Strange-style "replacement" for Mark Merlin. Ra-Man twice battled Eclipso. The "Prince Ra-Man" feature ended in House of Secrets #80 (September - October 1966), the final issue of the series. Other continuing features included "Peter Puptent, Explorer"; "Dolly and the Professor"; "Doctor Rocket"; and "Moolah the Mystic".

=== Revival (second run) ===
Cover of The House of Secrets #92 (July 1971), introducing Swamp Thing, art by Bernie Wrightson.

The series was revived three years later with a definite article as The House of Secrets, beginning with issue #81 (August - Sept. 1969). The horror and suspense tales were introduced by a host named Abel, who would also host the satirical comic Plop!. His brother, Cain, hosted The House of Mystery.

The title had an early breakthrough for the mainstream part of the medium: issue #83 had a story, "The Stuff that Dreams are Made of", written by Marv Wolfman. As part of the framing story, Abel introduces the story by telling a tale told to him by a "wandering Wolfman". Upon examination, the censor bureau, the Comics Code Authority refused to give the issue its seal of approval since it mentions a wolfman, which was specifically forbidden along with other classic monsters. Editor Gerry Conway explained that the term referred to Marv Wolfman, and the CCA conceded on the condition that the distinction be made obvious with a writer's credit in the story. That directive was complied with and suddenly the editorship of DC was inundated with complaints from other writers because of Wolfman's special consideration of a printed credit. In response, the editorship made writers credits standard practice for future publications.

Swamp Thing first appeared in The House of Secrets #92 (July 1971) in a stand-alone story written by Len Wein and drawn by Bernie Wrightson. The woman appearing on the cover of this issue was modeled after future comics writer Louise Simonson. The Patchwork Man, a character from the Swamp Thing ongoing series, was intended to be an ongoing feature, but only appeared in one issue.

The revival of The House of Secrets, sporting many covers by Neal Adams, Bernie Wrightson and Michael Kaluta, ran through issue #154 (Nov. 1978), with six months passing between issues #140 (February - March 1976) and 141 (August - September 1976). Cancelled as a result of the DC Implosion, it was then "merged" into The Unexpected with issue #189 through issue #199. The series was 68 ad-free pages, allowing all three portions to be full-length issues.

The House of Secrets also came to be the name of the actual edifice in which Abel lives. Writer Mike Friedrich and artist Jerry Grandenetti introduced the house and explained its origins. The building was constructed for Senator Sanderson using only materials from Kentucky, and went under the enchantment that only pure-blood Kentuckians would be able to live there. Later, Sanderson's wife went insane in the upper floors, leading him to sell the house. The next four owners, none of them pure Kentuckians, were driven away for various reasons. The following owner attempted to move the home from its original location, but the house tore itself free from its trailer, ran its owner over a cliff to his death and settled less than 200 yards from the Kentucky state line in a graveyard. Whether by fate or some mystical alignment, the companion House of Mystery stands at the other end of the graveyard. Shortly after this, Abel was driven to the house and entrusted as its caretaker by a man who revealed himself to be an aspect of the House's existence, but making vague references to an employer. Abel was showing living in the House of Mystery in the quarterly DC Special #4, published one month earlier (July - Sept. 1969).

In the 1980s and 1990s, The Sandman series revealed that the House of Secrets edifice exists both in the real world of the DC Universe and in the Dreaming, as a repository for secrets of all kinds. Abel would later become a recurring character in The Sandman (vol. 2) and related series such as The Dreaming.

=== Second series ===
DC's Vertigo imprint revived the name House of Secrets as a new title and concept. Here the House of Secrets was a mobile manor, appearing in different places. The building itself is haunted by the Juris, a group of ghosts who summon those with secrets in order to judge them and pass sentence. To the Juris, all offenses carry the same weight, from rape and murder to simply lying at a crucial moment. A runaway named Rain Harper stumbled upon the House of Secrets and took up a position as an unwilling witness to the Juris trials, validating the judgments and either condemning the tried souls to imprisonment in the basement, or setting them free to live their life purged of their secret.

Starting fresh with a new #1 (October 1996), this series ran 25 issues, plus a two-part special House of Secrets: Facade. This House of Secrets series was creator-owned, except for its title which was "licensed" by DC to the series' creators. The letters column in issue #6 indicates that, for legal reasons, they could not include Cain and Abel in the stories. This series was used for the framing story in the first Vertigo Winter's Edge special, featuring Rain happening upon an art gallery in the House whose paintings allow her to see stories from The Sandman (vol. 2), The Dreaming, John Constantine, Hellblazer, The Invisibles, The Books of Magic, The Minx, Sandman Mystery Theatre and Nevada.

In the mid-2000s, the Secret Six made their headquarters in the House of Secrets. Scandal Savage stated in issue #5 of Villains United that the House would not show up on technological scans or mystical surveillance. She also said that Mockingbird claimed the House was a "house of victims".

== In other media ==
The House of Secrets appears in the Young Justice episode "Secrets". This version is a normal magic shop.

== Collected editions ==
- The Jack Kirby Omnibus includes stories from House of Secrets #3–4, 8, and 12, 304 pages, August 2011, ISBN 1-4012-3107-1
- Showcase Presents Eclipso collects the Eclipso stories from House of Secrets #61–80, 296 pages, August 2009, ISBN 1-4012-2315-X
- Showcase Presents House of Secrets
  - Volume 1 collects The House of Secrets #81–98, 544 pages, August 2008, ISBN 978-1-4012-1818-8
  - Volume 2 collects The House of Secrets #99–119, 496 pages, October 2009, ISBN 1-4012-2523-3
- The Steve Ditko Omnibus Volume 1 includes The House of Secrets #139: "The Devil's Daughter" and The House of Secrets #148: "Sorcerer's Apprentice", both by Jack Oleck and Steve Ditko, 480 pages, September 2011, ISBN 1-4012-3111-X
- House of Secrets: The Bronze Age Omnibus
  - Volume 1 collects The House of Secrets #81–111, 864 pages, February 13, 2018, ISBN 978-1-4012-7684-3
  - Volume 2 collects The House of Secrets #112–154, 872 pages, December 31, 2019, ISBN 978-1-4012-9465-6
- House of Secrets Omnibus collects House of Secrets (vol. 2) #1–25, 752 pages, April 2013, ISBN 978-1-4012-3673-1
- DC Finest: Horror: The Devil's Doorway collects House of Secrets #81–85 along with other DC horror comics from 1969-1970. ISBN 978-1799502807
