= Jess Jodloman =

Filipino comics artist (1925–2018)

Jess Joldloman
- Born: 25 February 1925 The Philippines
- Died: 20 March 2018
- Areas: Writer, Penciller, Artist, Inker

Jesus Joldloman (25 February 1925 – 20 March 2018) was a Filipino comics artist best known for his 1970s work for DC Comics and Marvel Comics, which he signed Jess Jodloman.
