= Seth Fisher =

American comic book artist (1972–2006)

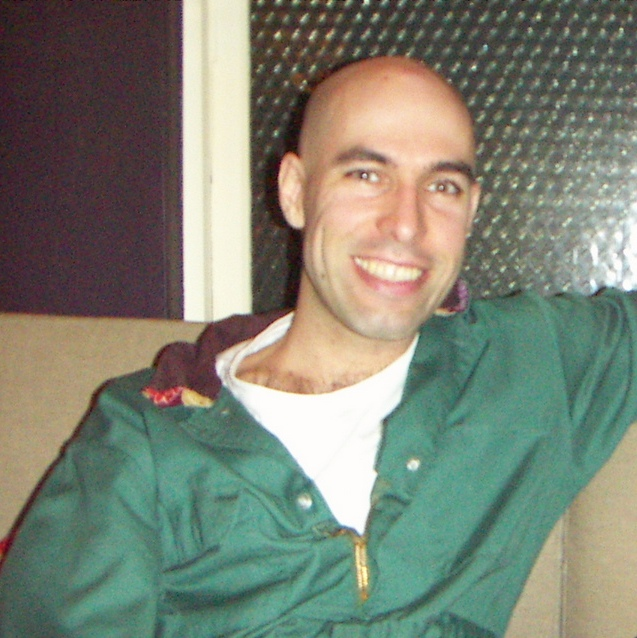
- Born: Seth Steven Fisher; July 22, 1972 Seattle, Washington
- Died: January 30, 2006 (aged 33) Osaka, Japan
- Areas: Penciller, Inker, Colourist
- Notable works: Green Lantern: Willworld; Flash: Time Flies; Vertigo Pop. Tokyo

Seth Fisher (July 22, 1972 – January 30, 2006) was an American comic book artist.

== Biography ==
Seth Fisher was born in Seattle in 1972, and lived in Coronado with his mother from age 5 to 10, until his mother remarried and the family moved to the East Coast with the Navy. In junior high school Fisher went to live with his father in Custer, South Dakota; his mother and stepfather soon moved back to Coronado, and he came every summer to visit.

Fisher decided he wanted to be a comic book artist after attending his first San Diego Comic-Con when he was a freshman in college, circa 1991. After that, he started attending every year, bringing a portfolio of his work and standing in line for an editor at DC or Marvel Comics to look through the work and offer a real life critique. By the time he was 23, Fisher's work had improved enough to receive some real attention from professionals, though so far nothing that turned into a paycheck.

After graduating from Colorado College in 1994 (with a degree in mathematics), Fisher went to Japan with the JET Programme, to teach English in a rural Japanese high school on the small Oki Islands. His initial attraction to Japan was its comic book culture. Fisher studied the intricacies of manga, and wanted to go to a country where an adult could read a comic book in public without feeling the need to hide it behind a copy of Newsweek.

Fisher spent four years in Japan, and during that time started looking for a writer to do a comic with.

== Career ==
Fisher first gained mainstream recognition for his and Andrew Dabb's Vertigo series Happydale: Devils in the Desert. Fisher met Dabb online in 1996, and they did an 8-page mini-comic that gave a feel for the story to pitch to a publisher. None of the contacted publishers accepted the story as, at the time, Fisher's style was considered too risky to publish.

We submitted an 8 page sample of Happydale to a lot of different publishers. Slave Labor, Caliber, Antarctic and Image. Slave Labor and Caliber never responded. Antarctic showed interest but didn't see the book as marketable, it's no Warrior Nun Areala.

A lot of the editors said: "We love what you are doing, but it's not like anything we have seen before so we don't want to take the chance."

Eventually, Happydale was picked up by Jim Valentino for his Non-Line imprint, which folded when the book was half-done. After that, Fisher decided to finish the story to have it ready to be published, and took six months off work. In the meantime, he was contacted by Heavy Metal and Cricket magazines and did a few short stories for the first and illustrated a few prose stories for the latter.

Upon completing the project, Fisher took it to SDCC '98, where he was immediately recognized by Andy Helfer. Helfer liked the presented work, agreed to pass it to Karen Berger, then-Vertigo editor, and in the meantime assigned Fisher to do some work for his Paradox Press imprint.

In 1999, Fisher was hired by Presto Studios as one of the designers for Myst III: Exile, and took a year off of comics to work on it. After the game was completed, Fisher came back to DC with art samples and a story idea he pitched to editor Joey Cavalieri. However, after a brainstorming session, the idea was shelved and it was decided to have the presented art style as a starting point for a Hal Jordan story. Cavalieri assigned J. M. DeMatteis, then-writer of Jordan (in the Spectre incarnation) to script the project.

I wanted a writer that would shrug off some of the spandex cliches that I was worried could limit my art, but still tackle the fantastic. I wanted it to be both surreal and yet grounded at the same time. Joey suggested Marc, and we were off and running.

At SDCC '00, Shelly Bond, Fisher's editor at Vertigo, introduced him to writer Jonathan Vankin and asked them to come up with a story set in Japan as she knew both of them had experience living there. After completing Green Lantern: Willworld, Fisher was eager to do more, so he was given a year-old Flash script by John Rozum. The Flash story had no deadline, so Fisher was able to work on both that and what would eventually become Vertigo Pop! Tokyo as well as a Batman story with Dan Curtis Johnson and J. H. Williams III (that wouldn't be released until three years later as "Snow" arc of Legends of the Dark Knight series). After finishing those projects, he contributed two fill-in issues to his then-favorite ongoing, John Arcudi and Tan Eng Huat's Doom Patrol.

In 2003, Fisher was nominated for an Eisner Award in "Best Penciller/Inker" category for Flash: Time Flies and Vertigo Pop! Tokyo.

After the expiration of his exclusive contract with DC (signed in 2001, renewed in 2002), Fisher took another break from comics to focus on his marriage and, later, the birth of son. In the meantime, he produced album covers in Finland and his adopted home of Japan, as well as some work for QuickJapan magazine and Dentsu ad agency.

Fisher returned to comics once again in 2005, wanting to do a Fantastic Four or Iron Man project. Zeb Wells, writer of the eventual mini-series, recalled in an October 2005 interview,

I got a call from Cory Sedlmeier at Marvel saying that they wanted to get a Fantastic Four/Iron Man story together for Seth to draw. I thought about it and didn't really have any ideas, then I saw Seth's artwork and I got inspired. I ended up tossing and turning in bed for three hours coming up with the outline in my head. I mapped out the four issues in outline form, then sent the pitch to Cory. From phone call to my completed pitch was probably a month, so it percolated for awhile.

In a 1999 interview, Andrew Dabb stated he and Fisher had a sequel for Happydale planned sometime in the future; Zeb Wells planned to reunite with Fisher on an Ant-Man story; unfortunately, neither of these nor any other possible future Fisher projects ever came to be.

== Death ==
J. H. Williams III first broke the news of Fisher's death in a post at Barbelith Underground:

I just received some very saddening news this evening. My friend seth fisher has died. He was a great artist, and I had the pleasure of calling him my friend. I also had the pleasure of working with him. He had such a great outlook to life and was always willing to think of things from another perspective. His work is some of most unique I have seen. For those who don't know what Seth Fisher has done in comics, do a search for his name. Pick up anything he has done and you will be amazed and delighted forever by his imagination. Myself and those who knew him personally will miss him enormously. He always had this way to make you laugh and not to take things too seriously. Cheers Seth.

The news was confirmed later that day by most major comics websites. Seth Fisher died in late January 2006 as a result of injuries suffered in a fall from a seventh story roof of an Osaka, Japan club where he went to celebrate the completion of the last issue of Big in Japan.

Three works have been released posthumously: a project titled Build Your Own Backpack Alarm, written by Shar Levine and Leslie Johnstone – a do-it-yourself guide to building a personal backpack security system – for Scholastic, a short story titled "Freddy Wertham Goes to Hell" written by Joe Hill and finished by Fisher's friend Langdon Foss, and Bob's Amazing Life, a children's book written and illustrated by Fisher for his son.

== Personal life ==
In 1998, Fisher married his college girlfriend, April Brody, and they moved from Japan to Florence, Italy for a year so that April could study Italian. When Fisher was hired by Presto, he and April moved back to the United States to San Diego.

Some years later, they divorced, and in 2002 Fisher moved back to Japan for six weeks of photographic research for Vertigo Pop! Tokyo. Acquiring an artist's visa to remain in Japan, Fisher reconnected with an old friend named Hisako Sugiyama, who would become his second wife.

On May 5, 2004, the couple's son Toufuu Fisher was born.

== Bibliography ==
=== Interior work ===
- The Big Book of... (anthology, Paradox Press):
  - "Warning! Cigarette Companies May be Hazardous to Your Health!" (with Steve Vance, in The Big Book of Vice, 1998)
  - "The Devil's Smelly Brother" (with Jonathan Vankin, in The Big Book of Grimm, 1999)
  - "The Short, Happy Life of Disco" (with Jonathan Vankin, in The Big Book of the 70s, 2000)
- Frank Frazetta Fantasy Illustrated #8: "The Seed" (script and art, anthology, Quantum Cat, 1999)
- Happydale: Devils in the Desert #1–2 (with Andrew Dabb, Vertigo, 1999)
- Heavy Metal (anthology, Metal Mammoth Inc.):
  - "Sacrifice" (script and art, in vol. 24 #4, 2000)
  - "Lift" (script and art, with Kaare Andrews, in vol. 24 #6, 2001)
  - "Lifeblood: Human Contact" (with Michael O'Connell, in Erotic Special #2, 2002)
- Green Lantern: Willworld (with J. M. DeMatteis, graphic novel, DC Comics, 2001)
- The Flash: Time Flies (with John Rozum, one-shot, DC Comics, 2002)
- Vertigo Pop! Tokyo #1–4 (with Jonathan Vankin, Vertigo, 2002)
- Doom Patrol vol. 3 #13–14: "Do Over" (with John Arcudi, DC Comics, 2002–2003)
- Spider-Man Unlimited vol. 3 #8: "Fanboyz" (with Joe Hill, anthology, Marvel, 2005)
- Batman: Legends of the Dark Knight #192–196: "Snow" (with Dan Curtis Johnson and J. H. Williams III, DC Comics, 2005)
- Fantastic Four/Iron Man #1–4: "Big in Japan" (with Zeb Wells, Marvel, 2005–2006)
- Grave Tales #6: "Freddy Wertham Goes to Hell" (with Joe Hill, anthology, Cemetery Dance, 2009)
  - Fisher finished only a couple of pages, and the rest was penciled and inked by Langdon Foss from his layouts.
  - A colorized version of the story was printed in Locke & Key: Welcome to Lovecraft Special Edition (IDW Publishing).

=== Covers only ===
- Busted! vol. 2 #7 (CBLDF, 2000)
- Zendra #5 (Penny-Farthing Press, 2001)
- Transformers: Dark Star hc (Titan Books, 2005)

=== Other work ===
- Myst III: Exile (design for the "hub", J'Nanin and Narayan ages, developed by Presto Studios for Ubisoft, 2001)
- The Authority: Absolute Edition Volume 2 (The Doctor pin-up, published by DC Comics' Wildstorm imprint, 2003)
- Flowering Nose in Slugland (Java-based game written and designed by Fisher in collaboration with Omar Waly at Radical Play, 2004)
- Bank$ – Tomorrow (CD cover, Genius at Work, 2004)
- Squaremeat – Astronomical Coffee Break (CD cover, Exogenic Records, 2005)
- Build Your Own Backpack Alarm (illustrations, written by Shar Levine and Leslie Johnstone, Scholastic, 2006)
