= List of Hal Jordan comics collected editions =

Hal Jordan's Green Lantern comics have been collected into a number of volumes. The following is a list of them.

== List ==
Title	Material collected	ISBN
Green Lantern Archives (color, hardcover)
Green Lantern Archives Vol. 1	Showcase #22–24; Green Lantern vol. 2, #1–5	HC: 1-56389-087-9
Green Lantern Archives Vol. 2	Green Lantern vol. 2, #6–13	HC: 1-56389-566-8
Green Lantern Archives Vol. 3	Green Lantern vol. 2, #14–21	HC: 1-56389-713-X
Green Lantern Archives Vol. 4	Green Lantern vol. 2, #22–29	HC: 1-56389-811-X
Green Lantern Archives Vol. 5	Green Lantern vol. 2, #30–38	HC: 1-4012-0404-X
Green Lantern Archives Vol. 6	Green Lantern vol. 2, #39–47	HC: 1-4012-1189-5
The Green Lantern Omnibus (color, hardcover)
The Green Lantern Omnibus Vol. 1	Showcase #22–24; Green Lantern vol. 2, #1–21	HC: 1-4012-3056-3
The Green Lantern Omnibus Vol. 2	Green Lantern vol. 2, #22–45	HC: 1-4012-3295-7
Green Lantern Chronicles (color, paperback)
Green Lantern Chronicles Vol. 1	Showcase #22–24; Green Lantern vol. 2, #1–3	SC: 1-4012-2163-7
Green Lantern Chronicles Vol. 2	Green Lantern vol. 2, #4–9	SC: 1-4012-2499-7
Green Lantern Chronicles Vol. 3	Green Lantern vol. 2, #10–14; The Flash #143	SC: 1-4012-2915-8
Green Lantern Chronicles Vol. 4	Green Lantern vol. 2, #15–20	SC: 1-4012-3396-1
Showcase Presents: Green Lantern (black and white, paperback)
Showcase Presents: Green Lantern Vol. 1	Showcase #22–24; Green Lantern vol. 2, #1–17	SC: 1-4012-0759-6
Showcase Presents: Green Lantern Vol. 2	Green Lantern vol. 2, #18–37; The Flash #143	SC: 1-4012-1264-6
Showcase Presents: Green Lantern Vol. 3	Green Lantern vol. 2, #39–59	SC: 1-4012-1792-3
Showcase Presents: Green Lantern Vol. 4	Green Lantern vol. 2, #60–75	SC: 1-4012-2278-1
Green Lantern: The Silver Age (color, paperback)
Green Lantern: The Silver Age Vol. 1	Showcase #22–24; Green Lantern vol. 2, #1–9	SC: 1-4012-6348-8
Green Lantern: The Silver Age Vol. 2	Green Lantern vol. 2, #10–22	SC: 1-4012-7107-3
Green Lantern: The Silver Age Vol. 3	Green Lantern vol. 2, #23–35	SC: 1-4012-7847-7
Green Lantern: The Silver Age Vol. 4	Green Lantern vol. 2, #36–48	SC: 1-4012-9435-9
Green Lantern: The Silver Age Omnibus (color, hardcover)
Green Lantern: The Silver Age Omnibus Vol. 1	Showcase #22–24; Green Lantern vol. 2, #1–35	SC: 1-7795-2582-6
Green Lantern: The Silver Age Omnibus Vol. 2	Green Lantern vol. 2, #36–75	SC: 1-7995-0122-1
DC Finest: Green Lantern (color, paperback)
DC Finest: Green Lantern: The Defeat of Green Lantern	Green Lantern vol. 2, #19–39; The Flash vol. 1 #143; The Brave and the Bold vol. 1 #59	SC: 1-7795-2848-5
DC Finest: Green Lantern: Earth's Other Green Lantern	Green Lantern vol. 2, #40–61; The Flash vol. 1 #168; The Brave and the Bold vol. 1 #69	SC: 1-7995-0326-7
DC Finest: Green Lantern: Hard Traveling Heroes	Green Lantern vol. 2, #76–82; The Flash vol. 1 #191; World's Finest vol. 1 #201	SC: 1-7995-1027-1
Green Lantern/Green Arrow
Green Lantern/Green Arrow Vol. 1	Green Lantern vol. 2, #76–82	SC: 1-4012-0224-1
Green Lantern/Green Arrow Vol. 2	Green Lantern vol. 2, #83–87, 89; back-ups from Flash vol. 2, #217–219	SC: 1-4012-0230-6
Miscellaneous
Cosmic Odyssey	Cosmic Odyssey #1–4 (miniseries)	SC: 1-56389-051-8
Green Lantern: The Road Back	Green Lantern vol. 3, #1–8	SC: 1-56389-045-3
Green Lantern: Emerald Dawn	Green Lantern: Emerald Dawn #1–6 (miniseries)	SC: 1-4352-4580-6
Green Lantern: Emerald Dawn II	Green Lantern: Emerald Dawn II #1–6 (miniseries)	SC: 1-4012-0016-8
Green Lantern: Ganthet's Tale	Graphic Novel	SC: 1-56389-026-7
Superman: The Return of Superman	Green Lantern vol. 3, #46; Action Comics #687–691; The Adventures of Superman #500–505; Superman vol. 2, #78–82; Superman: The Man of Steel #22–26	SC: 1-56389-149-2
Green Lantern: Emerald Twilight	Green Lantern vol. 3, #48–50	SC: 1-56389-164-6
As Parallax
Zero Hour: Crisis in Time	Showcase '94 #8–9, Zero Hour: Crisis in Time #0–4 (miniseries)	SC: 1-56389-184-0
The Final Night	Final Night Preview, #1–4 (miniseries); Parallax: Emerald Night (one-shot)	SC: 1-56389-419-X
Green Lantern: Emerald Knights	Green Lantern vol. 3, #99–106; Green Arrow #136	SC: 1-56389-475-0
Flashbacks
Flash & Green Lantern: The Brave and the Bold	Flash & Green Lantern: The Brave and the Bold #1–6 (miniseries)	SC: 1-56389-708-3
Green Lantern: Willworld	Graphic Novel	HC: 1-56389-782-2 SC: 1-56389-993-0
As Spectre
Green Lantern: The Power of Ion	Green Lantern vol. 3, #142–150	SC: 1-56389-972-8
Green Lantern: Brother's Keeper	Green Lantern vol. 3, #151–155; Green Lantern Secret Files #3	SC: 1-4012-0078-8
On his return
Green Lantern: Rebirth	Green Lantern: Rebirth #1–6 (miniseries)	HC: 1-4012-0710-3 SC: 1-4012-0465-1
Green Lantern: No Fear	Green Lantern vol. 4, #1–6; Green Lantern Secret Files and Origins #1	HC: 1-4012-0466-X SC: 1-4012-1058-9
Green Lantern Corps: Recharge	Green Lantern Corps: Recharge #1–5 (miniseries)	SC: 1-4012-0962-9
Green Lantern: Revenge of the Green Lanterns	Green Lantern vol. 4, #7–13	HC: 1-4012-1167-4 SC: 1-4012-0960-2
Green Lantern: Wanted: Hal Jordan	Green Lantern vol. 4, #14–17	HC: 1-4012-1339-1 SC: 1-4012-1590-4
Green Lantern Corps: To Be a Lantern	Green Lantern Corps vol. 2, #1–6	SC: 1-4012-1356-1
Green Lantern Corps: The Dark Side of Green	Green Lantern Corps vol. 2, #7–13	SC: 1-4352-5617-4
Sinestro Corps War Vol. 1	Green Lantern vol. 4, #21–23; Green Lantern Corps (vol. 2) #14–15; Green Lantern: Sinestro Corps Special	HC: 1-4012-1650-1 SC: 1-4012-1870-9
Sinestro Corps War Vol. 2	Green Lantern vol. 4, #24–25; Green Lantern Corps vol. 2, #16–19	HC: 1-4012-1800-8 SC: 1-4012-2036-3
Tales of the Sinestro Corps Wars	Green Lantern: Sinestro Corps Special; Tales of the Sinestro Corps: Ion; Tales of the Sinestro Corps: Parallax; Tales of the Sinestro Corps: Cyborg Superman; Tales of the Sinestro Corps: Superman Prime; Green Lantern/Sinestro Corps Secret Files; back-up stories from Green Lantern #18–20	HC: 1-4012-1801-6 SC: 1-4012-2326-5
Green Lantern Corps: Ring Quest	Green Lantern Corps vol. 2, #19–20,23–26	SC: 1-4012-1975-6
Green Lantern: Rage of the Red Lanterns	Green Lantern vol. 4, #26–28, 36–38; Final Crisis: Rage of the Red Lanterns	HC: 1-4012-2301-X
Green Lantern: Secret Origin	Green Lantern vol. 4, #29–35	HC: 1-4012-1990-X
Green Lantern Corps: Sins of the Star Sapphire	Green Lantern Corps vol. 2, #27–32	SC: 1-4012-2273-0
Green Lantern: Agent Orange	Green Lantern vol. 4, #39–42	HC: 1-4012-2421-0
Green Lantern Corps: Emerald Eclipse	Green Lantern Corps vol. 2, #33–38	HC: 1-4012-2528-4
During Blackest Night
Blackest Night	Blackest Night #0–8	HC: 1-4012-2693-0
Blackest Night: Green Lantern	Green Lantern vol. 4, #43–52	HC: 1-4012-2786-4
Blackest Night: Green Lantern Corps	Green Lantern Corps vol. 2, #39–47	HC: 1-4012-2788-0
During Brightest Day
Brightest Day: Vol. 1	Brightest Day #0–7	HC: 1-4012-2966-2
Brightest Day: Vol. 2	Brightest Day #8–16	HC: 1-4012-3083-0
Brightest Day: Vol. 3	Brightest Day #17–24	HC: 1-4012-3216-7
Green Lantern: Brightest Day	Green Lantern vol. 4 #53–62	HC: 1-4012-3181-0
After Brightest Day
War of the Green Lanterns	Green Lantern vol. 4 #63–67, Green Lantern Corps vol. 2 #58–60, and Green Lantern: Emerald Warriors #8–10	HC: 1-4012-3234-5
War of the Green Lanterns: Aftermath	Green Lantern Corps vol. 2 #61-63, Green Lantern: Emerald Warriors #11-13, and War of the Green Lantern: Aftermath #1–2	HC: 1-4012-3343-0
