= Moonshadow (comics) =

1985-1987 Marvel Comics limited series

- Cover art for the first issue of Moonshadow, March 1985.

Publication information
- Publisher: Marvel Comics
- Schedule: Monthly
- Format: Limited series
- Publication date: 1985-1987
- No. of issues: Thirteen

Creative team
- Written by: J. M. DeMatteis
- Artist(s): Jon J. Muth; Kent Williams; George Pratt

Moonshadow is a 1985-1987 limited series written and created by J. M. DeMatteis and illustrated by Jon J. Muth and Kent Williams as well as George Pratt. It was later released as a trade paperback entitled The Compleat Moonshadow. The comic was inspired by the Cat Stevens song "Moonshadow". It takes the form of a coming-of-age story with elements of satire.

== Plot ==
The story takes the form of an eclectic and quirky fairy tale with satirical elements and dealing with philosophical concerns. It is told via the framing device of Moonshadow, now 120, looking back on his earlier life. The action concerns the events leading up to the "awakening" of Moonshadow, the child of a hippy mother and an enigmatic alien father. The alien, who resembles a glowing orb of light bearing a stylized human face, abducted Moonshadow's mother from Earth in 1968 along with her black pet cat, Frodo. When the idealistic and naive Moonshadow is orphaned at approximately age 15, he becomes friends with a venal and opportunistic furry humanoid named Ira. Moonshadow, Ira and Frodo the cat set out to find a life for themselves in the stars.

Moonshadow loses his innocence, but eventually makes peace with the world and reconciles himself to the actions of his seemingly capricious alien father.

== Background and creation ==
The general concept of Moonshadow dates back to roughly a decade before the series's publication, and was reworked by J. M. DeMatteis numerous times over the years. For example, in the original concept for the series, the protagonist had superpowers. Another early concept for the series, then under the title Stardust, was submitted to Marvel Comics editor-in-chief Jim Shooter around the turn of the decade.

Encouraged by the publication of experimental series such as Camelot 3000 and the Epic Comics lineup, in 1983 DeMatteis again pursued publication for Moonshadow. While talking with his friend Karen Berger, he mentioned his idea for the series, and an enthusiastic Berger offered to have DC Comics publish it. Having already been considering going over to DC, DeMatteis was initially inclined to accept, but when he discussed the upcoming expiration of his contract with Marvel, Shooter offered to publish both Moonshadow and the Greenberg the Vampire graphic novel, another DeMatteis pet project that he had previously rejected. DeMatteis recalled:

Jim said, "Okay. You've been here long enough. You've paid your dues. You deserve to get a chance to do some things that you want to do". And I respect him for letting me do it. I wasn't one of Marvel's top-selling writers. Jim could easily have said: "Fine. Go do it for DC".

== Publication history ==
Moonshadow was originally a twelve-issue maxi-series published by Marvel Comics under its Epic imprint from 1985 to 1987. It was the first American comic book whose art was done entirely by painting. The series was subsequently reprinted as a single volume in 1989. Also in 1989, a limited edition hardcover was also released by Graphitti Designs. Only 1200 copies of this edition were published, each individually numbered and signed by DeMatteis and Muth.

From 1994 to 1995, DC Comics published the individual issues as one of the first limited series of its Vertigo imprint, followed in 1997 by Farewell, Moonshadow, a one-issue sequel set years later, which acts as a coda to the series. The Compleat Moonshadow reprinted all of this material in 1998 with some textual revisions.

In 2019, Dark Horse Comics reprinted The Compleat Moonshadow in a single hardcover volume, with a new introduction by DeMatteis, behind-the-scenes material, and all the covers of the Epic and Vertigo series. In 2025, Dark Horse reprinted Moonshadow: The Definitive Edition—Expanded, with a new painted cover and afterword by Muth, a new essay by DeMatteis, and an expanded bonus section featuring script pages and sketches.
