= Jon J Muth =

American writer and illustrator

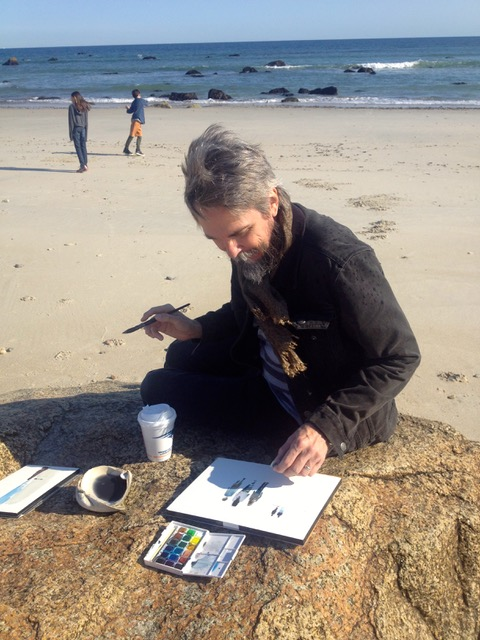
- Muth in 2018
- Born: July 28, 1960 (age 65); Cincinnati, Ohio, United States
- Occupations: Artist, illustrator
- Awards: Eisner Award, 1995; Society of Illustrators Gold Medal, 1999; Caldecott Honor, 2006

Jon J Muth (/mjuːθ/; born July 28, 1960) is an American writer and illustrator of children's books as well as graphic novels and comic books.

== Career ==
Muth studied stone sculpture and shodō (書道; 'brush calligraphy') in Japan; and studied painting, printmaking, and drawing in England, Austria, and Germany.

In the comics industry, his works include J. M. DeMatteis' graphic novel Moonshadow, Grant Morrison's The Mystery Play, Neil Gaiman's The Sandman: The Wake with Michael Zulli and Charles Vess, Mike Carey's Lucifer: Nirvana and Swamp Thing: Roots. He worked with writers Walt and Louise Simonson and co-artist Kent Williams on Havok and Wolverine: Meltdown in 1988. That series was a result of Williams and Muth's desire to work on a project together. Muth received an Eisner Award in the category "Best Painter/Multimedia Artist (Interior Art)" in 1995 for his work on The Mystery Play.

In addition, Muth has had an award-winning career as a children's book writer and illustrator. He explained that "a sense of joy is what moved me from comics to picture books. My work in children's books grew out of a desire to explore what I was feeling as a new father". He received a Gold Medal from the Society of Illustrators in 1999 for his illustrations in Come On, Rain! by Karen Hesse. Muth created a version of the stone soup fable set in China and illustrated cards for the Magic: The Gathering collectible card game. In 2005, Muth collaborated with author Caroline Kennedy on A Family of Poems: My Favorite Poetry for Children.

== Bibliography ==
Muth has authored and illustrated a number of books for a variety of publishing houses.

=== Art collections ===
- Vanitas: Paintings, Drawings and Ideas Tundra Publishing, 1991
- Pictures Places Stone Allen Spiegel Fine Arts, 1993
- Koan: Paintings by Jon J Muth & Kent Williams with Kent Williams, Allen Spiegel Fine Arts, November 2001, ISBN 978-0964206939

=== Children's books authored and illustrated ===
- The Three Questions, Scholastic Press, April 2002, ISBN 978-0439199964
- Stone Soup, Scholastic Press, March 2003, ISBN 978-0439339094
- Zen Shorts, Scholastic Press, March 2005, ISBN 978-0439339117
- Zen Ties, Scholastic Press, February 2008, ISBN 978-0439634250
- Zen Ghosts, Scholastic Press, September 2010, ISBN 978-0439634304
- Hi, Koo!, Scholastic Press, February 2014, ISBN 978-0545166683
- Zen Socks, Scholastic Press, September 2015, ISBN 978-0545166690
- Mama Lion Wins the Race, Scholastic Press, August 2017, ISBN 978-0545852821
- Zen Happiness, Scholastic Press, January 2019, ISBN 978-1338346022
- Addy's Cup of Sugar, October 20, 2020 ISBN 978-0439634281

Theater adaptation

- Zen Shorts, adapted for stage by Rogue Artists Ensemble, 2015

T.V. adaptations

- Stillwater, Apple TV+, 2020–present

=== Children's books illustrated ===
- Come On, Rain with author Karen Hesse, Scholastic Press, March 1999, ISBN 978-0590331258
- Putnam and Pennyroyal with author Patrick Jennings, Scholastic Press, November 1999, ISBN 978-0439079655
- Gershon's Monster: A Story for the Jewish New Year with author Eric A. Kimmel, Scholastic Press, September 2000, ISBN 978-0439108393
- Why I Will Never Ever Ever Ever Have Enough Time to Read This Book with author Remy Charlip, Tricycle Press, September 2000, ISBN 978-1582460185
- Our Gracie Aunt with author Jacqueline Woodson, Jump At The Sun, April 2002, ISBN 978-0786806201
- Old Turtle and the Broken Truth with author Douglas Wood, Scholastic Press, October 2003, ISBN 978-0439321099
- No Dogs Allowed! with author Sonia Manzano, Atheneum Books, April 2004, ISBN 978-0689830884
- A Family of Poems: My Favorite Poetry for Children with author Caroline Kennedy, Hyperion Books, September 2005, ISBN 978-0786851119
- I Will Hold You 'till You Sleep with author Linda Zuckerman, Scholastic Press, October 2006, ISBN 978-0439434201
- Mr. George Baker with author Amy Hest, Walker Books, June 2007, ISBN 978-0763633080
- A Family Christmas with selection by Caroline Kennedy, Hachette Books; First edition, October 2007, ISBN 9781401322274
- Stonecutter with author John Kuramoto, Feiwel & Friends, April 2009, ISBN 978-0-312-55456-9
- The Christmas Magic with author Lauren Thompson, Scholastic Press, September 2009, ISBN 978-0439774970
- City Dog, Country Frog with author Mo Willems, Hyperion Books, June 2010, ISBN 978-1423103004
- Poems to Learn by Heart with author Caroline Kennedy, Disney-Hyperion; First edition, March 2013, ISBN 1423108051

=== Comics/graphic novels ===
- Epic Illustrated #12, 19–21, 24, 31, Marvel Comics, June 1982 – August 1985
- Moonshadow #1–12 with author J. M. DeMatteis, Marvel Comics/Epic Comics, March 1985 – February 1987, collected as The Compleat Moonshadow which also includes Farewell Moonshadow, DC Comics, February 1998, ISBN 978-1563893438
- Dracula: A Symphony in Moonlight and Nightmares, Marvel Comics, 1986, ISBN 978-0871351715; NBM Publishing, January 1993 ISBN 978-1561630592
- New Mutants #62 with author Louise Simonson, Marvel Comics, April 1988
- Havok and Wolverine: Meltdown #1–4 with authors Walt Simonson, Louise Simonson and artist Kent Williams, Marvel Comics/Epic Comics, 1988–1989, collected edition March 2003, ISBN 978-0785110484
- M #1–4 based on the screenplay by Fritz Lang, Eclipse Comics, 1990–1992, collected edition Abrams Books, April 2008, ISBN 978-0810995222
- Ray Bradbury Comics #5 comics adaptation of Bradbury's story "The April Witch", Topps Comics, October 1993
- The Mystery Play with author Grant Morrison, DC Comics, January 1994, ISBN 978-1563891083
- The Mythology of an Abandoned City Tundra Publishing, June 1994, ISBN 978-1879450561
- Imaginary Magnitude with author John Kuramoto, Kodansha, April 1996, ISBN 978-4063300123
- The Sandman: The Wake contributed the story "Exiles" with author Neil Gaiman, DC Comics, December 1996, ISBN 978-1852867737
- Swamp Thing: Roots DC Comics, March 1998, 978-1563893773
- Silver Surfer #139–145 (#143–144 covers only) with author J. M. DeMatteis, Marvel Comics, 1998
- 9-11: Artists Respond, Volume One "Prayer" two-page story, Dark Horse Comics, January 2002 ISBN 978-0613508544
- Global Frequency: Planet Ablaze contributed the story "Big Skys" with author Warren Ellis, DC Comics, February 2004, ISBN 978-1401202743
- Lucifer, Book 11: Evensong contributed the story "Nirvana" with author Mike Carey, DC Comics, January 2007, ISBN 978-1401212001
- The Seventh Voyage: Star Diaries Author: Stanislaw Lem, Illustrator: Jon J Muth, Translator: Michael Kandel, Graphix, October 2019, ISBN 9780545004626

== Awards ==
=== Books ===
Award	Year	Category	Media	Result	Ref.
Eisner Awards	2020	Best Adaptation from Another Medium	The Seventh Voyage	Nominated	
Eisner Awards	2020	Best Archival Collection/Project-Comic Books	Moonshadow: The Definitive Edition	Nominated	
The Broken Frontier Awards	2019	Best Collection of Classical Material	Moonshadow: The Definitive Edition		
Beehive Book Awards	2016	Poetry Division	Hi, Koo!: A Year of Seasons	Won	
A Junior Library Guild Selection	2015		Zen Socks	Won	
A Junior Library Guild Selection	2010		City Dog, Country Frog	Won	
Ohioana Awards	2010	The Hamilton County Committee Program; In Honor of Hamilton County Authors and Composers	A Christmas Magic		
Ohioana Awards	2010	The Hamilton County Committee Program; In Honor of Hamilton County Authors and Composers	Stonecutter		
The Children's Choice Book Awards	2009	Illustrator of the Year	Zen Ties	Won	
The Francis and Wesley Bock Book Awards	2009	Newmann University	Zen Ties	Won	
The Children's Choice Book Awards	2009	Children's Book Council	Zen Ties	Won	
The Children's Picture Book Awards	2008	The New Atlantic Independent Booksellers Association	Zen Ties	Won	
Caldecott Honor	2006	The Association for Library Service to Children	Zen Shorts	Won	
Book Sense Book of the Year	2006	American Booksellers Association	Zen Shorts	Won	
Children's Picture Book Awards	2005	The New Atlantic Independent Booksellers Association	Zen Shorts	Won	
Children's Media Honor	2002	Achievement in Picture Books	The Three Questions	Won	
The National Children's Publication Awards	2002	HONORS Award	The Three Questions	Won	
The Sydney Taylor Book Awards	2000	The Association of Jewish Libraries	Gershon's Monster: A Story for the Jewish New Year	Won	
Gold Medal	1999	The Society of Illustrators Awards	Come On, Rain	Won	
The Will Eisner Comics Industry Awards	1995	Best Painter	The Mystery Play	Won	
The Will Eisner Comics Industry Awards	1993	Best Graphic Album	The Mythology of an Abandoned City	Nominated	

=== Other ===
Award	Year	Category	Media	Result	Ref.
Annie Awards	2021	Best TV/Media-Preschool	Stillwater (Apple TV+ Television Series)	Nominated	
Emmy Awards	2021	Outstanding Preschool Children's Animated Series Outstanding Writing Team Outstanding Directing Team	Stillwater (Apple TV+ Television Series)	Nominated	
The Peabody Awards	2021	Children's and Youth	Stillwater (Apple TV+ Television Series)	Won	
Annie Awards	2022	Best TV/Media-Preschool	Stillwater (Apple TV+ Television Series)	Nominated	
Children's and Family Emmy Awards	2022	Outstanding Directing Team for Preschool Animated Program Outstanding Editing	Stillwater (Apple TV+ Television Series)	Won	
