= Zen Shorts =

Book by Jon J. Muth

- Author: Jon J. Muth
- Cover artist: Muth
- Language: English
- Published: 2005 (Scholastic Press)
- Publication place: United States
- Pages: 40
- ISBN: 978-0-439-33911-7
- OCLC: 53084041
- Dewey Decimal: [E] 22
- LC Class: PZ7.M97274 Ze 2005
- Followed by: Zen Ties

Zen Shorts is a 2005 children's picture book by Jon J. Muth. The picture book can be divided into three sections based on the three stories told in the book. The illustrations in the book are created using the watercolor and ink drawing techniques, which were created by Jon J. Muth himself. The book was followed by Zen Ties in 2008.

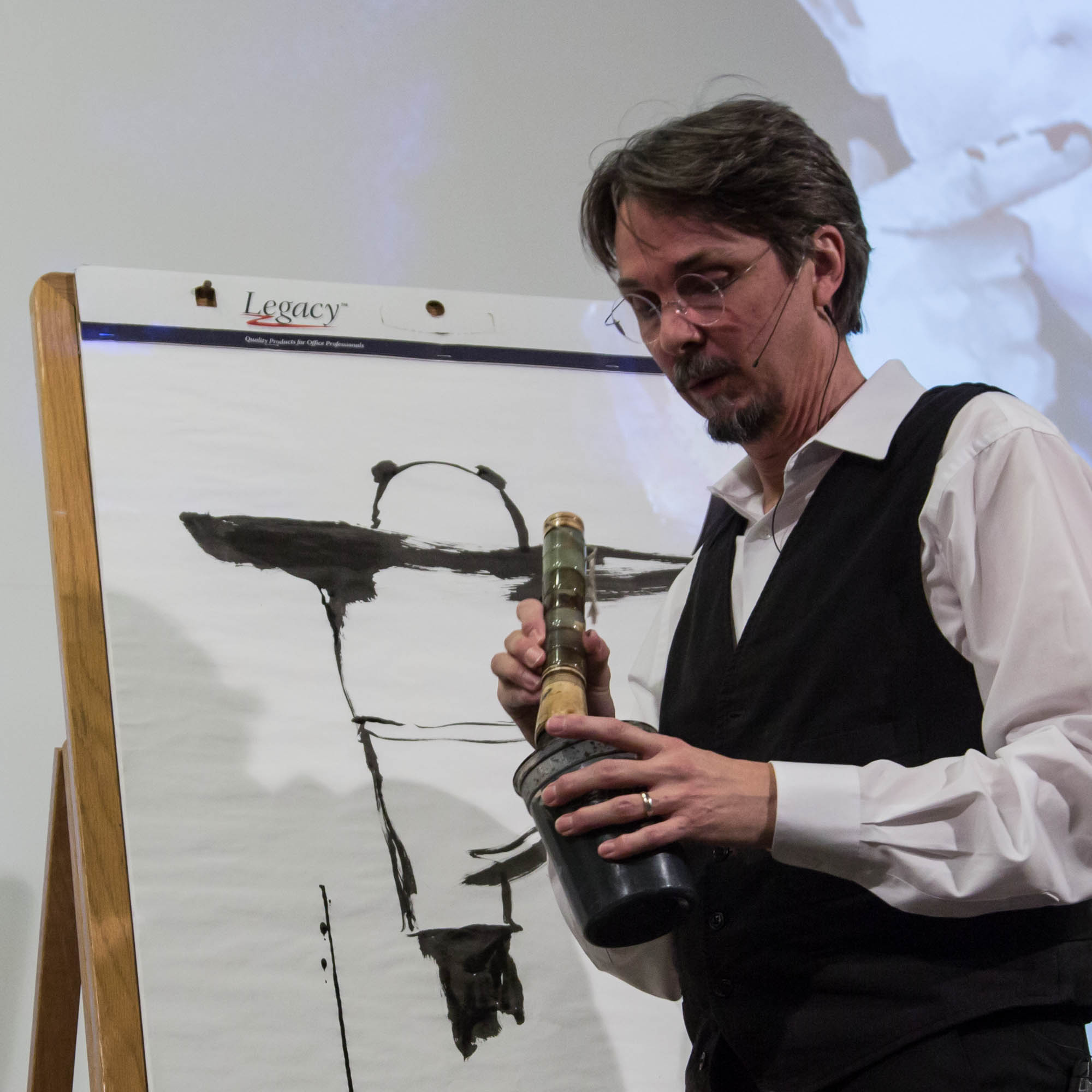
Jon J. Muth demonstrating his ink drawing technique while drawing a Panda (similar to that of Stillwater on the inside cover of Zen Shorts).

An animated series adaptation Stillwater was released on Apple TV+ on December 4, 2020.

== Plot ==
Three children, Karl, Michael and Addy, encounter a giant panda named Stillwater. The panda carries a red umbrella and speaks in a "slight panda accent". For the next three days, the three kids visit Stillwater. The panda rewards each with instructive anecdotes. To Michael he tells a story about good and bad boundaries, he tells Addy a story about the value of material goods, and Karl a story on how to hold frustration. Two of them are from Zen Buddhist literature and the other story is from Taoism. The stories illustrate the importance of meditation, and encourage readers to think about things that may be hard to imagine. They have strong themes about open-mindedness, compassion, and not getting too upset about things.

The name of the first story "Uncle Ry and the Moon" is a reference to the Zen hermit Ryokan Taigu. In it, Uncle Ry lives in a lonely place, and finds a thief in his house. Taking pity on the poverty of the thief, Ry gives him his own robe, his only possession.

The next story is the Taoist story of "The Farmer's Luck", where what first appears to be bad luck turns out to be good luck, and vice versa.

The final story "A Heavy Load" is a version of a Zen story of two monks who meet a woman unable to cross some water. The older monk carries the woman across, but she fails to thank him. The young monk broods on the incident, but the older one says, "I set the woman down hours ago. Why are you still carrying her?"

== Reception ==
Bruno Navasky, of The New York Times, reviewed the book saying: "Muth attributes the third to a Taoist tradition, but for me it calls to mind most vividly the popular picture book Fortunately by Remy Charlip, with whom Muth has also worked. In any case, the cultural blurrings won't reduce the pleasure with which this book is received, and most children would surely vouchsafe Jon Muth the pleasure of a one-handed round of applause for his elegant tale". A Kirkus Reviews review says: "The Buddha lurks in the details here: Every word and image comes to make as perfect a picture book as can be". A Publishers Weekly review says that "readers will fall easily into the rhythm of visits to Stillwater and his storytelling sessions, and many more will fall in love with the panda, whose shape and size offer the children many opportunities for cuddling".

Zen Shorts spent 41 weeks on the New York Times bestseller list.

== Adaptations ==
In 2012, Zen Shorts was adapted into a stage play of the same name by Elizabeth Wong. It was directed by Sean Cawelti and John Norbori, and produced by the Rogue Artists Ensemble.

An animated children's television adaptation titled Stillwater, produced by Gaumont and Scholastic Entertainment for Apple TV+, was released on December 4, 2020.

== Awards ==
- 2006 Book Sense Book of the Year Awards
- Caldecott Honor
