= Frank Chiaramonte =

American comic book artist (1942–1983)

- Frank Chiaramonte
- Born: Francisco Chiaramonte; June 5, 1942 Cuba
- Died: January 1983 (aged 40)
- Areas: Inker, penciller
- Pseudonym: Frank Monte
- Notable works: Superman, Ghost Rider, Man-Thing, Werewolf by Night

Francisco Chiaramonte (June 5, 1942 – January 28, 1983) was an American comic book artist best known as an inker for DC Comics and Marvel Comics from 1972 to 1982.

== Biography ==
Born in Cuba, Frank Chiaramonte emigrated to the United States in 1967. Some of his earliest comics-related work in the U.S. was as an inker under artist-packager Will Eisner and penciler Mike Ploog on the military instructional publication PS, The Preventive Maintenance Monthly. As fellow PS artist Murphy Anderson recalled, "Frank had come to work for Will about the same time I did, maybe a month or two later, and was just fresh from Cuba. ... [H]is father was Sicilian, but his mother was Spanish, or Cuban. Frank considered himself as Italian as he did Cuban. ... Frank worked with me and did most of the tech art."

When Ploog moved on and began finding freelance work at Marvel Comics, Chiaramonte collaborated with him as inker on several of Ploog's earliest stories, including in Werewolf by Night #1-3 (Sept. 1972 - Jan. 1973) and Marvel Spotlight #7 (Dec. 1972), featuring Ghost Rider. He also inked several Ploog stories in the swamp-monster series Man-Thing in 1974, and Ploog stories in the black-and-white comics magazine Planet of the Apes in 1974 and 1975.

With other pencilers, he inked many stories starring the martial artist superhero Iron Fist, as well as Amazing Adventures #18 (May 1973), the debut of the feature "Killraven, Warrior of the Worlds", inking Neal Adams and Howard Chaykin.

Chiaramonte moved to DC Comics to freelance in 1977, beginning with Action Comics #475 (Sept. 1977), in which he inked Kurt Schaffenberger on the lead Superman story, and Win Mortimer on the Lori Lemaris backup. He became Curt Swan's regular inker on the sister series Superman from 1978 through mid-1982. In addition to other Superman work in Action Comics, The Superman Family, World of Krypton and related titles, he also inked numerous stories for The Flash, Detective Comics, The Legion of Super-Heroes and many other series. His last known work was inking Schaffenberger on the 15-page Superboy story "Beware the Yellow Peri" in The New Adventures of Superboy #34 (Oct. 1982).
