= Zen Ties =

Children's book by Jon J. Muth

- Front cover, designed by Jon J. Muth
- Author: Jon J. Muth
- Illustrator: Jon J. Muth
- Cover artist: Muth
- Language: English
- Publisher: Scholastic Press
- Publication date: February 1, 2008
- Publication place: United States
- Pages: 40
- ISBN: 978-0-439-63425-0
- Preceded by: Zen Shorts
- Followed by: Zen Ghosts

Zen Ties is a 2008 children's picture book by Jon J. Muth. The book is a follow-up to Zen Shorts (2005), and a third book, Zen Ghosts, was released in September 2010.

== Plot ==
Stillwater, a panda, and his three-human friends, Karl, Addy and Michael are back in a new adventure. This time, Michael is faced with the daunting challenge of an upcoming spelling bee. The story also introduces Miss Whitaker, an elderly neighbor whose cantankerous nature frightens the children. Stillwater uses his quiet wisdom and insight to see past her bad temper to the lonely woman within. Stillwater also receives a visit from his young nephew Koo, who speaks in Haiku.
