= Weirdworld =

Fantasy comic book series

- Cover to Marvel Premiere #38 (October 1977), art by Dave Cockrum and Rudy Nebres

Publication information
- Publisher: Marvel Comics

Creative team
- Created by: Doug Moench; Mike Ploog

Weirdworld was a fantasy series created by Doug Moench and Mike Ploog for American company Marvel Comics, set in a dimension of magic. A comic book series titled Weirdworld debuted in 2015 as a tie-in to the Secret Wars storyline, followed by a six-issue series as a part of the All-New, All-Different Marvel branding.

== Publication history ==
=== 1970s and 1980s appearances ===
Originally intended to be published in the discontinued Monsters Unleashed, the first "Weirdworld" story eventually appeared in the one and only issue of the black-and-white magazine Marvel Super Action. It then was featured in the color comic book Marvel Premiere #38 (October 1977). In late 1977 or early 1978, co-creator Ploog left Marvel in a contract dispute while in the midst of drawing a 60-page "Weirdworld" story, written by Moench, that the company had planned to publish as one of its Marvel Comics Super Special series of one-shots. Ploog recalled in 1998 that he had "a disagreement with [editor-in-chief] Jim Shooter. I had moved to a farm in Minnesota, and agreed to do a hand-colored 'Weirdworld' story. Marvel backed out of the deal after I had started. I can't remember the details, but it doesn't matter. I think I was ready to move on. Marvel and I were both changing". Rick Marschall, the story's editor, said in 1978 that Ploog had been given four months to complete the art, and when it became evident that the deadline would not be met, arranged to publish the story in two 30-page installments, giving Ploog two more months. Ploog sent Marvel photocopies of the first 31 pages, and was paid for them. During this time, Marvel had given work-for-hire contracts to its freelancers, many of whom, including Ploog, refused to sign, resulting in cessation of work for Marvel. Ploog "took himself off the project", said Marschall, and retained his original artwork. Moench's script was eventually published as a 106-page story illustrated by penciler John Buscema, inker Rudy Nebres, and airbrush colorist Peter Ledger as the three-part "Warriors of the Shadow Realm" in Marvel Super Special #11–13 (Spring–Fall 1979). Additional Weirdworld stories were published in several issues of Epic Illustrated in 1981 and 1982.

Ploog's unused 1978 pages were reworked into the first part of a "Weirdworld" trilogy, in Marvel Fanfare #24 (January 1986), with Pat Broderick penciling the two subsequent issues.

==== Characters ====
The protagonists were the Elves Tyndall and Velanna, both from the floating ring-shaped island of Klarn, and an irascible Dwarf dubbed Mud-Butt because he tended to land on his backside in a quarrel.

=== Weirdworld (2015) ===
As part of the 2015 Secret Wars storyline, a miniseries titled Weirdworld starring Arkon was released in June which featured other characters like Morgan le Fay of Earth-15238, Skull the Slayer, a variation of Jennifer Kale from Earth-11234 that is the Queen of Weirdworld's Man-Things, and characters from The Saga of Crystar. Weirdworld is featured on the map of the storyline's version of Battleworld as a floating island composed of fragments from many alternate reality magical realms like Polemachus, Crystalium, Klarn, and the original Weirdworld. By the end of the miniseries, Weirdworld manifested on Earth-616 in the Bermuda Triangle.

=== Weirdworld (vol. 2) ===
Weirdworld remained as part of the Marvel Universe post-Secret Wars and became the setting of a new volume of Weirdworld.

Rebecca "Becca" Rodriguez was an American teenager who was flying from the United States of America to Mexico on board Flight 789. While traveling through the Bermuda Triangle, the Boeing 747 crashed into Weirdworld where its surviving occupants were rescued by Arkon. Rebecca encountered the Ogeode who stated that he caused the plane to crash with the artefact called the Wuxian Seed. Ogeode was then killed by Goleta the Wizardslayer and the Wuxian Seed falling into Rebecca's possession. Alone in Weirdworld, Rebecca agreed to become Goleta's squire and the two set off together, unknowingly being tracked by the Catbeast that had emerged from Ogeode's corpse. While traveling around Weirdworld, Rebecca and Goleta are startled by the Catbeast's sudden appearance and drove off the road. Upon reaching safety, the Catbeast caught up to them and revealed himself to be Ogeode. This forces Becca to step between him and Goleta's axe lest he be killed again before he could send her back to Earth. Ogeode's Catbeast form then explains to get Rebecca back to Earth, they need to travel across the Fang Mountains to retrieve a spare wizard body. Rebecca met Eta the Watcher who urged her not to go to the Fang Mountains or else it would bring a full scale war to all of Weirdworld.

=== Other appearances ===
Weirdworld is also the setting for a new series starring Dane Whitman, the Black Knight. Black Knight fled to Weirdworld after using the Ebony Blade to kill Carnivore. Upon arriving on Weirdworld, he killed King Zaltin Tar to establish New Avalon and built an army with the help of Shield and Spear. Black Knight has the army built in anticipation of the arrival of the Avengers Unity Division who are seeking to bring him to justice.

Spider-Man and Deadpool hid from Itsy Bitsy in Weirdworld in the storyline of the same name, where they helped the Bogswaggers escape from the Witch Queen le Fay and reclaim their land of Bathsalthia from the Kingslayers, as well as fighting the creature Sl'Ur'Boroth, whose arrival was heralded by Moloids.

After Sam Alexander and Nadia van Dyne were abducted by the Man-Thing of Earth-11234, the rest of the Champions followed them to Weirdworld. Upon arrival, they were scattered through Weirdworld with false memories and identities. For instance, Amadeus Cho became an orc known as Brawnhammer, Ironheart became Lady Ironheart, Ms. Marvel became Mystic Marvel, Miles Morales became a rogue named Shadow-Spider, and Snowguard became Snowgore. Only Ironheart remembered the truth, accompanying Miles Morales. The Master of the World pursued them there, and after finding and adopting the amnesiac Nadia and Sam conquered much of Weirdworld with his technology. Riri led an underground resistance movement with Snowguard and Ms. Marvel, and over threw the Master. In the process, the Champions regained their true identities, and left with the Master.

Roxxon was revealed to have made a portal to Weirdworld in order to harness its limitless energy, only for Weirdworld's monsters to travel to Earth wanting to kill every human. When Weapon H, Blake, Man-Thing, Titania, Korg, and a disguised Black Widow travel to Weirdworld on Dario Agger's behalf, he finds that Roxxon had managed to capture Morgan le Fay in order to harness her power source. Thanks to a spell, Morgan le Fay takes control of Weapon H and reclaims control over the Skrullduggers with her magic as she is the only one who can control the Skrullduggers. It was revealed that Morgan le Fay is considered to be a queen to a displaced alien race called the Inaku. The group was able to escape through the portal back to Roxxon.

Emily Bright, a teenage sorcerer at Stephen Strange's school for young magic users, the "Strange Academy". While the students were playing a game of "inter-dimensional door tag" Emily would find herself temporarily in Weirdworld. Here she met the cat-beast Ogeode who would offer the lost student a way home. It's unclear how he survived after apparently dying at the hands of Morgan Le Fey, or if he simply faked his death. Still unaware of the cat-beast true identity, Emily would provide the former wizard Ogeode, a way off Weirdworld to the Strange Academy. The former wizard of Weirdworld now known as "catbeast", would eventually befriend Emily Bright as well as becoming her loyal pet & familiar. It remains to be seen if Ogeode has more sinister intentions, or simply wanted escape from Weirdworld.

Following the Death of Doctor Strange, his newfound school "Strange Academy" was temporarily shut down. Two of the Strange's students, the Asgardian twin sons of Enchantress Iric and Alvi were sent home but their mother's past would come back to haunt them. Iric was getting ready to head back to Asgard, but the now free evil wizard of Weirdworld, appeared in his room and kidnapped him. It was revealed Strange had assisted Enchantress in the past but his death broke the spell keeping her son's safe. Taken to Weirdworld, Iric was drained of his magic so he could be used as a battery for Pulsari to make him strong enough to conquer the Crystal Kingdom. In a very weak state, Iric told the wizard that he'd be dead soon and that he'd lose his newfound strength, but Pulsari told him this wasn't an issue, as his mother and brother were coming to rescue him. When the two arrived along with Goleta the Wizard Slayer, Pulsari presented the worn-out barely alive Iric to them. Goleta, unable to pierce Pulsari's skin, managed to destroy the wizard's necklace, stripping him of his power and returning Iric to normal, in the process.

== Collected editions ==
| Title | Material collected | Published date | ISBN |
|---|---|---|---|
| Weirdworld: Warriors of the Shadow Realm | Marvel Premiere #38, Marvel Super Action #1, Marvel Fanfare #24-26, Marvel Super Special #11-13, Epic Illustrated #9, 11-13 | April 2015 | 978-0785162889 |
| Weirdworld: The Dragonmaster of Klarn | Marvel Super Action #1, Epic Illustrated #9, 11-13 | July 2019 | 978-1302918705 |
| Weirdworld Vol. 0: Warzones! | Weirdworld (vol. 1) #1–5 | December 2015 | 978-0785198918 |
| Weirdworld Vol. 1: Where Lost Things Go | Weirdworld (vol. 2) #1–6 | August 2016 | 978-1302900434 |

== In other media ==
Weirdworld appears in a self-titled episode of Avengers Assemble as a domain of Battleworld.
