= The Fountain (comics) =

2005 graphic novel

- Cover to The Fountain

Publication information
- Publisher: Vertigo
- Format: Graphic novel
- Publication date: November 2005

Creative team
- Written by: Darren Aronofsky
- Artist: Kent Williams

Collected editions
- Hardcover: ISBN 1-4012-0059-1
- Softcover: ISBN 1401200583

The Fountain is a graphic novel illustrated by Kent Williams published in 2005 by Vertigo Comics, based on the original script of Darren Aronofsky's film The Fountain.

The graphic novel was a way to salvage something from the film project, whose first production was cancelled. The film project was later resurrected by Warner Bros.

== Plot summary ==
An army of Spanish soldiers is searching for the Tree of Life. Father Avila feels that their long journey is about to serve its purpose when he notices that a symbol on a blade he is carrying matches a symbol drawn in the sky, as well as on the ground. He presumes this must be the location of the Mayan temple that houses the Tree of Life. The soldiers accompanying him are reluctant and feel that his theories will only add to the loss of soldiers they have had.

The soldiers begin their assault on the temple only to be met by the Mayan warriors who are protecting the temple. Father Avila advances up the temple and is met by a Mayan priest who slowly emerges from the temple.

Dr. Thomas Creo is fatigued, sitting at a computer. He is about to perform surgery on a monkey that has a tumor. His colleagues tell him the surgery is canceled and they are going to euthanize the animal. Thomas brings up an ethnobotanical compound from Guatemala that he insists be injected into the animal. He opens his text and points to a tree. Against his colleagues' objections, the monkey is injected with the sap.

The story cuts to the woman from the tree and the seed she carries. She walks in the snow to the grave of "Izzi Creo". She buries the seed in the snow next to her grave.

== Characters ==
16th century

- Captain Tomas Verde
- Father Avila
- Ariel
- Mayan Priest - Lord of Xibalba
- Queen Isabel
- Silecio the Inquisitor
- The Franciscan
- Captain Rivera

Present

- Dr. Tommy Creo
- Izzi
- Antonio
- Dr. Lillian Guzetti
- Dr. Lipper
- Betty
- Donovan (Monkey)
- Tom
- Woman ("Izzi")

== Reception ==
Writing for IGN, Hilary Goldstein called the comic a "must-have", concluding: "Aronofsky has succeeded, at least in one medium, of providing an incredible journey of love and loss across the centuries".

== See also ==
- List of comics based on films
