= Brooklyn Dreams =

- Brooklyn Dreams #1 (1994), art by Glenn Barr

Publication information
- Publisher: DC Comics
- Format: Limited series
- Publication date: 1994-1995
- No. of issues: 4

Creative team
- Created by: J. M. DeMatteis and Glenn Barr

Brooklyn Dreams is an American comic book limited series written by J. M. DeMatteis and illustrated by Glenn Barr. It was published by the DC Comics imprint, Paradox Press in 1994 and later collected into a trade paperback, published by DC under its Vertigo imprint.

It depicts the memories of an adult narrator, Vincent Carl Santini, remembering his childhood and life in Brooklyn, New York.
