= Abadazad =

American comic book series

- Cover to Abadazad #1

Publication information
- Publisher: CrossGen Entertainment, inc.
- Schedule: Monthly
- Publication date: March 2004 - May 2004
- No. of issues: 3

Creative team
- Written by: J. M. DeMatteis
- Penciller: Mike Ploog
- Colorist: Nick Bell

Abadazad is an American comic book written by J. M. DeMatteis and drawn by Mike Ploog, with color by Nick Bell. Published in 2004 by CrossGen to rave reviews, the series halted after three issues when Crossgen went out of business.

After Disney acquired Abadazad, along with the rest of CrossGen's intellectual property, the story was resumed in June 2006 in a hybrid format: a children's book series that combines sequential art segments alternating with prose segments. Originally meant to be a tetralogy, Disney Publishing changed plans to eight Abadazad volumes, of which only three were published.

== Story ==
Abadazad is a magical land that Kate Jameson — a surly, cynical fourteen-year-old child — has only known through a series of famous fantasy novels written a century ago by one Franklin O. Davies. When Kate suddenly finds herself journeying through the real Abadazad in search of her beloved younger brother, Matt — who vanished five years earlier — she discovers that the truth of Abadazad is far stranger, and more amazing, than fiction. She is guided to enter Abadazad by Little Martha, the protagonist of the novels which she had read, and is given cause to confront the villain known as Lanky Man, to whom is ascribed the disappearance of Matt.

In the original CrossGen comic book, the fictitious author's name had been Franklin O. Barrie (a portmanteau of L. Frank Baum, O. Henry, and J. M. Barrie).

== Book series ==
1. Abadazad: The Road to Inconceivable (June 2006)
2. Abadazad: The Dream Thief (June 2006)
3. Abadazad: The Puppet, the Professor, and the Prophet (July 2007, UK only)
4. Abadazad: Historcery (cancelled)

Book 3, originally scheduled for US publication, appeared only in Great Britain, while Book 4 did not appear at all. The synopsis for Book 4 from Amazon.UK reads as follows: "A groundbreaking mix of fiction and full-colour comic strip that follows a headstrong girl's journey into the bizarre fictional world of Abadazad to rescue her brother. In Historcery, Kate has finally gathered the group of friends she hopes will help her to rescue her brother Matt from the evil Lanky Man: the walking candle Master Wix, Professor Headstrong, the puppet Mary Annette and Mr Glum".

Although he and artist Mike Ploog originally signed up for eight volumes (with hopes for twelve, depending on sales), J. M. DeMatteis said the Abadazad book series ended after three books, and the third book would not be released in the United States. DeMatteis credits the Abadazad experience as inspiring his 2010 prose children's fantasy novel Imaginalis.
