= Blood: A Tale =

- Blood: A Tale #1, art by Kent Williams.

Publication information
- Publisher: Epic Comics; Vertigo (reprint)
- Format: Limited series
- Publication date: 1987
- No. of issues: 4

Creative team
- Written by: J.M. DeMatteis
- Artist(s): Kent Williams

Collected editions
- Blood: A Tale: ISBN 1-4012-0263-2

Blood: A Tale is a four-issue comic book limited series first published by American company Marvel Comics under its Epic imprint in 1987 and later re-released by DC under its Vertigo imprint in 1996. The series was written by J. M. DeMatteis and illustrated by Kent Williams.

The book, mostly illustrated by watercolors, goes back and forth between two plots. One story features an extremely ancient king who is visited by an unusual spirit. As he slowly dies, the spirit tells him many tales.

The other story, the main one, focuses on a man's life. He was found by two women, floating in a river. The story follows him as he grows up and leaves to establish his own life.

== Collected editions ==
- Blood: A Tale softcover (ISBN 1-4012-0263-2)
