= Stillwater (TV series) =

American animated children's television series

- Promotional poster
- Genre: Children's animation
- Based on: Zen Shorts by Jon J. Muth
- Developed by: Rob Hoegee
- Voices of: James Sie; Judah Mackey; Eva Ariel Binder; Tucker Chandler
- Ending theme: "Never Ending Dream" performed by Kishi Bashi
- Composers: Kishi Bashi; Toby Chu
- Countries of origin: United States; France
- Original language: English
- No. of seasons: 5
- No. of episodes: 40

Production
- Executive producers: Sidonie Dumas; Christophe Riandee; Terry Kalagian; Nicolas Atlan; Iole Lucchese; Caitlin Friedman; Jef Kaminsky; Rob Hoegee; Jun Falkenstein (season 3)
- Producers: Cary Silver; Alex Soto (seasons 1–2)
- Editors: Jack Paulson; Jill Calhoun (seasons 1–2); Robert Anich (season 3)
- Running time: 23–24 minutes
- Production companies: Scholastic Entertainment; Gaumont Animation

Original release
- Network: Apple TV+
- Release: December 4, 2020 - August 1, 2025
- Network: Apple TV
- Release: August 21, 2026

Stillwater is an animated children's television series based on the Zen book series by Jon J Muth. The series premiered on December 4, 2020 on Apple TV+. The second season premiered on March 18, 2022. The third season was released on May 19, 2023. The fourth season was released on August 1, 2025. The fifth season was released on August 21, 2026 on Apple TV.

== Synopsis ==
In each episode, siblings Michael, Addy, and Karl have a new adventure each day but get into a certain problem or predicament. They seek the help of the wise and calm neighbor, Stillwater the panda, who tries to teach them a lesson through his stories. The stories turns from the 3d animation to a 2d animation with the characters as animal hybrids who have each experienced a similar problem and learned something important after it. After Stillwater stories, the children take the moral of the story to solve their own problem, and everything usually works out in the end.

== Cast and characters ==
- James Sie as Stillwater, Ren
- Judah Mackey as Karl, Baby Bunny
- Eva Ariel Binder as Addy
- Tucker Chandler as Michael
- Nara Thompson as Koo, Fox Neighbor, Maria
- Sydney Thomas as Maya, Mouse
- Kari Wahlgren as Telly, Ms. Salamander, Mama Bird, Mama Bunny, Raccoon
- Isla Farris as Asha, Pratima
- Fryda Wolff as Cosmo Kora, Wise Wolf, Delia, Nancy, Antonia, Spider Monkey 1
- Fred Tatasciore as Janitor, Mayor, Friend, Jacque, Bear, Rat Guest 2, Father, Lynx Pedestrian #2
- Della Saba as Concert Master, Owl, Polly, Judge, Mistress Mabel
- Jakari Fraser as Raccoon Student, Older Brother, Warthog, Kai
- Rylee Alazraqui as Emma, Hazel, Little Whiskelson, Young Daughter
- Vivienne Rutherford as Rabbit Child, Heather
- Robbie Daymond as Apprentice, Hawk, Gulik, Hare, Spider Monkey 2
- Eric Bauza as Fox Student, Traveler, Dog Neighbor, Octopus, Dario
- Dino Andrade as Attendant, Cal, Frog Craftsman
- Salli Saffioti as Mrs. O'Brien, Yak Neighbor, Surfer Neighbor, Rio, Teacher
- Connor Andrade as Nolan, Joey
- Pierce Kang as Leo
- Kyra Lyn as Molly
- Sawyer Jones as Archie, Julio, Harry Bunny
- Phil LaMarr as Cosmo Kane, Fancy Man, Beekeeper
- Jolene Kim as Artist #1, Master Tanuki
- Andre Robinson as Egret, Kel, Gosling
- Jennifer Hale as Dragon, Villager, Cal, Master Chu, Villager 2
- Stephanie Sheh as Nani, Customer, Hannah
- Sirena Irwin as Fish, Dottie, Odette
- Remi Tuckman as Student, Little Brother
- Toks Olagundoye as Mother Manatee, Empress, Fancy Woman
- Ike Amadi as Jimmy, Ikkyu, Artist #2
- Alastair Duncan as Angus, Goose
- Sunil Malhotra as Llama, Arjun
- Kimberly Brooks as Daisy, Dahlia
- Glynn Turman as Mr. Morgan
- Julie Nathanson as Yvonne, Katya
- Jennie Kwan as Ami, Deer Pedestrian #1, Bear Pedestrian #3
- Antonio Raul Garcia as Lucas, Carlitos
- Carlos Alazraqui as Felipe, Javier, Santiago
- Aleks Le as Contestant 1, Grandson
- Jeanne Sakata as Aunt Sally, Obaachan
- Camden Brooks as Bryan, Lion Cub
- Caleb Jeon as Tommy
- Tom Kenny as Lloyd, Mr. Mudskipper
- Gregory Cruz as Astronomer, Master Builder
- Jane Carr as Grandma, Royal Advisor
- Bahia Watson as Mother Gull, Nina
- Carter Chee as Tommy
- Jeff Bennett as Tortoise, Roadrunner
- Max Mittelman as Joku, Villager 1
- Cassandra Lee Morris as Ying
- Danny Jacobs as Kato
- Kerstin Julia Dietrich as Katya
- Andy Daly as Mr. Whiskerton
- Nazneen Contractor as Queen Tortoise, Hedgehog Guest 1
- Max Mitchell as Narrator
- Pele Liliko'i Howe as Min
- Yuri Lowenthal as Drip, August
- Aidan Bristow as Cart Driver, Robert
- Keith Ferguson as Drop, Stork Neighbor
- Larissa Gallagher as Marina, Mama Roo, Kangaroo Neighbors
- Lauren Tom as Mrs. Wilson
- Dora Dolphin as Maddy
- Juliet Donenfeld as Young Manatee, Gull Sibling
- Izaac Wang as Gull Chick
- Cherise Boothe as Bandleader
- Doug Erholtz as Benjamin, Art Critic
- Mia Akemi Brown as Older Sister
- Jessica Mikayla as Laney
- Thea Saccoliti as Piper
- Kinza Syed Khan as Kiran, Skunk Student
- Malachi Josiah White as Darrell
- Trinity Jo-Li Bliss as Lexi

== Episodes ==
=== Series overview ===
Season	Episodes	Originally released	
Season	Episodes	First released	Last released
1	13	December 4, 2020	December 3, 2021
2	7	March 18, 2022	April 15, 2022
3	10	May 19, 2023	
4	5	August 1, 2025	
5	5	August 21, 2026	

=== Season 1 (2020–21) ===
No. overall	No. in season	Title	Directed by	Written by	Original release date
1	1	"The Impossible Dream" "Stuck in the Rain"	Jun Falkenstein	Rob Hoegee	December 4, 2020
2	2	"Gift of Compassion" "Larger Than Life"	Amber Tornquist Hollinger & Jun Falkenstein	Rob Hoegee & Craig Lewis	December 4, 2020
3	3	"Soaked" "A Perfect Fit"	Jun Falkenstein & Roy Burdine & Amber Tornquist Hollinger	Denise Downer & Craig Lewis	December 4, 2020
4	4	"Downward Dog" "The Sleeping Moon"	Amber Tornquist Hollinger & Jun Falkenstein	Denise Downer & Lisa Kettle	December 4, 2020
5	5	"The Race" "Dressed Up"	Jun Falkenstein & Gary Hartle & Amber Tornquist Hollinger	Sindy McKay & Amy Wolfram	December 4, 2020
6	6	"The Haircut" "Paper Wings"	Jun Falkenstein & Roy Burdine	Lisa Kettle & A.J. & Tanner Marchisello	December 4, 2020
7	7	"Loud Colors" "Tied Up in Knots"	Jun Falkenstein & Amber Tornquist Hollinger	Amy Wolfram & Sindy McKay	August 27, 2021
8	8	"Crossing Over" "Kind of Blue"	Jun Falkenstein & Amber Tornquist Hollinger	Lisa Kettle & Sindy McKay	August 27, 2021
9	9	"Out on a Limb" "Sandcastles"	Jun Falkenstein & Amber Tornquist Hollinger	Len Uhley & Amy Wolfram	August 27, 2021
10	10	"The Unexpected Gift" "Celebration Song"	Jun Falkenstein & Amber Tornquist Hollinger	Amy Wolfram & A.J. & Tanner Marchisello	August 27, 2021
11	11	"The Trade" "Winter Wonder"	Jun Falkenstein & Amber Tornquist Hollinger	A.J. & Tanner Marchisello & Denise Downer	August 27, 2021
12	12	"Ghost Story"	Jun Falkenstein	Rob Hoegee	October 1, 2021
13	13	"The Way Home"	Jun Falkenstein	Rob Hoegee	December 3, 2021

=== Season 2 (2022) ===
No. overall	No. in season	Title	Directed by	Written by	Original release date
14	1	"The Visit"	Amber Tornquist Hollinger Roy Burdine	Rob Hoegee Jessica Welsh	March 18, 2022
14	1	"Showtime"	Amber Tornquist Hollinger Roy Burdine	Rob Hoegee Jessica Welsh	March 18, 2022
15	2	"Karl's Museum" "The Helper"	Amber Tornquist Hollinger Roy Burdine	Matt Wayne Sindy Mckay	March 18, 2022
16	3	"Band Aid" "The Good Morning"	Amber Tornquist Hollinger Roy Burdine	Matt Wayne Jessica Welsh	March 18, 2022
17	4	"Building Big" "Falling Leaves"	Amber Tornquist Hollinger Roy Burdine	Patrick Reiger Jessica Welsh	March 18, 2022
18	5	"Stitch Marks" "Friends Forever"	Amber Tornquist Hollinger Roy Burdine	Sindy McKay Amy Wolfram	March 18, 2022
19	6	"Hide and Seek" "The Trip"	Amber Tornquist Hollinger & Gary Hartle Roy Burdine	Patrick Rieger Rob Hoegee & Jessica Welsh	March 18, 2022
20	7	"One Drop Makes an Ocean"	Gary Hartle	Rob Hoegee	April 15, 2022

=== Season 3 (2023) ===
No. overall	No. in season	Title	Directed by	Written by	Original release date
21	1	"Waiting" "Bake Sale"	Gary Hartle Kuni Tomita	Rob Hoegee Jessica Welsh	May 19, 2023
22	2	"Captain Koo" "Digging Deeper"	Gary Hartle Kuni Tomita	Callie Miller Sindy Mckay	May 19, 2023
23	3	"Tons of Fun" "Apologies"	Gary Hartle Kuni Tomita	Amy Wolfram Len Uhley	May 19, 2023
24	4	"Sounds Like Poetry" "Birdwatching"	Gary Hartle Kuni Tomita	Denise Downer Kris Marvin Hughes	May 19, 2023
25	5	"New Neighbors" "Koo's Gift"	Gary Hartle Kuni Tomita	Jessica Welsh Callie C. Miller	May 19, 2023
26	6	"Friendly Wishes" "Growing Together"	Gary Hartle Kuni Tomita	Patrick Rieger Sindy Mckay	May 19, 2023
27	7	"The Catio" "Campout"	Gary Hartle Jun Falkenstein	Amy Wolfram A.J. & Tanner Marchisello	May 19, 2023
28	8	"Book Club" "Treasure Hunt"	Gary Hartle Kuni Tomita	Callie C. Miller Jessica Welsh	May 19, 2023
29	9	"The Catch" "Missing Out"	Gary Hartle Kuni Tomita	Michael Ryan Kris Marvin Hughes	May 19, 2023
30	10	"I'm Bored" "Art Fair"	Gary Hartle Kuni Tomita	Sindy Mckay Len Uhley	May 19, 2023

=== Season 4 (2025) ===
No. overall	No. in season	Title	Directed by	Written by	Original release date
31	1	"Good, Better, Best" "Raking Leaves"	Jun Falkenstein	Angela M. Sánchez	August 1, 2025
32	2	"Finders Keepers" "Good Advice"	Jun Falkenstein	Callie C. Miller Rusteen Honardoost	August 1, 2025
33	3	"Story Time" "Ring the Bell"	Jun Falkenstein	Jessica Welsh Michael Ryan	August 1, 2025
34	4	"Stage Fright" "The Cast"	Jun Falkenstein	Sam Bissonnette Kris Marvin Hughes	August 1, 2025
35	5	"The Sleepover" "Snow Day"	Jun Falkenstein	Sam Bissonnette Jessica Welsh	August 1, 2025

=== Season 5 (2026) ===
No. overall	No. in season	Title	Directed by	Written by	Original release date
36	1	"Addy's Break" "Puzzled"	Gary Hartle Kuni Tomita	Amy Wolfram Angela M. Sanchez	August 21, 2026
37	2	"Bento Lunch" "Michael's Island"	Gary Hartle Kuni Tomita	Callie C. Miller Rusteen Honardoost	August 21, 2026
38	3	"Can't Sleep" "Missing Mumu"	Gary Hartle Kuni Tomita	Matt Wayne Sindy McKay	August 21, 2026
39	4	"Not Fair" "Big for a Day"	Gary Hartle Kuni Tomita	Amy Wolfram Patrick Rieger	August 21, 2026
40	5	"The New Friend" "Panda Scouts"	Gary Hartle Jun Falkenstein	Jessica Welsh Rob Hoegee	August 21, 2026

== Release ==
Stillwater premiered on December 4, 2020 on Apple TV+. The episode "The Impossible Dream" was submitted to the Annecy Festival on June 14, 2021.

== Accolades ==
In 2021, the show won a Peabody Award, along with the Disney Channel animated series The Owl House.

Award	Date of ceremony	Category	Recipient(s)	Result	Ref.
Annie Awards	April 16, 2021	Best TV/Media - Preschool	Stillwater (for "The Impossible Dream / Stuck in the Rain")	Nominated	
Annie Awards	March 12, 2022	Best TV/Media - Preschool	Stillwater (for "Crossing Over / Kind of Blue")	Nominated	
Daytime Emmy Awards	July 17, 2021	Outstanding Preschool Children's Animated Series	Stillwater	Nominated	
Daytime Emmy Awards	July 17, 2021	Outstanding Writing Team for a Preschool Animated Program	Stillwater	Nominated	
Daytime Emmy Awards	July 17, 2021	Outstanding Directing Team for a Preschool Animated Program	Stillwater	Nominated	
Daytime Emmy Awards	July 17, 2021	Outstanding Editing for a Preschool Animated Program	Jill Calhoun, Jack Paulson	Won	
Peabody Awards	June 21, 2021	Children's & Youth	Stillwater (Shared with The Owl House)	Won	
Children's and Family Emmy Awards	December 10, 2022	Outstanding Directing Team for a Preschool Animated Program	Jun Falkenstein, Roy Burdine, Gary Hartle, Amber Tornquist Hollinger	Won	
Children's and Family Emmy Awards	December 10, 2022	Outstanding Editing for a Preschool Animated Program	Jill Calhoun, Jack Paulson	Nominated	
