= Mike Ploog =

American illustrator (born 1940/42)

- Born: Michael George Ploog; July 13, 1940 or 1942 Mankato, Minnesota, U.S.
- Areas: Penciller, Inker
- Notable works: Man-Thing; The Monster of Frankenstein; Ghost Rider; Werewolf by Night
- Awards: Inkpot Award (2007)

Michael G. Ploog (/pluːɡ/; born July 13, 1940 or 1942) is an American storyboard and comic book artist, and a visual designer for films.

In comics, Ploog is best known for his work on Marvel Comics' 1970s Man-Thing and The Monster of Frankenstein series, and as the initial artist on the features Ghost Rider and Werewolf by Night. His style at the time was heavily influenced by the art of Will Eisner, under whom he apprenticed.

== Biography ==
=== Early life and career ===
A typical spread from Will Eisner's U.S. Army publication PS, The Preventive Maintenance Monthly #224 (c. 1971), with art attributed to Ploog

Born in Mankato, Minnesota, Mike Ploog was one of a family of three brothers and a sister raised, initially, on a Minnesota farm. He began drawing while a young child, his imagination fired by such old-time radio dramas as Sergeant Preston of the Yukon and Gunsmoke, and such thriller anthologies as Inner Sanctum Mysteries and Tales of Horror. After his parents divorced and sold the farm when Ploog was about 10 or 11 years old, his mother took the children to live with her in Burbank, California. Ploog entered the U.S. Marine Corps, leaving in 1968 after ten years. Toward the end of his hitch, he began working on the Corps' Leatherneck Magazine, doing bits of writing, photography and art.

Around 1969 he began working on Batman and Superman animated TV series at the Los Angeles studio Filmation, doing what he called "cleanup work for other artists." The following season he was promoted to layout work on those characters' series. "Layout," Ploog recalled in a 1998 interview, "is what happens between storyboarding and actual animation; you're literally composing the scenes. You're more or less designing the background, putting the characters into it so they'll look like they're actually walking on the surface". Moving to the Hanna-Barbera studio the following season, he worked on layouts for the animated series Motormouse and Autocat and Wacky Races, as well as "the first Scooby-Doo pilot; nothing spectacular, though. It was okay; it was a salary, y'know? ... I had very few aspirations, because I didn't know where anything I was doing was going to take me".

A Hanna-Barbera colleague passed along a flyer he had gotten from writer-artist Will Eisner seeking an assistant on the military instructional publication PS, The Preventive Maintenance Monthly. Ploog was familiar with it from his Marine Corps days, and knew well the art, though not the artist's name. "I'd been copying his work for years," Ploog said, "because I was doing visual aids and training aids for the military for a long time".

Eisner in 1978 recalled: "Mike came in working for me in 1967 [sic; Ploog was still in the Marines that year]. I was looking for someone who could work on the PS magazine ... and Mike sent me his material, or somebody sent it to me, I don't remember which, and I found myself in California, talking Mike into coming to work for us.... We had a very happy relationship for maybe two or three years, four years."

Ploog moved to New York City and remained with Eisner for just over two years. As Ploog recalled:

Will had worked PS Magazine since about 1952, and [the owners] decided, 'We've got to put it out to somebody else.' You know, it's like he's got this dynasty going. So they said, 'Well, Will, you've got to do something. You've got to either back out of it altogether or find some way of doing this.' So Will came up with the idea: I picked up the contract, and Will became the shadow partner, and I moved across the street from Will's office into another office that he had. I don't know whether he had been leasing it, but we subleased it from Will, and we took over the book. Then it just got to be too much, because it's not that profitable without a partner, but if you've got a partner, then it becomes totally non-profitable.

=== Marvel Comics and Ghost Rider ===
Eventually, at the suggestion of Eisner letterer Ben Oda, Ploog broke into comics at Warren Publishing, doing stories for the company's black-and-white horror-comics magazines. A Western sample he showed Marvel got him a callback to draw Werewolf by Night, which premiered in Marvel Spotlight #2 (Feb. 1972). As Ploog recalled,

Somebody told me I should go to Marvel, so I got up a Western strip, oddly enough, called Tin Star. ... I went over there and they said the work was too cartoony and it wasn't Marvel-style. So I kind of gave up on it, and went back home, and less than a week later they gave me a call. Wanted me to come back in again. That's when I went in and talked to them about doing "Werewolf by Night."

After three stories in Marvel Spotlight, the feature spun off onto its own book. Ploog then helped launched the initial Johnny Blaze version of the supernatural motorcyclist Ghost Rider, in Marvel Spotlight #5 (Aug. 1972), and drew the next three adventures.

The specifics of the character's creation are disputed. Roy Thomas, a Marvel writer and the editor-in-chief at the time, recalls,

I had made up a character as a villain in Daredevil — a very lackluster character — called Stunt-Master ... a motorcyclist. Anyway, when Gary Friedrich started writing Daredevil, he said, 'Instead of Stunt-Master, I'd like to make the villain a really weird motorcycle-riding character called Ghost Rider'. He didn't describe him. I said, 'Yeah, Gary, there's only one thing wrong with it', and he kind of looked at me weird, because we were old friends from Missouri, and I said, 'That's too good an idea to be just a villain in Daredevil. He should start out right away in his own book'. When Gary wasn't there the day we were going to design it, Mike Ploog, who was going to be the artist, and I designed the character. I had this idea for the skull-head, something like Elvis' 1968 Special jumpsuit, and so forth, and Ploog put the fire on the head, just because he thought it looked nice. Gary liked it, so they went off and did it.

Friedrich has responded that,

Well, there's some disagreement between Roy, Mike and I over that. I threatened on more than one occasion that if Marvel gets in a position where they are gonna make a movie or make a lot of money off of it, I'm gonna sue them, and I probably will. ... It was my idea. It was always my idea from the first time we talked about it, it turned out to be a guy with a flaming skull and rode a motorcycle. Ploog seems to think the flaming skull was his idea. But, to tell you the truth, it was my idea.

Ploog recalled, in a 2008 interview:

Now, there's been all kinds of dialog about who was the creator of Ghost Rider. Gary Friedrich was the writer on it. ... The flaming skull: That was the big area of dispute. Who thought of the flaming skull? To be honest with you I can't remember. What else were you going to do with him? You couldn't put a helmet on him, so it had to be a flaming skull. As far as his costume went, it was part of the old [Western] Ghost Rider's costume, with the Western panel front. The stripes down the arms and the legs were there merely so I could make the character['s costume] as black as I possibly could and still keep track of his body. It was the easiest way to design him.

The Eisneresque Topaz: Splash panel, Werewolf by Night #13 (Jan. 1974). Art by Ploog and inker Frank Chiaramonte.

Ploog and writer Gary Friedrich collaborated on the first six issues of Marvel's The Monster of Frankenstein (Jan.-Oct. 1973), the initial four of which contained a more faithful adaptation of Mary Shelley's novel than has mostly appeared elsewhere; comics historian Don Markstein said, "It was faithful to the story even to the point of leaving the monster trapped in the ice at the end — so of course, the fifth issue began with him being rescued." In a 1989 interview, Ploog said, "I really enjoyed doing Frankenstein because I related to that naive monster wandering around a world he had no knowledge of — an outsider seeing everything through the eyes of a child." The following year, Ploog teamed with writer Steve Gerber on Man-Thing #5-11 (May-Nov. 1974), penciling a critically acclaimed series of stories involving a dead clown, psychic paralysis in the face of modern society, and other topics far removed from the usual fare of comics of the time, with Ploog's cute-but-creepy art style setting off Gerber's trademark intellectual surrealism.

Ploog's other regular titles at Marvel were Planet of the Apes, Kull the Destroyer and the series Werewolf by Night. Ploog also drew the Don McGregor story "The Reality Manipulators" in the black-and-white comics magazine Marvel Preview #8 (Fall 1976), and the Doug Moench feature "Weirdworld" in the color comic Marvel Premiere #38 (Oct. 1977), among other items.

He left Marvel following what he describes as "a disagreement with Jim Shooter. I had moved to a farm in Minnesota, and agreed to do a hand-colored 'Weirdworld' story. Marvel backed out of the deal after I had started. I can't remember the details, but it doesn't matter. I think I was ready to move on." "Marvel and I were both changing. I finished off a black-and-white Kull book that was my last comic for many years." Richard Marschall, editor of what was to be a 60-page "Weirdworld" by Ploog and writer Moench for one of the Marvel Super Special series of one-shots, said at the time that Ploog had been given four months to complete the art, and when it became evident the deadline would not be met, arranged to publish the story in two 30-page installments, giving Ploog two more months. Ploog sent Marvel photocopies of the first 31 pages, and was paid for them. During this time, Marvel had given work-for-hire contracts to its freelancers, many of whom, including Ploog, Frank Brunner, Jack Kirby, Don McGregor, Roger Slifer, and Roger Stern, refused to sign, resulting in cessation of work for Marvel. Ploog "took himself off the project," said Marschall, and retained his original artwork. Moench's script was eventually published as a 106-page story illustrated by penciler John Buscema, inker Rudy Nebres, and airbrush colorist Peter Ledger as the three-part "Warriors of the Shadow Realm" in Marvel Super Special #11-13 (Spring - Fall 1979).

Marginalia includes some work for Heavy Metal magazine in 1981, and three "Luke Malone, Manhunter" backup features in the Atlas/Seaboard title Police Action #1-3 (Feb., April, June 1975), the first of which he also scripted.

=== Later career ===
Ploog returned to the movie industry. By his account, he has worked in post-production on the movie Ghostbusters ("All that stuff you saw on cereal boxes are my paintings") and with film director Ralph Bakshi on the animated features Wizards, The Lord of the Rings, and Hey Good Lookin'. He was production designer on Michael Jackson: Moonwalker (1988), and has storyboarded or done other design work on films including John Carpenter's The Thing, Superman II, Little Shop of Horrors and The Unbearable Lightness of Being, and, he says, several Jim Henson Company projects, such as the films The Dark Crystal and Labyrinth and the TV series The Storyteller.

Between movies, Ploog illustrated L. Frank Baum's the Life and Adventures of Santa Claus (1992; ISBN 0-7567-6682-6), a graphic novel adapting The Wonderful Wizard of Oz creator's 1902 novella.

With old colleague Steve Gerber, Ploog drew the Malibu Comics Ultraverse one-shot Sludge: Red X-Mas (Dec. 1994), but otherwise remained away from comics for another decade before teaming with veteran writer J.M. DeMatteis on the CrossGen fantasy Abadazad (May 2004).

Ploog has illustrated cards for the Magic: The Gathering and Guardians collectible card games.

== Bibliography ==
=== Comics and magazines ===
==== Warren Publishing ====
- Creepy #44 ("Sleep") (1972)
- Eerie #35 ("The Tower of the Demon Dooms"); #40 ("The Brain of Frankenstein") (1971–72)
- Vampirella #14 ("The Wedding Gift") (1971)

==== Marvel Comics ====
- Amazing Adventures #12 (inker) (The Beast) (1972)
- Conan The Barbarian #57 (1975)
- Crazy Magazine #1 ("Kung Fooey"); 4 ("Shafted"); #7 ("The Tattletale Heart") (1973–74)
- Dracula Lives #4 ("Fear Stalker") (1974)
- Frankenstein #1-6 (1973)
- Kull The Destroyer #11-15 (1973–74)
- Man-Thing #5-11; Giant-Size Man-Thing #1 (1974)
- Marvel Fanfare #24 (Weirdworld) (1984)
- Marvel Premiere #38 (Weirdworld) (1977)
- Marvel Preview #8 ("The Reality Manipulators") (1976)
- Marvel Spotlight #2–4 (Werewolf by Night); #5-8 (Ghost Rider) (1972–73)
- Marvel Super Action #1 ("An Ugly Mirror on Weirdworld") (1976)
- Planet of the Apes #1-4, #6-8, #11, #13-14, #19 (1974–76)
- Savage Sword of Conan #34 ("Mirrors of Tuzun Thune") (Kull) (1978)
- Werewolf by Night #1-7, #13-16 (1972–74)

==== Big Apple Productions ====
- Big Apple Comix ("The Silent Minority") (1975)

==== Pacific Comics ====
- Twisted Tales #2 ("Over His Head") (1983)

==== First Comics ====
- Classics Illustrated #9 - The Adventures of Tom Sawyer (1990)

==== Tundra Publishing ====
- L. Frank Baum's The Life and Adventures of Santa Claus (1992)

==== Malibu Comics ====
- Sludge Red X-Mas #1 (1994)

==== CrossGen Comics ====
- Abadazad (2004)

==== Image Comics ====
- The Stardust Kid #1-3 (2005)

==== Boom! Studios ====
- The Stardust Kid #4-5 (2006–07)

==== Dark Horse Comics ====
- The Goon Noir #1 ("When Franky Fell from Favor") (2006)

==== Full Circle Publications ====
- Thicker Than Blood #1-3 (with Simon Bisley) (2007–08)

==== DC Comics ====
- The Spirit (2007 series) #14, #31-32 (2008-09)
- The Spirit (2010 series) #9 ("The Christmas Spirit") (2011)
