= Why I Will Never Ever Ever Ever Have Enough Time to Read This Book =

Book by Remy Charlip

- Cover (2004 edition, pub. by Tricycle Press)
- Author: Remy Charlip
- Illustrator: Jon J. Muth
- Publication date: September 1, 2000

Why I Will Never Ever Ever Ever Have Enough Time to Read This Book is a 2000 children's picture book by Remy Charlip, and illustrated by Jon J. Muth. In the book, a busy girl tries to find time to read, but something always stops her. By nightfall, she has not managed to read her book.

== Reception ==
A Book Links review said: "The 'meta' part is that we are reading the very same book that she is reading, and we often see her reading a page in her book which looks the same as the page we are reading".

A Publishers Weekly review said: "He gives the tale additional punch by varying the pace from full-page scenes to frame-by-frame snapshots and by casting the main characters as an intriguingly multicultural extended family. Readers will also enjoy the recurring visual pun as they spy the very same book they're reading in the hand of the girl, and the same page they're looking at almost every time she manages to sneak a peek at it".

Booklist said the book is "utterly charming (and more than a little surreal) [and] winsome in text and art".

School Library Journal in their review wrote: "The true charm of the book lies in its tongue-in-cheek presentation and lively watercolor illustrations. Muth has created a multiracial, multigenerational array of friends and family who surround the unnamed protagonist. Careful observers will be tickled to note that the gifts open book always mirrors the pages they are reading. A light, original diversion".
