= Green Lantern: Willworld =

2001 graphic novel by J. M. DeMatteis

- Cover to Green Lantern: Will World. Art by Seth Fisher.
- Date: July 2001
- Main characters: Green Lantern
- Page count: 94 pages
- Publisher: DC Comics

Creative team
- Writers: J. M. DeMatteis
- Artists: Seth Fisher
- Letterers: Tom Orzechowski
- Colourists: Chris Chuckry
- Editors: Joey Cavalieri
- ISBN: 1563897822

Green Lantern: Willworld is an original graphic novel written by J. M. DeMatteis and illustrated by Seth Fisher released by DC Comics in hardcover in July 2001.

== Publication history ==
The artist Seth Fisher notes that:

Willworld was conceived after I pitched a story idea with art samples to Joey Cavaleri at DC. We brainstormed and decided to use the art style as a starting point for a Hal Jordan story. I wanted a writer that would shrug off some of the spandex cliches that I was worried could limit my art, but still tackle the fantastic. I wanted it to be both surreal and yet grounded at the same time.

Fisher has also said that "we wanted a book where I could squeeze my imagination for everything it was worth and 'Green Lantern' just seemed to have the most potential that way".

Writer J. M. DeMatteis described the story as "Green Lantern meets Little Nemo in Quantum Wonderland. A playful, surreal, quantum physics fairytale".

The book was released as a hardcover in July 2001 (ISBN 1563897822) and softcover in December 2003 (ISBN 1563899930).

== Plot ==
This story tells how a young Hal Jordan mastered his power ring. The story is set on a world formed entirely by the imagination of other Green Lanterns.

== Critical reception ==
Locus Magazine gave the book a positive review and noted that it was "stunning stuff, highly recommended".
