= Kent Williams (artist) =

American painter and graphic novel artist

- Born: Kent Robert Williams; 1962 (age 63–64) New Bern, North Carolina, U.S.
- Area: Artist
- Notable works: Blood: A Tale; Hellblazer; Kent Williams: Drawings & Monotypes; Koan: Paintings by Jon J Muth & Kent Williams; Kent Williams, Amalgam: Paintings & Drawings, 1992-2007
- Awards: Yellow Kid Award

Kent Robert Williams (born 1962) is an American painter and graphic novel artist.

Williams, a draftsman and painter, has realized his work through various other artistic channels as well; that of the illustrated word and the graphic novel (including The Fountain with filmmaker Darren Aronofsky), printmaking, photography, design, architecture, and film. A selection of his works on paper, Kent Williams: Drawings & Monotypes, was published in 1991, and Koan: Paintings by Jon J Muth & Kent Williams, was published in 2001. His monograph, Kent Williams, Amalgam: Paintings & Drawings, 1992-2007, with text by Edward Lucie-Smith and Julia Morton, is the most comprehensive collection of Williams' work to date.

More recent publications include Kent Williams, Eklektikos (ASFA, 2011), with text by Peter Frank and Alex Ross; :Opthalm (ASFA, 2013); Via Lactea: His Drawings and Paintings of the Artist Soey Milk (ASFA); and The Kwaidan Collection (Beehive Books, Philadelphia, 2023), co-authored with Lafcadio Hearn, with an introduction by Darren Aronofsky, foreword by Kyoko Yoshida, and afterword by Bon Koizumi.

== Early life ==
Williams was born in New Bern, North Carolina. He attended the Pratt Institute in New York City and graduated in 1984.

== Comics ==
From 1983 to 1985, Kent Williams was a regular contributor to Marvel Comics' Epic Illustrated. He collaborated with writer J. M. DeMatteis on Blood: A Tale in 1987 and with writers Walt and Louise Simonson and co-artist Jon J Muth on Havok and Wolverine: Meltdown the following year. The latter series was a result of Williams and Muth's desire to work on a project together. Williams was the regular cover artist for DC Comics' Hellblazer in 1990–1991. Comics historian Les Daniels noted that Williams' "impressionistic painting style is an example of the new look that DC's Vertigo line brought to comics." Williams drew the "Fear of Falling" short story for Vertigo Preview #1 (1993) which featured the Sandman and was written by Neil Gaiman. In 2006 he illustrated a graphic novel adaptation of The Fountain from the script by filmmaker Darren Aronofsky.

== Teaching ==
Kent Williams was a visiting instructor at the Pratt Institute, and has taught at the California College of the Arts, San Francisco; East Carolina University, Greenville, North Carolina, and the California Institute of the Arts (CalArts), Valencia, California. Williams lives in Los Angeles and teaches painting at the Art Center College of Design in Pasadena, California. In addition, he is an MFA mentor faculty at the Laguna College of Art and Design.

== Fine art career ==
Williams' career as a fine art painter has run parallel to his comics work since the early 1990s. His painting Trace Double-Portrait was exhibited at the Smithsonian National Portrait Gallery in Washington, D.C., as part of the Outwin Boochever Portrait Painting and Sculpture Exhibition in 2006–2007.

His work has been included in significant international group exhibitions, including In the Land of Retinal Delights: The Juxtapoz Factor at the Laguna Art Museum, Laguna Beach, California (2008); Art of the New World at the Bristol City Museum and Art Gallery, Bristol, United Kingdom (2010); and Your Body as an Excuse: Eroticism in Art at the European Museum of Modern Art (MEAM), Barcelona, Spain (2020).

In 2022, Williams presented Kwaidan, a solo exhibition at KP Projects, Los Angeles, in which he interpreted the supernatural Japanese stories of Lafcadio Hearn through painting, resulting in the 2023 publication The Kwaidan Collection (Beehive Books), with an introduction by Darren Aronofsky.

Williams is currently represented by Evoke Contemporary in Santa Fe, New Mexico, and Ryan Graff Contemporary in San Francisco, California.

== Personal life ==
Williams lives in Los Angeles with his wife, painter Soey Milk. He has two sons, Kerig Sun and Ian Kai.

== Exhibitions ==
His work has been the subject of a number of solo exhibitions including shows in New York City; San Francisco; Sundance, Utah; the Nasher Museum of Art, Durham, North Carolina; in Santa Fe, New Mexico, where he is represented by Evoke Contemporary Gallery; and in Los Angeles, where he is represented by The Merry Karnowsky Gallery. His painting Trace Double-Portrait was exhibited at the National Portrait Gallery in Washington, D.C., as part of the Outwin Boochever 2006 Portrait Exhibition.

== Awards ==
Williams is the recipient of a number of awards for his work, including the Yellow Kid Award, Lucca, Italy's comics award. In 2001, he was invited to be a fellow at the Sundance Filmmakers Lab in Sundance, Utah.

== Comics bibliography ==
=== Byron Preiss Visual Publications ===
- The Ray Bradbury Chronicles #1 (1992)

=== Darkstorm Productions ===
- Darkstorm #1–2 (1982)

=== DC Comics ===
- Batman Black and White #2 (1996)
- Sandman Special #1 (one page) (1991)
- Tell Me, Dark GN (1992)

==== Paradox Press ====
- The Big Book Of Urban Legends (1994)

==== Piranha Press ====
- Prince: Alter Ego #1 (1991)

==== Vertigo ====
- Death Gallery #1 (one page) (1994)
- Destiny: A Chronicle of Deaths Foretold #1–3 (1996)
- Fight for Tomorrow #1–6 (2002–2003)
- Flinch #4 (1999)
- The Fountain GN (2005)
- Shade, the Changing Man vol. 2 #50 (one page) (1994)
- Vertigo Preview #1 (1993)
- Vertigo: Winter's Edge #2 (1999)

=== Eclipse Comics ===
- Eclipse Magazine #3, 7 (1981–1982)
- Sabre #7, 8 (1983)

=== Last Gasp ===
- Strip AIDS U.S.A. (1988)

=== Marvel Comics ===
- The Brotherhood #1–3, 7–9 (2001–2002)
- Marvel Fanfare #40 (one page) (1988)
- Uncanny X-Men #252 (1989)
- Wolverine: Killing #1 (1993)

==== Epic Comics ====
- A1 vol. 2 #3 (1992)
- Blood: A Tale #1–4 (1987)
- Clive Barker's Book of the Damned: A Hellraiser Companion #4 (1993)
- Clive Barker's Hellraiser #1, 4 (1989–1990)
- Epic Illustrated #19, 29, 33 (1983–1985)
- Havok & Wolverine - Meltdown #1–4 (1988–1989)
- Shadowline Saga: Critical Mass #3 (1990)

=== New Media Publishing ===
- The Comic Times, Media Showcase #7 (1981)

=== Pacific Comics ===
- Captain Victory and the Galactic Rangers #12 (backup story) (1983)
