= J. M. DeMatteis =

American writer (born 1953)

- Born: John Marc DeMatteis; December 15, 1953 (age 72) New York City, U.S.
- Area: Writer
- Pseudonyms: Michael Ellis; Wally Lombego
- Notable works: Justice League International; Captain America; Doctor Fate; "Kraven's Last Hunt"; Moonshadow; "Clone Saga"
- Spouse: Diane DeMatteis (m. 1993)
- Children: 2

John Marc DeMatteis (/diːməˈteɪəs/; born December 15, 1953) is an American writer of comic books, television, film, and novels. He is known for psychologically and spiritually driven stories that dive deep into the human heart and mind.

== Biography ==
=== Early career ===
J.M. DeMatteis was born in Brooklyn, New York City. His father was Italian-Catholic, his mother of Jewish heritage, and DeMatteis has been a longtime follower of the Indian spiritual master Avatar Meher Baba. DeMatteis's earliest aspirations were to be a rock musician and comic book artist. He began playing in bands starting in the sixth grade, generally in the role of lead singer, songwriter and rhythm guitarist, and also wrote music reviews for a number of publications. He began drawing at a young age, and was accepted into the School of the Visual Arts, but had to decline for financial reasons. He graduated from Midwood High School in Brooklyn in 1971 and received a BA in English from SUNY Empire.

DeMatteis then turned from drawing to writing. He got his start in comic books at DC Comics in the late 1970s. After a number of rejected submissions, his first accepted story was "The Lady-Killer Craves Blood", but it would not be published until years later in House of Mystery #282 (July 1980). His first published story for the company was "The Blood Boat!" in Weird War Tales #70 (Dec. 1978). He contributed to the company's line of horror comics notably with the creation of the Creature Commandos in Weird War Tales #93 (Nov. 1980) and I…Vampire in House of Mystery #290 (March 1981). He briefly wrote the Aquaman feature in Adventure Comics as well. DeMatteis and artist Brian Bolland produced a backup story titled "Falling Down to Heaven" in Madame Xanadu, DC's first attempt at marketing comics specifically to the "direct market" of fans and collectors. DeMatteis had long been eager to work for Marvel Comics, and following roughly a year in which editor-in-chief Jim Shooter kept him busy with odd jobs and fill-ins, in 1980 he was made the lead writer for Marvel on The Defenders, and had lengthy runs on Marvel Team-Up and Captain America, paired with penciler Mike Zeck, with whom in 1982 he created the character Arnie Roth, a Jewish childhood friend and protector to Steve Rogers and the first openly gay character to appear in a mainstream superhero comic.

=== 1980s ===
After writing a negative review of the Grateful Dead's 1980 album Go to Heaven which was published in Rolling Stone, DeMatteis ended his career as a music critic. He explained, "Grateful Dead fans are like hardcore comic book fans, you know... and I know that when I sit down to write a review that I'm just some shmuck sitting down at a typewriter with an opinion—but then it's in print in something like Rolling Stone. I got all these letters, which I saved, from all these hardcore Grateful Dead fans—wounded. ... I said if I'm going to review at all I'm not going to write negative reviews anymore..." Around this time he also surrendered his professional career as a rock musician, after years of playing in New York City–based bands.

In 1984, DeMatteis and artist Bob Budiansky produced a Prince Namor limited series. He saw the series as an opportunity to both delve more into the psychology of the title character than he had been able to in The Defenders and to continue his collaboration with Budiansky from the recently canceled Ghost Rider, later recalling, "We'd get on the phone, start talking, and the stories would come so easily. We had a fantastic rapport, personally and professionally." DeMatteis had mixed feelings about the series itself, and said the one part of which he was unreservedly proud was the look into Namor's years as an amnesiac homeless man. DeMatteis and illustrator Jon J. Muth created the graphic novel Moonshadow, for Marvel's Epic line: the groundbreaking story was the first fully painted series in American comics. DeMatteis followed this with the 1986 Doctor Strange graphic novel Into Shamballa drawn by Dan Green and Blood: A Tale, a hallucinatory vampire story drawn by Kent Williams. In 1987, DeMatteis and Zeck re-teamed for the "Kraven's Last Hunt" arc that ran throughout Marvel's then-three Spider-Man titles. The arc has been collected in multiple editions and remains one of the most popular, and respected, stories in Spider-Man's history.

Moving back to DC, DeMatteis had a memorable run writing Doctor Fate, first in a mini-series illustrated by Keith Giffen, then in an ongoing series illustrated by Shawn McManus. He succeeded Gerry Conway as writer of the superhero-team title Justice League of America, using the pen name Michael Ellis on his first issue of the series. When that title was cancelled in the wake of the company-wide crossover Legends, DeMatteis stayed through its relaunch as Justice League International, scripting over the plots of Keith Giffen.

JLI took such lesser-known DC characters as Martian Manhunter, Blue Beetle, Booster Gold, Mister Miracle, Captain Atom, and Power Girl and turned the then-current preoccupation with "grim 'n' gritty" superheroes on its head. The lighthearted series emphasized the absurd aspects of people with strange powers, wearing colorful costumes, volunteering to fight evildoers. Although the League had its serious side and often faced world-threatening villains, the stories included such characters as the lovably inept G'nort, the worst Green Lantern in the Green Lantern Corps, Mr. Nebula, the interplanetary decorator, the Injustice League, a bunch of bumbling losers and a flock of homicidal penguins who had been hybridized with piranhas. The success of Justice League International led to a spin-off in 1989 titled Justice League Europe also co-written with Giffen and featuring art by Bart Sears.

=== 1990s ===
The Giffen/DeMatteis team worked on Justice League for five years and closed out their run with the "Breakdowns" storyline in 1991 and 1992. DeMatteis scripted Justice League spin-offs such as solo series for Mister Miracle and Doctor Fate.

Back at Marvel, DeMatteis again succeeded Conway, this time as writer of The Spectacular Spider-Man in 1991, taking the series in a grimmer, more psychologically oriented direction. In collaboration with regular artist Sal Buscema, DeMatteis' story arc "The Child Within" (#178–184) featured the return of the Harry Osborn Green Goblin. Spider-Man's battle with the Goblin continued in "The Osborn Legacy" in #189 and came to an end when Harry died in "The Best Of Enemies!" (#200).

In 1993, DeMatteis wrote the first prestige one-shot for Vertigo Comics, Mercy.

In 1994, DeMatteis took over from David Michelinie as writer of The Amazing Spider-Man #389–406 for a run that included the apparent death of Peter Parker's Aunt May and the beginnings of the "Clone Saga" arc. DeMatteis as well worked on such characters as Doctor Strange, Daredevil, Man-Thing, and the Silver Surfer.

DeMatteis helped launch DC's mature-audience Vertigo imprint, writing the graphic novels Mercy and Farewell, Moonshadow (a sequel to the Epic Comics series), the miniseries The Last One, and the 15-issue series Seekers Into The Mystery, the story of a Hollywood screenwriter on a journey of self-discovery and the search for universal truths.

DeMatteis wrote an autobiographical, digest-sized miniseries Brooklyn Dreams, published by DC's Paradox Press imprint. DeMatteis' most personal work, it was later collected in one volume under the Vertigo imprint. The book was later collected by IDW and in a 2025 deluxe edition from Dark Horse.

=== 21st century ===
In the 2000s, DeMatteis redefined the Spectre, through the character of Hal Jordan, as a spirit of redemption rather than of vengeance. DeMatteis co-scripted the "Gods of Gotham" storyline in Wonder Woman #164–166 (January to March 2001) with Phil Jimenez. In 2003, with Giffen, he revived the Justice League International for the mini-series Formerly Known as the Justice League. The series won Giffen, DeMatteis and artist Kevin Maguire an Eisner Award. The team followed this with "I Can't Believe It's Not the Justice League" arc in JLA Classified and, at Marvel, a five-issue run of The Defenders. In 2006, DeMatteis and Giffen began work on two original superhero comedy series, Hero Squared and Planetary Brigade for Boom! Studios. DeMatteis teamed with veteran artist Mike Ploog to create the CrossGen fantasy comic Abadazad (May 2004). The following year, Ploog and DeMatteis announced they were collaborating on a five-issue miniseries, Stardust Kid, from the Image Comics imprint Desperado Publishing. The series moved to Boom! Studios in 2006.

The Walt Disney Company acquired Abadazad for its Hyperion Books for Children imprint. The first two books in the series—Abadazad: The Road to Inconceivable and Abadazad: The Dream Thief—were released June 2006. The third book—Abadazad: The Puppet, The Professor and The Prophet—was released in the United Kingdom in 2007.

In June 2010, DeMatteis's children's fantasy novel, Imaginalis, was published by Katherine Tegen Books, an imprint of HarperCollins.

In 2008, DeMatteis became editor-in-chief of Ardden Entertainment, guiding the launch of a new Flash Gordon comic book series. In 2009, he wrote a five-issue comic book limited series, illustrated by Mike Cavallaro, The Life and Times of Savior 28, which was released by IDW Publishing in 2009. He also wrote the Metal Men back-up story in the new Doom Patrol and returned to Marvel Comics for a number of new Spider-Man stories. In 2010, DeMatteis reunited once again with frequent collaborator Keith Giffen for a run on the comic book series Booster Gold. The two teamed on the DC Retroactive: JLA – The '90s one-shot in October 2011. Also in 2011, DeMatteis created the all-ages fantasy The Adventures of Augusta Wind for IDW Publishing. In 2013, he took over DC Comics' Phantom Stranger and launched the 12-issue Larfleeze series with Giffen. DeMatteis became the writer of Justice League Dark in October 2013 and, again with Giffen, launched Justice League 3000 in December.

In 2015, DeMatteis worked with Bruce Timm for Justice League: Gods and Monsters, a comic book prequel to the film. In 2016, Giffen and DeMatteis launched Scooby Apocalypse for DC—a more adult reimagining of the classic cartoon—and IDW published DeMatteis's Augusta Wind sequel The Adventures of Augusta Wind: The Last Story. 2018 saw the release of the IDW series Impossible, Incorporated, with another new creator-owned series, The Girl in the Bay, from Berger Books, announced for 2019. In 2021, Marvel announced a new limited series titled Ben Reilly: Spider-Man written by DeMatteis with art by David Baldeón, released in 2022. The same year, Marvel announced the forthcoming series Spider-Man: The Lost Hunt, which ties in to DeMatteis' Spider-Man classic, Kraven's Last Hunt. Also in 2022, DeMatteis, in collaboration with Spellbound Comics, launched The DeMultiverse, four new series written by DeMatteis and illustrated by Shawn McManus, Tom Mandrake, Matthew Dow Smith, and David Baldeon. He also published a novel, the supernatural thriller, The Excavator, followed the next year by another supernatural novel, The Witness.

In 2024, Marvel published a new Spider-Man series, Shadow of the Green Goblin, and DC launched the Batman mini-series Robin Lives! DeMatteis and Spellbound Comics also launched Phase II of their DeMultiverse titles on Kickstarter.

In 2025, it was announced DeMatteis would be writing a sequel mini-series to Spider-Man: The Animated Series for Marvel, finally resolving the show's cliffhanger and reuniting Peter Parker with Mary Jane Watson, and examining how the pair navigate their drastically altered status quo together. DeMatteis also announced a new novel, the metaphysical time travel tale Dark Future, which will be published by Neotext in 2026.

At the 2025 San Diego Comic Con International, DeMatteis was honored with the Inkpot Award for his contributions to the comic book medium.

==== Spellbound Comics ====
In October 2022, DeMatteis announced the founding of his own publisher named Spellbound Comics. Through a Kickstarter campaign, he presented the DeMultiverse, a collection of four "pilot issues" of comics titled Anyman, Godsend, Layla in the Lands of After and Wisdom. In November, he presented a fifth series titled The Edward Gloom Mysteries. The second wave of DeMatteis's Spellbound series launched on Kickstarter in the summer of 2024, offering second chapters of all the DeMultiverse titles, with more planned for the future.

=== Other media ===
DeMatteis has also written for television, having scripted episodes of the 1980s incarnation of The Twilight Zone, the syndicated series The Adventures of Superboy and Earth: Final Conflict, as well as for the animated series The Real Ghostbusters, Justice League Unlimited, Legion of Super Heroes, Batman: The Brave and the Bold, Ben 10: Ultimate Alien, Sym-Bionic Titan, ThunderCats, Teen Titans Go! and Marvel's Spider-Man. DeMatteis also wrote the 2015 animated DTV movie Batman vs. Robin and its 2016 sequel, Batman: Bad Blood. The same year, DeMatteis wrote multiple episodes of Cartoon Network's Be Cool, Scooby-Doo!. In 2017, DeMatteis co-wrote Justice League Dark and, in 2018, he wrote the spin-off animated series Constantine: City of Demons. The same year he wrote animated shorts starring Adam Strange and Neil Gaiman's Sandman character, Death. In 2020 DeMatteis wrote Deathstroke: Knights & Dragons, as well as the animated adaptation of the graphic novel Superman: Red Son. In 2024, he wrote an episode of Amazon's Batman: Caped Crusader series, which will be part of the show's upcoming second season.

Also a musician, DeMatteis released one album in the late 1990s, How Many Lifetimes?.

== Awards ==
- 2004: Won the "Best Humor Publication" Eisner Award, for Formerly Known as the Justice League, with Keith Giffen, Kevin Maguire, and Josef Rubinstein
- 2018: Won the Etna Comics, Sicily, Maestro Del Fumetto Award.
- 2025: San Diego Comic Con Inkpot Award for lifetime achievement.

== Bibliography ==
=== Comics ===
==== IDW Publishing ====
- The Life and Times of Savior 28 #1–5 (2009)
- The Adventures of Augusta Wind #1–5 (2013)
- The Adventures of Augusta Wind-The Last Story #1–5 (2016)
- Impossible Inc. #1–5 (2019)

==== Dark Horse Comics ====
- Dark Horse Presents #2 (1986)
- The Girl in the Bay #1–4 (2019)

==== DC Comics ====
- 9-11: The World's Finest Comic Book Writers & Artists Tell Stories to Remember, Volume Two (2002)
- Action Comics #517–520 (1981)
- Adventure Comics #475–478 (1980)
- Adventures of Superman #578–587 (2000–2001)
- Adventures of Superman vol. 2 #2 (2013)
- All Out War #1 (1979)
- The Authority: The Lost Year #8–9 (2010)
- Batman & Spider-Man: New Age Dawning (1997)
- Batman: Absolution #1 (2003)
- Batman: Legends of the Dark Knight #65–68, 149–153 (1994–2002)
- Batman: Two-Face Crime and Punishment #1 (1995)
- Booster Gold vol. 2 #32–43 (2010–2011)
- The Brave and the Bold #164 (1980)
- Convergence: Justice League International #2 (2015)
- DC Retroactive: Justice League of America – The '90s #1 (2011)
- Detective Comics #489, 493–495 (1980)
- Doctor Fate #1–4 (1987)
- Doctor Fate vol. 2 #1–24, Annual #1 (1988–1991)
- Doom Patrol vol. 5 #1–7 (2009–2010)
- Farewell, Moonshadow (graphic novel) (1997)
- Forever People vol. 2 #1–6 (1988)
- Formerly Known as the Justice League #1–6 (2003–2004)
- From the DC Vault: Death In The Family – Robin Lives! 1-4 (2024)
- Green Lantern: Willworld (graphic novel) (2001)
- Heroes Against Hunger #1 (1986)
- House of Mystery #270, 272, 274, 282, 284, 287–291, 293, 295, 297–298, 321 (1979–1983)
- JLA #35 (1999)
- JLA Classified #4–9 (2005)
- JLA/The Spectre: Soul War #1 (2003)
- Justice League (a.k.a. Justice League International, Justice League America) #1–60 Annual #1–5 (1987–1992)
- Justice League 3000 #1–15 (2014–2015)
- Justice League 3001 #1–12 (2015–2016)
- Justice League Dark #24–40, Annual #1–2, Futures End #1 (2013–2015)
- Justice League Europe #1–9, 13, Annual #1 (1989–1990)
- Justice League of America #256–261 (1986–1987)
- Justice League Quarterly #1–2, 4 (1990–1991)
- Justice League: Gods and Monsters #1–3 (2015)
- Justice League: Gods and Monsters – Batman #1 (2015)
- Justice League: Gods and Monsters – Superman #1 (2015)
- Justice League: Gods and Monsters -Wonder Woman #1 (2015)
- Justice League Infinity #1–5 (2021)
- Larfleeze #1–12 (2013–2014)
- Legends of the DC Universe #33–36 (2000–2001)
- Legion of Super-Heroes vol. 2 #265, 268 (1980)
- Madame Xanadu #1 (1981)
- Martian Manhunter #1–4 (1988)
- Mister Miracle vol. 2 #1–8 (1989)
- Mystery in Space #112–113, 116–117 (1980–1981)
- Phantom Stranger vol. 4 #4–8 (2013)
- Realworlds: Justice League of America #1 (2000)
- Scooby Apocalypse #1–36 (2016–2019)
- Secret Origins vol. 2 #34 (1988)
- Secret Origins vol. 3 #6 (2014)
- Secrets of Haunted House #26 (1980)
- Spectre vol. 4 #1–27 (2001–2003)
- Supergirl: Wings (2001)
- Superman: Speeding Bullets (1993)
- Superman: The Kansas Sighting #1–2 (2004)
- Superman: The Man of Tomorrow #15 (1999)
- Superman: Where Is Thy Sting? #1 (2001)
- Time Warp #2–4 (1979–1980)
- Trinity of Sin #1–6 (2014–2015)
- Trinity of Sin: Phantom Stranger #9–22, Futures End #1 (2013–2014)
- The Unexpected #199–200, 205 (1980)
- Weird War Tales #70, 72, 76, 79, 85, 91, 93–97, 102, 105, 108 (1978–1982)
- Wonder Woman vol. 2 #164–166 (2001)
- World's Finest Comics #262, 264–268 (1980–1981)

===== Paradox Press =====
- Brooklyn Dreams #1–4 (1995)

===== Vertigo =====
- The Last One #1–6 (1993)
- Mercy (1993)
- Seekers into the Mystery #1–15 (1996–1997)

===== WildStorm =====
- Wetworks #10–15 (2007–2008)

==== Marvel Comics ====
- Amazing Adventure #1 (1988)
- The Amazing Spider-Man #223 (co-wrote w/ Dennis O'Neil), 293–294, 368–370, 389–406, 634–637, 700, Annual #24 (1981–2013)
- The Amazing Spider-Man Family #1, 3–4 (2008–2009)
- The Amazing Spider-Man: Soul of the Hunter #1 (1992)
- The Avengers #209, 218, Annual #11 (1981–1982)
- Ben Reilly: Spider-Man #1–5 (2022)
- Bizarre Adventures #29, 33 (1981–1982)
- Captain America #261–264, 267–270, 272, 275–290, 292–300, Annual #6 (1981–1984)
- Captain Justice #1–2 (1988)
- Chaos War: Thor #1–2 (2011)
- Conan the Barbarian #116, 118–130 (1980–1982)
- Daredevil #344–350 (1995–1996)
- Daydreamers #1–3 (1997)
- The Defenders #92–118, 120–131 (1981–1984)
- Defenders vol. 3 #1–5 (2005–2006)
- Doctor Strange: Into Shamballa (part of Marvel Graphic Novel series) (1985)
- Doctor Strange, Sorcerer Supreme #84–90 (1995–1996)
- Gargoyle #1–4 (1985)
- Ghost Rider #67, 71, 74–81 (1982–1983)
- Greenberg the Vampire (part of Marvel Graphic Novel series) (1985)
- The Hulk! #26–27 (1981)
- Iceman #1–4 (1984–1985)
- Longshot #1 (1998)
- Man-Thing vol. 2 #9 (1981)
- Man-Thing #1–8 (1997–1998)
- Marc Spector: Moon Knight #26–32 (1991)
- Marvel Adventures Spider-Man #19 (2011)
- Marvel Adventures Super Heroes #21 (2012)
- Marvel Fanfare #9, 31–32, 39 (1983–1988)
- Marvel Holiday Special #4 (1995)
- Marvel Super Special #17 ("Xanadu"); #37 ("2010") (1980–1985)
- Marvel Team-Up #101, 111–112, 114–133 (1981–1983)
- Mighty Thor Annual #1 (2012)
- Peter Parker: Spider-Man Annual 1999 #1 (1999)
- Prince Namor, the Sub-Mariner #1–4 (1984)
- Pro Action Magazine #1 (1994)
- Savage Sword of Conan #65–66 (1981)
- The Sensational Spider-Man '96 #1 (1996)
- Silver Surfer #125–145, #-1 (1997–1998)
- Silver Surfer '97 (1997)
- Silver Surfer/Thor ’98 (1998)
- Solo Avengers #9 (1988)
- The Spectacular Spider-Man #131–132, 178–203, 217, 223, 241–257, #-1, Annual #13–14 (1987–1998)
- Spider-Man #37–40, 51, 57 (1993–1995)
- Spider-Man '94 #1–4 (2025)
- Spider-Man: Redemption #1–4 (1996)
- Spider-Man: Shadow Of The Green Goblin #1–4 (2024)
- Spider-Man Team-Up #6 (1997)
- Spider-Man: The Lost Hunt #1–4 (2022)
- Spider-Man: The Lost Years #1–3 (1995)
- Spider-Woman #33 (1980)
- Star Trek #18 (1982)
- Star Wars #46 (1981)
- Strange Tales vol. 3 #1–2 (1998)
- Strange Tales: Dark Corners #1 (1998)
- Tales of the Marvel Universe #1 (1997)
- Valkyrie #1 (1997)
- Web of Spider-Man #31–32, 117 (1987–1994)
- Web of Spider-Man vol. 2 #1, 3, 5 (2009–2010)
- Webspinners: Tales of Spider-Man #1–3 (1999)
- X-Factor #92–104, Annual #9 (1993–1994)
- X-Men '95 #1 (1995)

===== Epic Comics =====
- Blood: A Tale #1–4 (1988)
- Moonshadow #1–12 (1985–1987)

== Filmography ==
=== Direct-to-video movies ===
- Deathstroke: Knights and Dragons (2020)
- Superman: Red Son (2020)
- Constantine: City of Demons (2018)
- Justice League Dark (2017)
- Batman: Bad Blood (2016)
- Batman vs. Robin (2015)

=== DC Showcase ===
- Death (2019)
- Adam Strange (2019)

=== Television ===
- Batman: Caped Crusader
  - The Spectral Hand
- Batman: The Brave and the Bold
  - "Day of the Dark Knight!"
  - "Hail the Tornado Tyrant!"
  - "Revenge of the Reach!"
  - "Scorn of the Star Sapphire!"
  - "Shadow of the Bat!"
  - "The Eyes of Despero!"
  - "The Last Patrol!"
  - "Time Out for Vengeance!"
- Be Cool Scooby-Doo!
  - "Me, Myself and A.I."
  - "Be Cold, Scooby-Doo"
  - "Giant Problems"
  - "Worst in Show"
  - "Greece is the Word"
- Ben 10: Ultimate Alien
  - "Ultimate Sacrifice"
- Earth: Final Conflict
  - "The Sleepers"
  - "Moonscape"
- Justice League Unlimited
  - "For the Man Who Has Everything"
  - "Shadow of the Hawk"
  - "The Return"
  - "Clash"
  - "The Ties That Bind"
  - "Ultimatum"
  - "Grudge Match"
- Legion of Super Heroes
  - "Cry Wolf"
  - "Dark Victory"
  - "Who Am I?"
- The Real Ghostbusters
  - "The Devil in the Deep"
- Spider-Man: The Animated Series
  - "The Mutant Agenda"
- Spider-Man
  - "Bring on the Bad Guys"
  - "The Road to Goblin War"
  - "Vengeance of Venom"
- Superboy
  - "Know Thine Enemy"
  - "Into the Mystery"
  - "To Be Human"
- Sym-Bionic Titan
  - "I Am Octus"
- Teen Titans Go!
  - "Artful Dodgers"
  - "No Power"
  - "The Mask"
- ThunderCats
  - "Survival of the Fittest"
  - "New Alliances"
  - "Song of the Petalars"
- The Twilight Zone
  - "The Girl I Married"

Preceded by Roger Stern	Captain America writer 1981	Succeeded by David Anthony Kraft
Preceded by David Anthony Kraft	Captain America writer 1982–1984	Succeeded by Mike Carlin
Preceded by n/a	Justice League International writer 1987–1992	Succeeded by Dan Jurgens
Preceded by Simon Jowett	Man-Thing writer 1997–1999	Succeeded by Hans Rodionoff
Preceded by David Michelinie	The Amazing Spider-Man writer 1994–1995	Succeeded by Tom DeFalco
Preceded by Scott Lobdell	X-Factor writer 1993–1994	Succeeded by Todd Dezago
Preceded by D. G. Chichester	Daredevil writer 1995–1996	Succeeded by Karl Kesel
