= Shar Levine =

Canadian writer

- Born: 1953 (age 72–73); Edmonton, Alberta
- Occupation: Author
- Writing career
- Genre: Children's Literature

Shar Levine, CM (born 1953) is a Canadian children's author, and designer.

== Career ==
Levine has written over 70 books and book/kits, primarily on hands-on science for children. For her work in science literacy and science promotion, was appointed to the 2016 Order of Canada. In 2015, she was recognized by the University of Alberta and received their Alumni Honour Award. Levine, and her co-author, Leslie Johnstone, were co-recipients of the Eve Savory Award for Science Communication from the BC Innovation Council (2006) and their book, Backyard Science, was a finalist for the Subaru Award, (hands on activity) from the American Association for the Advancement of Science, Science Books and Films (2005). The Ultimate Guide to Your Microscope was a finalist-2008 American Association for the Advancement of Science/Subaru Science Books and Films Prize Hands-On Science/Activity Books.

Levine, or Sciencelady as she is known professionally, frequently speaks at writer's festivals and at teacher/librarian conferences. Her science presentations at schools and libraries have been enjoyed by thousands of children.

== Fellowships ==
- 2011 (May 18–27) Marine Biological Lab, Woods Hole- Science Journalism Fellowship
- 2010 (Sept 12–18) Woods Hole, Mass- Woods Hole Oceanographic Institution -Science Journalism Fellowship
- 2010 (June 14–18) Boulder, Co. National Center for Atmospheric Research- Science Journalism Fellowship
- 2009 (May 18–22) Kauai, National Tropical Botanical Garden-Environmental Journalism Fellowship

== Awards ==
=== Book awards ===
- Projects for a Healthy Planet:
  - Canadian Children's Book Centre 1993 "Our Choice Award".
- The Paperbook and Papermaker:
  - Canadian Children's Book Centre 1994 "Our Choice Award".
  - Canadian Toy Testing Council - top recommendation.
  - National Parenting Publication Award (US) - 1994.
- Everyday Science:
  - Canadian Children's Book Centre 1995 "Our Choice Award".
- Science Around the World:
  - Canadian Children's Book Centre 1996 "Our Choice Award".
- The Microscope Book:
  - Canadian Children's Book Centre 1997 “Our Choice Award”.
- WormWorld:
  - National Parenting Publication Award (US) - 1997.
  - Parent's Choice Award- Bronze (US) - 1998.
- The Magnets Book:
  - Canadian Children's Book Centre 1998 “Our Choice Award”.
- Fun With Your Microscope:
  - Canadian Children's Book Centre 1998 “Our Choice Award, starred selection”.
- The Ultimate Balloon Book:
  - Canadian Children's Book Centre 2002 “Our Choice Award”.
- The Science of Sound and Music:
  - Canadian Children's Book Centre 2001 “Our Choice Award”.
- Backyard Science: finalist:
  - 2006 American Association for the Advancement of Science/Subaru Science Books and Films Prize (Hands -On Science/Activity) Books.
- the Ultimate Guide to Your Microscope: finalist:
  - 2008 American Association for the Advancement of Science/Subaru Science Books and Films Prize (Hands -On Science/Activity) Books.
- Plants: Flowering Plants, Ferns, Mosses and Other Plants:
  - CCBC Best Books, 2011
- Snowy Science:
  - OLA Best Bet
  - CCBC Best Books, 2012
- Hockey Science:
  - OLA Best Bet, 2012
  - CCBC Best Books, 2013
- Dirty Science:
  - Winner of Science in Society (Youth) Book Award, 2014
  - CCBC Best Books, 2014

== General awards ==
- Member of the Order of Canada, 2016
- Alumni Honour Award - University of Alberta, 2015
- Co-recipient Eve Savory Award for Science Communication 2006, BC Innovation Council.
- Playthings 1989, Merchandising Achievement, Award of Merit Department Design.
- Sea Festival Parade, 1989, Third Prize Commercial.

== Publications ==
=== List of books Shar Levine and Leslie Johnstone ===
- #Challenge, Scholastic, 2020
- Stinky Science, Smart Lab, 2018
- Crazy Drink Lab, Smart Lab, 2017
- Dirty Science, Scholastic Canada, 2013.
- Hockey Science, Scholastic Canada, 2012.
- Bathtub Science, HarperCollins Canada, enhanced Ebook, 2011.
- Snowy Science, Scholastic Canada, 2011.
- Scary Science, Scholastic Canada, 2010.
- In a Class of Their Own -Animals, Crabtree Publishing, Canada, 2010.
- In a Class of Their Own -Plants, Crabtree Publishing, Canada, 2010.
- USA Today, Weather Wonders, Sterling Publishing Ltd. New York, 2009.
- The Icky, Sticky and Gross Fascinating Factbook, Mud Puddle Books, New York.
- Smart Lab- Amazing Animal Challenge, becker&mayer! Bellevue, WA, 2008.
- Smart Lab- Extreme Secret Formula Lab, becker&mayer! Bellevue, WA, 2008.
- Super Smelly Lab, Scholastic Inc. New York, 2008.
- Ultimate Guide to Your Microscope, Sterling Publishing Ltd. New York, 2008.
- Volcano book and Kit, Mud Puddle, New York, 2007.
- Smart Lab- Human Body Challenge, becker&mayer!, Bellevue, WA, 2007.
- Smart Lab-Indoor Outdoor Microscope, becker&mayer!, Bellevue, WA, 2007.
- Superpower Microscope, becker&mayer!, Bellevue, WA, 2007.
- Volcano Book and Kit, Mudpuddle, New York, 2007.
- Ultimate Guide to Your Microscope, Sterling Publishing Co. Ltd. New York, 2007.
- Smart Lab-Secret Formula Lab, becker&mayer!, Bellevue, WA, 2006.
- Smart Lab- Science and Nature Challenge, becker&mayer!, Bellevue, WA, 2006.
- Smart Lab- Weird and Gross Challenge, becker&mayer!, Bellevue, WA, 2006.
- Sports Science, Sterling Publishing Co. Ltd., New York, 2006.
- First Science-The Amazing Human Body, Sterling Publishing Co. Ltd., New York, 2006.
- First Science- Magnet Power, Sterling Publishing Co. Ltd., New York, 2006.
- Stop Thief! Build Your Own Backpack Alarm, Scholastic Press, New York, 2006.
- Super Secret Formula Lab, Scholastic Press, New York, 2006.
- Secret Formula Lab: Smart Lab, becker & mayer! Bellevue, WA, 2006.
- Extreme 3-D Your Body, Silver Dolphin Books, San Diego, CA, 2005.
- Extreme 3-D Weird Animals, Silver Dolphin Books, San Diego, CA, 2005.
- Extreme 3-D Scary Bugs, Silver Dolphin Books, San Diego, CA, 2005.
- Backyard Science, Sterling Publishing Co. Ltd., New York, 2005.
- First Science Experiments with Nature, Senses, Weather and Machines, Sterling Pub. Co. Ltd., New York, 2005.
- Skyblades- becker&mayer! Bellevue, WA, 2004, (not released).
- Build Your Own Portable Doorbell, becker&mayer! Bellevue, WA, 2004, (not released).
- First Science-Mighty Machines, Sterling Publishing Co. Ltd., New York, 2004.
- First Science-Nifty Nature, Sterling Publishing Co. Ltd., New York, 2004.
- Kitchen Science, Sterling Publishing Co. Ltd., New York, 2003.
- The Ultimate Bubble Book, Sterling Publishing Co. Ltd., New York, 2003.
- First Science-Wonderful Weather, Sterling Publishing Co. Ltd., New York, 2003.
- First Science- Super Senses, Sterling Publishing Co. Ltd., New York, 2003.
- Build your own Spyscope, becker & mayer! Bellevue, WA, 2002.
- Build your own TV remote control, becker&mayer! Bellevue, WA, 2001.
- Incredible Ice Cream Machine, becker&mayer! Kirkland WA, 2001.
- The Incredible Secret Formula Book, becker & mayer!, Kirkland WA, Troll Communications, New York, 2001.
- Solar Oven, becker&mayer!, Kirkland WA, Scholastic, New York, 2000.
- Shocking Science, Sterling Publishing Co. Ltd., New York, 2000.
- Quick-but-great Science Fair Projects, Sterling Publishing Co. Ltd., New York, 2000.
- The Science of Sound and Music, Sterling Publishing Co. Ltd., New York, 2000.
- Blast Off, a Rocket Science kit and book, becker & mayer!, Kirkland WA, 2000.
- It's my world, you just live on it, becker & mayer!, Kirkland WA, 2000.
- Bath Tub Science, Sterling Publishing Co. Ltd., New York, 2000
- 3-D Lungs and Microtongues, Somerville House Books Ltd., Toronto, Penguin Putnam, New York, 1999.
- 3-D Bees and Microfleas, Somerville House Books Ltd., Toronto, Penguin Putnam, New York, 1999.
- The Mega Dome Chemistry Book, Wild Planet Toys, San Francisco, 1999.
- Gross Lab, Wild Planet Toys, San Francisco, 1999.
- Fun with your Microscope, Sterling Publishing Co. Ltd., New York, 1998.
- The Optics Book, Sterling Publishing Co. Ltd., New York, 1998.
- The Magnets Book, Sterling Publishing Co. Ltd., New York, 1997.
- Science Around the World, John Wiley and Sons, New York, 1996.
- The Microscope Book, Sterling Publishing Co. Ltd., New York, 1996.
- Silly Science, John Wiley and Sons, New York, 1995.
- Everyday Science, John Wiley and Sons, New York - winner of Canadian, 1995.

=== Books by Shar Levine ===
- Extreme Balloon Tying, Co-Author, Michael Ouchi, Sterling Publishing, New York, 2007.
- The Ultimate Balloon Book, Co-Author, Michael Ouchi, 2001, Sterling Publishing Co. Ltd., New York, 2001.
- Awesome Yo-Yo Tricks, Co-Author, Bob Bowden, Sterling Publishing Co. Ltd., New York, 2000.
- Marbles, A Player's Guide, Co-author, Vicki Scudamore, 1998, Sterling Publishing Co. Ltd., New York, 1998.
- WormWorld, the Worm Book, Somerville House, Toronto, 1997.
- Chocolate Lover's Cookbook, Co-author, Vicki Scudamore, 1997, Sterling Publishing, New York, 1997.
- The Paperbook and Papermaker, Somerville House, Toronto, 1993.
- Einstein's Science Parties, Co-Author, Allison Grafton, John Wiley and Sons, New York, 1993.
- Projects for a Healthy Planet, Co-author, Allison Grafton, John Wiley and Sons, New York, 1991.

=== Translations of books ===
- Le Labo Des Malins, Scholastic Canada, 2010
- Le Labo Sous Zero, Scholastic Canada, 2011
- The Ultimate Balloon Book (Russian), 2004.
- Dolle Knutselpret met Ballonnen. (The Ultimate Balloon Book) Deltas, Uitgeverij N.V. Aartselaar, Belgium, 2004.
- Creations originales avec des Ballons (The Ultimate Balloon Book). Chanteclerr, Paris, 2004.
- Pesta Sains ala Einstein (Einstein's Science Parties). Pakar Raya, Bandung, Indonesia, 2003.
- Ciencia Magica, Experimentos extranos y asombrosos, Albatros tusMaravillas, Buenos Aires, Argentina, (Spanish), 1998.
- Ciencia Con Todo, Experimentos simples con las cosas que nos rodean, Albatros tus Maravillas Hipolito, Buenos Aires, Argentina, (Spanish), 1997.
- Ecociencia- Experimentos ecologies para chicos, Albatros tus Maravillas (Buenos Aires, Argentina, (Spanish), 1997.
- Projectos para um Planeta Saudavel (Projects for a Healthy Planet). Editora Augustus, São Paulo-SP Brasil, (Portuguese), 1995.
- Projects for a Healthy Planet, (Korean), 1995.
