= PS Magazine =

US Army technical bulletins with comic book-style art

PS: The Preventive Maintenance Monthly
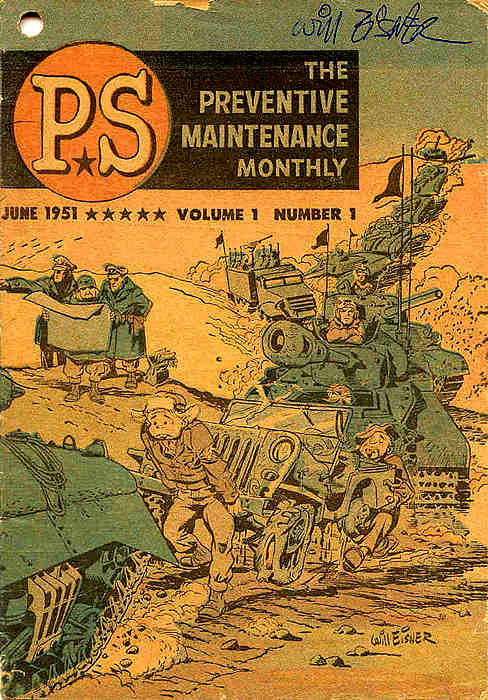
- Premiere issue of PS (June 1951). Art by Will Eisner.
- Categories: Preventive maintenance
- Frequency: Monthly
- Publisher: Department of the Army
- First issue: June 1951
- Country: United States
- Based in: Redstone Arsenal, Alabama
- Website: www.psmagazine.army.mil
- ISSN: 0475-2953

PS: The Preventive Maintenance Monthly, more commonly referred to as PS Magazine, was a series of United States Army pocket-sized bulletins published between June 1951 and November 2019 as a monthly magazine with comic book-style art to illustrate proper preventive maintenance methods, as well as proper supply procedures and related safety. The magazine's title is derived from it being a "postscript" to technical manuals and other published maintenance guidance. In March 1987, PS was officially designated as a technical bulletin (TB 43-PS-Series).

The magazine's history can be traced back to the similar publication Army Motors during World War II, which PS Magazine replaced in 1951. PS Magazine became well known for its use of recurring characters and anthropomorphic military equipment. Paper production of the magazine ended in 2017, though it continued in an online format. In January 2024, it was announced that PS Magazine would cease operations on September 30, 2024, after 73 years of publication.

== Origin – Army Motors magazine ==
The Army had experienced some degree of acceptance and success during World War II with the instructional publication Army Motors, for which Corporal Will Eisner, an established comic-book writer-artist-editor, had been appropriated to draw such characters as Beetle Bailey-like Private Joe Dope, Lauren Bacall look-alike and "by the book" Corporal Connie Rodd, and Master Sergeant Half-Mast McCanick. Eisner left the Army as a chief warrant officer to start American Visuals Corporation, a contract graphic art company. In response to a sudden need for maintenance instruction at the start of the Korean War, the Army contracted American Visuals Corporation to create instructional material, similar to Eisner's work on Army Motors for the Army Ordnance Corps's new publication, PS: The Preventive Maintenance Monthly, that replaced Army Motors in 1951.

== Production of PS ==
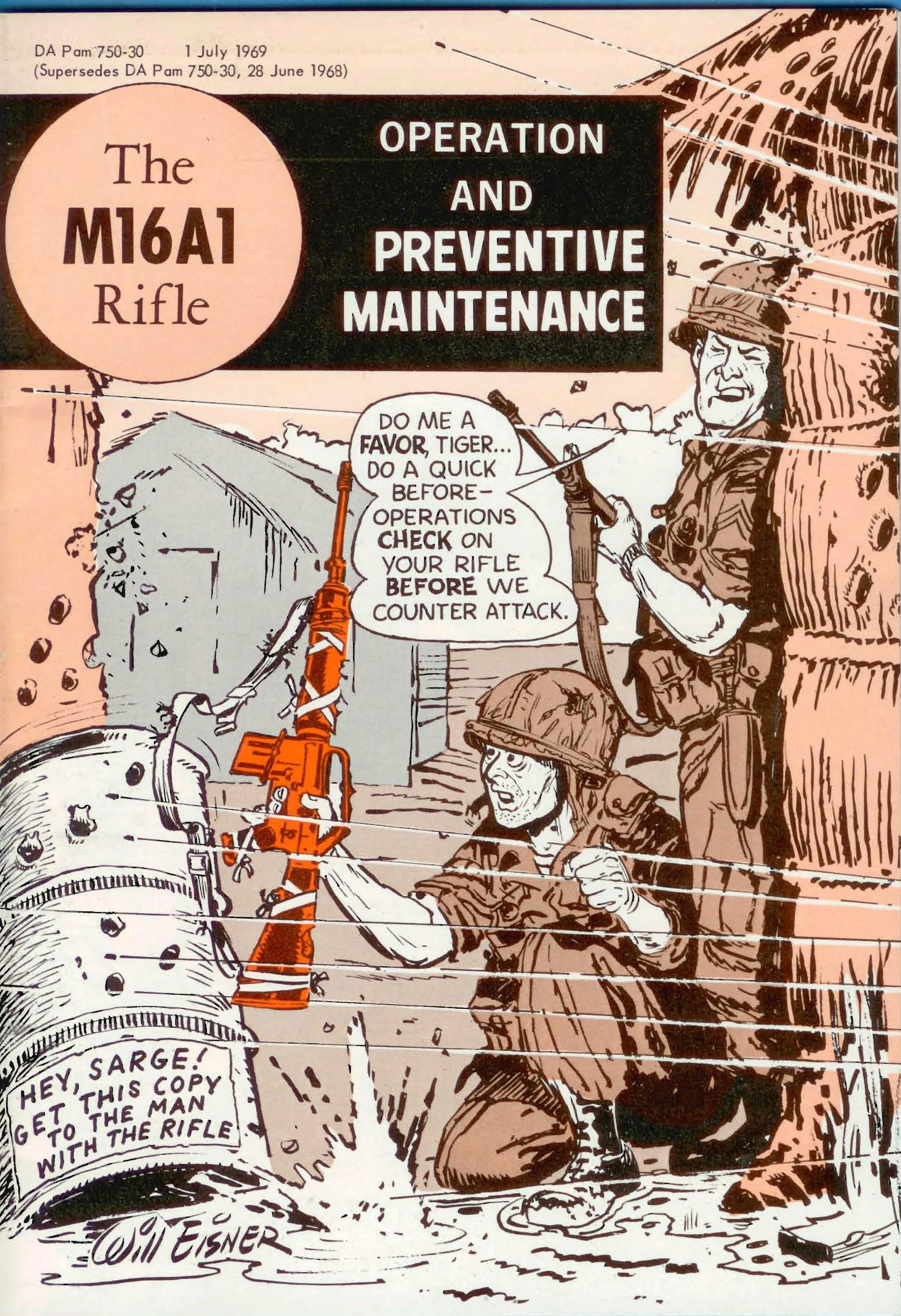
In 1968 and 1969, Eisner illustrated The M16A1 Rifle (DA PAM 750-30) as a standalone issue of PS specifically to address issues related to the then-new M16 rifle as it was fielded in Vietnam.

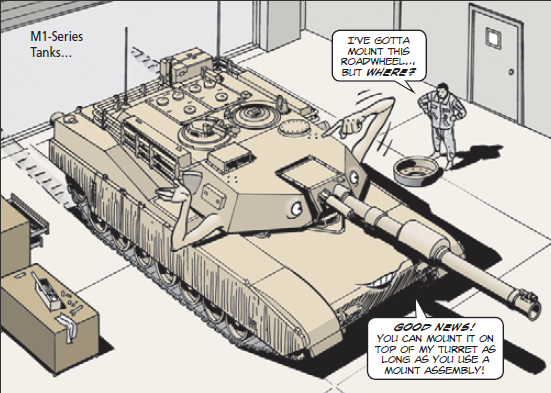
A typical PS illustration publicizing new information: M1 Abrams crewmen may now mount a roadwheel atop their anthropomorphic tank's turret, due to the availability of a new type of mounting assembly

Eisner was the publication's artistic director from its inception through the end of 1971. The magazine's artists have included Eisner, Murphy Anderson, Joe Kubert, Dan Spiegle, Scott Madsen, Malane Newman, Alfredo Alcala, and Mike Ploog. The magazine from its inception has been, written, researched and edited by Department of the Army civilians.

The magazine was published in digest size with 2-color spots and a four-color cover and continuity. The continuity consisted of a short story told through the use of a series of panels like any comic book, often with a theme borrowed from popular fiction. The home office of PS was located at Aberdeen Proving Ground, Maryland, from April 1951 until January 1955, when it was moved to Raritan Arsenal, New Jersey. It was moved again in October 1962 to Fort Knox, Kentucky. It remained there until July 1973, when it moved to the Lexington-Blue Grass Army Depot in Kentucky. In June 1993, it moved to Redstone Arsenal, Alabama. Paper production ended with the June 2017 issue; it is now in online format only.

Department of the Army pamphlets 750-30 (about the M16 rifle) and 750-31 (about the Gama Goat), as well as numerous posters including 750-78 (about the role of enlisted leadership in preventative maintenance), were also produced in the style of PS, in some cases using the same characters. The PS staff also helped to create foreign-language special editions, as well as special editions focused on topics like preventive maintenance in a desert environment. In 2023, a team of Ukrainian civilian volunteers began translating select PS Magazine articles to assist the Ukrainian armed forces maintain the fleets of U.S.-sourced vehicles and equipment donated by NATO and other partner nations.

== Characters ==
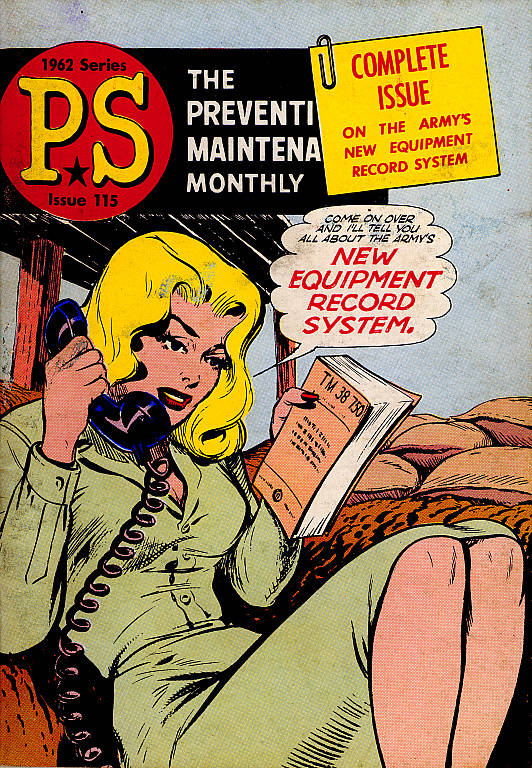
Character Connie Rodd on cover of PS issue 115, 1962

Master Sergeant Half-Mast and Connie Rodd (now a civilian) as well as Privates Dope and Fosgnoff were brought by Eisner from Army Motors. Dope and Fosgnoff served as cautionary tales while Half-Mast provided direct technical guidance. Following Army complaints about screw-ups Dope and Fosgnoff, both characters were permanently removed in 1955. As other combat support and combat service support elements joined the magazine, new characters were added to represent branch-specific issues: Master Sgt. Bull Dozer for the Engineers in 1954, Percy the Skunk for the Chemical Corps in 1960, Sgt. First Class Windy Windsock (and later Benjamin "Rotor" Blade) for Aviation in 1962, and Sgt. First Class Macon Sparks for the Signal Corps in 1977. To better serve a diversifying demographic in the military audience, in 1970 an African-American civilian woman, Bonnie, was added. A Hispanic Quartermaster sergeant, Sgt. First Class Pablo Hablo, was introduced in 1993 but was removed only five years later after being perceived as a racial stereotype. In 2001, Online Warrior was added to the PS line-up to communicate information about online resources. Online Warrior retired in 2010 and replaced by Cloe, who addressed issues related to communications and electronics more broadly.

From the 1950s to the 1970s, Connie and Bonnie were played up as two-dimensional pin-up models or "cheesecake", to entice mostly male GIs to read PS. Following an increased presence of women in the Army and at the urging of Congresswoman Bella Abzug, as well as Senators William Proxmire and Orrin Hatch, the magazine updated Connie and Bonnie in March 1980 to a more modest and professional form.

Sherry Steward has opined that the anthropomorphism of military equipment in the magazine helps the military audience "build serious relationships with technology... personified equipment often reflects emotions of anger, sadness, fear, and happiness to appeal to the reader's sense of responsibility." Through facial expressions, body language and dialogue, the anthropomorphized equipment reacts soldiers' activity, establishing empathy among those charged with maintenance of the Army's equipment.
