= Remy Charlip =

American artist and choreographer (1929–2012)

- Born: Abraham Remy Charlip; January 10, 1929; New York City, US
- Died: August 14, 2012 (aged 83); San Francisco, California, US
- Education: Cooper Union; Black Mountain College
- Occupations: Artist, writer, choreographer

Abraham Remy Charlip (January 10, 1929 – August 14, 2012) was an American artist, writer, choreographer, theatre director, theatrical designer, and teacher. He wrote or illustrated more than 40 children's books.

== Life and career ==
Charlip was raised in the Brownsville neighborhood of Brooklyn by Lithuanian Jewish parents.

He studied textile design at Straubenmuller Textile High School in Manhattan, and fine arts at Cooper Union in New York, graduating in 1949. In 1951, he began attending Black Mountain College in North Carolina at the encouragement of Lou Harrison, arriving on Thanksgiving 1951 together with composer David Tudor and writer and potter M.C. Richards. At Black Mountain College, he collaborated with composer John Cage, participated in Theatre Piece No. 1, and became a founding member of the Merce Cunningham Dance Company, for which he also designed sets and costumes. He remained a member of the Merce Cunningham Dance Company for 11 years. He also met others with whom he would later collaborate, including Robert Rauschenberg, Nicholas Cernovich, and Vera Baker Williams.

In the 1960s, Charlip created a unique form of choreography, which he called "Air Mail Dances". He would send a set of drawings to a dance company, and the dancers would then order the positions and create transitions and context, without Charlip's further participation.

He directed plays for the Judson Poets Theatre, co-founded the Paper Bag Players children's theater company, and served as head of the Children's Theater and Literature Department at Sarah Lawrence College. Off-Broadway, he was the "Stage Director" of a 1962 production of Bertolt Brecht's Man Is Man for Julian Beck's Living Theatre, for which he received his first of two Obie Awards, and designed the set for the American Place Theatre production of Paul Goodman's Jonah in 1966.

As a children's book illustrator and author, he became known for his unique use of line and color, fanciful prose, and postmodern use of narrative sequence and continuity. He won three New York Times Best Illustrated Book of the Year citations, and was awarded a six-month residency in Kyoto, Japan from the Japan/U.S. Commission on the Arts.

Charlip was the model for illustrations of Georges Méliès in the book The Invention of Hugo Cabret, written and illustrated by Brian Selznick.

He moved to San Francisco in 1989, and worked with local arts groups, including the Oakland Ballet. Towards the end of his life, Charlip was living as openly gay. He died in San Francisco in 2012.

== Choreography ==
- Meditation (solo, 1966)
- A Week's Notice (duet, 1977)
- Art of the Dance (solo, 1977)
- Travel Sketches (solo, 1977)
- Glow Worm (quartet, 1977)
- Dance in Bed (solo)
- April (Judson Dance Theatre)
- December (Judson Dance Theatre)

== Children's books ==
- 1956: Dress Up and Let's Have a Party. Scott.
- 1957: Where is Everybody?. Scott.
- 1957: It Looks Like Snow Greenwillow, reprint 2000, On Dirait Qu'il Neige
- 1962: The Tree Angel Knopf.
- 1964: Fortunately. Parents Magazine Press. Reprinted by Scholastic Book Services in 1969 with the Title What Good Luck! What Bad Luck!
- 1966: Mother, Mother, I Feel Sick, Send for the Doctor, Quick, Quick, Quick. Four Winds Press
- 1969: Arm in Arm (A Collection of Connections, Endless Tales, Reiterations, and other Echolalia). ISBN 0-590-07758-9.
- 1973: Harlequin and the Gift of Many Colors.
- 1975: Thirteen, with Jerry Joyner. Four Winds Press/MacMillan Publishing
- 1987: Handtalk Birthday Four Winds Press
- 1999: Peanut Butter Party. Tricycle Press.
- 1999: Sleepytime Rhyme. Tricycle Press. Greenwillow Books. ISBN 0-688-16271-1
- 2000: Why I Will Never Ever Ever Ever Have Enough Time to Read This Book. Tricycle Press.
- 2007: A Perfect Day. Greenwillow Books. ISBN 978-0-06-051972-8.
