= 1975 in comics =

Notable events of 1975 in comics.

== Events and publications ==
=== Year overall ===
- Following up their various Giant-Size series from 1974, Marvel Comics publishes a number of one-shot Giant-Size annuals, which feature reprints of "classic" Captain America, Captain Marvel, Daredevil, Doctor Strange, Hulk, Invaders, Iron Man, Power Man, and Thor stories. In addition, the company publishes three Giant-Size issues (January, April, and July cover dates) of Kid Colt, and two Giant-Size issues (May and June cover dates) of the reprint title Marvel Triple Action. On the other hand, the company cancels 10 Giant-Size titles, including Giant-Size Avengers, Giant-Size Conan, Giant-Size Defenders, Giant-Size Fantastic Four, Giant-Size Man-Thing, Giant-Size Master of Kung Fu, Giant-Size Spider-Man, Giant-Size Super-Villain Team-Up, Giant-Size Werewolf, and Giant-Size X-Men.
- The horror/suspense comic resurgence ends, as publishers cancel titles in droves. Marvel and its black-and-white magazines are particularly hard hit, canceling Adventure Into Fear, Dead of Night, Dracula Lives!, Giant-Size Chillers, Giant-Size Werewolf, Haunt of Horror, both Man-Thing titles, Masters of Terror, Monsters Unleashed, Supernatural Thrillers, Tales of the Zombie, Vampire Tales, and Where Monsters Dwell. DC Comics cancels Black Magic, Secrets of Haunted House, Tales of Ghost Castle, and Weird Mystery Tales. Gold Key Comics cancels Mystery Comics Digest, and Archie Comics even cancels their title Red Circle Sorcery.
- Newspaper strip Cecil C. Addle by Ray Collins begins publication

=== January ===
- January 8: in Le journal de Tintin, Dans l'enfer du safari by Jean Graton.
- January 20: The New Yorker publishes a strange comic strip by cartoonist George Booth, involving cave people with a strange vocabulary. Titled Ip Gissa Gul, it becomes a classic afterwards.
- January 23–26: Will Eisner is the first American to win the Grand Prix de la ville d'Angoulême at the annual Comics Festival of Angoulême.
- DC Comics raises the price of its typical comic book from 20 cents to 25 cents, keeping the page-count at 36.
- First issue of the French magazine Métàl Hurlant.
- L’ennemi by Derib (Le Lombard).
- Le fils de Spartacus by Jacques Martin (Csterman).
- In the Italian magazine alterlinus, Il caso Webber, by the Argentina Josè Munoz and Carlos Sampayo; debut of the private eye Alack Sinner.

=== February ===
- February 4: Cosey launches his comic series Jonathan in Tintin.
- The final issue of the Lucky Luke monthly magazine is published.

=== Spring ===
- DC Special (1968 series) is revived with issue #16; the title had ceased publishing in 1971. (DC Comics)
- Art Spiegelman, Diane Noomin and Bill Griffith establish the underground comix magazine Arcade.

=== March ===
- Adventure Comics #438: A "Seven Soldiers of Victory" script by Joseph Samachson written in the 1940s was serialized as a backup feature in Adventure Comics beginning with issue #438 and running through #443, with each chapter illustrated by a different artist including Dick Dillin, Howard Chaykin, Lee Elias, Mike Grell, Ernie Chan, and José Luis García-López.
- The vagabond of Limbo, by Christian Godard and Julio Ribera (Dargaud).
- in Italy, Potenza nera, by Giulio Bertoletti (Universo), first episode of a projected trilogy (Crist-031), rewriting the Book of Genesis in a Sci-fi key. The two following episodes never have been published.
- In alterlinus, Riflesso by Guido Crepax (Valentina series).
- Editoriale Corno launches two new magazines of Marvel comics: Conan e Kazar (15 March), with the comics not strictly of superheroes, and Hulk e I difensori (20 march.)

=== April ===
- April 1: The first issue of the French satirical comics magazine Fluide Glacial is published.
- April 1: The first episode of Moebius' Arzach is prepublished in Métal Hurlant.
- April 7: In Pif gadget, the super-hero child Supermatou by Jean-Claude Poirier and Le Furet, by Eduardo Teixeira Coelho and Jean Ollivier, a hero living in the France of Louis XI, make their debut.
- April 13: in Topolino, Paperino e le ventimila beghe sotto i mari (Donald and twenty thousand troubles under the seas) by Luciano Gatto and Massimo Marconi, parody of Jules Verne’s novel.
- April 21: first issue of the anthological magazine Lanciostory (Editoriale Aurea); it introduces in Italy the Argentina comics.
- Detective Comics, with issue #446, resumes a monthly schedule, after going bi-monthly in June/July 1973. (DC Comics)
- Asterix and the great crossing by Goscinny and Uderzo (Dargaud); the story was prepublished in the newspaper Sud-Ouest.
- Valentina nel metrò by Guido Crepax, is serialized In Corriere d'Informazione, the afternoon edition of Corriere della sera,

=== May ===
- May 25: In Il Corriere dei ragazzi, two new series make their debut: the humoristic La contea di Colbrino, by Adriano Carnivali, set in a parodic Renaissance Italy, and the adventurous Lord Shark, by Mino Milani and Giancarlo Alessandrini, set in colonial India.
- May 25: n the Corriere dei piccoli, Gennarino Tarantella by Carlo Squillante makes his debut. It is the last "mute" comic made according to the traditional formula of the magazine, with rhymed captions instead of the balloons.
- Giant-Size X-Men #1, written by Len Wein and illustrated by Dave Cockrum (Marvel Comics). First appearance of the new X-Men Colossus, Storm, Nightcrawler, and Thunderbird
- In Disney Magazine #1, The Case of the Pea Soup Burglaries, by Carl Fallberg and Al Hubbard, first chapter of the saga Mickey and the Sleuth.
- In Pilote Magazine, Ambassador of the shadows, by Pierre Christin and Jean-Claude Mezieres.
- Fist issue of the series Daniel by Max Bunker and Frank Verola (Editoriale Corno); its hero is a vigilante working upon the identity of a policeman who died to save his life.

=== June ===
- June 23: in Le nouvel Observateur, the first chapter of La Guérison des Dalton by Goscinny and Morris is prepublished.
- First issue of Mister No (Sergio Bonelli Editore) by Guido Nolitta and Gallieno Ferri.

=== July ===
- July 1: in Le journal de Tintin, Le secret de Steve Warson by Jean Graton.
- July 13: in Corriere dei Piccoli, debut of Pimpa, by Francesco Tullio-Altan.
- July 26: in the Spanish magazine Mortadelo, Los mercenaries by Ibanez (Editorial Bruguera)
- Canadian publisher Comely Comix, based in Winnipeg, Manitoba, debuts with Captain Canuck #1.
- The Buyer's Guide to Comics Fandom switches to weekly publication.
- Poche ore all’alba (A few hours at dawn) by Magnus (Edizioni del Vascello), first album of the series Lo sconosciuto.

=== August ===
- August 4: in Lanciostory, the western series Alamo Kid, by Anthony Mancuso and Giuseppe Montanari, makes its debut.
- August 13: In Charles M. Schulz' Peanuts Spike, brother of Snoopy, makes his debut.
- August 16: Jean-Pierre Girerd's On à Volé la Coupe Stanley is serialized in La Presse. The story will run until 19 June 1976.
- Uncanny X-Men #94 — first issue of title featuring the new X-Men. Written by Chris Claremont; he will write the title continuously for the next 17 years.
- In Italy, first issue of La pantera rosa (The Pink panther) (Cenisio)

=== Fall ===
- Atlas/Seaboard Comics folds, after parts of two years in business, having published 23 comics titles and five comics magazines.

=== September ===
- September 12: Patty Klein and Jan Steeman's Noortje makes its debut in the Dutch girls' magazine Tina. It will run for 41 years, becoming the longest-running Dutch comic strip by the same creative team.
- September 14: in Corriere dei ragazzi, debut of Altai & Johnson, by Tiziano Sclavi and Giorgio Cavazzano, two private eyes, heroes of semiserious detective stories.
- September 16 : in Nouveau Tintin, Angel Face by Jean-Michel Charlier and Jean Giraud.
- Fist issue of Batman family (DC comics)
- The first issue of the Dutch alternative comics magazine De Vrije Balloen is published.

=== October ===
- October 3: The final issues Dutch comics magazines Sjors and Pep are published and both are merged into a new magazine which is first published on this date: Eppo. In 1985 it changes its name to Eppo Wordt Vervolgd, to tie in with the popular TV show Wordt Vervolgd about comics and cartoons.
- October 4: First strip of Inside Woody Allen, by Stuart Hample.
- October 13 The first issue of the German children's comics magazine Yps is published and will run until 10 October 2000. It will be relaunched on 11 October 2012 as an adult magazine.
- October 24: The Nero story De Groene Gravin by Marc Sleen begins publication in the newspapers and introduces Clo-Clo, the moustached son of Madam Pheip and Meneer Pheip.
- October 26: first strip of Crock, by Bill Rechin and Brant Parker.
- Marvel debuts three new ongoing titles, The Champions, The Inhumans, and Marvel Presents. Simultaneously, it cancels six ongoing titles: Giant-Size Fantastic Four, Man-Thing, Outlaw Kid (vol. 2), Supernatural Thrillers, War is Hell, and Where Monsters Dwell.
- In Pif Gadget, the crime series Sandberg pere et fils by Patrick Cothias and Alfonso Font (6 October) and the western one Capitaine Apache, by Roger Lécureux and Norma (13 October) make their debut.
- Diario di Valentina (Valentina’s diary) by Guido Crepax (Milano libri). It includes five reprints and an unpublished summary story (Vita privata).

=== November ===
- November 13: Belgian comic artist Marc Sleen is honored with the Golden Cross of Officer in the Brabant Order of Merit.
- Skartaris introduced in 1st Issue Special #8. (DC Comics)
- Korak, Son of Tarzan, with issue #60, changes its name to Tarzan Family. (DC Comics)

=== December ===
- December 28: In the Italian Disney magazine Topolino 1048, Ellsworth's Ornery Orphan by Romano Scarpa, Ellroy, the adoptive son of Ellsworth makes his debut.
- December 28: in Corriere dei piccoli, debut of the didactic comics for children Piero, Patti e Passatù, by Enrico Bagnoli.
- Secrets of Haunted House, with issue #5 (December 1975/January 1976 cover date), goes on hiatus (DC Comics).
- In Almanacco Topolino, more specifically the story Paperino e il piccolo Krak by Marco Rota and Gaudenzio Cappelli, Andold Wild Duck makes his debut.

=== Specific date unknown ===
- Costa Rican artist Carlos Alvarado Salazar creates Carlos Pincel.
- Maurice Tillieux and Jijé receive the Stripschapprijs.
- James McQuade's Honey Hooker makes its debut in Hustler.
- In Argentina, Carlos Trillo makes his debut as comics’ writer. He publishes in the magazine Mengano the noir series Un tal Daneri, drawn by Alberto Breccia, and in the newspaper Clarin the adventures of the journalist Loco Chavez, drawn by Horacio Altuna.

== Deaths ==
=== January ===
- January 4: Bob Montana, American comics artist (Archie Comics), dies at age 54 of a heart attack.
- January 19: Marino Benejam Ferrer, Spanish comics artist (La Familia Ulises, Morcillón y Babalí, Los Grandes Inventos de TBO), dies at age 84.

=== February ===
- February 9: Blanche Dumoulin, aka Davine, Belgian comics artist and writer (Spirou, Les Aventures de Zizette), dies from cancer at age 80.
- February 20: Artie Simek, American comics letterer (Marvel Comics), dies at age 59.
- February 28: Robert Lips, Swiss comics artist (Globi), dies at age 62.

=== March ===
- March 2: Salvador Mestres, Spanish animator and comics artist (Tom Relámpango, El Tresoro Maldito, Mae Blond la Mujer Fantasma, El Héroe Público No. 1 contra el Enemigo Público No. 1, Gong!, Guerra en la Estratosfera), dies at age 64 or 65.

=== April ===
- April 3: Otto Soglow, American comics artist (The Little King), dies at age 74.
- April 11: Huibert Vet, Dutch illustrator and comics artist, dies at age 55.
- April 19: Jim Navoni, American comics artist (continued Have You Seen Alonso?), dies at age 87.

=== May ===
- May 1: José Peñarroya, Spanish comics artist (Don Pío, Calixto, Gordito Relleno, Don Berrinche, Pedrusco Brutote, La Familia Pi, Floripondia Piripi, Viborita, Pepe, el Hincha, Don José Calmoso, Pitagorín), dies at age 64 or 65.
- May 8: George Baker, American comics artist (The Sad Sack), dies at age 59.
- May 10: Walt Spouse, American comic artist (The Wonderland of Oz), dies at age 81.
- May 25: Pal Korcsmaros, Hungarian journalist, illustrator and comic artist (comics based on literary classics), dies at age 61.

=== June ===
- June 3: Victor Dancette, French playwright and comics writer (La Bête est Morte), dies at age 74.
- June 25: Gus Schrotter, Austrian-American comic artist and illustrator (Dan'l Flannel), dies at age 74.

=== July ===
- July 11: Crockett Johnson, American comics artist (Barnaby) and illustrator (Harold and the Purple Crayon), dies at age 68.
- July 18: Vaughn Bodé, American comics artist (Cheech Wizard, Cobalt 60), dies of autoerotic asphyxiation at age 33.
- July 22: Jim Gary, American comics artist (G-Men, assisted on King of the Royal Mounted, Red Ryder), dies at age 70.

=== August ===
- August 5: Bob Karp, American comics writer (The Donald Duck newspaper comic), dies at age 64.
- August 6: Horacio Rodríguez Suría, Cuban comics artist (Bola de Nieve, Mango Macho y Cascarita, Pelusa y Pimienta, El Profesor Timbeque), dies at age 73.
- August 13:
  - Thornton Fisher, American comics artist (The Wishing Wisp, The Marrying of Mary), dies at age 87.
  - Ogden Whitney, American comic artist (Herbie Popnecker, worked on Skyman), dies at age 56.
- August 17: René Bastard, French comics artist (Yves Le Loup), dies at age 74.
- August 22: Lancelot Hogben, British experimental zoologist and medical statistician (author of From Cave Paintings to Comic Strip: A Kaleidoscope of Human Communication), dies at age 79.

=== September ===
- September 15: Carlos Conti, Spanish comics writer (Felipe Gafe, Superlópez), and artist (El Loco Carioco, Apolino Tarúguez, hombre de negocios, Mi tío Magdaleno, La vida adormilada de Morfeo Pérez, Don Fisgón, Don Alirón, El doctor No y su ayudante Sí), dies at age 59.

=== October ===
- October 2: Ton van Tast, Dutch illustrator, caricaturist, painter, lithographer and comics artist (De Daverende Dingen Dezer Dagen), dies at age 91.
- October 26: Asmo Alho, Finnish comics artist (Kieku ja Kaiku), dies at age 72.

=== November ===
- November 1: Mel Graff, American comics writer and artist (The Adventures of Patsy, assisted on Secret Agent X-9, continued Wash Tubbs and Captain Easy), dies at age 67 or 68.
- November 2: Ted McCall, Canadian journalist and comics writer (Royal Mounted, Robin Hood & Company, Freelance), dies at age 73.
- November 5: Sigurd Lybeck, Norwegian writer and comics writer (Jens von Bustenskjold), dies at age 80.

=== December ===
- December 13: John Millar Watt, British comics artist (Pop), dies at age 80.
- December 14: Ben Thompson, American comics artist (Listen to This One, The Masked Marvel, Hydroman, Rainbow Boy, The Music Master), dies at age 69.
- December 18: Ray Bailey, American animator and comics artist (Vesta West, Bruce Gentry, Space Cadet Tom Corbett), dies at age 62.
- December 24: Harold Mack, British animator and comics artist (Les Aventures des Deux Barbus), dies at the age 67.

=== Specific date unknown ===
- Arturo Lanteri, Argentine comics artist and film director (Les Aventuras de Negro Raúl, Don Pancho Talero, Anacleto), dies at age 93 or 94.
- Sergej Solovjev, Russian-Serbian comics artist dies at age 73 or 74.

== Exhibitions and shows ==
- 18 Oct–2 Nov: Institute of Contemporary Arts (London, England, U.K.) — "Marvel: Exhibition of Original Marvel Comics Art Work"

== Conventions ==
=== Europe ===
- April 26: Manchester comic convention (Manchester, UK) — affectionately known as "Man-Con"
- August 2–3: Comicon '75 (British Comic Art Convention) (Regent Centre Hotel, London, England) — organized by Rob Barrow; guests include Frank Hampson and Paul Neary
- October 29–November 2: Salone Internazionale dei Comics (Lucca, Italy) — 11th edition of the festival

=== North America ===
- Cosmicon IV (York University Winters College, Toronto, Ontario, Canada) — final iteration of this multi-genre convention; official guests include Bernie Wrightson, Howard Chaykin, Joe Staton, Tom Sutton, Ralph Reese, Jeff Jones, Johnny Craig, Vincent Marchesano, Scott Edelman, and Marv Wolfman
- Ohiocon '75 (Youngstown, Ohio) — program booklet, edited by Joe Zabel, includes a history of the Youngstown Comic Art Association
- Pittcon '75 (Pittsburgh, Pennsylvania)
- January: Cincinnati Comic Convention (Netherland Hilton, Cincinnati, Ohio) — first annual show, produced by comics retailer the Yellow Kid Comics Shoppe
- March: Mid-America Comic Convention (Holiday Inn, Cincinnati, Ohio) — sponsored by Northern Kentucky's only comic book shop, the Northern Kentucky Bookstore
- March 22–24: Mighty Marvel Comicon (Hotel Commodore, New York) — first annual show, produced by Marvel Comics
- Summer: Nostalgia '75, fourth annual Chicago Comic and Nostalgia Convention (Chicago, Illinois) — produced by Nancy Warner
- June 19–22: Multicon '75 (Oklahoma City, Oklahoma) — produced by OAF (Oklahoma Alliance of Fans); guests include George Takei, George Pal, Spanky McFarland, Bret Morrison, Jim Bannon, Al Williamson, and Steve Barrington
- June 25–29: Houstoncon '75 (Royal Coach Inn, Houston, Texas) — merged with the Houston Star Trek convention; guests include C. C. Beck, George Takei, Jock Mahoney, John Wooley, and Don "Red" Barry (Beck and Barry serve as judges for the costume contest)
- July 3–7: Comic Art Convention (Hotel Commodore, New York City)
- July 30 – August 3: San Diego Comic-Con (El Cortez Hotel, San Diego, California) — 1,100 attendees; official guests: Robert Bloch, Will Eisner, Mark Evanier, Gil Kane, Jack Katz, Stan Lee, Dick Moores, Chuck Norris, Don Rico, Jerry Siegel, Jim Starlin, Jim Steranko, and Theodore Sturgeon
- August: Cleveland Comic Convention ("Cleveland Comix Convention") (Sheraton Hotel, Cleveland, Ohio) — produced by Vladimir Swyrinsky; guests include Tony Isabella
- August 1–3: Toronto Triple Fan Fair a.k.a. "Fan Fair 3" (King Edward Hotel, Toronto, Ontario, Canada) — Guests of Honour: Lester del Rey and Cy Chauvin; 600 attendees
- August 22–24: Atlanta Comics & Fantasy Fair (Ramada Inn, Atlanta, Georgia) — first iteration of this event; official guests include Stan Lee, Kenneth Smith, and collector Mike Curtis
- September: OrlandoCon '75 (Orlando, Florida) — guests include Harvey Kurtzman, Burne Hogarth, Roy Crane, and Hal Foster
- Fall/Winter: Lancaster Comic Art Convention (Lancaster, Pennsylvania) — produced by Chuck Miller and Charlie Roberts; guests include Jim Steranko
- November 7–9: Famous Monsters Convention (Commodore Hotel, New York City) — guests include James Warren, Forrest J Ackerman, Peter Cushing, Verne Langdon, Ingrid Pitt, and Barbara Leigh
- December 18–21: MiamiCon I (Americana Hotel, Miami Beach, Florida) — 3,000 attendees; guests include Stan Lee, Jack Kirby, Neal Adams, C. C. Beck, James Doohan; admission price: $3.50

== Awards ==
=== National Cartoonists Society Division Awards ===
- Newspaper Comic Strips (Humor): Broom-Hilda, by Russell Myers
- Newspaper Comic Strips (Story): Brenda Starr, Reporter, by Dale Messick
- Newspaper Panel Cartoons: The Lockhorns, by Bill Hoest
- Animation: Isadore Klein
- Gag Cartoons: George Wolfe
- Humor Comic Books: Hy Eisman
- Story Comic Books: Gil Kane
- Advertising and Illustration: Burne Hogarth
- Editorial Cartoons: John Pierotti
- Sports Cartoons: Bruce Stark
- Special Features: Snappy Answers to Stupid Questions, by Al Jaffe
- Reuben Award: They'll Do It Every Time, by Bob Dunn

== First issues by title ==
=== DC Comics ===
Batman Family

Release: September /October Editor: Julius Schwartz.

Beowulf

Release: April /May. Writer: Michael Uslan. Artist: Ricardo Villamonte.

Claw the Unconquered

Release: May/June. Writer: David Michelinie. Artist: Ernie Chua.

First Issue Special

Release: April. Writer/Artist: Jack Kirby.

Hercules Unbound

Release: October /November Writer: Gerry Conway. Artists: José Luis García-López and Wally Wood.

The Joker: arguably the first regular series to feature a villain.

Release: May. Writer: Dennis O'Neil. Artist: Irv Novick and Dick Giordano.

Justice, Inc.

Release: May/June. Writer: Dennis O'Neil. Artist: Al McWilliams.

Kong the Untamed

Release: June/July. Writer: Jack Oleck. Artist: Alfredo Alcala.

Man-Bat

Release: December 1975/January 1976. Writer: Gerry Conway. Artists: Steve Ditko and Al Milgrom.

Richard Dragon, Kung Fu Fighter

Release: April /May. Writer: Jim Dennis. Artist: Leo Duranona.

Secrets of Haunted House

Release: April /May. Editor: Joe Orlando.

Sherlock Holmes

Release: September /October Writers: Denny O'Neil (adaptation) and Arthur Conan Doyle (original story). Artists: E.R. Cruz.

Stalker

Release: June/July. Writer: Paul Levitz. Artist: Steve Ditko.

Super-Team Family

Release: October/November Editor: Gerry Conway.

Tales of Ghost Castle

Release: May/June Editor: Tex Blaisdell.

Tor: first DC issue, featuring reprints of a Kubert character created in 1953.

Release: May/June Writer/Artist: Joe Kubert.

=== Marvel Comics ===
The Champions

Release: October. Writer: Tony Isabella. Artists: Don Heck and Mike Esposito.

Doc Savage: Man of Bronze

Release: August by Curtis Magazines. Writer: Doug Moench. Artists: John Buscema and Tony DeZuniga.

Giant-Size Chillers

Release: February.

Giant-Size Super-Villain Team-Up

Release: March. Editor: Roy Thomas.

Giant-Size X-Men

Release: May. Writer: Len Wein. Artist: Dave Cockrum.

The Inhumans

Release: October. Writer: Doug Moench. Artists: George Pérez and Frank Chiaramonte.

The Invaders

Release: August. Writer: Roy Thomas. Artists: Frank Robbins and Vince Colletta.

Kull and the Barbarians

Release: May by Curtis Magazines. Writer/Editor: Roy Thomas.

Marvel Feature vol. 2

Release: November. Editor: Roy Thomas.

Marvel Presents

Release: October. Writer: John Warner. Artists: Mike Vosburg, Pat Boyette, and Bob McLeod.

Marvel Preview

Release: Winter by Magazine Management/Curtis Magazines. Editor: Roy Thomas.

Masters of Terror

Release: July by Curtis Magazines. Editor: Tony Isabella.

Skull the Slayer

Release: August. Writer: Marv Wolfman. Artist: Steve Gan.

Super-Villain Team-Up

Release: August. Writer: Tony Isabella.

Unknown Worlds of Science Fiction

Release: January by Magazine Management/Curtis Magazines. Editor: Roy Thomas.

=== Other publishers ===
Arcade

Release: Spring by The Print Mint. Editors: Art Spiegelman and Bill Griffith.

Arzach

Artist/Writer: Jean Giraud.

Battle Picture Weekly

Release: March 8 by IPC Magazines. Editor: Pat Mills.

Big Apple Comix

Release: by Big Apple Productions. Editor: Flo Steinberg.

Captain Canuck

Release: July by Comely Comix. Writer/Artist: Richard Comely.

The Demon Hunter
Release: September by Atlas/Seaboard Comics. Writer: David Anthony Kraft Artist: Rich Buckler

Doomsday + 1

Release: July by Charlton Comics. Writer: Joe Gill. Artist: John Byrne.

Scary Tales

Release: August by Charlton Comics. Editor: George Wildman.

Zombie Hunter

Release: May by Kadokawa Shoten. Writer: Kazumasa Hirai. Artist: Yang Kyung-il

== Canceled titles ==
=== DC Comics ===
- Black Magic, with issue #9 (April /May)
- Justice, Inc., with issue #4 (November /December )
- Rima, the Jungle Girl, with issue #7 (April /May)
- The Sandman, with issue #6 (December 1975/January 1976)
- Sherlock Holmes, with issue #1 (September )
- Stalker, with issue #4 (December 1975/January 1976)
- Tales of Ghost Castle, with issue #3 (September /October ).
- Young Romance, with issue #208 (November /December ) — generally considered the first romance comic
- Weird Mystery Tales, with issue #24 (November )

=== Marvel Comics ===
- Adventure into Fear, with issue #31 (December )
- Dead of Night, with issue #11 (August )
- The Frankenstein Monster, with issue #18 (September )
- Giant-Size Avengers, with issue #5 (December )
- Giant-Size Chillers, with issue #3 (August )
- Giant-Size Conan, with issue #5 (Fall)
- Giant-Size Defenders, with issue #5 (July)
- Giant-Size Fantastic Four, with issue #6 (October)
- Giant-Size Man-Thing, with issue #5 (August )
- Giant-Size Master of Kung Fu, with issue #4 (June)
- Giant-Size Spider-Man, with issue #6 (Fall)
- Giant-Size Super-Villain Team-Up, with issue #2 (June)
- Giant-Size Werewolf, with issue #5 (July)
- Giant-Size X-Men, with issue #2 (Fall) — reprinted "classic" Roy Thomas/Neal Adams X-Men stories
- Man-Thing, with issue #22 (October )
- Outlaw Kid (vol. 2), with issue #30 (October )
- Supernatural Thrillers, with issue #15 (October )
- Unknown Worlds of Science Fiction, with issue #6 (November )
- War is Hell, with issue #15 (October )
- Western Gunfighters (1970 series), with issue #33 (November )
- Where Monsters Dwell, with issue #38 (October )

==== Curtis Magazines ====
- Dracula Lives!, with issue #13 (July)
- Haunt of Horror, with issue #5 (January )
- Kull and the Barbarians, with issue #3 (September )
- Masters of Terror, with issue #2 (September )
- Monsters Unleashed, with issue #11 (April )
- Savage Tales, with issue #11 (July)
- Tales of the Zombie, with issue #10 (March )
- Vampire Tales, with issue #11 (June)

=== Other publishers ===
- E-Man vol. 1, with issue #10 (Charlton, September )
- Mystery Comics Digest, with issue #26 (Gold Key, October )
- Red Circle Sorcery, with issue #11 (Red Circle Comics/Archie Comics, February )

== Initial appearance by character name ==
=== DC Comics ===
- Atlas, in 1st Issue Special #01 (April)
- Bronze Tiger, in Richard Dragon, Kung Fu Fighter #01 (April /May)
- Claw the Unconquered, in Claw the Unconquered #01 (June)
- Deimos, in 1st Issue Special #08 (November)
- Dingbats of Danger Street, in 1st Issue Special #06 (September)
- Esper Lass, in Superboy Starring the Legion of Super-Heroes #212 (October)
- Richard Dragon, in Richard Dragon, Kung Fu Fighter #01 (April /May)
- Golden Eagle, in Justice League of America #116 (March)
- Green Team: Boy Millionaires, in 1st Issue Special #02 (May)
- Kong the Untamed, in Kong the Untamed #01 (June/July)
- Lady Cop, in 1st Issue Special #04 (July)
- Lady Shiva, in Richard Dragon, Kung Fu Fighter #05 (December)
- Lucien, in Weird Mystery Tales #18 (May)
- Mark Shaw, in 1st Issue Special #05 (August)
- Sterling Silversmith, in Detective Comics #446 (April)
- Warlord, in 1st Issue Special #08 (November)

=== Marvel Comics ===
- Vance Astrovik, in Giant-Size Defenders #5 (July)
- Janice Foswell, in Marvel Team-Up #39 (November)
- Gloria Grant, in The Amazing Spider-Man #140 (January)
- Harold H. Harold, in Tomb of Dracula #37 (October)
- Korvac, in Giant-Size Defenders #3 (January)
- Stephen Lang, in X-Men #96 (December)
- Moira MacTaggert, in X-Men #96 (December)
- Jamie Madrox, in Giant-Size Fantastic Four #4 (February)
- Master Man, in Giant-Size Invaders #1
- Moon Knight, in Werewolf by Night #32 (August)
- Moses Magnum, in Giant-Size Spider-Man #4 (April)
- Nova, in Fantastic Four #164 (November)
- Illyana Rasputin, in Giant-Size X-Men #1 (May)
- Razor Fist (William Young), in Master of Kung Fu #29 (June)
- Ben Reilly, in The Amazing Spider-Man #149 (October)
- Shroud, in Super-Villain Team-Up #5 (April)
- Straw Man, in Dead of Night #11 (August)
- U-Man, in Invaders #3 (November)
- White Tiger, in Deadly Hands of Kung Fu #19 (December)
- new X-Men, in Giant-Size X-Men #1 (May)
  - Colossus
  - Nightcrawler
  - Storm
  - Thunderbird

=== Other publishers ===
- Captain Canuck, in Captain Canuck #1 (July)
