= List of fantasy comics =

This is a list of fantasy comics, consisting of comics whose fantasy content comprise a significant portion of the total content.

== Comic books ==
- A Game of Thrones
- Advanced Dungeons & Dragons
- Amethyst, Princess of Gemworld
- Arak, Son of Thunder
- Arion, Lord of Atlantis
- Arrowsmith
- Artesia
- Atlas
- Battle Chasers
- Beowulf
- Berona's War
- Bone
- The Books of Magic
- Brath
- Camelot 3000
- Castle Waiting
- Cavewoman (comics)
- Cerebus the Aardvark
- The Chronicles of Corum
- Claw the Unconquered
- Conan (Marvel)
- Conan (Dark Horse)
- Conan the Adventurer
- Conan the Barbarian
- The Dark Tower
- Dark Wraith of Shannara
- Death Dealer
- Demon Knights
- The DemonWars Saga
- Dragonlance
- Dragonslayer
- The Dreaming
- Dungeon
- Dungeon Siege: The Battle for Aranna
- Dungeons & Dragons
- El Mercenario
- Elfquest
- Elric
- Epic Illustrated
- Fables
- Fafhrd and the Gray Mouser
- Finieous Fingers
- Forge of War
- Forgotten Realms
- Gargoyles
- God Is Dead
- God of War (DC Comics)
- God of War (Dark Horse Comics)
- Graphic Myths and Legends
- Grimm Fairy Tales
- Groo the Wanderer
- He-Man and the Masters of the Universe
- Heavy Metal
- The History of the Runestaff
- The Hobbit
- Ironwood
- Kill Shakespeare
- Kull of Atlantis
- Lady Death
- Little Nemo in Slumberland
- Meridian
- Michael Moorcock's Multiverse
- Monster Allergy
- Mouse Guard
- Mystic
- The New Brighton Archeological Society
- Orcs: Forged for War
- Poison Elves
- Prince Valiant
- Purgatori
- Rat Queens
- Record of the Lodoss War
- Red Sonja
- Redwall
- Rokkin
- The Saga of Crystar
- Sandman
- Savage Sword of Conan
- Savage Tales
- Scion
- Sisterhood of Steel
- Sláine
- Sleepless
- The Smurfs
- Sojourn
- Solomon Kane
- Spelljammer
- Stalker
- Starchild
- Starfire
- Sword of Sorcery
- The Swords of Heaven, the Flowers of Hell
- Tarot: Witch of the Black Rose
- Tellos
- Thorgal
- Thrud the Barbarian
- Tor
- Valda the Iron Maiden
- Vampirella
- Warlord
- Weirdworld
- The Wicked + The Divine
- W.I.T.C.H.
- Wolfskin
- World of Warcraft
- Wormy
- Xena: Warrior Princess

== Webcomics ==
- Basileus
- Cucumber Quest
- Digger
- The Dreamland Chronicles
- Earthsong
- Goblins
- Gunnerkrigg Court
- Inverloch
- The Meek
- Nimona
- Order of the Stick
- The Phoenix Requiem
- Pibgorn
- Rogues of Clwyd-Rhan
- Sleepless Domain
