= Tales of Ghost Castle =

- Tales of Ghost Castle #1 (May/June 1975). Art by Ernie Chan.

Publication information
- Publisher: DC Comics
- Schedule: Bimonthly
- Format: Ongoing series
- Genre: Horror
- Publication date: May/June 1975-Sept./Oct. 1975
- No. of issues: 3
- Main characters: Lucien

Creative team
- Written by: Sergio Aragonés, Robert Kanigher, Paul Levitz, David Michelinie, Jack Oleck, Martin Pasko, Mal Warwick
- Artist(s): Sergio Aragonés, Ernie Chan, E. R. Cruz, Bill Draut, Buddy Gernale, Alex Niño, Frank "Quico" Redondo, Nestor Redondo, Ruben Yandoc
- Editor: Tex Blaisdell

Tales of Ghost Castle was a horror-suspense anthology comic book series published by DC Comics in 1975. Tales of Ghost Castle was "hosted" by Lucien, who later became an important supporting character in Neil Gaiman's The Sandman. Much of the artwork in the series was by Filipino artists, many of whom had been recruited by Joe Orlando and Carmine Infantino in their 1971 recruiting trip to the Philippines.

Writers on Tales of Ghost Castle included Sergio Aragonés, Robert Kanigher, Paul Levitz, David Michelinie, Jack Oleck, Martin Pasko, and Mal Warwick. Artists on the series included Aragonés, Bill Draut, and the Filipino artists Ernie Chan, E. R. Cruz, Buddy Gernale, Alex Niño, Frank "Quico" Redondo, Nestor Redondo, and Ruben Yandoc.

== Publication history ==
Tales of Ghost Castle was one of several horror-mystery-suspense published by DC Comics during this era. Others include Doorway to Nightmare, Ghosts, House of Secrets, House of Mystery, The Unexpected, The Witching Hour, Secrets of Sinister House, Secrets of Haunted House, and Weird Mystery Tales.

Debuting in May/June 1975, Tales of Ghost Castle only lasted three issues before being cancelled.

== Lucien the librarian ==
In Tales of Ghost Castle, Lucien is portrayed as the guardian of a castle in Transylvania abandoned by both sides during World War II, watching over its forgotten library with his companion, a werewolf named Rover.
