= Stalker (DC Comics) =

- Cover of Stalker #1 by Steve Ditko.

Publication information
- Publisher: DC Comics
- First appearance: Stalker #1 (June/July 1975)
- Created by: Paul Levitz (writer); Steve Ditko (artist)

In-story information
- Alter ego: Elpis
- Abilities: Superhuman strength, senses and speed, various mystical abilities, expert fencer

Stalker is a fictional antihero and swords and sorcery character published by DC Comics. The character, created by Paul Levitz and Steve Ditko, debuted in Stalker #1 (June/July 1975). The art in all four issues of Stalker was handled by the team of Ditko (pencils) and Wally Wood (inks).

An original incarnation of the Stalker appears in Batman Beyond, voiced by Carl Lumbly.

== Publication history ==
The Stalker title lasted four issues (July 1975 to Jan. 1976) before it was cancelled by DC.

When discussing the creation of the character, Levitz recalled: "Carmine had literally had stuck his head in and said, 'Joe, I need two more sword and sorcery books. One's coming out in January, you're two months late on it, and one's out in February, you're only one month late on it'. 'I may be getting the months wrong but I think that's about what it was'. He walks out and I say, 'I could write one, you know. I like sword and sorcery, I can try that, Joe'. And Joe said, 'All right, come in with something tomorrow'. I went home and I channeled my best Michael Moorcock and came up with Stalker. He handed it to Ditko, who needed work. And I'm just… amazed".

Levitz elaborated that inspiration for Stalker was Michael Moorcock's Eternal Champion series.

== Fictional character biography ==
A young warrior seeking immortality and power challenges and defeats the Demon Lord Dgrth, winning immortality but losing his soul. The young warrior, now known as Stalker the Soulless, begins a quest to regain his lost soul. However, the more he traveled the greater his power grew, and the more he physically resembled Dgrth. Stalker eventually fights his way to the demon god in the depths of that dimension's netherworld, and defeats him, only to discover that the deity has already used up the energies of the traded soul. The only way to get his soul back would be to end the existence of that dimension's supreme deity, a solution which could only occur after the abolishment of all war.

Stalker the Souless later appeared in Swamp Thing Vol. 2 #163, arriving on Earth alongside Claw the Unconquered, Isis, Arion and Starfire. This storyline suggested that all DC "heroic fantasy" worlds were creations of Jim Rook (Nightmaster)'s mind, but this has been contradicted since.

=== JSA Returns ===
Stalker appeared in All-Star Comics (vol. 2) #1, and as a recurring theme in a retroactive story featuring the Justice Society of America at the end of World War II, the so-called "JSA Returns" event. Here, the soulless Stalker had evolved into an insane demon/supervillain, looking a lot like Dgrth, and bent on destroying dimension after dimension in his quest to end all conflict by ending all life. He was defeated and seemingly destroyed in a time warp generated by the Hourman android.

=== Wonder Woman ===
Stalker reappears in present-day in Wonder Woman vol. 3 #20, again alive, younger, more human and reminiscent of his original self. Here, he requests that Wonder Woman kill a demon from his dimension named D'Grth. To these ends he encourages her to recruit Beowulf Prince of Geats, and Claw the Unconquered. During this adventure Wonder Woman gives Stalker the proper name of Elpis, which means "hope" in Themyscirian. When D'Grth and Grendal eventually appear, Stalker reveals that he deceived the trio of warriors as a means of gaining his soul back at the bidding of D'Grth. He then throws his sword at Diana but Beowulf jumps in its way at the last second. Claw sees to Beowulf's wounds while Wonder Woman confronts Stalker. She tells him that Elpis is a female name. She then manages to steal the Rock of Destiny from Stalker and uses it to transport herself and D'Grth to Earth, leaving Stalker in his own world with an aspect of a soul. It is discovered that the soul Stalker possesses is in truth Diana's soul, which slowly began leaving her body shortly after her and Stalker's first meeting. Stalker, though reluctant, agreed to return Diana's soul to her and joined in the final destruction of D'Grth. He then leaves with an oracle as a companion.

=== The New 52 ===
In DC's 2011 relaunch of its continuity, The New 52, Stalker (by Marc Andreyko and Andrei Bressan) is reintroduced to The New 52 universe as a back-up feature in Sword of Sorcery.

=== DC Rebirth ===
The Batman Beyond incarnation of Stalker appears in the DC Rebirth title Batman Beyond.

== In other media ==
A futuristic, African incarnation of Stalker appears in media set in the DC Animated Universe (DCAU), voiced by Carl Lumbly. This version is a former big game hunter and poacher who underwent experimental surgery to restore his back after being injured by a panther and gained enhanced physical abilities. Introduced in Batman Beyond, Stalker later makes a minor appearance in the Justice League Unlimited episode "Epilogue" as a member of the Iniquity Collective.

== Collected editions ==
- The Steve Ditko Omnibus Volume 1 includes Stalker #1–4, 480 pages, September 2011, ISBN 1-4012-3111-X
