= Cavalier (character) =

The Cavalier
- Cavalier from Detective Comics #81. Art by Bob Kane.

Publication information
- Publisher: DC Comics
- First appearance: Mortimer Drake: Detective Comics #81 (November 1943); Hudson Pyle: Batman: Legends of the Dark Knight #32 (June 1992)
- Created by: Mortimer Drake: Don Cameron (writer); Bob Kane (artist); Hudson Pyle: James Robinson (writer); Tim Sale (artist)

In-story information
- Alter ego: Mortimer Drake
- Species: Human
- Team affiliations: Secret Society of Super Villains; Suicide Squad
- Abilities: Good athlete Skilled hand to hand combatant and swordsman Carries a rapier that emits electric blasts Feather plume-like steel tipped dart on his hat

Cavalier is the name of multiple supervillains appearing in American comic books and other media published by DC Comics. Both versions are enemies of Batman.

== Publication history ==
There are two incarnations of Cavalier. The first incarnation, Mortimer Drake, first appeared in Detective Comics #81 (November 1943) and was created by Don Cameron and Bob Kane. A second incarnation of Cavalier, Hudson Pyle, was created by writer James Robinson and artist Tim Sale, and first appeared in Batman: Legends of the Dark Knight #32 (June 1992).

== Fictional character biography ==
=== Mortimer Drake ===
Mortimer Drake was a man of exotic and idiosyncratic taste. When he found himself unable to purchase more exotic valuables for his collection legally, he resorted to theft. Donning a costume resembling that of a Musketeer, he called himself the Cavalier. His course of actions ultimately brought him into conflict with Batman and Robin. His code of gallantry was important to him; in one story, he helps an old woman carry her groceries in the middle of making his escape.

Drake matched wits against Batman and Robin several times, and escaped them in each encounter, but Batman was able to deduce the Cavalier's identity, leading to Drake's eventual imprisonment. In Batman Family #10, Batgirl and Batwoman team up to defeat Killer Moth and the Cavalier. Cavalier is unable to find a way around his code, which prevents him from hitting females, but after a self-examination he concludes "the devil with gallantry" and punches Batgirl.

Before Crisis on Infinite Earths, the Cavalier existed both on Earth-One and Earth-Two. The stories where he harmed women, something that neither the Earth-One nor Earth-Two versions of him would ever do, take place in Earth-B, an alternate Earth that included stories that could not be considered canonical on Earth-One or Earth-Two. Later "Earth-B" would be divided into two separate Earths: Earth-Twelve and Earth-Thirty-Two.

During "Knightfall", he faced Batman once again, but was defeated with ease. Cavalier had become insane and was kept in Arkham Asylum. The Cavalier was later said to have been in a closeted gay relationship with Captain Stingaree, another lesser-known Batman villain.In Batman: Battle for the Cowl, Cavalier temporarily becomes Leslie Thompkins' bodyguard. Soon afterward, he returns to crime and orchestrates the embezzlement of millions of dollars from Wayne Enterprises. Batman and Catwoman, working together, are able to follow the money trail to Drake, expose his role in the embezzlement, and return the money.

In September 2011, The New 52 revised the fictional history and characters portrayed in the DC Comics superhero comic book line. Cavalier is depicted as using Venom, a strength-enhancing drug also used by Bane.

=== Hudson Pyle ===
'Hudson Pyle is an ex-Hollywood stuntman looking for fame, becoming the Cavalier, a masked crimefighting vigilante. While Pyle's motives and actions are revealed to be honorable, he harbors a dark secret which ultimately leads to his downfall. Pyle is in love with a woman who is being blackmailed by gangsters, and as a result of this winds up being blackmailed as well. To save his love, Pyle is forced to commit burglaries and thus loses the confidence of the people. Pyle comes into conflict with Batman, defeating him in a sword duel. He leaves Batman, who is very weak and feverish after injuries sustained in a previous fight, and purposely charges nearby police officers. He is gunned down and dies of his injuries.

In Blackest Night, Pyle is temporarily resurrected as a member of the Black Lantern Corps.

In DC Rebirth, Pyle appears as a member of the Suicide Squad before being killed during his first mission.

== Powers and abilities ==
While he has no superhuman abilities, the Cavalier is a skilled athlete, hand-to-hand combatant, and swordsman who carries a rapier that emits electric blasts. Additionally, the feather plume in his hat is a steel-tipped dart.

== In other media ==
=== Television ===
- The Cavalier was considered to appear in The New Batman Adventures. Regarding the character, producer and writer Paul Dini once stated: "We've thought about using the Cavalier, and will probably get around to telling his story sooner or later". Later, Dini stated that the Cavalier's chances for an appearance in the series had become a "long shot". Ultimately, the Cavalier did not appear in the show.
- The Mortimer Drake incarnation of the Cavalier appears in Batman: The Brave and the Bold, voiced by Greg Ellis.
- The Mortimer Drake incarnation of the Cavalier appears in the DC Super Hero Girls episode "#DramaQueen", voiced by Griffin Puatu. This version is a student and stage actor at Metropolis High School who holds a grudge against Zatanna for upstaging him in an elementary school play.

=== Video games ===
- The Mortimer Drake incarnation of the Cavalier appears as a character summon in Scribblenauts Unmasked: A DC Comics Adventure.
- The Mortimer Drake incarnation of the Cavalier appears as an unlockable character in Lego Batman: Legacy of the Dark Knight.

=== Miscellaneous ===
- The Mortimer Drake incarnation of the Cavalier appears in the BBC radio adaptation of Batman: Knightfall, voiced by Kerry Shale.
- The Hudson Pyle incarnation of the Cavalier appears in The Batman Adventures #1.
- The Mortimer Drake incarnation of the Cavalier has a cameo in issue #12 of Teen Titans Go! (Vol. 3). He is the host of a romantic advice web series called Cavalier's Cave O' Love.

== See also ==
- List of Batman family enemies
