= Dollar Comics =

Line of DC Comics

Dollar Comics was a line of DC Comics comic book publications issued from 1977 to 1983 and revived in 2019. The 1977-1983 line included the titles The Superman Family, House of Mystery, G.I. Combat, World's Finest Comics, Batman Family, and Adventure Comics; as well as the series of specials with the umbrella title of DC Special Series. The 1977-1983 Dollar Comics were notable for costing $1, having 64 pages, and being advertising-free. The 2019 revival consists of full-issue one-shot reprints of key DC issues.

== History ==
=== 1977-1983 ===
According to then-DC publisher Jenette Kahn, comics' price-per-page value had been declining since the "Golden Age". When superhero comics debuted in the late 1930s, they featured 64 pages of art for 10¢. As the decades passed, comparable publications like Time and Life raised their prices, while comics stayed at 10 cents and reduced their page-count. Finally in December, 1961, National Periodical Publications/DC raised its price to 12¢, a 20% increase. Comparable magazines, in contrast, were by then 3.5-to-5 times their original price. By 1977, even though the typical price of a comic book was 35¢, it still lagged far behind its magazine competition, thus decreasing its appeal for newsvendors (which at that point — before the generalized 1980s shift to direct market distribution — was still the dominant retailing location for comics). Thus, the idea for Dollar Comics was born.

Writing for the Silver Bullet Comic Books website, John Wells detailed Dollar Comics' history:

When Jenette Kahn took over as DC's publisher in 1976, the average comic book contained only 17 pages of story for 35¢. Nearly half of each issue was filled with advertising and editorial content. Kahn's initial response was 1977's line of Dollar Comics. In terms of content, a Dollar Comic gave readers approximately the story pages of four 35¢ comic books for the price of three. From the retailer perspective, the Dollar Comic represented a greater profit than the standard 35¢ issues. And just to make sure nobody missed them, the books had a distinctive trade dress. The first two conversions to the format — House of Mystery and Superman Family — hit the stands shortly before Christmas in 1976 and the other two expanded titles — G.I. Combat and World's Finest Comics — debuted in January 1977. Sales on these — and several summer specials with the umbrella title of DC Special Series — paid off well enough to justify an expansion of the line in 1978. The Batman Family joined the fold in January and, at the dawn of the line-expanding DC Explosion in June, Adventure Comics came aboard. One of the perks of the Explosion was the complete elimination of advertising in the Dollar Comics and the addition of wraparound covers. They lost the quarter-inch height advantage, though. The DC Explosion, sadly, became an implosion almost immediately and, within a year, the ads were back, and the page count had shrunk. In 1980, DC made its second attempt at a line expansion and this time it clicked. The Dollar Comics were ad-free again by the end of the year.

Most Dollar Comics titles began as traditional format books and expanded to the Dollar Comic format. All-Out War and Time Warp were short lived series which were published entirely as Dollar Comics. Several anniversary issues such as Action Comics #500 and The Flash #300 were also in the format as were the DC annuals for 1982 and 1983.

==== 1977-1983 Dollar Comics titles ====
- Action Comics #500
- Adventure Comics #459-466
- All-Out War #1-6
- All-Star Squadron Annual #1-2
- Batman Annual #8
- Batman Family #17-20
- DC Comics Presents Annual #1-2
- DC Special Series #1, 5, 9, 11, 13, 15-17, 20-22
- Detective Comics #481-495
- The Flash #300
- G.I. Combat #201-259
- Green Lantern #150
- House of Mystery #251-259
- Justice League of America Annual #1
- Legion of Super-Heroes Annual #1-2
- New Teen Titans Annual #1-2
- The Saga of the Swamp Thing Annual #1
- Sgt. Rock Annual #2-3
- Superman Annual #9
- The Superman Family #182-222
- Superman III Movie Special #1
- Time Warp #1-5
- The Unexpected #189-195
- The Warlord Annual #1-2
- World's Finest Comics #244-282

=== 2019- ===
In 2019, DC revived the Dollar Comics line as a weekly series of one-shot reprints of key issues priced at $1, beginning with Detective Comics #854 -- the first comic to feature a solo adventure of the modern Batwoman.

==== 2019 revival issues ====
Title is followed by scheduled or actual publication date:

- Dollar Comics: Detective Comics #854 (September 4, 2019)
- Dollar Comics: Batman #608 (September 11, 2019)
- Dollar Comics: Harley Quinn (Volume 2) #1 (September 18, 2019)
- Dollar Comics: Crisis on Infinite Earths #1 (September 25, 2019)
- Dollar Comics: The Joker #1 (October 2, 2019)
- Dollar Comics: Watchmen #1 (October 9, 2019)
- Dollar Comics: Batman #497 (October 16, 2019)
- Dollar Comics: Swamp Thing #1 (October 23, 2019)
- Dollar Comics: Superman (Volume 2) #75 (October 30, 2019)
- Dollar Comics: Flashpoint (Volume 2) #1 (November 6, 2019)
- Dollar Comics: Blackest Night #1 (November 13, 2019)
- Dollar Comics: Lex Luthor: Man of Steel #1 (November 20, 2019)
- Dollar Comics: Infinite Crisis #1 (November 27, 2019)
- Dollar Comics: Birds of Prey #1 (December 4, 2019)
- Dollar Comics: Tales of the Teen Titans Annual #3 (December 11, 2019)
- Dollar Comics: The Flash (Volume 2) #164 (December 11, 2019)
- Dollar Comics: Batman #613 (January 1, 2020)
- Dollar Comics: The Brave and the Bold #197 (January 8, 2020)
- Dollar Comics: The Batman Adventures #12 (January 15, 2020)
- Dollar Comics: Batman/The Huntress: Cry for Blood #1 (January 22, 2020)
- Dollar Comics: Detective Comics #554 (January 29, 2020)
- Dollar Comics: Batman #386 (February 5, 2020)
- Dollar Comics: Batman: Shadow of the Bat #1 (February 5, 2020)
- Dollar Comics: Batman #567 (February 12, 2020)
- Dollar Comics: Green Lantern: Rebirth #1 (February 12, 2020)
- Dollar Comics: The Flash: Rebirth #1 (February 19, 2020)
- Dollar Comics: The New Teen Titans #2 (February 19, 2020)
- Dollar Comics: Amethyst #1 (February 26, 2020)
- Dollar Comics: Flash #1 (February 26, 2020)
- Dollar Comics: JLA: Year One #1 (March 4, 2020)
- Dollar Comics: Swamp Thing #57 (March 4, 2020)
- Dollar Comics: Batman #428 (March 11, 2020)
- Dollar Comics: Robin #1 (March 11, 2020)
- Dollar Comics: Justice League (1987) #1 (March 18, 2020)
- Dollar Comics: JLA #1 (March 18, 2020)
- Dollar Comics: Justice League (2011) #1 (March 25, 2020)
- Dollar Comics: Justice League of America #1 (March 25, 2020)
- Dollar Comics: Batman (2013) #13 (April 1, 2020)
- Dollar Comics: Green Lantern #1 (April 1, 2020)
- Dollar Comics: Batman #663 (April 8, 2020)
- Dollar Comics: Catwoman (2002) #1 (April 8, 2020)
- Dollar Comics: Catwoman (2011) #1 (April 15, 2020)
- Dollar Comics: Checkmate #1 (April 22, 2020)
- Dollar Comics: Detective Comics #826 (April 29, 2020)
- Dollar Comics: Batman #450 (April 29, 2020)
- Dollar Comics: Stars and S.T.R.I.P.E. #1 (May 6, 2020)
- Dollar Comics: DARK NIGHTS: METAL #1 (May 13, 2020)
- Dollar Comics: MANHUNTER #1 (May 13, 2020)
- Dollar Comics: Green Lantern #29 (May 20, 2020)
- Dollar Comics: Wonder Woman #212 (May 20, 2020)
- Dollar Comics: Wonder Woman #206 (May 27, 2020)
- Dollar Comics: Legion of Super-Heroes #1 (1989) (June 10, 2020)
- Dollar Comics: Saga of the Swamp Thing #1 (June 27, 2020)
- Dollar Comics: Sandman #23 (Nov 17, 2020)
