= Norma (comic artist) =

French comics artist (1946–2021)

Norbert Morandière (20 February 1946 – 1 January 2021), who used the pen name Norma, was a French comic book artist.

Morandière died on 1 January 2021 in Angoulême.

== Comic albums ==
- Capitaine Apache (story by Roger Lécureux)
  1. Capitaine Apache (Vaillant, 1980)
  2. L’Enfance d'un guerrier (Vaillant, 1980)
  3. Fils contre père (Vaillant, 1981)
  4. Un papoose de ton âge (Vaillant, 1981)
  - Sang pour sang (Messidor, 1986)
  - Capitaine Apache T.1 (Soleil, 1995)
  - Capitaine Apache T.2 (Soleil, 1995)
- Les Souvenirs de la pendule (story by Patrick Cothias, Glénat)
1. Schönbrunn (1989)
2. L’Étrangère (1989)
3. La Vie de château (1990)
- Hazel & Ogan (story by Bosse)
1. L’Épée de foudre (Blanco, 1989)
2. Le Pays des trolls (Blanco, 1991)
3. Moonwulf (Soleil, 1994)
- Pieter Hoorn (scénario de Frank Giroud, Glénat)
1. La Passe des cyclopes (1991)
2. Les Rivages trompeurs (1992)
3. La Baie des Français (1994)
- Saïto (scénario de François Corteggiani, Soleil)
1. La Nuit du Oni (1993)
2. La Lune rouge (1994)
3. La Griffe et le Sabre (1995)
- Le Bossu (story by François Corteggiani d’après Paul Féval, Glénat, 1997)
- Éner (story by Jacques-René Martin, éd. Devry)
1. Le Secret du temple de Salomon (1999)
- Rochefort, un voyage dans le temps (La Séguinière, 2001)
- Les Aventures imaginaires de Victor Hugo (story by Jacques Labib, L’Atelier)
1. On a volé Les Misérables ! (2003)
- Agatha Christie en bande dessinée (Emmanuel Proust)
1. L'Affaire Protheroe (2005)
- À 18 ans sous les balles au Vercors (Éditions du Signe, 2007)
