= The Joker (comic book) =

1975 comic book series by DC Comics

- Cover of The Joker #1 (May–June 1975), art by Dick Giordano.

Publication information
- Publisher: DC Comics
- Schedule: Vol. 1: #1–9: Bi-monthly; #10: Monthly
- Format: Ongoing series
- Genre: Superhero
- Publication date: Vol. 1: May 1975 - October 1976 (unreleased issue in October 2019); Vol. 2: March 2021 - July 2022
- No. of issues: Vol. 1: 10; Vol. 2: 16 and 1 Annual
- Main character: The Joker

Creative team
- Created by: Bob Kane; Bill Finger
- Written by: Vol. 1: Elliot S. Maggin, Dennis O'Neil, Martin Pasko; Vol. 2: James Tynion IV
- Penciller(s): Vol. 1: Ernie Chan, José Luis García-López, Irv Novick; Vol. 2: Guillem March
- Inker(s): Vol. 1: Tex Blaisdell, Vince Colletta, Dick Giordano, Frank McLaughlin
- Colorist: Vol. 2: Arif Prianto

The Joker is a comic book series published by the comic book publishing company DC Comics starring the supervillain the Joker. It ran for nine issues from May–June 1975 to September–October 1976, with a tenth previously unpublished issue released in October 2019.

In 2021, it was relaunched as part of DC's Infinite Frontier relaunch following Dark Nights: Death Metal's conclusion.

== Publication history ==
Dennis O'Neil, who wrote the first issue of the series, recounted that "I stopped by Julie [Schwartz, Batman editor]'s office, and he said, 'We're going to do a Joker book'. I know that alarms went off, I could sense the problems that such a thing would entail ...but it was a job". The series was launched in May 1975 by O'Neil and artist Irv Novick. In order to have him work as a protagonist, writers on the series toned down the Joker's insanity and to adhere to the Comics Code Authority, each issue would end with the Joker being apprehended, only to have escaped at the beginning of the next issue (the exceptions were issue #4, where the Joker seemingly falls to his death in a whirlpool in the ocean, only to return in the next issue as if nothing had happened and with no explanation as to how he survived; issue #5, which ends with the Joker being chased by police; issue #8, where the Joker returns to Arkham Asylum voluntarily; and issue #10, which ended on a cliffhanger that was never continued). Batman did not appear in the series.

=== 2020s ===
Following The Joker War and Dark Nights: Death Metal, James Tynion IV teamed up with Gulliem March to produce a new series, also titled The Joker, that debuted on March 2, 2021. The Joker series lasted a total of 15 issues, ending on July 5, 2022. On October of the same year a new series titled The Joker: The Man Who Stopped Laughing debuted, this time written by Matthew Rosenberg with art by Carmine Di Giandomenico.

== Issues ==
- No. 1 (May–June 1975) - "The Joker's Double Jeopardy!": When a villain named Senor Alvarez breaks Batman's enemy Two-Face out of Arkham Asylum and insults the Joker as being "not a superior criminal", the Joker breaks out of Arkham and decides to both get revenge and prove he is a "superior" criminal.
- No. 2 (July–August 1975) - "The Sad Saga of Willy the Weeper!": The Joker teams up with a villain called Willy the Weeper, who has a habit of crying when he tries to commit a crime and laughing when he sees others cry, to help him steal platinum after Willy the Weeper breaks him out.
- No. 3 (September–October 1975) - "The Last Ha Ha": After a battle with the Joker, the Creeper gets amnesia and is persuaded by the Joker that he is the Joker's ally.
- No. 4 (November–December 1975) - "A Gold Star for the Joker": The Joker falls in love with DC hero the Green Arrow's girlfriend Dinah Laurel Lance and gives her a choice: marry the Joker or die!
- No. 5 (January–February 1976) - "The Joker Goes 'Wilde'!": The Joker competes with Justice League foes the Royal Flush Gang for four valuable paintings done by the late artist Thaddeus Wilde.
- No. 6 (March–April 1976) - "Sherlock Stalks the Joker!": When the Joker hits Clive Sigerson, an actor playing the famous detective Sherlock Holmes, on his head with a pipe, Sigerson believes he is Holmes and that the Joker is Holmes' archenemy, Professor Moriarty. "Holmes" "stalks" the Joker with the help of a stagehand sent to follow him (who used to be a sailor who worked on the docks) named "Dock" Watson.
- No. 7 (May–June 1976) - "Luthor -- You're Driving Me Sane!": An experiment of Superman villain Lex Luthor's goes awry (thanks to the Joker's interference) and gives the Joker Luthor's genius and Luthor the Joker's insanity.
- No. 8 (July–August 1976) - "The Scarecrow's Fearsome Face-Off!": When the Joker steals some "fear-gas" from S.T.A.R. Labs, he ends up competing with fellow Batman villain the Scarecrow to see whose "fear-based" weapon is the best. The Joker wins.
- No. 9 (September–October 1976) - "The Cat and the Clown!": The Joker and Batman's "frenemy" Catwoman end up competing for a movie actor's trained feline sidekick. Catwoman's victory leads to a two-way rivalry...
- No. 10 (October–December 2019) - "99 and 99/100% Dead!": The Joker makes a deal with "Lou Cipher" to defeat the Justice League and kill a scientist developing a health serum. After defeating the Flash, the Black Canary, the Green Arrow, and Wonder Woman, the Joker discovers that, while they lack pulses, the League members continue to have brainwaves.

=== Unpublished issue #10 ===
The letters page of The Joker #9 (Sept.–Oct. 1976) mentions that Martin Pasko was writing a Joker vs. the Justice League of America story titled "99 and 99/100% Dead!" to appear in The Joker #10 as the first part of a two- or three-issue story arc, which was never published despite being listed as "on sale right now" on the Daily Planet promotional page for August 16, 1976. In the end notes of The Greatest Joker Stories Ever Told (1989), it is noted that The Joker editor Julius Schwartz had no recollection of this story ever being completed, but Pasko found xeroxed pages of the story which he sold on eBay in 2011. A cover for issue #10 was drawn by Ernie Chan, but was not finished at the time. The Joker #10 was published for the first time on August 14, 2019, in DC's The Joker: The Bronze Age Omnibus (which also contains The Joker #1-9 as well as other DC Comics Joker stories from the 1970s) and as a stand-alone issue on October 3.

== Collected editions ==
=== Pre-Crisis (1975-1976 and 2019) ===
Title	Issues collected	Release date	Pages	ISBN
The Greatest Joker Stories Ever Told	includes The Joker #3 with various other issues	HC: December 1988 SC: October 1997	288 pages	ISBN 978-0930289362
Stacked Deck: The Greatest Joker Stories Ever Told - Expanded Edition	includes The Joker #3	HC (leather-bound): November 1990	352 pages	ISBN 978-0681410152
The Joker: The Clown Prince of Crime	The Joker #1–9	SC: November 2013	176 pages	ISBN 978-1401242589
The Joker: The Bronze Age Omnibus	The Joker #1–10	HC: August 2019	832 pages	ISBN 978-1401293406

=== Infinite Frontier (2021-2022) ===
Title	Issues collected	Release date	ISBN
The Joker Vol. 1	The Joker (vol. 2) #1-5, Batman (vol. 3) #100, Batman: The Joker War Zone	HC: November 2021 SC: October 2022	ISBN 978-1779512017
The Joker Vol. 2	The Joker (vol. 2) #6-9 and The Joker 2021 Annual #1	HC: August 2022 SC: July 2023	ISBN 978-0681410152
The Joker Vol. 3	The Joker (vol. 2) #10-15	HC: February 2023	ISBN 978-1401242589

== Animation ==
- Willy the Weeper appeared as a one-time villain in the Batman: The Brave and the Bold TV episode "Joker: The Vile and the Villainous!", voiced by Tim Conway, in which the Joker recruits him into becoming a supervillain again after facing a humiliating defeat by Bulletman.
