= Captain Stingaree =

DC Comics supervillain

- Captain Stingaree from Detective Comics #460, artist Ernie Chan.

Publication information
- Publisher: DC Comics
- First appearance: Detective Comics #460 (June 1976)
- Created by: Bob Rozakis (writer); Michael Uslan (writer); Ernie Chan (artist)

In-story information
- Alter ego: Karl Courtney
- Team affiliations: Secret Society of Super-Villains
- Notable aliases: Karl Crossman
- Abilities: Skilled swordsman

Captain Stingaree (Karl Courtney) is a supervillain appearing in American comic books published by DC Comics, and a minor foe of Batman. He first appeared in Detective Comics #460 (June 1976), and was created by Bob Rozakis, Michael Uslan, and Ernie Chan.

== Publication history ==
In his memoir The Boy Who Loved Batman, Uslan says that he and Rozakis were excited to create a pirate-themed villain for Batman, but disappointed by the name that editor Julius Schwartz gave the character: "Bob said it was the name of some old movie about a notorious highwayman played by Richard Dix or Fort Dix or some old actor. I hated the name Stingaree. Bob hated the name Stingaree. But Julie liked it, and so it came to pass".

== Fictional character biography ==
Born one of a set of quadruplets, Karl Courtney was always the black sheep of the family. Donning a cutlass and pirate outfit, Karl becomes Captain Stingaree. In his first outing, Stingaree attempts to uncover Batman's secret identity and becomes convinced that his brothers are collectively acting as Batman. Batman approaches the Courtney brothers, asking them to pose as Batman and act as bait for Stingaree. This allows the real Batman and the Flash to capture Stingaree.

In Secret Society of Super-Villains #6 (1977), Captain Stingaree joins the eponymous Society. He, Captain Cold, and Captain Boomerang embark on a crime spree kidnapping other captains to show supremacy over air, land and sea, before they are defeated by Captain Comet and Black Canary.

In Detective Comics #526, Captain Stingaree meets at an old theater with other Batman villains. Talia al Ghul is branded a traitor. While Talia escapes, Stingaree is accidentally frozen by Mr. Freeze. This is his last pre-Crisis appearance.

=== Post-Crisis ===
In post-Crisis continuity, it is revealed that Captain Stingaree is gay and in a relationship with the Cavalier (Mortimer Drake). Black Lightning uses this fact to leverage information out of Cavalier. Both Stingaree and Cavalier are killed during a fight with the Secret Six.

=== DC Rebirth ===
Captain Stingaree is resurrected following The New 52 and DC Rebirth relaunches. He is portrayed as a man who assumes the identity of Stingaree when not under the influence of his medication. Stingaree attempts to murder several people who clearly know him and are dressed as Batman. They plead with him to go back on his medication, but he says that they will not "deceive him again". He is stopped by the real Batman and "Gotham Girl" before anyone is seriously injured.

== Powers and abilities ==
Captain Stingaree has no superpowers but is a skilled swordsman.

== In other media ==
Captain Stingaree appears as a character summon in Scribblenauts Unmasked: A DC Comics Adventure.

== See also ==
- List of Batman family enemies
