= E. R. Cruz =

Filipino comics artist

- Born: Eufronio Reyes Cruz; 1934 (age 91–92) The Philippines
- Areas: Penciller, Artist, Inker
- Notable works: Ghosts; G.I. Combat; The Shadow

Eufronio Reyes Cruz (born 1934) is a Filipino comics artist best known for his work on mystery comics and war comics for DC Comics in the 1970s and 1980s.

== Biography ==
E. R. Cruz began his career as an artist by drawing for such publications as Liwayway in the Philippines and worked in Tony DeZuniga's studio from 1963 to 1971.

His first story for the U.S. comics industry, "Let's Scare Lisa to Death", was published in DC Comics' The Unexpected #139 (Sept. 1972). From 1972 to 1987, Cruz drew stories for various DC titles such as Ghosts, G.I. Combat, House of Mystery, House of Secrets, Our Fighting Forces, The Unexpected, and The Witching Hour. He collaborated with writer Dennis O'Neil on three issues of The Shadow as well as a Sherlock Holmes one-shot.

Comics historian Chris Knowles noted that "E. R. Cruz had the most Asian style of the Filipino bunch. His art demonstrated a strong Chinese influence (as opposed to artists like [Nestor] Redondo whose work reflected a more American approach). Cruz's style was very dark and nebulous and was subsequently often difficult to parse."

A rare example of Cruz drawing super-heroes was when he inked the first three issues of Moon Knight vol. 2 for Marvel Comics in 1985. In 1987, Cruz began working in animation and was a background artist/layout artist for Attack of the Killer Tomatoes, Little Shop, The Transformers, and X-Men: Pryde of the X-Men. Beginning in 1991, he worked on Marvel's Savage Sword of Conan series and drew stories featuring Conan or Kull the Conqueror. His final credited comic book story in the U.S. was "Death in a High Place" in Savage Sword of Conan #233 (May 1995).

== Bibliography ==
=== DC Comics ===
- All Out War #1–3 (1979–1980)
- DC Special Series #4, 7, 22 (1977–1980)
- Detective Comics #572 (1987)
- Ghosts #11, 14, 24, 26, 29–34, 36, 38–39, 42, 45, 47, 50–53, 56–60, 64, 78 (full art); #25 (inks over Rico Rival) (1973–1979)
- G.I. Combat #190, 198–199, 201–219, 221–226, 228–241, 243, 245–248, 250, 252, 255, 257, 259, 262–266, 268–269, 272, 274, 279–280, 287 (1976–1987)
- House of Mystery #208, 223, 225, 230, 238, 240, 254, 257–258, 278, 285, 287–288, 311 (1972–1982)
- House of Secrets #102, 121, 135, 141, 145 (full art); #115 (inks over Nards Cruz) (1972–1977)
- Jonah Hex #26, 28–29, 33 (1979–1980)
- Limited Collectors' Edition #C–32 (1974)
- Our Army at War #250, 255 (1972–1973)
- Our Fighting Forces #164–181 (1976–1978)
- Secrets of Haunted House #2, 4, 28, 34 (1975–1981)
- Sgt. Rock #412, 417 (1986–1987)
- The Shadow #10–12 (1975)
- Sherlock Holmes #1 (1975)
- Tales of Ghost Castle #2 (1975)
- The Unexpected #139, 142–143, 149, 151, 153, 157, 171, 175–176, 178, 183, 188, 190, 192 (1972–1979)
- Weird Mystery Tales #11, 17, 21 (1974–1975)
- Weird War Tales #36, 38, 67, 90, 106 (1975–1981)
- The Witching Hour #26, 29, 36–37, 39, 41, 49, 53, 57, 59, 61, 63–65, 68, 70, 72–73, 76–78 (1972–1978)

=== First Comics ===
- Sable #9–10, 13–14, 19 (inks over Bill Jaaska); #12, 18 (inks over John Hebert); #23–24 (inks over Al Bigley) (1988–1990)

=== Heroic Publishing ===
- Eternity Smith #2–3 (inks over Rick Hoberg) (1987)
- Flare #4 (1991)

=== Marvel Comics ===
- Conan the Barbarian #261–262 (1992)
- Doctor Strange Annual #2 (inks over M.C. Wyman) (1992)
- Marvel Classics Comics #6–7, 10–11 (1976)
- Moon Knight vol. 2 #1–3 (inks over Chris Warner) (1985)
- Savage Sword of Conan #190–192, 196–199, 202, 216, 218, 229–233 (full art); #207–210 (inks over John Buscema); #219–221, 223–224, 226, 229, 231–232 (inks over Mike Docherty) (1991–1995)

=== Warren Publishing ===
- Eerie #113, 116–117, 119–120, 122, 124, 126–128, 130, 132, 134, 138 (1980–1983)

| Preceded by Frank Robbins | The Shadow artist 1975 | Succeeded by Howard Chaykin (in 1986) |
