= All-Out War =

Publication information
- Publisher: DC Comics
- Schedule: Bimonthly
- Format: Ongoing series
- Genre: War
- Publication date: September–October 1979 – July–August 1980
- No. of issues: 6
- Main character: Viking Commando

Creative team
- Written by: List: David Allikas, Murray Boltinoff, J. M. DeMatteis, Archie Goodwin, Bob Haney, Robert Kanigher, Carl Wessler
- Artist: List: Mar Amongo, Edgar Bercasio, John Calnan, E. R. Cruz, Lee Elias, George Evans, Jerry Grandenetti, Jess Jodloman, Ernesto Patricio, Bill Payne, Rico Rival, Rene H. Samson
- Penciller: Dick Ayers
- Inker: Romeo Tanghal
- Letterer: List: Shelly Leferman, Esphid Mahilum, Ben Oda, Bill Payne, Gaspar Saladino, Milton Snapinn
- Colorist: List: Bob LeRose, Adrienne Roy, Jerry Serpe, Tatjana Wood
- Editor: Murray Boltinoff

All-Out War is an American war comics anthology series published by DC Comics from 1979 to 1980. It primarily featured characters created by writer Robert Kanigher with the Viking Commando being the lead feature.

== Publication history ==
The first issue was published with a September–October 1979 cover date. Joe Kubert drew the cover art for the entire run and Murray Boltinoff was the editor of the series. The series was in the Dollar Comics format and the lead character was the Viking Commando created by writer Robert Kanigher and artist George Evans. Other features included "Black Eagle" by Kanigher and artists Dick Ayers and Romeo Tanghal and "Guerrilla War starring Force 3" by Kanigher and Jerry Grandenetti. All-Out War was canceled as of issue #6 (July–August 1980). The Viking Commando later appeared in a two-part backup feature in Unknown Soldier #266 (Aug. 1982) and #267 (Sept. 1982).
