= John Pierotti =

American cartoonist

John Pierotti (July 26, 1911 – May 1987) was a cartoonist who was probably best known for his editorial cartoons for PM and the New York Post, for which he also drew sports cartoons. He received the National Cartoonist Society Editorial Cartoon Award for 1975.

Having first been Treasurer for 9 years, he was president of the National Cartoonist's Society from 1957 to 1959 and won numerous awards for his cartoons. His father, Roger C. Pierotti, emigrated from Italy, and was a Professor of Oil Painting and his mother, of German descent, was a sculptor. He lived in Brooklyn for most of his life where he raised his three children Melba, John Jr., and Pamela with his wife Helen, née Mastrangelo.
