= Weird Mystery Tales =

Discontinued mystery horror comics anthology

- Weird Mystery Tales #1 (July–August 1972), art by Michael Kaluta.

Publication information
- Publisher: DC Comics
- Schedule: Bimonthly
- Format: Ongoing series
- Genre: Horror
- Publication date: July–August 1972 – November 1975
- No. of issues: 24
- Main characters: Dr. E. Leopold Maas; Destiny; Eve

Creative team
- Written by: List: Howard Purcell Mark Evanier Jack Oleck Steve Skeates Sheldon Mayer George Kashdan John Albano Murray Boltinoff Michael Fleisher David Michelinie Paul Levitz
- Penciller: List: Jack Kirby Berni Wrightson Howard Purcell Ruben Yandoc Alfredo Alcala Alex Niño Tony DeZuniga Nestor Redondo Gil Kane Jess Jodloman Ernie Chan Frank Robbins E. R. Cruz Leopoldo Duranona Fred Carrillo Michael Kaluta
- Inker: List: Mike Royer Jack Abel
- Editor: List: E. Nelson Bridwell (#1–3) Joe Orlando (#4–14 and #22–24) Tex Blaisdell (#15–21)

Weird Mystery Tales is a mystery horror comics anthology published by DC Comics from July–August 1972 to November 1975.

== Publication history ==
=== 100 Page Super Spectacular ===
The title Weird Mystery Tales was first used for DC 100 Page Super Spectacular #4 in 1971. It reprinted stories from My Greatest Adventure #8, 12, 14, 15, and 20; Sensation Mystery #110 and 116; House of Secrets #2; The Phantom Stranger #1; Tales of the Unexpected #15 and 24; and House of Mystery #49.

=== Ongoing series ===
The Weird Mystery Tales ongoing series was launched in July–August 1972 and was originally hosted by Destiny. The hosting role was gradually taken over by Eve, who fully assumed the title with issue #15 (December 1974–January 1975). The title's name was partially inspired by the sales success of Weird War Tales and Weird Western Tales. Early issues printed material by Jack Kirby that had been intended for his black-and-white, magazine-size DC comic series, Spirit World, which lasted only one issue. These stories featured Dr. E. Leopold Maas as host, sometimes with an appended hosting segment by Destiny.

Weird Mystery Tales contributors, in addition to Kirby, included Alfredo Alcala, Tony DeZuniga, Michael Kaluta, Alex Niño, Howard Purcell, Nestor Redondo, Jack Sparling, and Bernie Wrightson. Howard Purcell's last known work in the comics industry was a story each in Weird Mystery Tales #1–3 (Aug.–Dec. 1972), plus the cover of #2.

=== Ashcan edition ===
In 1996, DC published a free ashcan edition titled Weird Mystery Tales, with the tagline, "Welcome to the Dark Side of DC". It was written by Adam Philips and drawn by Anthony Williams.

== Collected editions ==
- Spirit World includes "Horoscope Phenomenon or Witch Queen of Ancient Sumeria?" from Weird Mystery Tales #1; "Toxl the World Killer!" from Weird Mystery Tales #2; and "The Burners!" from Weird Mystery Tales #3, 108 pages, May 2012, ISBN 1401234186.
