= David Michelinie =

American comic book writer

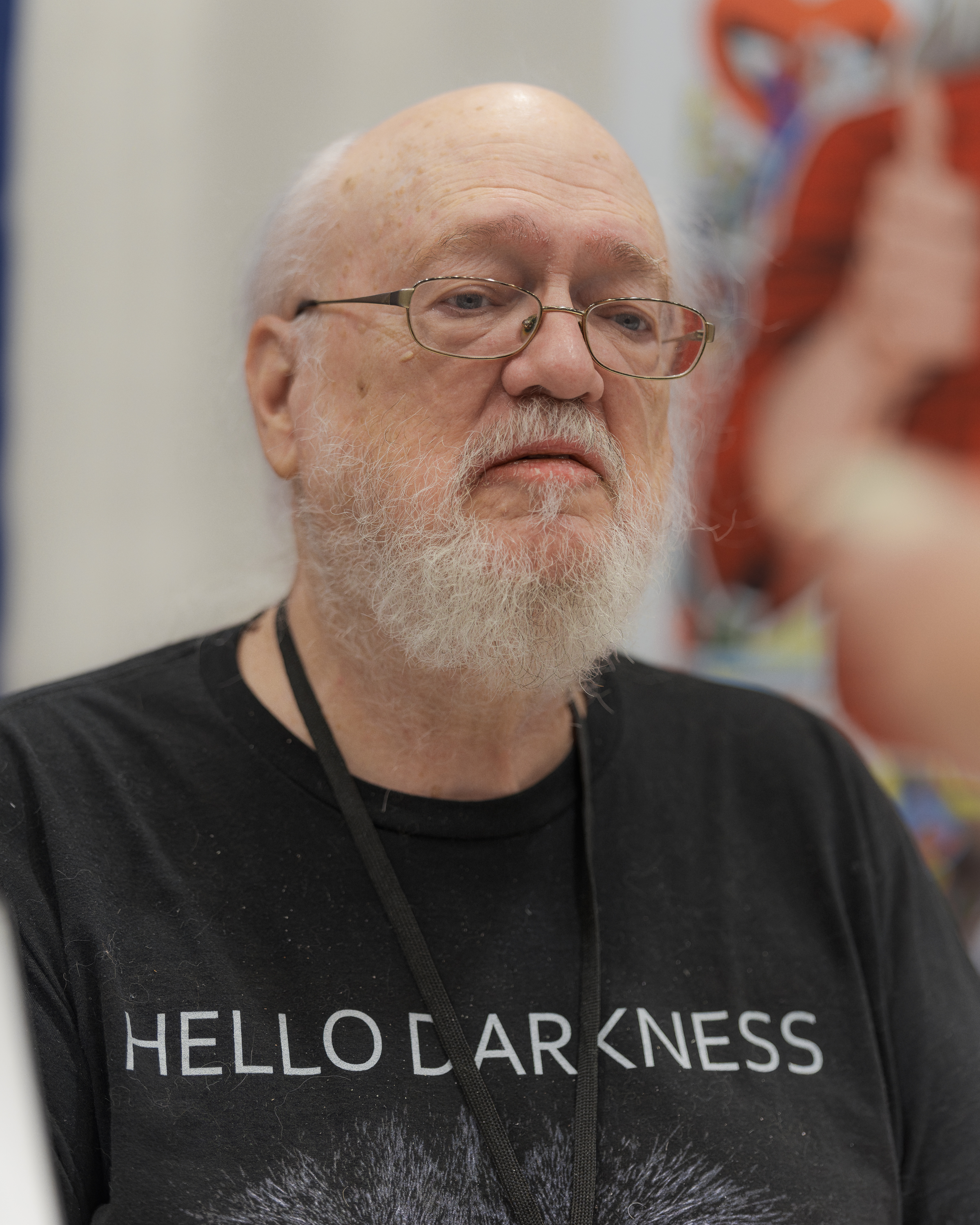
- Michelinie in 2026
- Born: May 6, 1948 (age 78)
- Area: Writer
- Pseudonym: Barry Jameson
- Notable works: Action Comics; The Amazing Spider-Man; Venom; Iron Man

David Michelinie (/mɪkəˈlaɪni/; born May 6, 1948) is an American comic book writer best known for scripting Marvel Comics' The Amazing Spider-Man and Iron Man and the DC Comics feature Superman in Action Comics. Among the characters he created or co-created are Venom, Carnage, Scott Lang / Ant-Man, Taskmaster, Ghost and War Machine.

== Early career ==
Michelinie grew up in Louisville, Kentucky, and worked at a commercial film production company before moving to New York to take part in an apprenticeship program started by DC Comics.

Some of Michelinie's earliest work appears in DC Comics' House of Secrets and a run on Swamp Thing (#14–18 and #21–22), the latter illustrated by Nestor Redondo. Michelinie and artist Ernie Chan created Claw the Unconquered in 1975. Michelinie did a run on Aquaman in Adventure Comics which led to the revival of the Sea King's own title in 1977. In the Aquaman story in Adventure Comics #452, Black Manta killed Aquaman's son Arthur Curry Jr. by suffocation. The infant's death has affected the character ever since. While writing the Karate Kid series, Michelinie used the name "Barry Jameson" as a pseudonym. With artist Ed Davis, he created Gravedigger in Men of War #1 (Aug. 1977). The Star Hunters were created by Michelinie with editor Joe Orlando and artist Don Newton, debuted in DC Super Stars #16 (Sept.–Oct. 1977), and featured in their own short-lived series. The original storyline for Madame Xanadu in Doorway to Nightmare #1 (Feb. 1978) was developed by Michelinie and Val Mayerik.

== Marvel Comics ==
Among Michelinie's best-known work are his two runs on Iron Man with co-plotter/inker Bob Layton, in the late 1970s and early 1980s which introduced the character's alcoholism and his specialized power armor variants. He introduced two of Tony Stark's closest comrades, Bethany Cabe and Jim Rhodes as well as new enmities with Justin Hammer and Doctor Doom. His most noted cliffhanger was when Stark is thrown out of S.H.I.E.L.D.'s helicarrier and has to don his armor completely to use its flight function before he hits the ground. After leaving the title in 1981, Michelinie reunited with Layton on the book late in 1986, and along with penciller M. D. Bright, closed out preceding writer Dennis O'Neil's Advanced Idea Mechanics arc and launched the "Armor Wars"; during this time he and Layton introduced the character Ghost. Michelinie said that he had thought he would never return to Iron Man, feeling that by the end of his run he and Bob Layton had done everything they set out to do with the series, but when the editor offered him the assignment, he agreed to do it after thinking about it overnight. Michelinie left Iron Man again after issue #250, closing his second collaboration with Layton with a sequel to their Iron Man-Doctor Doom time travel episode from issues #149–150.

Michelinie was one of the writers of The Avengers from 1978 to 1982 and worked with artists John Byrne and George Pérez. During this time he and Byrne created Scott Lang in The Avengers #181 (March 1979), and he created the Taskmaster with Pérez in The Avengers #195 (May 1980).

From 1987 to 1994, Michelinie wrote The Amazing Spider-Man series, which featured the art of Todd McFarlane, Erik Larsen, and Mark Bagley, while introducing the supervillains Venom in issue #298 (March 1988) and Carnage in #361 (April 1992). Michelinie had planned to introduce Venom earlier and included a "teaser" scene in Web of Spider-Man #18, in which Peter Parker is pushed by an offscreen Venom into the path of an oncoming train, the symbiote being unsusceptible to Spider-Man's "spider sense" that would have normally warned him of the attack. This was the first of what was to be several clues leading to the reveal of Venom. Michelinie left Web of Spider-Man shortly after and was not able to continue the introduction of Venom until his time writing The Amazing Spider-Man.

Behind Stan Lee, Michelinie had the second longest run on The Amazing Spider-Man as a writer.

He also wrote the limited series Venom: Lethal Protector in 1993, where Venom was the main character and acted as an antihero instead of villain for the first time.

== Valiant, return to DC and Future Comics ==
In the early 1990s David Michelinie worked at Valiant Comics on the titles Rai, H.A.R.D. Corps, Turok: Dinosaur Hunter and Magnus, Robot Fighter.

He began working for DC again with the launch of the Justice League Task Force series in 1993 with artist Sal Velluto. In 1994, Michelinie became the writer of Action Comics which he stayed on for three years. As one of the five principal Superman writers at that time he co-wrote Superman: The Wedding Album in 1996. David Michelinie and artist Paul Ryan are the only comic book creators to have contributed to the wedding issues of both Spider-Man (Peter Parker marrying Mary Jane Watson in The Amazing Spider-Man Annual #21, 1987) and Superman (Clark Kent) marrying Lois Lane in Superman: The Wedding Album (Dec. 1996). He also wrote issues of Superman Adventures and Steel as well as the miniseries Legion: Science Police, Superman's Nemesis: Lex Luthor and Superman vs. Predator, his last credited work for DC Comics in 2000. The same year, he joined forces with Bob Layton again for the miniseries Iron Man: Bad Blood for Marvel Comics.

After a hiatus Michelinie returned to comics by teaming-up with Bob Layton and Dick Giordano to form Future Comics, where he wrote the series Freemind, Metallix and Deathmask from 2002 to 2003. The company closed in 2004.

== Later career ==
In 2007, Michelinie wrote Kolchak Tales: The Frankenstein Agenda #1–3 for Moonstone Books. Also for Moonstone, he wrote several prose short stories which appeared in the anthologies The Phantom Chronicles (2007), Werewolves: Dead Moon Rising (2007) and The Avenger: The Justice Inc. Files (2011).

In 2008, he and Layton collaborated again on a four-issue Iron Man: Legacy of Doom miniseries and in 2009 on the one-shot Iron Man: The End for Marvel Comics. It was followed by the one-shot What If? Iron Man: Demon in an Armor in 2011 and a four-issue-follow-up on the "Armor Wars" storyline published as Iron Man #258.1–258.4 in 2013.

David Michelinie returned to his creation Venom with stories for Venom #150 (2017), Venom Annual #1 (2018) and Venom vol. 4 #25 (2020), all penciled by Ron Lim, who had also worked on Venom: Lethal Protector. After the success of the first two Venom films, in 2021 Marvel commissioned Michelinie to write a new five-issue miniseries: Venom: Lethal Protector vol. 2, with art by Ivan Fiorelli, that was published in 2022. It was followed by Venom: Lethal Protector II, another five-part limited series, drawn by Farid Karami, in 2023. The next year, Marvel published another Venom limited series, Venom: Separation Anxiety vol. 2, written by David Michelinie and drawn by Gerardo Sandoval. In 2024, Michelinie also returned to Spider-Man with a ten-page story for Spider-Man: Black Suit & Blood #4.

== Screenwriting ==
As screenwriter, Michelinie worked on two episodes of the animated series Iron Man: Armored Adventures (with Bob Layton as co-writer) and wrote the short films Hellevator (2011) and Nobody's Tomorrow (2018).

== Bibliography ==
=== DC Comics ===
- Action Comics #702–722, 724–736, #0, Annual #7–9 (1994–1997)
- Adventure Comics #441, 443, 445, 450–452 (Aquaman), #456–458 (Superboy) (1975–1978)
- Aquaman #57–61 (1977–1978)
- Army at War #1 (1978)
- Cancelled Comic Calvacade #1 (Claw the Unconquered) (1978)
- Claw the Unconquered #1–12 (1975–1978)
- DC Comics Presents #3 (Superman and Adam Strange) (1978)
- DC Super Stars #16 (Star Hunters) (1977)
- DC Universe Holiday Bash #1 (1997)
- Doorway to Nightmare #1 (1978)
- Hercules Unbound #7–9 (1976–1977)
- House of Mystery #224, 232, 235, 238, 248, 252, 257–259, 263, 286–287 (1974–1980)
- House of Secrets #116, 122, 126–127, 130, 147 (1974–1977)
- Jonah Hex #13–15 (1978)
- Justice League Task Force #1–3 (1993)
- Karate Kid #2–10 (1976–1977)
- Legion: Science Police #1–4 (1998)
- Men of War #1–4 (1977–1978)
- Phantom Stranger #35–36 (1975)
- Plop! #7–8, 19 (1974–1976)
- Secrets of Haunted House #5 (1975)
- Sgt. Rock #311, 315 (1977–1978)
- Shadowdragon Annual #1 (1995)
- Starfire #1–2 (1976)
- Star Hunters #1–7 (1977–1978)
- Star Spangled War Stories #183–192, 194–203 (Unknown Soldier) (1974–1977)
- Steel #17–19 (1995)
- Superman Annual #8 (1996)
- Superman Adventures #32, 44, Special #1 (1998–2000)
- Superman's Nemesis: Lex Luthor #1–4 (1999)
- Superman: The Wedding Album #1 (1996)
- Superman vs. Predator #1–4 (2000)
- Swamp Thing #14–18, 21–22 (1975–1976)
- Tales of Ghost Castle #1 (1975)
- Unknown Soldier #254–256 (1981)
- Weird Mystery Tales #15–16 (1974–1975)
- Weird War Tales #30, 72 (1974–1979)
- Wonder Woman #218 (script consultant to Martin Pasko) (1975)

=== Marvel Comics ===
- The Amazing Spider-Man #205, 290–292, 296–352, 359–388, Annual #21–26, 28, Annual '95, Super Special #1 (1980, 1987–1995)
- The Avengers #173, 175–176, 181–187, 189, 191–205, 221, 223, 340 (1978–1982, 1991)
- The Bozz Chronicles #1–6 (1985–1986)
- Captain America #258–259, Annual #5 (1981)
- Carnage vol. 2 #1 (2022)
- Daredevil #167 (1980)
- Death of the Venomverse (backup-story) #2–5 (2023)
- Doctor Strange #46 (1981)
- Further Adventures of Indiana Jones #4–18, 20–22, 26–27 (1983–1985)
- Hero #1–6 (1990)
- The Incredible Hulk #232 (1979)
- Indiana Jones and the Last Crusade #1–4 (1989)
- Indiana Jones and the Temple of Doom #1–3 (1984)
- Iron Man #116–157, 215–250, Annual #9–10 (1978–1982, 1987–1989)
- Iron Man #258.1–258.4 (2013)
- Iron Man: Bad Blood #1–4 (2000)
- Iron Man: Legacy of Doom #1–4 (2008)
- Iron Man: The End #1 (2009)
- Krull #1–2 (1983)
- Marvel Fanfare #4 (1982)
- Marvel Graphic Novel #16–17, 27 (1985–1987)
- Marvel Premiere #47–48, 55–56 (1979–1980)
- Marvel Super-Heroes #5, 14 (1991–1993)
- Marvel Super Special #28, 30 (1983–1984)
- Marvel Team-Up #103, 108, 110, 136, 142–143 (1981–1984)
- Marvel Two-In-One #76, 78, 97–98, Annual #4 (1979–1983)
- Mother Theresa of Calcutta (1984)
- Pro Action Magazine #1 (Spider-Man) (1994)
- Psi-Force #7 (1987)
- Questprobe #3 (1985)
- The Spectacular Spider-Man #173–175, 220, Annual #11–12, Super Special #1 (1991–1995)
- Spider-Man #35, Super Special #1 (1993–1995)
- Spider-Man: Black Suit & Blood #4 (2024)
- Spider-Man: The Bug Stops Here #1 (1994)
- Spider-Man Magazine #3 (text story) (2007)
- Star Wars #51–52, 55–69, 78, Annual #2 (1981–1983)
- Thundercats #1–6 (1985–1986)
- Toxic Crusaders #8 (1992)
- Venom #150, Annual #1 (2017–2018)
- Venom vol. 4 #25 (2020)
- Venom: Black, White & Blood #1 (2025)
- Venom: Lethal Protector #1–6 (1993)
- Venom: Lethal Protector vol. 2 #1–5 (2022)
- Venom: Lethal Protector II #1–5 (2023)
- Venom: Separation Anxiety vol. 2 #1–5 (2024)
- Venom Super Special #1 (1995)
- Web of Spider-Man #8–9, 14–20, 23–24, 70, Annual #7–8, Super Special #1 (1985–1995)
- What If #38 (1983)
- What If vol. 2 #85 (1996)
- What If? Iron Man: Demon in an Armor (2011)
- Wonder Man #1 (1986)

=== Warren Publishing ===
- Creepy #84 (1976)
- Eerie #81 (with Louise Simonson) (1977)

=== Valiant Comics ===
- H.A.R.D. Corps #1–16 (1992–1994)
- Magnus, Robot Fighter #11, 18–19 (1992)
- Rai #1–8 (1992)
- Secrets of the Valiant Universe #1 (1994)
- Turok: Dinosaur Hunter #1–3 (1993)

=== Image Comics / Valiant Comics ===
- Deathmate Yellow #1 (1993)

=== Future Comics ===
- Death Mask #1–3 (2003)
- Freemind #0–7 (2002–2003)
- Metallix #0–6, Free Comic Book Day #1 (2002–2003)

=== Moonstone ===
- Kolchak Tales: The Frankenstein Agenda #1–3 (2007)
- The Phantom: Ghost Who Walks #1–4 (consultant to Mike Bullock) (2009)

=== Maneki Neko Books ===
- Gladstone’s School for World Conquerors: Gladstone's Revenge (one-shot) (2023)

=== Binge Books (Sitcomics) ===
- Heroes Union: The Witch and the Warriors #1 (2025)

=== American Mythology Productions ===
- The Living Corpse: The Hexx Files #1 (2026)

Preceded by Bill Mantlo	Iron Man writer 1978–1982 (with Bob Layton in 1978–1981)	Succeeded by Dennis O'Neil
Preceded by Tom DeFalco	The Avengers writer 1979–1981	Succeeded by Bob Budiansky and Danny Fingeroth
Preceded by Danny Fingeroth	Iron Man writer 1987–1989 (with Bob Layton)	Succeeded by Dwayne McDuffie
Preceded by Jim Owsley	The Amazing Spider-Man writer 1987–1994	Succeeded by J. M. DeMatteis
Preceded by Roger Stern	Action Comics writer 1994–1997	Succeeded by Stuart Immonen
