= Giuseppe Montanari (cartoonist) =

Italian comic artist (1936–2023)

- Born: 26 November 1936; San Giovanni in Persiceto, Italy
- Died: 5 August 2023 (aged 86)
- Occupation: Comic artist

Giuseppe Montanari (26 November 1936 – 5 August 2023) was an Italian comic artist.

== Life and career ==
Born in San Giovanni in Persiceto, after graduating from the liceo scientifico Montanari started his career in 1954, collaborating with the graphic studio of Roy D'Amy and illustrating western series for the comic magazines I tre Bill, Cucciolo and Tiramolla. He then collaborated with Editoriale Corno and Lanciostory, and also illustrated adult comics for Edifumetto.

In the late 1970s Montanari entered Sergio Bonelli Editore, first collaborating with Il Piccolo Ranger, and since 1986 becoming one of the major artists of the Dylan Dog series, of which he illustrated over one hundred comic books, including 27 comic books of the regular series. Since 2021 he was cover artist of Dylan Dog Oldboy. Other Montanari's collaborations include Martin Mystère, Il Giornalino, L'Avventuroso, Corriere dei Piccoli, Skorpio and Intrepido.

Montanari died on 5 August 2023, at the age of 86.
