= Batman Family =

1975–78 DC Comics anthology series

- Various members of the Batman Family on the cover of Batman Family #17 (May 1978). Art by Michael Kaluta and Tatjana Wood

Publication information
- Publisher: DC Comics
- Schedule: Bi-monthly
- Format: Ongoing series
- Publication date: September–October 1975 – October–November 1978
- No. of issues: 20, then 15 more in Detective Comics #481–495 (December 1978/January 1979 – November 1980)
- Main character(s): Batman; Batgirl; Robin

Creative team
- Written by: List: Batman Family: Cary Bates, Gerry Conway, Paul Levitz, Elliot S. Maggin, Dennis O'Neil, David Vern Reed, Bob Rozakis Batman: Family: John Francis Moore
- Penciller: List: Batman Family: Jim Aparo, Bob Brown, Danny Bulanadi, Howard Chaykin, José Delbo, Lee Elias, José Luis García-López, Michael Golden, Mike Grell, Don Heck, Pablo Marcos, Don Newton, Irv Novick, Juan Ortiz, Carl Potts, Marshall Rogers, Joe Staton, Curt Swan Batman: Family: Stefano Gaudiano, Rick Hoberg, Steve Lieber
- Inker: List: Batman Family: Jim Aparo, Terry Austin, Tex Blaisdell, John Celardo, Vince Colletta, Joe Giella, Michael Golden, Dave Hunt, Bob Layton, Frank McLaughlin, Bruce Patterson, Josef Rubinstein, P. Craig Russell, Bob Smith, Romeo Tanghal, Bob Wiacek Batman: Family: Stefano Gaudiano, Rick Hoberg, Steve Lieber
- Editor: List: Batman Family: Julius Schwartz #1–16 Al Milgrom #17–20 Batman: Family: Matt Idelson #1–8

Batman Family is an American comic book anthology series published by the comic book publishing company DC Comics which ran from 1975 to 1978, primarily featuring stories starring supporting characters to the superhero Batman. An eight-issue miniseries called Batman: Family was published from December 2002 to February 2003.

The term "Batman Family" (or the shortened "Bat-Family") is most commonly used as the informal name for Batman's closest allies, generally masked vigilantes operating in Gotham City or simply "Gotham".

== Publication history ==
The Batman Family comic book series ran for 20 issues from September–October 1975 to October–November 1978 and featured solo and team-up stories starring Batgirl and Robin. The lead story in the first issue teaming Batgirl and Robin was originally intended for publication in an issue of 1st Issue Special. The series additionally featured reprints of Golden Age and Silver Age stories. Many issues of Batman Family featured Batman supporting characters such as Alfred Pennyworth, Vicki Vale, the Elongated Man, the Huntress, and Ace the Bat-Hound. Writer Bob Rozakis introduced the Duela Dent character in issue #6 (July–August 1976) and revived the original Batwoman in issue #10 (March–April 1977). The series began featuring only new material as of issue #11 (May–June 1977) and the Man-Bat began appearing as a regular feature. Batman Family converted to the Dollar Comics format with issue #17 (April–May 1978).

DC published several other ... Family titles concurrent with Batman Family. These included The Superman Family (1974–82), Super-Team Family (1975–1978) and Tarzan Family (1975–76). As a rule, DC's ... Family titles contained mostly reprints, and featured a higher page count (and higher price) than DC's normal books. Its final issue, #20 (Oct.–Nov. 1978), was published without any advertisements.

=== Merger with Detective Comics ===
In 1978, after the DC Implosion, it was decided that DC Comics' long-running flagship title Detective Comics was to be terminated with #480. The decision was overturned, following strenuous arguments on behalf of saving the title within the DC office.

Despite being the better-selling title, Batman Family was instead merged with Detective, converting that series into a $1.00 68-page giant as of Detective Comics #481 (Dec. 1978-Jan. 1979). This arrangement lasted 15 issues. With issue #496 (Nov. 1980) Detective Comics reverted to its traditional size and price — thus effectively cancelling Batman Family for good.

=== 2002–2003 series ===
Batman: Family was an eight-issue miniseries published from December 2002 to February 2003 and written by John Francis Moore. Issues #1-6 were illustrated by Stefano Gaudiano and Rick Hoberg. Steve Lieber replaced Hoberg on issues #7 and 8.

== Collected editions ==
- Batgirl: The Greatest Stories Ever Told includes Batgirl stories from Batman Family #1 and 9, 160 pages, December 2010, ISBN 978-1401229245
- Huntress: Dark Knight Daughter includes the Huntress stories from Batman Family #18–20, 224 pages, December 2006, ISBN 978-1401209131
- Batgirl : The Bronze Age Omnibus Volume 1 includes stories from Batman Family #1, 3-7 and 10-11, 504 pages, December 2017, ISBN 978-1401276409
- Batgirl : The Bronze Age Omnibus Volume 2 includes stories from Batman Family #12-20, 576 pages, April 2019, ISBN 978-1401288419
- Robin : The Bronze Age Omnibus includes stories from Batman Family #1, 3-9 and 11-20, 912 pages, March 2020, ISBN 978-1779500854

== See also ==
- List of Batman supporting characters
