= Starfire (Star Hunters) =

- Cover of Starfire #1, art by Ernie Chan.

Publication information
- Publisher: DC Comics
- First appearance: Starfire #1 (August 1976)
- Created by: David Michelinie; Mike Vosburg

In-story information
- Alter ego: Starfire
- Place of origin: Pytharia
- Partnerships: Booster Gold
- Abilities: Trained swordswoman, archer, and tracker

Starfire is a fictional character appearing in publications by DC Comics. She first appeared in Starfire #1 (August 1976), and was created by David Michelinie and Mike Vosburg.

== Development ==
Co-creator, David Michelinie discussed the character's creation: "As I recall, I was asked by [editor] Joe Orlando to come up with a female sword-and-sorcery character to be DCs answer to Red Sonja. It's always fun and challenging to create new characters, especially when you get to create a new world to put them in. But I was already writing a fairly traditional sword-and-sorcery book at the time in Claw the Unconquered, and I also had no desire to [copy] Red Sonja and simply put new names on the characters. So I came up with the sword-and-science angle, putting the series more in the realm of fantasy than barbarian action. I wanted a tone that was more in line with Edgar Rice Burroughs' Mars and Venus books, than with Robert E. Howard's muscle and magic epics".

Co-creator Mike Vosburg, discussed designing the character: "One of my big influences was Guido Crepax and his character Valentina. One of the costumes he dressed Valentina in was the inspiration for Starfire's costume".

== Fictional character biography ==
=== Origin ===
The first DC comics character to use the name Starfire was Leonid Kovar, a Russian superhero who first appeared in Teen Titans #18 (1968). The second character to bear the name, and the first female, was a dark-haired, sword-wielding alien woman. The character's series took place on a strange alien world. Starfire was the first DC heroine to receive her own title since Supergirl in 1972. Her series lasted only eight issues. According to this original series, Starfire's world was long ago involved in a civil war between two castes: the warrior-priests and the Lightning Lords (scientists). Unable to prevail upon each other alone, each caste summoned an alien race to serve their cause. The warrior-priests summoned the Mygorg and the Lightning Lords the Yorgs. The two alien races were hereditary enemies and indeed resumed their war in their new planet. However, both turned the tables on their summoners and intended masters by enslaving them. The world was divided among the two, Mygorg and Yorg, which continued to war against each other. The original human-like inhabitants continued to survive in slavery. Starfire was born as the daughter of two slaves of different skin color. Her father was "yellow" and her mother "white". Both slaves belonged to the Mygorg. Sookarooth, King of the Mygorg took notice of the young girl of mixed heritage and beautiful appearance. He arranged for her to be raised free and educated in his own palace, Castle Mollachon.

When Starfire reached her eighteenth birthday, Sookarooth announced her to be his future mate. She fled in disgust but was pursued by the royal forces. She was saved by Dagan, a warrior-priest. The two became lovers and Dagan trained her as a warrior. Starfire became skilled in swordsmanship, archery, tracking, and other skills typical to a warrior-priest. Their shared life ended when Dagan was captured by Sookarooth. He was at first tortured and then executed. A vengeful Starfire returned to Castle Mollachon and raised its slaves in revolt. She slew Sookareth herself and then vowed to free her people from slavery. The following issues had Starfire recruiting additional followers to her side and seeking more effective weapons against the Mygorg, the Yorg, and a number of hostile local factions. The series ended before a resolution could be reached.

=== Star Hunters ===
In Star Hunters #7 (Oct.–Nov. 1978), Starfire and Claw the Unconquered were revealed as two of the "eternal champions of the Sornaii" on the world of Pytharia (pseudo Earth). The implications of this revelation were never explored as the Star Hunters series ended in a cliffhanger.

=== Time Masters: Vanishing Point ===
Starfire returns in Time Masters: Vanishing Point #2 where she meets Booster Gold.

== Other versions ==
- In Swamp Thing #163 (February 1996), Starfire and Claw were among several sword and sorcery characters attempting to escape Nightmaster. That storyline apparently revealed that they were all creations of Nightmaster's subconscious mind. Later appearances by both Nightmaster and the other sword and sorcery characters have chosen to ignore this storyline and its implications.
- In Starman #55 (July 1999), Jack Knight and Mikaal Tomas are reported to have saved Starfire from Jarko the space pirate, but the issue featured the incident retold in three different flashback versions by Space Cabbie, Space Ranger, and Ultra the Multi-Alien. Each version involved different Starfires. One version featured this Starfire while the other two featured Leonid Kovar and Koriand'r respectively.
