= Beowulf (DC Comics) =

- Beowulf and Nan-Zee, cover of Beowulf #2; artist Ricardo Villamonte.

Publication information
- Publisher: DC Comics
- First appearance: Beowulf: Dragon Slayer #1 (May 1975)
- Created by: Michael Uslan (writer); Ricardo Villamonte (artist)

In-story information
- Alter ego: Beowulf
- Place of origin: Daneland
- Notable aliases: Prince of Geats
- Abilities: Expert swordsman, superhuman strength and speed.

Beowulf is a fictional character of the swords and sorcery genre published by DC Comics. The character debuted in Beowulf: Dragon Slayer #1 (May 1975), and was created by Michael Uslan and Ricardo Villamonte. The character is based on the Anglo-Saxon mythic hero Beowulf, first depicted in the Nowell Codex.

== Publication history ==
The tale of DC Comics' version of Beowulf starts out very close to the mythic Bēowulf, but later veers wildly away into the regions of science fiction and faustian fantasy. The Beowulf title only lasted six issues, running from May 1975 to March 1976.

== Fictional character biography ==
Under instructions from a being known as "The Shaper", Beowulf travels to Castle Hrothgar in Daneland, to fight the monster Grendel. On the way there Beowulf and his men take a detour into the Underworld where they rescue Nan-Zee, a Swedish scylfing warrior, from the Demons who have been controlling her. Beowulf, Nan-Zee, and his companions Wiglaf and Hondscio continue onwards to Castle Hrothgar, but are again detoured, ending up in a bog where they battle Swamp Men. Meanwhile, Grendel and his mother reveal to the reader that they are descendants of Cain. Somehow, Beowulf and friends fall through a dimensional gateway beneath a patch of quicksand into a fiery underworld they refer to as Hell.

At a later point in the series Beowulf discovers that the only way to slay Grendel is with the nectar of the Zumak Fruit. Along the way he encounters Dracula, a mysterious Lost Tribe of Israel, Ulysses accompanied by a troop of anonymous Greek Warriors, Egyptian/Sumerian space aliens straight out of Chariots of the Gods, and the lost city of Atlantis.

In the final issue of the series Beowulf and Nan-Zee travel from Atlantis to Crete, where they finally get their hands on some Zumak fruit in the labyrinth of King Minos where Beowulf fights a Minotaur which is being controlled by Satan. Because he has made Dracula his heir over Grendel, Grendel kills Satan by plunging a stalactite into his back. The Minotaur dies, and Beowulf eats some Zumak fruit; the fruit grants him supernatural strength on par with Grendel. Beowulf and Nan-Zee then make their way back to Daneland in order to slay Grendel who has taken his place as king of the underworld.

=== Wonder Woman ===
Beowulf's first appearance in over thirty years occurs in Wonder Woman #20 (July 2008), where Wonder Woman and Stalker recruit him and Claw the Unconquered for a mission to slay the Demon Lord Dgrth.

=== The New 52 ===
Beowulf is featured in a backup story in the ongoing series Sword of Sorcery beginning in September 2012. The story is written by Tony Bedard. In this version Beowulf lives in a post-apocalyptic future where the society has reverted to ancient times. Created as a super-soldier he kills an entire group of warriors sent to find him, but spares a young kid called Wiglaf who explains that he is there with a message from King Hrothgar, begging Beowulf to come north and slay the monster Grendel that plagues his mead hall nightly. Beowulf is uninterested until he is told that the King is a great general. Upon confronting the creature Wiglaf and Beowulf discover the latter to be his brother and that both were created by Basilisk leader Regulus who had seen the threat of metahumans and aliens growing on earth, and schemed to empower average humans.

== Powers and abilities ==
- After consuming the nectar of the Zumak Fruit, Beowulf gains superhuman strength and speed equal to the demon Grendel.
- Beowulf is an accomplished swordsman and unarmed combatant.

== Other versions ==
- A version of Grendel who is revealed to be the son of Vandal Savage debuted in Secret Six #12.
