= Paul Levitz =

American comic book editor (born 1956)

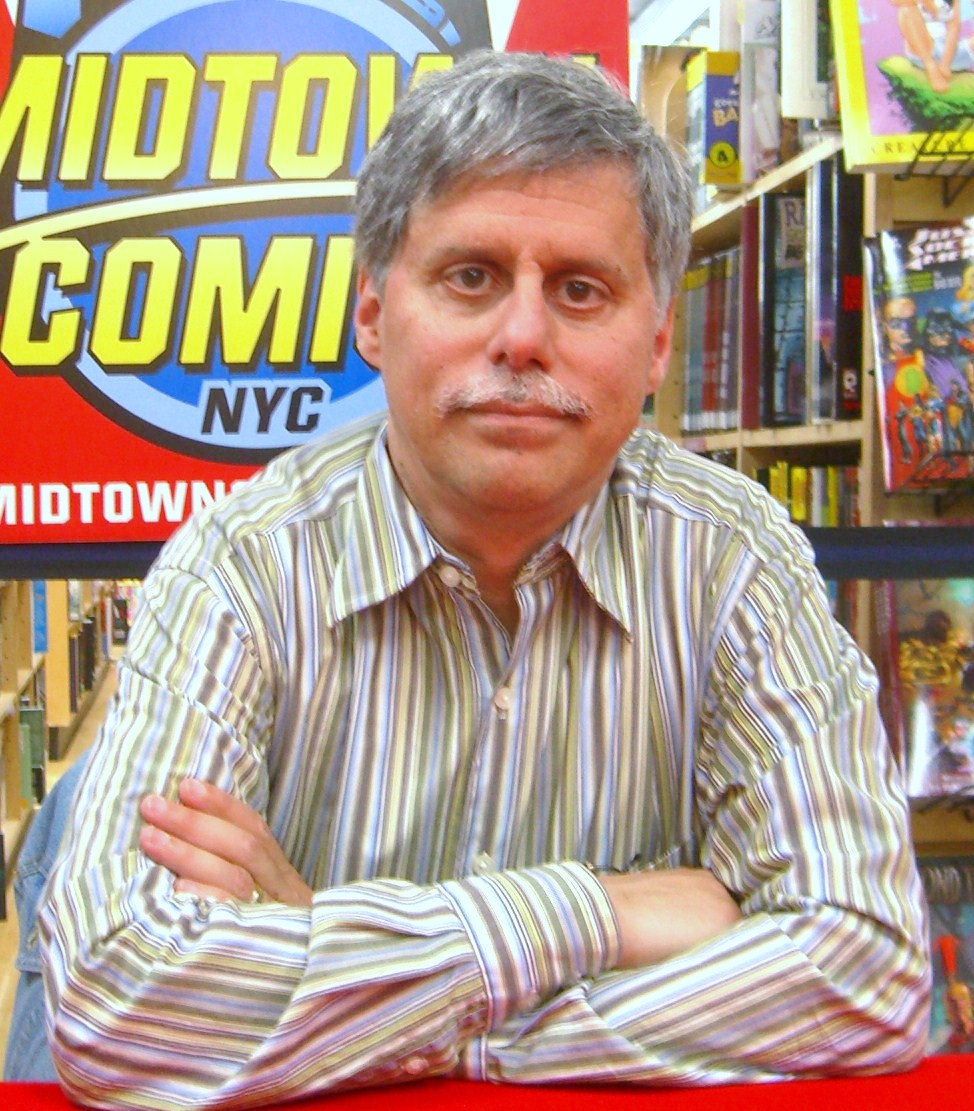
- Levitz at Midtown Comics in Manhattan
- Born: October 21, 1956 (age 70)
- Areas: Writer, Editor, Publisher
- Notable works: Legion of Super-Heroes, Batman
- Awards: Inkpot Award (2002)

Paul Levitz (/ˈlɛvɪts/; born October 21, 1956) is an American comic book writer, editor and executive. The president of DC Comics from 2002 to 2009, he worked for the company for over 35 years in a wide variety of roles. Along with publisher Jenette Kahn and managing editor Dick Giordano, Levitz was responsible for hiring such writers as Marv Wolfman and Alan Moore, artists such as George Pérez, Keith Giffen, and John Byrne, and editor Karen Berger, who contributed to the 1980s revitalization of the company's line of comic book heroes.

== Early life ==
Levitz was born and raised in East Flatbush, Brooklyn, New York. His father was a clerk for an industrial hardware store, and his mother was a bookkeeper. He was an avid reader as a child, and read the works of writers including Agatha Christie, Dorothy L. Sayers, and Ed McBain. He also read comics, citing the first he could remember buying off of a newsstand being the first team-up between the Justice League and the Justice Society. He was notably a fan of Superman and the Legion of Super-Heroes. Most of what he read was from DC Comics, but cited Marvel Comics' Avengers as a strong influence on his writing.

He attended Stuyvesant High School, during which time he revived the defunct comic news fanzine, The Comic Reader, which according to Levitz, was the first regularly published comics industry news fanzine. Under Levitz's editorship The Comic Reader won two Best Fanzine Comic Art Fan Awards. One of Levitz's teachers, Frank McCourt, was impressed enough with Levitz's work that he arranged for Levitz to appear on McCourt's brother Malachy's radio show.

== Career ==
During the course of his research for The Comic Reader, Levitz became well known at the offices of DC Comics, where in December 1972, editor Joe Orlando gave him his first freelance work, initially writing text pages and letter pages, and later working as a per diem assistant editor before writing stories. Levitz later studied business at New York University but had taken no formal education in writing, other than a journalism course. He dropped out after three years in order to concentrate on his writing career.

After serving as Joe Orlando's assistant editor, in 1976 Levitz "fulfilled a lifelong dream" by becoming the editor of Adventure Comics on the eve of his 20th birthday. In 1978, he succeeded Julius Schwartz as the editor of the Batman line of comics.

As a writer, Levitz is best known for his work on the title The Legion of Super-Heroes, which he wrote from 1977 to 1979 and 1981–1989. Levitz wrote All-New Collectors' Edition #C-55 (1978), a treasury-sized special drawn by Mike Grell, in which longtime Legion members Saturn Girl and Lightning Lad were married. Levitz and artists James Sherman and Joe Staton worked on "Earthwar", a five-issue storyline in Superboy and the Legion of Super-Heroes #241–245 (July–Nov. 1978). He and Keith Giffen produced "The Great Darkness Saga", one of the best known Legion stories, in Legion of Super-Heroes vol. 2, #290–294. Comics historian Les Daniels observed that "Working with artist Keith Giffen, Levitz completed the transformation of Legion into a science-fiction saga of considerable scope and depth." In August 1984, Levitz and Giffen launched a new Legion of Super-Heroes series.

With artist Steve Ditko, Levitz co-created the characters Stalker and the Prince Gavyn version of Starman. He wrote the Justice Society series in All Star Comics during the late 1970s and co-created the Earth-2 Huntress with artist Joe Staton. He and Staton provided the JSA with an origin story in DC Special #29. Lucien the Librarian, a character later used in Neil Gaiman's The Sandman series, was created by Levitz and artist Nestor Redondo. Levitz was one of the contributors to the DC Challenge limited series in 1986.

Levitz eventually became an editor, and served as vice president and executive vice president, before assuming the role of president and publisher in 2002. Levitz consciously chose the combined title instead of "editor-in-chief", citing the negative results of the title he saw during Jim Shooter's tenure at Marvel and his desire to stay connected to the publishing arm of DC which he had help create. In 2006, Levitz returned to writing the Justice Society with issue #82 of JSA, completing that volume before writer Geoff Johns' relaunch.

On September 9, 2009, it was announced that Levitz would step down as president and publisher of DC Comics to serve as the contributing editor and overall consultant for the newly formed DC Entertainment, and become the writer of both Adventure Comics vol. 2 and Legion of Super-Heroes vol. 6.

Levitz mentioned in an August 2010 interview that he was working on "[his] first genuine book." His 75 Years of DC Comics: The Art of Modern Mythmaking (ISBN 9783836519816) was published by Taschen America, LLC, in November 2010.

In addition to Legion of Super-Heroes, Levitz wrote the Worlds' Finest series, which was initially drawn by George Pérez and Kevin Maguire. Levitz and Keith Giffen collaborated on the Legion of Super-Heroes issues #17 and 18 in 2013. In 2015, Levitz wrote Will Eisner: Champion of the Graphic Novel, an oversized, illustrated biography/art book on Eisner's work for Abrams ComicArts. The book would garner Levitz a nomination in the 2016 Eisner Awards for “Best Comics-Related Book.” He joined the board of directors of Boom! Studios in February 2014. He wrote a new five-page story titled "The Game", which was drawn by Neal Adams, for the Action Comics: 80 Years of Superman hardcover collection.

In 2004, Levitz joined the board of the Comic Book Legal Defense Fund, a non-profit organization founded in 1986 chartered to protect the First Amendment rights of the comics community. He retired from the board in 2020.

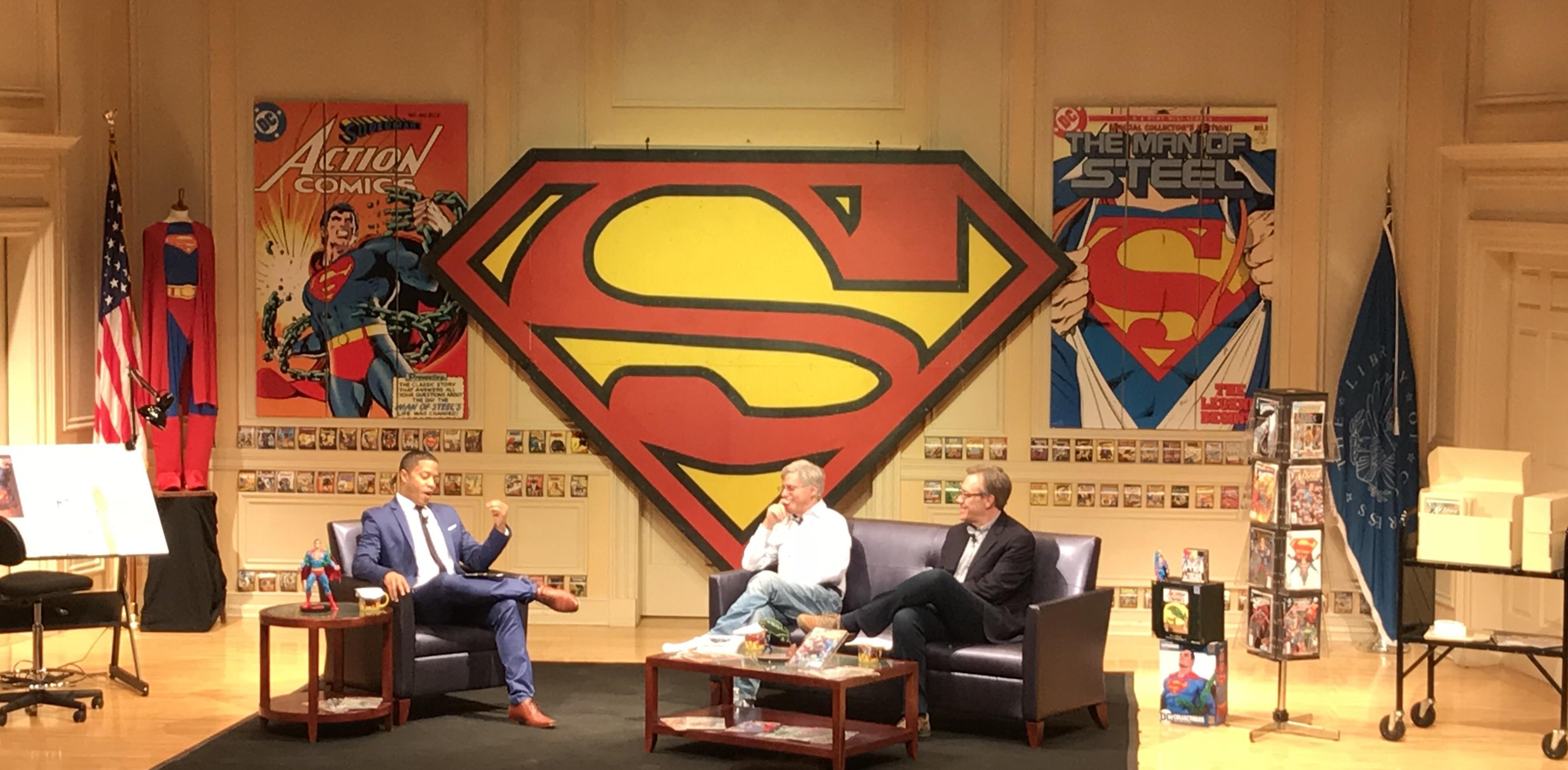
The Library of Congress hosting a discussion with Dan Jurgens and Levitz for Superman's 80th anniversary and the 1,000th issue of Action Comics.

On December 31, 2020, Levitz announced his retirement from DC via a posting on Facebook, saying it's “the end of an era for me personally, as I go off the payroll of Warner/DC after so many decades: over 47 years on 'staff', 36 of them on employment contracts.”

From January to May 2023, the 5-issue miniseries Avengers: War Across Time, which Levitz wrote, was published. It his first work for Marvel Comics, and received positive reviews.

== Awards ==
Levitz received an Inkpot Award at San Diego Comic-Con in 2002, the Bob Clampett Humanitarian Award at San Diego Comic-Con in 2008, and the "Dick Giordano Hero Initiative Humanitarian of the Year Award" in September 2013 at the Baltimore Comic-Con. He was inducted into The Will Eisner Award Hall of Fame in 2019 at San Diego Comic-Con.

== Personal life ==
Levitz is Jewish. Levitz has three children: Nicole, a public health executive; Philip, a lawyer; and Garret, who works in the entertainment industry.

Levitz has named the run of All-Star Comics featuring the Justice Society of America as his favorite. He names Roger Zelazny as his favorite science fiction writer, J. R. R. Tolkien as his favorite fantasy writer, David McCullough as his favorite history writer and Agatha Christie as his favorite mystery writer.

== Bibliography ==
=== Dark Horse ===
- Unfinished Business OGN (2021)

=== DC Comics ===
- Action Comics: 80 Years of Superman (2018)
- Adventure Comics (Aquaman) #437, 441–448, (Elongated Man) #459, (Justice Society of America) #461–466 (Starman) #467–478 (1975–1980)
- Adventure Comics vol. 2 #515–529 (2010–2011)
- All New Atom #23 (2008)
- All-New Collectors' Edition (Superboy and the Legion of Super-Heroes) #C-55 (1978)
- All Star Comics #59, 62–74 (1976–1978)
- Batman #350 (1982)
- Batman Black and White #2 (1996)
- Batman Family (Huntress) #18–20 (1978)
- Batman: Gotham Knights (Batman Black and White) #5 (2000)
- Convergence: Aquaman #2 (Doctor Fate) (2015)
- Convergence: Worlds' Finest #1–2 (2015)
- Cosmic Boy #1–4 (1986–1987)
- Darkseid Special #1 (OMAC) (2017)
- DC Challenge #4 (1986)
- DC Comics Presents #5–7, 13–14, 25, 36, 42–43, 59 (1979–1983)
- DC Comics Presents: Superman #1 (2004)
- DC Special #28–29 (1977)
- DC Special Series #1, 8, 10, 12, 21 (1977–1980)
- DC Super Stars #17
- Detective Comics #517–518 (1982)
- Doctor Fate #1–18 (2015–2016)
- Earth 2 #15.1 (2013)
- Ghosts #103, 110 (1981–1982)
- Heroes Against Hunger #1 (two pages) (1986)
- House of Mystery #251 (1977)
- Huntress vol. 3 #1–6 (2011–2012)
- Joe Kubert Presents #5 (2013)
- JSA #82–87 (2006)
- Justice League of America #147–148 (1977)
- Kamandi, The Last Boy on Earth #40, 44 (1976)
- Kamandi Challenge #12 (2018)
- Karate Kid #1 (1976)
- Legends of the DC Universe 80-Page Giant #2 (2000)
- Legion of Substitute Heroes Special #1 (1985)
- Legion of Super-Heroes vol. 2 #281–282, 284–313, Annual #1–3 (1981–1984)
- Legion of Super-Heroes vol. 3 #1–63, Annual #1–4 (1984–1989)
- Legion of Super-Heroes vol. 4 #100 (back-up story) (1998)
- Legion of Super-Heroes vol. 6 #1–16 (2010–2011)
- Legion of Super-Heroes vol. 7 #1–23, #0 (2011–2013)
- Legion: Secret Origin #1–6 (2011–2012)
- Mystery in Space #114 (1980)
- The New Teen Titans #28–33 (1987)
- Phantom Stranger #37–41 (1975–1976)
- The Saga of the Swamp Thing (Phantom Stranger) #11 (1983)
- Secret Origins vol. 2 (Shadow Lass) #8, (Phantom Stranger) #10, (Legion of Super-Heroes) #25 (1986–1988)
- Secret Origins vol. 3 #7 (Huntress), #9 (Supergirl) (2015)
- Showcase (Power Girl) #97–99, (anniversary "jam" issue) #100 (1977–1978)
- Stalker #1–4 (1975–1976)
- Superboy and the Legion of Super-Heroes #225–226, 228–231, 233–237, 239–247, 250–251 (1977–1979)
- Superman #344 (1980)
- Superman/Batman #26, 72–75, Annual #4 (2006, 2010)
- The Superman Family (Lois Lane) #212–214 (1981–1982)
- Tales of Ghost Castle #1 (1975)
- Tales of the Legion of Super-Heroes #314–325 (1984–1985, 1987)
- Teen Titans #44 (1976)
- Time Warp #1–2 (1979–1980)
- Weird Mystery Tales #15–18 (1974–1975)
- Who's Who in the Legion of Super-Heroes #1–7 (1988)
- Who's Who: The Definitive Directory of the DC Universe #3, 14–26 (1985–1987)
- Who's Who: Update '87 #1–5 (1987)
- Wonder Woman #255–258, 291–293, (Huntress) #271–287, 289–290, 294–296 (1979–1982)
- Worlds' Finest #1-32, #0, Annual #1 (2012–2015)
- Worlds' Finest: Futures End #1 (2014)

=== Marvel Comics ===
- Avengers: War Across Time #1–5 (2023)

=== Titan Books ===
- Icons: The DC Comics and WildStorm Art of Jim Lee (exclusive Legion of Superheroes story) (2010)

=== Valiant ===
- Visitor #1–6 (2019–2021)

== See also ==
- "Shoot" – a Hellblazer story cancelled by Levitz

Preceded by Jenette Kahn	Publisher of DC Comics; 1989–2009	Succeeded by Dan DiDio and Jim Lee
Preceded by Jenette Kahn	President of DC Comics; 2002–2009	Succeeded by Diane Nelson
Preceded by Joe Orlando	Adventure Comics editor 1977–1979	Succeeded by Ross Andru
Preceded by Jim Shooter	Superboy and the Legion of Super-Heroes writer 1977–1979	Succeeded by Gerry Conway
Preceded by Dennis O'Neil	The Brave and the Bold editor 1978–1981	Succeeded by Dick Giordano
Preceded by Julius Schwartz	Detective Comics editor 1979–1981	Succeeded by Dick Giordano
Preceded by Julius Schwartz	Batman editor 1979–1981	Succeeded by Dick Giordano
Preceded by Roy Thomas	Legion of Super-Heroes writer 1981–1989	Succeeded by Keith Giffen and Tom and Mary Bierbaum
Preceded by Marv Wolfman	The New Teen Titans writer 1987	Succeeded by Marv Wolfman
