= Patrick Cothias =

French comics writer

Patrick Cothiasis (born 31 December 1948 in Paris) is a French comics writer. A pillar of the "Vécu" collection of the Glénat editions from the beginning of the 1980s to 2004, he created many historical comics there.

Cothias is particularly known for having published the cycle of the Seven Lives of the Hawk in which André Juillard (Masquerouge, Les Sept Vies de l'Épervier, Plume au vent), Jean-Paul Dethorey (Burnt Heart), among others, collaborated, Brice Goepfert (Le Fou du Roy), Marc-Renier (The Iron Mask) and David Prudhomme (Ninon Secret).

Cothias has also written historical adventure series for Philippe Adamov (Le Vent des Dieux, Les Eaux de Mortelune), Michel Rouge (Les Héros cavaliers) and created several series set in contemporary times, such as the thriller Le Lièvre de March with Antonio Parras.

Since the mid-2000s, he has worked mainly for Éditions Bamboo, except for his cover of Seven Lives of the Hawk which Dargaud published a volume in 2014.
