= Sword of Sorcery =

Sword-and-sorcery comics anthology

- Issue #1 cover

Publication information
- Publisher: DC Comics
- Publication date: Vol. 1: March 1973 - December 1973; Vol. 2: November 2012 - July 2013
- No. of issues: Vol. 1: 5 Vol. 2: 9 (#1-8 and #0)
- Main character(s): Vol. 1: Fafhrd and the Gray Mouser; Vol. 2: Amethyst, Princess of Gemworld, Beowulf, Stalker

Creative team
- Written by: Vol. 1: Denny O'Neil; Vol. 2: Christy Marx, Tony Bedard
- Artist(s): Vol. 1: Howard Chaykin, Walt Simonson, Jim Starlin; Vol. 2: Aaron Lopresti, Jesus Saiz

Sword of Sorcery was an American sword-and-sorcery comics anthology featuring Fafhrd and the Gray Mouser, heroes and rogues created by Fritz Leiber. Published bi-monthly by DC Comics, it ran for five issues in 1973, with a cover price of 20¢. The title was written by Denny O'Neil and featured art by Howard Chaykin, Walt Simonson, and Jim Starlin. The book was cancelled after five issues due to bad sales.

In June 2012, the series returned with a revival of Amethyst, Princess of Gemworld by writer Christy Marx and artist Aaron Lopresti. The title included a backup feature starring Beowulf written by Tony Bedard and drawn by Jesus Saiz.

== Publishing history ==
=== Wonder Woman ===
A prequel to the series appears the Wonder Woman series, in the last panel of #201 and all of #202. In this story, written by Samuel R. Delany, Fafhrd and the Gray Mouser team up with Diana Prince (Wonder Woman minus her super-powers), her kung-fu mentor I Ching, and Catwoman, to defeat the dimension-spanning wizard Gahwron.

=== Original series ===
The first issue featured an adaptation of Fritz Leiber's story, "The Price of Pain Ease" by writer Dennis O'Neil and artists Howard Chaykin and the Crusty Bunkers. It featured a cover by Michael Kaluta. The same creative team adapted Leiber's story, "Thieves' House" in issue #2. O'Neil wrote an original story in #3 and then adapted "The Cloud of Hate" and "The Sunken Land" in issues #4 and #5 respectively.

== The New 52 ==
The series was relaunched with issue #0 in September 2012 (cover dated November 2012), as part of DC's The New 52 line. This series was written by Christy Marx with art by Aaron Lopresti and featured the adventures of Amethyst, Princess of Gemworld. A backup story written by Tony Bedard and drawn by Jesus Saiz told the story of Beowulf. DC cancelled the new series as of issue #8 (July 2013).

== Collected editions ==
- Fafhrd and the Gray Mouser: The Cloud of Hate and Other Stories collects Sword of Sorcery vol. 1 #1–5, 128 pages, June 2016, ISBN 978-1-61655-985-4
- Sword of Sorcery Vol. 1: Amethyst collects Sword of Sorcery vol. 2 #0–8, 238 pages, September 2013, ISBN 978-1401241001
