= Ernie Chan =

Chinese-American comic book artist (1940-2012)

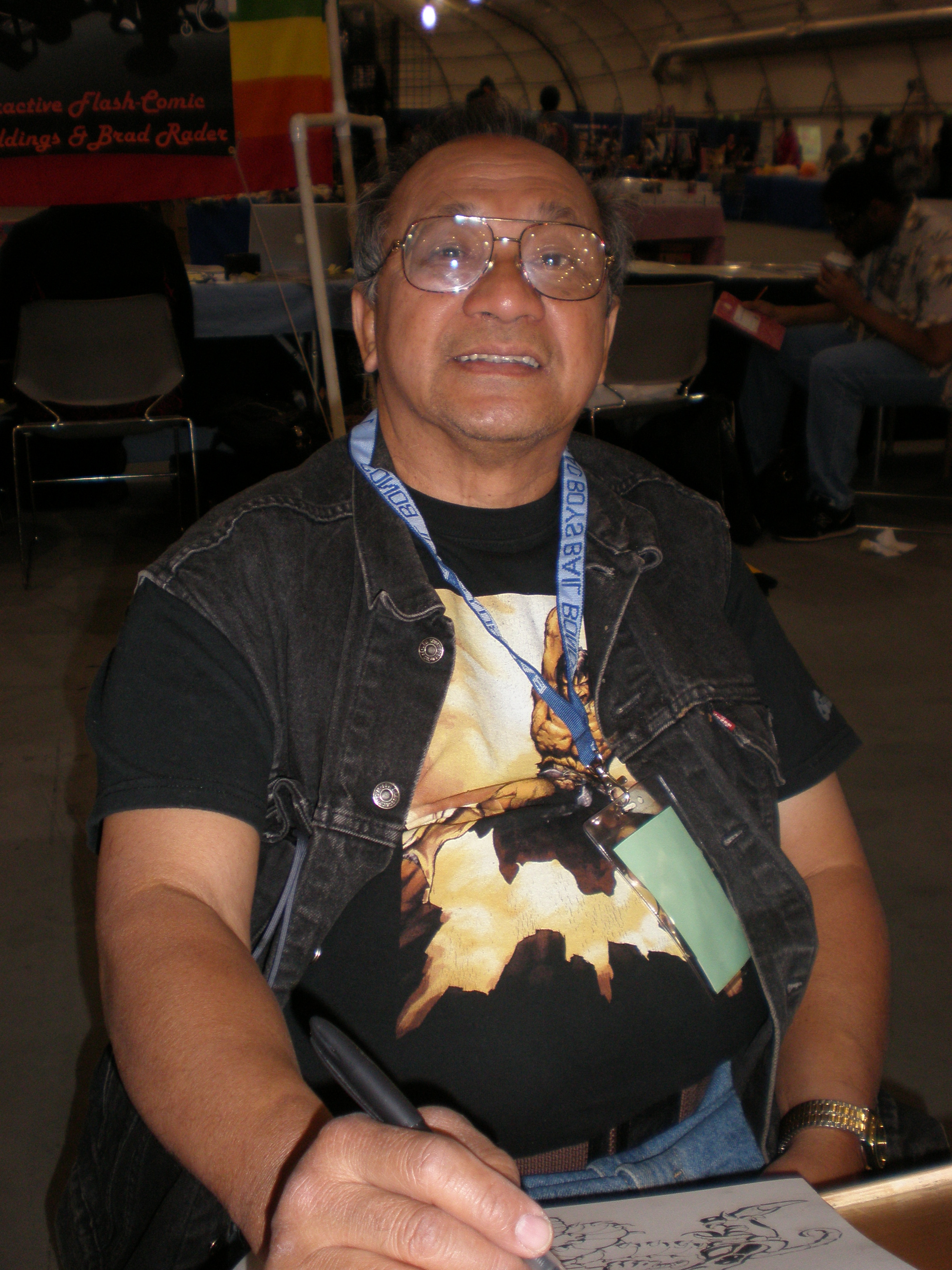
- Chan in May 2009.
- Born: Ernesto Chua; July 27, 1940 The Philippines
- Died: May 16, 2012 (aged 71) Oakland, California, U.S.
- Areas: Penciller, Inker
- Pseudonym: Ernie Chua
- Notable works: Batman; Conan the Barbarian; Detective Comics; Kull the Conqueror; Savage Sword of Conan
- Awards: Inkpot Award (1980); Inkwell Awards (2024) Joe Sinnott Hall of Fame

Ernesto Chan (July 27, 1940 – May 16, 2012), born and sometimes credited as Ernie Chua, was a Filipino-American comics artist, known for work published by Marvel Comics and DC Comics, including many Marvel issues of series featuring Conan the Barbarian. Chan also had a long tenure on Batman and Detective Comics. Other than his work on Batman, Chan primarily focused on non-superhero characters, staying mostly in the genres of horror, war, and sword and sorcery.

== Biography ==
His legal name was originally recorded as Ernie Chua, because, as he said, there was "a typographical error on my birth certificate that I had to use until I had a chance to change it to 'Chan' when I got my [U.S.] citizenship in '76." He migrated to the United States in 1970 and became a citizen in 1976. He was credited as Ernie Chua in his early career, but later used Ernie Chan professionally.

Chan entered the American comics industry in 1972 with DC Comics as a penciler on horror/mystery titles such as Ghosts, House of Mystery, and The Unexpected. By 1974, he was working regularly for Marvel Comics on Conan the Barbarian, inking pencil art by John Buscema. He also inked the art of Buscema's brother Sal Buscema on The Incredible Hulk.

From 1975–1976, Chan worked exclusively for DC including the artwork for Claw the Unconquered which was written by David Michelinie. While working on the Detective Comics series, he drew the first appearances of Captain Stingaree in issue #460 (June 1976) and the Black Spider in #463 (Sept. 1976). Under the name Chua, he was DC Comics' primary cover artist from approximately 1975 to 1977.

With Marvel Chan also pencilled several issues of Conan and Doctor Strange, and worked on Kull the Destroyer in 1977 and Power Man and Iron Fist in the 1980s. From about 1978 onward, he worked almost exclusively for Marvel and focused on Conan, including the annuals, in the 1980s.

In the early 1990s he joined Sega, providing character design and art for video games such as Eternal Champions.

In 2002, he retired except for commissioned artwork. Chan returned to comics to draw writer Andrew Zar's adult-oriented webcomic The Vat #1 in 2009.

== Personal life ==
Chan was based in Oakland, California, and had three children; his daughter Cleo Caron Chan was born April 25, 1978. His daughter Kate Ann Chan was born on July 8, 1980. Ernie Chan died on May 16, 2012, after a nearly yearlong battle with cancer.

== Awards ==
Ernie Chan received an Inkpot Award in 1980.

In 2024, Chan was posthumously inducted into the Inkwell Awards Joe Sinnott Hall of Fame.

== Bibliography ==
Comics work (interior pencil art, except where noted) includes:

=== DarkBrain ===
- The Vat (2009)

=== DC Comics ===
- Adventure Comics (Spectre) #437–438; (Seven Soldiers of Victory) #441 (1975)
- Batman #262–264, 267, 269–270, 273–283 (full art); #272 (inks over Jose Luis Garcia-Lopez) (1975–1977)
- Batman: No Man's Land Gallery (1999)
- Captain Carrot and His Amazing Zoo Crew! #18 (1983)
- Claw the Unconquered #1–7 (1975–1976)
- Dark Mansion of Forbidden Love #4 (1972)
- DC Special Series (The Unexpected) #4 (1977)
- Detective Comics (Elongated Man) #444; (Batman) #447–449, 451–453, 456, 458, 460–466 (full art); #454, 458 (inks over Jose Luis Garcia-Lopez) (1974–1976)
- Forbidden Tales of Dark Mansion #8 (1972)
- Ghosts #4, 10–11, 14, 21, 27, 30, 70 (1972–1978)
- G.I. Combat #209 (1978)
- House of Mystery #203, 251, 254–257, 290 (1972–1981)
- House of Secrets #117, 124, 126, 129, 133, 137, 141, 143–144, 147–148 (full art); #148 (inks over Steve Ditko) (1974–1977)
- The Joker #3 (1975)
- Jonah Hex #6–9 (1977–1978)
- Kamandi #47 (full art); #49 (inks over Dick Ayers) (1976–1977)
- Sandman #2–3 (1975)
- Secret Society of Super Villains #4 (1976)
- Secrets of Haunted House #1, 5 (1975–1976)
- Secrets of Sinister House #16 (1974)
- Superman (Fabulous World of Krypton) #282 (1974)
- Swamp Thing #24 (1976)
- Tales of Ghost Castle #3 (1975)
- Teen Titans (Lilith) #43 (1973)
- The Unexpected #134, 146, 149, 151, 170, 182, 188 (full art); #144 (inks over John Calnan) (1972–1978)
- Weird Mystery Tales #14 (1974)
- Weird War Tales #17, 24, 26, 29–30, 42, 44, 49, 53–54, 58–59 (1973–1978)
- The Witching Hour #40, 62 (1974–1976)
- World's Finest Comics (Superman and Batman) #242 (1976)

=== Marvel Comics ===
- Captain Marvel #24 (inks over Wayne Boring) (1973)
- Chamber of Chills #3 (1973)
- Conan the Barbarian #87, Annual #9–11 (full art); #26–36, 40–43, 70–86, 88–118, 131, 134, 142, 144, 147–153, 156–157, 168, 175, 177–178, 181–185, 187–190, 249–250, 252, 254, 275 (inks over John Buscema, Howard Chaykin, Gil Kane and Mike Doherty, 1973–1993)
- Daredevil #96–98 (inks over Gene Colan) (1973)
- Doc Savage #2 (inks over Ross Andru) (1972)
- Doc Savage vol. 2 #8 (1977)
- Doctor Strange vol. 2 #27–29 (inks over Tom Sutton) (1978)
- Dracula Lives #8 (full art); #4 (inks over Mike Ploog), #6-7 (inks over Gene Colan) (1974)
- Further Adventures of Indiana Jones #18 (inks over Herb Trimpe) (1984)
- Haunt of Horror #1 (1974)
- The Hulk! #12 (inks over Ron Wilson) (1978)
- Incredible Hulk #210-212, 214-217, 219-220 (inks over Sal Buscema), #218 (inks over George Tuska and Keith Pollard) (1977-1978)
- John Carter, Warlord of Mars Annual #2 (full art); #26 (inks over Mike Vosburg), Annual #1 (inks over Sal Buscema) (1977-1979)
- Journey into Mystery #3 (inks over Sam Kweskin), #5 (inks over Win Mortimer) (1973)
- Ka-Zar #20 (inks over Val Mayerik) (1977)
- King Conan #5, 10 (1981–1982)
- Kull the Conqueror vol. 2 #4 (1984)
- Kull the Destroyer #21–29 (1977–1978)
- Marvel Fanfare (Black Knight) #52 (inks over Scott Hampton) (1990)
- Marvel Comics Presents (Starfox) #65 (1990)
- Marvel Two-in-One #35–36 (1978)
- Master of Kung Fu #122 (inks over William Johnson) (1983)
- Mighty Thor Annual #14 (inks over Bob Layton) (1989)
- Namor, the Sub-Mariner #51 (inks over Aaron Lopresti) (1994)
- Nightmask #9 (inks over Mark Bagley) (1987)
- Our Love Story #21 (inks over Jim Mooney) (1973)
- Pizzazz #1-2, 5-6, 8 (Tarzan) (inks over John Buscema) (1977-1978)
- Power Man and Iron Fist #94–100 (1983)
- Real Heroes #2 (inks over Bob Gordon) (1994)
- Red Sonja vol.3 #4 (inks over Mary Wilshire) (1984)
- Savage Sword of Conan #29, 35, 68, 71, 76, 111, 113, 116, 119, 122–123, 137, 155, 158, 160–161, 164, 172–173, 177, 179, 183, 185, 187, 212, 214, 227 (full art); #62–64, 66, 71–72, 77–79, 81, 87, 95, 99–100, 102, 104, 108–109, 132-135, 137–142, 144, 146–148, 150–152, 166–169, 178–179, 185, 191–200, 202–206, 212 (inks over John Buscema, Ernie Colón, Val Mayerik, Mike Docherty, Gary Kwapisz) (1978–1994)
- Spectacular Spider-Man #15 (inks over Sal Buscema) (1978)
- Spider-Woman #29 (1980)
- Supernatural Thrillers #3 (inks over Gil Kane) (1973)
- Tales of the Zombie #4 (1974)
- Thor #336 (full art); #261, Annual #7 (inks over Walt Simonson) (1977-1983)
- Tomb of Dracula #8 (inks over Gene Colan) (1973)
- Unknown Worlds of Science Fiction #1 (inks over Ross Andru) (1975)
- Vampire Tales #5 (Morbius) (inks over Rich Buckler) (1974)
- What If...? #13 (inks over John Buscema) (1979)
- Worlds Unknown #2 (inks over Val Mayerik), #6 (inks over Dick Ayers) (1973-1974)

=== Warren Publishing ===
- Creepy #88 (inks over Carmine Infantino) (1977)

Preceded by Irv Novick	Batman artist 1975–1977	Succeeded by Romeo Tanghal
Preceded by Jim Aparo	Detective Comics artist 1975–1976	Succeeded by John Calnan
