= Claw the Unconquered =

Sword and sorcery character from DC Comics

Claw
- Cover to Claw #1 (June 1975).

Publication information
- Publisher: DC Comics
- First appearance: Claw the Unconquered #1 (May–June 1975)
- Created by: David Michelinie (writer); Ernie Chan (artist)

In-story information
- Alter ego: Valcan Scaramax
- Place of origin: Pytharia
- Abilities: Master swordsman, magical claw on right arm

Claw is a sword and sorcery superhero in comic books published by DC Comics. He first appeared in Claw the Unconquered #1 (June 1975), in which he was created by writer David Michelinie and designed by artist Ernie Chan.

Similar in many ways to Robert E. Howard's Conan the Barbarian (and, more particularly, Marvel Comics's depiction of him), Claw is a wanderer and a barbarian in an apparently prehistoric age who battles various wizards, thieves, monsters, and warriors who cross his path.

== Creation ==
Co-Creator Ernie Chan spoke on the creation of the character stating,

"Yes, I agree that Claw was a knock-off of Conan at the beginning. But if Claw had been given a longer run, I was pretty sure it would have branched off to something all its own."

== Publication history ==
Claw the Unconquered #1 debuted in mid-1975, a period when DC Comics launched a record number of new titles on to the comic book market (16 new titles debuted in 1975 alone). Claw was one of several of these new series which were set in the "fantasy" or "sword and sorcery" genre. Other such titles include Warlord, Stalker, Starfire, Nightmaster, Tor and Beowulf, Dragon Slayer. At the time, DC's main rival, Marvel Comics, had found success in the genre with its Conan the Barbarian comics, and of all of DC's new fantasy characters, Claw most closely resembles Conan in both his character and appearance, except for the fact that Claw has a deformed hand.

Claw the Unconquered was published bimonthly up until #9 (October 1976), restarting again at #10 (May 1978). The entire series was written by Michelinie (though the never properly published #14 was credited to Tom DeFalco) and Chan remained on the title up to #7, with Keith Giffen taking over pencilling duties with #8. With the addition of Giffen, the series began to incorporate some science fiction elements, moving away from its pure sword and sorcery beginnings. The relaunch of the series lasted just three issues, as it was suddenly cancelled with #12 (September 1978) as part of the "DC Implosion" when DC's comics line was drastically cut. The cancellation was so sudden that two further issues of the series had been fully written and drawn. These stories were published in Cancelled Comic Cavalcade #1 in 1978, although only 35 copies of that comic were ever officially published.

The character was revived in 1981 for a two-part back up feature in Warlord #48-49 (August–September 1981) written by Jack C. Harris with art from Tom Yeates. This series tried to wrap up the story of Claw.

== Fictional character biography ==
Claw originates from the prehistoric realm of Pytharia, and possesses a demonic, clawed right hand due to a deal his father made with demons. The sorcerer Occulas learns that a clawed man will eventually defeat him and kills Valcan's father in an attempt to save himself. Claw and Starfire are later revealed to be champions of the Sornaii.

Following his self-titled series, Claw appears in Wonder Woman, Time Masters: Vanishing Point, and Dark Nights: Death Metal.

== Powers and abilities ==
Claw the Unconquered is an expert swordsman. He also wields a magical claw on his right arm.

== Other versions ==
=== John Chan ===
Another version of Claw is a superhero character created by Steven Seagle and Ken Hooper. He first appeared in Primal Force #1 (October 1994). An Asian youth from Hong Kong, this Claw has no direct ties to the original Claw, although he bears an identical misshapen hand. Claw's real name was John Chan. Chan became the Claw after buying an ancient suit of armour and sword. The Claw of Pytharia, which had been dormant in one of the gauntlets, cut off his hand with the sword and grafted itself in place. The demonic spirit of the claw increased his fighting skills, but made it difficult for him to control his anger. John Chan was a member of Primal Force throughout that series's 15 issue run.

=== Swamp Thing ===
Alternate versions of Claw have had cameo appearances in titles such as Sandman #52 (1993), Swamp Thing #163 (1996) and Starman (vol. 2) #55 (1999).

=== Red Sonja ===
Red Sonja /Claw The Unconquered: Devil's Hands #4, variant cover by Jim Lee.

In 2006, with the popularity of sword and sorcery comics once again resurgent due to revivals of Conan by Dark Horse Comics and of Red Sonja by Dynamite Entertainment, DC began to publish new Claw material through their Wildstorm imprint. The character first returned in Red Sonja /Claw The Unconquered: Devil's Hands (March 2006), a crossover limited series featuring Red Sonja which is co-published by Dynamite Entertainment and written by John Layman and pencilled by Andy Smith. A new Wildstorm Claw the Unconquered regular monthly title by writer Chuck Dixon and penciller Andy Smith debuted in June 2006. As of December 2006, the Claw monthly series has apparently run its course, ending with this version of Claw enslaved by demons from hell or a parallel universe, and the whole world doomed to demonic possession. The series gives Claw's full name as Valcan Scaramax. Claw either wandered back to his own world of Pytharia, or into some other world entirely, as nothing in the Claw series from Dynamite bore any connection to Howard's Hyborian realms.

It is unclear if the new Wildstorm Claw stories feature the original 1970s version of the character or whether they adhere to a new continuity. Red Sonja's current iteration is supposed to be consistent with her 1970s Marvel Comics continuity, and the direct connection between Claw's revival and the crossover with Sonja seems to indicate that these new stories occur on Hyborian Age Earth (where Sonja's stories are clearly intended to occur). Strictly speaking, the crossover also means that this version of Claw co-exists with Conan (and indeed the Marvel Universe, as Sonja's original appearances did), though it is unlikely that those connections were ever intended or will ever be acknowledged.

With the Red Sonja book shifting several years to tell the story of a new Red Sonja, a descendant of the previous one sharing the soul of the departed character, a new Claw appears: Osin, a former ally of Sonja whose powers are derived from the demon Jullah.
