= Tex Blaisdell =

American cartoonist

- Tex Blaisdell (self-portrait)
- Born: Philip Eustice Blaisdell; March 30, 1920 Houston, Texas
- Died: March 14, 1999 (aged 78) New York City
- Areas: Cartoonist, Inker
- Notable works: Little Orphan Annie

Philip Eustice Blaisdell (March 30, 1920 – March 14, 1999), better known as Tex Blaisdell, was an American comic-strip artist and comic-book editor. He worked on 22 syndicated features, including Little Orphan Annie, which he drew for five years.

== Biography ==
Born in Houston, Texas, Blaisdell studied at New York's Art Students League.

=== Comic strips ===
After four years in the Air Force, Blaisdell worked for 13 years on strips by Al Capp, Stan Drake, Will Eisner, Irwin Hasen, John Cullen Murphy, Bud Sagendorf, Dick Wingert, and others. In the early 1960s, he helped Hal Foster on Prince Valiant, originally doing backgrounds, but eventually his contribution escalated to finishing everything but the faces while his assistant Lee Marrs inked the backgrounds.

After Harold Gray's death in 1968, Blaisdell stepped in as the artist on Little Orphan Annie, which he continued until 1973, with assists from Paul Kirchner. For Leonard Starr, he handled the backgrounds for Mary Perkins, On Stage. At this time, Blaisdell worked at a studio on the fourth floor at 144 West 57th Street, overlooking dance studios and the rear of Carnegie Hall, a studio space he shared with artists Tom Sawyer and Carl Anderson, letterer Ben Oda, and scriptwriter John Augustin.

=== Comic books ===
Blaisdell also inked numerous DC Comics, including Green Lantern, Adam Strange, Superman, The Flash, and Batman.

Blaisdell taught for years at the Joe Kubert School of Cartoon and Graphic Art.

=== Personal life ===
Blaisdell married Elaine French, and the couple lived in Flushing, New York, where he died in 1999. They had two children, Barbara F. and Bruce F. Blaisdell. Elaine Blaisdell died September 7, 2002, at the age of 81.

== Awards ==
Tex Blaisdell's Little Orphan Annie (September 8, 1969)

Blaisdell won the National Cartoonists Society Comic Book (story) Award in 1976.
