= David Vern Reed =

American novelist

- Born: David Levine; December 13, 1914
- Died: August 11, 1994 (aged 79)
- Area: Writer
- Pseudonyms: Alexander Blade, Craig Ellis, Peter Horn, Coram Nobis, David Vern, Clyde Woodruff
- Notable works: Batman; Detective Comics

David Vern Reed (born David Levine; 13 December 1914 – 11 August 1994) was an American writer, best known for his work on the Batman comic book during the 1950s in a run that included a revamp of the Batplane in Batman #61 and the introduction of Deadshot in Batman #59 (July 1950).

== Biography ==
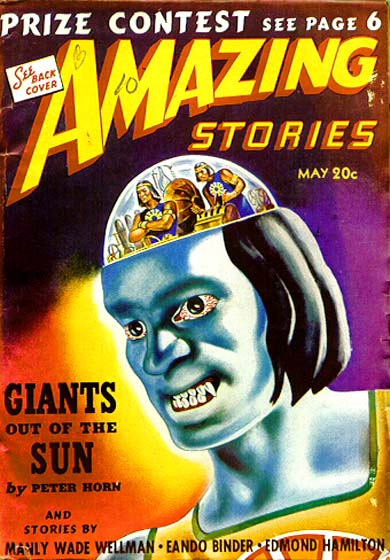
Reed's novelette "Giants Out of the Sun", published under his "Peter Horn" pseudonym, was the cover story for the May 1940 issue of Amazing Stories

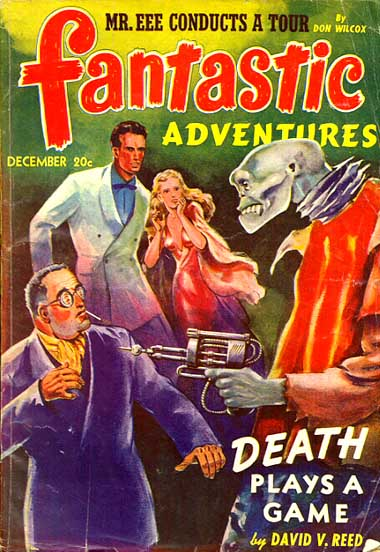
Reed's novella "Death Plays a Game" was the cover story for the December 1941 issue of Fantastic Adventures

Born David Levine in New York City in 1914, David Vern Reed grew up to become a writer, with his work appearing under several Anglicized pseudonyms, amongst them David Vern, Coram Nobis, Alexander Blade, Craig Ellis, Clyde Woodruff, and Peter Horn. In the 1940s, he wrote such science fiction stories as the novella "The Metal Monster Murders" in Mammoth Detective (vol. 3) #4 (Nov. 1944).

He was hired to write comic book scripts by his friend, Julius Schwartz, an editor at DC Comics. It was at DC where Levine — who like all Batman writers and artists of this time ghosted under Bob Kane's label — would eventually become best known to Batman fans as "David V. Reed". Reed's first story published by DC, "Ride, Bat-Hombre, Ride" in Batman #56 (Dec. 1949–Jan. 1950) was the start of his first tenure chronicling Batman's adventures. He and artist Lew Schwartz created the villain Deadshot in Batman #59 (July 1950). Reed wrote such key stories as "The Birth of Batplane II" in Batman #61 (Nov. 1950), "The Joker's Millions" and "Two-Face Strikes Again", the latter two featuring the return of the original villains introduced by Kane and writer Bill Finger. Another story from this period, "The Joker's Utility Belt", once mistakenly believed to have been written by Finger, was eventually adapted for Cesar Romero's first appearance as the Joker on the 1960s Batman television series, broadcast as the episodes "The Joker Is Wild" and "Batman Gets Riled". Besides Batman, Vern Reed wrote for Superman in Action Comics, World's Finest Comics and several of DC's non-superhero series.

He later left comics to return to prose fiction, writing such science fiction novels as Murder in Space (Green Dragon Books / Ideal Publishing, 1945), and stories for such magazines as Amazing Stories, Fantastic Adventures, and Astounding Science Fiction. He also wrote for glossy magazines including Argosy, Collier's, Cosmopolitan, Good Housekeeping, and Mademoiselle.

Reed returned to comic books in the 1970s and to Batman in 1975. Initially ignoring the character's large rogues gallery, he engaged the superhero in a series of bizarre mysteries such as "The Daily Death of Terry Tremayne" and "The Underworld Olympics '76!" Supervillains would later appear in tales such as "Where Were You On The Night Batman Was Killed?", a four-issue storyline drawn by artist John Calnan. Critic Chris Sims of ComicsAlliance praised that story in 2012, noting "The price of Batman's heroism, the guilt that he feels for being personally responsible for the victim showing up at the scene of one of his exploits, the lengths to which he's willing to go to make sure that this person isn't just another (literally) faceless victim, the desire to make sure he has the right killer — they're all very modern ideas. This story may not be as well-known as anything by Englehart and Rogers or O'Neil and Adams, but it's just as much of a turning point in how Batman was presented." Batman #300 (June 1978) featured a story by Reed and artist Walt Simonson

After writing various Batman stories for three years, Reed left comics again in 1978 with his final Batman story "Hang the Batman" appearing in DC Special Series #15 (1978). He died in New York in 1994 although some sources give a date of 1989.

== Comics bibliography ==
- Action Comics #169 (Superman) (1952)
- All-American Men of War #3–4, 6, 9–10, 13, 15, 18 (1953–1955)
- All-American Western #116–119 (1950–1951)
- The Amazing World of DC Comics #10 (1976)
- Batman #56, 59, 61, 67, 70–73, 75, 78–79, 81–85, 267, 269–285, 287–294, 296–304 (1949–1954, 1975–1978)
- Batman Family #20 (1978)
- Danger Trail #1–5 (1950–1951)
- DC Special Series #15 (Batman) (1978)
- Detective Comics #179–180, 185–186, 192, 197, 452–454, 465 (Batman) (1952–1953, 1975–1976)
- House of Mystery #236, 245, 251, 256, 258 (1975–1978)
- House of Secrets #134 (1975)
- Plop! #5, 10, 12–13, 17–18, 21 (1974–1976)
- Star Spangled Comics #92–95, 100, 103–105, 110–111, 115, 127–128, 130 (Robin) (1950–1952)
- Star Spangled War Stories #14, 23–24, 26–27, 38, 40–41 (1953–1956)
- Strange Adventures #1–2, 4 (1950–1951)
- Weird War Tales #31 (1974)
- World's Finest Comics #49–54, 56–61, 66 (Batman) (1950–1953)

Preceded by Bill Finger	Batman writer 1949–1954	Succeeded by Edmond Hamilton
Preceded by Bill Finger	Detective Comics writer 1952–1953	Succeeded by Edmond Hamilton
Preceded by Dennis O'Neil	Batman writer 1975–1978	Succeeded by Gerry Conway
Preceded by Dennis O'Neil	Detective Comics writer 1975	Succeeded by Elliot S. Maggin
