= The Joker's Millions =

Comic book storyline

- Cover of Detective Comics vol. 1, #180 (Feb. 1952), art by Win Mortimer
- Publisher: DC Comics
- Publication date: February 1952
- Genre: Superhero
- Main character(s): Batman, Robin, the Joker

Creative team
- Writer: David Vern
- Penciller: Dick Sprang
- Inker: Charles Paris
- Batman: The Complete History: ISBN 0-8118-4232-0

"The Joker's Millions" is a comic book storyline featuring the character Joker, published in Detective Comics #180 (February 1952). In the story, the Joker decides to retire from crime after inheriting a massive fortune, only to find out too late that he has fallen victim to an elaborate scheme to humiliate him.

== Publication history ==
"The Joker's Millions" was published in Detective Comics #180 (Feb. 1952). As with all early Batman comics at the time, Bob Kane is the only person credited for the comic, but the story itself was written by "David Vern" (a.k.a. David V. Reed).

== Plot ==
At the funeral of "King" Barlowe, a criminal racketeer and a major rival of the Joker, the Joker is surprised to learn that Barlowe's will leaves him millions of dollars. With his newfound fortune, the Joker decides to retire from crime and finally live the fine life he's always secretly desired for himself. He spends his new wealth quickly, believing that there's plenty left – only to discover that Barlow has had the last laugh; the "money" is all counterfeit. He then receives a visit from the IRS, which has assessed an inheritance tax based on the total amount of the supposed fortune.

The Joker is torn between reporting the inheritance as counterfeit in order to avoid the tax liability (thus becoming a laughing-stock in the Gotham City underworld for admitting that Barlowe had tricked him), going to jail for tax evasion (which would be equally humiliating), or returning to crime until he can pay the tax and protect his reputation. The Joker chooses the third option, yet he decides to commit normal, "un-Jokerish" crimes as secretly as possible and without his usual calling card flourishes, figuring that no one would ever suspect him of such pedestrian affairs. First, he breaks into a bank safe, but "fate's invisible hand plays strange tricks" as the wind blows a movie theater's banner onto the bank that the Joker just robbed, making it look like a Joker crime. After discovering that the Joker's money is counterfeit, Batman and Robin realize the opportunity: they can have Joker arrested and imprisoned instead of allowing him to plead insanity and thus get sent to Arkham Asylum.

When the Joker performs a stick-up at the Gotham Opera House dressed in a trench coat and slouch hat, Batman is able to guess that the Joker was behind it and burns the theater's tickets to I Pagliacci to make it, too, look like a Joker crime. A similar deduction occurs after the Joker tries robbing the Gotham Zoo. Batman pretends to have been subdued and locked in the zoo's bat cage by the Joker. Unable to resist a chance to satisfy his massive ego, the Clown Prince of Crime boasts to an underworld friend that he had robbed the zoo for the sole purpose of humiliating Batman. However, the underworld friend was actually Batman in disguise, and with a recording of the Joker's confession that Batman made, the Joker is promptly arrested.

== Collected editions ==
As well as appearing in Detective Comics #180, the story has been reprinted in a trade paperback:

- Batman: The Complete History (paperback, 1999, Chronicle Books ISBN 0-8118-4232-0)

== In other media ==
"The Joker's Millions" was adapted for an episode of The New Batman Adventures animated television series, which aired on February 21, 1998. The episode remains mostly faithful to the original story while updating or changing certain aspects, such as the use of series original character Harley Quinn and Batgirl taking Robin's place in the story as he had become Nightwing at that point in the series. Additionally, the Joker learns of Edward "King" Barlowe's deception via a video tape and attempts to have one of his men impersonate him to distract Batman from what happened. Barlowe's death was depicted differently: in the comic, he died in a failed escape attempt from prison, while in the episode, he died from natural causes. However, Batman exposes the imposter and the Joker is eventually captured and sent to Arkham Asylum, where Harley takes revenge on him for replacing her.
