= Charles Paris =

American comic book artist (1911–1994)

- Born: September 25, 1911 North Carolina
- Died: March 19, 1994 (aged 82) Arizona
- Area: Inker
- Notable works: Metamorpho

Charles S. Paris (September 25, 1911 – March 19, 1994) was an American comic book artist who predominantly worked as an inker, mainly for DC Comics.

== Early life ==
Paris was born in 1911, and moved to New York City in 1934. In Spring 1941, Paris met Jack Lehti, and soon after began work inking and lettering Lehti's Crimson Avenger in the pages of Detective Comics. From there, Paris started work in the DC 'bullpen', inking characters such as Airwave, and later working on Vigilante and Johnny Quick, among other characters.

== Batman ==
He worked with Bob Kane on the 1943-46 Batman and Robin newspaper strip, inking most of its run. When that strip ended, Paris was employed by DC Comics as an inker on a number of Batman comic stories and covers, predominantly inking the work of Sheldon Moldoff and Dick Sprang. Despite working on Moldoff's pencils for a number of years, the pair never met, Moldoff recalling "The field was very competitive, and you rarely hobnobbed with people, because there was always somebody waiting for your job." During Paris' run on the book the character Batmite was introduced. In addition to his inking work, Paris penciled two issues of the Batman title - #42 and #46.

Paris worked on Batman titles until 1964.

== Other work ==
Paris's last regular assignment from DC was inking the self-titled Metamorpho comic book, for which he inked 15 of the 17 issues between July 1965 and December 1967.

Outside of the comics field, during the late 1940s and early 1950s, "Paris produced a variety of artwork... including Western genre paintings."

He died in 1994 in Arizona.
