= The Last Son of Krypton =

The Last Son of Krypton may refer to:

- Superman, the last descendant of the Kryptonian race
- The Eradicator, a Kryptonian artifact which briefly believed itself to be Superman
- Superman: Last Son of Krypton, a 1978 origin story novel
- Superman: The Last Son of Krypton, a 1996 television film that served as the series premiere of Superman: The Animated Series (split into a three-parter episode for reruns)
