= 1984 United States House of Representatives elections in New Hampshire =

- November 6, 1984

Both New Hampshire seats to the United States House of Representatives
	Majority party	Minority party
Party	Republican	Democratic
Last election	2	0
Seats won	2	0
Seat change	Steady	Steady
Popular vote	150,602	119,111
Percentage	67.20%	31.94%

The 1984 United States House of Representatives elections in New Hampshire were held on November 6, 1984, to determine who would represent New Hampshire in the United States House of Representatives. New Hampshire had two seats in the House, apportioned according to the 1980 United States census. Representatives are elected for two-year terms.

== Overview ==
United States House of Representatives elections in New Hampshire, 1984
Party	Votes	Percentage	Seats	+/–
Republican	250,602	67.20%	2	—
Democratic	119,111	31.94%	0	—
Libertarian	1,749	0.47%	0	—
Independent	1,435	0.38%	0	—
Totals	372,897	100.0%	2	—

== District 1 ==
1984 Democratic U.S. House primary
Party	Candidate	Votes	%
Democratic	Dudley Dudley	14,086	49.92%
Democratic	James M. Demers	12,910	45.75%
Democratic	Steven J. Grycel	1,149	4.07%
Democratic	Others	37	0.13%
Democratic	Robert C. Smith (Note: Smith was the Republican Party nominee in the general election but appeared on the ballot in the Democratic primary as well.)	36	0.13%

1984 Republican U.S. House primary
Party	Candidate	Votes	%
Republican	Robert C. Smith	14,598	41.82%
Republican	Lawrence J. Brady	8,928	25.57%
Republican	Carleton Eldredge	5,577	15.98%
Republican	Lucielle C. LaGasse	1,395	4.00%
Republican	Dudley Dudley (Note: Dudley was the Democratic Party nominee in the general election but appeared on the ballot in the Republican primary as well.)	104	0.30%
Republican	James M. Demers (Note: Demers was a Democratic Party candidate in the primary election but appeared on the ballot in the Republican primary as well.)	63	0.18%

New Hampshire's 1st congressional district election, 1984
Party	Candidate	Votes	%
Republican	Robert C. Smith	111,627	58.60%
Democratic	Dudley Dudley	76,854	40.35%
Independent	John G. H. Muehlke, Jr.	1,435	0.75%
Libertarian	Arne R. Erickson	570	0.30%
Total votes		190,486	100.00%
Republican gain from Democratic			

== District 2 ==
1984 Democratic U.S. House primary
Party	Candidate	Votes	%
Democratic	Larry Converse	5,936	41.59%
Democratic	Elliot S. Maggin	4,710	33.00%
Democratic	Carmen C. Chimento	3,554	24.90%
Democratic	Judd Gregg (Note: Gregg was the Republican Party nominee in the general election but appeared on the ballot in the Democratic primary as well.)	74	0.52%
Total votes		14,274	100.00%

New Hampshire's 2nd congressional district election, 1984
Party	Candidate	Votes	%
Republican	Judd Gregg	138,975	76.19%
Democratic	Larry Converse	42,257	23.17%
Libertarian	Alan Groupe	1,179	0.65%
Total votes		182,411	100.00%
Republican hold			

== See also ==
- 1984 United States House of Representatives elections
