= Larry Converse =

American politician

Larry Converse (born 18 November 1942) is a Democratic politician from Claremont, New Hampshire. He was the 1984 Democratic nominee for the U.S. House of Representatives in New Hampshire's 2nd district, losing to the Republican incumbent Judd Gregg.

== Political career ==
=== 1984 U.S. House election ===
Converse stood to be the Democratic nominee for the 1984 House election in New Hampshire's 2nd district. He won the nomination with 5,936 votes to Elliot S. Maggin's 4,710 votes and Carmen C. Chimento's 3,554 votes. He later lost to Republican incumbent Judd Gregg, gaining only 23% of the vote. Converse gave up his factory job to campaign for Congress and was refused his old position after the election.

1984 Democratic U.S. House primary
| Party | Candidate | Votes | % |
|---|---|---|---|
| Democratic | Larry Converse | 5,936 | 41.59% |
| Democratic | Elliot S. Maggin | 4,710 | 33.00% |
| Democratic | Carmen C. Chimento | 3,554 | 24.90% |
| Democratic | Judd Gregg (Note: Gregg was the Republican Party nominee in the general election but appeared on the ballot in the Democratic primary as well.) | 74 | 0.52% |
| Total votes | | 14,274 | 100.00% |

New Hampshire's 2nd congressional district election, 1984
| Party | Candidate | Votes | % |
|---|---|---|---|
| Republican | Judd Gregg | 138,975 | 76.19% |
| Democratic | Larry Converse | 42,257 | 23.17% |
| Libertarian | Alan Groupe | 1,179 | 0.65% |
| Total votes | | 182,411 | 100.00% |
| Republican hold | | | |

=== State politics ===
Converse was elected to the New Hampshire House of Representatives in 2004 and re-elected in 2006. He failed to get re-elected in 2008 but regained his seat in the House in 2014. Converse lost the 2016 election and failed to gain the nomination in 2018. He was the Treasurer for the Sullivan County Democrats and the Chair of the Claremont Democratic Party.

== Personal life ==
Converse is married with two children.
