= Lew Sayre Schwartz =

- Born: July 24, 1926 New Bedford, Massachusetts, U.S.
- Died: June 18, 2011 (aged 84)
- Area: Penciller
- Notable works: Batman; Detective Comics
- Awards: Inkpot Award, Emmy

Lewis Sayre Schwartz (/ʃwɔːrts/ SHWORTS; July 24, 1926 – June 18, 2011) was an American comic book artist, advertising creator and filmmaker, credited as a ghost artist for Bob Kane on DC Comics Batman from 1946-47 through 1953, and with writer David Vern Reed, as co-creator of the villain Deadshot. Alongside Pablo Ferro and Fred Mogubgub, he was cofounder of Ferro, Mogubgub and Schwartz in 1961, a film company whose work includes the credits to Stanley Kubrick's Dr. Strangelove. Schwartz was a teacher at the School of Visual Arts during the early 1960s. He produced a film about Milton Caniff in 1981.

He was the recipient of an Inkpot Award in 2002, and four Emmy Awards. Animator Jed Schwartz of Jed Schwartz Productions is his son and type designer Christian Schwartz is his grandson.

== Early life and education ==
Born in New Bedford, Massachusetts. Schwartz was of Jewish background. He was educated at the Swain School of Design. Already a fan of Chic Young, artist on the Blondie comic strip, it was here he became introduced to the art of Caniff, Noel Sickles and David Stone Martin through a school friend. After study at Swain, Schwartz went to the Art Students League of New York and became friendly with Caniff, occasionally spending his lunch breaks at Caniff's studio, watching him at work. Schwartz described Caniff as a father figure:

Well, my father died when I was 12, and Milton became a father figure, in a certain way. He had all the accoutrements... The more I read about him, he was what I wanted to become. The fact he hand-fed me, in answering my mail and being very nice, and that I could call, and he would talk to me on the phone, was exciting.

== War years and early work ==
In 1944, Schwartz enlisted in the Navy, and he was trained at Jacksonville as a radar operator and gunner. After two years service, Schwartz left the Navy and worked for Rod Willard on Scorchy Smith. In 1946, as well as becoming a founding member of the National Cartoonists Society, Schwartz met Bob Kane on a beach in Miami. Kane hired him to work on a baseball strip called Dusty Diamond which Kane stated he was developing with Will Eisner. Although Eisner had no memory of this strip in later years, Eddie Campbell has identified it as being for publication in Tab— The Comic Weekly. The strip never saw print, as Tab was cancelled after one issue.

In 1947, Schwartz was hired as an artist for the Herald-Tribune comic strip based on The Saint. However, creative difficulties led to Schwartz leaving the strip to Mike Roy. After The Saint, Schwartz found a job at King Features Syndicate through Caniff, initially working on preparing Steve Canyon for publication in various sizes. He also ghosted on the Brick Bradford and Secret Agent X-9 newspaper strips.

== Batman ==
Schwartz also began ghosting for Bob Kane. Advised by his father, Kane had refused to enter into a class action against DC Comics with Superman creators Jerry Siegel and Joe Shuster for ownership of their respective characters. Instead, Kane signed a deal with DC which guaranteed him steady income producing a set number of Batman story pages a year for publication. Kane then hired other artists to produce this work for him. Schwartz stated that he likely produced 240 pages a year for Kane over a seven-year period. Schwartz notes that Kane was "afraid to give anybody else any credit... Bob was scared to death it would be taken away if he acknowledged people that were helping him or even drawing for the strip." For his own part, Schwartz kept quiet about the assignment due in part to its well-paid nature and in part to shame: "I didn't want to be associated with the books. At that particular time it was beneath my status... or my objectives. Let's put it that way."

During this period he is credited with writer David Vern Reed as co-creator of the villain Deadshot in Batman #59 (July 1950).

== After Batman ==
Schwartz left Batman in 1953, describing himself as unable and unwilling to draw Batman for Bob Kane again. He joined a National Cartoonists Society trip to Korea, during the Korean War, assigned to the Eighth Army stationed in Seoul. Here he entertained the troops doing "chalk talks", inevitably once again drawing Batman day after day. After Korea, Schwartz found employment in the advertising industry, first with the J. Walter Thompson Company, where he started as a storyboard artist but soon worked his way up through art director to a producer in the film department. In 1961, he left J. Walker Thompson and entered into partnership with the animators Ferro and Mogubgub, founding Ferro, Mogubgub and Schwartz, with Schwartz bringing his ad agency experience to the table. The company received six Clio Awards.

Ferro, Mogubgub and Schwartz produced the credits for Stanley Kubrick's Dr. Strangelove. It was through Schwartz that Kubrick acquired the stock footage of the explosion which ends the movie. Schwartz sourced and arranged for it to be delivered to London through a contact Caniff had in the USAF. Towards the end of the 1960s, Schwartz formed his own company, working as a filmmaker and producing sequences for Sesame Street and network specials. Schwartz's work garnered four Emmy Awards, including one in 1968 for Take It Off, broadcast on November 4, 1967, on WABC-TV. He wrote, directed and produced documentaries on Norman Rockwell, Norman Rockwell and The Saturday Evening Post, and a self-financed one on Caniff, describing them both as "labors of love".

By 1988, Schwartz was producing The Dinosaur Group, a weekly strip for The Standard Times. This lasted for five years. He was then hired by the City of New Bedford to produce a graphic novel version of Moby Dick, for which he performed layout duties from which Dick Giordano provided the art. Schwartz found this collaboration, in contrast to the one with Kane, to be a very joyful experience. Schwartz taught at the School of Visual Arts, where he created the school's film department.

== See also ==
- Vicki Vale, a character Schwartz co-created
