= Miracle Monday =

Book by Elliot S. Maggin

- Author: Elliot S. Maggin
- Language: English
- Genre: Superhero fiction
- Publisher: Warner Books
- Publication date: 1981
- Publication place: United States
- Media type: Print (paperback)
- Pages: 205 pp (first edition paperback)
- ISBN: 0446911968 (first edition paperback)
- Preceded by: Superman: Last Son of Krypton
- Followed by: Kingdom Come

Miracle Monday is a novel written by Elliot S. Maggin, starring the DC Comics superhero Superman. It was published in 1981. A revised edition was published in 2017. This is Elliot S. Maggin's second Superman novel, following Superman: Last Son of Krypton. As with Maggin's first novel, the original edition was published as a tie-in with the then-current Superman film series, with the first edition including a photograph of Christopher Reeve as the character; the novel is not, however, an adaptation of any of the films, nor does it take place in the same continuity as the movies.

Miracle Monday tells the story of Superman trying to stop an entity of pure evil from causing universal chaos. The story introduces the time traveler Kristin Wells. The character later appeared in the Superman comics, both as herself and as Superwoman. The novel introduces the holiday Miracle Monday, which occurs annually on the third Monday of May. The holiday would also make an appearance in the Superman comics and in the television series Superman & Lois (S2E15).

== Plot summary ==
In the story, Samael, the ruler of Hell, sends his greatest agent of evil, C. W. Saturn, to Earth, to destroy Superman morally. Saturn is able to enter our dimension thanks to Lex Luthor having used a form of magic to escape prison, leaving a 'hole' between worlds. At the same time, Kristin Wells, a history graduate student from the far future, uses time travel technology to arrive in the present, for the purpose of finding out the origin of the holiday known as Miracle Monday, which is known only to be somehow connected to Superman. She infiltrates Clark Kent's circle of friends by becoming Lois Lane's assistant. To her dismay, because she does not belong in the present, Saturn is able to possess her. Saturn then proceeds to cause worldwide havoc, taunting Superman that the only way for him to stop it would be by killing its host—thus making him break his vow against killing. Saturn even reveals Superman's secret identity to the world, to further drive him into desperation.

Ultimately, Superman refuses to kill Kristin, even if it means he would have to spend the rest of his life battling Saturn. At that moment, because of the rules that bind demons, Saturn is defeated, and forced to grant Superman a wish. He asks that everything that happened since Saturn's arrival be undone, and it is granted, with Saturn then being banished back to Hell. However, a lingering memory of the events remained within the souls of humanity, causing them to begin celebrating the day every year, on the third Monday of May, starting the Miracle Monday tradition. Kristin then returns to the future to reveal this fact to the public.

== Impact ==
Mark Waid has cited the ending of Miracle Monday as his favorite moment from a Superman story. Paul Kupperberg credited Maggin for writing the "definitive" comic book story about Man of Steel, and cited all three of his Superman novels as favorites.

The ten-page story "The Miracle Monday Dinner" subsequently appeared in Superman #400 (1984). Kristin Wells debuted in the comics as Superwoman in DC Comics Presents Annual #2 (1983) and appeared again in DC Comics Presents Annual #4 (1985). She made a cameo appearance in Whatever Happened to the Man of Tomorrow?, the final Superman story by Alan Moore and Curt Swan.

In 2018, Maggin did an audiobook reading of the novel on his podcast, "Elliot Makes Stuff Up". In 2022, the Miracle Monday holiday was referenced in an episode of Superman and Lois.
