= Superman: Last Son of Krypton =

Book by Elliot S. Maggin

- Author: Elliot S. Maggin
- Language: English
- Genre: Superhero fiction
- Publisher: Warner Books
- Publication date: 1978
- Publication place: United States
- Media type: Print (paperback), ebook (html)
- Pages: 238 pp (first edition paperback)
- ISBN: 0-446-82319-8 (first edition paperback)
- OCLC: 4562020
- Followed by: Miracle Monday

Superman: Last Son of Krypton is a novel written by Elliot S. Maggin and based on the DC Comics character Superman. It was published in 1978. The novel was published as a tie-in to the release of Superman: The Movie, with an image of Christopher Reeve on the cover and (in its original edition) a section of photographs from the film. The novel is not, however, a novelization of the film, but rather a sequel, diverging from the film's story.

== Plot summary ==
Last Son of Krypton is Elliot S. Maggin's first Superman novel. It tells the "life story" of Superman; from his birth on the planet Krypton, to his childhood in Smallville and his career as Superboy, to his arrival in Metropolis and his career as Superman. The main antagonist in this story is a mysterious alien ruler with ties to Superman's past. Superman and his greatest enemy, Lex Luthor, must join forces to retrieve a document written by Albert Einstein and stop the alien ruler.

== History ==
From a 1996 amazon.com interview of the author, Elliot S. Maggin (original removed from Amazon.com):

Last Son of Krypton started out as a treatment for a movie -- the Superman movie that I was trying to convince DC Comics needed to be made as far back as 1974. When Mario Puzo showed up at the office one day to tell me he'd gotten an assignment to write a Superman movie and would I spend a couple of days with him telling him who the character was, I was thrilled and disappointed. I spent two days with Puzo, telling stories and smoking enormous cigars, and had a fine time. Then I took my ignored little film treatment upstairs to Warner Books where a senior editor said go ahead and write a novel out of it. I did, and through a series of unlikely events, the novel was published the same day as the movie was released, and became a bestseller.

The book was released when I lived in New Hampshire, the day Superman: The Movie was released. I got a frantic phone call that week from the guy who was president of DC Comics saying that Alexander Salkind -- the producer of the movie -- wanted to sue me. Apparently someone had finally read him the book or something, and he thought there were too many incidents in common with the movie. I said that I had not seen the movie or read the script, but that I had handed in my manuscript a full year before Mario Puzo handed in his script, and owing to my conversations with Puzo. I told this guy where to look for proof of that, and said maybe I should sue Salkind.

Maggin said in 1997 that he knew that "nobody at DC with any clout" read the book, because no one prevented him from using the Xerox trademark when discussing an extraterrestrial criminal enterprise that smuggles the company's photocopiers (the best in the galaxy) from Earth. Maggin said that "the Xerox Corporation's response, by the way, was to buy fifty-thousand copies of Last Son for their employee book club".

== Audiobook ==
In 2018, Maggin did an audiobook reading of the novel on his podcast, "Elliot Makes Stuff Up".
