= Elliot S. Maggin =

American writer of comic books, film, television and novels

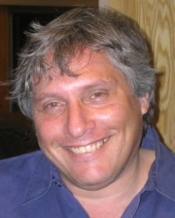
- Born: November 14, 1950 (age 75)
- Education: Brandeis University; Columbia University
- Employer(s): DC Comics; Atari; New Hampshire public schools Kaiser Permanente
- Known for: Action Comics; Superman
- Political party: Democratic
- Spouses: Pamela King (m. 1983; div. 1988) (m. 1991; div. 2011)
- Children: 2
- Website: elliot.maggin.com

Elliot S. Maggin, also spelled Elliot S! Maggin (born 1950), is an American writer of comic books, film, television, and novels. He was a main writer for DC Comics during the Bronze and early Modern ages of comics in the 1970s and 1980s. He is particularly associated with the character of Superman.

He has been active with the Democratic Party of the United States, twice running for the nomination of his party for the U.S. House of Representatives—once from New Hampshire's 2nd congressional district in 1984 and from California's 24th congressional district in 2008.

== Career ==
=== DC Comics ===
Maggin started working as a professional writer in his teens, selling historical stories about the Boer War to a boys' magazine. He attended Brandeis University, where he wrote a comic book script titled "What Can One Man Do?" as a term paper for a class during his junior year. When it received a grade of B+, Maggin disagreed with the assessment and sent the script to DC Comics. It was passed around the DC offices, and Neal Adams chose to draw the script. The story was published in Green Lantern #87 (Dec. 1971-Jan. 1972). Green Lantern editor Julius Schwartz commented that "I’ve been a comix editor for over 27 years and never... have I ever come across a ‘first-time’ script... that can come within a light-year of equaling ‘What Can One Man Do?’ in professional slickness and comix know-how. ... Indeed, to equalize this thrilling experience, I must go back three decades when, as a literary agent, I sold the very first story of a young Ray Bradbury!" Though the initial grade was not amended, Maggin became a writer for DC.

During Maggin's time at Brandeis, he befriended the university's vice-president, meeting his family. During one of the meetings, the vice-president's stepson (and future comic book writer) Jeph Loeb suggested a story that would eventually be called "Must There Be a Superman?". Maggin used the idea, which became his initial foray into the Superman franchise, and it was published in Superman #247 (Jan. 1972). He wrote Green Arrow stories as well, where his sense of humor was allowed far more freedom in the loose dialogue of the main character.

Superman #300 (June 1976) featured an out-of-continuity story by Maggin and Cary Bates which imagined the infant Superman landing on Earth in 1976 and becoming a superhero in 2001. The tale was an inspiration for Mark Millar's Superman: Red Son limited series published in 2003. He was the initial writer of the Batman Family title and paired Batgirl and Robin together as a team in the first issue (Sept.-Oct. 1975) Maggin wrote the first two issues of a licensed Welcome Back, Kotter comic book series which was based on the ABC sitcom. His credits for Marvel Comics include an adaptation of The Iliad in Marvel Classics Comics #26 (1977), and two superhero tales, The Spectacular Spider-Man #16 (March 1978) and The Incredible Hulk #230 (Dec. 1978). The first DC Graphic Novel featured an adaptation of the Star Raiders video game by Maggin and artist José Luis García-López.

Maggin wrote Superman #400 (Oct. 1984) which featured work by several popular comics artists including the only major DC work by Jim Steranko as well as an introduction by noted science-fiction author Ray Bradbury. Maggin's contributions to the DC Multiverse include Superboy-Prime and Lexcorp. His last Superman story, "...And We Are the Dreamers of the Dreams!", appeared in Superman #420 (June 1986), and he was one of the contributors to the DC Challenge limited series in that same year.

Maggin served as an editor for DC from 1989 to 1991 and oversaw the licensed TSR titles Advanced Dungeons and Dragons, Avatar, Dragonlance, Forgotten Realms, Gammarauders, and Spelljammer. He edited the Challengers of the Unknown limited series which was written by Jeph Loeb and drawn by Tim Sale.

==== Origin of professional name ====
Because comic book scripts tend to favor the exclamation mark as the punctuation of choice, Maggin routinely used it instead of a period. Out of habit, he once signed his own name "Elliot S! Maggin" and editor Julius Schwartz liked the distinctive rhythm of the name, insisting that Maggin's name henceforth be written that way. Explaining in an interview:

I got into the habit of putting exclamation marks at the end of sentences instead of periods because reproduction on pulp paper was so lousy. So once, by accident, when I signed a script I put the exclamation point after my 'S' because I was just used to going to that end of the typewriter at the time. And Julie saw it, and before he told me, he goes into the production room and issues a general order that any mention of Elliot Maggin's name will be punctuated with an exclamation mark rather than a period from now on until eternity.

=== Beyond comic books ===
In addition to the hundreds of stories Maggin wrote for the DC comics universe, he has written television scripts, stories for film, animation and journalistic pieces. Many of them have continued to show his allegiance to comic book characters. He wrote two Superman novels, Last Son of Krypton and Miracle Monday. He wrote the novelization of the graphic novel Kingdom Come based on the story by Mark Waid, and a novel featuring the Marvel mutant superhero team Generation X. He has occasionally sold scripts to non-print versions of superheroes, including Spider-Man (1994), X-Men (1992), and Batman: The Animated Series.

Besides his work in comics, he has received compensation for raising horses, skiing instruction, teaching at various high schools and colleges, writing stories for Atari video games, and working on websites. As of 2008, he had worked for several years as a developmental learning consultant for Kaiser Permanente.

=== Politics ===
In 1984, Maggin first ran for political office as a candidate for the U.S. House of Representatives in New Hampshire's 2nd congressional district but was defeated in the Democratic primary. After the election, the campaign was the subject of a lawsuit brought by the Federal Election Commission, in which his campaign treasurer and the committee itself had to pay fines for failing to submit a 1984 quarterly report.

Maggin was the Democratic nominee for a seat in the New York State Assembly in 1990. He was defeated by the Republican incumbent.

On May 21, 2007, Maggin announced that he would be running for the 2008 Democratic party nomination for California's 24th congressional district seat. On February 1, 2008, Maggin posted on the main page of his website that he had decided not to run after all, effectively ending his 2008 campaign. In an essay written the following day, he cited principally financial reasons for his withdrawal. It appears that at no point during this campaign did he ever officially file with the Federal Election Commission.

Maggin's campaign received the endorsement of fellow comics writer Jenny Blake Isabella.

==== Electoral history ====
New Hampshire District 2 September 11, 1984 Democratic primary election result

Candidate	Votes	Percentage
Larry Converse	5,936	41.59%
Elliot S. Maggin	4,710	33.00%
Carmen C. Chimento	3,554	24.90%
Judd A. Gregg (Note: Gregg was the Republican Party nominee in the general election but appeared on the ballot in the Democratic primary as well.)	74	0.52%

New York State Assembly District 19 November 6, 1990 General election

Candidate (Party)	Votes	Percentage
Charles J. O'Shea (R)	18,645	60.65%
Elliot S. Maggin (D)	10,373	33.74%
Edward J. Brennan (Right to Life)	1,722	5.60%

=== E-publishing ===
Several of his works of fiction are available exclusively online, including the short story Luthor's Gift and the novella Starwinds Howl, both of which take place in his Superman continuity. He has presented a novel-in-progress, Lancer, on his personal website.

He also set up a podcast called "Elliot Makes Stuff Up", where he did audiobook readings of his Superman novels.

== Personal life ==
In 1983, Maggin married Pamela King. The two subsequently divorced in 1988, though they remarried three years later in 1991. They were divorced again in 2011. The couple has two children together, Sarah and Jeremy.

== Comic book appearances ==
Maggin is himself a character in the DC Universe. During the Bronze Age of Comic Books, Maggin was a known resident of Earth-Prime and a major character in Justice League of America issues #123-124. In the Modern Age of Comic Books, Maggin cameoed as Oliver Queen's campaign manager in 52. This appearance references a term paper which had been awarded a B− at Brandeis University and was Maggin's first sale to DC, which posited Green Arrow's mayoral campaign in Star City.

== Awards ==
Maggin received an Inkpot Award at San Diego Comic-Con in 2013. In 2016, he received the Bill Finger Award.

== Bibliography ==
=== Comic books ===
==== Continuity Comics ====
- Revengers Trade Issue #1 (1992)

==== DC Comics ====
- Action Comics #420–421, 424–431, 433–437, 440–441, 443–452, 455–460, 568, 571 (1973–1985)
- Action Comics Weekly #642 (1989)
- Batman #244–245, 248–250, 252, 254 (Robin backup stories) (1972–1974)
- Batman Family #1, 3–7 (1975–1976)
- Batman: The Blue, the Grey, and the Bat #1 (1993)
- Blackhawk Annual #1 (1989)
- DC Challenge #6 (1986)
- DC Comics Presents #87, Annual #2, 4 (1983–1985)
- DC Comics Presents: Mystery in Space #1 (Adam Strange) (2004)
- DC Graphic Novel #1 (Atari Force) (1983)
- Detective Comics #432, 436, 449–450, 455–456, 458 (1973–1976)
- Green Lantern #87, 100 (1971–1978)
- Green Lantern Corps Quarterly #5 (1993)
- Heroes Against Hunger #1 (1986)
- JLA 80-Page Giant #1 (1998)
- The Joker #4, 7–9 (1975–1976)
- Justice League International Quarterly #8–9 (1992)
- Justice League of America #117–119, 123–124 (1975)
- Kamandi, the Last Boy on Earth #49 (1977)
- Plastic Man #14 (1976)
- Secret Origins vol. 2 #38 (Speedy); #50 (Johnny Thunder) (1989–1990)
- Secrets of Haunted House #24 (1980)
- The Shadow Strikes #20 (1991)
- Shazam #2–6, 9–13, 16, 18–20 (1973–1975)
- Showcase '93 #8 (1993)
- Starfire #3–5 (1976–1977)
- Strange Sports Stories #3, 6 (1974)
- Superman #247, 251, 257, 260, 262–268, 270–271, 273–277, 279–280, 282–283, 285–287, 290, 292–293, 295–300, 302, 376, 390–392, 394–395, 400, 411, 414, 416–417, 419–420, Annual #9–10 (1972–1986)
- The Superman Family #165, 168, 171, 174, 177 (Supergirl) (1974–1976)
- Tarzan Family #66 (1976)
- Time Warp #5 (1980)
- Total Recall #1 (1990)
- The Unexpected #208 (1981)
- Unknown Soldier #219 (1978)
- Welcome Back, Kotter #1–2 (1976–1977)
- Wonder Woman #214, 216–217, 225 (1974–1976)
- World's Finest Comics #210, 213, 255 (1972–1979)

==== Marvel Comics ====
- Generation X '97 #1 (1997)
- The Incredible Hulk #230 (1978)
- Marvel Classics Comics #26 (The Iliad) (1977)
- The Spectacular Spider-Man #16 (1978)

=== Novels ===
- Superman: Last Son of Krypton December 1978, 238 pages, ISBN 978-0446823197
- Superman: Miracle Monday May 1981, 205 pages, ISBN 978-0446911962
- Generation X (with Scott Lobdell) June 1997, 288 pages, ISBN 978-1572972230
- Kingdom Come March 1998, 352 pages, ISBN 978-0446522342

== Television credits ==
- Batman: The Animated Series (1992)
- X-Men: The Animated Series (1993)
- Spider-Man: The Animated Series (1996)

== Notes ==
Preceded by Len Wein	Superman writer 1972–1976	Succeeded by Gerry Conway
Preceded by Cary Bates	Action Comics writer (generally backup stories); 1973–1976	Succeeded by Cary Bates
Preceded by Dennis O'Neil	Shazam! writer 1973–1976	Succeeded by Dennis O'Neil
Preceded by n/a	Batman Family writer 1975–1976	Succeeded by Bob Rozakis
