= Bob Kane =

American comic book artist (1915–1998)

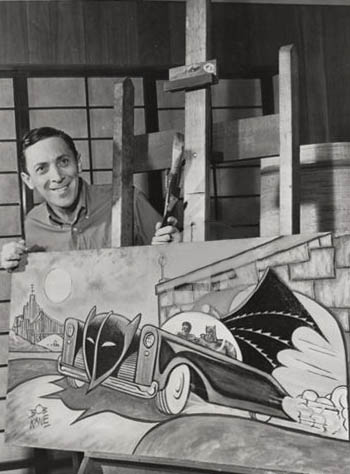
- Kane in 1966
- Born: Robert Kahn; October 24, 1915 New York City, U.S.
- Died: November 3, 1998 (aged 83) Los Angeles, California, U.S.
- Areas: Writer, Penciller
- Notable works: Detective Comics
- Spouses: Beverly Sommer (m. 1940; div. 1957) Elizabeth Sanders (m. 1987)
- Children: 1

Signature
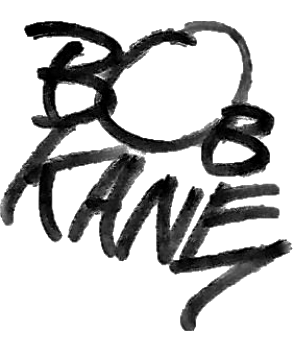

Robert Kane (né Kahn /kɑːn/; October 24, 1915 – November 3, 1998) was an American comic book writer, animator, and artist who was traditionally credited as the creator of Batman but is now credited as his co-creator (with Bill Finger). Kane likewise worked on many other early related characters for DC Comics. He was inducted into the comic book industry's Jack Kirby Hall of Fame in 1993 and into the Will Eisner Comic Book Hall of Fame in 1996.

== Early life ==
Robert Kahn was born in New York City. His parents, Augusta (née Tuchman) and Herman Kahn, an engraver, were of Ashkenazi Jewish descent. A high school friend of fellow cartoonist and future Spirit creator Will Eisner, Robert Kahn graduated from DeWitt Clinton High School and then legally changed his name to Robert Kane. He studied art at Cooper Union before joining the Max Fleischer Studio as a trainee animator in the year of 1934.

== Comics ==
He entered the comics field two years later, in 1936, freelancing original material to editor Jerry Iger's comic book Wow, What a Magazine!, including his first pencil and ink work on the serial Hiram Hick. The following year, Kane began to work at Iger's subsequent studio, Eisner & Iger, which was one of the first comic book "packagers" that produced comics on demand for publishers entering the new medium during its late-1930s and 1940s Golden Age. Among his work there was the talking animal feature "Peter Pupp"—which belied its look with overtones of "mystery and menace"—published in the U.K. comic magazine Wags and reprinted in Fiction House's Jumbo Comics. Kane also produced work through Eisner & Iger for two of the companies that would later merge to form DC Comics, including the humor features "Ginger Snap" in More Fun Comics, "Oscar the Gumshoe" for Detective Comics, and "Professor Doolittle" for Adventure Comics. For that last title he went on to do his first adventure strip, "Rusty and his Pals".

=== Batman ===
Detective Comics #27 (May 1939). The first appearance of Batman. Art by Bob Kane.

In early 1939, DC's success with the seminal superhero Superman in Action Comics prompted editors to scramble for more such heroes. In response, Bob Kane conceived "the Bat-Man." Kane said his influences for the character included actor Douglas Fairbanks's film portrayal of the swashbuckler Zorro; Leonardo da Vinci's diagram of the ornithopter, a flying machine with huge bat-like wings; and the 1930 film The Bat Whispers, based on Mary Rinehart's mystery novel The Circular Staircase (1908). Bill Finger joined Bob Kane's nascent studio in 1938. An aspiring writer and part-time shoe salesperson, he had met Kane at a party, and Kane later offered him a job ghost writing the strips Rusty and Clip Carson. He recalled that Kane

...had an idea for a character called 'Batman', and he'd like me to see the drawings. I went over to Kane's, and he had drawn a character who looked very much like Superman with kind of ... reddish tights, I believe, with boots ... no gloves, no gauntlets ... with a small domino mask, swinging on a rope. He had two stiff wings that were sticking out, looking like bat wings. And under it was a big sign ... BATMAN.

Finger said he offered such suggestions as giving the character a cowl and scalloped cape instead of wings; adding gloves; leaving the mask's eyeholes blank to connote mystery; and removing the bright red sections of the original costume, suggesting instead a gray-and-black color scheme. Finger additionally said his suggestions were influenced by Lee Falk's The Phantom, a syndicated newspaper comic strip character with which Kane was familiar as well. Finger, who said he also devised the character's civilian name, Bruce Wayne, wrote the first Batman story, while Kane provided art. Kane, who had already submitted the proposal for Batman at DC and held a contract, was the only person given an official company credit for Batman's creation until 2015, when Bill Finger was officially named a co-creator. Comics historian Ron Goulart, in Comic Book Encyclopedia, refers to Batman as the "creation of artist Bob Kane and writer Bill Finger".

According to Kane, "Bill Finger was a contributing force on Batman right from the beginning. He wrote most of the great stories and was influential in setting the style and genre other writers would emulate ... I made Batman a superhero-vigilante when I first created him. Bill turned him into a scientific detective."

The character debuted in Detective Comics #27 (May 1939) and proved a breakout hit. Within a year, Kane hired art assistants Jerry Robinson (initially as an inker) and George Roussos (backgrounds artist and letterer). Though Robinson and Roussos worked out of Kane's art studio in The New York Times building, Kane himself did all his drawing at home. Shortly afterward, when DC wanted more Batman stories than Kane's studio could deliver, the company assigned Dick Sprang and other in-house pencilers as "ghost artists", drawing uncredited under Kane's supervision. Future Justice League writer Gardner Fox wrote some early scripts, including the two-part story "The Monk" that introduced some of The Batman's first "Bat-" equipment.

In 1943, Kane left the Batman comic books to focus on penciling the daily Batman newspaper comic strip. DC Comics artists ghosting the comic-book stories now included Jack Burnley and Win Mortimer, with Robinson moving up as penciler and Fred Ray contributing some covers. After the strip finished in 1946, Kane returned to the comic books but, unknown to DC, had hired his own personal ghosts, including Lew Schwartz and Sheldon Moldoff from 1953 to 1967.

=== Robin ===
Bill Finger recalled that

Robin was an outgrowth of a conversation I had with Bob. As I said, Batman was a combination of [Douglas] Fairbanks and Sherlock Holmes. Holmes had his Watson. The thing that bothered me was that Batman didn't have anyone to talk to, and it got a little tiresome always having him thinking. I found that as I went along Batman needed a Watson to talk to. That's how Robin came to be. Bob called me over and said he was going to put a boy in the strip to identify with Batman. I thought it was a great idea.

Kane, who had previously created a sidekick for Peter Pupp, proposed adding a boy named Mercury who would have worn a "super-costume". Robinson suggested a normal human, along with the name "Robin", after Robin Hood books he had read during boyhood, and noting in a 2005 interview he had been inspired by one book's N. C. Wyeth illustrations.

The impetus came from Bill's wanting to extend the parameters of the story potential and of the drama. He saw that adding a sidekick would enhance the drama. Also, it enlarged the readership identification. The younger kids could then identify with Robin, which they couldn't with Batman, and the older ones with Batman. It extended the appeal on a lot of levels.

The new character, an orphaned circus performer named Dick Grayson, came to live with Bruce Wayne as his young ward in Detective Comics #38 (April 1940) and would inspire many similar sidekicks throughout the Golden Age of comic books.

=== The Joker ===
Batman's nemesis the Joker was introduced near that same time, in Batman #1 (Spring 1940). Credit for that character's creation is disputed. Kane's position is that

Bill Finger and I created the Joker. Bill was the writer. Jerry Robinson came to me with a playing card of the Joker. That's the way I sum it up. [The Joker] looks like Conrad Veidt—you know, the actor in The Man Who Laughs, [the 1928 movie based on the novel] by Victor Hugo. ... Bill Finger had a book with a photograph of Conrad Veidt and showed it to me and said, 'Here's the Joker'. Jerry Robinson had absolutely nothing to do with it. But he'll always say he created it till he dies. He brought in a playing card, which we used for a couple of issues for him [the Joker] to use as his playing card.

Robinson, whose original Joker playing card was on public display in the exhibition "Masters of American Comics" at the Jewish Museum in New York City, New York, from September 16, 2006, to January 28, 2007, and the William Breman Jewish Heritage Museum in Atlanta, Georgia from October 24, 2004, to August 28, 2005, has countered that:

Bill Finger knew of Conrad Veidt because Bill had been to a lot of the foreign films. Veidt ... had this clown makeup with the frozen smile on his face (classic). When Bill saw the first drawing of the Joker, he said, 'That reminds me of Conrad Veidt in The Man Who Laughs.' He said he would bring in some shots of that movie to show me. That's how that came about. I think in Bill's mind, he fleshed out the concept of the character.

Robinson added, however, "If you read the Batman historian [E. Nelson] Bridwell, he had one interview where he interviewed Bill Finger and he said no, the Joker was created by me—an acknowledgement. He can be credited and Bob himself, we all played a role in it. ... He wrote the script of that, so he really was co-creator, and Bob and I did the visuals, so Bob was also."

=== Other characters ===
According to comics historian Les Daniels, "nearly everyone seems to agree that Two-Face was Kane's brainchild exclusively". Catwoman, originally introduced by Kane with no costume as "the Cat", was partially inspired by his cousin, Ruth Steel. Kane, a frequent moviegoer, mentioned that Jean Harlow was a model for the design and added that "I always felt that women were feline". Kane created the Scarecrow and drew his first appearance, which was scripted by Finger. Kane also created the original incarnation of Clayface. According to Kane, he drew the Penguin after being inspired by the then advertising mascot of Kool cigarettes—a penguin with a top hat and cane. Finger, however, claimed that he created the villain as a caricature of the aristocratic type, because "stuffy English gentlemen" reminded him of emperor penguins.

== Later life and career ==
In 1966, Kane retired from DC Comics, choosing to focus on fine art. As Kane's comic-book work tapered off in the 1960s, he parlayed his Batman status into minor celebrity. He enjoyed a post-comics career in television animation, creating the characters Courageous Cat and Cool McCool, and as a painter showed his work in art galleries, although some of these paintings were produced by ghost artists. DC Comics named Kane in 1985 as one of the honorees in the company's 50th anniversary publication Fifty Who Made DC Great. He also engaged in the study of metaphysics. In 1989, Kane published the autobiography Batman and Me, with an updated edition Batman and Me: The Saga Continues, in 1996.

Kane worked as a consultant on the 1989 film Batman and its three sequels with directors Tim Burton and Joel Schumacher.

Stan Lee interviewed Kane in the documentary series The Comic Book Greats.

== Personal life ==
Kane married his first wife, Beverly, in the 1940s, and the two divorced in 1957. They had a daughter. Kane married his second wife, actress Elizabeth Sanders Kane, in 1987. She later appeared as the character Gossip Gertie in the 1995 film Batman Forever.

== Death ==
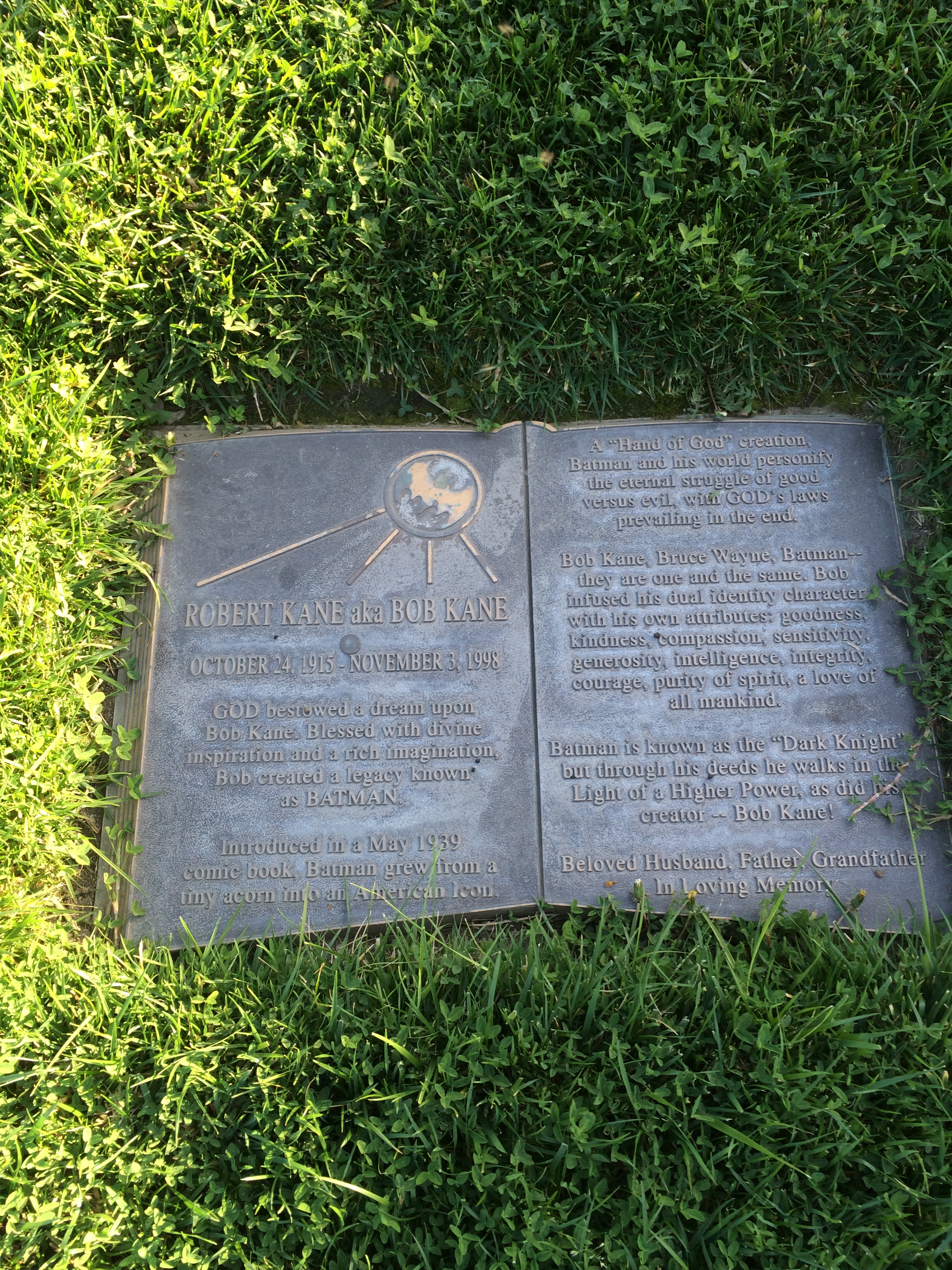
Grave of Bob Kane, at Forest Lawn Hollywood Hills

Kane died November 3, 1998, at Cedars-Sinai Medical Center in Los Angeles, at age 83. He is buried at Forest Lawn Memorial Park in the Hollywood Hills of Los Angeles, California.

== Awards and honors ==
Kane was a recipient of the Inkpot Award in 1977, was inducted into the Jack Kirby Hall of Fame in 1994 and the Will Eisner Comic Book Hall of Fame in 1996. He was added to the National Comics Awards' Roll of Honour in 1999.

On October 21, 2015, for his work in motion pictures, he posthumously received a star on the Hollywood Walk of Fame, at 6764 Hollywood Boulevard.

Kane's work is housed in collections in New York City's Museum of Modern Art, Whitney Museum of American Art, and St. John's University.
