= Kevin Nowlan =

American comics artist (born 1958)

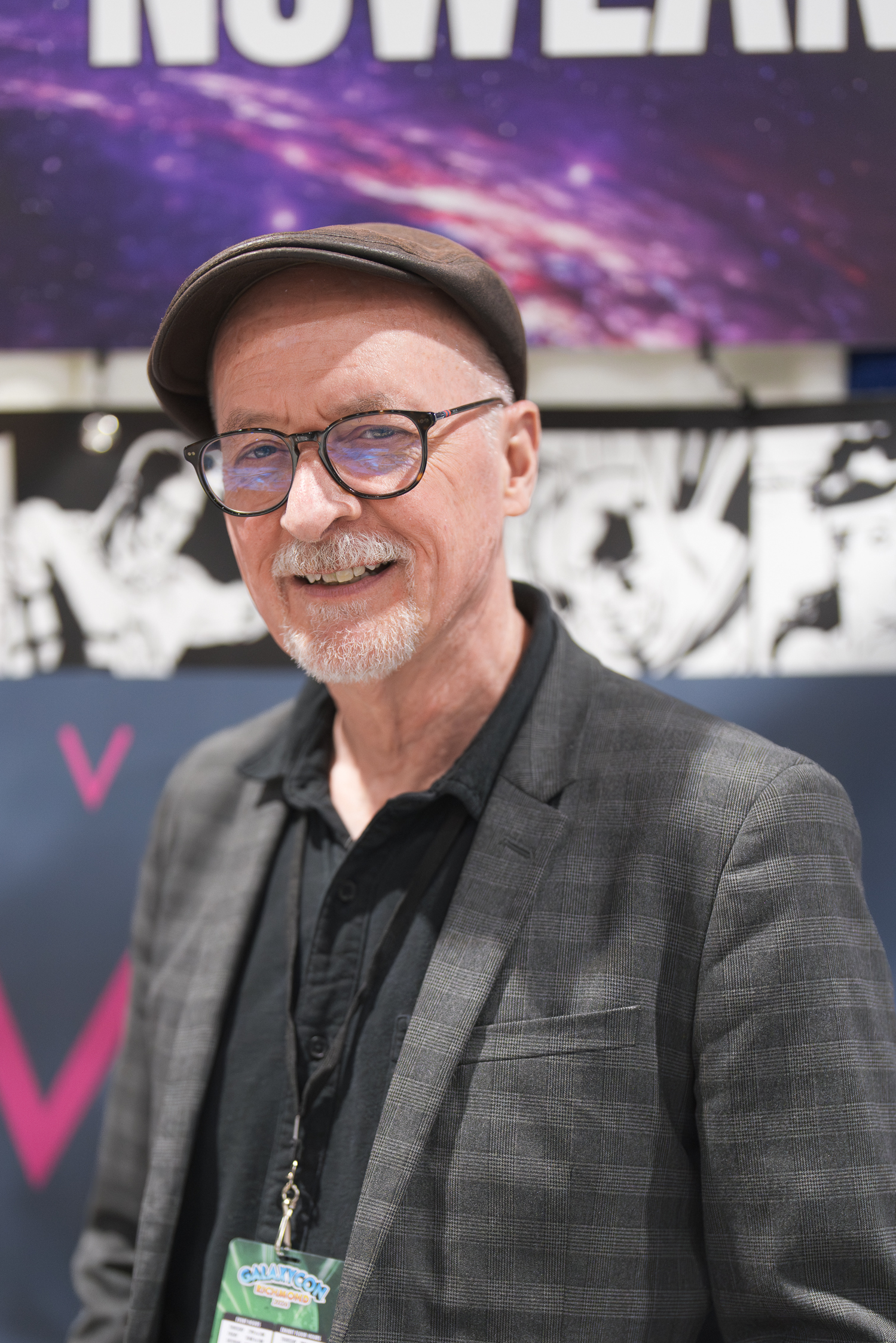
- Nowlan at GalaxyCon Richmond 2026
- Born: February 7, 1958 (age 68) Nebraska, U.S.
- Areas: Writer, Penciller, Inker
- Notable works: Tomorrow Stories
- Awards: Inkwell Award for Favorite Finisher/Embellisher (2008); Inkwell Award for The Joe Sinnott Hall of Fame Award (2011); Inkpot Award (2015)

Kevin Nowlan (born 1958) is an American comics artist who works as a penciler, inker, colorist, and letterer. He has been called "one of the few artists who can be called 'artists's artist'", a master of the various disciplines of comic production, from "design to draftsmanship to dramatics".

== Early life ==
Nowlan was born in 1958 in Nebraska. He has four older brothers and sisters. His brother read comic books, particularly DC Comics titles, and Nowlan has had comics around him since he can remember. As an illustrator, Nowlan is mostly self-taught, but did attend a trade school for approximately a year and a half to learn design and layout.

== Career ==
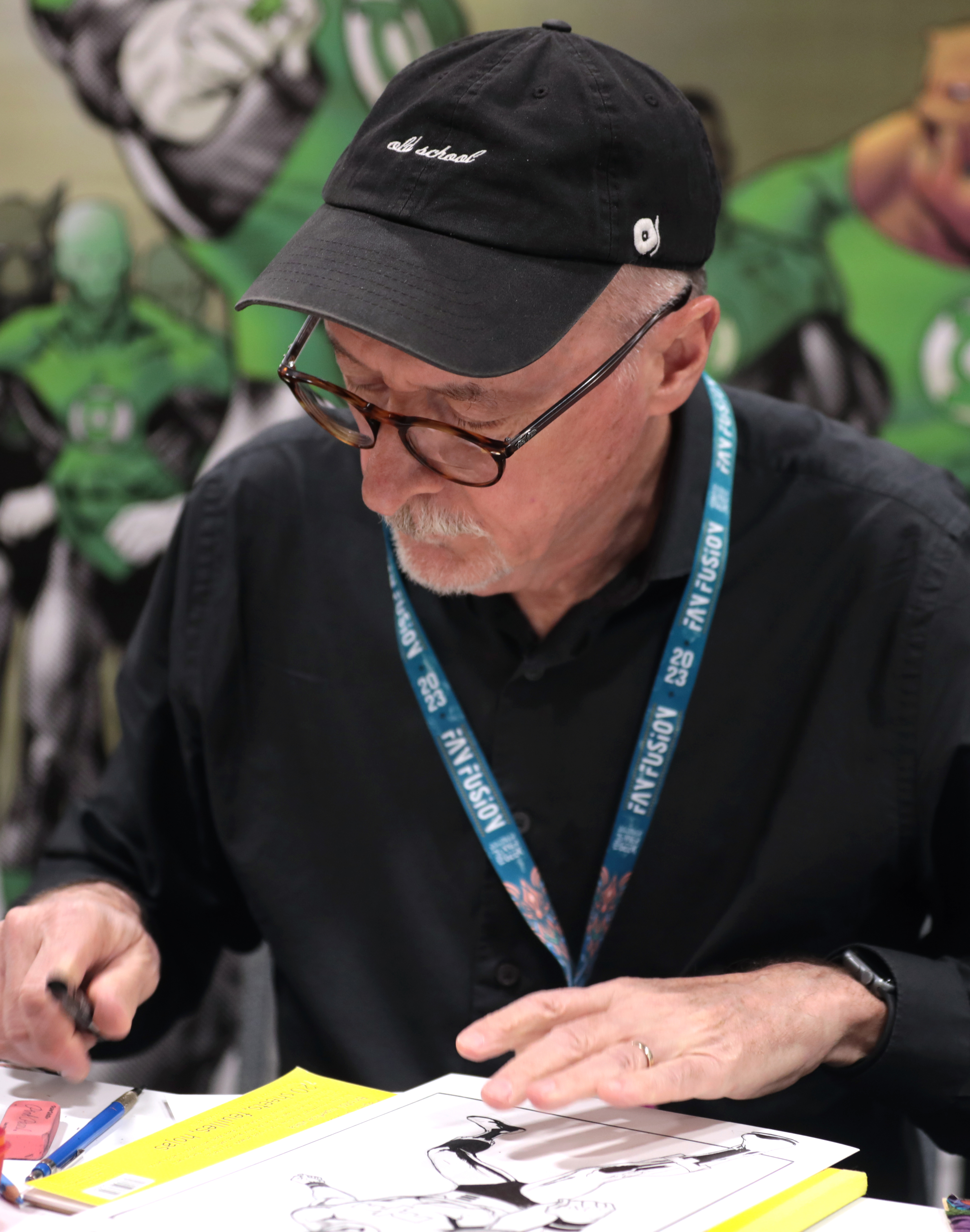
Nowlan at the 2023 Phoenix Fan Fusion.

Nowlan first came to the industry's attention in the early 1980s via illustrations in the fan press, most notably The Comics Journal and Amazing Heroes.

Nowlan's first published work for Marvel Comics was Doctor Strange #57 (Feb. 1983). He has worked for DC Comics and other comics publishers. He contributed to the adult Penthouse Comix. In 1992, he inked the Batman: Sword of Azrael miniseries which introduced the character Azrael. He drew the short story "The Castle" in Vertigo Jam #1 (Aug. 1993) which featured the Sandman and was part of "The Kindly Ones" story arc. One of Nowlan's prominent contribution to comics is the creation of Jack B. Quick with writer Alan Moore. This character appeared several times in Tomorrow Stories under the America's Best Comics imprint.

Although the majority of his work is as an inker, he has provided both pencils and lettering for various comics. He is a noted cover illustrator. Nowlan contributed character designs to Batman: The Animated Series, most notably The Penguin, the Mad Hatter, and Man-Bat.

Nowlan has described himself as a "finisher" rather than an inker, although only in specific reference to work "where you see too much of me", and has expressed an ambivalence towards this role, saying "it's not the right way to ink someone else's pencils".

His style gives a strong emphasis towards both facial expression and posture, and in neither case is he constrained by the conventions of the comic-book hero, and his protagonists are often depicted with awkward expressions or body postures.

Steve Gerber's posthumous Man-Thing story The Screenplay of the Living Dead Man, with art by Nowlan, originally planned as a 1980s graphic novel before being left uncompleted by the artist, was revived in the 2010s and appeared as a three-issue miniseries cover-titled The Infernal Man-Thing (Early Sept.-Oct. 2012). The story was a sequel to Gerber's “Song-Cry of the Living Dead Man” in Man-Thing #12 (Dec. 1974).

Nowlan inked the 1990s variant cover penciled by Dan Jurgens for Action Comics #1000 (June 2018) and inked the "Actionland!" chapter drawn by José Luis García-López in that same issue.

== Awards ==
- Inkwell Award for Favorite Finisher/Embellisher (2008)
- Inkwell Award for The Joe Sinnott Hall of Fame Award (2011)
- Inkpot Award (2015)

== Bibliography ==
=== Interior work ===
- Doctor Strange (Marvel):
  - "Gather My Disciples Before Me!" (with Roger Stern, inks by Terry Austin and colors by Bob Sharen, in vol. 2 #57, 1983)
  - "The Coming Slaughter" (with Jason Aaron, co-feature, in vol. 4 #1, 2015)
  - "Mistress Miraculous" (with Jason Aaron, among other artists, co-feature, in vol. 4 #6, 2016)
  - "The New Face of Magic" (with Jason Aaron and Leonardo Romero, in vol. 4 #11, 2016)
  - "The Weird, the Weirder, and the Weirdest" (with Jason Aaron and Chris Bachalo, in vol. 4 #20, 2017)
  - "Past and Present" (with John Barber, Juan Manuel Frigeri and colors by Dan Brown, in vol. 4 #25, 2017)
  - "The Lever" (with Mark Waid and colors by Jim Campbell, co-feature, in vol. 5 #10, 2019)
- Moon Knight (with colors by Christie Scheele, Marvel):
  - "Colloquy" (with Steven Grant, co-feature, in #29, 1983)
  - "A Box of Music for Savage Studs" (with Doug Moench and inks by Terry Austin, in #31, 1983)
  - "When the Music Stops..." (with Doug Moench and inks by Carl Potts, in #32, 1983)
  - "Exploding Myths" (with Doug Moench and inks by Carl Potts, Bill Sienkiewicz, Brent Anderson and Joe Chiodo, in #33, 1983)
  - "Second Wind" (with Jenny Blake Isabella, additional art by Bob McLeod and inks by Carl Potts and Joe Chiodo, in #35, 1984)
- Dalgoda #2–6: "Grimwood's Daughter" (with Jan Strnad and colors by Kenneth Smith, anthology, Fantagraphics Books, 1985)
- The Outsiders Annual #1: "The Skull... the Serpent... and the Outsiders" (with Mike W. Barr, DC Comics, 1986)
- The New Mutants #51: "Teacher's Choice" (with Chris Claremont and colors by Glynis Oliver, Marvel, 1987)
- Tales of the Green Lantern Corps Annual #3: "A Sense of Obligation" (with Richard Bruning, co-feature, DC Comics, 1987)
- Plastic Man vol. 3 #1–4 ("reality check" framing sequence; with Phil Foglio and Hilary Barta, DC Comics, 1988–1989)
- Secret Origins vol. 2 #39: "The Secret Origin of Man-Bat" (with Jan Strnad, anthology, DC Comics, 1989)
- A1 #4: "The Hero of the Tale" (with Jan Strnad, anthology, Atomeka, 1990)
- Vertigo Jam: "The Castle" (with Neil Gaiman and colors by Daniel Vozzo, anthology one-shot, Vertigo, 1993)
- The Big Book of Urban Legends: "Curses! Broiled Again!" (with Jan Harold Brunvand, anthology, Paradox Press, 1994)
- Penthouse Comix (anthology, Penthouse):
  - "Scion" (with George Caragonne and additional inks by John Nyberg (#3), in #1–4, 1994)
  - "Rod in Hell" (with Dave Johnson (as writer and main artist) and colors by Bad @ss, in #29, 1998)
- Batman Black and White #4: "Monsters in the Closet" (with Jan Strnad, anthology, DC Comics, 1996)
- Aliens: Havoc #1 (with Mark Schultz and colors by Pamela Rambo, among other artists, Dark Horse, 1997)
- Gen^{13} vol. 2 #36: "No Good Deed" (with John Arcudi and colors by Laura DePuy, co-feature, Wildstorm, 1998)
- Tomorrow Stories (anthology, America's Best Comics):
  - "Smalltown Stardom" (with Alan Moore and colors separations by Wildstorm FX, in #1, 1999)
  - "The Unbearableness of Being Light" (with Alan Moore and color separations by Ben Dimagmaliw, in #2, 1999)
  - "Pet Theory" (with Alan Moore and color separations by Alex Bleyaert, in #3, 1999)
  - "A Brief Geography of Time"" (with Alan Moore and colors by Wildstorm FX, in #4, 2000)
  - "Jack B. Quick's Amazing World of Science!" (with Alan Moore, in ABC Special one-shot, 2001)
  - "Why the Long Face?" (with Alan Moore, in #10, 2001)
  - "The Facts of Life!" (with Alan Moore, in #12, 2002)
  - "Jack B. Quick" (with Peter Hogan and colors by Michelle Madsen, in ABC: A to Z #1, co-feature, 2005)
  - "I, Robert" (with Alan Moore and colors by Michelle Madsen, in Tomorrow Stories Special #1, co-feature, 2006)
- Green Lantern/Superman: Legend of the Green Flame: "Chapter Four" (with Neil Gaiman, one-shot, DC Comics, 2000)
- 9-11 Volume 1: "Untitled" (with an anonymous writer, two pages in anthology graphic novel, Dark Horse, 2002)
- 52 #13, 20 (with Mark Waid, "Origins" co-features, DC Comics, 2006)
- The Goon: Noir #2: "Man of the Hour" (with John Arcudi, anthology, Dark Horse, 2006)
- X-Men: First Class Special: "The Museum of Oddities" (with Jeff Parker, co-feature, Marvel, 2007)
- Hellboy: Buster Oakley Gets His Wish (with Mike Mignola, one-shot, Dark Horse, 2011)
- The Infernal Man-Thing #1–3: "The Screenplay of the Living Dead Man" (with Steve Gerber, Marvel, 2012)
- The Graveyard Book (with P. Craig Russell and colors by Lovern Kindzierski, graphic novels, HarperCollins):
  - "1: How Nobody Came to the Graveyard" (in Volume 1, 2013)
  - "8: Leavings and Partings" (with additional inks by Galen Showman, in Volume 2, 2014)
- Lobster Johnson (with Mike Mignola and John Arcudi, one-shots, Dark Horse):
  - Satan Smells a Rat (2013)
  - A Chain Forged in Life (two pages of framing sequence, 2015)
- Abe Sapien #23: "The Ogopogo" (with Scott Allie, Dark Horse, 2015)
- Giant-Size X-Men Tribute (after Len Wein and Dave Cockrum, among other artists, one-shot, Marvel, 2020)
- Legion of Super-Heroes vol. 7 #9 (with Brian Michael Bendis, among other artists, DC Comics, 2020)

=== Covers only ===
- The Comics Journal #68, 75, 77, 98–99 (Fantagraphics, 1981–1985)
- Amazing Heroes #13, 17, 35, 56, 115, 167 (Fantagraphics, 1982–1989)
- The New Defenders #128, 133–134, 137, 149, 151 (Marvel, 1984–1986)
- The Incredible Hulk vol. 2 #292, 298, 362 (Marvel, 1984–1989)
- Solomon Kane #2 (Marvel, 1985)
- Doctor Strange vol. 2 #81 (Marvel, 1987)
- Teen Titans Spotlight #6 (DC Comics, 1987)
- Tales of the Legion of Super-Heroes #344 (DC Comics, 1987)
- Adventures of the Outsiders #42 (DC Comics, 1987)
- Alpha Flight #47–48, 52, 54, Annual #2 (Marvel, 1987)
- Centurions: Power Xtreme #1–2 (DC Comics, 1987)
- Strange Tales vol. 2 #4–8, 11, 14–18 (Marvel, 1987–1988)
- Secret Origins vol. 2 #17, 26, 44 (DC Comics, 1987–1989)
- Phantasy Against Hunger #1 (Tiger Comics, 1987)
- Omicron #2 (Pyramid Productions, 1987)
- The New Mutants #56 (Marvel, 1987)
- Batman #412, 703 (DC Comics, 1987; 2010)
- Solo Avengers #8 (Marvel, 1988)
- Doctor Zero #3 (Epic, 1988)
- Powerline #3 (Epic, 1988)
- St. George #3 (Epic, 1988)
- Nick Fury vs. S.H.I.E.L.D. #5 (Marvel, 1988)
- Doctor Strange, Sorcerer Supreme #1 (Marvel, 1988)
- Action Comics Weekly #639 (DC Comics, 1989)
- Marvel Comics Presents #16 (Marvel, 1989)
- Wolverine vol. 2 #11–16 (Marvel, 1989)
- Armor #11–12 (Continuity, 1991–1992)
- Magnus Robot Fighter vol. 2 #10 (Valiant, 1992)
- Showcase '94 #1 (DC Comics, 1994)
- The Man of Steel Gallery #1 (DC Comics, 1995)
- ID4: Independence Day #0–2 (Marvel, 1996)
- DV8 #1 (Wildstorm, 1996)
- X-Men: Lost Tales #1 (Marvel, 1997)
- Batman: Legends of the Dark Knight #101 (DC Comics, 1997)
- Legends of the DC Universe #10–11, 39 (DC Comics, 1998–2001)
- Superman: Save the Planet #1 (DC Comics, 1998)
- Superman 80-Page Giant #3 (DC Comics, 2000)
- Merv Pumpkinhead, Agent of D.R.E.A.M. gn (Vertigo, 2000)
- Deadpool #49 (Marvel, 2001)
- Hulk Smash #1–2 (Marvel Knights, 2001)
- Just a Pilgrim #3 (Black Bull, 2001)
- The Resistance #2 (Wildstorm, 2002)
- DC First (DC Comics):
  - Superman/Flash #1 (DC Comics, 2002)
  - Green Lantern/Green Lantern #1 (DC Comics, 2002)
  - Batgirl/Joker #1 (DC Comics, 2002)
  - Superman/Lobo #1 (DC Comics, 2002)
- Action Comics #795 (DC Comics, 2002)
- Adventures of Superman #608–609, 612–616, 619–623 (DC Comics, 2002–2004)
- The Legion #38 (DC Comics, 2004)
- Hawkman vol. 4 #32–33 (DC Comics, 2004)
- The Outsiders vol. 3 #26–27 (DC Comics, 2005)
- Shaolin Cowboy #6 (Burlyman, 2006)
- Red Sonja vol. 4 #19 (Dynamite, 2007)
- Metamorpho: Year One #1–6 (DC Comics, 2007–2008)
- Superman's Pal, Jimmy Olsen Special #1 (DC Comics, 2008)
- B.P.R.D. (Dark Horse):
  - The Black Goddess #1–5 (2009)
  - The Reign of the Black Flame #5 (119) (2014)
- The War That Time Forgot #7 (DC Comics, 2009)
- The Spirit vol. 6 #30 (DC Comics, 2009)
- Superman #702 (DC Comics, 2010)
- Flashpoint: The Outsider #1–3 (DC Comics, 2011)
- Before Watchmen: Nite Owl #1 (DC Comics, 2012)
- Back Issue! #65 (TwoMorrows, 2013)
- Dream Thief #3 (Dark Horse, 2013)
- Superman Unchained #4 (DC Comics, 2013)
- Necessary Evil: Super-Villains of DC Comics tpb (DC Comics, 2013)
- Forever Evil Aftermath: Batman vs. Bane #1 (DC Comics, 2014)
- All-New X-Men #19 (Marvel, 2014)
- Amazing X-Men vol. 2 #1 (Marvel, 2014)
- The Amazing Spider-Man vol. 3 #1 (Marvel, 2014)
- Miracleman vol. 2 #6 (Marvel, 2014)
- A+X #18 (Marvel, 2014)
- Action Comics vol. 2 #33 (DC Comics, 2014)
- Savage Wolverine #21–22 (Marvel, 2014)
- Comic Book Creator #4 (TwoMorrows, 2014)
- Sinestro: Futures End #1 (DC Comics, 2014)
- New Avengers vol. 2 #25 (Marvel, 2014)
- Batgirl vol. 4 #35, 50 (DC Comics, 2014–2016)
- Superman vol. 3 #38, 44 (DC Comics, 2014–2015)
- All-New Captain America #6 (Marvel, 2015)
- Secret Wars #2 (Marvel, 2015)
- Green Arrow vol. 5 #46 (with Spike Brandt) (DC Comics, 2016)
- Doctor Strange vol. 4 #4–5, 10, 13, 15–17, 19 (Marvel, 2016–2017)
- Star Wars: Obi-Wan & Anakin #1 (Marvel, 2016)
- Karnak #2 (Marvel, 2016)
- Legends of Tomorrow #3 (DC Comics, 2016)
- Hal Jordan and the Green Lantern Corps #1–25 (DC Comics, 2016–2017)
- Doctor Strange and the Sorcerers Supreme #1 (Marvel, 2016)
- Occupy Avengers #1 (Marvel, 2017)
- Star Wars vol. 4 #31 (Marvel, 2017)
- Batman/The Shadow #4 (DC Comics/Dynamite, 2018)
- Moon Knight #200 (with Frank Martin, Jr.) (Marvel, 2018)
- Doctor Strange vol. 5 #6–8 (Marvel, 2018–2019)
- The Unexpected vol. 2 #5 (DC Comics, 2018)
- Bitter Root #4 (Image, 2019)
- Black Widow vol. 8 #1 (Marvel, 2019)
- Green Arrow vol. 6 #48–50 (DC Comics, 2019)
- Star Wars: Doctor Aphra #29 (Marvel, 2019)
- The Goon vol. 4 #1 (Albatross Exploding Funny Books, 2019)
- War of the Realms: Journey into Mystery #5 (Marvel, 2019)
- Batman and the Outsiders vol. 3 #5, 8 (DC Comics, 2019–2020)
- Chrononauts: Futureshock #2 (Image, 2019)
- Tarot #3 (Marvel, 2020)
- Metal Men vol. 4 #10 (DC Comics, 2020)
- Justice League Dark vol. 2 #28 (DC Comics, 2020)
- The Batman's Grave #12 (DC Comics, 2021)
- Wolverine vol. 7 #7 (Marvel, 2021)

=== As an inker ===
- The New Defenders (covers only, Marvel):
  - on Mike Mignola (#139 and 141, 1985)
  - on Mark Badger (#140, 1985)
- Doctor Strange vol. 2 #69 (cover only, on Bret Blevins, Marvel, 1985)
- The Incredible Hulk vol. 2 #304 (cover only, on Mike Mignola, Marvel, 1985)
- The Official Marvel Index to the Fantastic Four #6 (cover only, on Sandy Plunkett, Marvel, 1986)
- Alpha Flight (covers only, Marvel):
  - on Dave Ross (#44, 1987)
  - on June Brigman (#45, 1987)
  - on Hilary Barta (#51, 1987)
- Kickers, Inc. (covers only, New Universe):
  - on Mark Texeira (#10, 1987)
  - on Mike Mignola (#12, 1987)
- The Avengers Annual #16: "Chapter Five" (on Jackson Guice, co-feature, Marvel, 1987)
- The Punisher vol. 2 #6 (on Mike Mignola (cover) and Dave Ross (interiors), Marvel, 1988)
- Strikeforce: Morituri #21 (cover only, on Mike Mignola, Marvel, 1988)
- Strange Tales vol. 2 #18: "Descent into Darkness" (on Dan Lawlis, co-feature, Marvel, 1988)
- Cloak and Dagger: Predator and Prey (cover only, on Larry Stroman, graphic novel, Marvel, 1988)
- The Transformers #47 (cover only, on Bob Budiansky, Marvel, 1988)
- Action Comics Weekly #642: "Chapter Four" (on Carmine Infantino, co-feature, DC Comics, 1989)
- Secret Origins Special (framing sequence only, on Mike Hoffman, DC Comics, 1989)
- Omni Men (cover only, on Jim Reddington, one-shot, Blackthorne, 1989)
- The Zero Patrol #5 (cover only, on Neal Adams, Continuity, 1989)
- Ms. Mystic #4 (cover only, on Neal Adams, Continuity, 1989)
- Marc Spector: Moon Knight #1 (cover only, on Sal Velluto, Marvel, 1989)
- Atomic Age #1–4 (covers only, on Mike Okamoto, Epic, 1990–1991)
- Uncanny X-Men #273 (cover only, on Jim Lee, Marvel, 1991)
- Wonder Woman vol. 2 (DC Comics):
  - on Cynthia Martin (#52, 1991)
  - on Joe Quesada (cover only, Annual #3, 1992)
- Armor #9 (cover only, on Neal Adams, Continuity, 1991)
- Harbinger (Valiant):
  - on David Lapham (#3–4, 1992)
  - on Howard Simpson (#16, 18–21 and 25, 1993–1994)
- X-Factor #79 (cover only, on Joe Quesada, Marvel, 1992)
- The Batman Gallery (cover only, on Joe Quesada, one-shot, DC Comics, 1992)
- Batman: Sword of Azrael #1–4 (on Joe Quesada (covers and interiors), DC Comics, 1992–1993)
- Sleepwalker Holiday Special (cover only, on Joe Quesada, Marvel, 1993)
- Solar, Man of the Atom #20 (cover only, on Joe Quesada, Valiant, 1993)
- Bloodshot #5 (cover only, on Don Perlin, Valiant, 1993)
- Megalith vol. 2 #3 (cover only, on Ernesto Infante, Continuity, 1993)
- Showcase '93 #7: "Image is Everything" (on Andrew Kudelka, anthology, DC Comics, 1993)
- SuperPatriot #2 (with Dave Gibbons and Karl Story — on Dave Johnson, Image, 1993)
- Batman (covers only, DC Comics):
  - on Joe Quesada (#500, die-cut variant, 1993)
  - on Mark Buckingham (#553–554, 1998)
- Aliens: Salvation (on Mike Mignola, one-shot, Dark Horse, 1993)
- Stormwatch Special #1: "The Music Lesson" (on Richard Johnson, co-feature, Wildstorm, 1994)
- Penthouse Comix #5: "Scion, Part Five" (on Russ Heath, anthology, Penthouse, 1995)
- Marvel Comics Presents #172 (cover only, on Keith Giffen, Marvel, 1995)
- Ripclaw Special (cover and page one, on Jordan Raskin, Top Cow, 1995)
- Hulk 2099 #2 (cover only, on Adam Kubert, Marvel, 1995)
- Superman vs. Aliens:
  - Dark Horse Insider vol. 2 #41 (cover only, on Dan Jurgens, Dark Horse, 1995)
  - Overstreet's Fan #1 (cover only, on Dan Jurgens, Gemstone Publishing, 1995)
  - Advance Comics Orderbook #77 (cover only, on Dan Jurgens, Capital City Distribution, 1995)
  - Superman vs. Aliens #1–3 (on Dan Jurgens (covers and interiors), Dark Horse/DC Comics, 1995)
  - Superman vs. Aliens II: God War #1–4 (on Jon Bogdanove (covers and interiors), Dark Horse/DC Comics, 2002)
- WildC.A.T.s: Covert Action Teams #25: "On Earth..." (with John Nyberg — on Dave Johnson, Wildstorm, 1995)
- Man-Bat vol. 2 #1–3 (covers only, on Flint Henry, DC Comics, 1996)
- Doctor StrangeFate: "The Decrees of Fate" (on José Luis García-López (cover and interiors), one-shot, Amalgam, 1996)
- Vampirella 25th Anniversary Special: "The Blood Red Game" (on Michael Bair, anthology one-shot, Harris, 1996)
- Green Lantern Gallery (cover only, on Mart Nodell, Gil Kane and Darryl Banks, one-shot, DC Comics, 1996)
- Detective Comics (DC Comics):
  - on Graham Nolan (covers only, #704 and 720, 1996 + 1998)
  - on Dan Jurgens:
    - Wraparound variant cover for #1000 (2019)
    - "Generations: Fractured" (co-feature in #1027, 2020)
- DC Universe Holiday Bash (anthology, DC Comics):
  - on Jim Aparo ("Just Another Night" in #1, 1997)
  - on Scott McDaniel (cover only, #2, 1998)
- Green Lantern vol. 3 #85 (cover only, on Darryl Banks, DC Comics, 1997)
- Anarky #1–4 (covers only, on Norm Breyfogle, DC Comics, 1997)
- Star Wars: Dark Force Rising #1–6 (on Terry Dodson, Dark Horse, 1997)
- Night Force vol. 2 #12 (cover only, on Gene Colan, DC Comics, 1997)
- Gen^{13} Bootleg #15–16: "Hangin'" (on Sean Shaw (cover and interiors), Wildstorm, 1998)
- Batman: Four of a Kind (cover only, on Dave Taylor, tpb, DC Comics, 1998)
- Green Lantern: Secret Files & Origins (on Gil Kane, DC Comics):
  - cover only (#1, 1998)
  - "The Star Sheriffs" (two-page story in #2, 1999)
- Legends of the DC Universe (anthology, DC Comics):
  - on Dave Taylor ("Fear of God" in #6, 1998)
  - on Terry Dodson ("Folie a Deux" in #10–11, 1998)
  - on Steve Ditko ("The Depths of Despair" in 80-Page Giant one-shot, 1998)
- Superman: Distant Fires (on Gil Kane (cover and interiors), graphic novel, Elseworlds, 1998)
- WildC.A.T.s/Aliens (on Gil Kane (cover) and Chris Sprouse (interiors), one-shot, Wildstorm/Dark Horse, 1998)
- Vertigo: Winter's Edge #2: "Style Terror Dress to Kill" (on Phil Jimenez, anthology, Vertigo, 1999)
- Superman, Inc. (cover only, on José Luis García-López, graphic novel, Elseworlds, 1999)
- Superman vol. 2 (on Dan Jurgens, DC Comics):
  - cover only (#150, 1999)
  - one page of interiors ("The Last Superman Story" in #200, 2004)
- Fanboy #2 (on Gil Kane, among other artists, DC Comics, 1999)
- Silver Age (covers only, one-shots, DC Comics):
  - on Gil Kane (Silver Age: Green Lantern, 2000)
  - on Ramona Fradon (Silver Age: Doom Patrol, 2000)
- Green Lantern: Circle of Fire (covers only, one-shots + two bookends, DC Comics):
  - on Rodolfo Damaggio (Green Lantern/Green Lantern and Green Lantern/Adam Strange, 2000)
  - on Darryl Banks (#2, 2000)
- Wildstorm Thunderbook: "WHAM! A Tale" (on Adam Hughes, anthology one-shot, Wildstorm, 2000)
- Batgirl Annual #1 (cover only, on Matt Haley, DC Comics, 2000)
- JLA #50: "Dream Team" (on Ty Templeton, among other artists, DC Comics, 2001)
- Deadman: Dead Again #1–5 (covers only, on José Luis García-López, DC Comics, 2001)
- Superman: Blood of My Ancestors (graphic novel, DC Comics, 2003):
  - on John Buscema (cover and the first half of interiors)
  - on Gil Kane (the second half of interiors)
- Tom Strong's Terrific Tales (anthology, America's Best Comics):
  - on Alan Weiss ("Young Tom Strong" in #8, 2003)
  - on Arthur Adams (additional inks for "Jonni Future" in #9–10, 2004)
- DC Comics Presents: Hawkman (cover only, on José Luis García-López, one-shot, DC Comics, 2004)
- Batman Villains: Secret Files #2: "If a Man Be Clay!" (on Mike Mignola, co-feature, DC Comics, 2005) (Note: Per Bob Schreck commentary in the "Contents" page, this story was originally intended for publication in Secret Origins vol. 2 but was not printed at that time as it had mysteriously vanished. After some pressure from Mike Mignola and a few phone calls, Schreck was able to track it down.)
- The Jack Kirby Collector #42 (cover only, on Jack Kirby, TwoMorrows, 2005)
- Action Comics #830–831 and 834 (covers only, on Dan Jurgens, DC Comics, 2005–2006)
- Justice League of America vol. 2 #0 (one page of interiors, on Dan Jurgens, DC Comics, 2006)
- JLA: Classified #32–36 (covers only, on Dan Jurgens, DC Comics, 2007)
- Bat Lash (cover only, on Nick Cardy, tpb, DC Comics, 2007)
- Witchblade (Top Cow):
  - on Stephen Sadowski (#110, 2007)
  - on Luke Ross (#111, 2007)
  - on Rick Leonardi (#112, 2007)
  - on Matt Haley (cover only, #120, 2008)
- Reign in Hell #1 (cover only, on Matthew Clark, DC Comics, 2008)
- B.P.R.D.: The Warning #1–5 (covers only, on Mike Mignola, Dark Horse, 2008)
- X-Men: First Class Giant-Size Special (on Jeff Parker (cover and framing sequence), Marvel, 2008)
- Batman Confidential #26–28 (on José Luis García-López (covers and interiors), DC Comics, 2009)
- Wednesday Comics #1–12: "Metal Men" (on José Luis García-López, anthology, DC Comics, 2009)
- House of Mystery Annual #1: "High Spirits" (on Mark Buckingham, co-feature, Vertigo, 2009)
- The Authority: Lost Year #12: "Reality" (on Jerry Ordway, Wildstorm, 2010)
- The Authority vol. 5 #27 (cover only, on Dave Gibbons, Wildstorm, 2010)
- Wildcats vol. 5 #28 (cover only, on Dave Gibbons, Wildstorm, 2010)
- Batman: Hidden Treasures: "Splash" (on Bernie Wrightson, one-shot, DC Comics, 2010)
- Batman: Odyssey vol. 2 #6: "Chapter Twelve" (with Josh Adams — on Neal Adams, DC Comics, 2012)
- Sensation Comics vol. 2 Chapter 40: "Our Little Dance, Part One" (on José Luis García-López, DC Digital, 2015)
- Spider-Man: Renew Your Vows #5 (covers only — two versions of a variant, on Joe Quesada, Marvel, 2015)
- Green Lantern vol. 6 #49 (cover only, on Neal Adams, DC Comics, 2016)
- Teen Titans vol. 5 #17 (cover only, on Neal Adams, DC Comics, 2016)
- Justice League: Darkseid War Special (cover only, on Neal Adams, one-shot, DC Comics, 2016)
- Marvel Legacy (cover only, on Joe Quesada, one-shot, Marvel, 2017)
- Dark Nights: Metal — Hawkman Found (on Bryan Hitch, one-shot, DC Comics, 2017)
- Action Comics #1000 (DC Comics, 2018):
  - on José Luis García-López ("Actionland!" short story)
  - on Dan Jurgens (1990s and Wraparound variant covers)
- Invaders vol. 3 #1 (cover only, on Joe Quesada, Marvel, 2019)
- War of the Realms #1 (cover only, on Joe Quesada, Marvel, 2019)
- Rumble (covers only, Image):
  - on Keith Pollard (in #11, 2019)
  - on Arvell Jones (in #12, 2019)
- Ghost-Spider #1 (cover only, on Joe Quesada, Marvel, 2019)
- Star Wars: Doctor Aphra #30 (cover only, on Adam Hughes, Marvel, 2019)
- Marvel Comics #1000: "The Devil's Brand" (on Joe Quesada, anthology, Marvel, 2019)
- The Batman's Grave #1–5 (on Bryan Hitch (covers and interiors), DC Comics, 2019–2020)

=== As a letterer ===
- The Incredible Hulk vol. 2 #301–305 and 308: "Gamma Grams" (logo design for the letters page, Marvel, 1984–1985)
- Moonshadow #1–7 and 9–12 (written by J. M. DeMatteis, drawn by Jon J Muth and Kent Williams, Epic, 1985–1987)
- ROM #75: "The End!" (written by Bill Mantlo, drawn by Steve Ditko, Marvel, 1986)
- Children of the Night Tide (logo design for the cover, tpb, Fantagraphics, 1986)
- Steelgrip Starkey #1: "Working Man's Myth!" (written and drawn by Alan Weiss, Epic, 1986)
- Flesh and Bones #1–4 (logo design for the covers, anthology, Fantagraphics, 1986)
- Anything Goes! #1–6 (logo design for the covers, anthology, Fantagraphics, 1986–1987)
- Vic and Blood: The Chronicles of a Boy and His Dog #1–2 (logo design for the covers, Mad Dog Graphics, 1987)
- Epic Graphic Novel: Mœbius 3 — The Airtight Garage (with John Workman, Gaspar Saladino and Phil Felix, Epic, 1987)
- Six from Sirius (adjustments to the original lettering of the six-issue mini-series, with Gaspar Saladino, tpb, Epic, 1988)
- The Punisher: Intruder and Kingdom Gone (subtitle logo designs for the covers, graphic novels, Marvel, 1989–1990)
- Hellboy #1-ongoing (basis for the title logo design, reworked by Mike Mignola, Dark Horse, 1993–...)
- Season of the Witch #0–4 (logo design for the covers, Image, 2005–2006)
