= Dennis Francis (artist) =

American comic book creator

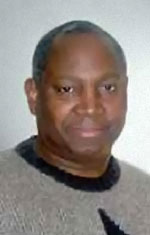
- Dennis Morales Francis
- Born: Dwight Dennis Morales Francis; February 1, 1957 (age 69) Kingston, Jamaica, West Indies
- Areas: Cartoonist, Writer, Penciller, Artist, Inker, Publisher, Letterer, Colourist
- Notable works: Jax and the Hellhound; Street Wolf

Dennis Morales Francis (born February 1, 1957, in Kingston, Jamaica) is an American comic book creator, artist, and writer. He created the Jax and the Hellhound and Major Lancer and the Starlight Squadron comic series that were published by Blackthorne Publishing. He also worked in advertising, film and television including Late Night with David Letterman.

Francis started as an apprentice to comics DC Comics legend Dick Giordano before working with his partner Neal Adams at Continuity Studios in New York City. He became one of the prolific writer illustrators during the heyday of black-and-white comics throughout the 1980s. His comics work usually centers on science fiction and fantasy.

== Biography ==
=== Early life ===
Francis was born in Kingston, Jamaica in February 1957. His family immigrated to the U.S. in 1965. He took a keen interest in comics during his adolescent years while enjoying the works of Russ Manning, Gene Colan, Neal Adams, and Dick Giordano. Francis made several attempts to break into the comics field during his high school years at the High School of Music & Art.

=== Career ===
At the end of 1975, Francis discovered advertising illustration and photography during his time at Pace University and soon gained employment in the newsroom of a local Brooklyn newspaper. He soon became adept at publication design, photography, and advertising design.

Francis had a chance encounter with the daughter of Neal Adams at a comic convention that led him to an impromptu interview with Adams himself. Francis was given an opportunity to meet with Dick Giordano of DC Comics, who had been Adams's business partner for some years at Continuity Studios.

In 1981, after a brief period of working with Giordano, an opportunity arose to work in the advertising art studio with Adams. Francis began working as a commercial illustrator with Continuity Studios, creating storyboards for commercials. Throughout that period, he also had opportunities to work on merchandising comics for the company, as well as animatics and concept art.

In 1984, Francis attended a Graphic Artists Guild seminar, where he was given an offer to work with the Late Night with David Letterman show on NBC. The job entailed the creation of comic book characters Frank and Fred along with cartoon and comic illustrations for the props. The project led to a two-year association with the show.

During the NBC years, Francis also worked with DC Comics as an illustrator of their merchandising. He was soon tapped to work with Joe Giella and Bob Lappan on a series of activity books in the children's market as well as the Superman Sunday comic strips. Francis was included in a project to design and implement a comic book for Nancy Reagan's "Just Say No" campaign.

In 1986, Francis had a chance meeting with Steve Shanes, the publisher of Blackthorne Publishing, and was tasked with designing characters for Blackthorne. During the height of the black-and-white comic book explosion, Francis collaborated with writer Mark Wayne Harris on the critically acclaimed limited series Street Wolf.

Francis designed and penciled the graphic novel X-L, along with the three-issue miniseries Locke. When asked what projects he wanted to personally produce and create for the new Blackthorne lineup, two projects that were in the works for many years were finally finished. Jax and the Hellhound, a proposed graphic novel, became a three-issue miniseries. The other project, Major Lancer and the Starlight Squadron, was a holdover from a proposed comic strip he created during high school.

Shanes then commissioned a series of children's activity projects starting with the "How To Draw" Series. The 3-D comics craze took hold of the consumers' attention in early 1988 and Blackthorne publishing jumped into the fray. Francis designed and illustrated several projects including the Transformers 3-D three-issue series.

From the end of 1988 to the middle of 1989, a series of unfortunate events brought his association to a close with Blackthorne Publishing as the comic book market burst. Francis came to work for the New York office of Continuity Studios, which had created a West Coast branch and needed a manager.

1994 saw the birth of T&D publishing; a publications consulting company that helps small business owners figure out how to use that newfangled invention that everybody was looking at called desktop publishing. With the proliferation of computers and digital printing, small business operations could have greater control of print communications.

By the year 2000, publication design became mostly digital design of the Web began to take more precedence in business communication. T&D Publishing became DiD Publishing as Francis began to work with online content and web design.

In 2008 he attended a comic convention in San Diego and was once again inspired to dust the cobwebs from his decade-old properties. He had registered the domain name graphic-novels.com years before, but now gave serious thought to returning to comics.

In April 2009, Francis began work on several comic book properties for his new venture: Graphic-novels.com. Jax and the Hellhound, The Hit List, Dangerlove and the Starlight Squadron were produced for online release.

== Bibliography ==
Comics work includes:

- The Hit List, Web series
- Jax and the Hellhound, Web series
- Locke, Blackthorne Publishing Inc.
- Jax and the Hellhound Blackthorne Publishing Inc.
- Official To Draw Transformers Blackthorne Publishing Inc.
- Official How To Draw Robotech Blackthorne Publishing Inc.
- Official How To Draw G.I. Joe, Blackthorne Publishing Inc.
- G.I. Joe in 3D, Blackthorne Publishing Inc.
- Transformers in 3D, Blackthorne Publishing Inc.
- StreetWolf , Blackthorne Publishing Inc.
- X-L , Blackthorne Publishing Inc.
- Starlight Squadron , Blackthorne Publishing Inc.
- Superman Sunday Pages, (fill in) DC Comics
- DC Comics merchandising activity books, DC Comics
- Game Boy #2 - It's A Small World After All, Valiant Comics
- Real War Stories #2, Eclipse Comics
- The Adventures of Frank and Fred, Late Night with David Letterman
