= Urth 4 =

- Cover to issue #1, art by Neal Adams

Publication information
- Publisher: Continuity Comics
- Format: Standard
- Publication date: May 1989 - December 1990; 1993–1994
- No. of issues: 4 (in Urth 4), 7 (in Earth 4)
- Main character: Urth 4

Creative team
- Written by: Peter Stone
- Artist: Neal Adams (covers)
- Penciller(s): Trevor Von Eeden (Urth 4); Walter McDaniels, Aron Weisenfeld, Vicente Alcazar (Earth 4)
- Inker(s): Ian Akin & Brian Garvey (Urth 4); Richard Bennett, Andres Klasik, Jeff Fefferty, Horacio Ottolini, Nelson Luty (Earth 4)
- Colorist(s): Liz Berube (Urth 4); Cory Adams, Tom Roberts, Victoria Erskine, Fabio Schlachticus, Scott Rockwell (Earth 4)

Urth 4 is a comic book series created by Peter Stone, Neal Adams and Trevor Von Eeden and published by Continuity Comics. The series ran for four issues (May 1989 – December 1990), and was then revived as Earth 4 in 1993, running for a total of seven more issues.

== Series overview ==
The title featured the adventures of a team of elementals created when Ms. Mystic was injured and called upon the Earth to help her. In response, the Earth gives Dwight Good, Kelly Kane, Baron Cotter, and Dennis Swan the powers of the four elements. At first calling themselves the Elementalists, they later choose the name Urth 4. The members of Urth 4 are Fyre, Watr, Ayre, and Urth, who are charged by the Earth to protect the environment from those who would harm it. The stories in their four-issue series had Urth 4 facing off against strip mining companies, a garbage monster, and pollution from an automobile plant.

== Sources ==
- Continuity Comics at the Grand Comics DB
- Continuity Comics at the Comic Book DB (archived from the original)
