= Ron Wilson (artist) =

American comics artist

- Wilson at GalaxyCon Des Moines in 2026
- Born: New York City, U.S.
- Area: Penciller
- Notable works: Marvel Two-in-One; The Thing; Wolfpack

Ron Wilson is an American comics artist known for his work on comic books starring the Marvel Comics character The Thing, including the titles Marvel Two-in-One and The Thing. Wilson spent eleven years, from 1975 to 1986, chronicling The Thing's adventures through different comic titles. He co-created the Wolfpack characters with writer Larry Hama as well as D-Man (Dennis Dunphy) with writer Mike Carlin.

== Early life ==
Ron Wilson was born in Brooklyn, New York and grew up in the Canarsie neighborhood.

== Career ==
Cover of Marvel Two-in-One #72 (February 1981). Art by Ron Wilson and Chic Stone.

Wilson entered the comics industry in the early 1970s at Marvel Comics where he produced both cover illustrations and interior artwork. He was the regular artist on Marvel Two-in-One from 1975 to 1978 and again from 1980 to 1983; while additionally working on titles such as Black Goliath, Power Man, The Hulk! and Captain Britain.

In the 1980s, after the cancellation of Marvel Two-in-One, Wilson teamed with writer John Byrne on The Thing (1983–1986). In 1983 he plotted and drew "Super Boxers" (Marvel Graphic Novel #8). He drew the entire run of Marvel's Masters of the Universe (1986–1988) and the Wolfpack limited series (1988–1989). Wilson's work also appeared in The Avengers, Captain America, Deadly Hands of Kung Fu, and What If. He also worked as cover artist for Marvel, pencilling not only covers for comic issues he worked on, but also for titles such as Iron Man, Thor and Defenders.

In 1990, Wilson illustrated an issue of Urth 4 for Continuity Comics and then returned to Marvel to draw WCW World Championship Wrestling in 1992–1993. His work appeared regularly in Marvel Comics Presents in 1992–1994. Wilson contributed to DC Comics Milestone Media imprint providing character design work and pencilled issues of Icon and Blood Syndicate (1994) as well as the DC universe mini-series Arion the Immortal in 1992.

In 2008, he provided a cover for the second issue of the pro wrestling-themed mini-series Headlocked published by Visionary Comics. As of 2012, Wilson was preparing a new creator-owned project: Battle Rappers. In 2022, he penciled an eight-page story for DC Comics' Milestones in History oneshot.

His cover for Captain America #230 (inked by Bob Layton) was used as inspiration for one of the official movie posters for Captain America: Brave New World (2025). The film also features the character Dennis Dunphy, which Wilson co-created. He received a "Special Thanks" in the film's credits.

== Awards ==
Ron Wilson received an Inkpot Award in 2017.

== Bibliography ==
=== Continuity Comics ===
- Urth 4 #4 (1990)

=== DC Comics ===
- Arion the Immortal #1–6 (1992)
- Blood Syndicate #14 (1994)
- Icon #11 (1994)
- Milestones in History #1 (2022)
- Who's Who in the DC Universe Update 1993 #2 (Arion entry) (1993)
- Who's Who: The Definitive Directory of the DC Universe #17 (Persuader entry) (1986)

=== Marvel Comics ===
- Avengers Annual #18 (1989)
- Captain America #383, Annual #6 (1982, 1991)
- Chamber of Chills #7 (1973)
- Crazy Magazine #68 (1980)
- Deadly Hands of Kung Fu #27, 29 (1976)
- Fantastic Four #178–179, 181 (1977)
- Fantastic Four Roast #1 (1982)
- Giant-Size Chillers #2 (1975)
- Giant-Size Man-Thing #4 (1975)
- Giant-Size Master of Kung Fu #1 (1974)
- The Hulk! #10–15, 17–18, 20, 22 (1978–1980)
- Marvel Comics Presents #11, 21, 23, 27, 49, 52, 85, 87, 94, 97, 113–118, 128–130, 140–141, 147–148 (1989–1994)
- Marvel Fanfare #48 (Vision backup story) (1989)
- Marvel Graphic Novel #8 ("Super Boxers") (1984)
- Marvel Graphic Novel: Wolfpack (1987)
- Marvel Premiere #55 (Wonder Man) (1980)
- Marvel Super-Heroes vol. 2 #4–5, 9, 14 (1990–1993)
- Marvel Team-Up #47 (1976)
- Marvel Two-in-One #12–13, 16, 18, 21–23, 25–29, 31–34, 37–41, 67–69, 71–73, 77–87, 91–94, 96–98, 100, Annual #6–7 (1975–1983)
- Master of Kung Fu #21, 28 (1974–1975)
- Masters of the Universe #1–13 (1986–1988)
- My Love #20 (1972)
- Official Handbook of the Marvel Universe #1–2, 4–6, 10–11, 13 (1983–1984)
- Official Handbook of the Marvel Universe Deluxe Edition #1, 6, 13, 18 (1985–1987)
- Official Handbook of the Marvel Universe Update '89 #8 (1989)
- Power Man #21–23, 25, 37 (1974–1976)
- Questprobe #3 (1985)
- Savage Sword of Conan #95 (1983)
- Solo Avengers #18–20 (Hawkeye) (1989)
- The Spectacular Spider-Man Annual #11 (1991)
- Tales of the Zombie #8–9 (1974–1975)
- The Thing #1–33 (1983–1986)
- WCW World Championship Wrestling #1–7, 9–12 (1992–1993)
- Web of Spider-Man #82 (1991)
- What If...? #23, 27–30, 39, 45 (1980–1984)
- What If...? vol. 2 #1, 19, 28–29 (1989–1991)
- Wolfpack #1–12 (1988–1989)

==== Marvel UK ====
- Captain Britain #31–39 (1977)
- Spider-Man and Captain Britain #231–247 (weekly) (1977)

=== Thrilling Nostalgia ===
- The Liberty Brigade: The Hero Files oneshot (one page) (2020)

Preceded by Bob Brown	Marvel Two-in-One penciller 1975–1978	Succeeded by Sal Buscema
Preceded by Sal Buscema	The Hulk! penciller 1978–1980	Succeeded by John Buscema
Preceded by Jerry Bingham	Marvel Two-in-One penciller 1980–1983	Succeeded by n/a
Preceded by n/a	The Thing penciller 1983–1986	Succeeded by Paul Neary
