= Superman vs. Muhammad Ali =

Comic book published in 1978

- Front cover art for Superman vs. Muhammad Ali. Art by Neal Adams.

Publication information
- Publisher: DC Comics
- Format: One-shot
- Genre: Superhero
- Publication date: 1978
- No. of issues: All-New Collectors' Edition #C-56
- Main character(s): Superman; Muhammad Ali

Creative team
- Written by: Dennis O'Neil (story); Neal Adams (adaptation)
- Penciller: Neal Adams
- Inker(s): Dick Giordano, Terry Austin
- Letterer: Gaspar Saladino
- Colorist: Cory Adams
- Editor: Julius Schwartz

Collected editions
- Hardcover: ISBN 978-1401-228-41-5

Superman vs. Muhammad Ali is an oversize celebrity comic book published by DC Comics in 1978. The 72-page book features Superman teaming up with the heavyweight boxing champion Muhammad Ali to defeat an alien invasion of Earth, a story in which they are required to compete in a boxing match (without Superman's superpowers). It was based on an original story by Dennis O'Neil which was adapted by Neal Adams, with pencils by Adams, figure inks by Dick Giordano, and background inks by Terry Austin.

== Publication history ==
Superman vs. Muhammad Ali was part of DC's oversized series All-New Collectors' Edition, officially numbered #C-56.

By the late 1970s, Superman had already been joined in the comics pages with guest appearances by real-life American icons such as John F. Kennedy, Steve Allen, Bob Hope, Jerry Lewis, Allen Funt, Don Rickles, and Pat Boone. In 1962, he had gone up against a real-life athlete: professional wrestler Antonino Rocca.

DC editor Julius Schwartz came up with the idea for the comic, which was quickly backed by publisher Jenette Kahn. In 2016, artist Neal Adams told BBC News that during the Seventies, many of DC's writers were liberals of Jewish background and that they understood prejudice; he felt that, at the time (c. 1977), pairing the African American Ali with a mythical white figure like Superman was a subtle political act.

Before the book could be published, DC needed approval from Ali's spiritual leader of the time, Elijah Muhammad of the Nation of Islam. The book suffered numerous delays, going from an original publication date of fall 1977 to spring 1978. By the time the book was published, Ali was no longer World Heavyweight Champion, having been dethroned by Leon Spinks in February 1978. (Note: Marvel Comics took the occasion of Ali no longer being world champion at the time of the book's release to make fun of DC. In The Amazing Spider-Man #186 (Nov. 1978) — written by Marv Wolfman, with art by Keith Pollard and Mike Esposito — a female representative from a comic book publisher (possibly representing then-DC publisher Jenette Kahn) offers Spider-Man the chance to fight then-heavyweight champion Leon Spinks. Spidey refuses, saying that by the time the book hits the stands, "someone else could be champ".) Ali won back the title later that September.

=== 2010 re-issue ===
DC Comics published two hardcover reprint editions of Superman vs. Muhammad Ali in the fall of 2010. One edition reprinted the original story at its original treasury size, while a deluxe edition (featuring a new cover by Neal Adams) included additional content dating back to the original book's publication. By 2018, the re-issue has had six printings, and Superman vs. Muhammad Ali has become one of DC's best-selling comics.

In the 2010 book DC Comics Year By Year: A Visual Chronicle, "Writer/artist Neal Adams proclaimed that Superman vs. Muhammad Ali was 'the best comic book' he and co-writer Denny O'Neil had ever produced." And in 2016, Adams said that he often felt emotional when, in later years, he signed well-read original issues of the comic book for African American readers.

== Plot summary ==
Following a tip, Jimmy Olsen leads his friends Clark Kent (secretly Superman) and Lois Lane into a ghetto district of Metropolis for an exclusive interview with Muhammad Ali. They find him playing basketball with the local kids, but before they can ask him a question, an alien suddenly materializes behind them. This alien behaves arrogantly and rudely, brutally shoving Lois aside, which provokes Ali to retaliate with a boxing strike. Clark, under the pretext of summoning the authorities, runs off, changes into his costume and flies into space, surmising that the alien surely must not have come alone. Indeed, he finds a whole fleet of spaceships in orbit, obviously not on a peaceful errand.

The visitor, named Rat'Lar, is the maniacal leader of a species of aliens called the Scrubb. Under the claim that the Earthlings' dishonorable, war-like and aggressive ways poses a potential threat to his people, he demands that Earth's greatest champion fight the greatest Scrubb fighter, the behemoth Hun'Ya. If Earth refuses, the Scrubb and their huge armada of spaceships will destroy it, and to prove his point, he has his fleet fire plasma-composed missiles at St. Louis and an uninhabited Pacific island. Superman thwarts the missiles from destroying Saint Louis, albeit barely. Superman and Muhammad Ali each come forward to volunteer. However, Ali argues that Superman has an unfair advantage in his many superpowers. Ali also protests that Superman is Kryptonian, whereas he is a native of Earth. Ali, known for his florid self-promotion as "The Greatest", puts himself forward as the obvious choice.

Intrigued, Rat'Lar decides that Superman and Ali should fight one another to see who is really Earth's champion. To make the fight fair, he decrees that the match should take place on his home planet, Bodace, which orbits a red star (whereupon Superman is temporarily powerless). The winner would simply be the best boxer. The two would-be champions decide that Ali will train Superman in the finer points of boxing. They journey to Superman's Fortress of Solitude to have his powers temporarily deactivated, and to use a time warping device to extend Rat'Lar's 24-hour deadline into two months, thus giving Superman more time for training. However, Rat'Lar detects the use of this device and considers it tantamount to cheating. Rat'Lar warns both men that they are to return within one Earth day or he will deploy the missiles on the basis that they have forfeited. Ali is forced to return with Superman, having been given an incomplete regimen.

The match is broadcast on intergalactic television to thousands of other worlds (with Jimmy Olsen acting as broadcaster). With the match underway, it soon becomes apparent that in battling with more or less equal strength, Ali is the superior fighter since Superman generally relied on his incredible strength brought on by Earth's yellow sun to deal with threats quickly. Superman takes a serious pummeling, but somehow refuses to fall down; he stays on his feet all through the beating. Finally, Ali stops the fight, intending to call for a technical knockout, but Superman then falls face-first on the canvas (making the knockout more than technical). Ali personally takes care of Superman and orders him brought back to Earth to recuperate; a move which leaves Hun'Ya pondering.

Now crowned Earth's champion, Ali is set to face Hun'Ya, and to everyone's surprise, the goddess Pallas Athena makes an appearance to relay "the rules of fair play" for this contest into the champions' minds. Rat'Lar then asks Ali to predict at what round the fight will end (Ali was known for predicting the round in which he would knock out his opponent). After some chiding, Ali predicts that he will knock the alien out in the fourth round. Once the match begins, however, Ali quickly starts to suffer from fighting the super-powered Hun'Ya.

Meanwhile, Superman makes a speedy recovery. Disguising himself as Ali cornerman Bundini Brown, he steals into the Scrubb command ship and sabotages their space armada. In his showdown with the armada, Superman is again badly hurt and is left drifting in space.

Miraculously, Ali gets a second wind. In the predicted fourth round, he not only knocks the alien champion out, but out of the ring as well. Yet after witnessing Superman's decimation of his forces, the Scrubb leader cries foul and decides to destroy the now helpless Earth anyway. Just as Rat'Lar is about to give the go-ahead to his backup forces, his own champion Hun'Ya becomes enraged at Rat'Lar's treachery and deposes him, stopping the annihilation attack.

Superman is rescued and once again revived. Hun-ya, the new Scrubb leader, makes peace with Ali, Superman, and all of Earth. The very end of the book shows Ali and Superman in a private moment. Ali reveals that he figured out Superman's secret identity as Clark Kent, but implicitly vows to keep it secret. The book ends with the two champions embracing and Ali proclaiming, "Superman, WE are the greatest!"

== The cover ==
The full wraparound cover of Superman vs. Muhammad Ali.

Superman vs. Muhammad Ali's wraparound cover shows a host of celebrities, including Frank Sinatra, Lucille Ball, Tony Orlando, Johnny Carson, the cast of Welcome Back, Kotter, and The Jackson 5; sharing close-up seating with Lois Lane as well as DC superheroes like Batman, Green Lantern and Wonder Woman, in addition to Warner and DC employees. It also showed then-President Jimmy Carter and his wife Rosalynn.

Joe Kubert was originally asked to draw the cover, and his version (a black-and-white sketch of which still survives) did not feature any celebrities, but just a "normal" raucous crowd of boxing fans. DC did not approve of Kubert's likeness of Ali, nor the overall grim feeling of the piece, and asked Adams to draw the book instead. Adams' original cover illustration (modeled very closely on Kubert's layout), included Mick Jagger in the front cover's lower left corner; he was replaced in the final version by fight promoter Don King.

In 2000, Adams did a riff on this cover — featuring Ali fighting basketball star Michael Jordan — for a special issue of ESPN The Magazine.

In 2016, NECA released a 2-pack set of 7-inch action figures based on Muhammad Ali and Superman as they appeared in the comic.

=== Audience members (selected) ===
"Show-biz personalities"

- The Beatles (with Yoko Ono and Linda McCartney)†
- Kirk Alyn
- Lucille Ball
- Sonny Bono
- Johnny Carson
- Cher
- Dick Clark
- William Conrad
- Phyllis Diller
- The Jackson 5
- Jerry Garcia
- James Garner
- Ron Palillo
- Robert Hegyes
- Ron Howard
- Jack Larson
- Liberace
- Noel Neill
- Tony Orlando
- Donny Osmond
- Marie Osmond
- Christopher Reeve (in glasses)
- Wayne Rogers
- Frank Sinatra
- Raquel Welch
- Wolfman Jack
- Peter Falk (as Columbo)
- Andy Warhol
- Woody Allen
- John Wayne (with a mustache)
- Orson Welles

Political figures

- Gerald Ford
- President Jimmy Carter
- Betty Ford
- Rosalynn Carter

Sports figures

- Jim Bouton
- Pelé
- Drew Bundini Brown
- Don King
- Jabir Herbert Muhammad
- Angelo Dundee
- Joe Namath

Literature and the arts

- Jill Krementz
- Kurt Vonnegut Jr.

DC staffers and other comic book creators

- Neal Adams
- Jack Adler
- Vincente Alcazar
- Sergio Aragones
- Terry Austin
- Cary Bates
- E. Nelson Bridwell
- Tex Blaisdell
- Howard Chaykin
- Vince Colletta
- Trevor Von Eden
- William Gaines
- Dick Giordano
- Mike Gold
- Archie Goodwin
- Jenette Kahn
- Gil Kane
- Joe Kubert
- Bob Layton
- Paul Levitz
- Bob McLeod
- Allen Milgrom
- Dennis O'Neil
- Joe Orlando
- Ralph Reese
- Marshall Rogers
- Julius Schwartz
- Joe Shuster
- Jerry Siegel
- Walt Simonson
- Greg Theakston
- Bob Wiacek
- Wallace Wood
- Bernie Wrightson

DC (and Mad magazine) characters

- Boston Brand (Deadman)
- Barry Allen (Flash)
- Iris Allen
- Wally West (Kid Flash)
- Batman
- Barbara Gordon (Batgirl)
- Dick Grayson (Robin)
- Morgan Edge
- Plastic Man
- Hal Jordan (Green Lantern)
- Carol Ferris (Star Sapphire)
- Clark Kent
- Dinah Lance (Black Canary)
- Lois Lane
- Lex Luthor
- Ms. Mystic
- Alfred E. Neuman
- Jimmy Olsen
- Alfred Pennyworth
- Diana Prince (Wonder Woman)
- J'onn J'onzz (Martian Manhunter)
- Rac Shade (Shade the Changing Man)
- Donna Troy (Wonder Girl)
- Oliver Queen (Green Arrow)
- Ray Palmer (Atom)

† Not included in the character guide found on the inside cover.
