= Continuity Associates =

Comics art and illustration studio

- Trade name: Continuity Studios
- Formerly: Continuity Graphics Associates
- Type: Comics and illustration studio
- Founded: 1971; 55 years ago
- Founders: Neal Adams; Dick Giordano
- Defunct: c. 2022
- Headquarters: 15 West 39th Street, New York City, United States
- Services: Comic book art & packaging, commercial illustration, advertising art, storyboards, animatics, 3D computer graphics, conceptual design
- Owner: Neal Adams
- Members: Cory Adams; Kristine Adams Stone; Terry Austin; Liz Berube; Pat Broderick; Howard Chaykin; Larry Hama; Bob Layton; Val Mayerik; Bob McLeod; Al Milgrom; Win Mortimer; Carl Potts; Ralph Reese; Joe Rubinstein; Walt Simonson; Jim Starlin; Greg Theakston; Bob Wiacek
- Website: nealadamsproductions.com

Continuity Studios (formerly Continuity Associates, originally known as Continuity Graphics Associates) was a New York City and Los Angeles–based art and illustration studio formed by cartoonists Neal Adams and Dick Giordano. For fifty years the company showed that the graphic vernacular of the comic book could be employed in profitable endeavors outside the confines of traditional comics.

== History ==
At its founding in 1971, Continuity primarily supplied motion picture storyboards and advertising art. As times changed, Continuity adapted its services to offer animatics, 3D computer graphics, and conceptual design.

Over the years, Continuity also served as an art packager for comic book publishers, including such companies as Charlton Comics, Marvel Comics, Adams' own Continuity Comics, and the one-shot Big Apple Comix. The company served as the launching pad for the careers of a number of professional cartoonists. When doing collective comics work, the artists were often credited as "Crusty Bunkers".

More established cartoonists like Win Mortimer found work at Continuity profitable enough that they left the comics industry to work exclusively on Continuity projects.

A snapshot of the studio in 1977–1978 came in the form of the wraparound cover for the oversize celebrity comic book Superman vs. Muhammad Ali—illustrated by Continuity co-founders Neal Adams and Dick Giordano—which portrayed Jack Abel, Mark Alexander, Joe Barney, Pat Bastine, Cary Bates, Joe Brozowski, Joe D'Esposito, John Fuller, Michael Netzer (Nasser), Carl Potts, Ralph Reese, Marshall Rogers, Trevor Von Eeden, and Bob Wiacek as members of "Neal Adams' Continuity Associates".

== Continuity Associates members ==
Creators who at one time or another were members of Continuity Associates:

- Jack Abel
- Mark Alexander
- Terry Austin
- Joe Barney
- Pat Bastine
- Cary Bates
- Liz Berube
- Pat Broderick
- Joe Brozowski
- Howard Chaykin
- Denys Cowan
- Joe D'Esposito
- Lindley Farley
- Dennis Francis
- John Fuller
- Al Gordon
- Larry Hama
- Bob Layton
- Val Mayerik
- Bob McLeod
- Al Milgrom
- Louis Mitchell
- Steve Mitchell
- Win Mortimer
- Michael Netzer (Nasser)
- Carl Potts
- Ralph Reese
- Marshall Rogers
- Josef Rubinstein
- Walt Simonson
- Jim Starlin
- Greg Theakston
- Trevor Von Eeden
- Bob Wiacek

== See also ==
- Crusty Bunkers
- Continuity Comics
