= Zero Patrol =

1984 comic book series

Publication information
- Publisher: Continuity Comics
- Schedule: Monthly
- Format: Ongoing series
- Publication date: November 1984 - February 1985; August 1987 – May 1989
- No. of issues: 2
- Main character: Zero Patrol

Creative team
- Created by: Esteban Maroto
- Penciller: various

The Zero Patrol was a short-lived superhero team created by Continuity Comics in 1984.

The Zero Patrol were a team of five people from Earth, collected to protect the universe. The series was a European comic originally titled Cinco por infinito or 5 Infinity, otherwise known as 5 for Infinity, a successful Spanish comic produced between 1968 and 1970 written and drawn by Esteban Maroto, with Neal Adams supplying a new story and artwork. The original comic was featured in Delta 99 and Dracula. The title Zero Patrol for these American series came from Neal Adams' own previous comics - never published - based on material of his drawn and written years before. The Zero Patrol team consisted of Dr. Zero, Orion, Heather, Bruce, Alter, and Lanie in edit version. The characters were Alter, Aline, Orion, Serio and Honda in original comic. Originally the book ran for only two issues in 1984 and 1985. Then the first two issues were reprinted and the series ran for a total of five issues in 1987–89, before Continuity Comics closed down.
