= Liz Berube =

American comic book artist (1943–2021)

Liz Safian-Berube
- Born: Elizabeth Ann Safian; January 7, 1943 Brooklyn, New York
- Died: January 15, 2021 (aged 78)
- Areas: Cartoonist, Penciller, Inker, Editor, Colourist
- Pseudonyms: Elizabeth; Liz Safian
- Notable works: Karen; DC romance comics

Elizabeth Safian Berube (January 7, 1943 – January 15, 2021) was an American comic book artist, best known as a romance comics artist for DC Comics in the 1970s. Simply signing her work "Elizabeth," her modern, stylized art was used to illustrate fashion features, horoscope pages, tables of contents, and other various ornamental pieces. She was also a prolific colorist, first for Archie Comics and later for DC. Throughout her career she worked on children’s books, greeting cards, and other commissioned work.

== Biography ==
Berube was born in Brooklyn, New York, where she was influenced by Pogo and EC Comics, as well as the movie Fantasia. Fine arts influences included Alphonse Mucha, and the Art Deco and Art Nouveau movements.

She attended Martin Van Buren High School in Queens (graduating at age 16 in 1959), where she started a comic strip for the school newspaper, which has been continued by different students to this day. She studied cartooning at the School of Visual Arts from 1959 to 1961.

After leaving SVA, Berube became a colorist and assistant editor for Archie Comics, continuing at that publisher in various freelance capacities until 1975. In the early 1960s, she met DC editor Jack Adler, who later brought her into the publisher.

In the late 1960s, her newspaper strip, Karen, (credited to her maiden name "Elizabeth Ann Safian") was carried by Newsday Syndicate in 40 newspapers at its peak. Berube had called Karen "my alter ego."

In 1969 she began working on DC’s romance comics line, bringing more modern, stylized art to the genre, which was still being drawn in the realistic style that had become parodied (particularly by Roy Lichtenstein) in Pop Art. One of the few women in the field, Berube worked on such titles as Date with Debbi, Falling in Love, Girls' Love Stories, Girls' Romances, Heart Throbs, Secret Hearts, Young Love, and Young Romance. At some point during this period, Berube was offered the position of editor of the whole line, but as a single mother in her mid-twenties, she preferred the flexibility of working from home that pencilling and coloring allowed, and declined. The DC romance line folded a few years later; Berube was the last female contributor.

From the mid-1970s through the 1980s Berube worked as a colorist, mostly for DC. She was known for mixing her own hues and marking the combinations for the printing separators. She also did coloring for Neal Adams’ Continuity Studios in the mid-to-late 1980s. Berube credits Jack Adler and Corey Adams (Neal Adams' wife) for teaching her the techniques of comics coloring.

== Personal life and death ==
Her son David was born in 1965; she raised him as a single mother. In 1981, Berube moved from New York City to Maine. She returned to New York in the mid-1980s. In 1999, Berube moved to Bandon, Oregon, and by 2001 had relocated to Jerome, Arizona. She later lived in Scottsdale, Arizona.

Berube died on January 15, 2021.
