= Vicente Alcazar =

Spanish comics artist

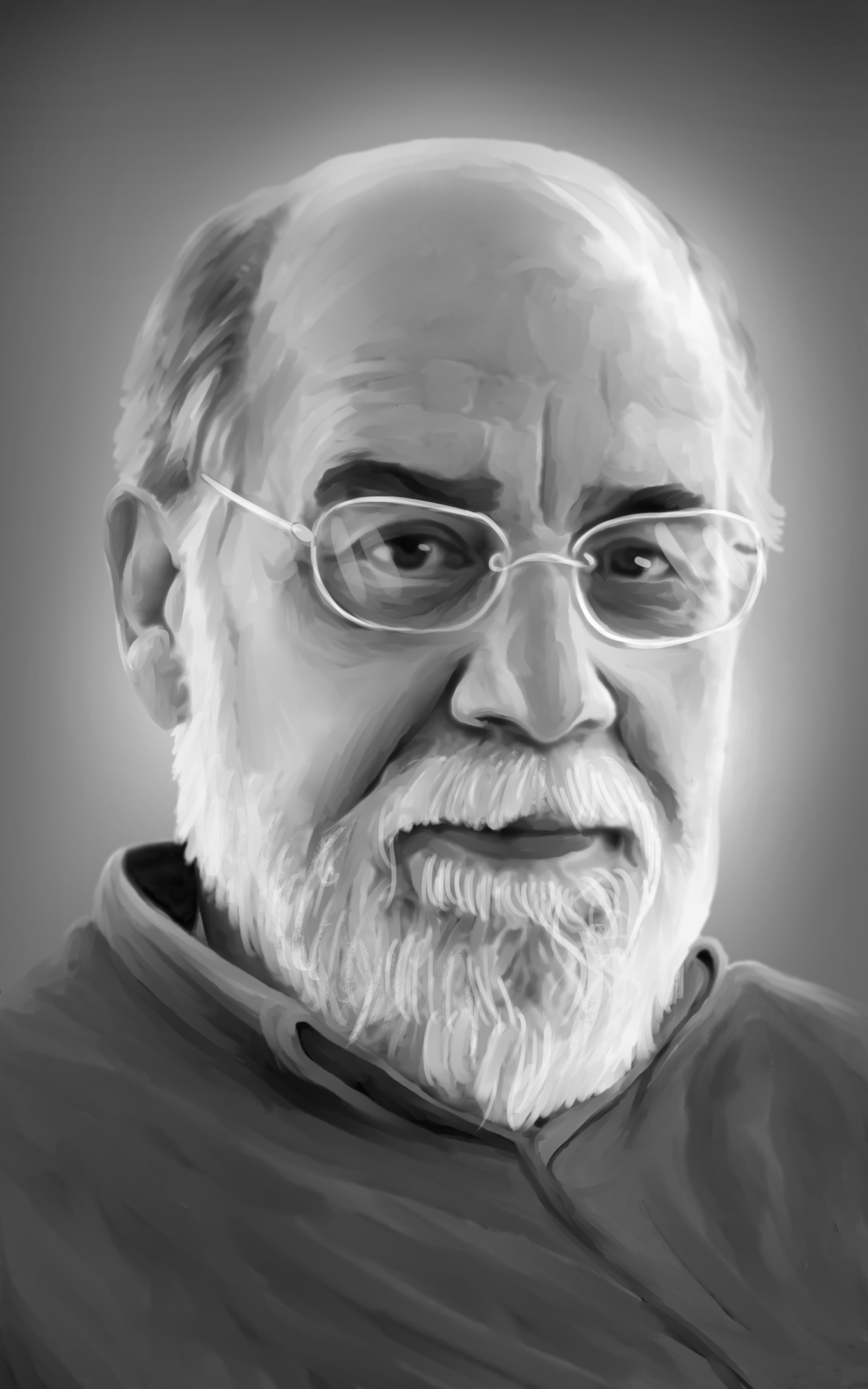
- Portrait of Vicente Alcazar by Kevlar.
- Born: Vicente Alcazar; July 8, 1944 (age 82) Madrid, Spain
- Areas: Penciller, Inker
- Pseudonyms: Vincente Alcazar; CARVIC
- Notable works: Jonah Hex

Vicente Alcazar (born July 8, 1944) is a Spanish comics artist best known for his work for the American comic-book publishers DC Comics and Marvel Comics, including a 1970s run on the DC Western character Jonah Hex.

His name is sometimes mis-credited as "Vincente" Alcazar.

== Career ==
Born in Madrid, Spain, Alcazar began his career in the 1960s. He collaborated with fellow artist Carlos Pino under the dual pseudonym CARVIC, drawing war stories for the magazine Chío (1967) and for UK publications and companies, including War Picture Library. The team additionally drew stories based on the U.S. television series Star Trek for issues #74-105 of City Magazines' 1969-1971 weekly British magazine TV21.

At the recommendation of artist Gray Morrow, then editing then Archie Comics' imprint Red Circle Comics, American publishers began using Alcazar's work in the mid-1970s. Alcazar's first credited U.S. work appears in four publications cover-dated December 1973: penciling and inking the six-page stories "Suicide ...Maybe" and "A Thousand Pounds of Clay" in the Archie/Red Circle comic book Chilling Adventures in Sorcery #4; penciling the two-page story "The Old School" in Warren Publishing's black-and-white horror-comics magazine Creepy #58; and inking penciler Rich Buckler's cover of Marvel Comics' black-and-white horror-comics magazine Vault of Evil #8. He had been recommended to Marvel by artist Neal Adams.

Alcazar quickly became a regular freelancer for Archie, Marvel, Warren, and soon DC Comics and Charlton Comics, primarily drawing horror stories but also sword-and-sorcery (drawing the cover and inking penciler Val Mayerik's "Thongor! Warrior of Lost Lemuria" feature in Marvel's Creatures on the Loose #27, Jan. 1974); war comics (DC's Star-Spangled War Stories #178 (Feb. 1974); and science fiction (the Larry Niven short story adaptation "...Not Long Before The End" in Marvel's black-and-white comics magazine Unknown Worlds of Science Fiction #3, May 1975; and stories in Charlton's similar Space: 1999 #6-8, Aug.-Oct. 1976).

Writer Shaqui Le Vesconte said of Alcazar's Space: 1999, "His style was very Gothic and experimental, using a variety of techniques that could be described as 'monochrome psychedelic', and matching the nightmarish feel of episodes like 'Missing Link', 'End of Eternity' and 'Dragon's Domain'".

After inking penciler Ernie Chan on DC's Jonah Hex #8 (Jan. 1978), he became that Western series' regular penciler and inker beginning with #12 (May 1978), working with writer Michael Fleisher. He continued through #22 (March 1979) and additionally drew #27 (Aug. 1979).

Alcazar's comics work tapered off in the early 1980s. He wrote and drew the eight-page story "Paradise" in the comics-anthology magazine Heavy Metal vol. 5, #4 (July 1981), and penciled the Marvel superhero comic Moon Knight #21 (July 1982), his last known comics work until 1993, when he penciled an issue each of Continuity Comics' Megalith #2 (June 1993) and Earth 4 #3 (Aug. 1993). In 2011, he began penciling, inking, and digital coloring the Vices Press series M3, which won the 2012 award for Best Comic Book at the Burbank International Film Festival. He did some work for Archie Comics' Afterlife with Archie in 2014, and the following year began drawing for the D. C. Thomson & Co. series Commando.

As of mid-2007, he is married to documentary filmmaker Amanda Lucena.
