= Josh Adams (illustrator) =

American comic book and commercial artist

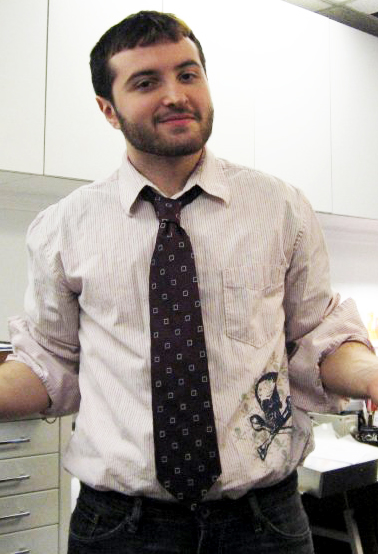
- Josh Adams in his studio
- Born: 1987 (age 38–39)
- Areas: Penciller, Illustrator, designer
- Notable works: House of Mystery; Eureka; Stargate SG-1; Battlestar Galactica; ECW on Syfy; Ghost Hunters
- Spouse: Saori Tsujimoto-Adams

Josh Adams (born 1987) is an American comic book and commercial artist best known for his work on House of Mystery for DC Comics, as well as design work for on the Syfy Channel. Josh Adams is also the youngest of comic book veteran Neal Adams's three sons. Adams' two older brothers, Jason and Joel, are also artists who work in commercial sculpture and comic book illustration

== Career ==
Adams graduated from the School of Visual Arts with a BFA in cartooning in 2009.

Adams performed "full pencil assists" DC/Vertigo's House of Mystery #13. In addition, he worked for his father's production studio Continuity Studios on Marvel Comics' Astonishing X-Men: Motion Comic. Adams penciled a cover pinup of Batman in 2009, and included in issue No. 1 of the 2010 miniseries Batman: Odyssey, written and illustrated by his father.

His production art credits for the Syfy Channel, include Battlestar Galactica, Stargate SG-1, Eureka, and Ghost Hunters. Adams comics work includes the miniseries SPIT and the creator-owned project STRAIN.

In late 2011, Josh Adams penciled and inked Doctor Who, for IDW Publishing.

He also writes as a pundit for Rich Johnston's website, Bleeding Cool.

In 2022, Adams was a co-winner of the Pulitzer Prize for Illustrated Reporting and Commentary for his art direction of the comics journalism story, "How I Escaped a Chinese Internment Camp," published by Insider.

== Personal life ==
Adams is married to Saori Tsujimoto. He proposed to her in August 2013, presenting to her a ring that he had designed himself, embedded with the face of Jake the Dog from the animated TV series Adventure Time. They planned to wed at that year's New York Comic Con.
