= Jax and the Hellhound =

- The début of Jax and Mulu online, cover art by Dennis Francis.

Publication information
- Publisher: Blackthorne Publishing
- Schedule: Erratic
- Format: Limited series
- Genre: Crime, fantasy
- Publication date: November 1986 – 1987
- No. of issues: 3

Creative team
- Created by: Dennis Morales Francis

Jax and the Hellhound is a limited series comic book by Dennis Morales Francis and published by Blackthorne Publishing.

The series was about a young man who traveled around the world helping the U.S. government fight the bad guys and helping a canine demon keep the really bad creatures from entering Earth. The combination of 1980's futility of the war on drugs mirrored the fantasy aspects of the policing of inter-dimensional space.

== Plot ==
Jacob (Jax) Marosco is mentored by Mulu, a Dimensional Occult Guardian. The three issue storyline centered on the demi-god Jareda who wished to attempt a resurrection on Earth. Jax and Mulu are committed to stopping him at any cost, including their lives.

The story covered the war on drugs, mysticism, and a romantic relationship with an older woman. Jax and the Hellhound was part of Blackthorne Publishing's black and white comics lineup.

Dennis Morales Francis also co-created Street Wolf along with Mark-Wayne Harris. He also penciled XL, Locke, Major Lancer and the Starlight Squadron and other books for DC Comics, Blackthorne Publishing, Eclipse Comics and other publishers.

The Jax and the Hellhound series was resurrected by Dennis Morales Francis as a full color graphic novel series.
