= Roachmill =

- Cover to Roachmill No. 1 (December 1986).

Publication information
- Publisher: Blackthorne Publishing; Dark Horse Comics
- Schedule: Bimonthly
- Format: Standard
- Publication date: December 1986 – December 1990
- No. of issues: 16
- Main character: Roachmill

Creative team
- Written by: Rich Hedden; Tom McWeeney
- Artist(s): Rich Hedden; Tom McWeeney

Roachmill is an American comic book created by Rich Hedden and Tom McWeeney, published first by Blackthorne Publishing and then by Dark Horse Comics.

== Publication history ==
Blackthorne Publishing put out the first six issues of Roachmill before creators Hedden and McWeeney were lured away by Dark Horse Comics. Dark Horse published an additional ten issues before the series was canceled. Dark Horse also published a special introductory Roachmill story in Dark Horse Presents No. 17 (April 1988), to announce the acquisition of the character. Additional Roachmill stories have been published in Dark Horse Presents issues No. 28 (March 1989), 139 (January 1999) and the Dark Horse Presents Fifth Anniversary Special (April 1991).

Solo stories featuring Roachmill's rival Zoo-Lou have been published in Munden's Bar Annual No. 2 (published in March 1991, by First Comics) and in Dark Horse Presents No. 67 (November 1992). Roachmill and Zoo-Lou also made cameos in San Diego Comic-Con Comics No. 1 (August 1992).

Two trade paperback collections were issued. The first, Roachmill Book 1: Framed (1988), collects the first four issues. The second, Roachmill Book 2: The Greatest Roachmill Stories Ever Told (1989), features the final two Blackthorne issues, and the Roachmill stories from Dark Horse Presents issues No. 17 and 28. Both books were published by Dark Horse.

== Series overview ==
The comic is set in 30th-century New York where an influx of aliens to Earth has caused social problems. In response, the Extermination Act is enacted, a law that allows anyone who carries a gun to use lethal force in "alien-related" situations. Eventually, the law is extended to allow the killing of humans as well, allowing for the creation of licensed Exterminators. Roachmill – a tall Dirty Harry-era Clint Eastwood lookalike with two extra cockroach arms extending from his abdomen – is one such Exterminator, willing – for a price – to kill anyone or anything. The stories veered wildly between comedy, satire, and serious sci-fi and the art between cartoony and realistic, sometimes in the same issue.
