= Ms. Mystic =

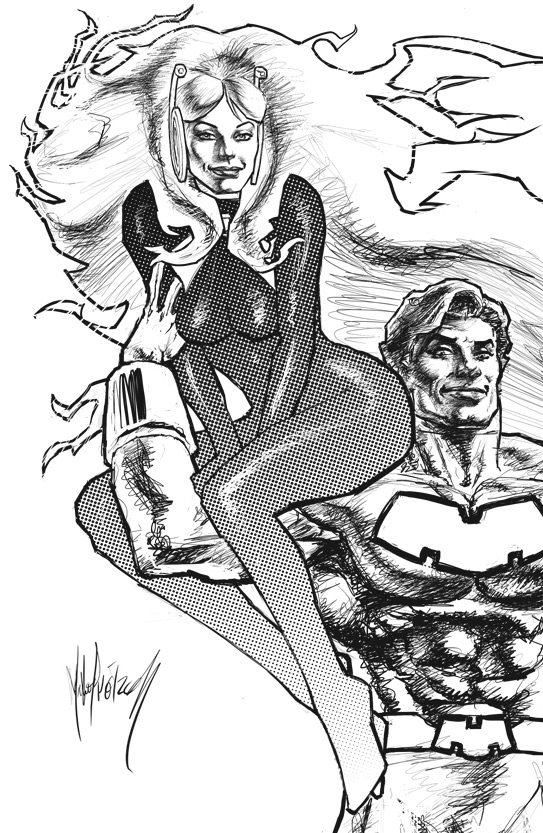
- Ms. Mystic sketch by Michael Netzer

Publication information
- Publisher: Pacific Comics; Continuity Comics
- First appearance: Captain Victory and the Galactic Rangers #3 (March 1982)
- Created by: Neal Adams

In-story information
- Alter ego: Unknown
- Team affiliations: Urth 4
- Abilities: Spellcasting, flight, ability to summon mystical sword of light, elemental powers

Ms. Mystic is a comic book superhero created by comic book artist/writers Neal Adams and Michael Netzer. The character's first full appearance was in Captain Victory and the Galactic Rangers #3 (March 1982), published by Pacific Comics. After Pacific published two issues, the character was published by Adams' own company Continuity Comics, for a total of nine issues between 1982 and 1994.

== Fictional character biography ==
Ms. Mystic is a genuine witch who was burned at the stake during the Salem witch trials (1692–1695). Her soul transferred to another plane, and returned to Earth in the modern world. She is strongly concerned with environmental issues. Mystic has long white hair down to her ankles, wears a set of golden spirals in her hair which resemble the insect-antenna of faeries, and her costume is basically a black spandex catsuit created with Zip-A-Tone.

== Powers and abilities ==
Ms. Mystic is a magician; her ability to wield magic also gives her the power of flight, the ability to summon a sword of light, and undefined "Elemental powers".

She can also call upon Mother Nature for assistance. Ms. Mystic once called upon Mother Nature for help, and she responded by creating the superhero team Urth 4, who are strongly influenced by the Fantastic Four, a group of four superheroes based on the four classical Greek elements.

== Controversy over co-creation ==
In 1993 comics artist Michael Netzer sued Neal Adams for credit and misappropriation of a jointly created property, claiming that he initially conceived the character of Ms. Mystic at the behest of DC Comics' art director Vince Colletta in 1977, and went on to co-create the character with Adams. The suit was subsequently dismissed in the United States District Court for the Southern District of New York on grounds of the Statute of limitations. Netzer later publicly apologized for the grief caused to Adams by the litigation and acknowledged Adams' sole ownership of the character, while maintaining his claim to initial co-authorship. In 2018 Netzer posted a long attack on Adams on his Facebook page, in response to an interview Adams gave to the magazine Back Issue!.
