= Blackthorne Publishing =

Defunct American comic book publisher

Blackthorne Publishing Inc.
- Industry: Comics
- Founded: 1985
- Founder: Steve Schanes; Ann Fera
- Defunct: 1990
- Headquarters: El Cajon, California, U.S.
- Key people: John Stephenson (editor-in-chief)

Blackthorne Publishing Inc. was an American comic book publisher that flourished from 1986 to 1989. They were notable for the Blackthorne 3-D Series, their reprint titles of classic comic strips like Dick Tracy, and their licensed products. Blackthorne achieved its greatest sales and financial success with their licensed 3-D comics adaptations of the California Raisins, but the financial loss suffered by the failure of their 3-D adaptation of Michael Jackson's film Moonwalker was a major contributor to the publisher's downfall.

== History ==
Blackthorne was established in 1985 by husband-and-wife team Steve Schanes and Ann Fera, formerly associated with Pacific Comics (which had gone out of business in 1984). After Schanes was fired from Pacific Comics, he needed a job in order to pay debts for himself and family. Schanes and Fera decided to raise $16,000 to start Blackthorne (naming the company after the street on which they lived), mostly using their credit cards.

Blackthorne's first title was Jerry Iger's Classic Sheena, with a cover date of April 1985, featuring Sheena, Queen of the Jungle reprints and a new Dave Stevens cover (the book had originally been slated as a Pacific Comics release). Despite early struggles due to their limited funds, Blackthorne steadily expanded during its first years. To increase their profitability and visibility, the company employed sales representatives which sold their comics to retail stores not covered by any comic book distributors, such as Hallmark Cards, Spencer Gifts, and 7-Elevens nationwide. By the end of 1987, according to Schanes, the company was publishing 22 comic books a month and was distributing to 900–1,200 gift stores not covered by comics distributors. Meanwhile, Blackthorne earned praise from critics and hobbyists for its reprints of classic newspaper comic strips. Schanes chose to do newspaper strip reprints because they required less financial investment and because there was little competition in the field at the time. Blackthorne immediately bought the rights for 60 different newspaper strips, even though they knew they wouldn't be able to produce most of them for years at best, to lock out any competition in the field.

In addition to their comic book line, Blackthorne published paperback books and created faux books for movie props; for instance, the comic books and technical manuals seen in the film Russkies are all props crafted by Blackthorne Publishing.

In 1987, however, with the company losing money on its color line, it canceled those titles to focus on its 3-D books and black-and-white licensed products. Blackthorne also suffered from the contemporaneous financial troubles of the Los Angeles–based distributor Sunrise Distribution. Sunrise went bankrupt in 1988, and although Blackthorne (along with fellow West Coast publisher Fantagraphics) sued the distributor, they were never able to recoup their losses. This in turn led to Blackthorne being audited by the federal government in 1988.

In early 1989, the company was still the fifth-largest U.S. comics publisher, bringing in about $1 million in sales and boasting a staff of eight full-time editorial and production employees. They published about 240 different titles a year, with an average print run of about 10,000 copies each. The company made a fatal error, however, when they signed on to adapt the Michael Jackson film Moonwalker to a 3-D comic book. The publisher paid a large licensing fee for the property and when the Moonwalker comic flopped later that year, they experienced a large financial loss.

By mid-1989 the company was outsourcing its operations, and in November the company laid off eight of its nine employees, including editor-in-chief John Stephenson. $180,000 in debt, Blackthorne limped into 1990 before it finally folded.

== Titles ==
=== Original series ===
- Adventures in the Mystwood, 1 issue
- Alien Ducklings, 4 issues
- Alien Worlds graphic novel
- Atomic Man Comics, 3 issues
- Blackthorne's 3-in-1, 2 issues
- Blackthorne's Harvey Flip Book Sad Sack/Stumbo, 1 issue
- Brik Hauss, 1 issue
- Cold Blooded Chameleon Commandos, 5 issues
- Crow of the Bear Clan, 6 issues
- Danse, 1 issue
- Dogaroo, 1 issue
- Duckbots, 2 issues
- Enchanted Valley, 2 issues
- Failed Universe, 1 issue – New Universe parody
- Figments, 3 issues
- Fragments (Black), 2 issues
- Freak-Out on Infant Earths, 2 issues – Crisis on Infinite Earths parody
- The Gift, 1 issue
- Ground Pound! Comix , 1 issue
- Hamster Vice, 6 issues – Miami Vice parody
- Jack Hunter (Vol. 1, color), 1 issue
- Jack Hunter (Vol. 11, Prestige format B&W), 3 issues
- Jax and the Hellhound, 3 issues
- Labor Force, 8 issues
- Lann graphic novel
- Laffin' Gas, 12 issues
- Legion Of Stupid Heroes, 1 issue – Legion of Super-Heroes parody
- Mad Dog Magazine, 3 issues
- The Man of Rust, 1 issue
- Midnite, 3 issues
- Mr. Cream Puff, 1 issue
- Nervous Rex, 10 issues
- Of Myths and Men, 2 issues
- Omega Elite, 1 issue
- Omni Men, 1 issue
- Operative: Scorpio graphic novel
- Outposts, 1 issue
- Pajama Chronicles, 1 issue
- Planet Comics, 3 issues
- Possibleman, 2 issues
- Pre-Teen Dirty-Gene Kung Fu Kangaroos, 3 issues – Teenage Mutant Ninja Turtles parody
- Red Heat, 2 issues
- Revolving Doors, 3 issues
- Roachmill, 6 issues
- Rivit, 1 issue
- Serius Bounty Hunter, 3 issues
- Shuriken graphic novel
- Starlight Squadron, 1 issue
- Street Poet Ray, 2 issues
- Street Wolf, 3 issues
- To Die For, 1 issue
- Timeline Color Comics, 1 issue (?)
- Tracker, 2 issues
- Twisted Tantrums of the Purple Snit, 2 issues
- Wings Comics graphic novel
- Wizards of the Last Resort, 4 issues
- Wolph, 1 issue
- Xeno-Men, 1 issue
- X-L, graphic novel

=== Blackthorne 3-D Series ===
81 issues

- 3-D Bullwinkle & Rocky, 1 issue
- 3-D Bullwinkle For President In 3-D, 1 issue
- 3-D Heroes, 1 issue
- 3-D Sports Hall of Shame, 1 issue
- Adventures of Capt. Holo 3-D, 1 issue
- Baby Huey 3-D, 1 issue
- BattleTech 3-D, 1 issue
- Betty Boop 3-D, 1 issue
- Bizarre 3-D Zone, 1 issue
- Bozo the Clown in 3-D, 3 issues
- Bravestarr in 3-D, 2 issues
- California Raisins in 3-D, 5 issues
- California Raisins: The Ultimate Collection trade paperback
- Captain Holo in 3-D, 1 issue
- Casper in 3-D, 1 issue
- Classic Jungle Comics, 1 issue
- Dick Tracy in 3-D, 1 issue
- The Flintstones in 3-D, 4 issues
- G.I. Joe in 3-D, 6 issues
- G.I. Joe in 3-D Annual, 1 issue
- Goldyn in 3-D, 1 issue
- Gumby 3-D, 7 issues
- Hamster Vice in 3-D, 2 issues
- Kull 3-D, 2 issues
- Lars of Mars in 3-D, 1 issue
- Laurel & Hardy in 3-D, 2 issues
- Little Dot 3-D, 1 issue
- Little Nemo in Slumberland 3-D, 1 issue
- Merlin Realm in 3-D, 1 issue
- Moonwalker in 3-D, 1 issue
- The Noid in 3-D, 2 issues
- Playful Little Audrey in 3-D, 1 issue
- Rambo in 3-D, 1 issue
- Rambo III 3-D, 1 issue
- Red Heat 3-D, 1 issue
- Red Sonja 3-D, 1 issue
- Richie Rich and Casper 3-D, 1 issue
- Sad Sack 3-D, 1 issue
- Salimba 3-D, 2 issues
- Sheena 3-D Special, 1 issue
- Solomon Kane 3-D, 1 issue
- Sports Hall of Shame in 3-D, 1 issue
- Star Wars 3-D, 3 issues
- Transformers in 3-D, 3 issues
- To Die For 3-D, 1 issue
- Twisted Tales 3-D, 1 issue
- Underdog 3-D, 1 issue
- Waxwork 3-D, 1 issue
- Wendy in 3-D, 1 issue
- Werewolf 3-D, 1 issue

=== Licensed and reprint titles ===
- Battle Beasts, 4 Issues
- BattleForce, 2 issues
- BattleTech, 6 issues
- BattleTech Annual
- Beyond Mars, 5 issues (later released as two-part trade paperback)
- Comic Strip Preserves series
  - Annie, trade paperback
  - Betty Boop, 3 issues
  - Blondie, trade paperback
  - Boner's Ark, 1 issue
  - Brenda Starr Reporter, 2 issues
  - Broom Hilda, 1 issue
  - Katzenjammer Kids, 1 issue
  - Mary Worth, 1 issue
  - Smokey Stover, 1 issue
  - Steve Roper and the Wahoo, 2 issues
  - Tales of the Green Beret, 3 issues
- Dick Tracy series
  - Dick Tracy Book, 21 issues
  - Dick Tracy (Reuben series), 24 issues
  - Dick Tracy Monthly/Weekly, 99 issues
  - Dick Tracy Special, 3 issues
  - Dick Tracy: The Early Years, 4 issues
  - Dick Tracy: The Unprinted Stories, 4 issues
  - Dick Tracy trade paperback
- The Iger Comics Kingdom trade paperback
- Jerry Iger's Classic Jumbo Comics, 1 issue
- Jerry Iger's Classic Sheena Queen of the Jungle, 1 issue
- Jerry Iger's Classics Wings Comics, 1 issue
- Jerry Iger's Golden Features, 7 issues
- Jerry Iger's National Comics trade paperback
- Jungle Comics, 4 issues
- Kerry Drake, 5 issues
- Kirby: King of the Serials, 1 issue
- Little Nemo in Slumberland, 2 issues
- Li'l Abner (Reuben Series) trade paperback
- Official How to Draw series
  - Official How to Draw G.I. Joe, 3 issues
  - Official How to Draw Robotech, 14 issues
  - Official How to Draw Transformers, 6 issues
- On Stage by Leonard Starr trade paperback
- Prince Valiant graphic novel, 2 issues
- Rambo, 1 issue
- Rambo III, 1 issue
- Rover from Gasoline Alley, 1 issue
- Salimba graphic novel
- Star Hawks, 4 issues
- Stories of the West, 2 issues
- Tales of the Jackalope, 7 issues
- Tarzan, 1 issue
- Waxwork, 1 issue
- Werewolf, 5 issues
