= Continuity Comics =

Defunct American independent comic book publishing company

- Parent company: Continuity Publishing
- Founded: 1984
- Founder: Neal Adams
- Defunct: 1994
- Country of origin: United States
- Headquarters location: New York City
- Key people: Peter Stone
- Publication types: Comic books
- Fiction genres: Superhero

Continuity Publishing, also known as Continuity Comics, was an American independent comic book company formed by Neal Adams in 1984, publishing comics until 1994.

== History ==
After years as a freelancer and comics art packager (with his company Continuity Associates), in 1984 Adams ventured into publishing as a way to maximize his creative freedom (and profits). Continuity mainly published a variety of superhero comics developed by Adams. For instance, the title Ms. Mystic was first published by Pacific Comics, and was revived in 1987 by Continuity.

Adams' own detailed, realistic art was the basis of Continuity's "house style"; the company's creators included Dan Barry, Vicente Alcazar, Mike Deodato, Jr., Mark Texeira, Dave Hoover, Richard Bennett, Tom Grindberg, Bart Sears, Esteban Maroto, and Michael Netzer. Adams often provided layouts for the company's titles, as well as inking many faces and contributing other personal touch-up artwork. Adams also plotted many of Continuity's titles, most of which were scripted by writer Peter Stone.

Continuity's comics tended to be grittier than the mainstream Marvel or DC comics of their day, often depicting bloody, graphic violence. For instance, in one issue of Armor the title character has his hand chopped off and then the appendage is destroyed in a blender. Continuity was also part of a trend towards more eroticism in mainstream comics. For instance, the costume and the cover artwork illustrated by Mark Beachum for the character Samuree were often revealing, and she was sometimes drawn in sexy poses on the cover of her comic.

During the 1990s "variant cover" craze, Continuity got into Tyvek (marketed as "indestructible"), die-cut, glow-in-the-dark, chrome-plated, and hologram covers, as well as pull-out posters, stickers, and trading cards, all of which are associated with the speculation bubble which burst in the mid-1990s. Continuity also bought into the crossover craze of the era with Deathwatch 2000 (1992–1993) and Rise of Magic (1993–1994).

Over the course of its life as a publisher, Continuity was the subject of much criticism from comics retailers and fans for poor editorial oversight and the publisher's inability to ship its products on time or according to schedule.

Continuity stopped publishing in 1994 during its Rise of Magic crossover, embroiled in legal and financial troubles. Several of Continuity's later titles and characters wound up being picked up by other publishers. For instance, Samuree, Valeria and Knighthawk would be published by Valiant Comics' Windjammer line of creator-owned titles.

== Titles ==
- Armor (13 issues, 1985–1992; 6 issues, 1993)
- Bucky O'Hare (graphic novel, 1986; 5 issues, 1991–1992)
- Captain Power and the Soldiers of the Future (2 issues, 1988–1989)
- Crazyman (3 issues, 1992; 4 issues, 1993–1994)
- Cyberrad (7 issues, 1992–93; 1 issue, 1993; 2 issues 1992–1993)
- Echo of Futurepast (9 issues, 1984–1986)
- Hybrids (4 issues, 1993; 1 issues, 1994)
- Hybrids: The Origin (6 issues, 1993–1994)
- Megalith (9 issues, 1989–1993; 8 issues, 1993–1994)
- Ms. Mystic (9 issues, 1987–1992; 1–3, 1993; 1–4, 1993–1994)
- The Revengers featuring Megalith (6 issues, 1985–1989)
- Samuree (9 issues, 1987–1991; 4 issues, 1993–1994)
- Shaman (1 issue, 1994)
- Toyboy (7 issues, 1986–1989)
- Urth 4 (4 issues, 1989–1990); renamed Earth 4 (3 issues, 1993; 4 issues, 1993–1994)
- Valeria, She-Bat (2 issues, 1993; no issues #2–4)
- Zero Patrol (2 issues, 1984–1985; 5 issues, 1987–1989)

=== Crossovers ===
- Deathwatch 2000
  - Armor (#1–3, 1993)
  - Cyberrad (#1–2, 1992/93)
  - Earth 4 (#1–3, 1993)
  - Hybrids (#0–3, 1993)
  - Megalith (#0–3, 1993)
  - Ms. Mystic (#1–3, 1993)
- Rise of Magic
  - Armor (#4–6, 1993)
  - Hybrids (#1, 1994)
  - Megalith (#4–7, 1993/94)
  - Ms. Mystic (#2–4, 1993/94)
  - Samuree (#1–4, 1993/94)
  - Shaman (#0, 1994)
  - Valeria, She-Bat (#5, 1993)

== Characters ==
- Armor
- Bucky O'Hare
- Crazyman
- Cyberrad
- Hybrids
- Megalith
- Ms. Mystic
- Samuree
- Shaman
- Silver Streak
- Toyboy
- Valeria, She-Bat
