= Megalith (comics) =

Megalith is a superhero, as well as the title of a comic book starring the hero published by Continuity Comics. Megalith first appeared in "Zero Patrol" as a back up feature in 1984. After that he then appeared in Revengers #1 in 1985, which had him team up with Armour and Silver Streak. Later, Megalith starred in his own series.

== Characterization ==
Joe Majurac was a gifted young student and athlete who aspired to one day become an Olympic champion. When his family farm was threatened with foreclosure, Joe eagerly accepted an offer of sponsorship by an unheard-of German corporation. Unaware of their sinister motives for him, Joe allowed the company to train him at their state-of-the-art facility in Germany. Joe drove himself to become the best at multiple athletic events, unknowingly achieving a "mind/body link" that allowed him to surpass normal human ability. When his trainers continued to push him towards an unseen goal, and contact with his parents became difficult, Joe began to suspect his benefactors and confronted them. Their response was to threaten his parents, thus driving Joe to break out of the compound and return home. Finding his family farm destroyed and his parents missing, Joe became the costumed hero Megalith in order to find them. His search often led him to fight alongside the Revengers, a team of other heroes.

== Abilities ==
Having achieved a "mind/body link", Joe Majurac has strength, speed and stamina well beyond the human norm. Prior to achieving the link, he had trained to the levels of an Olympic athlete and was able to power-lift up to 1,200 lbs. After achieving the link, he has been shown to destroy concrete with his bare hands as well as lift vehicles and even a tank on one occasion. To a lesser degree, the link also provides him with a genius-level intellect and photographic memory, allowing him to quickly learn new languages and memorize facts or information. His body is resistant to damage, almost to the point of being bulletproof, and his metabolism is such that he is practically immune to poisons while also healing somewhat faster than normal.

After meeting an ally who had also achieved the mind/body link (albeit in the opposite fashion), Joe learned that he could also harness limited psychic abilities such as telepathy and telekinesis.

== Publication history ==
- 1st series: 9 issues, 1989-1992
- 2nd series: 8 issues (#0-7), 1993-1994
