= Neal Adams =

American comic book artist (1941–2022)

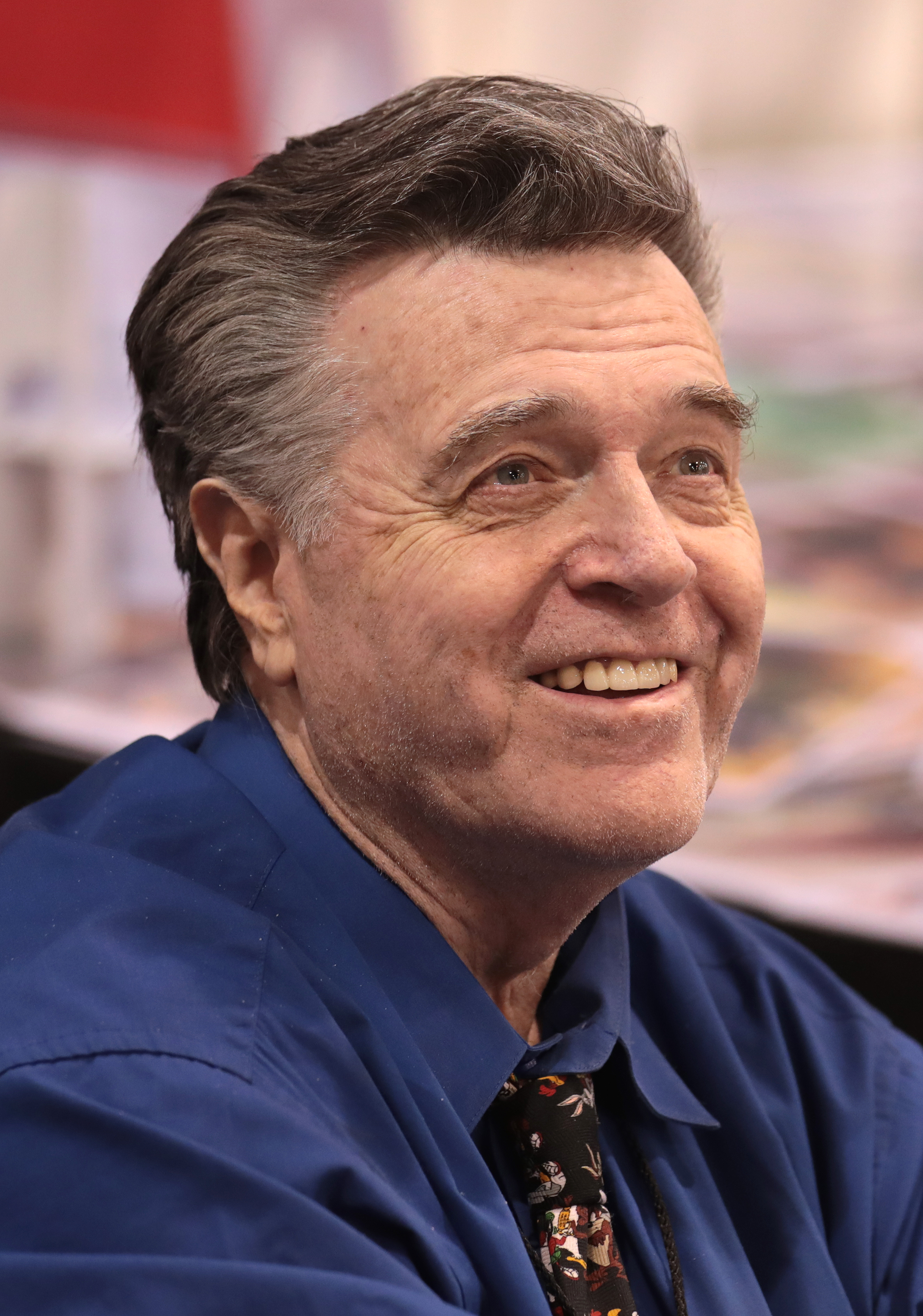
- Adams in 2019
- Born: June 15, 1941 New York City, U.S.
- Died: April 28, 2022 (aged 80) New York City, U.S.
- Areas: Writer, Penciller, Inker, Editor, Publisher
- Notable works: Batman; The Brave and the Bold; Detective Comics; Green Lantern/Green Arrow; Strange Adventures (Deadman); Superman vs. Muhammad Ali; X-Men
- Awards: Alley Awards: Best Cover (1967); Best Full-Length Story (1968, with Bob Haney); Best Pencil Artist (1969); Shazam Awards: Best Individual Story (1970 and 1971, with Dennis O'Neil); Best Pencil Artist (Dramatic Division) (1970); Inkwell Awards: Joe Sinnott Hall of Fame (2019)
- Spouses: Cory Peifer (m. 1963; div. 19??) Marilyn Susser (m. 1977)
- Children: 5, including Kristine, Joel, Jason, Zeea, and Josh Adams

Neal Adams (June 15, 1941 – April 28, 2022) was an American comic book artist. He was the co-founder of the graphic design studio Continuity Associates, and was a creators-rights advocate who helped secure a pension and recognition for Superman creators Jerry Siegel and Joe Shuster. During his career, Adams co-created the characters John Stewart, Man-Bat, and Ra's al Ghul for DC Comics.

After drawing the comic strip based on the television drama Ben Casey in the early 1960s, Adams was hired as a freelancer by DC Comics in 1967. Later that year, he became the artist for the superhero character Deadman in the science fiction comic book Strange Adventures. Adams and writer Dennis O'Neil collaborated on influential runs on Batman and Green Lantern/Green Arrow in the early 1970s. For Batman, the duo returned the Batman character to his gothic roots as a contrast to the Batman television series of the 1960s. During their Green Lantern/Green Arrow run, O'Neil and Adams introduced a mature, realistic tone through stories such as "Snowbirds Don't Fly", in which Green Arrow's ward Roy Harper is revealed to have become addicted to drugs. The duo created and introduced the Green Lantern character John Stewart in 1971.

Following his runs on Batman and Green Lantern, Adams drew other books for DC such as Superman vs. Muhammad Ali in 1978. In addition to his work with DC, Adams simultaneously freelanced for Marvel Comics on books such as Uncanny X-Men and The Avengers. In 1971, Adams established the art and illustration studio Continuity Associates with Dick Giordano. In 1984, Adams founded his own comic book company Continuity Comics, which was in business until 1994.

Adams was inducted into the Eisner Awards' Will Eisner Comic Book Hall of Fame in 1998, the Harvey Awards' Jack Kirby Hall of Fame in 1999, and the Inkwell Awards Joe Sinnott Hall of Fame in 2019.

== Early life ==
Neal Adams was born June 15, 1941, on Governors Island, New York City, to Frank Adams, a writer for the military, and Lilian, who ran a boardinghouse. Raised in a military family, he grew up in a series of army bases, ranging from Brooklyn to Germany. His father was largely absent from his life. Adams attended the School of Industrial Art high school in Manhattan, graduating in 1959.

== Career ==
=== Early work ===
After graduation in 1959, he unsuccessfully attempted to find freelance work at DC Comics, and turned then to Archie Comics, where he wanted to work on the publisher's fledgling superhero line, edited by Joe Simon. At the suggestion of staffers, Adams drew "three or four pages of [the superhero] the Fly", but did not receive encouragement from Simon. Sympathetic staffers nonetheless asked Adams to draw samples for the Archie teen-humor comics themselves. While he did so, Adams said in a 2000s interview, he unknowingly broke into comics:

I started to do samples for Archie and I left my Fly samples there. A couple weeks later when I came in to show my Archie samples, I noticed that the pages were still there, but the bottom panel was cut off of one of my pages. I said, "What happened?" They said, "One of the artists did this transition where Tommy Troy turns into the Fly and it's not very good. You did this real nice piece so we'll use that, if it's OK." I said, "That's great. That's terrific."

That panel ran in Adventures of the Fly #4 (Jan. 1960). Afterward, Adams began writing, penciling, inking, and lettering humorous full-page and half-page gag fillers for Archie's Joke Book Magazine. In a 1976 interview, he recalled earning "[a]bout $16.00 per half-page and $32.00 for a full page. That may not seem like a great deal of money, but at the time it meant a great deal to myself as well as my mothers ... as we were not in a wealthy state. It was manna from heaven, so to speak." A recommendation led him to artist Howard Nostrand, who was beginning the Bat Masterson syndicated newspaper comic strip, and he worked as Nostrand's assistant for three months, primarily drawing backgrounds at what Adams recalled as $9 a week and "a great experience".

Having "not left Archie Comics under the best of circumstances", Adams turned to commercial art for the advertising industry. After a rocky start freelancing, he began landing regular work at the Johnstone and Cushing agency, which specialized in comic-book styled advertising. Helped by artist Elmer Wexler, who critiqued the young Adams' samples, Adams brought his portfolio to the agency, which initially "didn't believe I had done those particular samples since they looked so much like Elmer Wexler's work. But they gave me a chance and ... I stayed there for about a year".

=== Ben Casey ===
Premiere of the Ben Casey strip, November 26, 1962. Art by Adams.

In 1962, Adams began his comics career in earnest at the Newspaper Enterprise Association syndicate. From a recommendation, writer Jerry Caplin, a.k.a. Jerry Capp, brother of Li'l Abner creator Al Capp, invited Adams to draw samples for Capp's proposed Ben Casey comic strip, based on the popular television medical-drama series. On the strength of his samples and of his "Chip Martin, College Reporter" AT&T advertising comic-strip pages in Boys' Life magazine, and of his similar Goodyear Tire ads, Adams landed the assignment. The first daily strip, which carried Adams' signature, appeared November 26, 1962; a color Sunday strip was added September 20, 1964. Adams continued to do Johnston & Cushing assignments during Ben Casey's 3 1/2-year run.

Comics historian Maurice Horn said the strip "did not shrink from tackling controversial problems, such as heroin addiction, illegitimate pregnancy, and attempted suicide. These were usually treated in soap opera fashion ... but there was also a touch of toughness to the proceedings, well rendered by Adams in a forceful, direct style that exuded realism and tension and accorded well with the overall tone of the strip".

In addition to Capp, Jerry Brondfield also wrote for the strip, with Adams stepping in occasionally.

The ABC series, which ran five seasons, ended March 21, 1966, with the final comic strip appearing Sunday, July 31, 1966. Despite the end of the series, Adams has said the strip, which he claimed at different points to have appeared in 365 newspapers, 265 newspapers, and 165 newspapers, ended "for no other reason that it was an unhappy situation":

We ended the strip under mutual agreement. I wasn't happy working on the strip nor was I happy giving up a third of the money to [the TV series' producer,] Bing Crosby Productions. The strip I should have been making twelve hundred [dollars] a week from was making me three hundred to three-fifty a week. On top of that, I was not able to express myself artistically when I wanted to. But we left under very fine conditions. I was even offered a deal in which I would be paid so much a month if I would agree not to do any syndicated strip for anyone else, in order that I might save myself for anything they have for me to do.

Adams' goal at this point was to be a commercial illustrator. While drawing Ben Casey, he had continued to do storyboards and other work for ad agencies, and said in 1976 that after leaving the strip he had shopped around a portfolio for agencies and for men's magazines, "but my material was a little too realistic and not exactly right for most. I left my portfolio in an advertising agency promising they were going to hold on to it. In the meantime I needed to make some money ... and I thought, 'Why don't I do some comics?'" In a 2000s interview, he remembered the events slightly differently, saying "I took [my portfolio] to various advertising people. I left it at one place overnight and when I came back to get it the next morning it was gone. So six months worth of work down the drain. ... "

He worked as a ghost artist for a few weeks in 1966 on the comic strip Peter Scratch (1965–1967), a hardboiled detective serial created by writer Elliot Caplin, brother of Al Capp and Jerry Capp, and artist Lou Fine. Comics historians also credit Adams with ghosting two weeks of dailies for Stan Drake's The Heart of Juliet Jones, but are uncertain on dates; some sources give 1966, another 1968, and Adams himself 1963. As well, Adams drew 18 sample dailies (three weeks' continuity) of a proposed dramatic serial, Tangent, about construction engineer Barnaby Peake, his college-student brother Jeff, and their teenaged sibling Chad, in 1965, but it was not syndicated. Adams later said that Elliot Caplin offered Adams the job of drawing a comic strip based on author Robin Moore's The Green Berets, but that Adams, who opposed the Vietnam War, where the series was set, suggested longtime DC Comics war comics artist Joe Kubert, who landed that assignment.

=== Silver Age splash ===
Strange Adventures #207 (Dec. 1967): One of Adams' earliest DC Comics covers, and his first for his signature character Deadman, already shows a mature style and a design innovation for the time. It won the 1967 Alley Award for Best Cover.

Turning to comic books, Adams found work at Warren Publishing's black-and-white horror-comics magazines, under editor Archie Goodwin. Adams debuted there as penciler and inker of writer Goodwin's eight-page story "Curse of the Vampire" in Creepy #14 (April 1967). He and Goodwin quickly collaborated on two more stories, "Fair Exchange" in Eerie #9 (May 1967) and "The Terror Beyond Time" in Creepy #15 (June 1967), and Adams reapproached DC Comics.

With DC war comics stalwart Joe Kubert now concentrating on the comic strip The Green Berets, Adams, despite his opposition to then-current U.S. military involvement in Vietnam, saw an opening:

I really didn't like most of the comics [at DC] but I did like war comics, ... so I thought, 'You know, now that Joe is not working there, they've got Russ Heath and they are plugging other people in where Joe used to be. Maybe I could kind of shift into a Joe Kubert kind of thing and do some war comics, and kind of bash them out [quickly]'. ... So I went over to see [DC war-comics editor] Bob Kanigher and I showed him my stuff, and I did have that feeling that they were missing Joe – a guy who could draw and do that rough, action stuff. So he gave me some work".

Adams made his DC debut as penciler-inker of the 8 1/2-page story "It's My Turn to Die", written by Howard Liss, in the anthology series Our Army at War #182 (July 1967). He did a smattering of additional horror and war stories, respectively, for the two publishers, and then, after being turned down by DC's Batman editor Julius Schwartz, approached fellow DC editor Murray Boltinoff in the hopes of drawing for Boltinoff's Batman team-up title The Brave and the Bold. Boltinoff instead assigned him to The Adventures of Jerry Lewis #101 (July–August 1967) and its full-length story "Jerry the Astro-Nut", written by Arnold Drake. It became the first of a slew of stories and covers Adams would draw for that series and The Adventures of Bob Hope, two licensed titles starring fictional versions of the TV, film and nightclub comedians.

During this period near the end of the industry revival historians call the Silver Age of comic books, Adams was soon assigned his first superhero covers, illustrating that of the Superman flagship Action Comics #356 (Nov. 1967) and the same month's Superman's Girl Friend, Lois Lane #79 (Nov. 1967), featuring Superman and a mysterious new costumed character, Titanman. Also that month, Adams drew his first superhero story, teaming with writer Gardner Fox on the lighthearted backup feature "The Elongated Man" in Detective Comics #369 (November 1967), the flagship Batman title. Shortly afterward, he drew Batman himself, along with the supernatural superhero the Spectre, on the cover of The Brave and the Bold #75 (Jan. 1968) – the first published instance of Adams' work on what would become two of his signature comics characters. The first instance of Adams drawing Batman in an interior story was "The Superman-Batman Revenge Squads" in World's Finest Comics #175 (May 1968).

Another signature character, in what would prove Adams' breakout series, was the supernatural hero Deadman, who had debuted in DC's Strange Adventures #205 (Nov. 1967). Adams succeeded co-creator artist Carmine Infantino with the following issue's 17-page story "An Eye for an Eye", written by Arnold Drake, with George Roussos inking Adams' pencils. Adams went on to draw both the covers and stories for issues 207–216 (Dec. 1967 – Feb. 1969), and taking over the scripting with #212 (June 1968). The series became a fan sensation, winning many awards and being almost immediately inducted into the Alley Award Hall of Fame, with Adams himself receiving a special award "for the new perspective and dynamic vibrance he has brought to the field of comic art".

Adams concurrently drew covers and stories for The Spectre #2–5 (Feb.-Aug. 1968), also writing the latter two issues, and became DC's primary cover artist well into the 1970s. Adams recalled that Infantino "was appointed art director, and decided I was going to be his spark plug. I also thought it was a good idea, and was promised a number of things which were never fulfilled. But I thought it would be an adventure anyway, so I knuckled down to things like 'Deadman', The Spectre and whatever odd things would come my way. I was also doing large amounts of covers".

Adams was called upon to rewrite and redraw a Teen Titans story which had been written by then-newcomers Len Wein and Marv Wolfman. The story, titled "Titans Fit the Battle of Jericho!", would have introduced DC's first African American superhero but was rejected by publisher Carmine Infantino. The revised story appeared in Teen Titans #20 (March–April 1969).

Adams' art style, honed in advertising and in the photorealistic school of dramatic-serial comics strips, marked a signal change from most comics art to that time. Comics writer and columnist Steven Grant wrote in 2009 that,

Jim Steranko at Marvel and Neal Adams were the most prominent new artists of the late '60s to enter a field that had been relatively hostile to new artists ... and breaths of modernism, referencing advertising art and pop art as much as comics. Despite vastly different styles, both favored designs that drew on depth of focus and angularity that put the reader in the center of the action while slightly disorienting them to increase the tension, and placed special emphasis on lighting and body language as emotion cues. Not that these things were unknown in comics by any stretch, but publishers traditionally deemphasized them. As well, both were hugely influential on how a new generation of artists thought about what comics should look like, though Adams was arguably more influential; his approach was more visceral and, more importantly, he ran a studio in Manhattan [Continuity Associates] where many young artists started their professional careers.

=== First Marvel Comics work ===
X-Men #63 (Dec. 1969). Cover art by Adams and Tom Palmer.

While continuing to freelance for DC, Adams in 1969 also began freelancing for Marvel Comics, where he penciled several issues of the mutant-superhero team title X-Men and one story for a horror anthology title. The Marvel "Bullpen Bulletins" column of Fantastic Four #87 (June 1969) described Adams as having "one foot planted in our Marvel doorway. We're guessing your ecstatic comments, when you see the way he illustrated our latest X-Men bombshell, will transform him into a Marvel madman from head to toe." Such freelancing across the two leading companies was rare at the time; most DC creators who did so worked pseudonymously. Adams recalled in 1976:

The first time I got away from DC was when I went to Marvel to do the X-Men. It didn't stop me from working at DC; they were a little annoyed at me, but that was a calculated plan. ... If people saw that I would do such a thing, then other people might do it. Beyond that, it seemed like working for Marvel might be an interesting thing to do. It was, as matter of fact. I enjoyed working on the X-Men. [The company was] more friendly, a lot more real and I found myself delighting in the company of Herb Trimpe, John Romita and Marie Severin. I found them to be people who were not as oppressed as the people at National [i.e., DC Comics] were.

He teamed with writer Roy Thomas on X-Men, then on the verge of cancellation, starting with issue #56 (May 1969). Adams penciled, colored, and collaborated on plotting, including the entire plot for issue #65. In that issue, his final work on the series, Adams and writer Dennis O'Neil, in one of that creative team's earliest collaborations, revived the Professor X character. While working on the series, Adams was paired for the first time with inker Tom Palmer, with whom he would collaborate on several acclaimed Marvel comics; the duo's work here netted them 1969 Alley Awards for Best Pencil Artist and Best Inking Artist, respectively. Thomas won that year for Best Writer. Though the team failed to save the title, which ended its initial run with #66 (March 1970), the collaboration here and on the "Kree-Skrull War" arc of The Avengers #93–97 (Nov. 1971 – May 1972) produced what comics historians regard as some of Marvel's creative highlights of the era. Adams also wrote and penciled the horror story "One Hungers" in Tower of Shadows #2 (Dec. 1969), and co-wrote with Thomas, but did not draw, another in Chamber of Darkness #2 (Dec. 1969). Thomas and Adams collaborated again along with scripter Gerry Conway and penciler Howard Chaykin to introduce the series "The War of the Worlds" and its central character, Killraven, in Amazing Adventures vol. 2 #18 (May 1973).

=== Batman ===
Continuing to work for DC Comics during this sojourn, while also contributing the occasional story to Warren Publishing's black-and-white horror-comics magazines (including the Don Glut-scripted "Goddess from the Sea" in Vampirella #1, Sept. 1969), Adams had his first collaboration on Batman with writer Dennis O'Neil. The duo, under the direction of editor Julius Schwartz, would help revitalize the character with a series of noteworthy stories reestablishing Batman's dark, brooding nature and taking the books away from the campy look and feel of the 1966–68 ABC TV series. Their first two stories were "The Secret of the Waiting Graves" in Detective Comics #395 (Jan. 1970) and "Paint a Picture of Peril" in issue #397 (March 1970), with a short Batman backup story, written by Mike Friedrich, coming in-between, in Batman #219 (Feb. 1970). Adams introduced new characters to the Batman mythos beginning with Man-Bat co-created with writer Frank Robbins in Detective Comics #400 (June 1970). O'Neil and Adams' creation Ra's al Ghul was introduced in the story "Daughter of the Demon" in Batman #232 (June 1971) and the character would later become one of Batman's most common adversaries. The same creative team would revive Two-Face in Batman #234 (Aug. 1971) and revitalize the Joker in "The Joker's Five-Way Revenge!" in Batman #251 (Sept. 1973), a landmark story bringing the character back to his roots as a homicidal maniac who murders people on a whim and delights in his mayhem.

=== Green Lantern/Green Arrow and "relevant comics" ===
Green Lantern/Green Arrow #76 (April 1970). Cover art by Adams.

Batman's enduring makeover was published around the same time as Adams and O'Neil's revamping of the longstanding DC characters Green Lantern and Green Arrow.

Rechristening Green Lantern vol. 2 as Green Lantern/Green Arrow with issue #76 (April 1970), O'Neil and Adams teamed these two very different superheroes in a long story arc in which the characters undertook a social-commentary journey across America. A few months earlier, Adams updated Green Arrow's visual appearance by designing a new costume and giving him a distinctive goatee beard for the character in The Brave and the Bold #85 (Aug.-Sept 1969). A major exemplar of what the industry and the public at the time called "relevant comics", the landmark run began with the 23-page story "No Evil Shall Escape My Sight" and continued to "... And through Him Save a World" in the series' finale, #89 (May 1972). It was during this period that one of the best known O'Neil/Adams stories appeared, in Green Lantern #85–86, when it was revealed that Green Arrow's ward Speedy was addicted to heroin. Wrote historian Ron Goulart,

These angry issues deal with racism, overpopulation, pollution, and drug addiction. The drug abuse problem was dramatized in an unusual and unprecedented way by showing Green Arrow's heretofore clean-cut boy companion Speedy turning into a heroin addict. All this endeared DC to the dedicated college readers of the period and won awards for both artist and writer. Sales, however, weren't especially influenced by the praise, and by 1973 the crusading had ceased. I remember dropping in on [editor] Julius Schwartz about this time and asking him how relevance was doing. 'Relevance is dead', he informed me, not too cheerfully.

After Green Lantern was cancelled, the adventures of both super-heroes continued in the pages of The Flash #217–219 and #226 (1972–74).

=== Other work for DC ===
After Green Lantern/Green Arrow, Adams' contributions to DC, apart from his work on Batman, were sporadic, limiting to draw a Clark Kent back-up story in Superman #254 (1972) and sharing credits with Jim Aparo pencilling the Teen Titans in The Brave and the Bold #102 (1972). Adams also drew a few stories for Weird Western Tales and House of Mystery and covers for Action Comics and Justice League of America as well. Adams worked on the first intercompany superhero crossover Superman vs. the Amazing Spider-Man. Several of the Superman figures were redrawn by him.

The last complete story that Adams drew at DC before opening his own company, Continuity Associates, was the oversize Superman vs. Muhammad Ali (1978) which Adams has called a personal favorite. After this, Adams' production for DC and Marvel was mainly limited to new covers for reprint editions of some of his work, such as Green Lantern/Green Arrow, The Avengers: The Kree-Skrull War, X-Men: Visionaries, Deadman Collection and The Saga of Ra's al Ghul, which were variously published as reprint miniseries or trade paperback collections. In 1988, he designed a new costume for DC's Robin character Dick Grayson. DC loved the redesign and adopted it to the comics years later when they introduced new Robin Tim Drake. A miniposter was included in the first issue of the Robin limited series.

=== 21st century ===
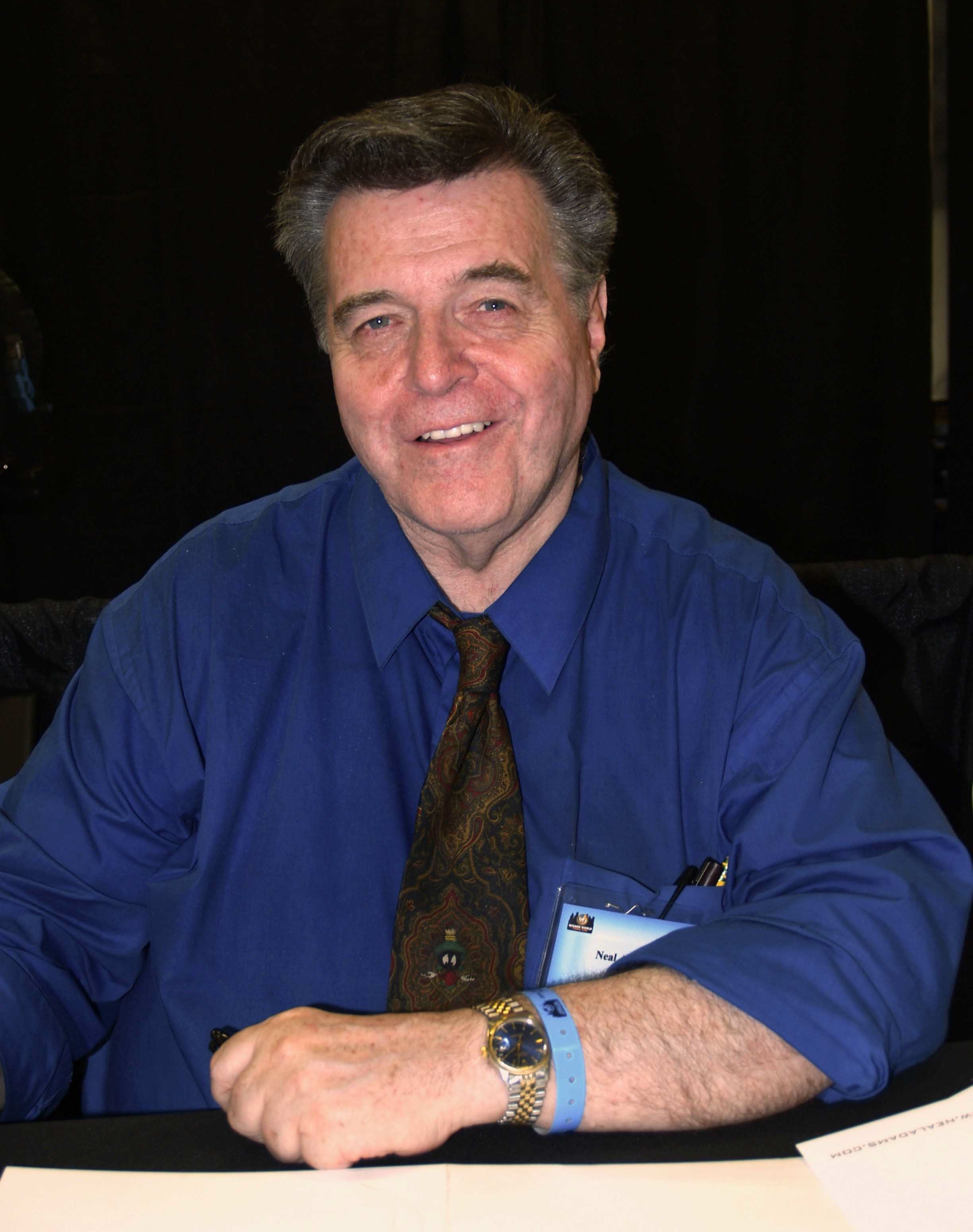
Adams at the 2013 Wizard World New York Experience

In 2005 Adams returned to Marvel (his last collaboration for this publisher had been in 1981 drawing a story for the Bizarre Adventures magazine) to draw an eight-page story for the Giant-Size X-Men #3. The following year Adams (among other artists) provided art to Young Avengers Special #1.

In 2010, Adams returned to DC Comics as writer and artist on the miniseries Batman: Odyssey. Originally conceived as a 12-issue story, the series ran for six issues, being relaunched with vol. 2, #1 in October 2011. A total of seven issues were published for the second series until its end in June 2012.

Apart from those assignments for DC, Adams penciled New Avengers vol. 2, #16.1 (Nov. 2011) for Marvel Comics. In May 2012, Marvel announced that Adams would work on the X-Men again with The First X-Men, a five-issue miniseries drawn and plotted by him and written by Christos Gage. Adams produced short stories for Batman Black and White vol. 2 #1 (Nov. 2013) and Detective Comics vol. 2 #27 (March 2014).

In February 2016, Adams revisited some of his most notable covers done for DC Comics in the 1960s and 1970s, replacing the original characters with some of the New 52 ones. Later that same year, Adams wrote and drew the six-part Superman: Coming of the Supermen miniseries. In 2017, Adams wrote and drew a Deadman limited series. He drew a new five-page story titled "The Game", which was written by Paul Levitz, for the Action Comics: 80 Years of Superman hardcover collection.

In August 2020, Adams and writer Mark Waid released Fantastic Four: Antithesis, a four issue miniseries starring the Fantastic Four in a battle with a new cosmic threat. This would be his final work as an interior artist. Adams' final work as a writer (in addition to providing the artwork) would be Batman vs Ra's al Ghul, a miniseries that was originally published in November 2019 before the final two issues were delayed to March 2021 due to the COVID-19 pandemic.

== Film, TV and theater ==
Adams' pencil drawings on his later Batman stories were frequently inked by Dick Giordano, with whom Adams formed Continuity Associates, a company that supplied storyboards for motion pictures and interior artwork for comics publishers.

In the early 1970s, Adams was the art director, costume designer, as well as the poster/playbill illustrator for Warp!, a science fiction stage play by director Stuart Gordon and playwright Lenny Kleinfeld under the pseudonym Bury St. Edmund.

In 1980, Neal Adams directed and starred in Nannaz, later released by Troma under the title Death to the Pee Wee Squad. The film co-starred Adams' children Jason and Zeea as well as fellow comics professionals Denys Cowan, Ralph Reese, Larry Hama, and Gray Morrow.

In late 2013 Adams appeared in the PBS TV documentary Superheroes: A Never-Ending Battle.

== Creators' rights ==
During the 1970s, Adams was politically active in the industry, and attempted to unionize its creative community. His efforts, along with precedents set by Atlas/Seaboard Comics' creator-friendly policies and other factors, helped lead to the modern industry's standard practice of returning original artwork to the artist, who can earn additional income from art sales to collectors. He won his battle in 1987, when Marvel returned original artwork to him and industry legend Jack Kirby, among others. Adams helped lead lobbying efforts that resulted in Superman creators Jerry Siegel and Joe Shuster receiving decades-overdue credit and financial remuneration.

Inker Bob McLeod recalled in the 2000s the unique place Adams held in the industry when McLeod entered the comics industry in 1973:

Pat [Broderick] told me I really ought to meet Neal Adams, whom he had met at DC. ... At that time, Neal held a position of respect in the industry that no one in comics since then has achieved. He was the single most respected artist in the business. ... Neal looked at one of my samples and asked me what kind of work I was looking for. I said, "Anything that pays." (By that time, I was down to my last $10. ... ) He just picked up the phone and called the production manager at Marvel and said, "I've got a guy here who has some potential as, well, some potential as an artist, but I think he has a lot of potential as a letterer." I was immediately hired at Marvel in the production department on Neal's recommendation, and they still didn't even want to see my portfolio. If I was good enough for Neal, I was good enough for them.

In 1978, Adams helped form the Comics Creators Guild, which over three dozen comic-book writers and artists joined.

Also during the 1970s, Adams illustrated paperback novels in the Tarzan series for Ballantine Books. With the independent-comic publishing boom of the early 1980s, he began working for Pacific Comics (where he produced the poorly received Skateman) and other publishers, and founded his own Continuity Comics as an offshoot of Continuity Associates. His comic-book company's characters include Megalith, Bucky O'Hare, Skeleton Warriors, CyberRad, and Ms. Mystic. He and fellow artist Michael Netzer entered into a dispute over intellectual property rights to Ms. Mystic, a character they had worked on jointly in 1977, which Adams had published under the Pacific Comics and Continuity Comics imprints, leading to a lawsuit against Adams in United States District Court in 1993. The case was dismissed in 1997, citing the statute of limitations.

== Dina Babbitt and work related to the Holocaust ==
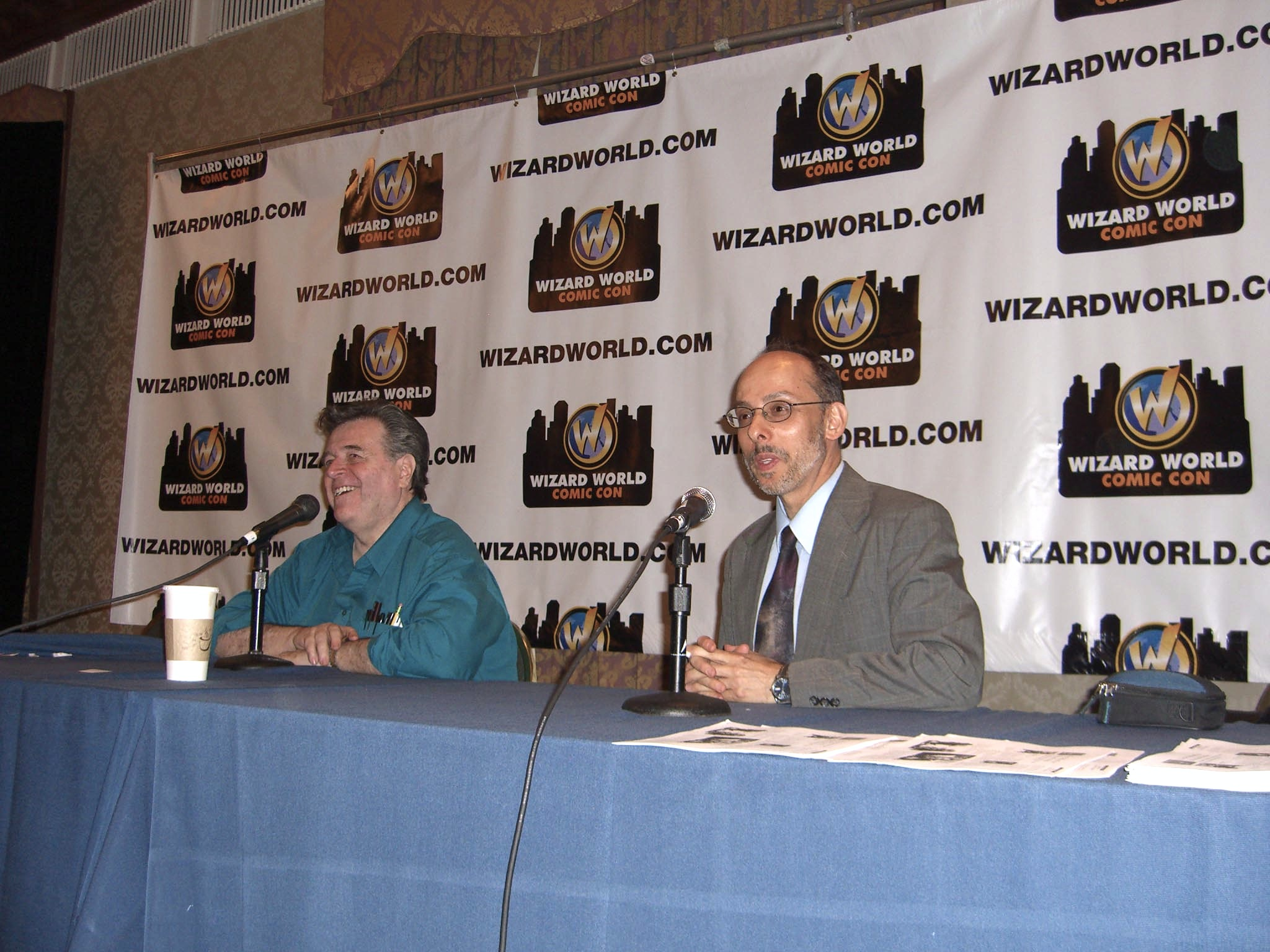
Adams and Rafael Medoff promoting They Spoke Out: American Voices Against the Holocaust at the Big Apple Convention, May 21, 2011

In collaboration with Rafael Medoff, director of the David S. Wyman Institute for Holocaust Studies, Adams championed an effort to get the Auschwitz-Birkenau State Museum, which is operated by the government of Poland, to return the original artwork of Dina Babbitt. In exchange for his sparing her mother and herself from the gas chambers, Babbitt worked as an illustrator for Nazi death camp doctor Josef Mengele, who wanted detailed paintings to demonstrate his pseudoscientific theories about Romani racial inferiority. Using text from Medoff, Adams illustrated a six-page graphic documentary about Babbitt that was inked by Joe Kubert and contains an introduction by Stan Lee. However, Adams deemphasized any comparison between the Babbitt case and his struggle for creator rights, saying that her situation was "tragic" and "an atrocity."

In 2010, Adams and Medoff teamed with Disney Educational Productions to produce They Spoke Out: American Voices Against the Holocaust, an online educational motion comics series that tells stories of Americans who protested Nazis or helped rescue Jews during the Holocaust. Each standalone episode, which runs from five to ten minutes, utilizes a combination of archival film footage and animatics drawn by Adams (who also narrates), and focus on a different person. The first episode, "La Guardia's War Against Hitler" was screened in April 2010 at a festival sponsored by the Museum of Comic and Cartoon Art, and tells the story of the forceful stand New York City Mayor Fiorello La Guardia took against Nazi Germany. La Guardia's actions stood in contrast to the relative passivity of President Franklin Roosevelt, who historians such as David S. Wyman believe did not do as much as he could have to save European Jews, a point underlined in the episode "Messenger from Hell". Other episodes include "Voyage of the Doomed", which focuses on the S.S. St. Louis, the ship that carried more than 900 German-Jewish refugees but was turned away by Cuban authorities and later the Roosevelt administration, and "Rescue Over the Mountains", which depicts Varian Fry, the young journalist who led an underground rescue network that smuggled Jewish refugees out of Vichy France.

== Awards and honors ==
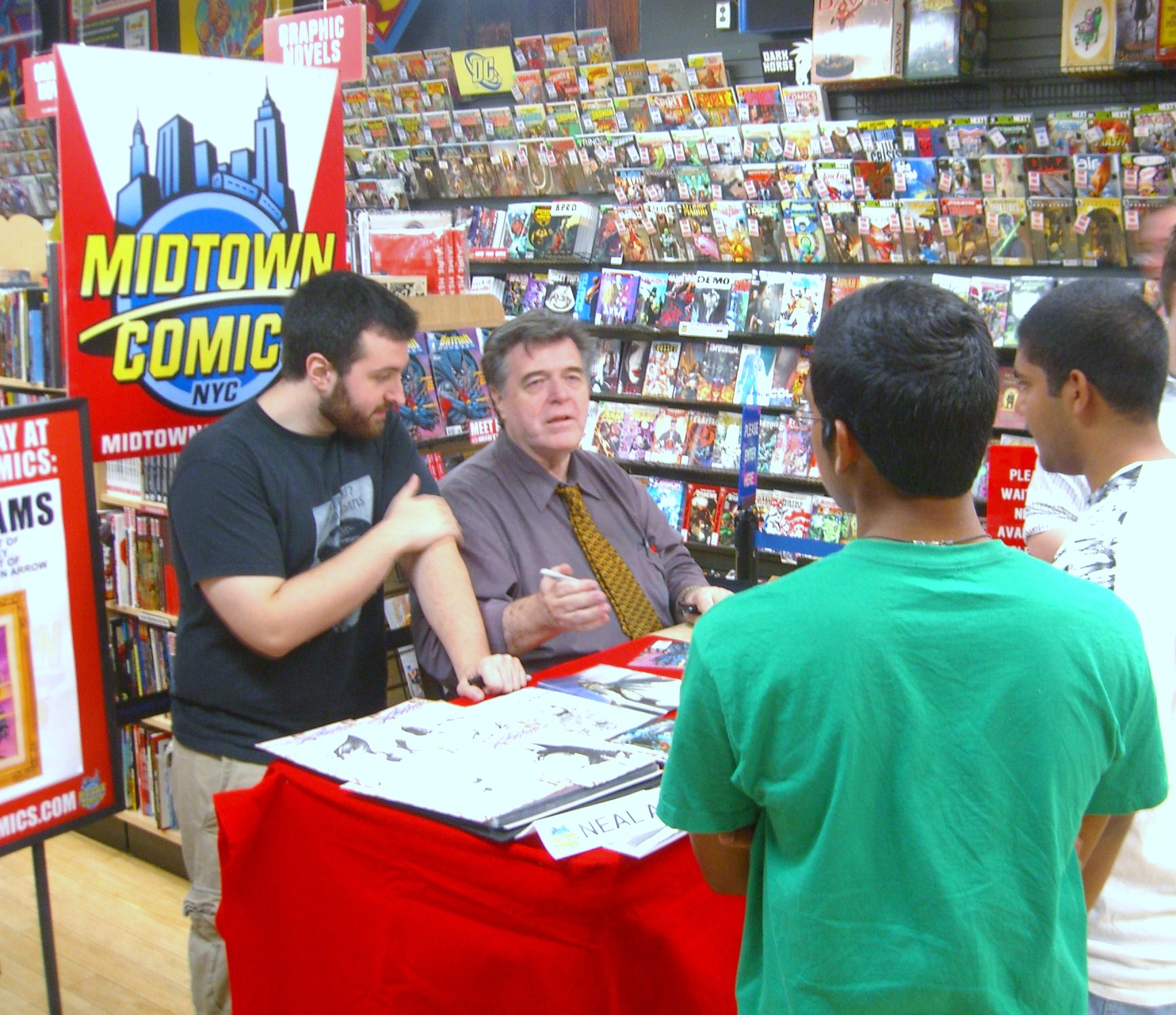
Adams with his son Josh at a signing for Batman: Odyssey #1 at Midtown Comics Times Square, July 10, 2010

Adams' first Deadman cover won the 1967 Alley Award for Best Cover. A Batman/Deadman team-up in The Brave and the Bold #79 (Sept. 1968), by Adams and writer Bob Haney, tied with another comic for the 1968 Alley Award for Best Full-Length Story; and in 1969, Adams won the Alley Award for Best Pencil Artist, the feature "Deadman" was elected to the Alley Award Hall of Fame, and Adams received a special award "for the new perspective and dynamic vibrance he has brought to the field of comic art".

He also won Shazam Awards in 1970 for Best Individual Story ("No Evil Shall Escape My Sight" in Green Lantern vol. 2, #76, with writer Dennis O'Neil), and Best Pencil Artist (Dramatic Division); and in 1971 for Best Individual Story ("Snowbirds Don't Fly" in Green Lantern vol. 2, #85, with O'Neil).

Adams won the 1971 Goethe Award for Favorite Pro Artist, as well as the 1971 Goethe Award for Favorite Comic-Book Story for "No Evil Shall Escape My Sight" (written by Denny O'Neil) in Green Lantern/Green Arrow #76.

He won an Inkpot Award in 1976 and was voted the "Favourite Comicbook Artist" at the 1977 and the 1978 Eagle Awards.

In 1985, DC Comics named Adams as one of the honorees in the company's 50th anniversary publication Fifty Who Made DC Great.

Adams was inducted into the Eisner Awards' Will Eisner Comic Book Hall of Fame in 1998, and the Harvey Awards' Jack Kirby Hall of Fame in 1999.

In 2019, Adams was inducted into the Inkwell Awards Joe Sinnott Hall of Fame for his lifetime achievement and outstanding accomplishments.

== Advocacy of expanding Earth hypothesis ==
Adams believed the Earth is growing through a process called pair production. Adams held the work of Australian geologist Samuel Warren Carey in high esteem, but considered the term "Expanding Earth" a misnomer. While Carey did advocate an expanding Earth in the mid-20th century, his model was rejected following the development of the theory of plate tectonics. Adams advocated his ideas in a DVD documentary he wrote and produced, clips of which are available on his YouTube channel. Planet growth animations were created by Neal's daughter Zeea Adams.

Adams appeared on the radio show Coast to Coast AM several times to discuss his claims. He was also interviewed by Steven Novella on a Skeptics Guide podcast in 2006, and afterward continued the debate on Novella's blog. Japan Times columnist Jeff Ogrisseg wrote a three-part feature promoting Adams's ideas, which was roundly criticized by Novella for being an example of "outright promotion of pseudoscience as if it were news." Adams also used the concept as the basis for his Batman: Odyssey series, in which the planet's expansion has produced a Hollow Earth, the inside of which is inhabited by dinosaurs and Neanderthal versions of the main characters.

== Personal life and death ==
Adams' first wife was comics colorist Cory Adams. Their children are Kristine (Neal's business right hand), Joel (artist and character designer on King of the Hill), Jason (works in toy and fantasy sculpture), and Zeea (colorist, painter, digital artist and animator).

Adams and his second wife Marilyn lived in New York. Together they had one son, Josh. Josh illustrated a pinup of Batman in Batman: Odyssey #1 (Sept. 2010).

Adams died in New York on April 28, 2022, at the age of 80. Marilyn, his wife of 45 years, told The Hollywood Reporter that Adams had died from complications of sepsis.

The 2023 video game Justice League: Cosmic Chaos was dedicated to his memory along with Gilbert Gottfried, Tim Sale, Alan Grant, George Pérez, and Kevin Conroy, all of whom also died in the same year.

== See also ==
- Crusty Bunkers

Preceded by Carmine Infantino	Strange Adventures artist 1967–1969	Succeeded by n/a
Preceded by Bob Brown	The Brave and the Bold artist 1968–1970	Succeeded by Nick Cardy
Preceded by Werner Roth	The X-Men artist 1969–1970	Succeeded by Sal Buscema
Preceded by Bob Brown	Detective Comics artist 1970–1971	Succeeded by Bob Brown
Preceded by Irv Novick	Batman artist 1970–1974	Succeeded by Irv Novick
Preceded by Gil Kane	Green Lantern/Green Arrow artist 1970–1972	Succeeded by Mike Grell (in 1976)
Preceded by Sal Buscema	The Avengers artist 1971–1972	Succeeded by John Buscema
