= Weisfeld =

Weisfeld is a surname. Notable people with the surname include:

- Gerald Weisfeld (1940–2020), British businessman, founder of What Every Woman Wants
- Horatio Weisfeld, American writer, magazine editor, and publisher
- Irwin Weisfeld (1932–1968), American writer and bookseller

== See also ==
- Weinfeld
