= Eclipso: The Darkness Within =

1992 DC Comics crossover storyline

- Cover of Eclipso: The Darkness Within #1 (July 1992), art by Bart Sears
- Publisher: DC Comics
- Publication date: July – October 1992
- Genre: Superhero; Crossover
Title(s)
Eclipso: The Darkness Within #1-2
Action Comics Annual #4
Adventures of Superman Annual #4
Batman Annual #16
Deathstroke, the Terminator Annual #1
Demon Annual #1
Detective Comics Annual #5
Flash Annual #5
Green Arrow Annual #5
Green Lantern Annual vol. 2, #1
Hawkworld Annual #3
Justice League America Annual #6
Justice League Europe Annual #3
L.E.G.I.O.N. '92 Annual #3
The New Titans Annual #8
Robin Annual #1
Superman Annual vol. 2 #4
Superman: The Man of Steel Annual #1
Wonder Woman Annual #3
Starman #42-45
Valor #1
Eclipso #1-18, Annual #1
- Main character: Eclipso

Creative team
- Writer(s): Robert Loren Fleming; Keith Giffen
- Penciller(s): Bart Sears; Keith Giffen
- Inker(s): Randy Elliot; Mark Pennigton; Raymond Kryssing
- Colorist: Tom McCraw

Eclipso: The Darkness Within is a 1992 comic book miniseries and crossover storyline published by DC Comics. It featured the heroes of the DC Universe fighting against Eclipso. Issue #1 debuted July 1992, and was created and co-plotted by Robert Loren Fleming and Keith Giffen. Keith Giffen also did pencil layouts for the series, and Bart Sears provided the finished artwork.

== History ==
Within this series it was retconned that Eclipso was not simply Bruce Gordon's dark half, but a vengeance demon who had possessed Gordon.

== Plot ==
After an unsuspecting Daxamite hero named Valor frees Eclipso from his palace on Earth's moon, he uses hate as a trigger to possess other beings. Whenever someone who has a black diamond in their possession gets angry, Eclipso can instantly take control of that particular person, even while trapped in his lair on the moon. He then uses an eye blast to take control of others. He can also create monsters from a person's anger, which happens with characters like Hawkman and James Gordon. Furthermore, there are one thousand black diamonds scattered around the world, through which Eclipso can possess his victims by playing upon their darkest emotions and desires.

It is further established that Eclipso is an extremely cruel and vindictive being, who has only been pretending to be a B-list villain in order to avoid detection by the heroes. In the miniseries, Eclipso has grown weary of his modus operandi and decides to launch an all-out offensive by using his black diamonds to possess the heroes and villains directly, or to manipulate them by possessing their loved ones. During this conflict, Eclipso possesses Batman, Captain Marvel and even Superman on two separate occasions. The story climaxes with a massive confrontation at Eclipso's hideout on the moon, where, despite the presence of many superpowered heroes and heroines, Bruce Gordon, Eclipso's original host, plays a key role in his defeat.

It was also mocked in the Ambush Bug Nothing Special one-shot.

=== Crossover titles ===
- Part 1: Eclipso: The Darkness Within #1
- Part 2: Superman: The Man of Steel Annual #1
- Part 3: Green Lantern Annual (vol. 3) #1
- Part 4: Detective Comics Annual #5
- Part 5: Superman Annual (vol. 2) #4
- Part 6: Justice League America Annual #6
- Part 7: Demon Annual (vol. 3) #1
- Part 8: Flash Annual (vol. 2) #5
- Part 9: Action Comics Annual #4
- Part 10: Wonder Woman Annual (vol. 2) #3
- Part 11: Green Arrow Annual (vol. 2) #5
- Part 12: Robin Annual (vol. 4) #1
- Part 13: Hawkworld Annual (vol. 2) #3
- Part 14: Deathstroke, the Terminator Annual #1
- Part 15: The New Titans Annual #8
- Part 16: Justice League Europe Annual #3
- Part 17: Batman Annual #16
- Part 18: L.E.G.I.O.N. '92 Annual #3
- Part 19: Adventures of Superman Annual #4
- Part 20: Eclipso: The Darkness Within #2
- Aftermath: Valor #1
- Eclipso #1-18 and Annual #1
