= George Caragonne =

American comic book writer (1965–1995)

- Born: September 16, 1965 San Antonio, Texas, U.S.
- Died: July 20, 1995 (aged 29) New York City, U.S.
- Areas: Writer, Editor
- Notable works: Penthouse Comix

George Caragonne (September 16, 1965 – July 20, 1995) was an American comic book writer and editor, most notable for being co-founder of Penthouse Comix magazine.

He died on July 20, 1995. The cause of death was suicide.

== Early life ==
George Caragonne was born in San Antonio, Texas, the only male child born to Alexander Caragonne (author/architect) and Alice Caragonne. He has a sibling and a niece named Alice Caragonne, who was born February 4, 1994.

== Career ==
George Caragonne's career in comics began when he sent an unsolicited submission to Marvel Comics in 1984. He eventually trained under the guidance of Editor-in-Chief Jim Shooter.

Caragonne wrote primarily for Marvel Comics and their subsidiary Star Comics, throughout the latter half of the 1980s. Titles he wrote included Masters of the Universe, Planet Terry, and Star Brand. He also worked in the animation field.

In 1988, after hearing that former Marvel editor-in-chief Jim Shooter was forming Valiant Comics, Caragonne drove from California to New York, and, unannounced, knocked on Shooter's door to offer his services. Caragonne agreed to do work for Valiant, all while holding a full-time job. After Valiant was established, Caragonne wrote such titles as Captain N, The Legend of Zelda, and Punch-Out!!.

After leaving Valiant, Caragonne wrote a few freelance stories for Marvel, including a short Silver Surfer story for a custom comic produced for Charleston Chew, and a short backup tale for a Fantastic Four Annual #25 (1992).

Around this time Caragonne created a comics packaging studio called Constant Developments, Inc. (CDI). CDI optioned the rights to produce new comics featuring the 1960s superhero team T.H.U.N.D.E.R. Agents (from John Carbonaro, then the rights-holder). An acquaintance introduced Caragonne to Penthouse magazine publisher Bob Guccione, whom Caragonne tried to interest in publishing T.H.U.N.D.E.R. Agents. Guccione instead hired Caragonne to create soft-core erotica comic sections for Penthouse magazine.

Caragonne was given an office inside Penthouse's headquarters. After several sections of comics had been produced for Penthouse, Guccione directed Caragonne to produce a stand-alone comics magazine for his company; the first issue of Penthouse Comix appeared in early 1994. With stories by Caragonne and illustrations by artists that included Adam Hughes, Garry Leach, Arthur Suydam, Milo Manara, Richard Corben, Bart Sears, and Gray Morrow, Penthouse Comix was an immediate international success, and spawned a full line that included the seven-issue Men's Adventure Comix and the three-issue Omni Comix, the latter a companion to the science magazine Omni, which was also published by Guccione. (A T.H.U.N.D.E.R. Agents story did eventually find publication in a Guccione publication, in the first issue of Omni Comix.)

According to comics writer and columnist Mark Evanier, the success of his books with Penthouse led to excess on Caragonne's part, in particular drugs. He became a heavy cocaine user, and also began spending on extravagant items for himself and friends. He also went significantly overbudget on his magazines and on some other, non-Penthouse projects. His working patterns changed to the point where he was working all night in the Penthouse offices, before going home in the day, which concerned his close friends, who tried to intervene with him. According to Evanier, his employers also came to suspect Caragonne of financial "improprieties", and on the night of Friday, July 14, 1995, he discovered that he had been locked out of his office pending a full audit on his books.

== Death ==
After Penthouse locked Caragonne out of his offices on July 14, 1995, writer Mark Evanier says a number of friends in Caragonne's circle spent the following two nights unsuccessfully pleading with him by phone to get professional treatment. Caragonne's movements after this are not accounted for until Thursday, July 20, when he jumped from a 45th floor balcony in an atrium at a hotel in Times Square. Although no one else was killed, many of the witnesses, including some children, suffered emotional trauma and required years of treatment as a result of the event.

== Screenwriting ==
- G.I. Joe: A Real American Hero (1990)
