= Robert Loren Fleming =

American comic book writer

- Born: November 5, 1956 (age 70) United States
- Area: Writer
- Notable works: Ambush Bug; Eclipso; Eclipso: The Darkness Within; Thriller

Robert Loren Fleming (born November 5, 1956) is an American comic book writer. He is best known as the co-creator of Thriller with Trevor Von Eeden and for his collaborations with Keith Giffen.

== Career ==
Robert Loren Fleming worked for DC Comics initially as a proofreader and later as a writer. His first published comics story was "String-Out" in House of Mystery #316 (May 1983). He and artist Trevor Von Eeden created Thriller in 1983. Fleming left the series as of its seventh issue due to difficulties with DC Comics' management.

He frequently worked with Keith Giffen. They produced two Ambush Bug limited series in 1985 and 1986 and an Aquaman one-shot special and a limited series in 1989. In 1991, Fleming and Giffen collaborated with Pat Broderick on a Ragman limited series. The following year, the Fleming/Giffen team produced the Eclipso: The Darkness Within miniseries with artist Bart Sears. The duo reunited for 2008's Ambush Bug: Year None.

Fleming has worked in the animation field as well. He wrote for The Real Ghostbusters series produced by DIC Entertainment in 1986.

== Bibliography ==
- "String-Out" (with Trevor Von Eeden, in House of Mystery #316, DC Comics, May 1983)
- Thriller #1–7 (with Trevor Von Eeden, DC Comics, November 1983 – June 1984)
- Action Comics #560, 563, 565, 577 (with co-author and penciller Keith Giffen and inker Bob Oksner); #580 (with artist Kurt Schaffenberger) (DC Comics, October 1984, January 1985, March 1985, March 1986, June 1986)
- "Flash Force 2000" an advertising promotion for a Matchbox toyline inserted into various DC Comics (with Denys Cowan and Sal Trapani, DC Comics, November 1984)
- DC Comics Presents #81 (with co-author and penciller Keith Giffen and inker Bob Oksner, DC Comics, May 1985)
- Ambush Bug #1–4 (with co-author and penciller Keith Giffen and inker Bob Oksner, mini-series, DC Comics, June – September 1985)
- DC Science Fiction Graphic Novel #1 (comics adaptation of "Hell on Earth" by Robert Bloch; with penciller Keith Giffen and inkers Greg Theakston and Bill Wray, DC Comics, 1985)
- Amethyst vol. 2 #13–14 (with co-author Keith Giffen, penciller Ernie Colón, and inkers Karl Kesel and Bob Smith, DC Comics, February – April 1986)
- Son of Ambush Bug #1–6 (with co-author and penciller Keith Giffen and inker Bob Oksner, limited series, DC Comics, July – December 1986)
- Underworld #1–4 (with artist Ernie Colón, mini-series, DC Comics, December 1987 – March 1988)
- Secret Origins vol. 3
  - #27 (Zatanna story with co-author Roy Thomas, penciller Tom Artis and inker P. Craig Russell, DC Comics, June 1988)
  - #35 (Maxwell Lord story with co-author Keith Giffen and artist Eduardo Barreto, DC Comics, 1988)
  - #47 (Chemical King story with penciller Chris Sprouse and inker Al Gordon, DC Comics, February 1990)
  - #48 (Ambush Bug story with co-author and penciller Keith Giffen and inker Robert Lewis, DC Comics, April 1990)
  - Annual #2 (The Flash story with penciller Carmine Infantino and inker Murphy Anderson, DC Comics, 1988)
- Aquaman #1–5 (with co-author Keith Giffen, pencils by Curt Swan and inker Al Vey, limited series, DC Comics, June – October 1989)
- Archie: To Riverdale and Back Again #1 (with pencillers Gene Colan and Stan Goldberg and inker Mike Esposito, Archie Comics, 1990)
- Ragman #1–8 (with co-author and penciller Keith Giffen and inker Pat Broderick, limited series, DC Comics, October 1991 – May 1992)
- Eclipso: The Darkness Within #1–2 (with co-author Keith Giffen, pencils by Bart Sears and inkers Randy Elliott and Mark Pennington, mini-series, DC Comics, July – October 1992)
- Superman: The Man of Steel Annual #1 (with co-author Roger Stern, penciler Chris Wozniak, and inker Brad Vancata, DC Comics, 1992)
- The Adventures of Superman Annual #4 (with artist Bob McLeod, DC Comics, 1992)
- Eclipso #1–18 (with co-author and penciller Keith Giffen and various artists, DC Comics, November 1992 – April 1994)
- The Big Book of Urban Legends: Adapted from the Works of Jan Harold (with co-authors Robert F. Boyd and Jan Harold Brunvand, 1994)
- Valor #1–8, 10 (with artist M. D. Bright, DC Comics, November 1992 – June 1993, August 1993)
- Cyberpunx (with co-plotter Rob Liefeld, penciller Ching Lau, and inker Lary Stucker, Image Comics, March 1996)
- "Too Smart to Date" (in Marvel Romance Redux: Restraining Orders Are for Other Girls #1, one-shot, Marvel Comics, June 2006)
- "Tall Tale" (with co-author and penciller Keith Giffen and inker Mike Allred, in Marvel Westerns: The Two-Gun Kid, one-shot, Marvel Comics, August 2006)
- Ambush Bug: Year None #1–5, 7 (with co-author Keith Giffen, DC Comics, September 2008 – January 2009, December 2009)

| Preceded by n/a | Thriller writer 1983–1984 | Succeeded by Bill DuBay |
| Preceded by n/a | Valor writer 1992–1993 | Succeeded by Mark Waid |
