= Joe In The Future =

Ongoing short story comic strip

"Joe in the Future"
- Panel from the second JOE IN THE FUTURE story in Heavy Metal Magazine. Art by Trevor Von Eeden.
- Date: 2003
- Appearances: From Heavy Metal Magazine

Joe In The Future is an ongoing short story comic strip that appears in Heavy Metal Magazine. The strip is co-written by Horatio Weisfeld and Peter Koch. The first installment of the series appeared in the January 2002 issue of Heavy Metal Magazine. The most recent appeared in the September 2010 issue. Heavy Metal began running Joe In The Future as a print series in 2001 after the initial episode appeared as 3-minute internet flash web animation and Heavy Metal editor Howard Jorofsky suggested Weisfeld allow the magazine to run additional episodes as print stories. Weisfeld then followed with several additional Joe in the Future installments for Heavy Metal. The nearly simultaneous appearance of Joe in the Future as both web-animation and print episodes makes the series an early example of web-initiated Transmedia storytelling.

In the series, Joe, spends most of his time seeking out cigarettes (which are hard to acquire in the future) and often comes into difficulty with a variety of humans, robots, mutants, etc., who seek to disrupt Joe's cigarette centric agenda to suit their own needs. Joe In The Future is narrated in a terse crime novel style but the stories tend to evolve from commonplace incident rather than good/bad guy type genre conventions. Joe is a tough rogue and yarns tend to feature Goodfellas-type petty street tension that boils to violent climax, but through it all the title character tends to eschew anger, malevolence and disrespect. In this regard, the strip is unusual for action & crime material.

The first Joe in the Future story was developed by writers Horatio Weisfeld and Peter Koch as a short comic book story after Weisfeld, during the late 1980s, was served a cockroach in his food at a Chinese restaurant and imagined the same event playing out in a futuristic setting. That scenario was eventually appropriated by artist Arthur Suydam, a mutual friend of both Weisfeld and Koch, for an episode of Suydam's Cholly and Flytrap series in Marvel Comics' Epic Illustrated. After this, Weisfeld continued to develop more Joe in the Future material with Koch and, in the early 1990s, commissioned 3 pages of comic artwork from acclaimed Batman illustrator Trevor Von Eeden for what would become artwork featured in both first episode of Joe in the Future in Heavy Metal Magazine and a 3-minute animation that was made from scans of the comic page panels. Weisfeld then submitted the story to both Heavy Metal Magazine and Tundra publishing but it was rejected, and it would be 10 years before Joe in the Future was finally printed in Heavy Metal, after Weisfeld, having had success developing Penthouse Comix, and had become acquainted with Heavy Metal editor Howard Jurofsky. It was eventually printed in the Jan 2002 issue. The second Joe in the Future story then appeared in Heavy Metal during the following year.

The plot line of Joe in the Future: The 4th Dimension (Heavy Metal Volume 27 Issue # 5 / 2003) involves phantasmagoric nano-virus introduced by skin contact with marketing flyer handed to unsuspecting passerby on city street corner.

The January 2007 Heavy Metal Magazine included Joe in the Future story (The Reminder Droid) involving corporate armored lawbots that track and seize property from humans and one another. The scenario culminates in an extended legal discourse between two lawbots that devolves into violence; an early visual representation of conflict between lawbots in common law, corporate law and day to day human existence.

2012 Inkpot Award winner Trevor Von Eeden has illustrated several Joe in the Future stories. Other artists have included George Freeman and British production designer, Floyd Hughes.
