= Mark Beachum =

American comic book artist

- Areas: Artist, Painter, Illustrator, Writer, Photographer, Filmmaker, Comic Art, Erotic Art, Fine Art, Art Film
- Pseudonyms: XL, Diamond, Mnem0sys, dv8xtc
- Notable works: Vampirella; Samuree; Spider-Man; Penthouse Comix
- Collaborators: Neal Adams, Trevor von Eeden, Josef Rubinstein, Michael Bair, Mark Texeira, Christopher Priest, Sandra Chang, Horatio Weisfeld, Peter David, Kristina Marie, Dennis Mallonee

Mark Beachum is an American comic book artist, writer, painter, publisher, photographer and filmmaker known for renditions of the female figure. Having worked for Marvel, DC, and Continuity, among others, his most notable credits include work in Web of Spider-Man, Samuree, Vampirella, Penthouse Comix, Razmataz, Alienzkin and Supergurlz.

Michael Bair summarizes Beachum:

...Sexy, Elegant. Before Adam Hughes, before Frank Cho... Beachum set the standard for "Sexy"...

— Michael Bair

Beachum has often expressed that superheroes are an erotic idiom, and that he is not interested in writing/drawing for children. Beachum is known for depicting men or women in a more erotic fashion. In New Talent Showcase, Mark is said to be influenced by Frank Frazetta, Hal Foster, Trevor Von Eeden, Michael Jackson, Neal Adams, and Alex Toth. He is also known in the industry for his unstructured work philosophy, as noted by Christopher Priest.

Mark Beachum, notorious gangster deadline breaker, had a standing deal with me: I NEVER gave him anything on a schedule because I knew it'd bring us into conflict. But I guaranteed he'd always have work. When he turned in Job A, I'd hand him another script. When he turned that one in, I'd hand him another. This way, Mark worked at his own pace, instead of getting kicked by me for being late. Of course he'd be late! He's Mark Beachum!! But, damn, that man can draw!!

— Christopher Priest

== Early life ==
Mark Beachum was born in New York City. He dropped out of the High School of Art & Design and continued his artistic development as an autodidact.

He worked at the Soundscape jazz club as he was making his way into the comic industry.

== Career ==
=== DC ===
In 1981 he came up to DC Comics and showed his portfolio to then-art director Dick Giordano, a short time after he was commissioned to draw a Batgirl story that was never published. However, in 1984 there was the Jenesis story on the New Talent Showcase, penciling a Wonder Woman story and the Huntress backup in Wonder Woman.

=== Marvel ===
Many covers for The Spectacular Spider-Man and Web of Spider-Man from the late 80s were created by Beachum. Together with Peter David over at Marvel, he created Spider-Man's adversary Ace, a street character, which, contrary to various reports, was not based on the musician Prince nor Michael Jackson; Ace was, in fact, modeled after Beachum himself.

FTR-- the character Ace was pretty much a self-portrait of Mark, only toned down a little. Yes, I said toned down. It kind of answered the question (as Mark in real life did): "What If Michael Jackson Looked Masculine?" He looked like Mark. He *was* Mark. Mark looks like a masculine Michael Jackson. An MJ that could kick your ass. He's tall and lean with a piercing gaze and funky hair. He *is* Ace.

— Christopher Priest

=== Continuity Comics ===
From the late 80s to early 90s Beachum is working with Neal Adams at Continuity Comics where he was doing both comics and commercial advertising art work. He became most notable for drawing the Samuree story while there; at the same time he also worked on Michael Jackson Pepsi commercial storyboards and animatics. Mark warmly recounts and regards the time spent around Neal Adams at Continuity Publishing, as the place where all kinds of creativeness intersected and the place he wanted to be.

Peter Stone, editor and writer at Continuity describes Beachum's dynamic in the studio:

...Mark would doddle around with and decide if he would finish it or not. If he didn't Neal would give him some money and finish it himself. Or Mark would disappear and return a week later with a painting. He was one of those people that everyone wanted to lock down and force them to do consistent work in a marketable style... but that just wasn't Mark. You took what he gave you and liked it.

— Peter Stone

=== Aja Blu ===
In 1990 Mark Beachum co-created an independent label Aja Blu Comix along with Sandra Chang, who was among the first self-published Asian-American female indie comic creators and one of the first women in the erotic comics field.The two of them did everything themselves: wrote, edited, penciled, inked, produced, published... to self-publish the Achilles Storm/Razmataz books.

=== Penthouse ===
At the time of its existence Penthouse Comix had the highest paying rate for comics and was priding itself on hand picking the best artists and in mid 90s Beachum painted the futuristic story Backlash written by Tom Thornton for them. Then he published his art portfolio FemmErotiSexiVision in the magazine as well as two stories Nightclaw and Latex Diva, which appeared in later issues of Penthouse Comix. The stories were painted as well as written by Beachum.

=== Other ===
In the early 90s Beachum was friendly with Horatio Weisfeld and did cover art for his Bullet Comics publications Radrex and BIO 90.

In 1994 he illustrated the Syphons story written by Allen Curtis. Originally published in color as a three issue mini-series by NOW Comics, a decade later in 2004 it was republished by Image Comics as a black and white graphic novel.

Around the time of working for Continuity and Penthouse, he began submitting fully painted art thus eliminating the need for either inker or colorist. The art would be produced using watercolors, acrylics, graphite, ink, markers or any mixture necessary to achieve the desired effect.

In the early 2000s when the Alienzkin GN came out, there was a new look to Beachum's work, he started using CG to add yet another dimension to his art.

Beachum created original characters for his Razmataz and Alienzkin books and shared his ideas about independent publishing with others. Hart D. Fisher cites Beachum as his inspiration to go independent and create his own company, Boneyard Press, after Beachum said to him: “Why do you want to spend all of your artistic energy on something someone else owns?”

=== Art Collectors ===
Mark Beachum created a logo for Sizzle magazine of NBM Publishing. Sizzle was the first place where his Alienzkin story was published over the course of three issues in 1999 (originally it was supposed to be called Razor Burn). NBM was in the process of moving to a new location, after the move they discovered that the original artwork for Alienzkin story was lost.

Beachum's artworks are numerous on the collectors' market, but several of them have been sold off without his permission on eBay.

Fellow comic artist Michael Bair collects Beachum art and tells that he would get paid with Mark Beachum art by Anubis Press. Beachum and Bair have done much work together; while some animosity has been reported between them between them.

=== Vampirella ===
Beachum produced Vampirella work and covers during the Harris era, some of the art consisted of paintings and photography mixed media art.

In 2019 he was approached to make a variant Vampirella cover for the upcoming Black History Month in which Vampirella would be portrayed as a black character, Christopher Priest and Matt Idelson were putting that idea together. Here is what Beachum had to say about his history with the character:

I was about 10 or 11 when I discovered Warren and that international cast of artists expanded my interest in art beyond the bandwidth of mainstream superheroes. Esteban Maroto, Jose Gonzalez, Jordi Bernet, Gonzalo Mayo, Frazetta, Vaughn Bodé, Sanjulián, and Enrich Torres were like a huge crew of brilliant art teachers showing me what was possible. Vampirella functioned as a landmark that provoked the modern era of creators to expand their ambitions. This is what inspired, has sustained and continues to instruct me to this day.

— Mark Beachum

=== Photography and Filmmaking ===
Sometime in the 90s Beachum started holding photo shoots for art reference and to include in his multimedia creations. He would shoot films and had models cosplaying as characters for him before it became mainstream.

Over the years he created numerous album covers and promotional photo shoots for artists and bands, among them: Mark Wood, The kHz, Natasha Komis, Illuminated ft Zen, Soco Fa Sho.

In 1996 together with artist Kristina Marie a.k.a. Glitterfist, Beachum puts out a portfolio of black and white erotic themed photos called FemmErotiSexiVision under his own label Elektrik Ladyland (play on Electric Ladyland album by Jimi Hendrix), Beachum autographed those as "Diamond". That same year, again with Kristina Marie, Beachum takes part in a music video shoot for the song "Boom N' Bust" by Japanese actor Masatoshi Nagase, who was working to promote his music career. The video was directed by Hal Hartley. In the video, Beachum sported blond hair, and Kristina Marie wore a fetish-wear PVC catsuit designed by Beachum, made by Madonna's designer.

During the mid 2000s, Beachum began venturing into film production. He showcased some of his film work on his websites, which appear to be between neo-noir and art-house that look inspired by Helmut Newton, Bob Carlos Clark, David Lynch, Shinya Tsukamoto.

In 2011 Beachum was cited to direct a short film based on Heroic Publishing's superheroine Flare. Heroic Publishing held a successful crowdsource campaign to fund the film.

== Bibliography ==
=== DC ===
- Wonder Woman #310, 314-318 (1983–84)
- New Talent Showcase #8-10 (1984)
- Thriller #7 (1984)
- Elvira's House of Mystery #4-6 (1986)
- The Outsiders #12 (Halo, Looker) (1986)
- Who's Who: Update '87 #3 (1987)
- Young All-Stars #12 (1988)
- Tales of the Teen Titans #90 (1988)
- The Comet #7 (Impact Comics, 1992)
- Jaguar #7-8, 10-11 (Impact Comics, 1992)
- The Ray #1 (1992)
- Green Lantern: Mosaic #9 (1993)

=== Marvel ===
- The Spectacular Spider-Man Annual #5-6 (1984-1985)
- Moon Knight: Fist Of Khonshu #6 (1985)
- The Spectacular Spider-Man #106, 112, 115, 120-121 (1985-1986)
- The Official Handbook Of The Marvel Universe #2, 7, 11 (1986)
- The Amazing Spider-Man Annual #20 (1986)
- Web of Spider-Man #11-16, 22 (1986-1987)
- Mark Hazzard: Merc #5 (1987)
- Marvel Age #47 (1987)
- Spider-Man / Dr. Strange: The Way To Dusty Death GN (1991)
- Hellstorm: Prince of Lies #1 (1993)
- Beavis & Butt-Head #10 (1994)
- Iron Man 2020 (1994)
- Spider-Man Saga vol.2 #1 (2010)
- Amazing Spider-Man Epic Collection: Kraven's Last Hunt (2017)
- Moon Knight Omnibus Vol. 2 (2022)

=== Continuity ===
- Samuree #1-7, 9 (1987-1991)
- Ms. Mystic #5 (1990)

=== Aja Blu Comix ===
- Achilles Storm Featuring Razmataz #1-4 (1990-1991)

=== Penthouse comix ===
- Penthouse Comix #4-11 (Backlash) (1994-1996)
- Penthouse Comix #12 (Cover, Nightclaw story) (1996)
- Penthouse Comix #32 (Latex Diva) (1998)

=== Hero Comics/Heroic Publishing ===
- Flare #1-7, 43-44, 47-48 (1988-2019)
- Flare First Edition #1-4 (1991-1993)
- Rose #1-3 (1992–93)
- Flare Trade Paperback #1-2 (2007)
- Liberty Comics #2 (2007)
- Flare Annual #2 (2009)
- Anthem #5 (2011)
- Flare Adventures #8-9, 31 (2012)
- Tigress #7 (2016)
- Sensational G-Girl #2, 5, 7 (2017-2022)

=== Vampirella: Harris/Dynamite ===
- Vampirella of Drakulon #5 (1996)
- Vampirella: Sad Wings of Destiny (1996)
- Vampirella of Drakulon #5 (1996)
- Vampirella: Death & Destruction LE #1 (1996)
- Vampirella: Silver Anniversary Collection #1, 2B, 3B (1997)
- Vampirella/Dracula: The Centennial (1997)
- Vampirella Monthly Series Preview Edition #1 (1997)
- Vampirella: Silver Anniversary Collection #1-4 (1997)
- Vampirella Dracula and Pantha Showcase #1 (1997)
- Vampirella Crossover Gallery #1 (1997)
- The Best of Vampirella #1 – Lost Tales (Harris Comics, 2008)
- Art of Vampirella HC (Dynamite, 2010)
- Vampirella Masters Series Vol. 2: Warren Ellis (Dynamite, 2010)
- Vampirella #8 1:75 (Dynamite, 2020)
- Vampirella (Vol. 5) #8 (Dynamite, 2020)

=== Eros ===
- Razmataz GN (Eros Comix, 2001)
- Alienzkin GN (Eros Comix, 2003)

=== Self Publishing ===
- Synthetik XS v1 (2009)
- Supergurlz: In Trouble v1 (2011)
- Razorgurlz (2014)
- Syllabus Erotique [module 1] (2017)

=== Other Publishers ===
- Black Diamond #1 (AC, 1983)
- Ninja #1 Special (Eternity Comics, 1987)
- Danse #1 (Blackthorne Publishing, 1987)
- Delirium #1 (Metro Comics, 1987)
- Halo Jones #8-9 (Quality Comics, 1987)
- Ex-Mutants: The Shattered Earth Chronicles #8 (Eternity Comics, 1987)
- The A1 True Life Bikini Confidential #1 (Atomeka Press, 1990)
- Radrex #1-3 (Bullet Comics, 1990)
- Green Hornet #24 (NOW Comics, 1991)
- Raw Media Mags #1 (Rebel Studios, 1991)
- BIO 90 #1 (Bullet Comics, 1992)
- The Choke #1 LE (Anubis Press, 1992)
- Black Dominion #2 (Anubis Press, 1993)
- WildC.A.T.s Trilogy #3 (Image Comics, 1993)
- Syphons Preview Edition (NOW Comics, 1994)
- Syphons #1-3 (NOW Comics, 1994)
- Hustler Comix vol.2 #1 (Web of the Black Tarantula story) (LFP Inc., 1998)
- Stain #1 (Robot Print) (Fathom Press, 1998)
- Forbidden Zone #1 (Galaxy Publishing, 1999)
- Sizzle #3-5 (Alienzkin) (NBM Publishing, 1999)
- Faust: Singha’s Talons #0.5, 1 (Avatar Press, 2000)
- Alter Ego #9 (TwoMorrows Publishing, 2001)
- Syphons GN (Image Comics, 2004)
- Agent Wild Union Fall #1 (Dork Empire, 2020)

=== Portfolios ===
- Strength of Man (BlackThorne Publishing, 1986)
- Midnight Silk together with Rick Bryant (S.Q. Productions, 1987)
- Femmerotisexivision: the erotic art of Mark Beachum(Elektrik Ladyland, 1996)
