= Thriller (DC Comics) =

- Thriller #1 (Nov. 1983), cover art by Trevor Von Eeden.

Publication information
- Publisher: DC Comics
- Schedule: Monthly
- Format: Ongoing while in publication
- Publication date: November 1983 – November 1984
- No. of issues: 12
- Main character(s): Angeline Thriller; Beaker Parish; Crackerjack; Daniel Grove; Data; Proxy; Salvo; White Satin

Creative team
- Created by: Robert Loren Fleming; Trevor Von Eeden
- Written by: Robert Loren Fleming
- Artist: Trevor Von Eeden
- Letterer: Todd Klein

Thriller was a short-lived comic book series published by DC Comics beginning in November 1983. The series was originally written by Robert Loren Fleming and drawn by Trevor Von Eeden. It was sold only through the direct market. The taglines for the series were, "She has 7 seconds to save the world" and "You can't read it fast enough". The "she" in question was protagonist Angeline Thriller. The "7 seconds" referred to a team of operatives who assisted her in various conflicts.

Fleming stated “Thriller was originally conceived as a cross between The Shadow, Doc Savage, and The X-Men.”

== Publication history ==
Thriller ran for 12 issues (November 1983 – November 1984). After the first seven issues, Fleming left the series and Von Eeden left after issue #8. The series ran four more issues by writer Bill DuBay and artist Alex Niño.

== Cast ==
=== Angeline Thriller ===
Angeline Marietta Salvotini Thriller was the leader of a team of adventurers called the Seven Seconds, who were based in New York City a subjective "fifty years in the future".

Angeline had the power to become one with any inanimate object, and thus control it. She could cause her face to appear on an object or even in the sky. The only living beings she could merge with were her twin brother Tony, and the artificially created Beaker Parish. Angeline could also see visions of possible future events.

Very much in the vein of pulp heroes such as The Shadow or Doc Savage, Angeline Thriller was described in early publicity as being "like a cross between Jesus Christ and my Mom" by Fleming, and she served as the ethereal leader for her team.

=== The Seven Seconds ===
- Beaker Parish - The test tube experiment of two renegade college science students resulted in a 7-foot-tall (2.1 m) red-headed priest with unexplained psychic abilities. Beaker was a childhood friend of Tony.
- Crackerjack - A youthful Honduran pickpocket, who was the ward of Angeline's husband, Edward Thriller. He had no given name, assists with the care of Angeline and Edward's son, Scotty, and served as an all around "gopher" for the team.
- Daniel Grove - A photojournalist who filmed his brother's execution by the villain Scabbard. Grove was saved from Scabbard by Angeline, and offered the chance to join the Seven Seconds.
- Data - Freddie Martin was the son of the President of the United States. He was the team's communications and information expert, and worked with the team from an enhanced computer system built into his limo, one which Data was physically interfaced with and could never leave.
- Proxy - Robert Furrillo, Tony's best friend. Bob was an actor, who suffered a disfiguring accident while freebasing drugs. Proxy used a synthetic spray on skin to create new disguises for the team's more covert requirements.
- Salvo - Angeline's brother, Anthony Salvatore Salvotini, was a former mercenary soldier and member of the U.S. Marines' Rapid Deployment Force. After mistakenly killing an innocent man, Salvo vowed to never again shoot to kill. He would instead only wound his targets, his motto being "only flesh wounds, only out-patients".
- White Satin - Janet Valentine was Tony's girlfriend, and Quo's ex-wife. She had extranormal abilities and could disrupt a person's physiology and mental state with a touch. She was also a jet pilot, hence the nickname "Jet", coined by Salvo.

=== Supporting characters ===
- Edward Thriller - Edward was Angeline's scientist husband, whose experiments with alien DNA resulted in his merging bodies with his wife, and resulted in her attaining godlike powers. They could not co-exist in the same place at the same time.
- Kane Creole - Two different clones of the original Kane Creole (a homage of Elvis Presley). They started out as actors doing bank robberies for publicity, but eventually ran afoul of the Seven Seconds and were taken in by Edward.
- Mallochia - Molly Lusk, a woman with psychic powers, is the daughter of Moses Lusk and Scabbard's lover. She had also once served as Scotty's nanny.
- Marietta Salvotini - Tony and Angeline's widowed mother, who operates a diner named "Home". She was originally blinded in a fire (accidentally started by Tony as a child) which claimed the life of her husband, Peter, and later gained eyesight and hypnotic powers due to the machinations of Quo.
- Quo - Richard Quorum, former husband of Janet Valentine; a student of certain Eastern disciplines. Quo ascended to a higher state and appears usually when events are at a crisis point of some sort.
- Scotty Thriller - Angeline and Edward's baby boy, who appeared to be perfectly normal in every way.

=== Villains ===
- Moses Lusk - Shared a Nobel Prize with Edward Thriller for research that led to the cure for cancer. Years earlier, Moses had implanted genetic material from his own cells into Marietta Salvotini, who gave birth to twins. The girl Angeline was Moses' biological daughter, while the boy Anthony was the son of Marietta's husband, Peter. Moses was also the father of Molly Lusk.
- Scabbard - Leader of Molluskan terrorists. He beheaded Daniel Grove's twin brother, Ken.

== Plot ==
The Seven Seconds usually investigated cases involving unusual menaces, some bordering on the supernatural. On their most notable mission, they were able to thwart Moses Lusk's attempt to bring about a nuclear holocaust and destroy all life on Earth.
