= Fanny Hill =

1748 erotic novel by John Cleland

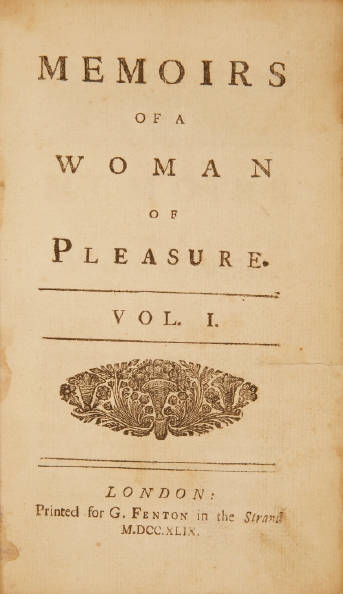
- One of earliest editions, 1749 (MDCCXLIX)
- Author: John Cleland
- Original title: Memoirs of a Woman of Pleasure
- Language: English
- Genre: Erotic novel
- Publication date: 21 November 1748; February 1749
- Publication place: Great Britain
- Media type: Print (hardback and paperback)
- OCLC: 13050889
- Dewey Decimal: 823/.6 19
- LC Class: PR3348.C65 M45

Memoirs of a Woman of Pleasure – popularly known as Fanny Hill – is an erotic novel by the English novelist John Cleland first published in London in 1748 and 1749. Written while the author was in debtors' prison in London, it is considered "the first original English prose pornography, and the first pornography to use the form of the novel". It is one of the most prosecuted and banned books in history.

The book exemplifies the use of euphemism. The text has no swearing or explicit scientific terms for body parts, but uses many literary devices to describe genitalia. For example, the vagina is sometimes referred to as "the nethermouth".

A critical edition by Peter Sabor includes a bibliography and explanatory notes. The collection Launching "Fanny Hill" contains several essays on the historical, social and economic themes underlying the novel.

== Publishing history ==
The novel was published in two installments, on 21 November 1748 and in February 1749, by Fenton Griffiths and his brother Ralph under the name "G. Fenton". There has been speculation that the novel was at least partly written by 1740, when Cleland was stationed in Bombay as an employee of the East India Company.

Initially, there was no governmental reaction to the novel. However, in November 1749, a year after the first installment was published, Cleland and Ralph Griffiths were arrested and charged with "corrupting the King's subjects". In court, Cleland renounced the novel and it was officially withdrawn.

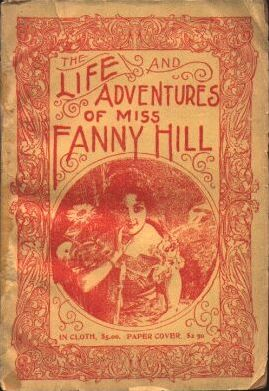
Cover of an undated American edition of Fanny Hill, c. 1910

As the book became popular, pirate editions appeared. It was once believed that the scene near the end, in which Fanny reacts with disgust at the sight of two young men engaging in anal intercourse, was an interpolation made for these pirated editions, but the scene is present in the first edition (p. xxiii). In the 19th century, copies of the book were sold underground in the UK, the US and elsewhere. In 1887, a French edition appeared with illustrations by Édouard-Henri Avril.

The book eventually made its way to the United States. In 1821, a Massachusetts court outlawed Fanny Hill. The publisher, Peter Holmes, was convicted for printing a "lewd and obscene" novel. Holmes appealed to the Massachusetts Supreme Court. He claimed that the judge, relying only on the prosecution's description, had not even seen the book. The state Supreme Court was not swayed. The Chief Justice wrote that Holmes was "a scandalous and evil disposed person" who had contrived to "debauch and corrupt" the citizens of Massachusetts and "to raise and create in their minds inordinate and lustful desires".

=== Mayflower (UK) edition ===
In 1963, after the 1960 court decision in R v Penguin Books Ltd that allowed the continuing publication of Lady Chatterley's Lover, Gareth Powell's Mayflower Books published an uncensored paperback version of Fanny Hill. The police became aware of the 1963 edition a few days before publication, having spotted a sign in the window of the Magic Shop in Tottenham Court Road in London, run by Ralph Gold. An officer went to the shop, bought a copy, and delivered it to Bow Street magistrate Sir Robert Blundell, who issued a search warrant. At the same time, two officers from the Metropolitan Police's Obscene Publications Branch visited Mayflower Books in Vauxhall Bridge Road to determine whether copies of the book were kept on the premises. They interviewed Powell, the publisher, and took away the five copies there. The police returned to the Magic Shop and seized 171 copies of the book, and in December, Gold was summonsed under section 3 of the Obscene Publications Act 1959. By then, Mayflower had distributed 82,000 copies of the book, but it was Gold who was being tried, although Mayflower covered the legal costs. The trial took place in February 1964. The defence argued that Fanny Hill was a historical source book and that it was a joyful celebration of normal non-perverted sex—bawdy rather than pornographic. The prosecution countered by stressing one atypical scene involving flagellation, and won. Mayflower elected not to appeal.

Luxor Press published a 9/6 edition in January 1964, using text "exactly the same as that employed for the de-luxe edition" in 1963. The back cover features praise from The Daily Telegraph and from the author and critic Marghanita Laski. It went through many reprints in the first couple of years.

The Mayflower case highlighted the growing disconnect between the obscenity laws and the permissive society that was developing in late 1960s Britain, and was instrumental in shifting views to the point where in 1970 an uncensored version of Fanny Hill was again published in Britain.

=== 1960s US edition: prosecutions and court rulings ===
In 1963, Putnam published the book in the United States under the title John Cleland's Memoirs of a Woman of Pleasure. This edition led to the arrest of New York City bookstore owner Irwin Weisfeld and clerk John Downs as part of an anti-obscenity campaign orchestrated by several major political figures. Weisfeld's conviction was eventually overturned in state court and the New York ban of Fanny Hill lifted. The new edition was also banned for obscenity in Massachusetts, after a mother complained to the state's Obscene Literature Control Commission. The Massachusetts high court did rule Fanny Hill obscene and the publisher's challenge to the ban then went up to the Supreme Court. In a landmark decision in 1966, the United States Supreme Court ruled in Memoirs v. Massachusetts that Fanny Hill did not meet the Roth standard for obscenity.

== Illustrations ==
The original work was not illustrated, but many editions of this book have contained illustrations, often depicting the novel's sexual content. Distributors of the novel such as John Crosby were imprisoned for "exhibiting [not selling] to sundry persons a certain lewd and indecent book, containing very lewd and obscene pictures or engravings". Sellers of the novel such as Peter Holmes were imprisoned and charged that they "did utter, publish and deliver to one [name]; a certain lewd, wicked, scandalous, infamous and obscene print, on paper, was contained in a certain printed book then and there uttered, [2] published and delivered by him said Peter Holmes intitled "Memoirs of a Woman Of Pleasure" to manifest corruption and subversion of youth, and other good citizens ... "

None of the story's scenes have been exempt from illustration. Illustrations of this novel vary from the first homosexual experience to the flagellation scene.

Although editions of the book have frequently featured illustrations, many have been of poor quality. An exception to this is the set of mezzotints, probably designed by the artist George Morland and engraved by his friend John Raphael Smith that accompanied one edition.

== Plot ==
The novel consists of two long letters (which appear as volumes I and II of the original edition) to an unnamed acquaintance identified only as 'Madam,' written by Frances 'Fanny' Hill, a rich Englishwoman in her middle age, who leads a life of contentment with her loving husband Charles and their children. Fanny has been prevailed upon by 'Madam' to recount the 'scandalous stages' of her earlier life, which she proceeds to do with 'stark naked truth' as her governing principle.

The first letter begins with a short account of Fanny's impoverished childhood in a Lancashire village. At age 14, she loses her parents to smallpox, arrives in London to look for domestic work, and gets lured into a brothel. She sees a sexual encounter between an ugly older couple and another between a young attractive couple, and participates in a lesbian encounter of masturbation with Phoebe, a bisexual prostitute. A customer, Charles, meets Fanny and the two fall in love at first sight, leading to Charles persuading her to escape, while paying a sum of money to secure Fanny's escape. She has sex with Charles and becomes his lover. Charles is sent away by deception to the South Seas, and Fanny is driven by desperation and poverty to become the kept woman of a rich merchant named Mr H—. After enjoying a brief period of stability, she sees Mr H— have a sexual encounter with her own maid, and goes on to seduce Will (the young footman of Mr H—) as an act of revenge. She is discovered by Mr H— as she is having a sexual encounter with Will. After being abandoned by Mr H—, Fanny becomes a prostitute for wealthy clients in a pleasure-house run by Mrs Cole. This marks the end of the first letter.

The second letter begins with a rumination on the tedium of writing about sex and the difficulty of driving a middle course between vulgar language and "mincing metaphors and affected circumlocutions". Fanny then describes her adventures in the house of Mrs Cole, which include an orgy, an elaborately orchestrated bogus sale of her "virginity" to a rich dupe called Mr Norbert, and a sado-masochistic session with a man involving mutual flagellation with birch-rods. These are interspersed with narratives which do not involve Fanny directly; for instance, the three other girls in Mrs Cole's house (Emily, Louisa and Harriett) describe their own losses of virginity, and the nymphomaniac Louisa seduces the immensely endowed but imbecilic "good-natured Dick". Fanny also describes anal intercourse between two older boys (removed from several later editions). Eventually Fanny retires from prostitution and becomes the lover of a rich and worldly-wise man of 60, after coming to his aid during a fit of coughing whilst out for a morning walk. (The elder man is described by Fanny as a "rational pleasurist"). This phase of Fanny's life brings about her intellectual development, and leaves her wealthy when her lover dies of a sudden cold. Soon after, she has a chance encounter with Charles, who has returned as a poor man to England after being shipwrecked. Fanny offers her fortune to Charles unconditionally, but he insists on marrying her.

The novel's developed characters include Charles, Mrs Jones (Fanny's landlady), Mrs Cole, Will, Mr H— and Mr Norbert. The prose includes long sentences with many subordinate clauses. Its morality is conventional for the time, in that it denounces sodomy, frowns upon vice and approves of only heterosexual unions based upon mutual love.

== Analysis ==
The plot was described as 'operatic' by John Hollander, who said that "the book's language and its protagonist's character are its greatest virtues".

Literary critic Felicity A. Nussbaum describes the girls in Mrs Cole's brothel as "'a little troop of love' who provide compliments, caresses, and congratulation to their fellow whores' erotic achievements".

According to literary critic Thomas Holmes, Fanny and Mrs Cole see the homosexual act thus: "the act subverts not only the hierarchy of the male over the female, but also what they consider nature's law regarding the role of intercourse and procreation," while silmultaneously celebrating their own lives of wanton sexual behavior and prostitution.

=== Metonymy ===
Numerous scholars claim that Fanny refers to a woman's vulva or that Hill refers to the mons pubis, mound of Venus, but this interpretation lacks corroborating evidence: the term "fanny" is first known to have been used to mean female genitalia in the 1830s, and no 18th-century dictionary defines "fanny" this way.

=== Disability ===
Later in the text when Fanny is with Louisa, they come across a boy nicknamed "Good-natured Dick" who is described as having some mental disability/handicap. Louisa brings the boy in anyway, as Dick's functioning physical state supersedes his poor mental one. This scene also leads into an issue within the text of rape (for both Dick and Louisa) and how the possible label of rape is removed by resistance transitioning into pleasure.

=== Fanny Hill as a Bildungsroman ===
One scholar, David McCracken, writes about Fanny Hill as a bildungsroman. Her sexual development contains three life stages: innocence, experimentation, and experience. McCracken specifically addresses how Fanny's word selections on describing the phallus change throughout the stages. Fanny sees the phallus as both an object of terror and of delight. McCracken relates her changing view of the phallus to Burke's theory of the sublime and beautiful.

=== Shame ===
Patricia Spacks discusses how Fanny has been previously deprived by her rural environment of what she can understand as real experience, and how she welcomes the whores' efforts to educate her. Since Fanny is so quickly catapulted into her new life, she has had little time to reflect on the shame and regret that she feels for leading a life of adultery, and replaces this shame with the pleasure of sexual encounters with men and women. Even though these feelings may have been replaced or forgotten, she still reflects on her past: "...and since I was now bent over the bar, I thought by plunging over head and ears into the stream I was hurried away by, to drown all sense of shame or reflection". Having little time to think about how she feels about her transition, she masks her thoughts with sexual pleasure, yet this is not a total fix to forget her emotions.

=== Narrative voice ===
Andrea Haslanger argues in her dissertation how the use of first-person narrative in the 18th century "undermines, rather than secures, the individual" in classic epistolary novels like Roxana by Daniel Defoe, Evelina by Fanny Burney, Frankenstein by Mary Shelley and specifically Fanny Hill. Haslanger claims that "the paradox of pornographic narration is that it mobilizes certain aspects of the first person (the description of intimate details) while eradicating others (the expression of disagreement or resistance)" (19). With this in mind, she raises the question of "whether 'I' denotes consciousness or body or both" (34).

=== Fanny Hill versus the traditional conduct novel ===
With sexual acts being viewed as taboo within 18th-century England, Fanny Hill strayed far away from the norm in comparison to other works of its time. A large portion of books that focused on the idea of sex were written in the form of conduct novels: books that would focus on teaching women the proper ways to behave and live their lives in as virtuous a manner as possible. These novels encouraged women to stay away from sexual deviance, for if they were to remain virtuous then they would ultimately be rewarded. One example of this is Samuel Richardson's conduct novel Pamela; or, Virtue Rewarded, in which the character of Pamela is able to resist sexual temptation, thus maintaining her virtue and being rewarded in the end with a prosperous life.

However, Fanny Hill was widely considered to be the first work of its time to focus on the idea of sexual deviance being an act of pleasure, rather than something that was simply shameful. This can be seen through Fanny's character partaking in acts that would normally be viewed as deplorable by society's standards, but then is never punished for them. In fact, Fanny is ultimately able to achieve a happy ending, finding Charles again, marrying him and living a wealthy life. This can be viewed in sharp contrast to a work like Pamela, where sexual acts are avoided for the sake of maintaining virtue. Meanwhile, within Fanny Hill, normally deplorable acts can be conducted with little to no consequence.

The art historian Johann Joachim Winckelmann recommended the work in a letter for "its delicate sensitivities and noble ideas" expressed in "an elevated Pindaric style".

== Film, literary and other adaptations ==
Because of the book's notoriety (and public domain status), numerous adaptations have been produced. Some of them are:

- Fanny Hill (US/West Germany, 1964), starring Letícia Román, Miriam Hopkins, Ulli Lommel, Chris Howland; directed by Russ Meyer, Albert Zugsmith (uncredited)
- The Notorious Daughter of Fanny Hill (US, 1966), starring Stacy Walker, Ginger Hale; directed by Peter Perry (Arthur Stootsbury).
- Fanny Hill (Sweden, 1968), starring Diana Kjær, Hans Ernback, Keve Hjelm, Oscar Ljung; directed by Mac Ahlberg
- Fanny, Being the True History of the Adventures of Fanny Hackabout-Jones (1980) (a retelling of 'Fanny Hill' by Erica Jong purports to tell the story from Fanny's point of view, with Cleland as a character she complains fictionalised her life).
- Fanny Hill (West Germany/UK, 1983), starring Lisa Foster, Oliver Reed, Wilfrid Hyde-White, Shelley Winters; directed by Gerry O'Hara
- Paprika (Italy, 1991), starring Debora Caprioglio, Stéphane Bonnet, Stéphane Ferrara, Luigi Laezza, Rossana Gavinel, Martine Brochard and John Steiner; directed by Tinto Brass.
- Fanny Hill (UK, 1995), directed by Valentine Palmer.
- Fanny Hill (Off-Broadway Musical, 2006), libretto and score by Ed Dixon, starring Nancy Anderson as Fanny.
- Fanny Hill (UK, 2007), written by Andrew Davies for the BBC and starring Samantha Bond and Rebecca Night.
- Erich von Götha de la Rosière adapted the novel into a comic book version.

== Illustrations based on Fanny Hill ==
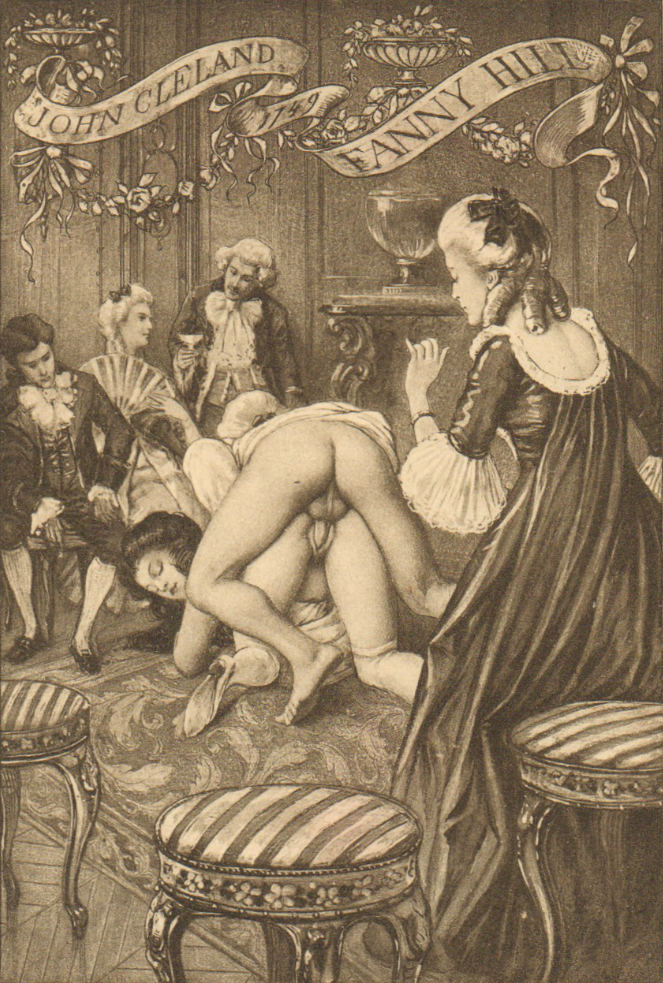
Illustration I: The Ceremonial of Fanny's initiation, Édouard-Henri Avril, 1907

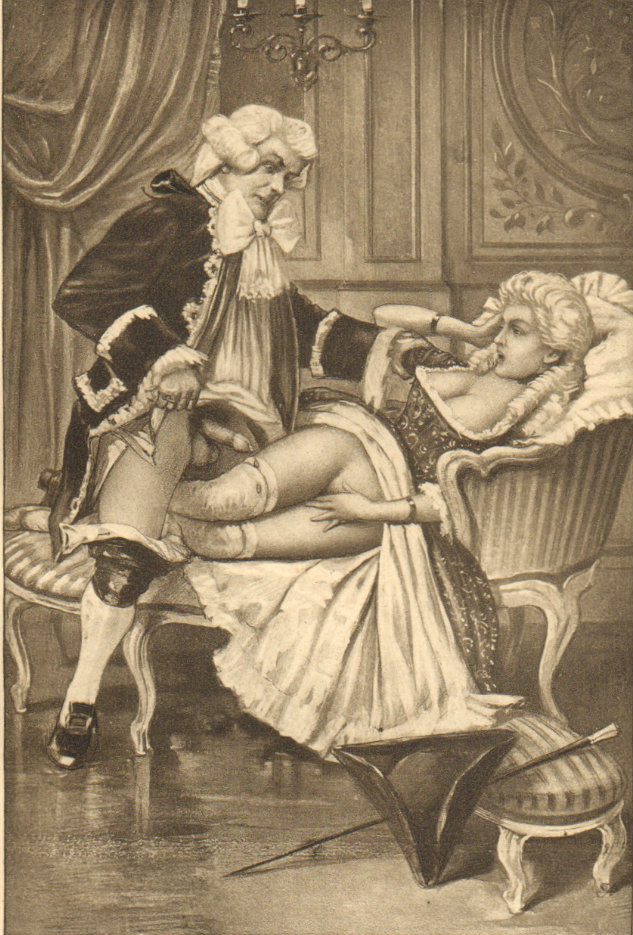
Illustration II: Mr Croft's attempt to seduce Fanny, Édouard-Henri Avril, 1907

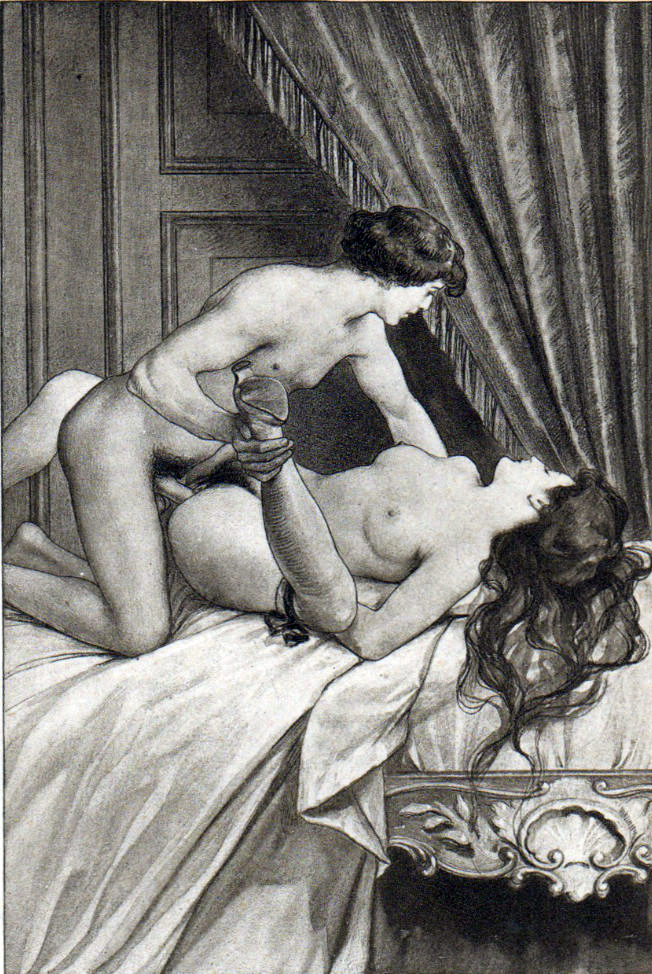
Illustration III: Polly Philips and the young Italian, Édouard-Henri Avril, 1907

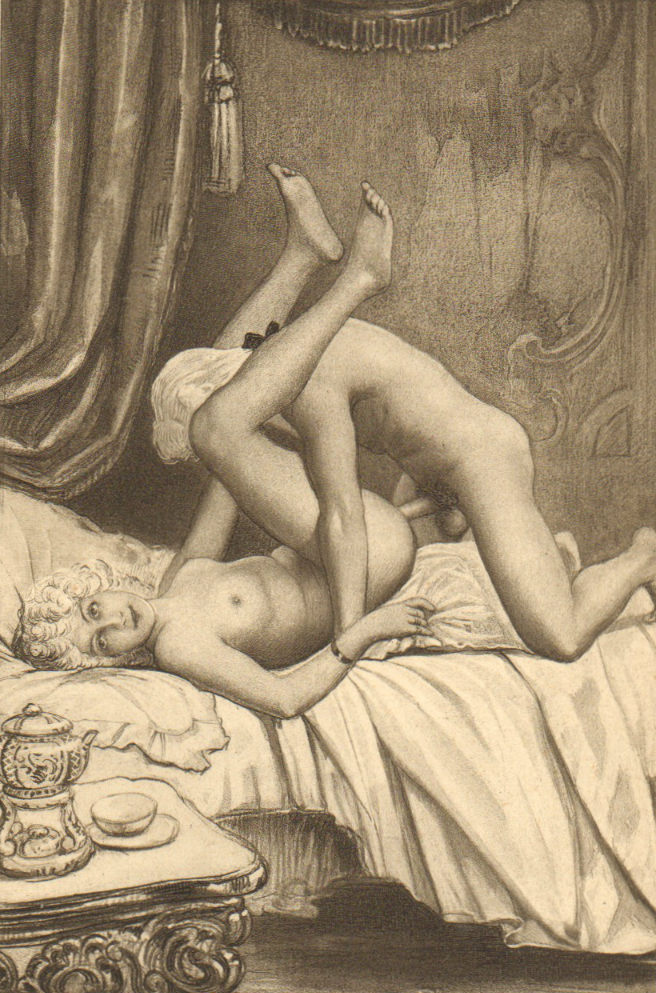
Illustration IV: Charles plucks Fanny's virgin flower, Édouard-Henri Avril, 1907

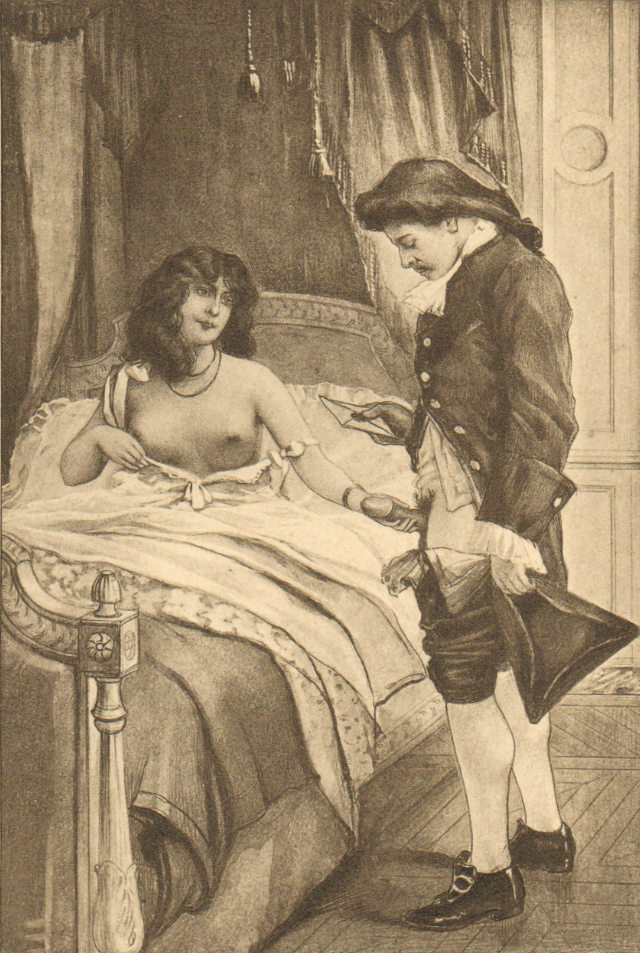
Illustration V: Fanny emboldens William, Édouard-Henri Avril, 1907

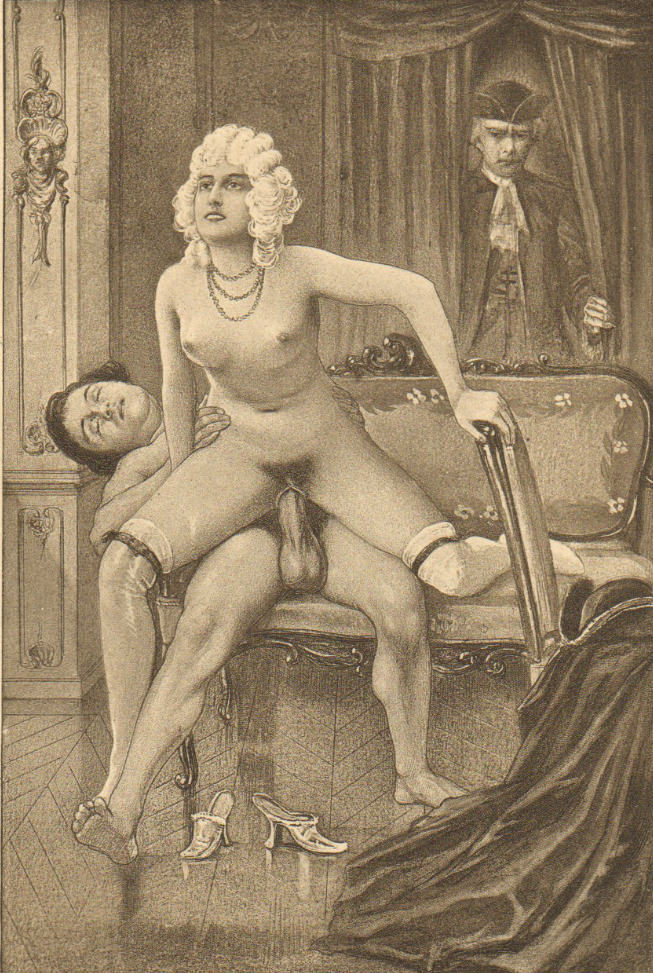
Illustration VI: Mr. H... surprises Fanny and William, Édouard-Henri Avril, 1907

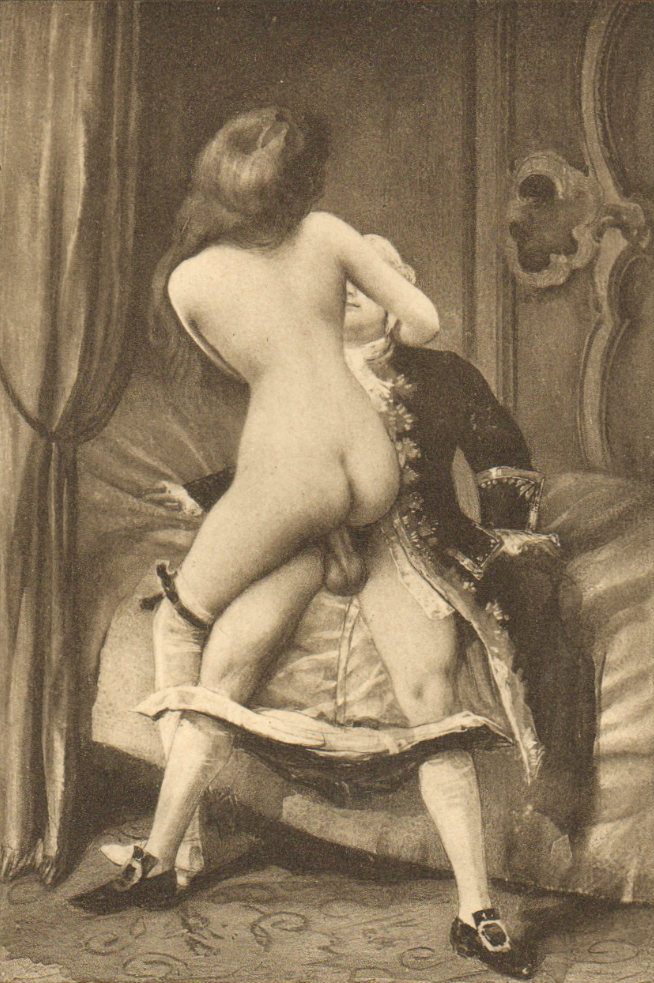
Illustration VII: Louisa and the lodger's son, Édouard-Henri Avril, 1907

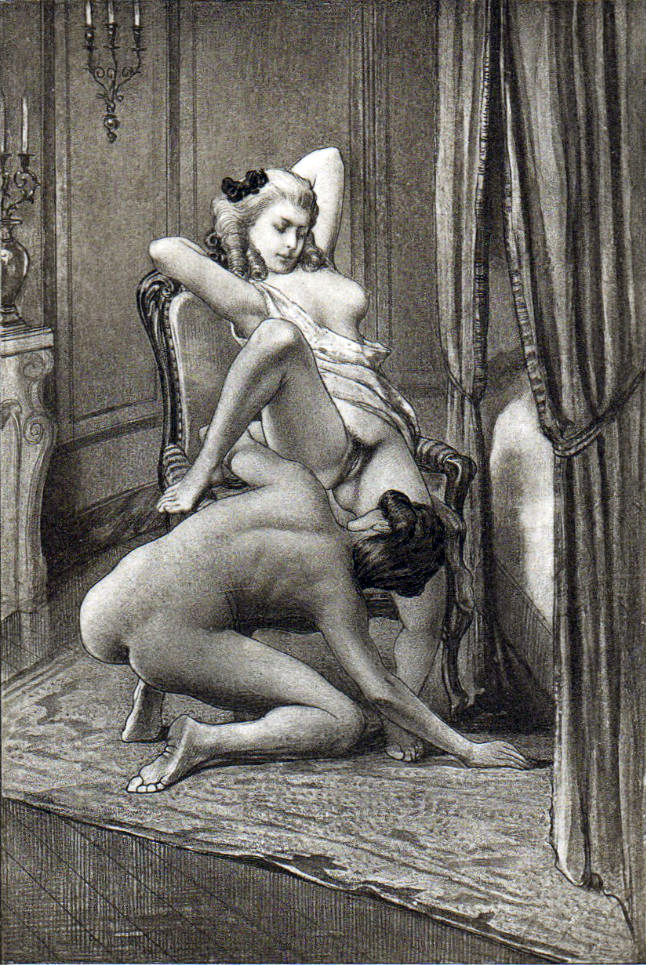
Illustration VIII: Fanny's beauties displayed, Édouard-Henri Avril, 1907

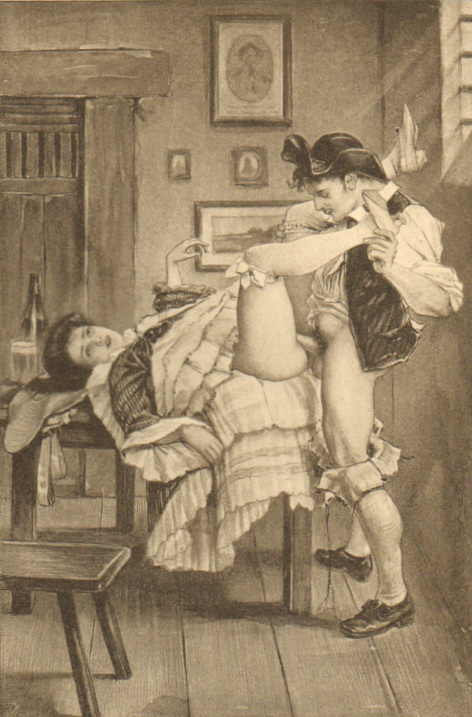
Illustration IX: Fanny and the sailor, Édouard-Henri Avril, 1907

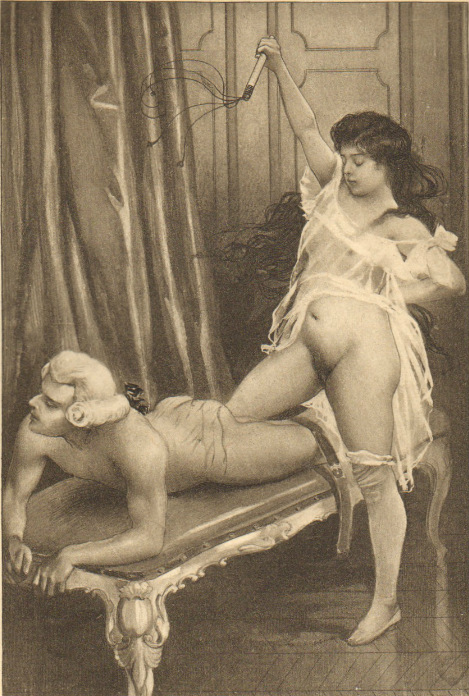
Illustration X: Fanny whips Mr. Barville, Édouard-Henri Avril, 1907

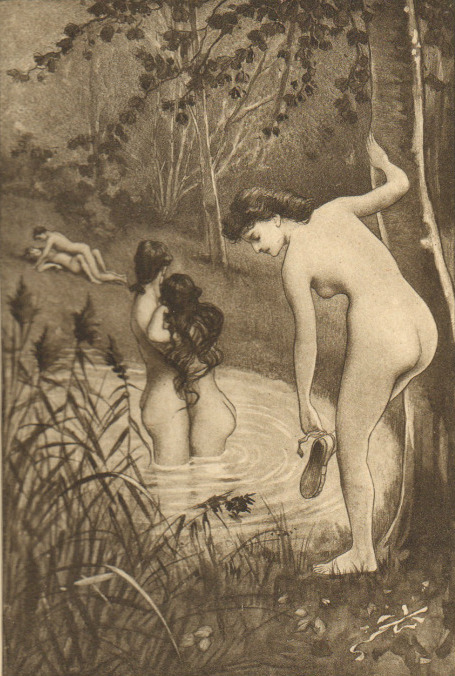
Illustration XI: The bathing party, Édouard-Henri Avril, 1907

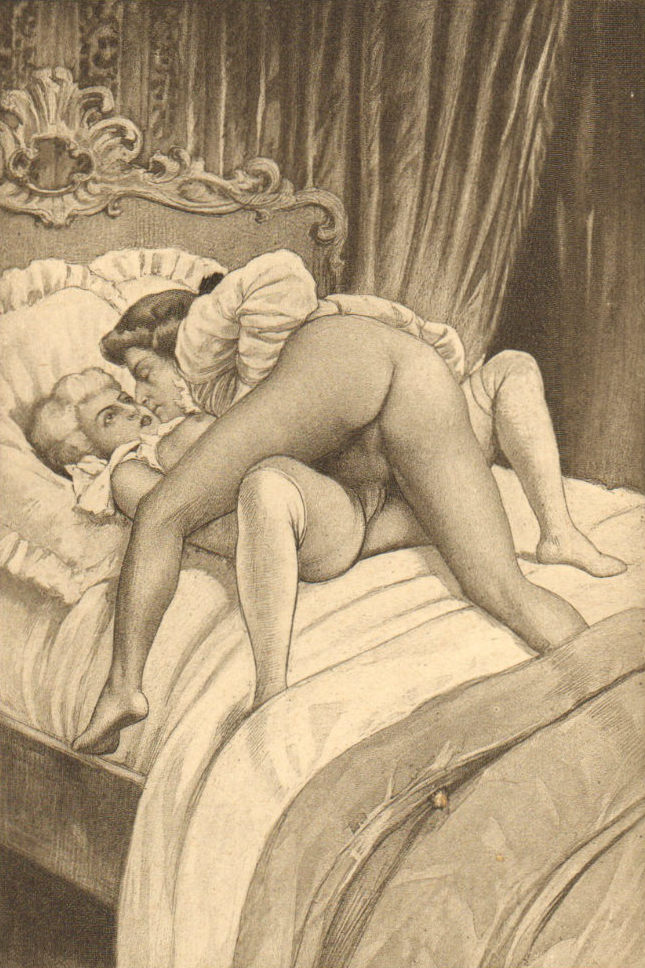
Illustration XII: Charles and Fanny, Édouard-Henri Avril, 1907

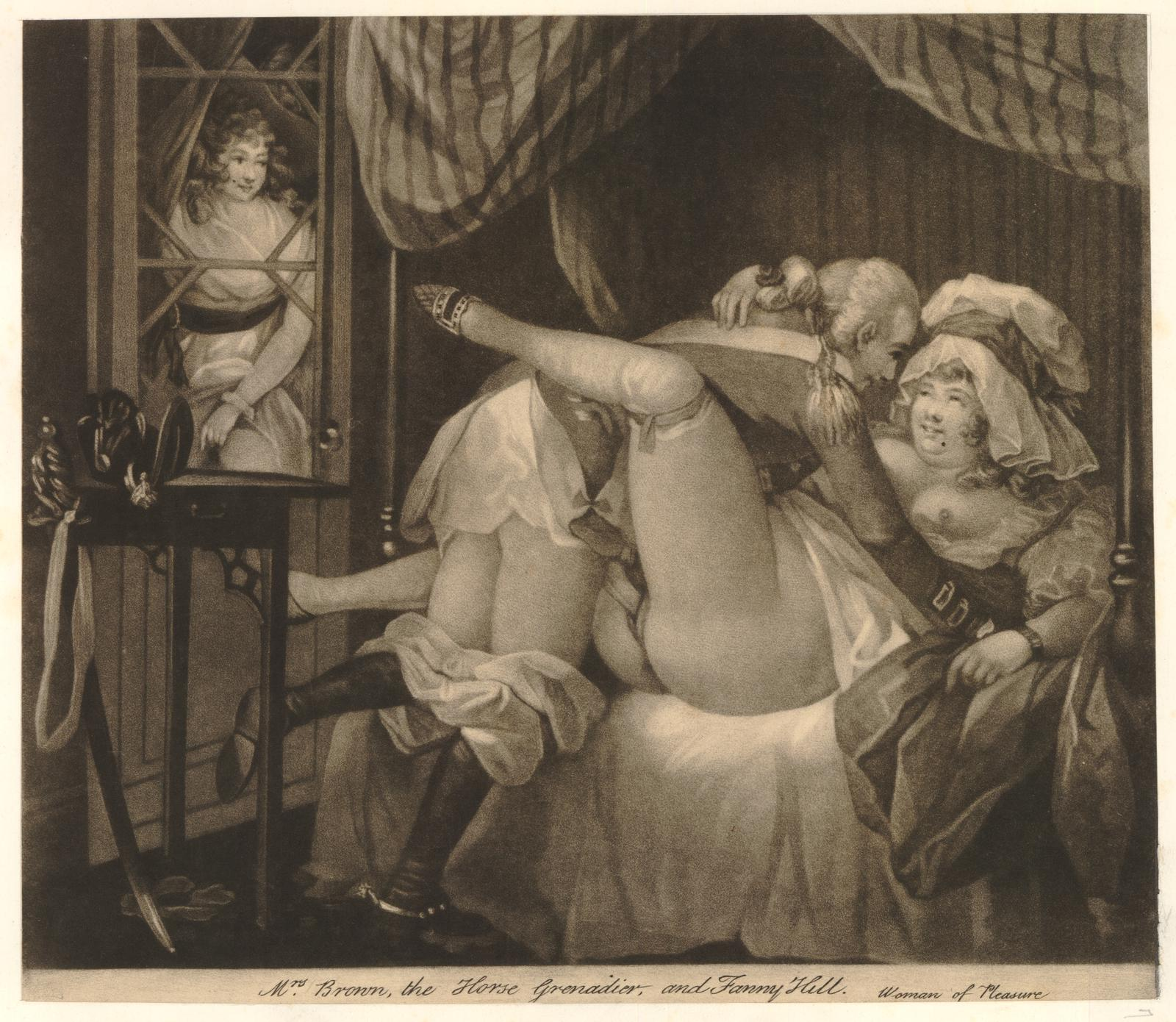
Mrs Brown, the Horse Grenadier, and Fanny Hill, between 1748 and 1800

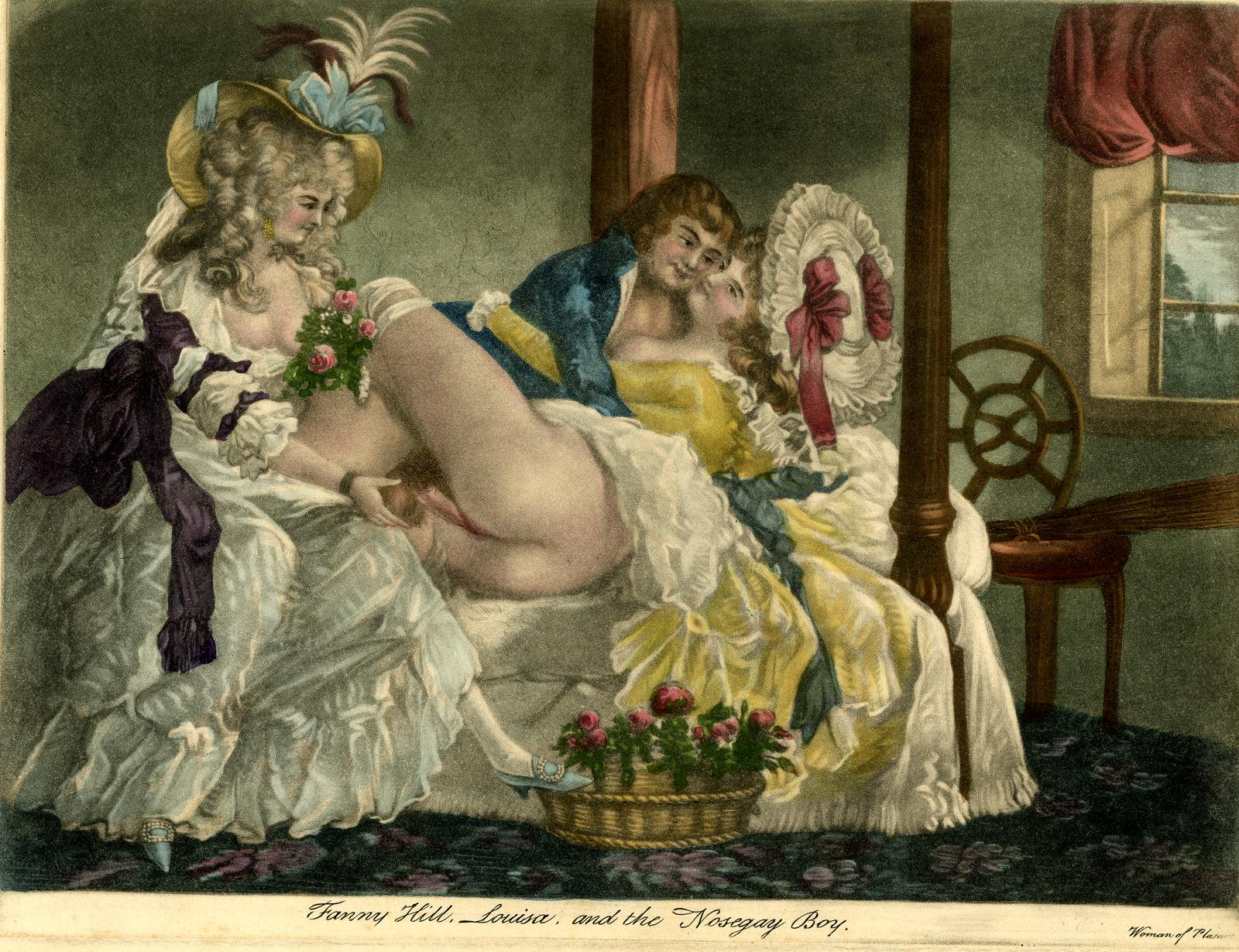
Fanny Hill, Louisa, and the Nosegay Boy, circa 1787

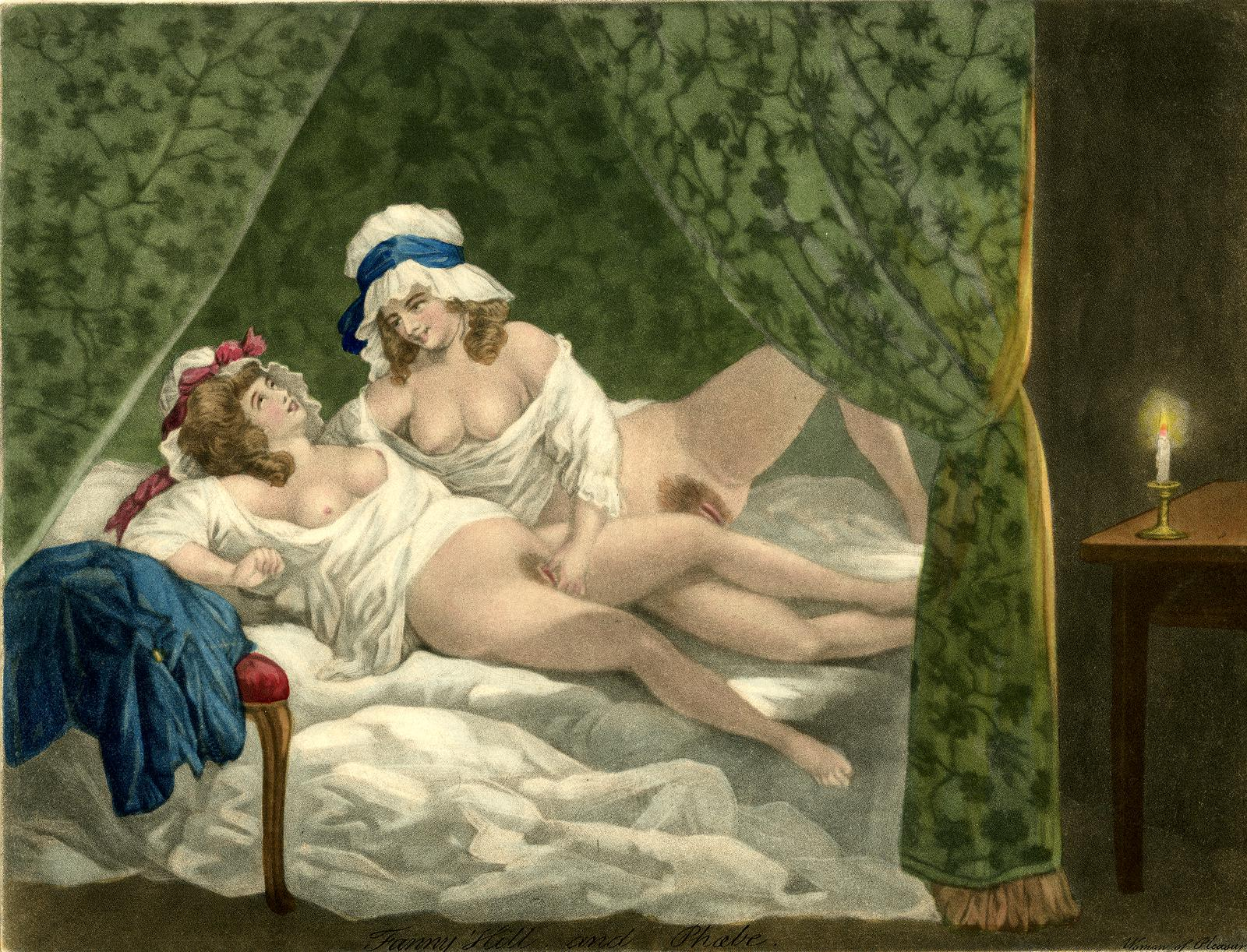
Fanny Hill and Phoebe, circa 1787

== See also ==
- Banned in Boston – Phrase used to describe a work prohibited in Boston
- Book censorship – Book removed or banned from public and/or private usage
- Erotic literature – Literary genre
- Index Librorum Prohibitorum – Publications deemed heretical for Catholics
- Josephine Mutzenbacher – 1906 erotic Austrian novel
- Kama Sutra – Ancient Hindu text on erotic love
- Libertinism
