= Horatio Weisfeld =

American magazine editor

- Area: Artist
- Notable works: Penthouse Comix, Heavy Metal

Horatio "Ray" Weisfeld is a writer/editor/publisher who co-founded mass-market comics magazines and developed other media properties. His creation of often irreverent commercial entertainment follows in the footsteps of his father, Irwin Weisfeld, a writer and manufacturer of ubiquitous mid-late '60s counterculture buttons.

== Early Years In Business/Publishing ==
In the early 1990s, Weisfeld co-founded and financed Bullet Comics, which published one of the first Manga influenced American comics: Greg Boone's RADREX. Weisfeld was also instrumental in helping his friend, artist Mark Beachum, set up Aja Blu Comix. Weisfeld then advised Brian Pulido in the formation of Chaos! Comics (Lady Death), one of the more successful independent comic publishers of the era.

In 1992, a former publisher of The New York Post hired Weisfeld to work on the startup of Her New York, a daily newspaper published from offices of New York's Trump Tower. Weisfeld became Newsroom Manager (and later assistant) to Editor-in-Chief Marsha Cohen (formerly of The New York Daily News) and Entertainment Editor Barbara Gordon (who wrote bestseller I'm Dancing as Fast as I Can).

== Penthouse Comix ==
In 1993, Weisfeld was named managing editor of Penthouse Comix, an ongoing section that ran in Penthouse Magazine. At Weisfeld's suggestion publisher Bob Guccione agreed to a plan that would allow Penthouse Comix to cherry pick art talent from competitors. This resulted in Penthouse Comix offering a per-page art rate to freelancers of $800, the largest ever established as a standard for comic book line art.

Penthouse Comix sections featured artwork by top comic book talent (Kevin Nowlan, Arthur Suydam, Adam Hughes, etc.). After the initial sections appeared, publisher Bob Guccione requested Penthouse Comix become its own stand alone magazine. The first issue of the 96-page stand alone Penthouse Comix appeared in the spring of 1994 and was an immediate success. It featured a number of characters originated by Weisfeld including Libby in the Lost World (co-created with artist Arthur Suydam), which became an international hit in foreign editions and prompted many additional installments of the series. Issues of American Penthouse Comix were published thereafter on a bi-monthly basis.

American Penthouse Comix published through 1998, producing thirty-five issues while inspiring Penthouse to publish two stand alone spinoff magazines (Penthouse Men's Adventure Comix and Penthouse Max). Penthouse Comix Magazine was licensed into many non-English markets. The Spanish edition of Penthouse Comix celebrated its 100th issue in 2010.

== Bad Magazine ==
In 1997, rap mogul Russell Simmons struck a deal to develop an “urban” spin-off of Mad Magazine with Time/Warner Publishing. Weisfeld was recruited to develop editorial for Russell Simmons Presents B.A.D Magazine and eventually became Managing Editor. Film designer Floyd Hughes was named Art Director. Writers and artists on the project included Deborah Gregory (who later created Disney's Cheetah Girls), Arthur Suydam (who went to later fame with Marvel Zombies), Walter Moore, and others. The project was developed with the consistent involvement of DC Comics President and Mad Magazine Publisher Jenette Kahn. Warner publishing eventually decided that BAD was too edgy for America's newsstands and The project was re-conceived as an animation project for HBO and then disappeared into development hell. During the period in which Bad Magazine advanced, members of the Bad team also contributed to the initial development of Warner's Green Lantern (film) and Bad partner and co-editor, Danny Simmons was appointed by The New York Art's Council as chief budget liaison to The New York State Governor's Office.

== Forbidden Zone Magazine ==
In 1999, Weisfeld was named Managing Editor of another glossy comics magazine, Forbidden Zone. The publication was designed to present new trademark characters and compete with Heavy Metal Magazine on the newsstand. Forbidden Zone published only one issue but this was packed with top comic book and fantasy art talent: Simon Bisley, Richard Corben, Arthur Suydam, Joe Linsner, Larry Stroman, John Cebollero and others. Before the publication of the first issue, Forbidden Zone Magazine parent Galaxy Entertainment sank into (tech-bubble) financial trouble, halting work on the second issue.

In 2004, Industry Of War, a comic book property co-created by Jordan Raskin and Horatio Weisfeld (back in 1993), was optioned for film by Alien, Total Recall, Minority Report producer Ronald Shusett. Image Comics later published a comic book series based on the property.

== Weisfeld/Simmons Entertainment ==
In 2005, Weisfeld and Danny Simmons (Producer of HBO's Def Poetry Jam and Brother of mogul Russell Simmons) formed Weisfeld/Simmons Entertainment. The company acquired media properties for live action and animation.

== Heavy Metal Magazine and later work ==
Starting in 2000, Weisfeld began a long-term relationship with Heavy metal Magazine, for whom he developed, wrote, and packaged several character driven properties and HM spin-off brands.

This began with the first installment of Joe In The Future, an ongoing series of short comic book stories written by Weisfeld (with Peter Koch) and illustrated by Trevor Von Eeden. The title character, Joe, wanders through a hostile futuristic environment while doggedly searching for cigarettes. The series received good reviews and (despite an infrequent schedule) developed a cult following. Heavy Metal began running Joe In The Future as a print series in 2001 after the initial episode appeared as 3-minute internet flash web animation. Heavy Metal editor Howard Jorofsky suggested Weisfeld allow the print magazine to run the comic book pages from which the webisode had been created. Weisfeld then followed with several additional Joe in the Future print installments for Heavy Metal. The nearly simultaneous appearance of Joe in the Future as both web-animation and print episodes makes the series an early example of web-initiated Transmedia storytelling. The most recent episode of the Joe in the Future print series appeared in the September 2010 Heavy Metal Magazine issue.

In 2007, Weisfeld began developing an illustrated text format for Heavy Metal magazine. Painted artwork for the initial segment (Slaughter of the Exterminators) was completed by film production designer Rafael Kayanan (Confessions of a Dangerous Mind, John Carter of Mars). The finished story appeared in the January 2009 issue of HM.

spread from illustrated text story Slaughter of the Exterminators by Horatio Weisfeld & Rafael Kayanan > Printed in Heavy Metal Magazine in 2008

During this period Kayanan was also involved in the design of Julie Taymor's Spider-Man: Turn Off the Dark. The Heavy Metal Magazine illustrated text format become the model for a spin-off project, Heavy Metal Pulp, a line of illustrated science fiction novels published by Tor books beginning in 2010.

Weisfeld's later "illustrated text" stories in Heavy Metal Magazine included the concluding chapter for the long running Joe In The Future series (this installment with painted art by The Pratt Institute's head of illustration, Floyd Hughes) and a black comedy, The Holo-Marketeer, about the grim and frightening world of a futuristic salesman (with artwork by Trevor Von Eeden). The stories show different views of a near future descending into violence and apocalyptic disorder.

In 2011, Weisfeld developed another addition to the Heavy Metal Magazine brand with the creation of Metal Media, a news and personality section featuring unseen film pre-production art, profiles, movie design reviews, and other material related to science fiction and fantasy entertainment. The initial section spotlighted the work of film pre-production artist Rafael Kayanan and discussed Kayanan's character designs for director Tarsem Singh's Immortals (2011 film).

In a January 2012 Metal Media article (The Zodiac Button), Weisfeld detailed his father's creation of a 1960s fad pin-on button (Melville Eats Blubber). This button was cited in extortion letters written by San Francisco's Zodiac Killer. In his letters to newspapers, The Zodiac Killer mangled the button's original phrase into "Melvin Eats Blubber," an apparent swipe at lawyer Melvin Belli while beginning demands for his own Zodiac Buttons. The Zodiac threatened more murders and to blow up a school bus if he did not see people wearing "Zodiac Buttons." As the article reported: ironically, although Weisfeld grew up knowing nothing of The Zodiac Killer, both the Zodiac (renamed Scorpio) and the school bus threat became elements of the 1971 film Dirty Harry which was a strong influence on Weisfeld's creative development as a teenager, this being years after the original "Melville Eats Blubber" button was produced by the Horatio Button Company - an entity named for Weisfeld when he was age 3 - and years before The Zodiac crimes would become news.
