= Lar Gand =

Fictional DC comics universe character

- Lar Gand as depicted in Legion of Super-Heroes (vol. 6) #4 (October 2010). Art by Jim Lee.

Publication information
- Publisher: DC Comics
- First appearance: Superboy #89 (June 1961)
- Created by: Robert Bernstein; George Papp (based upon Superboy by Jerry Siegel and Joe Shuster)

In-story information
- Full name: Lar Gand (Mon-El)
- Species: Daxamite
- Place of origin: Daxam (21st century)
- Team affiliations: Science Police (21st century); Justice League; Green Lantern Corps; Legion of Super-Heroes; Titans; Superman Family
- Notable aliases: Bob Cobb, Marvel Lad (aka "Legionnaire Lemon"), Valor, M'Onel, Champion, Jonathan Kent, Mike Matthews, Phantom King
- Abilities: See list: Superhuman strength, speed, stamina, agility, durability, and reflexes; Solar energy radiation absorption; Molecular acceleration; Longevity; Invulnerability; Flight; Superhuman vision; Electromagnetic spectrum vision; Telescopic vision; Microscopic vision; X-ray vision; Infrared vision; Ultraviolet vision; Heat vision; Thermal vision; Superhuman breath; Freezing breath; Wind breath; Super-Hearing; Genius-level intellect; Photographic memory; Indomitable will; Basic hand-to-hand combatant

Lar Gand, known mainly as Mon-El (and alternatively as Valor and M'Onel), is a superhero appearing in American comic books published by DC Comics, commonly in association with the Legion of Super-Heroes, Superboy, and Superman. Lar Gand is a Daxamite, an alien with similar abilities to that of a Kryptonian, but originating from another planet. The character has been reinterpreted over the years, but in all versions serves as a hero with abilities similar to those of Superman, sometimes serving as a substitute for him.

It's usually portrayed that Mon-El meets Superman in his adolescence, when he was still Superboy in Smallville, the two become friends and Lar Gand becomes a kind of older brother figure for Clark. Clark names Lar Gand with the Kryptonian name "Mon-El", giving him a name similar to that of a Kryptonian as a sign of the friendship and brotherhood that unites them both. Mon-El later succumbs to lead poisoning and is placed in the Phantom Zone to prevent the spread of the poison, from where he is released by the Legion of Super-Heroes in the future when a cure is found for his poisoning.

Mon-El appears in the second season of Supergirl, portrayed by Chris Wood. Additionally, Superman X, a character loosely based on Mon-El, appears in the animated series Legion of Super Heroes, voiced by Yuri Lowenthal.

== Publication history ==
A precursor to the Lar Gand character appeared in the story "Superman's Big Brother", in Superman #80 (February 1953). He was named Halk Kar, and had a logo-less costume almost identical to Superman's, but with the red and blue colors reversed. He was created by Otto Binder and artist Al Plastino.

Lar Gand first appeared in Superboy #89 and was created by Robert Bernstein and George Papp.

== Fictional character biography ==
=== Halk Kar ===
Halk Kar crash-lands on Earth in a rocketship and is rescued by Superman, who discovers that Halk Kar suffers from amnesia. Discovering that Halk Kar has a note from Jor-El (Superman's father) mentioning his son, Superman assumes that Halk Kar must not only be from his own planet Krypton, but he must be a son of Jor-El and thus also his own older brother.

Superman quickly realizes that Halk Kar is less powerful than he is and – instead of subjecting him to embarrassment over the fact that he may be weaker than his younger brother – opts to use his own powers to cover for Halk Kar's deficiencies. This plan backfires, as Halk Kar begins to assume a superior attitude to Superman and even begins to make romantic advances on Superman's girlfriend, Lois Lane.

Halk Kar recovers his memory and explains that he is from the planet Thoron, which is in the same star system as Krypton. Years ago, while on a pioneer voyage into space, he landed on Krypton with his damaged rocketship. There he met Jor-El, who explained that Krypton's destruction was imminent and repaired Halk Kar's rocketship, sending him away with the note which had a map from Krypton to Earth on it. Krypton exploded shortly afterward, causing Halk Kar to be put into suspended animation until he drifted to Earth to meet Superman, the grown-up son of Jor-El referred to in the note. Halk Kar returns to Thoron in his repaired rocketship, leaving Superman with the experience of briefly having had a brother.

=== Mon-El ===
The Halk Kar plot was reused in Superboy #89 (June 1961), in a story set during Superman's career as Superboy. The character's name was changed to Lar Gand, his homeworld was changed to Daxam, and he was made younger to roughly match Superboy's age. Unlike Halk Kar, Gand sustains amnesia after landing on Earth, with Superboy assuming that he is his brother and giving him the Kryptonian name Mon-El.

Mon-El is shown to be immune to kryptonite, which is radioactively poisonous to all Kryptonians. Believing that Mon-El has been deceiving him, Superboy tries to trick him with a fake kryptonite meteor made of lead, which turns out to be Mon-El's weakness. Furthermore, exposure to lead is irreversibly fatal to Daxamites, which Mon-El explains, having regained his memory. Guilt-ridden over inadvertently poisoning him, Superboy saves his life by sending him to the Phantom Zone, where he would be able to observe events in the outside world, but as a phantom would not age and his lead poisoning would not progress.

In the 30th century, Legion of Super-Heroes member Saturn Girl creates a temporary antidote to Mon-El's lead poisoning, allowing him to be released from the Phantom Zone for brief periods of time. In this capacity, he is considered an honorary Legionnaire. Brainiac 5 later creates a long-term antidote (which still requires periodic ingestion), and he becomes a full member. Mon-El is depicted one of the Legion's three most-powerful members along with Superboy and Ultra Boy, and serves two terms as leader. After a long romantic relationship, he and fellow Legionnaire Shadow Lass marry.

Mon-El is injured and dependent on life-support equipment during a battle with the Time Trapper, eventually dying from his injuries. The Time Trapper later revives Mon-El, hoping to use his body to preserve himself, but Mon-El kills him to prevent the Trapper from further manipulating events throughout history. The Trapper's role and powers are usurped by his underling Glorith.

=== Valor ===
Valor

Publication information
- Publisher: DC Comics
- Schedule: Monthly
- Format: Ongoing series
- Publication date: November 1992 – September 1994
- No. of issues: 23
- Main character: Lar Gand

Creative team
- Written by: Robert Loren Fleming; Mark Waid; Kurt Busiek
- Penciller(s): M. D. Bright; Jeffrey Moore; Paris Cullins; Colleen Doran
- Editor: KC Carlson

In the new "Glorithverse" reality, Lar Gand replaced Superboy as the Legion's inspiration, as Clark Kent's time as Superboy was written out of continuity. In the 20th century, Gand stopped the Dominators' planned invasion of Earth and freed thousands of humans who were experimented on by the Dominators and given metahuman powers. These humans went on to colonize many of the worlds that would join the United Planets. Gand was later placed in the Phantom Zone by Glorith to be rescued by the Legion in the 30th century.

After being freed, Gand briefly joins L.E.G.I.O.N., where Vril Dox cures his lead poisoning. He plays a significant part in the Eclipso: The Darkness Within crossover, in which Superman gives him the name "Valor". Valor received a self-titled solo series that lasted for 23 issues, centering on his exploits traveling across the universe with the artificial intelligence Babbage.

=== M'Onel ===
M'Onel. Art by Jeff Moy and W.C. Carani.

Lar Gand is reintroduced following the "Zero Hour" reboot, in Superboy (vol. 4) #17. He has sustained amnesia, but had vague memories of his time with L.E.G.I.O.N. and the events of his own series. He is tricked into fighting Superboy as the whole battle was being recorded for the purpose of betting on the winner. After seeing that Gand is deteriorating due to Vril Dox's anti-lead serum wearing off, Superboy places him in the Phantom Zone, where he was trapped for a thousand years before being released by the Legion and a time-traveling Superboy, and given an upgraded version of Dox's serum. To avoid the religious fervor his return would cause, the Legion keeps Gand's identity secret. Gand assumes the name M'Onel, which R. J. Brande claims to be Martian for "He Who Wanders".

=== 2004 "Threeboot" continuity ===
The character was introduced again following another reboot of Legion history in 2004. In Supergirl and the Legion of Super-Heroes #23 (December 2006), Saturn Girl senses a telepathic call for help, which turns out to be Mon-El in the Phantom Zone, suffering from 1,000 years of sensory deprivation and dying from lead poisoning. He is confused as to who put him in the Phantom Zone, but remembers the "S" symbol and attacks Supergirl. Brainiac 5 makes an anti-toxin for the lead poisoning using kryptonite, but this wears off, requiring him to be returned to the Phantom Zone. Final Crisis: Legion of 3 Worlds reveals that this future is not the future of New Earth but instead the future of Earth-Prime. The full actual past of this version of Mon-El is unknown, however he claimed to have known Supergirl and Superman in the past.

=== Post-"Infinite Crisis" ===
Mon-El in his costume honoring Superman. Art by Jamal Igle.

In post-"Infinite Crisis" continuity, Mon-El is the descendant of the Daxamite Bal Gand and an unnamed man who she had an affair with while visiting Earth. Gand returned to Daxam and gave birth there, but programmed her spaceship to return her son to Earth if necessary. Generations later, Lar Gand gives in to his suppressed instinct to escape the increasingly isolated Daxam and travel the stars, and is brought by his ancestor's ship to Earth.

February 2007's Action Comics Annual #10, gave a revised version of how Clark Kent met the character. It closely matches the 1960 story, but amnesiac Mon-El is poisoned when Clark tries to test whether he is Kryptonian using kryptonite, and the protective lead casing for the meteor both poisons him and restores his memories. He recalls that upon arriving at Earth, a sunspot storm ruptured his fuel cells, causing him to crash and lose his memory. Clark again uses a portal to the Phantom Zone to put Mon-El in stasis until his lead poisoning can be cured.

Superman later releases Mon-El from the Phantom Zone to save him from its collapse. Mon-El is cured of his lead poisoning by a cure left anonymously for him by the Legion. He adopts the human alias of Clark's cousin Jonathan Kent and acts as protector of Metropolis while Superman is operating on New Krypton. Mon-El also briefly joins the Science Police.

Following a battle with Atomic Skull, Mon-El is invited to join the Justice League of America by Doctor Light. After helping to save New Krypton and seeding the United Planets worlds in accordance with time-loop instructions from the Legion, Mon-El, now near death having become immune to the lead poisoning antidote, is returned to the Phantom Zone by Superman and Chameleon, where he remains until he is rescued by the Legion in the 31st century.

=== Post-"Infinite Crisis" Legion ===
Mon-El in his Green Lantern costume

The events of Infinite Crisis restore an analogue of the pre-Crisis Legion to continuity, including Mon-El.

In the Final Crisis: Legion of 3 Worlds miniseries, which follows after Superman and the Legion of Super-Heroes, Mon-El is rescued from the Phantom Zone by his teammates. Upon leaving the Zone, Mon-El once again suffers the effects of lead poisoning, but as in the past, is inoculated with an antidote created by Brainiac 5. He and Shadow Lass are sent on a mission to Oa to recruit Sodam Yat (the last Guardian of the Universe) into the war against Superboy-Prime and the Legion of Super-Villains. Mon-El forms a bond with the reluctant Yat as both a fellow Daxamite and as one who has outlived family and friends. Mon-El is later chosen to become a Green Lantern by Dyogene, a creature living inside the planet Oa.

=== The New 52 ===
In The New 52 continuity reboot, Gand appears as the field leader of the Legion of Super-Heroes. It is further revealed that this version, as the entire Legion, is possibly the original one from before the Flashpoint event as they are even aware of these reality-altering events.

In Doomsday Clock, Mon-El is erased from existence when Doctor Manhattan alters the timeline. However, he is restored when Superman convinces Manhattan to undo his actions.

Mon-El reappears in DC All In as the Phantom King, the ruler of the Phantom Zone. He is more based on the classic version of Lar Gand from Daxam, who crashed on Earth, was poisoned by lead, and placed in the Phantom Zone by Superboy (Clark Kent) in the 21st century. After his release and assisting in the capture of escapees of the Phantom Zone, Mon-El would later become the Phantom Zone's warden.

== Powers and abilities ==
Generally, the abilities of Lar Gand and other Daxamites are similar to those of Superman and other natives of the planet Krypton (super-strength; speed; flight; X-ray vision, heat vision, microscopic and telescopic vision powers; invulnerability; and super hearing). However, he is vulnerable to the inert element lead, rather than the radioactive element kryptonite.

== Other versions ==
During Brian Michael Bendis' Legion of Super-Heroes series, Mon-El is depicted as a descendant of Jon Kent (Superman's son) from the 31st century New Krypton, which significantly alters his classic origin and relationship to the Superman family. This character's history and the entire Legion continuity from that run are often considered to be from an alternate timeline or parallel Earth, distinct from the "Retroboot" Legion.

== In other media ==
=== Television ===
Chris Wood as Mon-El as he appears in Supergirl.

- Elements of Lar Gand are incorporated in a clone of Superman named Kell-El / Superman X, who appears in Legion of Super Heroes (2006), voiced by Yuri Lowenthal. According to series producer James Tucker, Superman X was created to fill Mon-El's role due to Warner Bros. executives believing the latter to be too similar to Superman.
- Mon-El appears in TV series set in the Arrowverse, portrayed by Chris Wood.
  - Primarily appearing in Supergirl, this version is a prince and son of Lar Gand (portrayed by Kevin Sorbo) and Rhea (portrayed by Teri Hatcher), though he initially believed that he was the prince's bodyguard. Introduced in the second season, Mon-El crash-lands on Earth and enters a coma sometime prior to the series. Upon awaking in the present, he battles Supergirl due in part to an ancient feud between Krypton and Daxam until she reveals that Daxam was destroyed alongside Krypton. After the Department of Extranormal Operations (DEO) release Mon-El into Supergirl's custody, she helps him integrate into Earth's society and use his powers for good. He adopts the alias Mike Matthews and eventually becomes a bartender at an alien bar. After Mon-El's parents come to Earth to retrieve him, he reluctantly goes with them due to Rhea's machinations until Lar Gand allows him to stay on Earth with Supergirl. Refusing to accept this, Rhea kills Lar Gand and attempts to conquer Earth, only to be foiled by Lena Luthor, who uses her brother Lex Luthor's equipment to lace Earth's atmosphere with a mixture of Kryptonite and lead to make the planet uninhabitable for Daxamites. Following the deaths of Rhea and several Daxamites, Mon-El leaves for deep space, where he enters a time portal, ends up in the 31st century, becomes a founding member of the Legion, and marries fellow Legionnaire Imra Ardeen over the course of seven years. After returning to the present to help Supergirl defeat Reign, Mon-El breaks up with Ardeen and brings Winn Schott to the 31st century to induct him into the Legion.
    - Additionally, two alternate timeline versions of Mon-El appear in the episode "It's a Super Life".
  - Mon-El appears in The Flash episode "Duet".

=== Film ===
- Mon-El makes a non-speaking cameo appearance in Justice League vs. the Fatal Five.
- Lar Gand appears in Legion of Super-Heroes (2023), voiced by Yuri Lowenthal. This version is a member of the Dark Circle who infiltrates the Legion Academy to seize the Miracle Machine, during which he adopted the Mon-El alias due to being a self-proclaimed fan of Kryptonian culture.

=== Video games ===
Mon-El appears as a character summon in Scribblenauts Unmasked: A DC Comics Adventure.
