= Penthouse Comix =

Comic book series

- Penthouse Comix #1 (1994)

Publication information
- Publisher: Penthouse
- Format: Ongoing series
- Publication date: May/June 1994 – July 1998; February/March 2024 – TBD
- No. of issues: 33 (original run); 7 (current run)

Creative team
- Written by: George Caragonne; Horatio Weisfeld
- Artist(s): Adam Hughes, Mark Beachum, Garry Leach, Kevin Nowlan, Mike Harris, Arthur Suydam, Jordan Raskin, Horacio Altuna, Milo Manara, Richard Corben, Tony Salmons, Bart Sears, Gray Morrow
- Editor(s): George Caragonne; Horatio Weisfeld; Dave Elliott; Nathan Yocum; Ryan Swanson

Penthouse Comix is an American mass-market, magazine-sized comic book, published by Penthouse from spring 1994 through July 1998 and 2024 to present. Founded and initially edited by George Caragonne and Horatio Weisfeld, it originally ran 32 issues plus one special edition. Foreign versions of Penthouse Comix remained in publication through 2011.

Penthouse Comix resumed publication in February 2024 and remains in publication as of 2026 under the name Penthouse Comics.

== Publication history ==
Penthouse Comix began as a series of short segments in Penthouse magazine. After three of these sections were printed (featuring artwork by Adam Hughes, Kevin Nowlan and Garry Leach), publisher Bob Guccione dictated that Penthouse Comix become its own stand-alone magazine, something which he envisioned competing in both US and European magazine markets. Guccione agreed to a budget that was designed to cherry pick art talent from both American comic book companies and non-US publishers and this resulted in Penthouse Comix offering a per-page rate among the highest ever paid to freelance comic book artists.

The first issue of the stand-alone Penthouse Comix was a 96-page, color, glossy magazine with cover price of $4.95 US. It appeared in spring 1994 and featured work by Adam Hughes, Mark Beachum, Garry Leach, Kevin Nowlan, Mike Harris, Arthur Suydam, Jordan Raskin, Horacio Altuna, and Milo Manara. Subsequent issues contained work by artists such as Roberto Baldazzini, Richard Corben, Tony Salmons, Bart Sears and Gray Morrow. The magazine's early issues avoided hardcore sex in favor of "soft-core erotica" and satiric humor that poked fun at various popular genres and popular culture.

Sold on newsstands, the periodical debuted in a squarebound magazine format 10¾" x 8¼" (27.5 cm x 20.7 cm). With issue #11, the size was reduced to 10½" x 8" (26.7 cm x 20.4 cm). From issue #26 to the end of its run, Penthouse Comix was published at standard modern comic-book size, with saddle-stitching, card-stock covers, and glossy interior pages. Issues #6-7 were published in both a magazine-size newsstand edition and a comic-book sized direct-market edition for sale in comic-book stores.

Two additional titles were later added to the line: The seven-issue Men's Adventure Comix (cover-titled Penthouse Men's Adventure Comix) (April/May 1995 – April/May 1996), and the three-issue (March/April 1995 – Oct./Nov. 1995) Omni Comix, the latter a companion to the science magazine Omni.

The reboot released in 2024 similarly features a 96-page, color, glossy magazine, with the more expensive version including a nude cover that is polybagged and contains a free poster that is folded and covers the front. The periodical also has the original squarebound magazine size of 10¾" x 8¼".

== Disintegration ==
After the magazine's successful start, editor-in-chief George Caragonne, who was developing a history of erratic behavior, purged managing editor Horatio Weisfeld during the production of Penthouse Comix #4. After Weisfeld's departure, some top-line artists began abandoning assignments, to be replaced by lesser talents, while overall quality and sales declined.

In 1995, Caragonne was accused of embezzlement by Penthouse, was fired, and later committed suicide at the New York Marriott Marquis hotel. According to a blog written by Caragonne's friend, television and comic book writer Mark Evanier, Caragonne had attempted to blame another employee for the financial issues that led to his death. This employee was later the one who had to identify Caragonne's body at the hotel, and later took their own life as well.

Penthouse then seized control of its comics-related publishing from the deceased Caragonne's packaging company, and installed Dave Elliott as editor. The Penthouse Comix line was then whittled to only the original magazine and Elliott edited the remainder of the magazine's run, largely printing sub-par material which had been contracted by Caragonne. Penthouse went bankrupt a few years later.

== Censorship ==
In June 1994, Canadian authorities warned that they would prohibit distribution of Penthouse Comics issue #2 (July/August 1994) because of "six panels of comics dealing with the subjugation of women and other sexual themes".

Some European countries also altered a story that featured Adolf Hitler (under laws which prohibited depiction of the Nazi leader). Editor Carragonne then went out of his way to inflame the issue by prominently featuring a swastika on the cover of Penthouse Comix #3. Although the cover had clearly been modeled on 1960s men's pulp magazine covers (which routinely featured Nazi villains), for foreign markets the swastika was altered to become an "X" and depictions of Hitler's head and swastika ring (in one story written by Caragonne) were replaced with a smiley face.

== Merchandising ==
In 1996, RC Cards issued a boxed set of Penthouse Comix trading cards. The 27 standard cards were accompanied by a chase card of Penthouse Pet Emerald Heart; a 1,000-limited-edition Alfonso Azpiri autograph card; and an Adam Hughes Hericane promotional card. The set included art by Hughes, Julie Bell, Ernie Colón, Glenn Fabry, Frank Frazetta, Mark Texeira, Boris Vallejo, and others.

== Foreign editions ==
Foreign versions of Penthouse Comix initially reprinted the material from the American magazine, but later began contracting for new material by non-American creators, such as Jordi Bernet and Enrique Sánchez Abulí. Foreign editions of Penthouse Comix continued publishing long after the American version ceased. Overseas editions of Penthouse Comix have been published in England, France, Greece, Italy, Germany, The Netherlands, New Zealand, Australia, South Africa, and Mexico. The Spanish edition of Penthouse Comix celebrated its 108th issue in 2011.
