= Trevor Von Eeden =

Guyanese-American comics artist (born 1959)

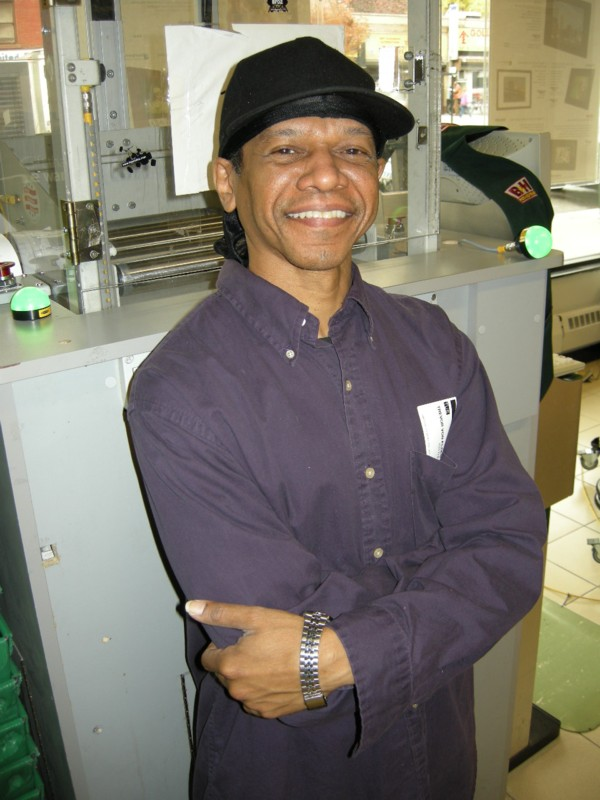
- Trevor Von Eeden
- Born: Trevor Von Eeden; July 24, 1959 (age 67) Guyana
- Areas: Artist, writer
- Notable works: Black Lightning; Batman; Green Arrow; Power Man and Iron Fist; The Original Johnson

Trevor Von Eeden (born July 24, 1959) is a Guyanese-American comics artist, actor and writer known for his work on such titles as Black Lightning, Batman, Green Arrow, Power Man and Iron Fist, and the biographical series The Original Johnson.

== Early life ==
Von Eeden was born in Guyana and moved to New York City when he was 11 years old. According to Von Eeden, he remembers drawing in his early teens in order to alleviate the boredom of junior high school, beginning with anatomical studies of faces and hands, which he says are the most difficult things to draw accurately. He was introduced to comics through the vast comic collection and encouragement of his best friend Al Simonson, who suggested he submit sample artwork to DC Comics. Von Eeden's influences included Neal Adams, Jack Kirby, John Buscema, and Curt Swan. He was also studying medicine at Columbia University.

== Career ==
Trevor Von Eeden was the first black artist that DC Comics had ever hired, one of the youngest they'd ever hired, and co-creator of their first original black superhero, Black Lightning (the black Green Lantern John Stewart) had debuted a year earlier.) His comic book career began at age 16, when DC Comics editor Jack C. Harris hired him to illustrate prototype assignments with the "Legion of Super-Heroes" and Weird War Tales. Soon after, Von Eeden was officially hired to design and draw the company's first African-American superhero to have his own title, Black Lightning.

About three years later, Von Eeden began to suspect he had gotten that job because of his skin color, which displeased him and resulted in his writing what he called a five-page mission statement that said "in detail exactly what I wanted to create — the kind of style I thought would express myself most effectively, while also telling a story in the most dramatic way possible. I wrote everything down that I could think of — the details, form, and purpose of the style of art that I'd wanted to create."

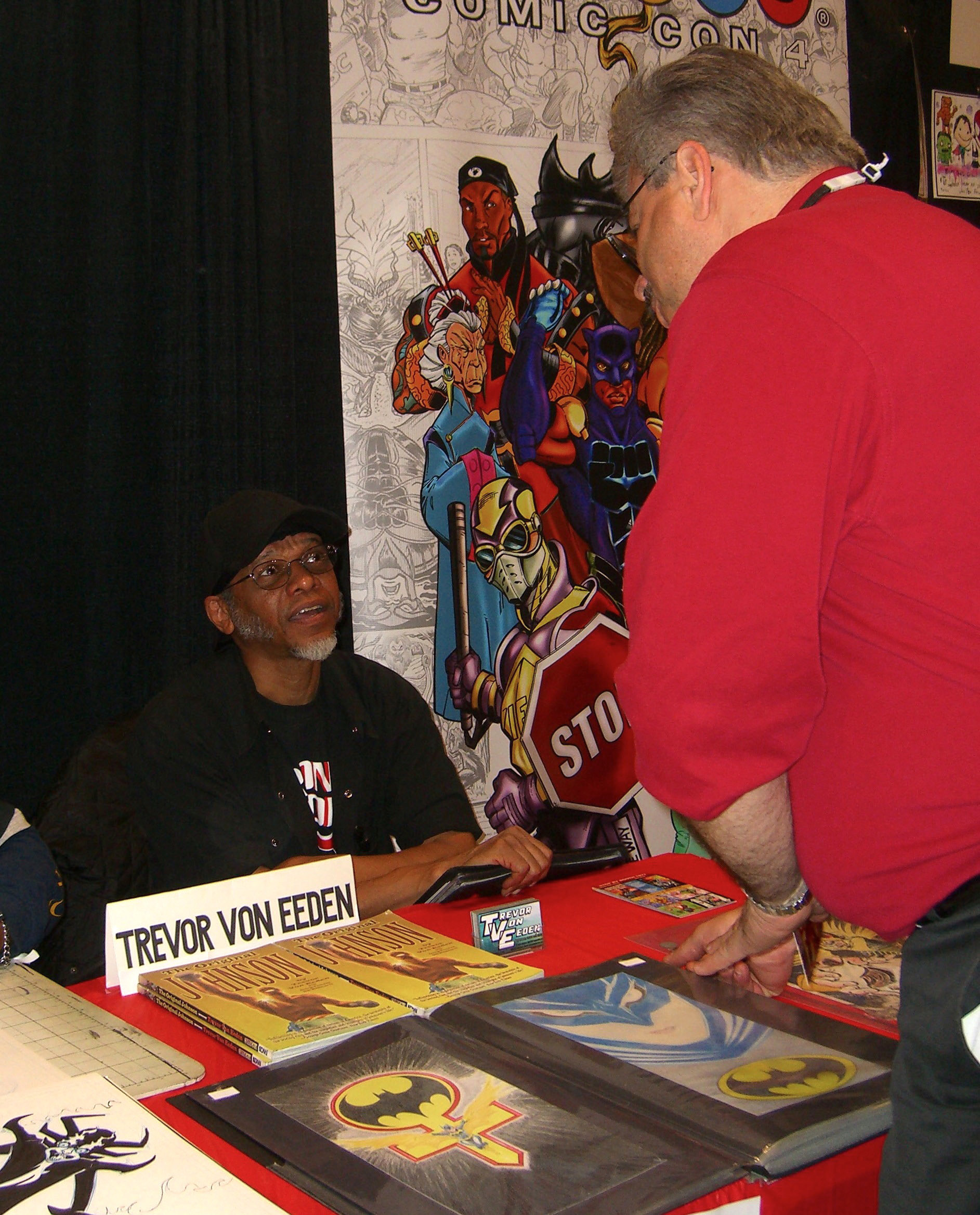
Von Eeden at the 2012 New York Comic Con

In 1977, he began drawing the "Green Arrow" backup feature in World's Finest Comics and co-created the Count Vertigo character with Gerry Conway in World's Finest Comics #251 (July 1978). Von Eeden recalled in a 2011 interview that he "worked for Neal [Adams] concurrent with my DC tenure—starting in 1978, until somewhere in the late '90s". He moved to Marvel Comics in 1979 and 1980 and pencilled Power Man and Iron Fist and Spider-Woman. His stint at Marvel Comics was cut short because, in his words, he was "fired by Jim Shooter, who’d told me specifically, when I’d first started there, to try and draw like Jack Kirby—and apparently wasn’t happy that I didn’t." He then returned to DC and once again drew the "Green Arrow" feature in World's Finest Comics and later in Detective Comics as well. In collaboration with writer Mike W. Barr, he crafted Batman Annual #8 (1982) and a Green Arrow miniseries. Von Eeden has noted that the Batman Annual is "the book I’m most proud of, in my 25 year career at DC Comics. I was able to ink it myself, and also got my girlfriend at the time, Lynn Varley, to colour it – her first job in comics." He and writer Jack C. Harris proposed to DC an all-female superteam named the Power Squad, but were turned down. In 1983, Von Eeden and writer Robert Loren Fleming created the DC series Thriller, an action-adventure story that allowed him room to experiment. Von Eeden left the series as of its eighth issue due to difficulties with DC Comics' management. He stated in a 2017 interview that he was "thrilled beyond measure" that Thriller is "the one job of my entire 41-year career that the fans have fondly and consistently remembered since it first appeared."

He was asked by Frank Miller to draw the "Batman: Year One" storyline but did not accept the offer.

"Venom", the fourth story arc in the Batman: Legends of the Dark Knight series, was drawn by Von Eeden, Russell Braun, and José Luis García-López. Von Eeden drew a Black Canary limited series (Nov. 1991-Feb. 1992) as well as an ongoing series featuring the character in 1992–1993. In a 2009 interview he stated that ''Black Canary, on the other hand, was done in one state of mind, from beginning to end, one of semi-interest, to tell you the truth. I didn't, and still don't, find her to be a particularly interesting character."

In 2001 Von Eeden returned to Batman, penciling the five-issue storyline "Grimm" in Batman: Legends of the Dark Knight #149–153. He also illustrated a series of short stories, "Joe In The Future", published in Heavy Metal #v25 #6 (Jan. 2002) and #v27 #5 (Nov. 2003)

In 2007 Von Eeden began writing and drawing The Original Johnson, a biography of the boxer Jack Johnson. The 242-page graphic novel was serialized in weekly online installments at ComicMix, and was completed in 2008. Print rights to the book were acquired by IDW Publishing, who issued the series as a two-volume set in 2009 and 2011. He has called this project "The other 'most satisfying' book of my career (aside from the Batman Annual #8) is The Original Johnson – the first book I’ve ever written and drawn."

He provided illustrations for the text story "The Holo-Marketeer" for Heavy Metal #v34 #9 (Jan. 2011) and designed and illustrated superhero comics produced for the National Hockey League by Stan Lee. He later drew four issues of Gateway Comics' Stalker.

== Awards and recognition ==
- 2010 Inkwell Awards Ambassador
- 2012 Inkpot Award

== Bibliography ==
=== Archie Comics ===
- Blue Ribbon Comics #2, 4 (1983–1984)
- The Fly #1 (1983)

=== Continuity Comics ===
- Armor #6 (1989)
- Megalith #4–5 (1990–1991)
- Toyboy #2–6 (1987–1988)
- Urth 4 #1–3 (1989–1990)

=== DC Comics ===
- Adventure Comics #486, 488–489 (Dial H for Hero) (1981–1982)
- Adventures of the Outsiders #37–38 (1986)
- Arak, Son of Thunder #15 (1982)
- Batman #341–343, 345–349 (Robin and Catwoman backups), 401, (1981-1986)
- Batman Annual #8 (1982)
- Batman and the Outsiders #15, 21 (1984–1985)
- Batman: Joker's Apprentice #1 (1999)
- Batman: Legends of the Dark Knight #16–20 (layouts), 105–106, 149–153 (1991–2002)
- Batman: Shadow of the Bat Annual #1 (1993)
- Black Canary #1–4 (1991–1992)
- Black Canary vol. 2 #1–7, 9–11 (1993)
- Black Lightning #1–11 (1977–1978)
- Blood Syndicate #1 (1993)
- Con Edison Presents JLA Starring Batman #3 (2002)
- Detective Comics #507 (Batman backup); #518–519 (Batgirl); #521–522, 558 (Green Arrow) (1981–1986)
- Elseworlds 80-Page Giant #1 (1999)
- Green Arrow #1–4 (1983)
- Green Arrow vol. 2 #25, Annual #5 (1989–1992)
- Green Lantern Corps Annual #2 (1986)
- House of Mystery #295, 301, 305, 316 (1981–1983)
- Justice League America #52 (1991)
- Legends of the DC Universe #26–27 (2000)
- Mystery in Space #112–114, 116 (1980–1981)
- Outsiders #5, 11, 24 (1986–1987)
- Secret Origins #41, 43, 48, Annual #3 (1989–1990)
- Secrets of Haunted House #25, 37, 42 (1980–1981)
- Thriller #1–8 (1983–1984)
- Time Warp #5 (1980)
- The Unexpected #210–213, 219 (1981–1982)
- Vigilante #14 (1985)
- Weird War Tales #100, 102, 107 (1981–1982)
- Who's Who in the DC Universe Update 1993 #2 (1993)
- Who's Who: The Definitive Directory of the DC Universe #5, 11, 15, 22–24 (1985–1987)
- World's Finest Comics #248–249, 252–253, 274–275 (Green Arrow and Black Canary team-up backup stories); #251, 254, 267 (Black Canary solo backup stories); #254–255, 263–266, 268–270, 272–273, 276–281 (Green Arrow solo backup stories); #287, 305, 307 (Superman and Batman team-up stories) (1977–1984)

==== DC Comics/United States Postal Service ====
- Celebrate the Century Super Heroes Stamp Album #5–9 (1999–2000)

==== Impact Comics ====
- Black Hood Annual #1 (1992)
- Comet Annual #1 (1992)
- The Fly Annual #1 (1992)
- Legend of the Shield Annual #1 (1992)

==== Paradox Press ====
- The Big Book of Bad #1 (1998)
- The Big Book of Little Criminals #1 (1996)
- The Big Book of the Weird Wild West #1 (1998)

=== Eureka Productions ===
- Graphic Classics African-American Classics #22 (2011)

=== Gateway Comics ===
- Stalker #1–4 (2012–2013)

=== IDW Publishing ===
- The Original Johnson #1–2 (2009–2011)

=== Marvel Comics ===
- Marvel Fanfare #2 (Fantastic Four); #3 (Hawkeye) (1982)
- Power Man and Iron Fist #56–59 (1979)
- Spider-Woman #23–24 (1980)
- X-Men Unlimited #34 (2002)

=== Metal Mammoth Inc. ===
- Heavy Metal #v25 #6, #v27 #5, #v34 #9 (2002–2011)

=== Pacific Comics ===
- Bold Adventure #1–2 (1983–1984)

== Filmography ==
Television roles
Year	Title	Role	Notes
2020	Black Lightning	Judge Von Eeden	Episode: "The Book of War: Chapter Three: Liberation"

Preceded by Sal Amendola	"Green Arrow" feature in World's Finest Comics artist 1977–1979	Succeeded by Dick Dillin
Preceded by Lee Elias	Power Man and Iron Fist artist 1979	Succeeded by Marie Severin
Preceded by Romeo Tanghal	"Green Arrow" feature in World's Finest Comics artist 1980–1982	Succeeded by Gil Kane
Preceded by n/a	Thriller artist 1983–1984	Succeeded by Alex Niño
Preceded by Paul Gulacy	Batman: Legends of the Dark Knight artist 1991	Succeeded by Bart Sears
Preceded by Paul Johnson	Batman: Legends of the Dark Knight artist 1998	Succeeded by Eddy Newell
Preceded by Barry Kitson	Batman: Legends of the Dark Knight artist 2002	Succeeded by Bill Reinhold
