= Irwin Weisfeld =

American writer and bookseller

Irwin Weisfeld (1932–1968) was an American writer and bookseller who was jailed in 1963 under obscenity laws for selling the 18th century erotic novel Fanny Hill. The case attracted national media attention and was one of the last in a series of First Amendment battles which made an impact throughout American culture.

Weisfeld went on to create a popular line of irreverent pin-on humor-buttons that became an infatuation with college students and an enduring emblem of 1960s American pop-culture.

== Arrest of a bookstore owner ==
In the early sixties, Irwin Weisfeld owned The Bookcase, a small retail book store on Lexington Avenue in midtown Manhattan. On September 4, 1963, a 16-year-old girl entered the store and purchased a copy of Fanny Hill, a 1748 erotic novel by John Cleland which had been at the object of censorship disputes over pornography since first publication. A reprint of the book had been newly published by the venerable and respected company G.P. Putnam's Sons. Weisfeld had promoted the fresh release in his store's window with a sign: "is now, in the new era of Publishing and Reader Freedom, at last available.. We feel that with the publication of this book almost all of the barriers are now down, and it is happening in our time."

The mother of the girl who had bought Fanny Hill from Weisfeld's store filed a criminal complaint. Weisfeld, and the clerk who had sold the book, John Downs, were both charged and convicted of violating Section 484-h of the New York State penal code. This incident took place soon after major court rulings which found that such controversial books as William S. Burroughs' Naked Lunch and Henry Miller's Tropic of Cancer were not obscene and could be sold to the public; so the arrest of Weisfeld and Downs occurred at a flashpoint in First Amendment law, coming after other major rulings on controversial literary works and during the era when comedian Lenny Bruce was repeatedly prosecuted for obscenity.

Weisfeld's case (New York v. Bookcase, Inc.) became a media event with ongoing coverage prominently featured in The New York Times, Time, and other mainstream news outlets.

== Prosecution prompted by powerful interests ==
It was soon reported that the purchase of the Fanny Hill from Weisfeld's store and complaint by the girl and her mother were orchestrated by Operation Yorkville, a New York–based interfaith pro-censorship group that was determined to stop distribution of the book, and had considerable influence and alliances with New York Mayor Robert F. Wagner Jr. (who was seeking to sanitize New York City's image before the 1964–1965 World's Fair), Cardinal Francis Spellman, and Norman Vincent Peale. After being released from jail, Weisfeld fought the charges in court while receiving crucial assistance from Barney Rosset, then owner of Grove Press (which had led a successful legal battle to publish D.H. Lawrence's Lady Chatterley's Lover, and was American publisher of Miller's Tropic of Cancer) and lawyers from G. P. Putnam's Sons.

== Court rulings ==
New York v. Bookcase, Inc. worked its way through three levels of the New York State judiciary. Meanwhile, at the prompting of Operation Yorkville, district attorneys from New York's five boroughs jointly argued that Fanny Hill was obscene under state law and could not be sold to anyone, minor or adult. For a time, the case against both Weisfeld and the book, Fanny Hill, meandered through the courts.

In 1964, to the outrage of Operation Yorkville and its allies & New York prosecutors, the guilty verdicts for Weisfeld and Downs were overturned; the New York appeals court concluded that NY obscenity laws were too vague, and the New York case against the book was thrown out.

In 1966, the U.S. Supreme Court, in deciding the case Memoirs v. Massachusetts, concluded that Fanny Hill was not obscene. These were the cumulation of a long line of court rulings that experts on constitutional law view as setting new standard for what is permissible (under First Amendment protection) and so led to changes in the nature of American media.

== Portrayal in media ==
In 1969, The Seven Minutes, a best-selling novel by Irving Wallace, featured a storyline (a small bookstore owner is prosecuted and persecuted by powerful and corrupt interests, after selling a provocative book) which seemed a salacious and much fictionalized version of Weisfeld's case. In 1971, 20th Century Fox released a movie version of The Seven Minutes, directed by Russ Meyer.

== Creation of hippie-era "kooky buttons" ==
Even as the court cases against Bookcase, Inc and Fanny Hill came to a close, Irwin Weisfeld found his small bookstore under pressure from large chain bookstores that had opened in midtown-Manhattan. During 1966, Weisfeld closed his bookstore and began to write and manufacture a line of joke pin-on buttons (or badges) that displaying mostly irreverent statements of Weisfeld's creation.

The project began as a bet between Weisfeld and close friend Martha Foley (Weisfeld had studied under Foley at Columbia University and she had included Weisfeld's short story "SAUL"—written as I.W. Vanetti—on her 1961 Roll of Honor in The Best American Short Stories 1962). For years Foley had encouraged Weisfeld to develop a project that could capitalize on his wit and biting use of language and some of Weisfeld's initial buttons were created from Foley's memories of Weisfeld's sly off the cuff remarks.

A Selection of Irwin Weisfeld's 1960s Buttons

After a good response from the New York literary scene, Weisfeld began to mass produce some of his joke buttons and sell them through ads in magazines. Weisfeld's buttons caught on with "smart-aleck" college students and hipsters across the America. Unlike "hippie" or "psychedelic" images that were featured on most 60s pin-on buttons, Weisfeld's buttons featured a design and fonts which showcased Weisfeld's irreverent and ironic copy writing. Among a large number of popular mid-1960s buttons Weisfeld created: "AMERICA: MURDER-MADNESS-SEX... and THE BEST DAMN ICE CREAM in the world", "DEATH IS NATURE'S WAY OF TELLING US TO SLOW DOWN","KILL FOR PEACE", "SEX: THE BREAKFAST OF CHAMPIONS", "if it moves, fondle it", "SHAKESPEARE ATE BACON", "HERMAN MELVILLE EATS BLUBBER","SUPPORT MENTAL HEALTH or I'LL KILL YOU","HAPPINESS IS A NICE WARM PUSSY", "ANARCHISTS UNITE", "PLEASE BE KIND: I'M ONLY A LITTLE GIRL IN A STRANGE TOWN", "ESKIMO POWER", "SAVE WATER: SHOWER WITH A FRIEND", "IF IT'S LIQUID, I DRINK IT", "GREAT SOCIETY: NEW LEECH ON LIFE", "PILLS, PLEASE", "STAMP OUT FIRST MARRIAGES", "FRODO LIVES", "WOMAN SHOULD BE OBSCENE AND NOT HEARD", "I'M MANIC DEPRESSIVE: BE WARNED", "GOD IS ALIVE: HE JUST DOESN'T WANT TO GET INVOLVED", "YOU, I DON'T LIKE", "YOU STINK!", "MARY POPPINS IS A JUNKIE", and "WHERE IS LEE HARVEY OSWALD NOW THAT WE REALLY NEED HIM?".

In the late 1960s Irwin Weisfeld's buttons were sometimes worn on air by TV comedy personalities and in later years Weisfeld's buttons sometimes appeared as visual reference to the 1960s, such as in Jeremy Kagan's 1975 film Katherine, in which a selection of Weisfeld's buttons (along with the Vietnam War, Fidel Castro, and student demonstrations) are part of a montage of 1967.

== Death ==
As the 1960s button fad peaked, Weisfeld designed what he hoped would become a new fad: a line of dart boards featuring the faces of various political figures. The dart boards were in early stages of marketing and distribution when Irwin Weisfeld died in 1968, at age 36, of lingering heart damage as a result of contracting rheumatic fever as a child.

== Zodiac Killer demands buttons ==
In a greeting card postmarked April 28, 1970, San Francisco's notorious Zodiac Killer made a threat to murder children unless the killer saw: ".. some nice Zodiac buttons wandering about town... Everyone else has these buttons like, (peace sign), black power, melvin eats bluber (sic)...Please no nasty ones like melvin's..". The button text of this Zodiac card is read aloud by actor Anthony Edwards in David Fincher's 2007 film Zodiac over a montage at 61 mins.

In January 2012, an article in Heavy Metal magazine detailed the exact connection between the Zodiac's button request and Weisfeld's buttons: the first two buttons referenced by Zodiac in the card, "(peace sign)" & "Black Power", were ubiquitous popular slogan buttons made and sold by Weisfeld's company, while "Melvin Eats Bluber" is Zodiac's particular distortion of Irwin Weisfeld's original button creation, "Melville Eats Blubber". (an otherwise irreverent comment regarding the author of Moby Dick). In switching "Melville" to "Melvin", the Zodiac Killer twisted Weisfeld's copy to mock portly San Francisco native Melvin Belli, a legal and media personality with whom The Zodiac had communicated and seemingly become annoyed. While a popular film like 1971's Dirty Harry presents a distorted version of The Zodiac Killer (renamed Scorpio in Dirty Harry) as a money hungry extortionist, buttons were (aside demanding his communications be printed in the papers) the real Zodiac Killer's only demand.

Subsequent Zodiac letters included increasingly frustrated demands for "Zodiac Buttons". Some letters threatened Paul Avery, a flamboyant crime reporter at the San Francisco Chronicle with whom the Killer had apparently become disenchanted. While no buttons were made to satisfy the Zodiac Killer's particular demands for his own "Zodiac Button", staff at the San Francisco Chronicle (including Avery) begin wearing a button that read: "I AM NOT PAUL AVERY".

== See also ==
- Horatio Weisfeld, his son
