= Bart Sears =

American comic book artist

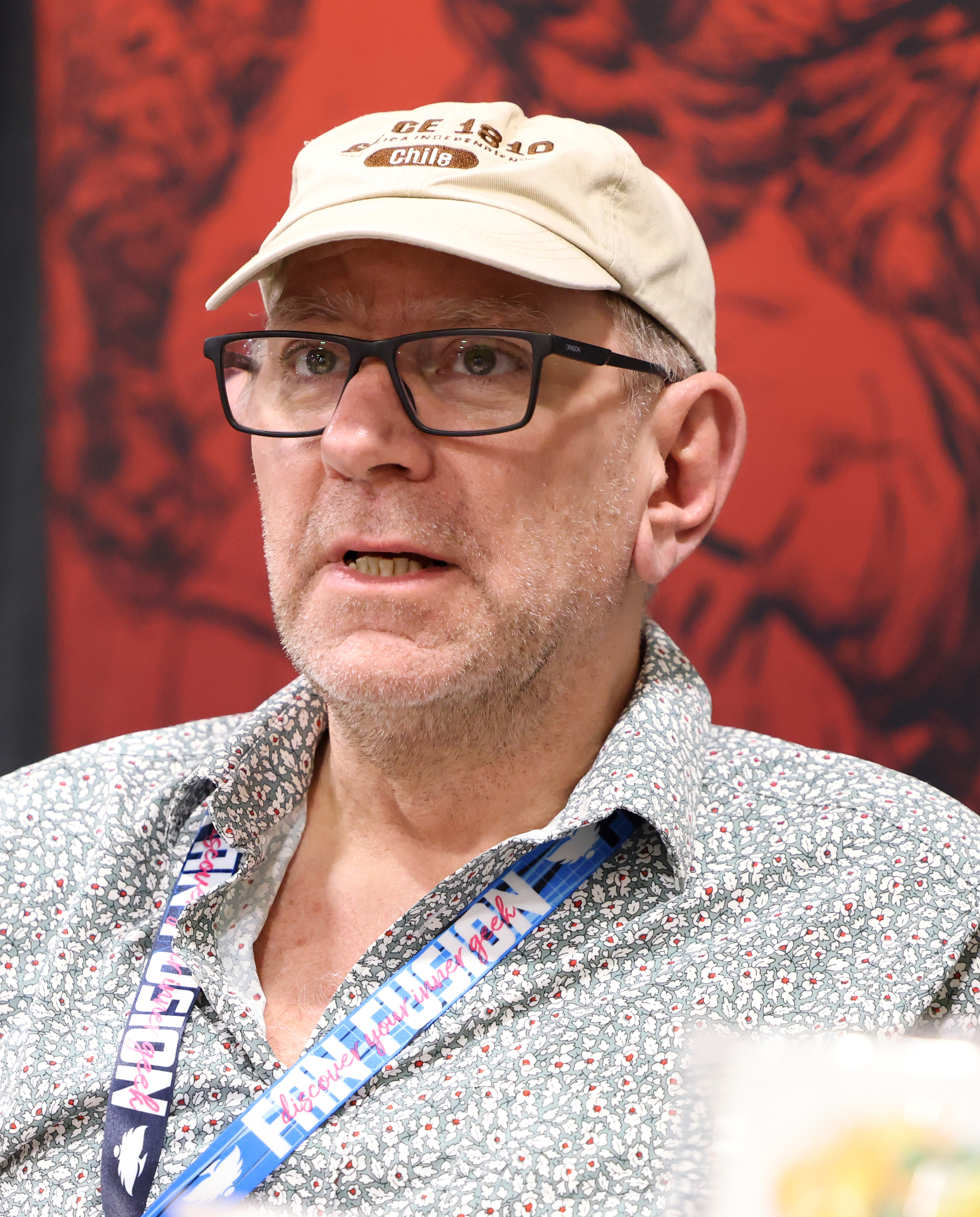
- Sears in 2025
- Born: Bart Whitman Sears; December 17, 1963 (age 62) Ithaca, New York, U.S.
- Areas: Writer, Penciller, Publisher
- Pseudonym: Wittman
- Notable works: Justice League Europe; Ominous Press; X-O Manowar; Wizard's Brutes & Babes Tutorials

Bart Whitman Sears (born 1963) is an American comics artist, toy and packaging designer and author, known for his work on such books as Justice League Europe, Legends of the Dark Knight, X-O Manowar, Turok, Violator, The Helm, and The Masters.

== Career ==
In addition to comic art, Sears has worked as a designer of action figures and packaging, most notably for Hasbro on the C.O.P.S., G.I. Joe, and World Wrestling Federation toy lines and on many of the early X-Men action figures for ToyBiz.

Sears ran his own comic company briefly in 1994, called Ominous Press, which published three creator owned titles. In 2000, he joined CrossGen as an artist, and was later promoted to act as one of the company's art directors. After the collapse of CrossGen, Sears returned to work at Marvel Comics on books like Captain America and the Falcon, Sabretooth: Open Season, and Weapon X: Days of Future Now, before returning to DC Comics to work on a relaunch of Warlord. Sears worked in-house for Heatwave Interactive (2008–2010) creating concept art and story for several properties, as well as developing in-game assets for multiple games across various platforms. He then launched Ominous Studios, Inc, through which he created and directed the production of concept art and assets for game developers and studios.

Sears has also taught at The Kubert School and is the author of the monthly series Brutes and Babes that was featured in early issues of Wizard Magazine, as well as the how-to book Drawing Powerful Comics: Volume One.

Sears continues to create art and content for various projects.
