= Bucky O'Hare (disambiguation) =

Bucky O'Hare is a fictional character and the hero of comic books published by Continuity Comics.

Bucky O'Hare may also refer to:

- Bucky O'Hare (arcade game), a 1992 arcade game
- Bucky O'Hare (NES video game), a 1992 video game
- Bucky O'Hare and the Toad Wars!, an animated television show based on the comic book character
