= Barack Obama in comics =

From The Amazing Spider-Man No. 583 Variant (January 2009) Art by Phil Jimenez & Barry Kitson.

Barack Obama has appeared as a character in comic books published by a number of publishing companies, sometimes appearing as a realistic fictionalized version of himself and sometimes as a spoof.

== Publication history ==
Obama made his first appearance as a comic book character in July 2007 in Licensable BearTM No. 4 by Nat Gertler and Lonny Chant, where he appeared as a U.S. Senator. The comic only had a print-run of 1,050 issues. A year later, in September 2008, Obama appeared in Erik Larsen’s Savage Dragon No. 137. This issue featured a variant cover which showed Obama with the Savage Dragon, who proclaims that he is endorsing him for president. The issue sold out four print runs. A month later, the comic was followed up by Presidential Material: Barack Obama by Jeff Mariotte and in November 2008 with Obama: The Comic Book by Rod Espinosa.

In November 2008, two things led to an explosion in popularity of the Obama comic book character. One of Obama's advisers gave an interview to journalist Jon Swaine of The Daily Telegraph titled, "Barack Obama: The 50 facts you might not know." In the interview, it emerged that Obama collects "Spider-Man and Conan the Barbarian." Then later that month, on November 4, 2008, Obama became the first African-American to be elected President of the United States.

When Marvel Comics discovered the president-elect was an avid collector of Spider-Man comics, they decided to have Obama the comic book character be put on the cover of their The Amazing Spider-Man No. 583 (January 2009), for the story "Spidey Meets the President!" written by Zeb Wells. This particular release proved extremely popular and sold out in a matter of minutes. A day after the release, the edition was sold for $300 on eBay. Prior to the Spider-Man story, the president-elect was featured in Secret Invasion #8; this is the first appearance of president-elect Barack Obama in a Marvel comic.

Obama the comic book character has been put on the cover and pages of many other comics including Savage Dragon No. 145 (February 2008) by Erik Larsen and Youngblood No. 8 (February 2008) by Rob Liefeld. The Savage Dragon No. 145 had a special edition variant only offered at the WonderCon 2009 in San Francisco in March 2009 (only 1,500 were produced). On the cover, Barack Obama can be seen holding an American flag and punching Osama Bin Laden in the face.

Barack Obama appears as a major character in the sixth volume of Bomb Queen by Jimmie Robinson, tentatively entitled Bomb Queen vs. Obama (later as Oh-BOMB-Ah! and Time Bomb), following his cameo in the epilogue of the previous miniseries The Divine Comedy (Bombastic), seeing the supervillain come to odds with the President who "would not stand for a place like Bomb Queen's city"; Robinson would note that "I personally support the President, I'm glad he's in office, I voted for him. However, I have to write for my character – and she hates Obama. Just like Stephen King or Clive Barker, who write horrific characters and do not identify with them, so do I, or any writer worth their salt. So this volume was another test for me as a writer to go outside of my personal beliefs and script a story from a villain's perspective," "fighting him on the public front".

Barack Obama is the subject of graphic novel Barack Hussein Obama by Steven Weissman. In this, President Obama and his cast of characters (Secretary Clinton, VP Joe Biden, his family) experience life in a parallel universe.

Barack Obama has also appeared in Archie Comics Veronica #199, and Archie #616 and #617.

President Obama was in the Flashpoint Storyline of DC comics of 2011. He discusses the earth members of The Green Lantern Corp with Amanda Waller.

== Comics featuring Barack Obama ==
- MAD Magazine #479 Publisher – Mad (magazine), Release – July 2007
- Captain America #41, Publisher – Marvel Comics, Writer – Ed Brubaker, Artists – Steve Epting, Rick Magyar, Release – October 2008
- Secret Invasion #8, Publisher – Marvel Comics, Writer – Brian Michael Bendis, Artists – Leinil Francis Yu, Mark Morales, Laura Martin, Release – December 2008
- Barack Hussein Obama Book 1, Publisher – Fantagraphics Books, Inc., Writer/Artist – Steven Weissman, Release – November 2012
- Licensable BearTM No. 4, Publisher – About Comics, Writer – Nat Gertler, Artist – Lonny Chant, Release – July 2007
- Savage Dragon No. 137, Publisher – Image Comics, Writer – Erik Larsen, Artist – Erik Larsen, Release – September 2008
- Presidential Material: Barack Obama, Publisher – IDW Publishing, Writer – Jeff Mariotte, Artists – Tom Morgan, Release – October 2008
- Obama: The Comic Book, Publisher – Antarctic Press, Writer – Rod Espinosa, Artist – Chris Allen, Release – November 2008
- The Amazing Spider-Man #583: "Spidey Meets the President!", Publisher – Marvel Comics, Writer – Zeb Wells, Artists – Barry Kitson, Mark Farmer, Dean White, Cory Petit, Release – January 2009
- 08: A Graphic Diary of the Campaign Trail, Publisher – Three Rivers Press, Writer – Michael Crowley, Artist – Dan Goldman, Release – January 2009
- Bomb Queen V – The Divine Comedy #6 Publisher – Image Comics, Writer/Artist – Jimmie Robinson, Release – January 2009
- Savage Dragon No. 145, Publisher – Image Comics, Writer – Erik Larsen, Artist – Erik Larsen, Release – February 2009
- Youngblood No. 8, Publisher – Image Comics, Writer – Rob Liefeld, Artist – Rob Liefeld, Release – February 2009
- Thunderbolts #128–129, Publisher – Marvel Comics, Writer – Andy Diggle, Artist – Roberto De La Torre, Release – March–April 2009
- Female Force: Michelle Obama, Publisher – Bluewater Productions, Writer – Neal Bailey, Artist – Ryan Howe, Release – April 2009
- Drafted: 100 Days one shot, Publisher – Devil's Due Publishing, Writer – Mark Powers, Release – June 2009
- Barack the Barbarian, Publisher – Devil's Due Publishing, Writer – Larry Hama, Artist – Christopher Schons, Release – June 2009
- President Evil, Publisher – Antarctic Press, Writer and artist – David Hutchison, Release – July 2009
- Political Power: Barack Obama, Publisher – Bluewater Productions, Writer – Chris Ward, Artist – Azim Akberali, Release – September 2009
- Army of Darkness: Ash Saves Obama, Publisher – Dynamite Entertainment, Writer – Elliott Serrano, Artist – Ariel Rey Padilla, Release – September 2009
- Air Gear , Publisher – Weekly Shōnen Jump, Writer – Oh! great, Artist – Oh! great, Release – Chapter 227
- Gamble Fish, Publisher: Weekly Shonen Champion, Writer: Aoyama Hiromi, Release: March 2007
- Bomb Queen VI – Oh-BOMB-Ah! Publisher – Image Comics, Writer/Artist – Jimmie Robinson, Release – September 2009 – January 2011
- Godzilla: Kingdom of Monsters No. 1, Publisher – IDW Publishing, Writer – Eric Powell, Artist – Phil Hester, Release – March 2011
- Veronica #199
- Archie #616 and #617

== See also ==
- Depictions of Barack Obama
