= Barack the Barbarian =

American comic series

- Cover of Barack the Barbarian 1 (June 2009 ), art by Tim Seeley and Rachelle Rosenberg

Publication information
- Publisher: Devil's Due Publishing
- Schedule: Irregular
- Format: Limited series
- Genre: Fantasy
- Publication date: June 2009 – present
- No. of issues: 5
- Main character: Barack Obama

Creative team
- Written by: Larry Hama
- Artist: Christopher Schons
- Letterer: Chris Crank
- Colorist: Rachelle Rosenberg
- Editor: Evan Sult

Collected editions
- Volume 1: ISBN 1-934692-79-4

Barack the Barbarian is a comic book series published by Devil's Due Publishing beginning in June 2009. It was written by Larry Hama, with art by Christopher Schons.

Barack the Barbarian originally appeared in a four-issue mini-series. The story features the 44th president of the United States, Barack Obama as a Conan the Barbarian-style figure. It also features other politicians like Sarah Palin, George W. Bush, and Dick Cheney in fictional roles.

The series was followed by a one-shot, The Fall of Red Sarah.

== Publication history ==
In November 2008, one of Obama's advisers gave an interview to journalist Jon Swaine of The Daily Telegraph titled, "Barack Obama: The 50 facts you might not know". In the interview, it emerged that Obama collects Conan the Barbarian.

The idea for the series originated with Devil's Due publisher Josh Blaylock who explained that "We didn't want to be completely slapsticky. It is definitely partly a gimmick, but we wanted to do something clever with [the Obama comics trend]." He contacted Larry Hama with his idea for a series called Obama the Barbarian, and Hama described how the idea developed during the course of the phonecall:

First off, you should change it to Barack the Barbarian, and second, I'm not interested in writing a Mad Magazine style parody and that it would have to be more in line with the more polemical stuff of Swift, Twain and Voltaire (not that I can pull off anything like they could,) and third, that my own leanings are towards Barack and that would be reflected in what I write – and Josh said 'fine'.

The writer has said it is more than just a political satire: "I just think of it as sword and sorcery, only the characters look really familiar."

== Collected editions ==
The comic books are being collected into a trade paperback:

- Barack the Barbarian Volume 1: Quest for the Treasure of Stimuli (144 pages, December 2009, ISBN 1-934692-79-4)

== See also ==
- Barack Obama in comics
