= Echo of Futurepast =

American comic book

Publication information
- Publisher: Continuity Comics
- Publication date: 1984 – January 1986
- No. of issues: 9

Creative team
- Written by: List: Neal Adams Ricardo Barreiro Goran Delić Lindley Farley Carlos Giménez Larry Hama Stephano Negrini Enea Riboldi Tim Ryan Enrique Sánchez Abulí Arthur Suydam Jean Teulé
- Artist: List: Neal Adams Jordi Bernet Juan Giménez Michael Golden William Jungkuntz Louis Mitchell Alex Toth
- Letterer: List: Ken Bruzenak
- Colorist: List: Cory Adams Polly Law Arthur Suydam Sherri Wolfgang

Echo of Futurepast is an American comic book/magazine series that was published by Continuity Comics from 1984 to 1986. It featured the comic book debut of Bucky O'Hare and the color debut of Torpedo. Aimed at the same audience as Heavy Metal and Epic Illustrated, it carried a notice that it was recommended for mature audiences due to nudity, sexuality, and violence. Each issue featured stories by multiple authors, with a mix of original content and reprints and translations of stories featured in foreign comics anthologies.

== Publication history ==
First published in 1984, the first two issues did not include a cover date. The series listed itself as being published bi-monthly starting in issue #3, and monthly starting in issue #9. However, cover dates had gaps of as much as four months between issues as the series suffered from Continuity Comics' notorious inability to publish on schedule.

== Featured stories ==
Eleven stories were featured in Echo of Futurepast:

- AE-35 (issues #6-9): Story by Tim Ryan, art by William Jungkuntz and Neal Adams. Had been scheduled to be continued in issue #10.
- Bucky O'Hare (issues #1-6): Created and written by Larry Hama, illustrated by Michael Golden. Expanded and reprinted in Bucky O'Hare beginning in 1984, and adapted as a television series, toy line, and video games.
- The Damned City (issues #7-9): Story by Ricardo Barreiro, art by Juan Giménez. Had been scheduled to be continued in issue #10.
- Frankenstein-Count Dracula-Werewolf (issues #1-5): by Neal Adams. Previously published as a record and comic book combination by Power Records.
- Hom (issues #2-5): by Carlos Giménez
- Mudwogs (issues #1-5): by Arthur Suydam. Some content had previously been published in Heavy Metal.
- Star Rat (issue #8): by Goran Delić
- Tippie Toe Jones (issues #1, 5–9): Created and written by Lindley Farley, illustrated by Louis Mitchell. Had been scheduled to be continued in issue #10.
- Torpedo (issues #6-9): Story by Enrique Sánchez Abulí, art by Alex Toth/Jordi Bernet. Previously published without color in Spanish magazine Creepy. Had been scheduled to be continued in issue #10.
- Tuxedo Junction (issue #2): by Stephano Negrini and Enea Riboldi
- Virus (issues #1, 3–4, 6–7): by Jean Teulé

== See also ==
- Comics anthology
