= Bucky O'Hare and the Toad Wars! =

1991 American-French TV series

- Genre: Action-adventure
- Based on: Bucky O'Hare by: Larry Hama; Michael Golden
- Developed by: Christy Marx
- Directed by: Karen Peterson
- Starring: Jason Michas; Shane Meier; Long John Baldry; Richard Newman; Terry Klassen; Scott McNeil; Dale Wilson; Margot Pinvidic; Sam Khouth; Jay Brazeau; Garry Chalk
- Opening theme: Doug Katsaros
- Countries of origin: United States; France
- No. of episodes: 13

Production
- Executive producers: Joe Taritero; Neal Adams; Marylin Adams; Marty Abrams; Anthony Gentile; John Gentile; Joe Bacal; Tom Griffin; CJ Kettler
- Producers: Boyd Kirkland; Frank Paur; Roger Slifer
- Running time: 30 minutes
- Production companies: Sunbow Productions; Abrams/Gentile Entertainment; Continuity Comics; IDDH; Marvel Productions

Original release
- Network: First-run syndication (U.S.)
- Release: September 8 – December 1, 1991

Bucky O'Hare and the Toad Wars! (also known as Bucky O'Hare and the Toad Menace in Canada and Bucky O'Hare in the United Kingdom) is an animated series created by Sunbow Productions, Abrams/Gentile Entertainment, Continuity Comics and the French company IDDH, co-produced by Marvel Productions and distributed by Hasbro's subsidiary Claster Television. It is based on the cult comic Bucky O'Hare, and animated by AKOM.

It first aired in the United States in 1991, and in the United Kingdom on the BBC as part of its Children's BBC programming strand in 1992. The show was made with the intention of promoting the new Bucky O'Hare toy line. When plans for that fell through, the series was abruptly cancelled after only 13 episodes.

== Cast ==
- Long John Baldry as Komplex, Pit Stop Pete
- Jay Brazeau as Toad Air Marshall, Secretary General, Mentor, Rumble Bee
- Garry Chalk as Commander Dogstar, Al Negator, Quentin, MC, Major Bottlenose, Dan, Blackbeak, Kamikaze Kamo, General Baboon, Total Terror Toad, Digger McSquint, Wolf, Tri-Bot #1
- Doc Harris as Toad TV, Harman, Fake Pirate
- Simon Kendall as Security Toad #3, Bridge Toad #1
- Sam Khouth as A.F.C. Blinky, Frix, Doug, Jeff, Croakley, Tri-Bot #3
- Terry Klassen as Rat Produce Merchant, Scarbill, The Newt, Toad Crew Member
- Scott McNeil as Dead-Eye Duck, Frax, David, Tinker, Larry, Wartimer, Dexter, Mostly-Mouth Robot-A, Grebb, Sly Lee-Zard, False Bucky
- Shane Meier as Willy DuWitt
- Jason Michas as Bucky O'Hare
- Richard Newman as Toadborg, Wolf, Mostly-Mouth Robot-B, Tri-Bot #2
- Pauline Newstone as Lanelle
- Doug Parker as Andy Phibian, Bruiser’s Mother
- David Steele as Toad-Mammal, Toad Cowboy
- Margot Pinvidic as Jenny, Verruca, Sunshine, Mother Aldebaran, Mimi LaFloo, Aunt Iris, Susie, Roona, Toadanne, Felicia, High Artificer, T.J.
- Dale Wilson as Bruiser, Bruce, Guardroid, Announcer, Captain Smada, Bob, Hopkins, Redjack, Samurai Commander, Rumble Bee

== Differences from the comics ==
Most of the ideas from the comic book were used for the cartoon, with several major differences:

- The parallel universe in which the story takes place is called "Aniverse".
- Willy DuWitt can travel freely between Earth and the Aniverse instead of being stranded there.
- Bruce is transported into another dimension instead of being killed.
- The Toad Empire are willingly following KOMPLEX instead of brainwashed.
- Deadeye has a Southern accent instead of Scottish accent.
- The nigh-omnipotent mouse is nowhere to be seen.
- Jenny reveals her psionic powers to Willy DuWitt.

The cartoon explored more of the Aniverse and followed a loose unifying arc, with Bucky's home planet of Warren being captured by the toads in the season premiere and liberated in the finale (which was co-written by Neal Adams).

== Characters ==
Bucky and his crew are members of the S.P.A.C.E. organization, which stands for Sentient Protoplasm Against Colonial Encroachment.

- Bucky O'Hare (voiced by Jason Michas) is a green hare from the planet Warren who captains a S.P.A.C.E. frigate named The Righteous Indignation. His crew consists of:
- Jenny (voiced by Margot Pinvidic) is the first mate and pilot, a cat from the planet Aldebaran with mysterious magical and psionic powers common to females of her species. They include telepathy, astral projection, energy blasts, and healing. Because of the sacred precepts of Alderbaran, she keeps these powers secret from the other members of the crew, with the exception of Willy, for whom she has overt maternal affections.
- Bruce (voiced by Dale Wilson) is Bruiser's older brother and a Betelgeusian Berserker Baboon who served as the Righteous Indignation's engineer. He vanished into another dimension when the ship's photon accelerator malfunctioned during battle.
- Willy DuWitt (voiced by Shane Meier) is an engineer and a preteen boy from San Francisco who enters the Aniverse via a portal between the ship's photon accelerator and his own accelerator at home. He replaced Bruce, the former engineer, who was killed (or in the franchise's terms, had "attained oneness with the Aniverse"). Later, Willy became stranded in the Aniverse when his parents turned off the photon accelerator back in his room. Bucky and his crew decide to keep Willy a secret from the S.P.A.C.E organization and the Toads.
- Dead-Eye Duck (voiced by Scott McNeil) is a gunner and a four-armed former space pirate duck from Kanopis III. He is missing an eye, and is impatient and violent, preferring to let his four laser pistols do the talking for him. Unlike the comics where he has a Scottish accent, he has an American accent.
- AFC Blinky (voiced by Sam Khouth) is an advanced AFC ("Android" First Class) with only one eye that uses the phrase "Calamity and woe!" to identify problem situations for Bucky and his crew-mates.

The members of the Toad Empire introduced are as follows:

- KOMPLEX (voiced by Long John Baldry) is an undisputed ruler of the Toad Empire and a computer program who was designed to run the consumerist toad culture but instead took it over and militarized it. Its name, in toad language, is an anagram for 'Feed me'.
- Toad Air Marshall (voiced by Jay Brazeau) is one of KOMPLEX's foremost commanders, with a uniform adorned with medals and a face covered in warts.
- Toad Borg (voiced by Richard Newman) is a large, purple cyborg second-in-command under KOMPLEX.
- Storm Toads are a mindless toad soldiers who serve as the primary attack force for the Empire.

=== Characters that only appeared in the animated series ===
Almost all the characters listed above are both from the comic book and the cartoon. Most of the new ones that were introduced are listed below.

- Bruiser (voiced by Dale Wilson) is Bruce's younger brother and a Betelgeusian Berserker Baboon who joins Bucky's team as space marine on the Righteous Indignation. He, like all berserker baboons, scares the toads out of their wits and loves to beat them up. He is dimwitted but well-meaning, and has great respect for Willy.
- Commander Dogstar (voiced by Garry Chalk) is Bucky's ally, who is captain of The Indefatigable, another frigate fighting against the toads.
- Mimi LaFloo (voiced by Margot Pinvidic) is a fox who was originally a captive of the toads. She is rescued by Bucky and goes on to command her own mammal frigate, The Screaming Mimi.
- Frix and Frax (voiced by Terry Klassen and Scott McNeil) are Air Marshal's two bumbling subordinates.
- Al Negator (voiced by Garry Chalk) is a sleazasaur (bipedal crocodile) spy and mercenary frequently hired by the Air Marshal, though he is always demanding large payments in Simoleans (the Aniverse's currency) for his services. He dresses and speaks in a manner consistent to the cajun people.

== Episode list ==
| No. | Title | Written by | Original release date | Prod. code |
|---|---|---|---|---|
| 1 | "War of the Warts (Part 1)" | Christy Marx | September 8, 1991 | 101 |
Bucky O'Hare and the Righteous Indignation crew learn that the Toad Empire has taken over his homeworld Warren and must travel there to investigate. Meanwhile, an Earth boy named Willy DeWitt enters Bucky's universe using an experimental device.
| 2 | "A Fistful of Simoleans (Part 2)" | Christy Marx | September 15, 1991 | 102 |
Willy joins Bucky's crew to Planet Warren where they find information relating to the world's recent climate change. The cause is revealed to be a new weapon called the Climate Converter. Meanwhile, a spy is hired by the Toad Empire to gain access through the Aniverse capital, Planet Genus.
| 3 | "The Good, the Bad and the Warty (Part 3)" | Christy Marx | September 22, 1991 | 103 |
It is a race against time as the Righteous Indignation crew infiltrate a Toad Mothership to retrieve Planet Genus's access codes. The only things standing in their way are gun-for-hire Al Negator and the deadly Toadborg.
| 4 | "Home, Swampy Home" | Christy Marx | September 29, 1991 | 104 |
After getting himself captured and then rescued by the Toads, Bucky plans to infiltrate a slave colony that is currently building a new Climate Converter.
| 5 | "On the Blink" | George Arthur Bloom | October 6, 1991 | 105 |
The Toad Empire has taken control of a koala homeworld and has installed a defense system that prevents any mammalian access. It is up to the android Blinky to sneak onto the planet and shut it down.
| 6 | "Kreation Konspiracy" | Martin Pasko | October 13, 1991 | 106 |
Rumor has it that a powerful device is located in a barren planet and Bucky's crew must intercept it before the Toads do. Meanwhile, Blinky is kidnapped by three elder toads, who may have a connection with the Empire's leader, KOMPLEX.
| 7 | "The Komplex Caper" | Doug Moench | October 20, 1991 | 107 |
KOMPLEX uses the power of Toad TV to control the mammalian population. Bucky must travel to the Toad Homeworld to shut down the transmission and, with any luck, KOMPLEX himself.
| 8 | "The Search for Bruce" | Rick Merwin | October 27, 1991 | 108 |
Brusier's brother, the former R.I. engineer Bruce, has returned in a spectral form but definitely alive. Meanwhile, the Toad Empire creates a new invention to teleport squads to anywhere in the Aniverse.
| 9 | "Corsair Canards" | Christy Marx | November 3, 1991 | 109 |
A treaty between the UAC Security Council and Dead-Eye's former pirate mates is about to be finalized, but a small group of pirates' recent plunders is on the verge of endangering the treaty's process.
| 10 | "The Artificers of Aldebaran" | Christy Marx; Bridget McKenna | November 10, 1991 | 110 |
Jenny's pupil, Princess Felicia, is abducted by Toadborg and it is up to her and Willy to save her. The source of power that the cybernetic villain is after may spell doom for Jenny's homeworld, Planet Aldebaran, and possibly the entire Aniverse.
| 11 | "The Warriors" | George Arthur Bloom | November 17, 1991 | 111 |
The Toad Air Marshal is kicked out of his army after his most recent failure at the hands of Bucky O'Hare. To regain his status, he joins a samurai lizard, who is plotting to take over a nearby planet: Kanopis III, Dead-Eye's homeworld.
| 12 | "Bye Bye Berserker Baboon" | Roger Slifer | November 24, 1991 | 112 |
The Toads invade the homeworld of Bruiser and his fellow Beetlegeusian Baboons, using special goggles to prevent their fear of their most terrifying foes. Bucky and crew fight back and soon encounter the empire's secret weapon: the unstoppable Terror Toad.
| 13 | "The Taking of Pilot Jenny" | Neal Adams; Peter Stone | December 1, 1991 | 113 |
Jenny has been captured by the toads. Toadborg is ordering a trade for a recently relinquished Climate Converter, unaware of Bucky's true objective.

== Home media releases ==
Sometime after its initial television airing, Family Home Entertainment in North America released all thirteen episodes of the series on six VHS tapes. In the United Kingdom, BBC Video released twelve out of the thirteen episodes across six VHS tapes. Metrodome Entertainment released all thirteen episodes on a Region 2 DVD set, as well as a single volume DVD, both of which are now out of print.
