= Ron Wagner =

American comics artist

- Born: Ron J. Wagner
- Areas: Penciller, Inker
- Notable works: G.I. Joe: A Real American Hero; The Punisher; Nth Man: The Ultimate Ninja; Batman: Legends of the Dark Knight

Ron J. Wagner is an American comics artist who has drawn for titles such as G.I. Joe: A Real American Hero, The Punisher, Nth Man: The Ultimate Ninja, and Batman: Legends of the Dark Knight. He is also an animation storyboard artist, games designer, and portrait artist. He attended the Joe Kubert School of Cartoon and Graphic Art, in a class which also included Lee Weeks, Andy Kubert, and Adam Kubert. Wagner's earliest work in professional comics, while in his third and final year at the Kubert School, was drawing backgrounds for Stan Woch in World's Finest Comics.

While penciler on Morbius, the Living Vampire, Wagner repeatedly came into conflict with the Comics Code Authority due to his insertion of sexually explicit content into his backgrounds.

== Bibliography ==
In roughly chronological order, comics work includes:

- New Talent Showcase #15, DC Comics, 1985
- Savage Tales (vol 2) (pencils and inks for "Camerone!", Marvel Comics, 1986)
- G.I. Joe: A Real American Hero #63-68, 70-74, 76, 80, 83, (Marvel Comics, 1987–1989)
- (G.I. Joe cover art: #64, 66-68, 70-80, 82-86, 100, 115)
- G.I. Joe Yearbook #3 cover pencils and pencils for "Hush Job," Marvel Comics, March 1987
- cover pencils for G.I. Joe Special Missions #7, 11, 13-18, 20-24, Marvel Comics, 1987–1988
- Marvel Comics Presents #25 (Marvel Comics, 1989)
- Nth Man: The Ultimate Ninja #1-7, 9-16 (Marvel Comics, 1989–1991)
- Excalibur #32-34 (Marvel Comics, 1990–1991)
- Incredible Hulk Annual #17 (Marvel Comics, 1991)
- Punisher War Journal #32-35, 38-39, Marvel Comics, 1991–1992)
- Ghost Rider #20-21, 25-27 (Marvel Comics, 1991–1992)
- Morbius, the Living Vampire #1-3, 5-14 (Marvel Comics, 1992–1993)
- Blaze: Legacy of Blood #1-4 (Marvel Comics, 1993–1994)
- X #6 (Dark Horse Comics, 1994)
- Sgt. Rock #400 (DC Comics, 1995)
- Daredevil #344-350 (Marvel Comics, 1995–1996)
- Hex #4, 8, 10 (DC Comics, 1995–1996)
- The Badger #13-14 (First Comics, 1996)
- Demonwars: Trial by Fire (CrossGen, 2003)
- Batman: Legends of the Dark Knight #201-203 (DC Comics, 2006)
- The 99 #3, 5 (Teshkeel Comics, 2007, 2008)
- G.I. Joe: A Real American Hero #163, 166, 173, 186, Annual 2012 (IDW Publishing, 2011-2012)
- Scooby Apocalypse #8-9, 14-16, 18, 20-23, 25 (DC Comics, 2016-2018)
