= Nth Man: The Ultimate Ninja =

- Nth Man: The Ultimate Ninja #1 (August 1989). © Marvel Comics. Pencils by Ron Wagner, inks by Bob McLeod.

Publication information
- Publisher: Marvel Comics
- Schedule: Monthly
- Format: Ongoing series
- Genre: Superhero
- Publication date: August 1989 - September 1990
- No. of issues: 16
- Main character(s): John Doe; Alfie O'Meagan

Creative team
- Written by: Larry Hama
- Penciller(s): Ron Wagner (all issues except #8); Dale Keown (issue #8)
- Inker: Fred Fredericks
- Letterer: Janice Chiang
- Colorist(s): Mark Chiarello; Bob Sharen

Nth Man: The Ultimate Ninja is a comic book about an American ninja set in an unspecified near future where World War III has started. It was written by Larry Hama between 1989 and 1990, based largely on his success writing the G.I. Joe: A Real American Hero comic, which he wrote concurrently with The Nth Man (and also features a modern ninja as one of the main characters). Nth Man and Alfie O'Meagan first appeared in Marvel Comics Presents #25 (August 1989). The series was meant to last for 24 issues, but was cancelled after 16. In spite of this, Hama was able to resolve the storyline early. Ron Wagner, who penciled the series for its entire run, attributes its commercial failure to its being set in a standalone reality (Earth-8908) instead of the mainstream Marvel Universe, as well as the absence of costumed characters.

== Plot ==
The series starts in medias res, with American soldiers parachuting into war-torn Moscow in an attempt to rescue the Nth Man. Using TV news commentary as a plot exposition device, it is revealed that the war was caused by Alfie O'Meagan, using his psychic abilities to neutralize all nuclear weapons on the planet, upsetting the balance of power.

During the course of the story, it is revealed that Alfie grew up in an orphanage alongside John Doe (the "Nth Man" of the title). Doe was adopted by an elderly Japanese man, who worked for the CIA's "Black Ops" division. Doe was raised as a ninja, taught to kill without regret. While in the orphanage, Alfie had visions of possible futures (the "could-be"s), and over time his powers grew so that he was able to control matter and produce other effects that were against the physical laws of the universe.

The storyline is complex, following numerous characters through war zones, plague-ridden post-apocalyptic landscapes, inside a video game, alien worlds, and various points in time and space. Alfie gains vast power, while losing his sanity. When the Soviet Union launches biological weapons, Alfie's attempt to turn them harmless backfires.

Using a narrative jump of one year (which was forced upon writer Larry Hama in order to wrap up the story, due to the cancellation of the series), we see that the biological weapons were turned into a mutagenic virus, and millions are transformed into psychotic, cannibalistic "moots". The conclusion of the story makes use of a paradox, and Doe and O'Meagan are shown to be responsible for their own origins.

== Relationships to other Marvel Comics ==
The series is not set within the primary setting of the Marvel Universe and the characters of those series are treated as fictional comic book characters. O'Meagan draws upon those comics as inspiration transforming his size and appearance to resemble that of Galactus, and that of a female character to resemble the Silver Surfer.

== Alfie O'Meagan ==
Alfie O'Meagan

Publication information
- Publisher: Marvel Comics
- First appearance: Marvel Comics Presents #25 (August 1989)
- Created by: Larry Hama

In-story information
- Abilities: Psychokinesis, telepathy, unspecified psychic ability to warp reality

The name "Alfie O'Meagan" can be recognized as a pun on Alpha and Omega. The first and last letters of the Greek alphabet were used in the Book of Revelation to describe the Judeo-Christian-Islamic God as the beginning and the end. That and the secular English idiom's use of the phrase to denote "the beginning and end" provide a clue to the time-twisting resolution to the Nth Man saga.

=== Fictional character biography ===
Alfie O'Meagan (his adopted name) is first portrayed a child, with various psychic abilities including clairvoyance and precognition. He calls his visions the "could-be"s and can somehow allow others to see them as well, especially his only childhood friend John Doe. As Alfie grows older, his powers vastly increase, giving him abilities such as mind control, teleportation, and telekinesis which can rearrange molecules on a massive scale.

Alfie is troubled by nightmares as a child, and his strange behavior and the odd events which occur around him cause him to be victimized by both orphanage bullies and the drunk and abusive man who runs the orphanage. While comic books serve as a means of escape, eventually he realizes that his powers can be used for revenge against his tormentors.

Alfie eventually uses his psychic powers to stop all the world's nuclear weapons from working. This has the unexpected side-effect of triggering a war between the USSR and the United States, which ultimately becomes World War III.

=== Other appearances ===
The Excalibur team of superheroes ran into Alfie O'Meagan in his alternate reality in Excalibur (vol. 1) #27. Here Alfie had assumed a form and giant stature similar to that of Galactus, except for the helmet which he only wore on one occasion. After a fight in which Rachel Summers unleashed the power of the Phoenix Force to subdue Alfie, the team was sent back to their native reality, Earth-616. Nightcrawler pushed "Cancel" on the remote control of Alfie's television, which nullified everything that had occurred.
