= Kitty Pryde, Agent of S.H.I.E.L.D. =

Marvel comic book series

- Cover to the first issue

Publication information
- Publisher: Marvel Comics
- Format: Ongoing series
- No. of issues: 3
- Main character(s): S.H.I.E.L.D.

Creative team
- Written by: Larry Hama
- Penciller(s): Jesus Redondo
- Inker(s): Sergio Melia
- Letterer(s): Jim Novak
- Colorist(s): Glynis Oliver
- Editor(s): Bobbie Chase

Kitty Pryde, Agent of S.H.I.E.L.D. is a comic book limited series published by Marvel Comics. The series was written by Larry Hama.

== Publication history ==
The series began publication in 1997 and ended in 1998.

1. "The Calling" (December, 1997)
2. "The Mission" (January, 1998)
3. "Pryde Goeth Before a Fall" (February, 1998)

== Plot ==
Kitty Pryde is called in by S.H.I.E.L.D. to investigate a virus infection in the S.H.I.E.L.D. Helicarrier's computer, only to discover that it is her old nemesis, Ogun.

The series also features Wolverine as a secondary character and there is information revealed about his past such as that he used to work for the Puzzle Palace with Nick Fury during the Cold War. (The Puzzle Palace was the nickname for the National Security Agency (NSA), the cryptologic intelligence agency of the United States that was founded in 1952.) We also see Logan meet a very young Carol Danvers, for the first time in the past.

== Reception ==
Charlie Jane Anders of io9.gizmodo believes the series would be a good series to adapt into the Agents of S.H.I.E.L.D. television series and ranked it at sixth place on her list.

== See also ==
- 1997 in comics
