= Spidey Meets the President! =

Comic book feature

- Publisher: Marvel Comics
- Publication date: 2009
- Genre: Superhero
- Title(s): The Amazing Spider-Man #583, The Amazing Spider-Man Presidents Day Special
- Main character(s): Spider-Man; Barack Obama; Chameleon

Creative team
- Writer: Zeb Wells
- Artist(s): Todd Nauck, Frank D'Armata

"Spidey Meets the President!" is a backup feature in The Amazing Spider-Man #583, written by Zeb Wells, with art by Todd Nauck and Frank D'Armata. The cover of the issue shows Barack Obama giving a thumbs-up to Spider-Man. The comic book was published the week before Obama's inauguration in January 2009.

== Plot ==
The story begins with Peter Parker standing among other reporters on the presidential inauguration of Barack Obama, photographing this historic moment. Suddenly a limo pulls up and reveals another Obama. The Secret Service does not know what to do, so Peter, who quickly dons his Spider-Man costume, asks both questions that only the real Barack Obama would be able to answer. When he asks what his nickname was during his college days, the actual Barack says his true name, and the fake one is confused and angry, causing him to reveal his true form, which turns out to be the super-villain known as the Chameleon. This gives Spider-Man the opportunity to capture the Chameleon and the Secret Service arrests him. Obama tells Spider-Man that he is a fan of the hero and thanks him. Afterward, as Obama swears his oath as President, Spider-Man is shown sitting at the top of the Washington Monument, where he thinks Biden notices him.

== Prologue ==
This story was prepended in The Amazing Spider-Man Presidents Day Special digital comic. The additional pages depict the minutes before the original story took place, with Obama getting ready for the inauguration. The Chameleon, disguised as Obama's tailor, locks him inside and takes his place, driving to the inauguration in the presidential limousine. However, the real Obama escapes and is driven to the ceremony in a second limousine by his soon-to-be Vice President Joseph Biden. Meanwhile, outside the capital, Peter Parker is running late to the inauguration ceremony and has forgotten his press credentials. So, he enters the area stealthily by using his spider-like abilities to climb over a high wall. However, he is spotted by Senator John McCain and a few Secret Service agents. The senator recognizes as him as the photographer from The Daily Bugle and even provides him with a spare press credential. Parker then joins the press corps and the prequel story connects to the main story.

== Reception ==
Typical sales for The Amazing Spider-Man are about 70,000 copies per issue. Issue #583 sold over 350,000 copies and went to five printings. It was the highest-selling regular series book of the 2000s.

== Collected edition ==
Title	Material collected	Published date	ISBN
Spider-Man: Election Day	Amazing Spider-Man #583 (Obama story), #584-588, Amazing Spider-Man: Extra! #1,3, Gettysburg Distress	May 2009	978-0785141310
