= Bucky O'Hare (arcade game) =

1992 video game

- Japanese flyer
- Developer: Konami
- Publisher: Konami
- Director: K. Wada
- Producer: S. Kido
- Programmers: E. Wada; Hisao Koyama; Takuya Ando
- Artists: Hiroshi Iuchi; Noriyuki Yokoki; Tetsuhiko Kikuchi
- Writer: K. Kinugasa
- Composers: Norio Hanzawa; Hideaki Shikama; Koji Kazaoka; Kazuhito Imai
- Platform: Arcade
- Release: September 1992
- Genres: Beat 'em up, run and gun
- Mode: Up to 4 players simultaneously

Bucky O'Hare is an arcade game produced by Konami in 1992.

== Gameplay ==
This video game is based on the cartoon television series Bucky O'Hare and the Toad Wars! under license from Hasbro. While it is generally classified as a scrolling beat 'em up game, as the player's character is also armed with a laser gun, it adds elements of a scrolling shooter.

Much like the cartoon, Bucky O'Hare features colorful animation, and voice actors from the series were hired to participate in the game's cutscenes.

The player chooses from four protagonists: Bucky O'Hare, the heroic rabbit captain of the space ship Righteous Indignation; Jenny, an "Aldebaran cat" and telepath; Dead-Eye Duck, a four-armed mallard; and A.F.C. Blinky, a one-eyed android. As in the television series, the characters must stop the Toad Empire from invading extraterrestrial planets and enslaving their peoples; to do so they must shoot their way through an army of brainwashed toads to destroy their evil leader, a computer program known as "Komplex" and release the "Interplanetary Life Force".

The enemies in the game are Al Negator, Toadborg, Total Terror Toad, a "Cyborg Spider", the various varieties of Toad Storm Troopers, the Toads' Air Marshall, and "Komplex-2-Go", who are featured in the comic book and cartoon series continuities.

== Soundtrack ==
The music tracks for arcade version of Bucky 'O Hare are Planet Warren, Climate Converter, Space River, Toad Star and Komplex. This version was contained on the CD soundtrack Konami All-Stars 1993: Music Station of Dreams on December 24, 1992.

== Reception ==
RePlay reported Bucky O'Hare to be the third most-popular arcade game at the time.

== See also ==
- Bucky O'Hare (NES video game), a 1992 video game also by Konami
