= Zeb Wells =

American writer (born 1977)

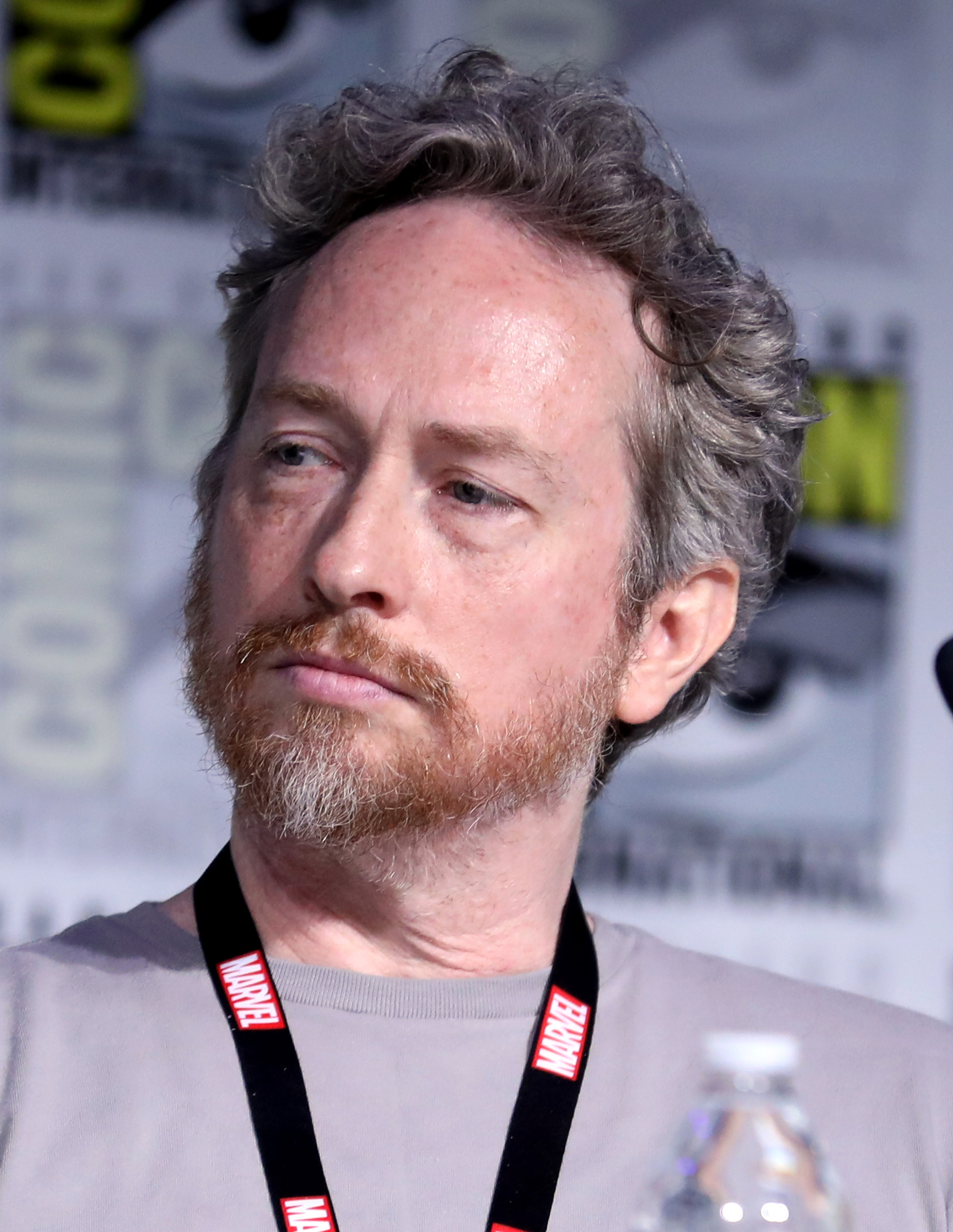
- Wells at San Diego Comic-Con in 2023
- Born: April 28, 1977 (age 49) Littleton, Colorado, U.S.
- Areas: Comic book writer; screenwriter; director; voice actor
- Notable works: SuperMansion; Robot Chicken; New Mutants; Venom: Dark Origin
- Spouse: Heidi Gardner (m. 2010; div. 2023)

Zeb Wells (born April 28, 1977) is an American comic book writer, screenwriter, director, and voice actor. He is known for his runs on The Amazing Spider-Man and The New Mutants from Marvel Comics, as well as being a writer, director, and voice actor on the Adult Swim animated series Robot Chicken. He is also the co-creator and executive producer of SuperMansion, as well as the voice of Robobot and Groaner.

== Early life ==
Zeb Wells grew up in Littleton, Colorado, and attended Columbine High School.

== Career ==
Wells is an Emmy and Annie Award-winning writer and actor for the TV show Robot Chicken, including the Emmy-nominated Robot Chicken: Star Wars Episode II. He later directed the sixth and seventh seasons of Robot Chicken.

Wells has written numerous titles for Marvel Comics, including Heroes for Hire, Civil War: Young Avengers/Runaways, and various Spider-Man titles. In 2006, Wells signed an exclusive contract with Marvel. He then wrote Venom: Dark Origin telling the origin of Eddie Brock and the eponymous symbiote, as well as the Dark Reign: Elektra tie-in series.

He wrote twenty of the first twenty-one issues of the third volume of The New Mutants, a series he launched with artist Diogenes Neves, including a tie-in to the "Necrosha" storyline. Being published in parallel with that series was Amazing Spider-Man Presents: Anti-Venom – New Ways To Live.

Wells launched the series Avenging Spider-Man with artist Joe Madureira in November 2011. He later wrote two Carnage miniseries with artist Clayton Crain: Carnage: Family Feud and Carnage, U.S.A..

In 2015 Wells co-created the stop-motion animated comedy television series SuperMansion and directed the first season.

In 2021, Wells was announced as one of the writers for the Amazing Spider-Man: Beyond storyline. In April 2022, Wells took over as lead writer for The Amazing Spider-Man along with artist John Romita Jr. The book was relaunched with a new #1 after the Beyond storyline, making it the sixth new #1 for the title. Wells' run has come under scrutiny from both fans and critics, particularly for the dissolution of Peter Parker and Mary Jane Watson's relationship, Mary Jane's new love interest Paul Rabin, and Ms. Marvel's death and subsequent resurrection, which has been criticized as fridging. Andrew Cutler of Comic Book Resources claimed that the series "needs a course correction" and that "the creative team must make changes to improve the overall quality of the storytelling".

In May 2025, it was announced that Wells would be penning the crossover one-shot Deadpool/Batman. The one-shot, illustrated by Greg Capullo, would mark the first time Marvel and DC's characters would properly crossover with each other since JLA/Avengers. It was published by Marvel on September 17, 2025. It was later accompanied by another one-shot, published by DC, entitled Batman/Deadpool, written by Grant Morrison and illustrated by Dan Mora.

== Controversy ==
Wells's take on The Amazing Spider-Man received high backlash from fans and critics for numerous creative decisions, including over-reliance on shock value instead of storytelling and weak and disjointed characterization. In a 2023 interview, Wells claimed that Marvel Editorial warned him not to attend any comic conventions after the release of The Amazing Spider-Man #26 due to a surprising plot twist in the issue (later revealed to be the death of Ms. Marvel). The move was widely criticized as fridging.

== Personal life ==
Wells was married to Saturday Night Live cast member Heidi Gardner from 2010 to 2023.

== Bibliography ==
=== Marvel Comics ===
- Spider-Man:
  - Spider-Man's Tangled Web:
    - Volume 3 (tpb, 160 pages, 2002, ISBN 0-7851-0951-X) includes:
      - "I was a Teenage Frog-Man" (with Duncan Fegredo, in #12, 2002)
    - Volume 4 (tpb, 176 pages, 2003, ISBN 0-7851-1064-X) includes:
      - "Behind the Mustache" (with Dean Haspiel, in #20, 2003)
  - Peter Parker: Spider-Man:
    - Spider-Man's Tangled Web Volume 4 (tpb, 176 pages, 2003, ISBN 0-7851-1064-X) includes:
      - "Fifteen Minutes of Shame" (with Jim Mahfood, in #42–43, 2002)
    - Senseless Violence (tpb, 160 pages, 2003, ISBN 0-7851-1171-9) collects:
      - "Just Another Manic Monday" (with Francisco Herrera, in #51–52, 2003)
      - "Rules of the Game" (with Michael O'Hare and Khary Randolph, in #53–55, 2003)
      - "Reborn" (with Sam Kieth, in #56–57, 2003)
  - Spider-Man/Doctor Octopus: Year One #1–5 (with Kaare Andrews, 2004) collected as SM/DO: Year One (tpb, 120 pages, 2005, ISBN 0-7851-1532-3)
  - Marvel Adventures: Spider-Man #13–16 (with Patrick Scherberger, 2006) collected as MASM: Concrete Jungle (tpb, 96 pages, 2006, ISBN 0-7851-2005-X)
  - Spider-Man Family #1: "A New Assassin from Beast Road" (with Akira Yamanaka, 2007) collected in SM: Japanese Knights (tpb, 128 pages, 2008, ISBN 0-7851-3212-0)
  - The Amazing Spider-Man:
    - Brand New Day, Volume 1 (hc, 200 pages, 2008, ISBN 0-7851-2843-3; tpb, 2008, ISBN 0-7851-2845-X) includes:
      - "Harry and the Hollisters" (with Mike Deodato Jr., in #546, 2008)
    - Brand New Day, Volume 2 (hc, 168 pages, 2008, ISBN 0-7851-2844-1; tpb, 2008, ISBN 0-7851-2846-8) includes:
      - "Sometimes It Snows in April" (with Chris Bachalo, in #555–557, 2008)
    - Kraven's First Hunt (hc, 112 pages, 2008, ISBN 0-7851-3216-3; tpb, 2009, ISBN 0-7851-3243-0) includes:
      - "Birthday Boy" (with Patrick Olliffe, in Extra! #1, 2008)
    - Crime and Punisher (hc, 136 pages, 2009, ISBN 0-7851-3393-3; tpb, 2009, ISBN 0-7851-3417-4) includes:
      - "Old Huntin' Buddies" (with Paolo Rivera, in #577, 2009)
    - Election Day (hc, 184 pages, 2009, ISBN 0-7851-3395-X; tpb, 2010, ISBN 0-7851-3419-0) includes:
      - "Spidey Meets the President!" (with Todd Nauck, in #583, 2009)
    - 24/7 (hc, 176 pages, 2009, ISBN 0-7851-3396-8; tpb, 2010, ISBN 0-7851-3420-4) includes:
      - "Birthday Boy" (with Paolo Rivera, in Extra! #2, 2009)
    - Died in Your Arms Tonight (hc, 192 pages, 2009, ISBN 0-7851-4459-5; tpb, 2010, ISBN 0-7851-4485-4) includes:
      - "Fight at the Museum" (with Derec Donovan, in #600, 2009)
    - The Gauntlet, Volume 5: Lizard (hc, 128 pages, 2010, ISBN 0-7851-4615-6; tpb, 2011, ISBN 0-7851-4616-4) collects:
      - "Shed Prelude" (with Xurxo G. Penalta, in Web of Spider-Man #6, 2010)
      - "Shed" (with Chris Bachalo and Emma Rios, in #629–633, 2010)
    - Origin of the Species (hc, 232 pages, 2011, ISBN 0-7851-4621-0; tpb, 2011, ISBN 0-7851-4622-9) includes:
      - "Honor Thy Father..." (with Mike del Mundo, in #647, 2010)
  - Venom: Dark Origin #1–5 (with Angel Medina, 2008–2009) collected as V: Dark Origin (tpb, 120 pages, 2009, ISBN 0-7851-2748-8)
  - Anti-Venom – New Ways to Live #1–3 (with Paulo Siqueira, 2009–2010) collected as The ASM Presents: AV (tpb, 120 pages, 2010, ISBN 0-7851-4161-8)
  - Carnage:
    - Carnage #1–5 (with Clayton Crain, 2011) collected as C: Family Feud (hc, 168 pages, 2011, ISBN 0-7851-5112-5; tpb, 2012, ISBN 0-7851-5113-3)
    - Carnage, U.S.A. #1–5 (with Clayton Crain, 2012) collected as C U.S.A. (hc, 120 pages, 2012, ISBN 0-7851-6073-6)
  - Avenging Spider-Man #1–5 (with Joe Madureira, Greg Land, and Leinil Francis Yu, 2012) collected in Spider-Man: My Friends Can Beat Up Your Friends (hc, 120 pages, 2012, ISBN 0-7851-5778-6)
- New Warriors v3 #1–6 (with Skottie Young, 2005–2006) collected as NW: Reality Check (tpb, 144 pages, 2006, ISBN 0-7851-1661-3)
- Fantastic Four/Iron Man: Big in Japan #1–4 (with Seth Fisher, 2005–2006) collected as FF/IM: Big in Japan (tpb, 120 pages, 2006, ISBN 0-7851-1776-8)
- Marvel Romance Redux: Guys & Dolls: "Formula for Love!" (with Gene Colan, 2006) collected in Marvel Romance Redux: Another Kind of Love (tpb, 168 pages, 2007, ISBN 0-7851-2090-4)
- Doc Samson #4–5: "Living Totem" (with Frank Espinosa, co-feature, 2006)
- Civil War: Young Avengers/Runaways (with Stefano Caselli, 2006) collected as Civil War: YA&R (tpb, 112 pages, 2007, ISBN 0-7851-2317-2)
- Marvel Adventures: Fantastic Four #17–20 (with Kano, 2006–2007) collected as MAFF: All 4 One, 4 for All (tpb, 96 pages, 2007, ISBN 0-7851-2209-5)
- Heroes for Hire (with Al Rio, Clay Mann and others, 2007–2008) collected as:
  - Ahead of the Curve (includes #8–10, tpb, 120 pages, 2007, ISBN 0-7851-2363-6)
  - World War Hulk (collects #11–15, tpb, 120 pages, 2008, ISBN 0-7851-2800-X)
- Daredevil: Battlin' Jack Murdock #1–4 (with Carmine Di Giandomenico, 2007) collected as D: Battlin' Jack Murdock (tpb, 104 pages, 2008, ISBN 0-7851-2534-5)
- Secret Invasion: Who Do You Trust?: "Marvel Boy: Master of the Cube" (with Steve Kurth, one-shot, 2008)
- Elektra:
  - Dark Reign: Elektra #1–5 (with Clay Mann, 2009) collected as Dark Reign: Elektra (tpb, 120 pages, 2009, ISBN 0-7851-3843-9)
  - Shadowland: Elektra (with Emma Rios, one-shot, 2010) collected in Shadowland: Street Heroes (hc, 192 pages, 2011, ISBN 0-7851-4887-6; tpb, 2011, ISBN 0-7851-4888-4)
- X-Men:
  - New Mutants vol. 3 (with Diogenes Neves, Paul Davidson and Leonard Kirk, 2009–2011) collected as:
    - Return of the Legion (collects #1–5, hc, 144 pages, 2009, ISBN 0-7851-3992-3; tpb, 2010, ISBN 0-7851-4064-6)
    - Necrosha (includes #6–10, hc, 160 pages, 2010, ISBN 0-7851-3993-1; tpb, 2010, ISBN 0-7851-4065-4)
    - Second Coming (includes #12–14 and Second Coming #2, hc, 392 pages, 2010, ISBN 0-7851-4678-4; tpb, 2011, ISBN 0-7851-5705-0)
    - Fall of the New Mutants (collects #15–21, hc, 168 pages, 2011, ISBN 0-7851-4583-4; tpb, 2011, ISBN 0-7851-4584-2)
  - X-Necrosha: "Binary" (with Ibraim Roberson, one-shot, 2009) collected in X-Necrosha (hc, 448 pages, 2010, ISBN 0-7851-4674-1; tpb, 2010, ISBN 0-7851-4675-X)
  - Hellions (with Stephen Segovia, 2020–2021)
    - Vol. 1 (collects #1-4, tpb, 128 pages, 2020, ISBN 130292558X)
    - Vol. 2 (collects #7-12, tpb, 160 pages, 2021, ISBN 1302925598)
    - Vol. 3 (collects #13-18, tpb, 176 pages, 2022, ISBN 1302930184)
    - Hellions By Zeb Wells (collects #1-18, hc, 512 pages, 2022, ISBN 1302933728)
- Ant-Man vol. 2 #1-5 (with Dylan Burnett, 2020) collected as Ant-Man: Worldhive (tpb, 2020)

=== Virgin Comics ===
- Snake Woman:
  - Snake Woman (with Shekhar Kapur, Michael Gaydos, Dean Ruben Hyrapiet and Vivek Shinde, 2006–2007) collected as:
    - A Snake in the Grass (collects #1–5, tpb, 144 pages, 2007, ISBN 1-934413-01-1)
    - The Faithful (collects #6–10, tpb, 144 pages, 2007, ISBN 1-934413-07-0)
  - Snake Woman: Tale of the Snake Charmer #1–6 (with Vivek Shinde, 2007) collected as SW: TotSC (tpb, 144 pages, 2008, ISBN 1-934413-20-8)
  - Snake Woman: Curse of the 68 #1–4 (with Pradip Ingale, Manu P. K. and M Subramanian, 2008)

== Filmography ==
Year	Title	Role	Notes
2008	Robot Chicken: Star Wars Episode II	Dengar, Imperial Officer, Youngling (voice)	
2009–2016	Robot Chicken	Various voices	12 episodes
2009	Titan Maximum	Marine #3, Tank Commander, Cadet #6 (voice)	2 episodes
2010	Robot Chicken: Star Wars Episode III	Dengar (voice)	
2012	Robot Chicken DC Comics Special	Sinestro, Swamp Thing (voice)	
2014	Robot Chicken DC Comics Special 2: Villains in Paradise	Sinestro, Swamp Thing, Captain Cold (voice)	
2015	Hell and Back	Writer	
2015–2019	SuperMansion	Robobot, various voices	25 episodes
2015	Robot Chicken DC Comics Special III: Magical Friendship	Green Arrow, Swamp Thing (voice)	
2022	Thor: Love and Thunder	Co-writer (uncredited)	
2022	She-Hulk: Attorney at Law	Writer	Episode: "The Retreat"
2023	The Marvels	Co-writer (uncredited)	
2024	Deadpool & Wolverine	Co-writer	
2025–present	Marvel Zombies	Head writer	
Unaired	Star Wars Detours	Dengar (voice)	
