= Bucky O'Hare (NES video game) =

1992 video game

- Developer: Konami
- Publisher: Konami
- Director: Masato Maegawa
- Designers: Masato Maegawa; H. Awai
- Artists: Kaname Shindoh; Madonna Taira; Toshiharu Furukawa
- Composer: Tomoko Sumiyama
- Platform: Nintendo Entertainment System
- Release: JP: January 31, 1992; NA: February 1992; EU: February 18, 1993
- Genres: Platform; Shoot 'em up; Arcade adventure
- Mode: Single-player

Bucky O'Hare (Japanese: バッキー オヘア) is a 1992 platform game for the Nintendo Entertainment System based on the comic book series of the same name. The game was developed, under the direction of Masato Maegawa, by Konami, which also published it in North America in February 1992 and in Europe on February 18, 1993. Graphics were created by Kaname Shindoh, Madonna Taira, and Toshiharu Furukawa, and the music was composed by Tomoko Sumiyama.

Bucky O'Hare stars the titular rabbit as the captain of the Righteous Indignation, which protects the parallel universe of the Aniverse. His other crew members, duck Dead-Eye, cat Jenny, android Blinky, and human Willy, have been captured by the Toad Air Marshall. The first four levels take place on the Green, Red, Blue, and Yellow Planets, where the crew members are imprisoned. The player starts out with Bucky, and the other kidnapped crew members are playable once rescued and have different abilities and weapons. After all the members are saved, the Toad Air Marshall then kidnap the Righteous Indignation again in the Magma Tanker. The remainder of the game involves the crew members saving each other, blowing up the Magma Tanker and escaping.

Bucky O'Hare was well received by critics. Reviewers praised its graphics and exciting gameplay, but disliked its lack of original contributions towards the platform genre and were divided on its difficulty.

== Gameplay and plot ==
Bucky navigates the Yellow Planet using fast-moving asteroids as platforms.

Bucky O'Hare is a side-scrolling shoot 'em up arcade adventure platform game. It takes place in a parallel universe called the Aniverse, where the robot K.O.M.P.L.E.X. plans to destroy the captain of the Righteous Indignation, rabbit Bucky O'Hare. It orders the Toad Air Marshall to kidnap members of the Righteous Indignation and imprison them throughout the Toad Empire. The Toad Air Marshall goes after the Indignation while they are on a small transport riding to their headquarters. Bucky barely evades, but the crew members, android Blinky, cat Jenny, duck Dead-Eye and human Willy DeWitt, are trapped in four separate planets, which are the first four levels.

The four Planets can be played almost in any order. Blinky is stuck in the ecologically themed Green Planet, consisting of waterfalls and trees as part of the level design and worms, bees, fish, and other creatures as enemies. Dead-Eye is trapped in the Red Planet, a volcano-and-lava-heavy stage with rock platforms. The icy Blue Planet holds Jenny, and the Yellow Planet, which is the largest and has laser cannons and floating asteroids, contains Willy. The player can switch characters anytime by pressing the select button.

The planets are divided into eight or more acts with different gameplay styles and scrolling directions (either vertical or horizontal). For example, in the Green Planet, sections include climbing a large tree, jumping on platforms, riding a log on water, and going down a waterfall. Throughout the game, the protagonists fend off enemies such as androids and cyborgs modeled after toads or with toads in them, as well as parts of the environment, like fireballs shooting from a volcano. Bosses are scattered throughout and are not always at the end of a level.

Each crewmate is playable once rescued and has different weapons. Bucky uses a normal gun, Willy and Jenny both shoot beams, Deadeye shoots three bullets going in different directions, and Blinky has short-range bombs needed to destroy the ice blocks on the Blue Planet. The characters also have special abilities; Bucky has a long jump, Jenny has a third eye that forms an energetic crystal ball, Willy can shoot a larger beam which can go through enemies and thus kill multiple at a time, Blinky can fly with a jetpack, and Deadeye can climb vertical slopes. The special abilities are charged by collecting power-up icons (the amount of power is indicated by the power-up meter) and are activated by holding the B button; the longer it is held, the more powerful the execution will be. Extra lives, bonus points, and health are also collectable, and continues are unlimited.

Once the crew are reunited, they are again attacked in space and sucked into the Toads' Magnum Tanker; only Bucky and Blinky are playable at this point. The remainder of the game takes place in the ship. Its hazards and enemies include beams, mind-controlled crew mates, anti-gravity fields, animal-eating plants, and the ship's toads. The two journey through the Toad Mother ship, freeing their imprisoned crewmates. All members gather together and Bucky hatches a plan for the crew to escape down the Salvage Chute and blow up the ship. The Indignation succeeds, but the crew remain vigilant as the fight continues.

== Development and release ==
Bucky O'Hare was directed by Masato Maegawa, who also programmed the game together with H. Awai. Kaname Shindoh, Madonna Taira, and Toshiharu Furukawa designed the graphics, and Tomoko Sumiyama composed the music. The staff, like other employees at Konami, went on to work at Treasure, which was founded the same year as Bucky O'Hare's release. In addition to two people with "special thanks" credits, Hideyuki Suganami and Kouichi Kimura, later working at Treasure, Maegawa was founder and president of the company, and Shindoh worked on the visuals of Alien Soldier (1995). Hardcore Gaming 101's Kurt Kalata saw a connection between the game and Treasure's 16-bit library, that being the "frantic rush approach to level design". First announced in Nintendo Power in the June 1991 issue, Bucky O'Hare was previewed in magazines like Electronic Gaming Monthly and GamePro before its release. It was released worldwide in February 1992.

== Reception ==
Reception

Review scores
| Publication | Score |
|---|---|
| AllGame | 3.5/5 |
| Aktueller Software Markt | 9/12 |
| Computer and Video Games | 75/100 |
| Electronic Gaming Monthly | 7/10, 8/10, 8/10, 8/10 |
| Famitsu | 6/10, 8/10, 6/10, 4/10 |
| GameSpy | 8/10 |
| GameZone | 93/100 |
| Official Nintendo Magazine | 72/100 |
| Total! | 86% |
| Video Games (DE) | 89% |
| VideoGames & Computer Entertainment | 7/10 |
| Game Power | 8/10 |
| N-Force | 81/100 |
| Play Time | 68% |
| Top Secret | 5/5 |

Bucky O'Hare received generally positive reviews upon release. Critics argued that Bucky O'Hare had solid gameplay and presentation, but did not contribute anything new to its platform shoot 'em up genre. Reviews from Nintendo Game Zone and the Polish magazine Top Secret called it one of the best NES titles, primarily due to the gameplay's enticing nature and variety. Critics for Electronic Gaming Monthly felt its lack of new ideas was made up for by its amount of power-ups, enemies, gameplay variety, and tight controls. Nintendo Game Zone reviewer Nick Griffiths and Total! journalist Andy highlighted the huge size of the levels, Griffiths noting how they keep gamers playing for a long time even with unlimited continues. The game's fast speed, specifically with its titular playable character, was also highlighted. A critic for Play Time said the game scrolled so fast the player would get hit by a small, unnoticed enemy. Less positively, writers from Nintendo Magazine System stated that it had few original ideas, such as moving floors and a chase from lava, and the high quantity of prior platformers based on cartoons made the product especially uninteresting.

Bucky O'Hare's difficulty was debated. Sushi-X of Electronic Gaming Monthly praised it as "ever increasing" for players of all skill levels, and VideoGames & Computer Entertainment journalist B.W. felt it was balanced, where the earliest levels could be played by even the least experienced gamers, and the difficulty level would gradually increase. Some critics found it to be hard, such as Rob of N-Force, who called the experience "a ruddy good challenge", featuring "loads of hair-pulling levels to blast your way through, all requiring lots of skill and bravado". Andy, who found its difficulty to be "nightmarish", and critics writing for GamePro, dubbed "The Pizza Guys", attributed much of the difficulty from the design of the levels, like disappearing block platforms, lava steams, meteor platforms, Ice Snakes, and spikes.

Kalata, more unfavorably, criticized the game for only having extreme ends of difficulty. He argued that most of the enemies did not inflict much damage, and felt the instant deaths were cheap. He reasoned that the player cannot know what will kill them until it is too late, citing the heads of the platform snake on the Blue Planet as an example. Even Andy, who felt the levels generally got progressively tougher, said there were random bumps in the challenge, particularly with its infinite continues, easy bosses and short sections that can be traversed "without firing a shot". Nintendo Magazine System also condemned the infinite continues, as well as predictable level design, for making the game too easy.

AllGame editor Christian Huey called Bucky O'Hare's visuals "well above par", and GameZone's Nick Griffiths described it as "wild and incredible" for its console. Top Secret suggested it was well-animated and its stages looked unique from other games of its kind, such as the giant sprites, "unexpected turns and sophisticated opponents". Play Time, in addition to highlighting Bucky's sprite animation, praised the backgrounds and scrolling. Journalists from N-Force appreciated the visuals' closeness to the cartoon as well as taking advantage of the capabilities of the NES, highlighting its animations and vibrant colors. In B.W.'s view, "the graphics aren't extraordinary, but the way they are done, especially the characters during the introduction sequences, gives the game character". Critics from Nintendo Magazine System, less favorably, found some of the sprites "woody", the animation poor, and the backgrounds needing more work. The most favorable opinions on the soundtrack called it the best for an action title on the NES, memorable, and "performed with some virtuosity". Less favorable critics found it either only "tolerable", having not "that much to offer", or "screechy and a bit dull".

In 2015, USgamer called Bucky O'Hare one of the top 11 best NES games of 1992 to 1994, and Retro Gamer's readers-voted list of best all-time NES games ranked it 24. The magazine's Nick Thorpe wrote the game "provided some of the most attractive visuals on the system alongside some pretty strong gameplay".

== See also ==
- Bucky O'Hare (arcade game), a 1992 arcade game also by Konami
