= Bucky O'Hare =

- Bucky O'Hare on the cover of the 1992 eponymous video game

Publication information
- Publisher: Continuity Comics
- First appearance: Echo of Futurepast #1 (May 1984)
- Created by: Larry Hama; Michael Golden

In-story information
- Team affiliations: S.P.A.C.E (Sentient Protoplasm Against Colonial Encroachment)
- Abilities: Master tactician and field commander

Bucky O'Hare is a fictional character and the hero of an eponymous comic book series and spin-off media, including an animated TV series and various toys and video games. He was created by comic book writer Larry Hama and comic book artist Michael Golden between 1977 and 1978 and made its publishing debut in Echo of Futurepast #1 in May 1984 by Continuity Comics.

The storyline of Bucky O'Hare follows a parallel universe where a galactic war is ongoing between the United Animals Federation (U.A.F.) and the sinister Toad Empire. The U.A.F. is an interplanetary republic run by sapient mammals, while the Toad Empire is controlled by a vast computer system known as KOMPLEX, which has led the highly consumerist toad population to fight an expansionist campaign against the rest of the galaxy.

== Overview ==
The original Bucky O'Hare was published by Neal Adams's Continuity Comics between 1984 and 1985. The series consisted of six eight-page installments, printed in issues #1-6 of the comics anthology series Echo of Futurepast, with Hama writing, Michael Golden on art, and colors by Cory Adams. All six parts were collected into an oversized graphic novel in 1986.

The comic book spawned an animated television adaptation, Bucky O'Hare and the Toad Wars, and in 1991, to coincide with its release, the original comic was re-published as its own standalone series, in an expanded form. Each issue of this series modified the original art and script, inserting many new panels and scenes into the story, lengthening each 8-page chapter to around 24 pages apiece. The series was intended to run for six issues, but only five were published between January 1991 and March 1992, leaving the expanded version of the story incomplete. Hama wrote a second Bucky O'Hare arc, which was never published.

When the animated series was broadcast in the United Kingdom in 1992, DC Thomson published their own Bucky O'Hare comic. The first six issues of the series re-printed the expanded version of the original US series (including the previously-unpublished sixth issue) after which the series moved on to original material incorporating characters and concepts from the animated series. These new stories were penned by Continuity Comics writer Peter Stone, who also co-wrote the final episode of the animated series, penciled by Andre Coates, and inked by Joel Adams. The UK series ran bi-weekly from March to December of 1992, but was cancelled after 20 issues, ending on an unresolved cliffhanger.

The cartoon, meanwhile, ran from September to December 1991, along with a series of action figures. During that period, Konami produced two tie-in video games based on the property: an NES version and an arcade version, both released in 1992.

In 2007, Vanguard Productions reprinted the original comic in a black-and-white "manga"-style digest size collection, titled Bucky O'Hare and the Toad Menace. This edition collected the expanded, six-issue version of the Hama/Golden series (including the sixth issue, previously not available in the US), and two further stories from issues #7 and #8 of the UK series. A deluxe edition was also released. However, some copies of this edition were just the standard edition with a slipcover, not the signed, numbered color version that was advertised.

== Characters ==
Bucky O'Hare and crew, art by Michael Golden

Bucky and his crew are members of the S.P.A.C.E. organization, which stands for Sentient Protoplasm Against Colonial Encroachment.

- Bucky O'Hare is a green hare and the captain of a S.P.A.C.E. frigate named The Righteous Indignation. His crew was introduced in the comic and consists of:
- Jenny is the first mate and pilot, a female cat from the planet Aldebaran with mysterious magical and psionic powers common to females of her species. They include telepathy, astral projection, energy blasts, and healing. Because of the Prime Directive of the Aldebaran Sisterhood, she keeps these powers secret from the other members of the crew.
- Bruce is a Betelgeusian Berserker Baboon who served as the Righteous Indignation's engineer, before being killed in a power feed back from the photon accelerator, that dissolved his body. In the TV show, he vanishes into another dimension when the ship's photon accelerator malfunctioned during battle.
- Willy DuWitt is an engineer and a pre-teen human genius from San Francisco who enters the parallel universe via a portal between the ship's photon accelerator and his own accelerator at home. He replaced Bruce, the former engineer, who was vaporized when toad plasma weapons caused a massive feedback in the ship's photon accelerator. Later, Willy became stranded when his parents turned off the photon accelerator back in his room. Bucky and his crew decide to keep Willy a secret from the Toads.
- Deadeye Duck is a gunner and a four-armed former space pirate duck from Kanopis III. He is missing an eye, and is impatient and violent, preferring to let his four laser pistols do the talking for him. He speaks with a Scottish accent.
- AFC Blinky is an advanced AFC ("Android" First Class). It has only one eye and uses the phrase "Calamity and woe!" to identify problem situations for Bucky and his crew-mates.

The members of the Toad Empire introduced in the comic are as follows:

- KOMPLEX is an undisputed ruler of the Toad Empire and a sapient computer program who was designed to run the consumerist toad culture, and it did, by conquering it and militarizing it. Its name, in toad language, is an anagram for 'Feed me'.
- Toad Air Marshall is one of KOMPLEX's foremost commanders, with a uniform adorned with medals and a face covered in warts.
- Toad Borg is one of KOMPLEX's elite troops, part toad, part robot.
- Storm Toads are indoctrinated soldiers who serve as the primary attack force for the Empire.
- Storm Toad Death Kommandos is a berserker platoon of the most savage and fearless storm toads, who are kept confined until circumstances require them. Regular toads are advised to stay clear and remain out of sight when they are unleashed, yet they run in fear at the sight of a Berserker Baboon.

In the comic, Bucky and crew escape a toad attack but must rescue Jenny when she is captured by the toads. In the end, a strange, nigh-omnipotent mouse banishes the toads that attack Bucky to "a safe place where the food is bad and taxes are high". Willy's parents, not knowing what the photon accelerator does, deactivate it, trapping him in the parallel universe.

== In other media ==
Bucky O'Hare and the Toad Wars! is a syndicated animated television network show which aired in 1991.

== Video games ==
A Bucky O'Hare game was released for the Nintendo Entertainment System in 1992, which required Bucky to rescue each of his crew members (except Bruiser, who is not featured in the game) on a series of planets. As each character was rescued, the player gained the ability to switch between them and Bucky on the fly to deal with different problems. Immediately after regaining his entire crew, they are once again captured and imprisoned on the Toad mother ship. Bucky and Blinky, sharing the same cell, break out and must rescue the remaining members. Afterwards, they continue through the monstrous ship. The gameplay and level design closely resemble that of Capcom's Mega Man series with elements from Konami's Contra series and character switching from Konami's Teenage Mutant Ninja Turtles mixed in.

An arcade game by Konami was also released which allowed up to four players to control Bucky, Jenny, Deadeye or Blinky. It is a run-n-gun game similar to the Konami arcade games Sunset Riders, Mystic Warriors, Wild West C.O.W.-Boys of Moo Mesa, and Aliens. The plot of the arcade game allowed players to achieve final victory over the toads by releasing an energy called the Interplanetary Life Force contained within KOMPLEX. The game also featured the original voice cast.

Konami also released a Bucky O'Hare handheld electronic game.

== Toy line ==
In 1991, the toy company Hasbro released a line of action figures based closely on the Bucky O'Hare series. Most of the major characters were represented: Bucky O'Hare, Deadeye Duck, Willy DuWitt, Blinky, Bruiser and Commander Dogstar were the heroes released, and Toadborg, Air Marshall, Storm Toad Trooper and Al Negator were the villains that made it to the shelves. Two vehicles were released as well: the good guy vehicle was the Toad Croaker, while the bad guy vehicle was the Toad Double Bubble.

The line was terminated before the next two series of action figures could be finished. There are several photographs available online of the unreleased figures, some completely painted with accessories, and others as unpainted prototypes. At least one photo shows the fully packaged Jenny, likely because this figure was completed in time for the first release, but was delayed to be part of the second. Several others show Pitstop Pete and Sly Leezard both as unpainted and as completed figures. Bucky in a spacesuit, Rumble Bee, Kamikaze Kamo and Total Terror Toad are the other finished figures. The mobile configuration of the chief villain Komplex (Komplex-2-Go in the arcade game), Digger, and Tri-Bot (a minor villain from the final episode) are the other unpainted prototypes known to exist from these photos. More recently, both an unpainted prototype and a fully finalized figure of Jenny was revealed online in a review video.

In 2017, Boss Fight Studios released new Bucky O'Hare action figures. These updated moulds feature multiple points of articulation and interchangeable hands and faces. The first figures that were released were Bucky O'Hare and the First Mate Jenny. Later releases included Stealth Mission Bucky, Astral Projection Jenny, Deadeye Duck, and the Storm Toad Trooper. Two promotional figures were also released; an Easter themed Bucky (moulded in chocolate themed colors) and a Corsair Canard Deadeye Duck who was packaged in a promotional steel lunch-box featuring Bucky O'Hare concept art. The line also introduced Bruiser, who is listed as a deluxe figure and comes packaged in a window-box with Bruiser artwork and bio. Five figure moulds were produced and nine figure variants were released. The final two releases were a new figure mould of Mimi Lafleur, and an Aniverse color variant of the Storm Toad. After that, Boss Fight Studio lost the license to produce any further figures, due to Continuity Studios having lost interest in the line.

== Legacy ==
During the 1990s, VHS tapes were released by Family Home Entertainment. Due to the lack of a US domestic distributor for Sunbow Productions (it was formerly Rhino and later Sony Wonder), the cartoon had been stalled in releasing a Region 1 DVD. A company called Exposure Entertainment was supposed to have released the 13 episodes on DVD in North America, in Region 1 NTSC format for the first time, but the overall release was either very rare and limited, or no set had appeared at all. The same company had a similar issue with their first season release of Biker Mice from Mars, but it did have a Region 2 PAL DVD release in the UK by Metrodome Distribution, which as of 2013 is now out of print. Hasbro has recently acquired the rights to most of their cartoon library, including Bucky O'Hare, but it is unknown whether the series will see a DVD release in Region 1.

In 2008, Continuity Studios produced a CGI animated Bucky O'Hare short, partially adapting the opening scene of the original comic, in which the Righteous Indignation comes under fire from a Toad squadron, even featuring dialogue lifted straight out of the comic.

In 2006, Neal Adams was reportedly working on a Bucky O'Hare film project. No updates were provided and the project was cancelled.
