= David Hutchison =

American football player and coach (born 1976)

Biographical details
- Born: January 10, 1976 (age 50); Onsted, Michigan, U.S.

Playing career
- 1995–1997: Adrian
- Position: Wide receiver

Coaching career (HC unless noted)
- 1998: Adrian (SA/WR)
- 1999–2000: Toledo (GA/TE/WR)
- 2001: Missouri (offensive GA)
- 2002: Indiana State (RB)
- 2003–2004: Indiana State (OL)
- 2005–2006: Indiana State (OL/recruiting)
- 2007: Michigan (offensive QC)
- 2008–2009: Glenville State (OC/OL)
- 2010: Glenville State (asst. HC/OC/OL)
- 2011–2016: Glenville State

Head coaching record
- Overall: 34–32

David Earl Hutchison (born January 10, 1976) is an American football coach and former player. He served as the head football coach at Glenville State College from 2011 to 2016, compiling a record of 34–32.

== Coaching career ==
Hutchison graduated from Adrian College in 1999 and played at Adrian as wide receiver for three seasons. While finishing his degree at Adrian, Hutchison was a student assistant coaching wide receivers at Adrian in 1998. He then became a graduate assistant at Toledo from 1999 to 2000 and Missouri in 2001 all under Gary Pinkel. In 2002, he became running backs coach at Indiana State then became offensive line coach in 2003. For the 2005 and 2006 seasons, Hutchison was also recruiting coordinator at Indiana State.

After five seasons at Indiana State, Hutchison joined Lloyd Carr's final staff at Michigan in 2007 as offensive quality control coach. In 2008, Hutchison joined Glenville State College as offensive line coach and offensive coordinator. Glenville State finished in first place in the West Virginia Intercollegiate Athletic Conference in 2008. In 2010, Hutchison was promoted to assistant head coach. He became head coach in 2011.

== Head coaching record ==
Year	Team	Overall	Conference	Standing	Bowl/playoffs
Glenville State Pioneers (West Virginia Intercollegiate Athletic Conference) (2011–2012)
2011	Glenville State	5–6	5–3	T–4th	
2012	Glenville State	6–5	6–2	T–2nd	
Glenville State Pioneers (Mountain East Conference) (2013–2016)
2013	Glenville State	6–5	5–4	5th	
2014	Glenville State	5–6	5–5	6th	
2015	Glenville State	7–4	6–4	T–3rd	
2016	Glenville State	5–6	5–5	T–4th	
Glenville State:		34–32	27–18		
Total:		34–32			
