= Michael Golden (comics) =

American comics artist and writer

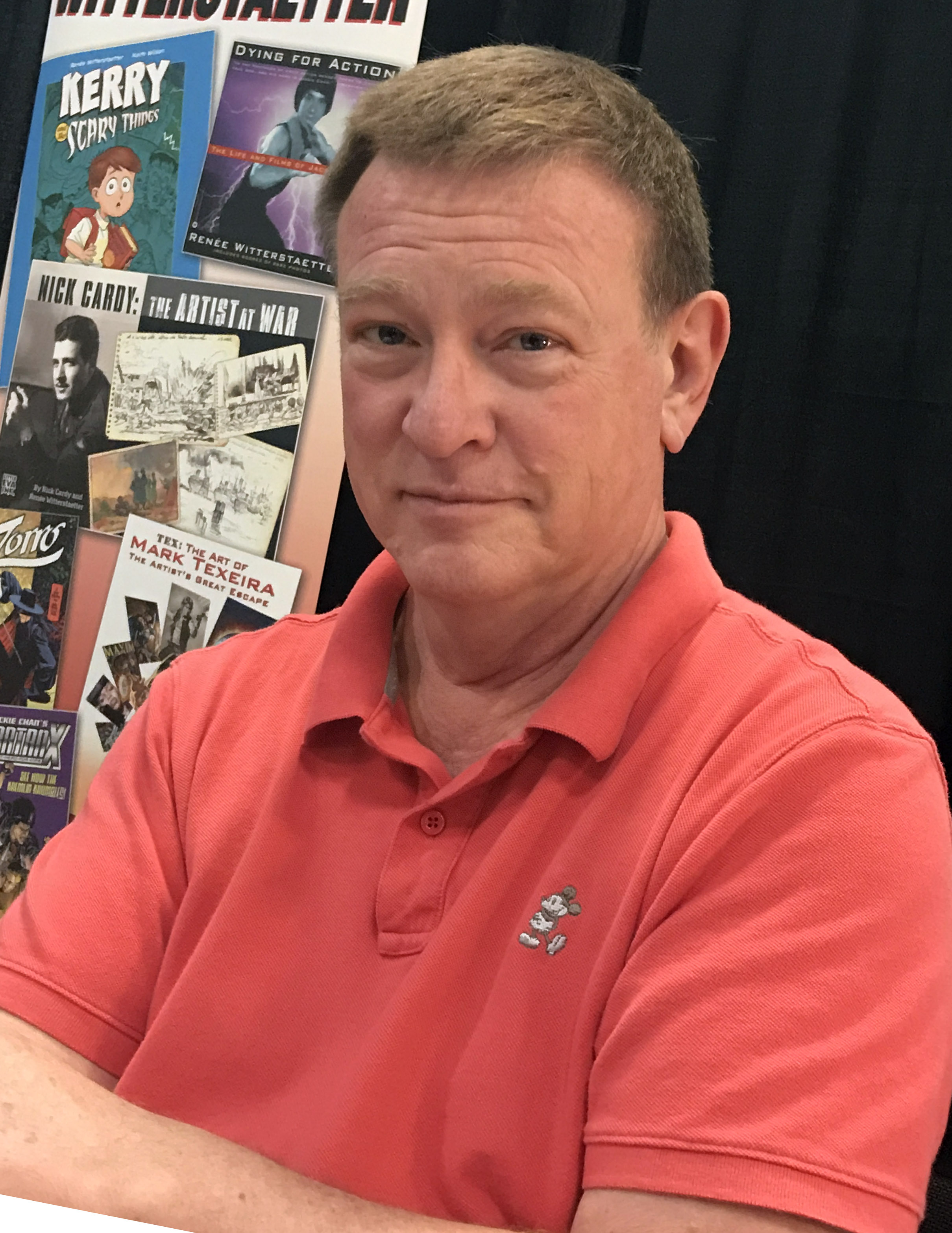
- Golden at the 2018 East Coast Comicon
- Areas: Writer, Artist, Colourist
- Notable works: The Micronauts; The 'Nam; Rogue; Bucky O'Hare

Michael Golden is an American comics artist and writer best known for his late-1970s work on Marvel Comics' The Micronauts and The 'Nam, as well as his co-creation of the characters Rogue and Bucky O'Hare.

His work is known to have influenced the style of artist Arthur Adams.

== Career ==
After starting his illustration career in commercial art, Golden entered the comics industry in late 1977, working on such DC Comics titles as Mister Miracle and Batman Family. His first work for Marvel Comics was "The Cask of Amontillado", a backup story in Marvel Classics Comics #28 (1977) adapting an Edgar Allan Poe short story. In 1978, he collaborated with Bill Mantlo on Marvel's Micronauts which he illustrated for the series' first 12 issues. He drew a number of Marvel series throughout the 1970s and 1980s, including Doctor Strange, the Howard the Duck black-and-white comics magazine, and Marvel Fanfare. Writer Chris Claremont co-created Rogue with Golden in Avengers Annual #10 (1981). At Continuity Comics, Golden and writer Larry Hama introduced Bucky O'Hare in Echo of Futurepast #1 (May 1984). Back at Marvel, The 'Nam series was launched in 1986 by Doug Murray and Golden. Golden drew covers for the licensed series G.I. Joe: A Real American Hero, Rom, U.S. 1, and The Saga of Crystar. Golden also penciled parts of the Marvel No-Prize Book . In the early 1990s, Golden was an editor for DC Comics and later in the decade served as Senior Art Director for Marvel Comics. In the 2000s, he drew covers for DC Comics' Nightwing, Superman: The Man of Steel, and Vigilante. Despite his considerable amount of work in comics, Golden has stated that he still finds advertising and commercial design work to be more fulfilling than comics, because "it's something different each time."

Golden's art style inspired a number of later comics creators, including Arthur Adams and Todd McFarlane. Golden's work was also appropriated by Glenn Danzig as a logo for his bands Samhain and Danzig. He is managed by Renée Witterstaetter (a former comics colorist, writer, and editor) of Eva Ink Publishing.

In a 1997 interview with Wizard magazine, Golden explained that he had not attended a comics convention since 1979, because he is uncomfortable with the cult of personality treatment of comics creators. By the 2000s, however, he had been known to make appearances at conventions.

== Bibliography ==
=== Interior art ===
==== Continuity ====
- Bucky O'Hare #1–2, 4–5 (1991–92)
- Echo of Futurepast (Bucky O'Hare) #1–6 (1984–85)

==== DC Comics ====
- Batman #295 (Note: First work for DC Comics) ("Unsolved Cases of The Batman") #303 (1978)
- Batman Special #1 (1984)
- Batman Family (Man-Bat) #15–17; (Batman) #18–20 (1978)
- Batman: Legends of the Dark Knight Annual #1 (1991)
- Batman: Odyssey #1 (2010)
- Batman: Odyssey vol. 2 #1–2 (2011–2012)
- Birds of Prey #66 (2004)
- DC Special Series (Batman) #15 (1978)
- Deathstroke, The Terminator #12 (1992)
- Detective Comics (The Demon and Bat-Mite stories) #482 (1979)
- Ghosts #67, 88 (1978–1980)
- House of Mystery #257, 259, 266 (1978–1979)
- House of Secrets (Abel) #148–149 (one page each), #151 (1977–1978)
- Justice League Europe Annual #2 (four-pages inks over John Beatty, among other artists) (1991)
- Mister Miracle #23–25 (1978)
- Mystery in Space #113 (1980)
- Secrets of Haunted House #10 (1978)
- Superman: The Man of Steel Gallery #1 (pin-up) (1995)
- Who's Who in the DC Universe (Man-Bat profile) #12; (Blackfire profile) #13 (two pages each) (1991)

==== Marvel Comics ====
- The Avengers Annual #10 (1981)
- Bizarre Adventures #25, 28 (1981)
- Daredevil vol. 2 #65 (five pages, among other artists) (2004)
- Defenders #53–54 (among other artists) (1977)
- Doctor Strange #46, 55 (1981–1982)
- Epic Illustrated #3–4, 32 (1980–1985)
- Fantastic Four Roast #1 (two pages, among other artists) (1982)
- G.I. Joe Yearbook #2 (1986)
- Howard the Duck (black-and-white magazine) #1, 5–6 (1979–1980)
- Marvel Classics Comics #28 (1977) (Note: First work for Marvel Comics)
- Marvel Fanfare #1–2, 4, 45, 47 (1982–1989)
- Marvel Holiday Special (Wolverine) (1992)
- Marvel: Shadows and Light (Doctor Strange) #1 (1997)
- Micronauts #1–12 (1979)
- Mutant X #12 (one pinup) (1999)
- The 'Nam #1–11, 13 (1986–1987)
- Official Handbook of the Marvel Universe #10 (1983)
- Official Handbook of the Marvel Universe Deluxe Edition #12 (1986)
- Savage Tales vol. 2 #1, 4 (five pages) (1985–1986)
- Star-Lord, The Special Edition #1 (framing sequence) (1982)
- Star Wars #38 (1980)
- Uncanny X-Men #273, Annual #7 (1983–1991)

==== Other publishers ====
- Toyboy #7 (1989) (Continuity Comics)
- Jackie Chan's Spartan X: Hell-Bent-Hero-For-Hire #1-4 (1998) (Image Comics)
- Jackie Chan's Spartan X: The Armour of Heaven #1-4 (1997) (Topps Comics)

=== Covers ===
==== DC Comics ====
- Adventures of Superman #590
- Batman #484–485
- Batman: Cyber Revolution #1–2
- Detective Comics #625, 626, 628–631, 633, 644–646
- Nightwing #66–77
- Ocean #1–6 (WildStorm)
- Robo Dojo #1–6 (WildStorm)
- Showcase 93 #4 (1993)
- Superman: The Man of Steel #127–128
- Vigilante #1–4

==== Marvel Comics ====
- Alpha Flight #84
- Cops: The Job #1, 2, 3, 4
- Doctor Strange #42, 43, 44, 55
- Fantastic Four: World's Greatest Comic Magazine #2
- G.I. Joe: A Real American Hero #23, 27, 29, 36, 116-118
- G.I. Joe Yearbook #1, 2
- Marvel No-Prize Book #1
- Micronauts #13–24, 38, 39, 59
- Mutant X #24–31
- New Exiles #1–3
- Nomad vol. 2 #19, 22–25
- Peter Parker: Spider-Man, vol. 2, Annual 2001
- The Punisher vol. 2 #50–51, 53, 58, 86–87, Annual #4
- Punisher Armory #9–10
- The Punisher War Journal #25–30, 40, 61–64
- The Punisher War Zone #17–19, 23–25, Annual #1
- Rom #7–11, 19
- Savage She-Hulk #8–11
- Savage Sword of Conan #98, 101, 105–106, 117, 124, 150
- Savage Tales vol. 2, #1
- The 'Nam #1-13, 39, 42, 66, 79-81
- Transformers #2

==== Other publishers ====
- G.I. Joe: America's Elite #36 (Devil's Due Publishing)
- Out of the Vortex #8 (Dark Horse Comics)
- Team 7: Dead Reckoning #1–4 (Image Comics)
- Union #8–10 (Image Comics)
- The X-Men Companion #1 (Fantagraphics Books)

=== Portfolios and art books ===
- Doctor Strange (Marvel)
- Michael Golden's Jurassic Park Portfolio One (Image/Eva Ink)
- Michael Golden's Jurassic Park Portfolio Two (Image/Eva Ink)
- Michael Golden's Monsters (Image/Eva Ink 2006)
- Excess: The Art of Michael Golden (Vanguard)
- Manga Bucky O'Hare (Vanguard)
- In the Studio with Michael Golden (TwoMorrows)
- Michael Golden: Heroes and Villains (Eva Ink)
- Michael Golden: MORE Heroes and Villains (Eva Ink)
- Michael Golden: Alchemy (Eva Ink)

== Notes ==
| Preceded by n/a | Micronauts artist 1979 | Succeeded by Howard Chaykin |
| Preceded by n/a | The 'Nam artist 1986–1987 | Succeeded by Wayne Vansant |
