= Larry Hama =

American comic book writer, artist

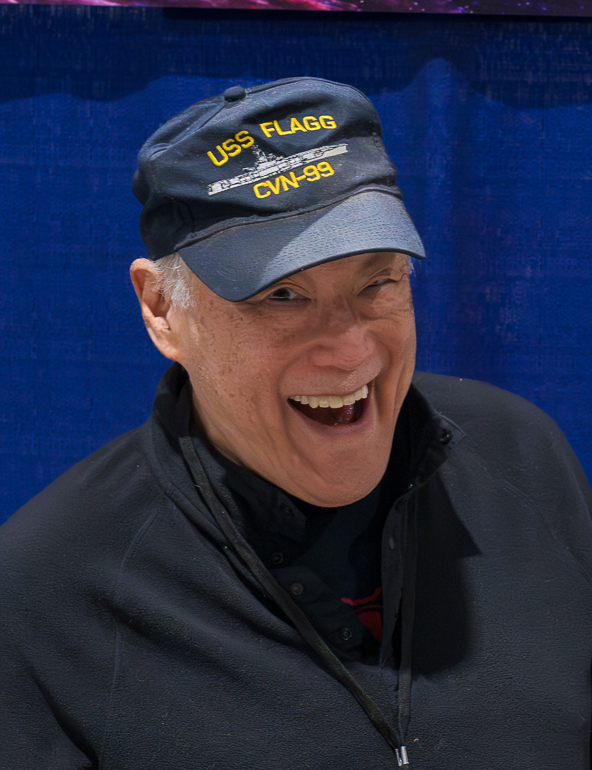
- Hama at GalaxyCon Richmond in 2026
- Born: June 7, 1949 (age 77)
- Areas: Writer, Penciller, Editor
- Notable works: G.I. Joe; Bucky O'Hare; Nth Man; Wolverine
- Awards: Inkpot Award (2012)
- Military career
- Allegiance: United States
- Branch: United States Army
- Service years: 1969–1971
- Units: 18th Engineer Brigade; US Army Corps of Engineers
- Conflicts: Vietnam War

Larry Hama (/ˈhɑːmə/; born June 7, 1949) is an American comic book writer, artist, actor, and musician who has worked in the fields of entertainment and publishing since the 1960s.

During the 1970s, he was seen in minor roles on the TV shows M*A*S*H and Saturday Night Live, and appeared on Broadway in two roles in the original 1976 production of Stephen Sondheim's Pacific Overtures.

He is best known to American comic book readers as a writer and editor for Marvel Comics, where he wrote the licensed comic book series G.I. Joe: A Real American Hero, based on the Hasbro toyline. He has also written for the series Wolverine, Nth Man: The Ultimate Ninja, and Elektra. He co-created the character Bucky O'Hare with Michael Golden, which was developed into a comic book, a toy line and television cartoon.

In October 2024, Hama was inducted into the Harvey Awards Hall of Fame.

== Early life ==
Hama was born June 7, 1949. Growing up, Hama studied Kodokan Judo and later studied Kyūdō (Japanese archery) and Iaido (Japanese martial art swordsmanship). Planning to become a painter, Hama attended Manhattan's High School of Art and Design, where one instructor was former EC Comics artist Bernard Krigstein. He was in the same graduating class as Frank Brunner and Ralph Reese.

== Career ==
=== Early career ===
Hama sold his first comics work to the fantasy film magazine Castle of Frankenstein when he was 16 years old, and he followed by collaborating with Bhob Stewart on pages for the underground tabloid Gothic Blimp Works. After high school, Hama took a job drawing shoes for catalogs, and then served in the United States Army from 1969 to 1971, during the Vietnam War, where he became a firearms and explosive ordnance expert. Hama's experiences in Vietnam informed his editing of the 1986-1993 Marvel Comics series The 'Nam. Upon his discharge, Hama became active in the Asian community in New York City.

High-school classmate Ralph Reese, who had become an assistant to famed EC and Marvel artist Wally Wood, helped Hama get a similar job at Wood's Manhattan studio. Hama assisted on Wood's comic strips Sally Forth and Cannon, which originally ran in Military News and Overseas Weekly. (These were later collected in a series of books.) During this time, Hama had illustrations published in such magazines as Esquire and Rolling Stone, and Reese and he collaborated on art for a story in the underground comix-style humor magazine Drool #1 (1972). Through contacts made while working for Wood, Hama began working at comic-book and commercial artist Neal Adams' Continuity Associates studio; with other young contemporaries there, including Reese, Frank Brunner and Bernie Wrightson, Hama became part of the comic-book inking gang credited as the "Crusty Bunkers." His first known work as such is on the Alan Weiss-penciled "Slaves of the Mahars" in DC Comics' Weird Worlds #2 (Nov. 1972).

Hama began penciling for comics a year-and-a-half later, making an auspicious debut succeeding character co-creator Gil Kane on the feature "Iron Fist" in Marvel Premiere, taking over with the martial arts superhero's second appearance and his next three stories (#16-19, July-Nov. 1974). He went on to freelance for start-up publisher Atlas/Seaboard (writing and penciling the first two issues of the sword & sorcery series Wulf the Barbarian and writing the premiere of the science fiction/horror Planet of Vampires); did some penciling work on the seminal independent comic book Big Apple Comix #1 (Sept. 1975); and drew two issues of the jungle-hero book Ka-Zar for Marvel before beginning a long run at DC Comics.

At DC, Hama became an editor of the titles Wonder Woman, Mister Miracle, Super Friends, and The Warlord, and the TV-series licensed property Welcome Back, Kotter from 1977 to 1978. He then joined Marvel as an editor in 1980.

=== Acting ===
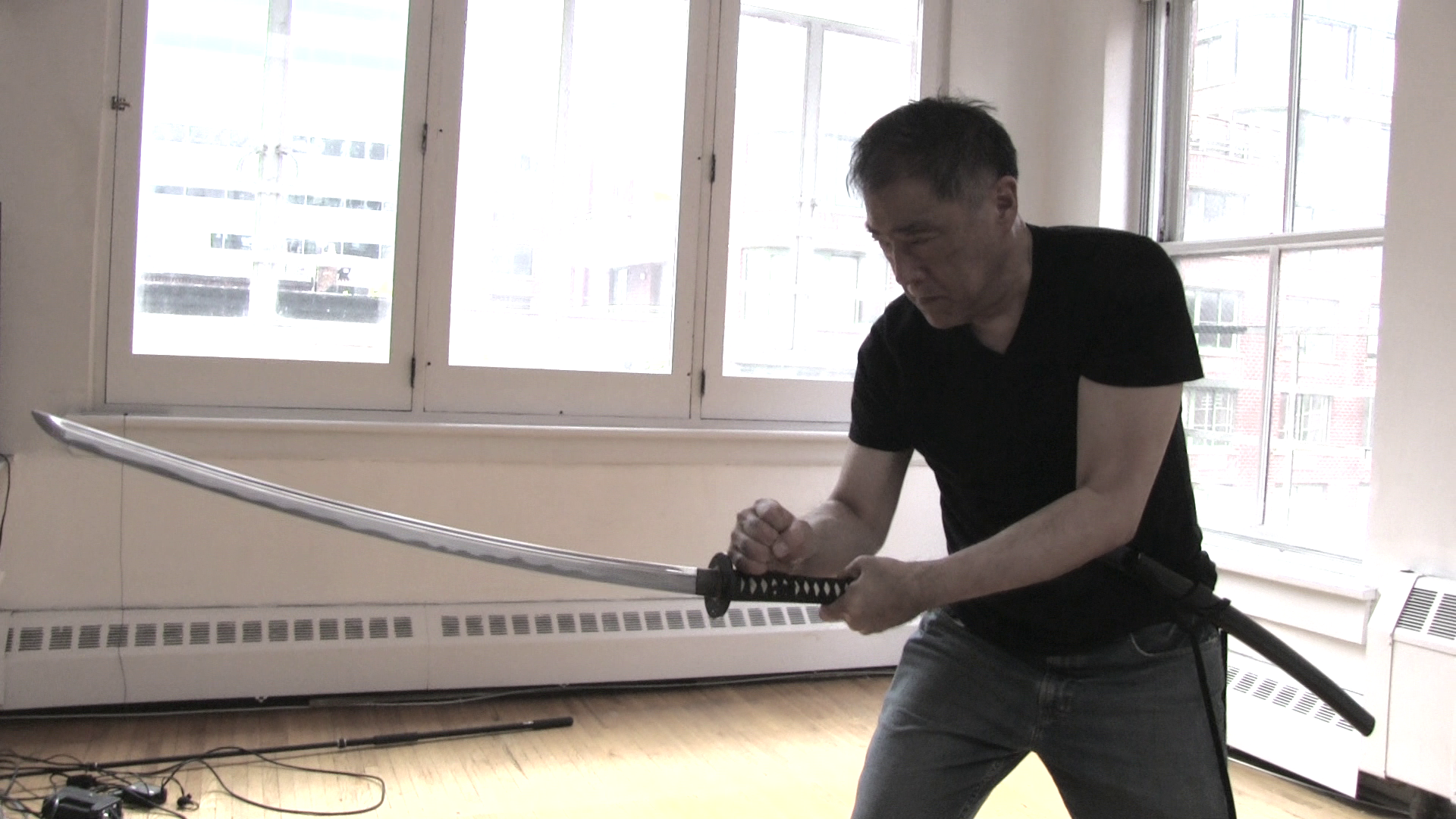
Hama demonstrating sword technique while filming Ghost Source Zero (2017), which he co-wrote.

Hama had a brief acting career in the mid-1970s, despite never having pursued the field. The casting director for the musical Pacific Overtures, Joanna Merlin, called Hama because an actor friend of his gave her his name when asked if he knew any other Asian actors. He told her that he had never acted before and could neither sing nor dance, but Merlin was persistent, and when informed that casting was less than a minute away from his workplace at Continuity Comics, he agreed to audition and was ultimately cast in three roles.

He also played a role in the 1976 M*A*S*H episode "The Korean Surgeon" and a Saturday Night Live spoof of Apocalypse Now. However, though he had made a living as an actor for roughly a year, Hama ultimately discarded his acting career, explaining, "I always basically saw myself as an artist, not as anything else."

=== G.I. Joe ===
Page two of "Silent Interlude".

Hama is best known as the writer of the Marvel Comics licensed series G.I. Joe, based on the Hasbro line of military action figures. Hama said in a 2006 interview that he was given the job by then editor-in-chief Jim Shooter after every other writer at Marvel had turned it down. Hama at the time had recently pitched a Nick Fury: Agent of S.H.I.E.L.D. spin-off series, Fury Force, about a special mission force. Hama used this concept as the back-story for G.I. Joe. He included military terms and strategies, Eastern philosophy, martial arts and historical references from his own background. The comic ran 155 issues (February 1982 – October 1994).

Hama also wrote the majority of the G.I. Joe action figures' file cards—short biographical sketches designed to be clipped from the G.I. Joe and Cobra cardboard packaging. In 2007 these filecards were reprinted in the retro packaging for the G.I. Joe: A Real American Hero 25th Anniversary line.

Hama said in 1986 that G.I. Joe had an unexpected female following due to such strong female characters as Cover Girl, Lady Jaye, and Scarlett (whose personality was based upon his wife). "Most of the girls that write in [with letters to the comic] say that the reason they like the comic is that the women characters are simply part of the team. They're not treated as any different from the other team members. They don't go around with their palms nailed to their foreheads. They're competent, straightforward, and they go ahead and get the job done. They also participate emotionally. They have their likes and dislikes. They're not ill-treated and they're not running around being worrywarts."

Hasbro sculptors sometimes used real people's likenesses when designing its action figures. In 1987, Hasbro released the Tunnel Rat action figure. The character is an explosive ordnance disposal specialist, whose likeness was based on Hama.

In 2006, Hama returned to his signature characters with the Devils Due Publishing miniseries G.I. Joe Declassified, which chronicled the recruitment of the squad's first members by General Hawk. In 2007, the company added the spin-off series Storm Shadow, written by Hama and penciled by Mark A. Robinson, which ceased publication with issue 7.

In December 2007, Hasbro released 25th-anniversary comic-book figure two-packs that featured original stories by Hama. These new Hasbro-published issues were designed to take place between the panels of the Marvel series.

In September 2008, IDW announced a new line of G.I. Joe comics with one series, G.I. Joe Origins, to be primarily written by Hama. He wrote the first five issues, as the series was originally intended to be a miniseries, and returned to write four more issues (including #19, which was a Snake Eyes "silent issue") over the course of the book's 23-issue run. IDW later revived the Marvel Comics continuity with Hama taking the helm of a new ongoing series, picking up where the Marvel series left off with issue #155 1/2.

In June 2023, Skybound announced the continuation of the G.I. Joe: A Real American Hero at Image. This would continue on from the IDW run, starting with issue #301.

=== Other work ===
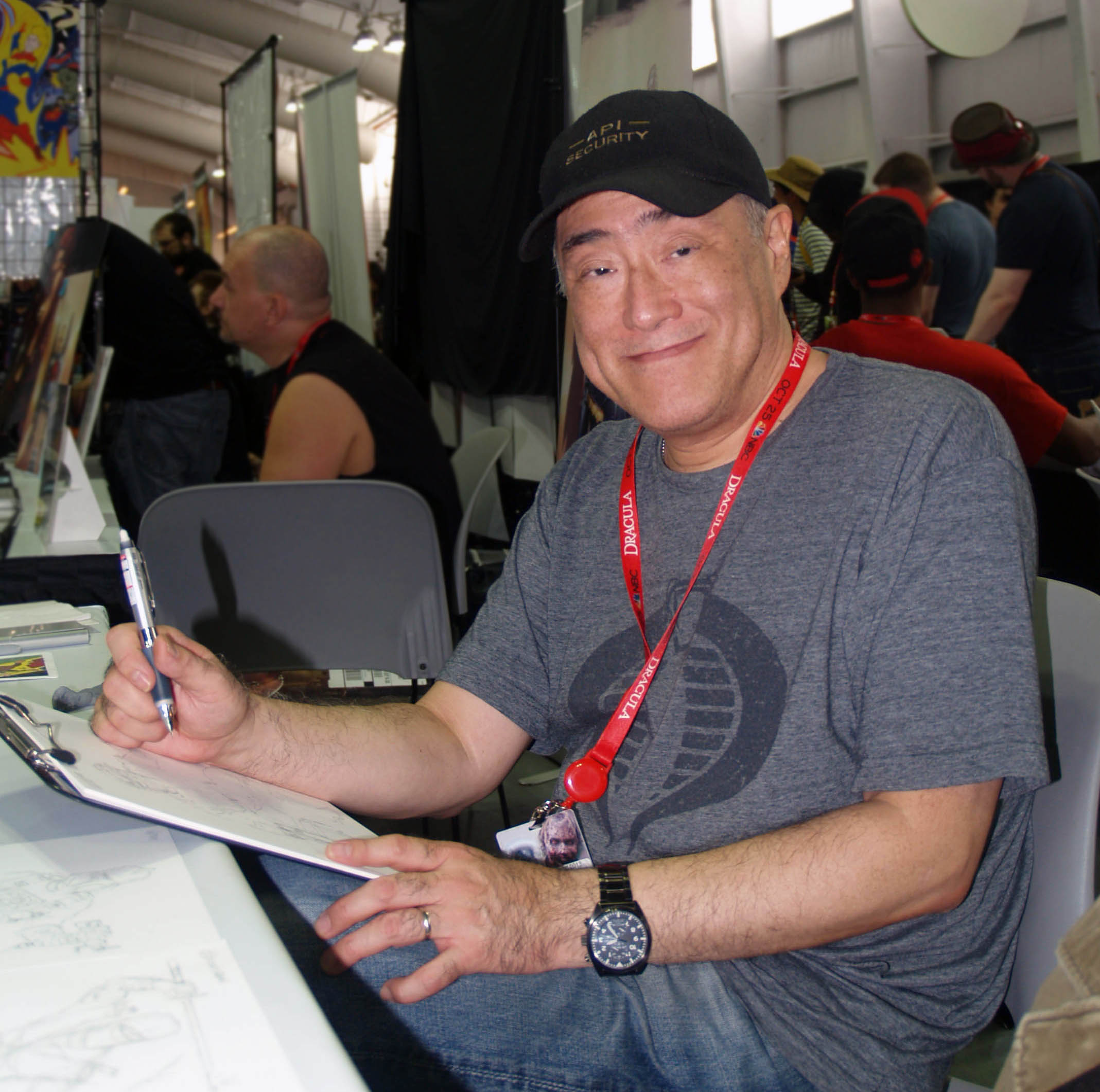
Hama sketching at the 2013 New York Comic Con

At Marvel in the early 1980s, Hama edited the humor magazine Crazy and the Conan titles, and from 1986 to 1993, he edited the acclaimed comic book The 'Nam, a gritty Marvel series about the Vietnam War.

He also was an editor on Peter Porker, The Spectacular Spider-Ham from 1983 to 1987.

Hama wrote the 16-issue Marvel series Nth Man: The Ultimate Ninja (Aug. 1989 - Sept. 1990), concerning the adventures of John Doe, an American ninja and Special Forces commando in an alternate reality in which World War III is sparked after the world's nuclear weapons stockpiles are all destroyed. Hama also edited a relaunch of Marvel's black-and-white comics magazine Savage Tales, overseeing its change from sword-and-sorcery to men's adventure. Other comics Hama has written include Wolverine, Before the Fantastic Four: Ben Grimm and Logan, The Punisher War Zone, and the X-Men brand extension Generation X for Marvel; and Batman stories for DC Comics. His run on Wolverine lasted over seven years, starting with issue #31 and ending with #118. He wrote filecards for Hasbro's line of sci-fi/police action figures, C.O.P.S. 'n' Crooks.

While working at Neal Adams' Continuity Associates, Hama co-developed a series he and comic book artist Michael Golden first created in 1978, Bucky O'Hare, the story of a green anthropomorphic rabbit and his mutant mammal sidekicks in an intergalactic war against space amphibians. Bucky O'Hare went on to become a comic, cartoon, video game, and toy line.

Hama is credited as a writing consultant on the 2004 independent animated film The Easter Egg Adventure and he also contributed scripts to the second season of the animated series Robotboy.

In 2006, Osprey Publishing announced that Hama had been commissioned to write for their "Osprey Graphic History" series of comic books about historical battles, including the titles The Bloodiest Day—Battle of Antietam, and Surprise Attack—Battle of Shiloh (both with artist Scott Moore) and Fight to the Death: Battle of Guadalcanal and Island of Terror—Battle of Iwo Jima (with artist Anthony Williams).

In February 2008, Devil's Due Publishing published Spooks, a comic book about a U.S. government antiparanormal investigator/task force. Hama created the military characters and R.A. Salvatore the monster characters. He was also the writer of DDP's Barack the Barbarian series, a Conan the Barbarian parody starring U. S. President Barack Obama.

On September 19, 2012, Hama released his three-part vampire novel entitled The Stranger.

On December 17, 2012, Hama portrayed himself in a Christmas-themed episode of the Adult Swim series Robot Chicken. In 2014, Hama began working with award-winning filmmaker Mark Cheng on an original film project, called Ghost Source Zero. The film was distributed by Sony Pictures in 2018.

In August 2014, Red Giant Entertainment announced that Hama would be writing the company's new Monster Isle monthly series debuting that November.

On October 11, 2024, the Harvey Awards announced that Hama was one of five comics creators to be inducted into the Harvey Awards Hall of Fame at the 36th annual Harvey Awards ceremony on October 18 at the New York Comic Con. The other four inductees were Arthur Adams, Akira Toriyama, Sergio Aragonés, and John Buscema. Hama reacted to the accolade by stating, "I am deeply honored to be inducted into the Harvey Awards Hall of Fame. I first met Harvey Kurtzman in 1966, when as a student at the High School of Art and Design, I would visit the office of HELP! magazine. He and art director Terry Gilliam were extremely kind to this nerdy fanboy cartoonist wannabe, and opened flat-file drawers to show me original art by R. Crumb, Willy Elder, John Severin, Jack Davis, and many others. His open, welcoming nature made me feel that my goals were not as unreachable as I feared them to be.”

== Bibliography ==
=== As writer ===
==== BOOM! Studios ====
- The Center Holds #1-4

==== Continuity Comics ====
- Echo of Futurepast #1-6 (Bucky O'Hare segments only)

==== Dark Horse Comics ====
- Call of Duty: Black Ops III #1-6

==== DC Comics ====
- Batman #575-581
- Batman: Legends of the Dark Knight #121-122
- Batman: Shadow of the Bat #90
- Batman: Toyman #1-4
- Convergence: Batman: Shadow of the Bat #1-2
- Convergence: Wonder Woman #1-2
- Detective Comics #736
- Spy Hunter & Paper Boy #1-6
- Unknown Soldier #211

==== Devil's Due Publishing ====
- Barack the Barbarian #1-5
- Barack the Barbarian: The Fall of Red Sarah! #1
- G.I. Joe: Declassified (Devil's Due) #1-3
- G.I. Joe: Frontline (Devil's Due) #1-4
- Snake Eyes: Declassified (Devil's Due), trade paperback (five-page story: "Silent Prelude")
- Storm Shadow (Devil's Due) #1-7

==== IDW Publishing ====
- G.I. Joe (IDW) #0 (five-page story)
- G.I. Joe: A Real American Hero (IDW) #155.5, 156–300
- G.I. Joe: A Real American Hero: 40th Anniversary Special #1
- G.I. Joe: A Real American Hero Annual (IDW) 2012
- G.I. Joe: A Real American Hero – Cobra World Order Prelude #1
- G.I. Joe: A Real American Hero: Yearbook 2019
- G.I. Joe: A Real American Hero: Silent Option (IDW) #1-4
- G.I. Joe: Origins (IDW) #1-5, 8–10, 19

==== Image Comics ====
- G.I. Joe: A Real American Hero (Skybound) #301-Present
- G.I. Joe: A Real American Hero #1 Larry Hama Cut

==== Marvel Comics ====
- Avengers #326-333
- Before the Fantastic Four: Ben Grimm and Logan #1-3
- Cable #16
- Conan the Barbarian #117, 221, 224
- Conan #1-7, 10–11
- Daredevil #193
- Daredevil & Captain America: Dead on Arrival #1
- Elektra #14-19
- Generation X #33-44, 46–47, #1/2
- Ghost Rider / Blaze: Spirits of Vengeance #11
- G.I. Joe: A Real American Hero (Marvel) :
  - G.I. Joe: A Real American Hero (Marvel) #1-7 (6-7 - dialogue only), 10–19, 21–118, 120–142, 144–152, 155
  - G.I. Joe: Order of Battle (Marvel) #1-4
  - G.I. Joe: Special Missions (Marvel), issues 1-23, 25, 27–28
  - G.I. Joe Yearbook (Marvel) #1-4
- Iron Fist: Heart of the Dragon (Marvel) #1-6
- James Bond For Your Eyes Only #1-2
- Kitty Pryde, Agent of S.H.I.E.L.D. (Marvel) #1-3
- Marvel Comics Presents #25
- Marvel Graphic Novel: Wolfpack
- Marvel Holiday Special 1992
- Maverick #1
- Mort the Dead Teenager #1-4
- Onslaught Epilogue #1
- The Punisher War Zone #20-25
- Sabretooth #1-4
- Spider-Man Team-Up #6
- Spider-Man: The Venom Agenda #1
- Star Wars #48
- Team X/Team 7
- Venom:
  - Venom: Along Came A Spider #1-4
  - Venom: Carnage Unleashed #1-4
  - Venom: Finale #1-3
  - Venom: The Hunted #1-3
  - Venom: License To Kill #1-3
  - Venom: Sinner Takes All #1-5
  - Venom: Tooth and Claw #1-3
  - Venom: On Trial #1-3
- Weapon X #1-4
- What If...? Dark: Carnage #1
- Wild Thing #1-5
- Wolfpack #1-3
- Wolverine :
  - 2020 iWolverine #1-2
  - Logan: Black, White & Blood #1
  - Wolverine (vol. 2) #-1, 31–43, 45–57, 60–109, 111–118, Annual #1995
  - Wolverine (vol. 7) #50
  - Wolverine: Patch #1-5
- X-Men: Age of Apocalypse One Shot #1
- X-Men Annual 1996
- X-Men Legends #7-9
- X-Men Unlimited #9

==== Other publishers ====
- Bat-Thing one-shot (Amalgam Comics)
- G.I. Joe: A Real American Hero Comic Packs (2008) (Hasbro) #21B, 32.5, 36.5, 4-12 (Note: There were no issues #1-3 to this series. The first three issues were written to accompany the A Real American Hero issues #21, 32 and 36 originally written for Marvel.)
- G.I. Joe: Battle Corps (Hasbro) #1-4 (with Paul Kirchner)
- G.I. Joe: A Real American Hero Comic Packs (2009) (Hasbro) #1-2, 4-6 (Resolute) (Note: Issue #4 ("Who Owns the Night?") was a Wal-Mart exclusive; #5 ("Final Test") was an Amazon.com exclusive available for download only; #6 ("Splash-Bang") was an Amazon mail-in exclusive. Issue #3 ("Cold Comfort") was never released.)
- G.I. Joe vs. Cobra (Hasbro), issues 1-6 (Note: This series is continued in G.I. Joe: Valor vs. Venom #7-10.)
- G.I. Joe vs. Cobra (Fun Publications) #1 (with David S. Lane)
- G.I. Joe: Valor vs. Venom (Hasbro) #7-10 (Note: This series picks up after Hasbro's G.I. Joe vs. Cobra #6.)
- Legends of the Dark Claw one-shot (Amalgam Comics)
- The Stranger #1-3

==== As artist ====
- 2010 (1985) #1-2
- Damage (Vol. 2) #6-7 (pencil breakdowns)
- Daredevil (Marvel) #197 (pencil breakdowns)
- Deathstroke (Vol. 4) #2, 6–8, 12, 15–16, 19-20 (pencil breakdowns)
- G.I. Joe: A Real American Hero (Marvel) #21, 26, 35 (partial), 36 (partial)
- Marvel Premiere #16-19
- Men of War #8, 15
- Star Wars #45 (cover)
- The Empire Strikes Back Monthly #140 (cover)

==== As writer and artist ====
- Nth Man: The Ultimate Ninja (Marvel) #1-16 (story and cover layouts)
- Wulf the Barbarian #1-2

==== As editor ====
- Dakota North #1-5
- DC Showcase (Vol. 1) #101-103
- Jonah Hex (Vol. 1) #8-10, 12–19
- Machine Man 2020 (Vol. 1) #1-2
- Mark Hazzard: Merc #6-11
- Peter Porker, The Spectacular Spider-Ham (Marvel) #1-17
- Semper Fi #1, 6
- Super Friends #9-15, 29
- The 'Nam #1-10
- Warlord #10-15

== Notes ==
Preceded by Fabian Nicieza (main stories); Mark Gruenwald (back-up stories)	The Avengers writer 1990–1991	Succeeded by Bob Harras
Preceded by Jo Duffy	Wolverine writer 1990–1997	Succeeded by Warren Ellis
Preceded by James Robinson	Generation X writer 1997–1999	Succeeded by Jay Faerber
Preceded by Doug Moench	Batman writer 2000	Succeeded by Ed Brubaker
