= Starblaze Graphics =

American publishing company

- Industry: Comics, illustrated books
- Founded: 1978
- Defunct: 1989
- Headquarters: Virginia Beach, Virginia
- Owner: The Donning Company

Starblaze Graphics was an imprint of The Donning Company, a publishing company established in 1978 to publish illustrated books in the United States. Notable Starblaze publications include Robert Asprin's MythAdventures series, as well as two trade paperbacks collecting the series based on the first book. Donning also published a graphic version of the Thieves' World shared world anthology series, with art by Tim Sale.

Starblaze also published compilation reprints of the comics series Elfquest by Wendy and Richard Pini and A Distant Soil by Colleen Doran. The Pinis later sued Starblaze for continuing to publish Elfquest, and attempting to re-secure the rights to the A Distant Soil series. Starblaze countersued; the dispute was settled in 1988. A dozen Starblaze authors also sued Donning/Starblaze after the company folded the Starblaze division in 1989 and sold contracts and rights to multiple book properties to Schiffer Publishing.

Starblaze ceased operation in 1989, but the initial publications of MythAdventures novels M.Y.T.H. Inc. in Action (1990) and Sweet Myth-Tery of Life (1993) carried the Starblaze imprint.

== Titles published ==
- Aria Takes Off (1986), translating Le Tribunal des corbeaux (1982).
- Buck Godot: Zap Gun for Hire (1986), collects three previously published Buck Godot stories along with one original.
- Buck Godot: PSmith (1987), an original graphic novel.
- The Colors of Space (1988), a graphic novel based on the 1963 book by Marion Zimmer Bradley.
- Cobalt 60 (1988), collects the story serialized in Epic Illustrated #27–31 (December 1984–August 1985).
- A Distant Soil: Immigrant Song (1987)
- A Distant Soil: Knights of the Angel (1989)
- Duncan & Mallory (1986)
- Duncan & Mallory: The Bar-None Ranch (1987)
- Duncan & Mallory: The Raiders (1987)
- ElfQuest, Books 1–4 (1981–1984), collecting color versions of ElfQuest v1, #1–20 (1978–1984).
- Fortune's Friends: Hell Week (1986)
- Gates of Ivrel: Claiming Rights (1986)
- Gates of Ivrel: Fever Dreams (1987)
- Lightrunner (1983)
- Mage: The Hero Discovered, Volumes 1–3 (1987), collecting Mage v1, #1–0 (1984–1986)
- Metropolis (1988), a graphic novel of the 1927 film.
- A Midsummer Night's Dream (1988), a graphic novel of the Shakespeare play.
- MythAdventures (1978–1993), the first ten novels.
- Myth Adventures One (1985), collects #1–4 of the WaRP Graphics series.
- Myth Adventures Two (1986), collects #5–8 of the WaRP Graphics series.
- Robotech Art 1 (1986), "The Official Guide to the Robotech Universe."
- Robotech Art 2 (1987), "New Illustrations and Original Art from The Robotech Universe."
- Robotech Art 3: The Sentinels (1988), a look at Robotech II: The Sentinels.
- Some Will Not Die (1978), reprint of 1961 novel by Algis Budrys with illustrations
- The Stones of Nomuru (1988), the L. Sprague de Camp and Catherine Crook de Camp novel.
- The Thief of Bagdad (1987), a graphic novel based on the 1924 film.
- Thieves' World Graphics, Volumes 1–6 (1985–1987)
- Thieves World Graphics (1986), collects volumes 1–3 of Thieves World Graphics
- On the Good Ship Enterprise: My 15 Years with Star Trek (1982)
