= A Distant Soil =

Comic book series

- Cover of the first graphic novel collection, Image Comics definitive edition.

Publication information
- Publisher: WaRP Graphics (1983–1985); Starblaze Graphics (1987–1989); Aria Press (1991–1995); Image Comics (1996–present)
- Format: Ongoing series
- Genre: Science fiction
- Publication date: Aria Press/Image Comics definitive edition June 1991
- No. of issues: 42 (Image Comics)
- Main character(s): Jason; Liana

Creative team
- Created by: Colleen Doran
- Written by: Colleen Doran
- Artist: Colleen Doran
- Penciller: Colleen Doran
- Inker(s): Image; Colleen Doran
- Letterer(s): Image; Colleen Doran
- Editor(s): Image; Jim Valentino

Collected editions
- The Gathering: ISBN 978-1607067870

A Distant Soil is an epic space opera comic book series published by American company Image Comics, combining science fiction and fantasy with Arthurian themes. It is written and illustrated by Colleen Doran.

"A forerunner of queer-friendly comics and space opera...," "A Distant Soil was something that really had not been seen before – a New Age take on science fiction with gorgeous costumes, young siblings with an unknown destiny, a blinding mix of magic with technology...fantasy and alien ships combine under Doran's ethereal watch."

The story, which Doran created at the age of twelve, centers on a young girl who is born heir to an alien religious dynasty, and explores issues of politics, gender identity, and tolerance. A Distant Soil is among the first US graphic novels created solely by a female writer/artist, appearing in fanzines when the artist was still in high school. A Distant Soil is also notable for being among the earliest comics to feature openly gay characters, and for featuring a gay couple as romantic leads. The series gained a Gaylactic Spectrum Award nomination for Best Other Work in 2001.

It was recommended as a graphic novel of interest to improve reading skills for "reluctant readers" in Library Media Connection . The Voice of Youth Advocates profiled the book in their quarterly journal, stating that one of Doran's influences for A Distant Soil was the 1978 Samuel R. Delany/Howard Chaykin graphic novel Empire.

It is one of the earliest American comics to display the influence of manga (Japanese storytelling techniques), though Doran does not consider A Distant Soil to be OEL (original English language manga).

The series was a top ten nominee in the 2004 Comics Buyer's Guide Fan Awards, with Doran nominated as Favorite Penciler, Favorite Inker, Favorite Cover Artist, and A Distant Soil nominated for Favorite Comic Book.

Comics Book Resources wrote "...It's amazing how Doran's work now seems right in tune with stuff like Hunger Games and the Divergent series, and yet when she was starting this series, there WEREN'T stories out there starring female characters. There weren't epic space operas about teenage girls. She practically created the genre."

The British Science Fiction Association's journal Vector listed A Distant Soil among six groundbreaking science fiction comics, singular for "...being a little ahead of its time." and for "...the sheer diversity on display. Not only are the alien races reflective of the various skin colours humans have, but even within one alien race characters have different skin colours – something surprisingly rare within sequential science fiction. The book also features gay relationships without it being a big old deal."

In Comics: A Global History, 1968 to the Present, Dan Mazur and Alexander Danner wrote of A Distant Soil's "...kitchen sink approach to genre, combining elements of space opera, Arthurian legend, romantic drama, and complex political maneuvering....Doran admirably bucks the fantasy genre's tendency to make the heroic leader a seemingly indestructible warrior. ..Seren is a politically powerless but well-intentioned puppet of other actors...a volatile mix of melodramatic temper, moral righteousness, and lonely stunted child, simultaneously noble and deeply damaged."

== Plot summary ==
On a world called Ovanan, an alien race of immortal and androgynous beings who possess psionic powers is ruled by a corrupt government unit called the Hierarchy. The Hierarchy uses their power to control the Avatar, a singular being who is able to amass all of the psionic power of the Ovanan people and wield that power as a weapon called The Collective. To cement their control over Ovanan and the Avatar, the Hierarchy also uses the Avatar to act as an angelic religious figure who stands in judgment of Ovanan children. The Avatar chooses who lives and dies, supposedly for religious purposes. In actuality, he selectively kills anyone who may mature into a threat to the Hierarchy's power base. Sometimes these undesirables are allowed to live as an Ovanan underclass, who are called Variants.

An Ovanan man, Aeren, who was raised in the Avatar's household, was secretly allowed to live, despite having an undesirable and dangerous ability: he is a Disruptor, the opposite of the Avatar. While the Avatar gathers and magnifies psionic energy, a Disruptor disrupts energy. This ability can be used in many ways: to stop a heart, cause electrical disruptions in machinery, or to open any lock.

Aeren was secretly involved with the Avatar Etan and his young heir Seren. However, after the suspicious death of the Etan, Aeren escaped to Earth, where he married a human woman and fathered five children, of which two survived: Liana and Jason, 15 and 17, who are born with powers they don't understand and can't control.

Incarcerated in a mental hospital where they are the subjects of study, Jason becomes suspicious of the Institute's motives, and urges Liana to run away. During their escape, they become separated.

Liana encounters a group of humans and an Ovanan man, and his companion, D'mer, also Rieken's lover, who hails from another planet called Kimar, which is under Hierarchy rule. Liana learns that she is an Avatar, and has the powers of the Ovanan godhead. However, her powers interfere with the ability of the Avatar, who currently sits on the Ovanan throne, to control the Collective, and if she is not eliminated, Ovanan is vulnerable as the Avatar is their greatest weapon.

Rieken and D'mer go on a quest to find more humans who will help them save Liana, and to prevent Ovanan from exercising power over Earth. In addition to drawing in several humans, they discover a beautiful Ovanan exile named Bast, who was once one of the Avatar's acolytes. Also, they encounter magical beings from Arthurian myth. The implication is that myth and legend is a kind of Earth Collective, a manifestation of human will that has taken a different form than the psionic energy of Ovanan.

Jason, meanwhile, is captured by the Hierarchy and tortured by the beautiful but evil Sere. Believing him to be dead, his captors dispose of his body, but he is actually in a drug-induced coma. He is rescued by the Resistance, which is working with Rieken to try to stage a coup and overthrow the Hierarchy.

Unknown to Jason and his companions, Rieken is really Seren, the Avatar in disguise, who has quietly been working behind the scenes to try to overthrow the shackles of the oppressive Hierarchy. With Liana on one side, and Jason on another, the two groups rush to a confrontation.

== Characters ==
=== Hunter Liana Scott ===
A fifteen-year-old girl who is born with the power of the Avatar. She has red hair and yellow eyes, and a very small frame. Having been incarcerated in a mental hospital most of her life, she has social skill problems, and is seemingly childlike and innocent, but clever. While her first name is Hunter, she is always referred to as Liana.

=== Jason Scott ===
Seventeen years old, Jason is born with the power of a disruptor. For most of his life, he did not realize he had this power, an ability which makes him a dangerous weapon. He has blond hair and blue eyes, and is of medium height. Jason is protective of his sister, and has anger management issues.

=== Rieken/Seren ===
Seren is the young Avatar of Ovanan. He has white hair, pale bluish eyes, and is androgynous. He is about seventy years old, which is young for an Ovanan. As a boy, he accidentally absorbed the personality of Rieken, the leader of the Ovanan Resistance. Rieken died, and now Seren uses the personality, and an enhancer to change his appearance, to fight with the Resistance as Rieken.

=== D'mer ad D'aniri ===
D'mer is an enslaved hostage of a minor royal family from the planet Kimar. He is a member of the Avatar's household. He has psionic abilities, pyrokinetics and the ability to fly. He has reddish hair, black eyes, is considered quite handsome, and has a sarcastic sense of humor. He and the Avatar are lovers.

=== Kovar ===
The Avatar's Shield, a psionic ward. Once the prince of House Teramis, the military race of Ovanan, Kovar gave up his throne out of religious devotion to the Avatar. He is extremely tall and strong, has pale skin, grey eyes, and black hair.

=== Bast ===
Once an acolyte of the House of the Avatar, Bast is a beautiful exile who possesses the power to change her shape. It is implied, but never stated, that she is the inspiration for the Egyptian cat goddess. She has black hair and green eyes.

=== Antonio Minetti ===
A human policeman who finds Liana in an alley, and falsely believes he has to rescue her from a gang. He agrees to aid Rieken in his fight against the Hierarchy.

=== Brent Donewitz ===
A teenaged boy, Hawaiian and Jewish, who is the first to encounter Liana after she escapes the Institute.

=== Niniri ===
The leader of the Hierarchy. Deceptively beautiful and calm, she is extremely manipulative.

== Publication history ==
Work from A Distant Soil was originally published in several fanzines, and was scouted by The Donning Company's Starblaze Graphics editions before being contracted by WaRP Graphics. Doran left after nine issues due to an acrimonious dispute with WaRP, which was accused of attempting to claim copyright and trademark on her work. The WaRP version of the story has never been reprinted, despite its unusual all-pencil style, although in one collected volume of the new series Doran reprinted the short Distant Soil story "R & R" that appeared in a WaRP anthology.

After leaving WaRP, Doran discarded all 300 pages of work and redid the series from scratch, initially for Starblaze Graphics, the company which first approached Doran for publication rights when she was in high school.

Colleen Doran and twelve other creators, including science fiction artist David Cherry and New Age author Mary Summer Rain, sued Donning for copyright violation and fraud. She chronicled the battle in Very Bad Publishers, blog posts which earned praise from an array of comics industry notables such as Tom Spurgeon at The Comics Reporter and Frank Miller. Doran wrote that, once again, she retained all rights to her series, and received a non-disclosed settlement.

Doran's experiences established her as a prominent artist spokesperson, eventually landing her in Washington, DC, working as a lobbyist for creator rights.

When parent corporation The Donning Company folded Starblaze Graphics, Doran self-published under the Aria Press imprint, reprinting earlier work and creating new work. The ending of the Cold War necessitated some minor revision to political references in early chapters. She fleshed out earlier scenes and added new ones, as well as a backstory series Seasons of Spring, the story of A Distant Soil's protagonists as children.

Doran was a core member of the fledgling self-publishing movement with Cerebus creator Dave Sim, Bone creator Jeff Smith, and Strangers in Paradise creator Terry Moore. They toured the US and Canada under the Spirits of Independence banner, pushing for greater recognition and rights for self publishers.

In 1996, Doran continued the series at Image Comics, where it is now in multiple printings as a series of trade paperbacks. It is 42 out of 50 issues into its final storyline, as a 1000-page single, long-form story narrative. It has sold, collectively, more than 700,000 copies.

A Distant Soil spawned trading cards, fanzines, pinup books, limited editions, prints and posters, a fan club, and its creator has appeared in numerous documentaries and interviews. It was also optioned for film and television, with interest from Energy Entertainment and David Uslan.

The series was on hiatus from 2006 to 2013, after its printer lost the archives of the photographic negatives of the graphic novels. The series returned in 2013 from Image Comics, with the first digitally restored edition premiering in July 2013. Jim Valentino's Shadowline imprint took on the restored editions and redesign tasks. Graphic artist Allan Harvey completed the majority of the restoration work.

== Collected editions ==
The series has been collected into a number of trade paperbacks:

At The Donning Company the volumes were:

- Volume 1: Immigrant Song (collects A Distant Soil #1–4, 68 pages, The Donning Company, April 1989, ISBN 0-89865-514-5)
- Volume 2: Knights of the Angel (collects A Distant Soil #5–9, 120 pages, The Donning Company, April 1989, ISBN 0-89865-557-9)

The Image Comics collections are:

- Volume 1: The Gathering (collects A Distant Soil #1–13, 240 pages, Image Comics, June 1999, ISBN 1-887279-51-2)
- Volume 2: The Ascendant (collects A Distant Soil #13–25, 240 pages, Image Comics, November 1998, ISBN 1-58240-018-0)
- Volume 3: The Aria (collects A Distant Soil #26–31, 164 pages, Image Comics, July 2001, ISBN 1-58240-201-9)
- Volume 4: The Coda (collects A Distant Soil #32–38, 184 pages, Image Comics, softcover, March 2006, ISBN 1-58240-478-X, hardcover, November 2005, ISBN 1-58240-525-5)

Digitally Restored editions:

- A Distant Soil: The Gathering TPB Volume I Image Comics/Shadowline (2013) digitally remastered compilation of issues 1–13 with new story content ISBN 978-1607067870
- A Distant Soil: The Ascendant TPB Volume II Image Comics/Shadowline (2014) digitally remastered compilation of issues 14–25 with new story content ISBN 978-1607068341
