= Planetary Brigade =

- The Planetary Brigade, artist Matt Haley

Publication information
- Publisher: Boom! Studios
- Format: Limited series
- Publication date: 2006
- Main character(s): Captain Valor; Earth Goddess; Grim Knight; Mauve Visitor; Mister Brilliant; Purring Pussycat; Third Eye

Creative team
- Created by: Keith Giffen (writer); J.M. DeMatteis (writer); Joe Abraham (artist)

Planetary Brigade is a comic book series published by Boom! Studios. It was created by Keith Giffen, J.M. DeMatteis and Joe Abraham. Originally a two-issue mini-series, Planetary Brigade is a sister book to Hero Squared, and shares some of the same characters.

== History ==
=== First mini-series ===
- In issue #1 we travel back to a time before the events of Hero Squared #1 and are introduced to "the most amazing collection of heroes ever assembled", the Planetary Brigade. As the story begins we discover a serious threat from another universe is about to emerge, and several members of the Brigade are already on the scene.
- In issue #2 the heroine known as Third Eye senses a magical disturbance, and her Planetary Brigade teammates Mr. Brilliant and the Purring Pussycat manage to set aside their verbal jousting for a short time to stumble upon the source of the trouble. A man who is being used as a portal so that extra-dimensional demons can enter "our" universe from an infernal realm. As the team gathers to fight the hordes, the Third Eye faces the difficult task of the closing the portal.

=== Planetary Brigade: Origins ===
A three-issue series title Planetary Brigade: Origins appeared in 2006–2007. The first issue showed the first time the team's founding members fought together, and the origin of their nemesis Mister Master. The second and third issues showed the backstory of Purring Pussycat, who reveals hidden depths that were not obvious from the earlier two-issue series. The flashback sequence in the second issue takes place before the original miniseries, while the third issue takes place afterward.

=== Trades and collections ===
Both miniseries were collected in the 2007 trade paperback titled Planetary Brigade. They were also included, along with the various Hero Squared series, in Hero Squared Omnibus (2017).

== Member profiles ==
- Captain Valor - Real name Milo Stone. The moral compass of the group, stuck pointing to the 1960s. Valor has old-fashioned superhero ideals.
- Earth Goddess - Six foot eight inches tall she's like Storm and Wonder Woman slapped together, literally: from the waist up, her right side is black, and her left is white. Lisa was chosen to be the human vessel for the conscience of Gaia, the earth mother. Earth Goddess is a fierce warrior in battle, using her superstrength, flight and orb.
- Grim Knight - Stephen wields the enchanted Excalibur sword and rides his enchanted horse, Guinevere. The team's pessimist, sadist and token sociopath.
- Mauve Visitor - A member of the alien Prissuvian race, his vessel was shot down by the US military four years ago, and he has since been living off their budget, pretending to do superhero work. He has a crush on Mr Brilliant.
- Mister Brilliant - Cybernetically augmented senses, a genius intellect, and an "Ultichair" with enough firepower to take down several small nations. Mr Brilliant lives in a comic shop and publishes his adventures in his own comic book.
- Purring Pussycat - She's a reformed supervillain, a former protégé of Mister Master, the team's original nemesis. Feral powers.
- Third Eye - A powerful mystic and teleporter. She can transport her consciousness onto another hero, but it leaves her body unconscious and vulnerable. She has a habit of materializing in a room without even a warning puff of smoke. Third Eye was kidnapped as a baby and raised by demons. She is the realist of the group, the one who knows what must be done and is prepared to take on the burden of that responsibility.

== Resources ==
- Giffen and DeMatteis interview about Hero Squared, Newsarama
