= Colleen Doran =

American writer-artist and cartoonist

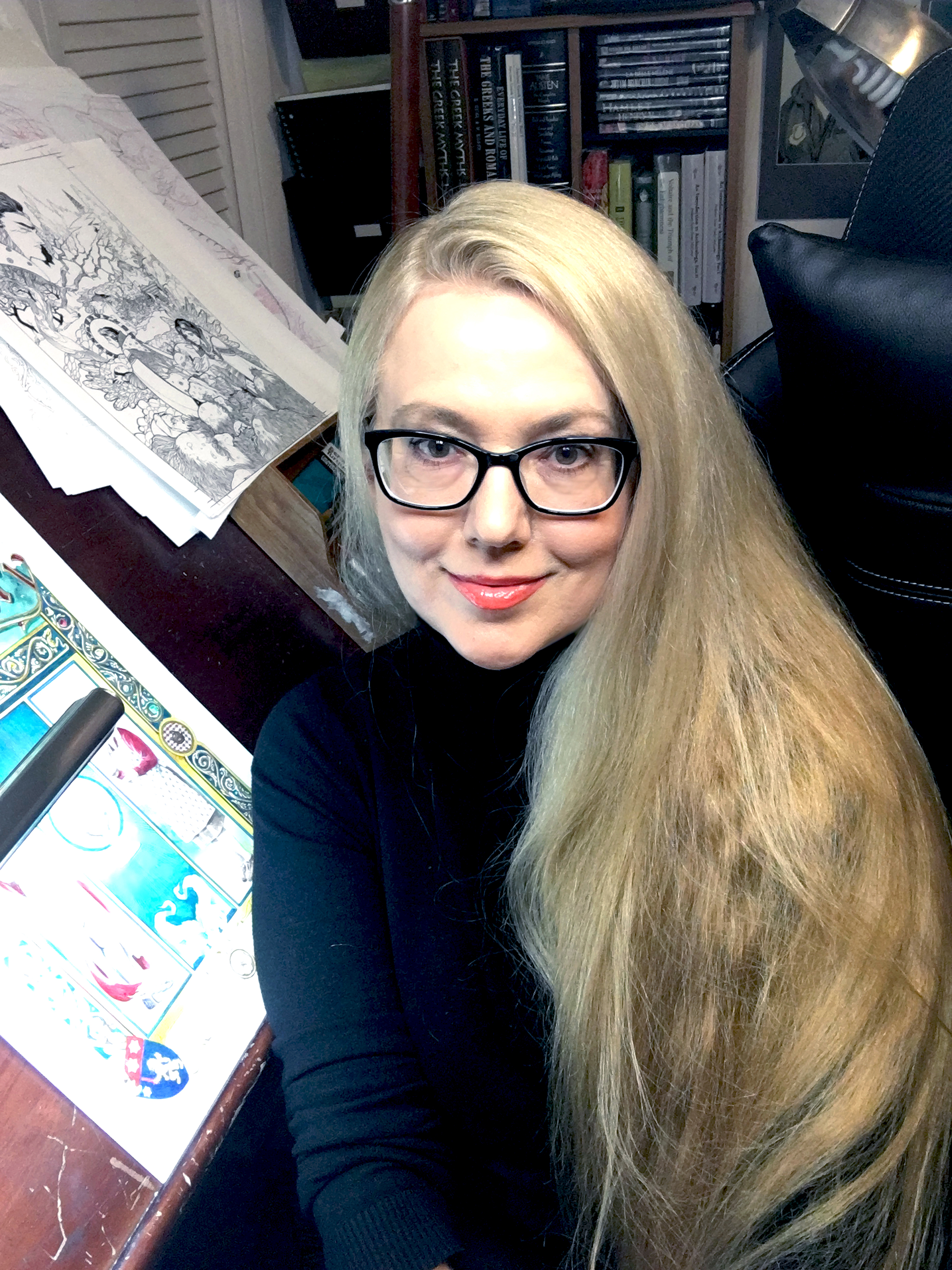
- Colleen Doran in her studio, January 2021, with original art from Neil Gaiman's "Chivalry" and "Snow, Glass, Apples".
- Born: July 24, 1964 (age 62)
- Areas: Writer, Penciller, Inker, Letterer, Colourist
- Notable works: The Sandman, The Amazing Spider-Man, A Distant Soil, Orbiter, The Legion of Superheroes,Wonder Woman, Neil Gaiman's Snow Glass Apples
- Awards: Eisner Award, Best Adaptation from Another Medium, Neil Gaiman's Chivalry Locus Award, Best Illustrated and Art Book, Neil Gaiman's Chivalry; Eisner Award Best Adaptation From Another Medium, Neil Gaiman's Snow, Glass, Apples; Bram Stoker Award, Superior Achievement in a Graphic Novel, Neil Gaiman's Snow, Glass, Apples; Ringo Award Best Graphic Novel, Neil Gaiman's Snow, Glass, Apples Will Eisner Hall of Fame

S.H.I.E.L.D. No. 4 variant cover. An example of Colleen Doran's art for Marvel Comics

Colleen Doran (born July 24, 1964) is an American writer-artist and cartoonist. She illustrated hundreds of comics, graphic novels, books and magazines, including the autobiographical graphic novel of Marvel Comics editor and writer Stan Lee entitled Amazing Fantastic Incredible Stan Lee, which became a New York Times bestseller. She adapted and did the art for the short story "Troll Bridge" by Neil Gaiman, which also became a New York Times bestseller. Her books have received Eisner, Harvey, Bram Stoker, Locus, and International Horror Guild Awards.

Her 2019 graphic novel adaptation of Neil Gaiman's short story Snow, Glass, Apples, won the Bram Stoker Award for Superior Achievement in a Graphic Novel, the Eisner Award for Best Adaptation from Another Medium, the Ringo Award and received nominations for the Eisner for Best Penciller/Inker and Best Artist Ringo. It was also nominated for the Reuben Award from the National Cartoonists Society for Best Graphic Novel.

Her adaptation of Neil Gaiman's Chivalry received the Eisner Award for Best Adaptation from Another Medium, Locus Award for Best Illustrated and Art Book for 2023, a nomination for the Reuben Award for Best Graphic Novel, the Ringo Award, and it was shortlisted for the Excelsior Award.

She also illustrated the works of Alan Moore, Warren Ellis, Joe R. Lansdale, Anne Rice, J. Michael Straczynski, Peter David and Tori Amos.

== Early work ==
At age five, Doran won an art contest sponsored by the Walt Disney Company. Doran created her comic book series, A Distant Soil, at age twelve.

Doran landed her first work for an advertising agency at age fifteen. She attended Christopher Newport University for one year and the Art Institute of Pittsburgh online for one semester and used her professional works for curriculum credit. Science fiction artist Frank Kelly Freas was her mentor, and she apprenticed with him in the early 1980s

She broke into the comic book industry when still a teenager, scouted by Tom Long for his fanzine Graphic Showcase. Long hired Doran to draw a revival of the 1940s character Miss Fury. Underage Doran quit the assignment due to its adult content. She also contributed illustrations to the Hugo Award nominated fanzine Lan's Lantern.

A Distant Soil was published in fanzines as early as 1979, then scouted by The Donning Company Starblaze imprint before it was contracted by WaRP Graphics. Doran left the company after nine issues due to an acrimonious dispute with WaRP, which attempted to claim copyright and trademark on her work. The WaRP version of the story has never been reprinted despite its unusual all-pencil style, and Doran's ownership of the publishing rights.

== Career ==
Doran discarded the 300 pages of work she did at Warp, and rewrote and redrew the entire A Distant Soil story from scratch, first with Donning, then as a self-publisher. A 1000-page long-form comics narrative, it has been published by Image Comics since 1996. It sold more than 700,000 copies in multiple printings. The production archives were destroyed by the printer, and an extensive restoration process brought the series back to publication in 2013.

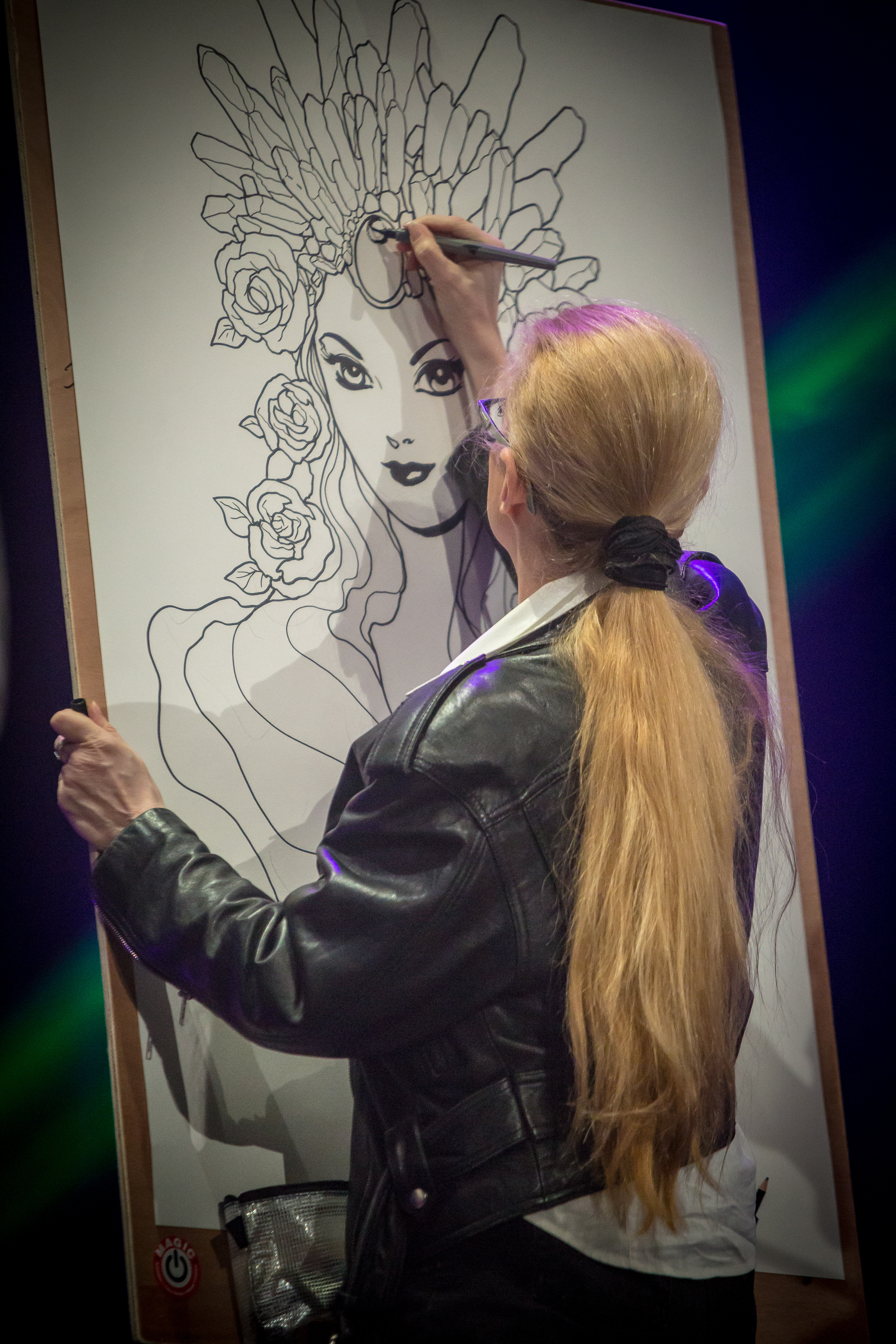
Colleen Doran at the Monaco Anime Game International Conference

Doran was scouted by Keith Giffen to work at DC Comics after he saw her work in the Legion of Superheroes fanzine Interlac. They went on to become frequent collaborators at DC on The Legion of Superheroes projects, Justice League 3001, and the series Reign of the Zodiac. Her art also appeared in Amethyst, Princess of Gemworld No. 12, multiple issues of Who's Who in the DC Universe and Who's Who in the Legion of Superheroes, Superman: Man of Steel Gallery, Christmas with the DC Superheroes, Captain Atom, Star Trek, and Hawkman Annual. She did art for several Teen Titans and Wonder Woman projects.

She illustrated portions of the "Dream Country" and "A Game of You" story arcs in Neil Gaiman's The Sandman series. The character Thessaly in Neil Gaiman's Sandman is based on Doran. Other Vertigo appearances include Shade, The Changing Man, Lucifer (DC Comics), Transmetropolitan and the original graphic novel Orbiter (comics) written by Warren Ellis.

Doran's premiere at Marvel Comics was in 1986, Swords of the Swashbucklers No. 9 and 11, with issue 11 having the dubious distinction of being one of the books confiscated in the 1986 Friendly Franks "obscene" comics raid that precipitated the formation of the Comic Book Legal Defense Fund. Swords of the Swashbucklers was eventually excluded from the prosecution proceedings.

Doran worked on other projects at Marvel including The Guardians of the Galaxy Annual No. 3, The Silver Surfer, Marvel Fanfare, Excalibur No. 28, Captain America: Drug Wars, Amazing Spider-Man, Friendly Neighborhood Spider-Man, a Power Pack mini-series, Handbook of the Marvel Universe, Mutant X, X-Factor, Marvel Girl Comics, and X-Men Millennial Visions for which she wrote and drew an entry. She also worked in the Special Projects Department on promotional, educational, and greeting card art, sometimes working directly with Stan Lee.

At Marvel Comics' Epic division, she worked on Clive Barker's Nightbreed No. 21 and No. 22 as interior and cover artist, and Clive Barker's Hellraiser No. 5 and No. 14, as artist and colorist.

Doran was a web columnist for Wizard Magazine in the early 1990s, and illustrated Super Idol for Warren Ellis in 2001, an early webcomics format experiment at Artbomb.

Doran is featured in the films Ringers (a documentary about The Lord of the Rings fans), Scenes From the Small Press: Colleen Doran by Rich Henn, Sex, Lies and Superheroes, the documentary The Cartoonist about Bone creator Jeff Smith, and Captured Ghosts, a documentary about writer Warren Ellis. She was also featured in the December 12, 2011 episode of "Stalked: Someone's Watching," a Discovery ID television series that profiles stalking incidents, focusing on interviews with victims.

Doran worked as a creator rights activist and as a lobbyist in Washington D.C., and served on the advocacy committee of the Graphic Artists Guild. Lecture venues include the Smithsonian Institution, The Singapore Writers Festival, the Comics Masterclass in Sydney, Australia, and the Maryland Institute College of Art. She spoke at CREATE: Protecting Creativity from the Ground Up at the Newseum in Washington DC, with Congresswoman Marsha Blackburn, Rick Carnes President of the Songwriters Guild of America, musician Suzanne Vega, and other artists and technology policy specialists.

== 2010s ==
Doran illustrated young adult novelist Barry Lyga's first graphic novel for Houghton Mifflin, Mangaman in 2011.

Gone to Amerikay, a graphic novel drawn by Doran and written by Derek McCulloch, was released in 2012 from DC/Vertigo. It is a "multi-generational Irish saga." Gone to Amerikay themed cover art was featured in the St. Patrick's Day edition of the Irish Echo, which was then presented to President Barack Obama by Deputy First Minister Martin McGuinness of Northern Ireland. An excerpt from Gone to Amerikay was chosen for inclusion in The Best American Comics 2013.

Doran produced cover art for The Walking Dead No. 1 (2015, Image Comics), Red Sonja (Dynamite, 2014), Marvel's S.H.I.E.L.D. No. 4 (2015), and Squirrel Girl No. 7 (2016). For DC Comics, she wrote and drew stories for The Vampire Diaries (2014), based on the TV show, and art for Justice League 3001 No. 6, 9 and 10 (2015–2016). For IDW's Womanthology (2012), she contributed biographical essays about classic cartoonists Rose O'Neill and Ethel Hays.

In 2015, she illustrated the autobiography Amazing Fantastic Incredible Stan Lee, co-written by Lee and Peter David.

With Alan Moore, she did the art for Big Nemo, a dystopian sequel to Winsor McCay's Little Nemo in Slumberland, as a webcomic for the Electricomics app.

She wrote script and did the art for an adaptation of Neil Gaiman's short story "Troll Bridge" as a graphic novel for Dark Horse, released in October 2016. She also worked on issues of Faith and X-O Manowar for Valiant Comics. She produced work for the adaptation of Neil Gaiman's American Gods. She was the artist for the series Finality with Warren Ellis at Line Webtoon.

In 2019, Dark Horse Comics published Doran's adaptation of Neil Gaiman's "Snow, Glass, Apples" which was described by The Comics Journal as a work which "...solidifies her place as one of the greatest cartoonists of her generation." The Horror Writers Association presented "Snow, Glass, Apples" with the Bram Stoker Superior Achievement in a Graphic Novel award for 2019. It also won the Eisner Award for Best Adaptation from Another Medium, and the Ringo Award for Best Graphic Novel.

== 2020s ==
In 2020, For "Wonder Woman 750" Doran and Gail Simone teamed up for a story featuring their "breakout" character Star-Blossom, whose first appearance was the Wonder Woman 75th Anniversary Special in 2016. Doran wrote and illustrated a short story for "Sensational Wonder Woman", and illustrated another Wonder Woman short story for "Wonder Woman Black: and Gold" in 2021. She also produced work for DC Comics' "Generations: Forged" and cover art for "Batman: Urban Legends".

In 2021 Doran produced art for the Z2 Comics graphic novel anthology The Doors: Morrison Hotel, an official graphic novel collection based on the music of the band The Doors. Her work was also used for limited edition prints and the bookplate.

Doran wrote and illustrated work for Balmain: Dreams 10 OR a graphic novel dedicated to the French fashion house Balmain in celebration of the 10 year anniversary of creative director Olivier Rousteing.

In 2022, Z2 Comics contracted Doran to produce work for officially licensed graphic novels for Blondie (band), Melissa Etheridge, and the 30th Anniversary of the Tori Amos album Little Earthquakes.

Forbes Magazine announced another Neil Gaiman/Doran collaboration for the adaptation of the Gaiman prose short story "Chivalry" from Dark Horse Comics. Released in March 2022, Doran hand-painted the work in watercolor, ink, and 18K gold after studying illuminated manuscript techniques.

In April 2022, Doran was reported among the more than three dozen comics creators who contributed to Operation USA's benefit anthology book, Comics for Ukraine: Sunflower Seeds, a project spearheaded by editor Scott Dunbier, whose profits would be donated to relief efforts for Ukrainian refugees resulting from the February 2022 Russian invasion of Ukraine.

Neil Gaiman's Chivalry was listed among the Ten Best Graphic Novels of the Year for 2022 by the Washington Post. Doran's work for Chivalry was the subject of a solo exhibit at the Museum of Cartoon Art in San Francisco California.

In 2023, The Society of Illustrators announced a solo exhibit for Doran's work entitled Colleen Doran Illustrates Neil Gaiman featuring work from Chivalry, Snow, Glass, Apples, Troll Bridge, Sandman, American Gods, and Norse Mythology.

Chivalry won the Eisner Award for Best Adaptation From Another Medium, and the Locus Award for Best Illustrated and Art Book for 2023. It was nominated for The Reuben Award for Best Graphic Novel, the Ringo Award, and The Excelsior Award.

In May 2023, it was announced that Doran would adapt the Terry Pratchett/Neil Gaiman novel Good Omens into a graphic novel.

Funded on Kickstarter, to be produced by the Terry Pratchett estate publishing company Dunmanifestin in 2024, the Good Omens graphic novel set a crowdfunding record for a comic book project with a final tally of approximately $3.1 million dollars.

In April 2024, it was announced the Good Omens project would be delayed to allow Colleen Doran time to recover from cancer treatment. The Pratchett Estate announced that the book had been released in August 2025.

In 2026, she was inducted into the Will Eisner Awards Hall of Fame.

== Notable works ==
=== With Neil Gaiman: adaptations and related projects ===
- Good Omens: The Official (and Ineffable) Graphic Novel (2025) Dunmanifestin (graphic novel adaptation and artist) ISBN 9781915799036 ISBN 1915799031
- American Gods: Volume I (2018) anthology (artist) Dark Horse Comics ISBN 1506703860
  - The Complete American Gods (2021) anthology (artist) Dark Horse Comics ISBN 1506720765
  - American Gods No. 4 (2017) (artist) Dark Horse Comics (ASIN:B0717B95ZN)
- Chivalry (2022) Dark Horse Comics (graphic novel adaptation and artist ISBN 1506719112
- The Sandman
  - Sandman Volume III: Dream Country (1991)(2010) DC Comics/Vertigo ISBN 978-1401229351
    - Sandman Volume III: Dream Country 30th Anniversary Edition (2018) DC Comics ASIN B07KZLSD6W
    - Sandman No. 20 DC Comics/ Vertigo (artist)
  - Sandman Volume V: A Game of You (1993) DC Comics/Vertigo ISBN 1563890933
    - Sandman No. 34 DC Comics/ Vertigo (artist)
  - The Absolute Sandman Volume I (2006) DC Comics/Vertigo ISBN 978-1401210823
  - The Absolute Sandman Volume II (2007) DC Comics/Vertigo ISBN 978-1401210830
  - Sandman Omnibus Volume 1 (2013) DC Comics/Vertigo ISBN 978-1401241889
  - Sandman: A Gallery of Dreams (1994) DC Comics/Vertigo (ASIN: B002EAHJN0)
  - The Death Gallery (1996) DC Comics/Vertigo
  - Sandman 20th Anniversary Poster (2008)
  - Death: Deluxe Edition (2012) DC Comics/Vertigo ISBN 978-1401235482
  - Absolute Death (2009) DC Comics/Vertigo ISBN 978-1401224639
- Snow, Glass, Apples (2019) Dark Horse Comics (graphic novel adaptation and artist) ISBN 1506709796
- Troll Bridge (2016) Dark Horse Comics (graphic novel adaptation and artist) ISBN 150670008X
  - Troll Bridge (1998) Image Comics (short story adaptation and artist) (UNSPSC-Code: 55101500)
- Vertigo Visions: Ten Years on the Edge (2003) Watson Guptill ISBN 978-0823056040
- Lucifer No. 62 DC Comics/Vertigo (artist)
  - Lucifer: Volume 10: Morningstar (2006) DC Comics/Vertigo ISBN 978-1401210069

=== Graphic novels: original works, anthologies, and compilations ===
- A Distant Soil graphic novel editions (creator/artist/writer):
  - Late-1980s original color editions:
    - A Distant Soil: Immigrant Song Donning/Starblaze (1987) ISBN 0-89865-514-5
    - A Distant Soil: Knights of the Angel Donning/Whitford Press (1989) ISBN 0-89865-557-9
  - 1990s and on black and white reprints:
    - A Distant Soil: The Gathering Image Comics (1997) compilation of comic issues 1–13 ISBN 1-887279-51-2
    - A Distant Soil: The Ascendant Image Comics (1998) compilation of comic issues 15–25 ISBN 1-58240-018-0
    - A Distant Soil: The Aria Image Comics (2001) compilation of comic issues 26–31 ISBN 1-58240-201-9
    - A Distant Soil: Coda Image Comics (2005) compilation of comic issues 32–38 ISBN 1-58240-478-X hardcover, November 2005, ISBN 1-58240-525-5
  - 2013 and on Digital Remasters and new editions:
    - A Distant Soil: The Gathering TPB Volume I Image Comics/Shadowline (2013) digitally remastered compilation of issues 1–13 with new story content ISBN 978-1607067870
    - A Distant Soil: The Ascendant TPB Volume II Image Comics/Shadowline (2014) digitally remastered compilation of issues 14–25 with new story content ISBN 978-1607068341
- Amazing Fantastic Incredible Stan Lee (2015) Simon and Schuster graphic novel (artist) ISBN 978-1501107726
- Anne Rice's The Master of Rampling Gate: A Graphic Tale of Unspeakable Horror (1991) Innovation graphic novel adaptation (artist) ASIN B00SB53P62
- Balmain Dreams: 10 OR (2021) Z2 Comics original graphic novel anthology (artist)
  - Balmain Dreams: 10 OR (2021) VIP Tier Limited Edition (limited to 50 copies)
  - Balmain Dreams: 10 OR (2021) Special Edition Tier (limited to 3 copies)
- The Book of Lost Souls: Introductions All Around (2006) Marvel Comics graphic novel compilation (artist) ISBN 978-0785119401
  - The Book of Lost Souls (2005) Marvel Comics/Icon issue #1–6
- Disney
  - Walt Disney's Beauty and the Beast: A Tale of Enchantment (1992) Disney Comics
  - Disney Adventures
  - Disney Cartoon Tales: Beauty and the Beast, a Tale of Enchantment (1991) W.D. Publications ISBN 1-56115-267-6
  - Disney's Beauty and the Beast Junior Graphic Novel (1992) ISBN 1-56115-343-5
  - Disney Princess Treasury Volume I (2015) Joe Books ISBN 978-1926516028
  - A Princess Treasury (Step into Reading) (2010) Random House ISBN 978-0736427722
- Gone to Amerikay (2012) DC Comics/Vertigo HC original graphic novel (artist) ISBN 978-1401223519
- Mangaman (2011) Houghton Mifflin original graphic novel (artist) ISBN 978-0547423159
- Morrison Hotel: Graphic Novel (2021) Z2 Comics anthology (artist) ISBN 1940878365
- The Nightmare Factory (2007) Harper Paperbacks graphic novel adaptation anthology (artist) ISBN 0061243531
- Orbiter original graphic novel (artist) (2003) DC Comics/Wildstorm HC ISBN 978-1401200565
  - Orbiter(2004) DC Comics/Vertigo TPB ISBN 978-1401202682
    - Ocean/Orbiter Deluxe Edition (2015) DC Comics/Vertigo HC ISBN 978-1401255343
- Power Pack Classic Omnibus Vol. 2 graphic novel compilation (artist) (2021) Marvel Comics ISBN 1302930362
  - Marvel Fanfare No. 55, (artist) (1990)
  - Power Pack, Miniseries 1–4, (artist) (2000)
- Spider-Man
  - Amazing Spider-Man Epic Collection: Cosmic Adventures (2013) ISBN 978-0785187899
    - Amazing Spider-Man No. 326 (1989)
  - Spider-Man: Died In Your Arms Tonight (2009) ISBN 978-0785144854
    - Amazing Spider-Man No. 600 (2009)
  - Spider-Man: Back In Black hardcover (2007) ISBN 978-0785129202
    - Spider-Man: Back in Black TPB (2008) ISBN 978-0785129967
      - Friendly Neighborhood Spider-Man Annual No. 1 (2007)
  - Spider-Man: Friendly Neighborhood Spider-Man, The Complete Collection (2017) ISBN 1582409641
  - Acts of Vengeance: Spider-Man and the X-Men (2021) ISBN 1302923110
- Tori Amos: Comic Book Tattoo (2008) anthology (artist) Image Comics ISBN 1582409641
- The Vampire Diaries (2014) DC Comics graphic novel compilation, (writer/artist) ISBN 978-1401248994
  - The Vampire Diaries #1,3 (writer) No. 6 (writer/artist) (2013) DC Comics
- Wonder Woman
  - Wonder Woman by George Perez Vol. 4 (2020) DC Comics graphic novel compilation (artist) ISBN 1401291260
    - Wonder Woman No. 45 (1990) DC Comics (artist)
    - Wonder Woman Annual No. 2 DC Comics
  - Wonder Woman by George Perez Vol. 5 (2021) DC Comics graphic novel compilation (artist) ISBN 1779502281
    - Wonder Woman No. 49 (1990) DC Comics (artist)
  - Wonder Woman: The Once and Future Story (1998) DC Comics original graphic novel ISBN 978-1563893735
  - Sensational Wonder Woman (2021) DC Comics graphic novel compilation (writer/artist) ISBN 177951266X
    - Sensational Wonder Woman No. 5 (2021) DC Comics (writer/artist) ASIN B08T6FMK9W
  - Wonder Woman Black and Gold (2022) DC Comics graphic novel compilation (artist) ISBN 1779516584

=== Illustration ===
- Dead in the West by Joe R. Lansdale (2005) Nightshade Books, ISBN 1-597800-14-7
- Generation Wonder: The New Age of Heroes by Barry Lyga et al (2022) Abrams Books ISBN 978-1-4197-5446-3
- Star Wars
  - Art of Star Wars Galaxy, Vol 2. (1994) Berkeley Publishing Group, ISBN 978-1883313036
  - Star Wars Galaxy Magazine No. 4
  - Star Wars Galaxy 4 Trading Cards
  - Star Wars Galactic Files 2 Trading Cards
  - Star Wars Clone Wars Trading Cards
  - Star Wars: Dr Aphra Annual #3, cover artist

== Awards and honors ==
- Eisner Awards Hall of Fame Nominee, 2026, Eisner Awards 2026,
- Eisner Award Winner Best Anthology: Comics for Ukraine: Sunflower Seeds Eisner Awards 2024, (Group Award)
- Eisner Award Best Adaptation from Another Medium Winner, Neil Gaiman's Chivalry, Eisner Awards 2023
- Locus Award, Best Illustrated and Art Book Winner, Neil Gaiman's Chivalry, Locus Awards 2023
- Ringo Award, Best Original Graphic Novel Nomination: Neil Gaiman's Chivalry, Ringo Awards 2023
- 2023 Excelsior Award Shortlist Neil Gaiman's Chivalry, The Stan Lee Excelsior Awards
- 2022 Reuben Award Best Graphic Novel Nominee, Neil Gaiman's Chivalry, National Cartoonists Society
- 2022 Washington Post 10 Best Graphic Novels of the Year: Neil Gaiman's Chivalry
- 2022 Best Graphic Novels for Adults: Neil Gaiman's Chivalry, American Library Association Graphic Novels and Comics Round Table
- Eisner Award Best Adaptation from Another Medium Winner: Neil Gaiman's Snow, Glass, Apples, Eisner Awards 2020
- Bram Stoker Award Superior Achievement in a Graphic Novel Winner: Neil Gaiman's Snow, Glass, Apples, Horror Writers Association 2019
- Ringo Award Best Original Graphic Novel Winner: Neil Gaiman's Snow, Glass, Apples, Ringo Awards 2020
- Eisner Award Best Penciller/Inker Nominee: Neil Gaiman's Snow, Glass, Apples, Eisner Awards 2020
- Ringo Award Best Artist Nominee: Colleen Doran, Ringo Awards 2020
- Reuben Award Best Graphic Novel Nominee: Neil Gaiman's Snow, Glass, Apples, National Cartoonists Society 2020
- Tripwire Award Best Original Graphic Novel Nominee: Neil Gaiman's Snow, Glass, Apples, Tripwire Magazine 2020
- Rondo Award Honorable Mention: Neil Gaiman's Snow, Glass, Apples, Rondo Hattan Classic Horror Awards 2019
- Wizard World Hall of Legends 2017
- Great Graphic Novels for Teens 2017 Nominee Non-Fiction: Amazing Fantastic Incredible Stan Lee, Stan Lee, Peter David, Colleen Doran, Young Adult Library Services Association 2017
- The Best American Comics 2013: Gone to Amerikay excerpt, Derek McCulloch and Colleen Doran, Houghton Mifflin
- Hugo Award Nominee: Chicks Dig Comics, Best Related Work 2013 (Group Nomination)
- Great Graphic Novels for Teens Fiction: Mangaman 2012, Young Adult Library Services Association
- Best Adult Books for Teens: Gone to Amerikay, Derek McCulloch and Colleen Doran, School Library Journal 2012
- Eisner Award Winner: Tori Amos Comic Book Tattoo (anthology) 2009, Best Anthology (Group Award)
- Harvey Award Winner: Tori Amos Comic Book Tattoo (anthology) 2009, Best Anthology (Group Award)
- International Horror Guild Award: The Nightmare Factory (anthology) 2008, Best Illustrated Narrative (Group Award)
- Eisner Award Winner: Best Archival Collection/Project Comic Books, Absolute Sandman, Vol 1 (Group Award)
- Women Cartoonist's Hall of Fame, 2007, Friends of Lulu
- Artist in Residence, Smithsonian Institution May 6–14, 2006 "Capricious Comics", Freer/Sackler Galleries, The Smithsonian Museums of Asian Art
- Comics Buyer's Guide Fan Award Top Ten Nominee: Favorite Penciler, Favorite Inker, Favorite Cover Artist, Favorite Comic Book A Distant Soil 2004
- Chesley Award Nominee, Monochrome Work Unpublished 2002
- American Library Association 2002 featured speaker
- Gaylactic Spectrum Award Nominee, A Distant Soil, Best Other Work 2001
- Guest of Honor, San Diego Comic-Con 1998
- 3rd Annual Japan-US Manga Symposium, Tokyo 1996, Tezuka Productions
- Eisner Award Nominee: Sandman, Best Serialized story 1993 (Group Nomination)
- Eisner Award Winner: Sandman, Best Continuing Series 1993 (Group Award)
- Eisner Award Winner: Sandman, Best Continuing Series 1992 (Group Award)
- Eisner Award Nominee: Sandman: Dream Country, Best Graphic Album Reprint 1992 (Group Nomination)
- Dori Seda Award Nominee: Most Promising New Female Cartoonist 1988

== Exhibits ==
- POW! The Art of Comics, Muskegon Museum of Art, Muskegon, MI,
- Colleen Doran Illustrates Neil Gaiman, 2023-2024, San Diego Comic Con Museum, San Diego, CA,
- Colleen Doran Illustrates Neil Gaiman, 2023, The Society of Illustrators, New York City, NY
- Chivalry: The Art of Colleen Doran, 2022, Cartoon Art Museum, San Francisco, CA
- The Legend of Wonder Woman, 2021, Cartoon Art Museum, San Francisco, CA
- Women in Comics, 2021, Palazzo Merulana, Rome, Italy
- Women in Comics: Looking Forward, Looking Back, 2020, Society of Illustrators, New York, NY
- A Boy and His Tiger: A Tribute to Bill Watterson, 2020, Cartoon Art Museum, San Francisco, CA
- Four Color Images Gallery, New York, NY
- Kunstlerhaus, Stuttgart, Germany
- Porto, Portugal
- Secession Gallery, Vienna, Austria
- Gijon Cultural Center, Gijon, Spain
- San Francisco Cartoon Art Museum, San Francisco, CA
- Museum of Cartoon Art, Rye Brook, New York
- Gallery Nucleus: 20 Years of Sandman 2008
- Gallery Nucleus: A Handful of Dust, 25 Years of Sandman
- Krannert Art Museum; Out of Sequence: Underrepresented Voices in American Comics
- Laboratory of Art and Ideas at Belmar; Out of Sequence
