= Lee Garbett =

British comic book artist

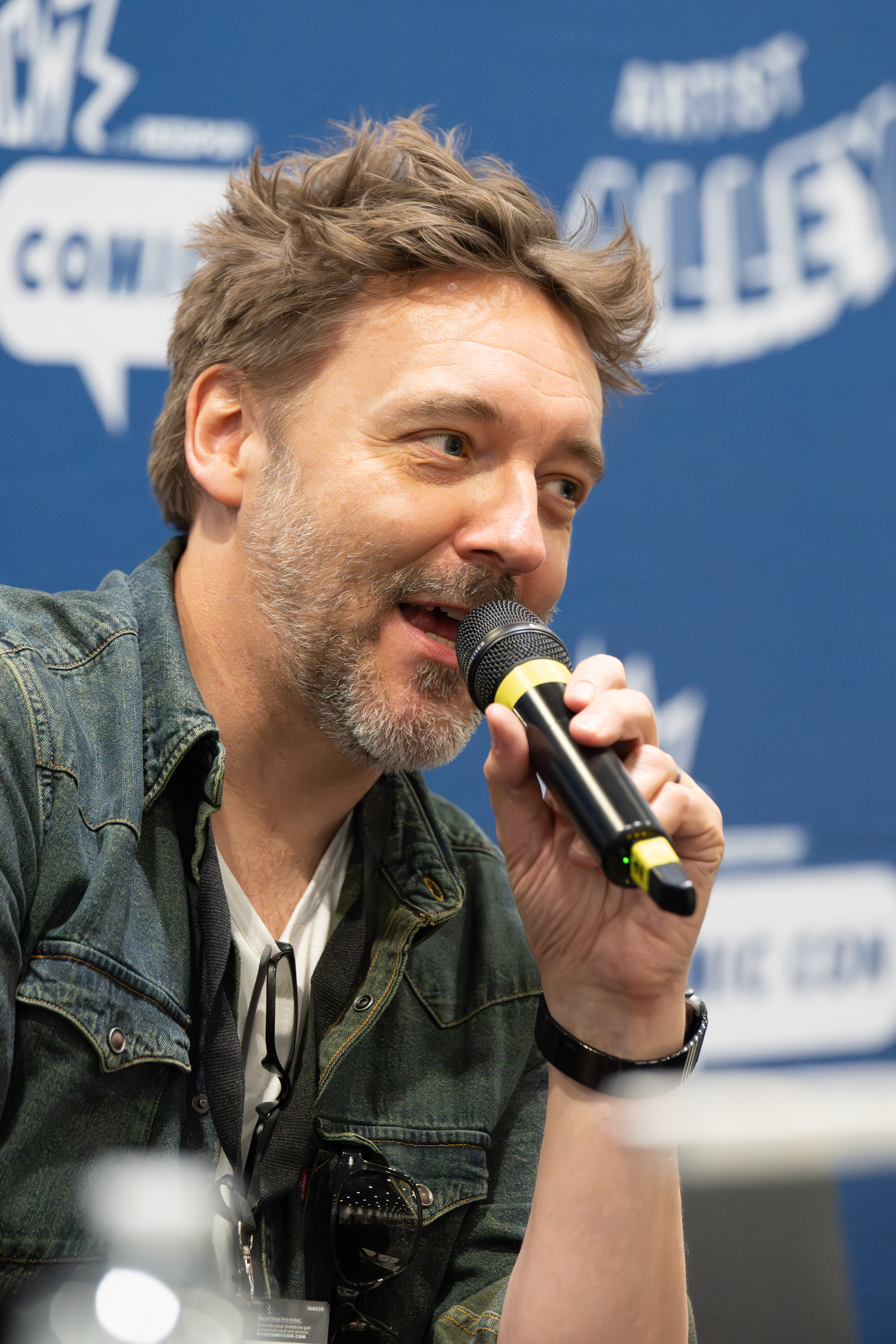
- At MCM London Comic Con, 22 May 2026
- Areas: Penciller, Inker
- Notable works: Batgirl; Batman; Loki: Agent of Asgard; Lucifer; Skyward; Daredevil

Lee Garbett is a British comic-book artist known for his work for DC Comics, Marvel Comics, Image Comics and BOOM! Studios. His credits include Batgirl, Batman, Loki: Agent of Asgard, Lucifer and the creator-owned Image Comics series Skyward. In 2026, he became the artist of Marvel Comics’ Daredevil series, written by Stephanie Phillips.

== Career ==
He created the 4-issue mini-series Dark Mists with Annika Eade, which follows a group of Geisha blackmailed into becoming assassins. After AP Comics folded the title was picked up and reprinted by Markosia.

Lee left the series after issue No. 3 and moved to 2000 AD, most notably on the series London Falling, co-created with Simon Spurrier. He also worked on a Judge Dredd strip for the Judge Dredd Megazine.

He then moved to US publisher, DC Comics and their Wildstorm imprint. There he first worked on The Highwaymen before working with Keith Giffen on Midnighter and the DC/Wildstorm Universe crossover Dreamwar. He is also providing the art for the two-part Batman story which follows the Batman R.I.P. storyline and links into Final Crisis.

Lee drew the first arc on DC comics The Outsiders, entitled "The Deep," as well as the new Batgirl title, relaunched in August 2009 following Battle for the Cowl. He provided pencils for the sixth and final issue of Grant Morrison'sThe Return of Bruce Wayne limited series.

Draw Comic Book Action, an instructional book detailing Garbett's methods for drawing comic book action scenes, was published in 2010.

In 2011, he drew a three-part crossover for Marvel titled "Identity Wars", which took place across the Spider-Man, Hulk and Deadpool annuals.

== Bibliography ==
- Dark Mists (with Annika Eade, Markosia, 2005–2006, tpb, June 2007, 100 pages, ISBN 1-905692-17-X)
- Tharg's Future Shocks: "Doom-Dream of Destiny!" (with Al Ewing, in 2000 AD #1481, 2006)
- London Falling (with Simon Spurrier, in 2000 AD #1491–1495, 2006)
- The Highwaymen (with Marc Bernardin and Adam Freeman, 5-issue mini-series, Wildstorm, August–December 2006, tpb, 112 pages, March 2008, ISBN 1-4012-1733-8)
- Judge Dredd: "Shadowkill" (with Robbie Morrison, in Judge Dredd Megazine #254–255, 2007)
- Midnighter #16–20 (pencils, with writer Keith Giffen and inks by Rick Burchett, ongoing series, Wildstorm, April–August 2008, collected in Midnighter: Book 3: Assassin8, 168 pages, December 2008, ISBN 1-4012-2001-0)
- Dreamwar (pencils, with writer Keith Giffen and inks by Trevor Scott, 6-issue limited series, DC/Wildstorm, June–November 2008, tpb, 144 pages, April 2009, ISBN 1-4012-2203-X)
- Batman #682–683 (pencils, with writer Grant Morrison and inks by Trevor Scot, DC Comics, November–December 2008, collected in Batman R.I.P., hardcover, 192 pages, January 2009, ISBN 1-4012-2090-8)
- "Christmas With the Beetles" (pencils, with writer J. C. Vaughn and inks by Trevor Scot, in DCU Holiday Special, DC Comics, February 2009)
- The Outsiders #15–18, 20 (pencils, with writer Peter Tomasi and inks by Trevor Scott, ongoing series, DC Comics, April–September 2009)
- Batgirl #1–7, 9–12, 14 (pencils, with writer Bryan Q. Miller and inks by Trevor Scott, ongoing series, DC Comics, October 2009 – April 2010, June–November 2010)
- Batman: The Return of Bruce Wayne No. 6 (with Grant Morrison, 6-issue limited series, DC Comics, 2010, forthcoming)
- Draw Comic Book Action (Impact books, November 2010, 128 pages, ISBN 978-1-4403-0813-0)
- "Can't Get the Service" (with pencils by Rob Williams, in The Amazing Spider-Man No. 658, Marvel Comics, June 2011)
- "Identity Wars" (with John Layman, Marvel Comics):
- The Amazing Spider-Man Annual No. 38
- Loki: Agent of Asgard (with Al Ewing), 2014
- "Lucifer" written by Holly Black and Richard Kadrey
- "Skyward" written by Joe Henderson Image Comics Nominated for Eisner Award 2018 winner Skyward has been picked up by Sony for Film adaptation.
- Boom Comics: Main cover and variant comic covers; Titles "Bone Parish" "Firefly" Dark Crystal"
- Bottleneck Gallery : Movie Poster
- X-Men: Days of Future Past; Costume Design
