= Donning =

Donning may refer to:

- John Donning (c.1530-?), English MP and mayor
- The Donning Company, US printing company
