= DC/Wildstorm: DreamWar =

DC/Wildstorm comic book series

- Cover to DreamWar #1 by Mike McKone (pencils), Andy Lanning (inks) and Randy Mayor (colors)

Publication information
- Publisher: DC Comics; Wildstorm
- Schedule: Monthly
- Format: Limited series
- Genre: Superhero; Crossover
- Publication date: June – November 2008
- No. of issues: 6
- Main character(s): DC Universe; Wildstorm Universe

Creative team
- Written by: Keith Giffen
- Penciller: Lee Garbett
- Inker: Trevor Scott
- Letterer: Rob Leigh
- Colorist: Randy Mayor
- Editor(s): Scott Peterson; Kristy Quinn

Collected editions
- DC/Wildstorm: DreamWar: ISBN 978-1-4012-2203-1

DC/Wildstorm: DreamWar is a six-issue comic book limited series written by Keith Giffen, drawn by Lee Garbett and published by DC Comics in 2008. The series is a crossover between the DC and Wildstorm Universes.

== Synopsis ==
The story of DreamWar revolves around the character Dreamslayer, who is a powerful being from the WildStorm Universe who gains control over Dreamtime, a dimension connecting all dreams. Dreamslayer manipulates the dreams of various superheroes and supervillains, turning them against each other and creating chaos and conflict.

As a result, characters from both universes find themselves trapped in a shared dream world where they are forced to fight each other. The heroes and villains are manipulated by the Dreamslayer, who takes pleasure in watching their battles and reveling in the chaos that he has created.

== Collected editions ==
The series was collected into a trade paperback (ISBN 978-1401222031).
