= London Falling =

British comic strip

London Falling is a strip published in June-July 2006 in the British comics magazine 2000 AD, created by writer Simon Spurrier and artist Lee Garbett. It explores bogeymen and monsters, mostly from English folklore, wreaking havoc in a modern setting.

The title is a play on the Clash's 1979 album London Calling.

== Characters ==
The characters draw heavily on folklore, mostly from England. They include:

- Jack Capelthwaite is a family man who is a shapeshifting monster, a bogeyman.
- Black Shuck is the leader of the gang; his name comes from the East Anglian version of the black dog.
- The Hedley Kow is a form of elf or hobgoblin, shown in the story as a shapeshifting monster.
- Jenny Greenteeth
- Peter Struwwel, a character from a 19th-century German children's book by Heinrich Hoffman
- The Tailor, a bogeyman from "The Story of Little Suck-a-Thumb", also from Hoffmann's book
- Tommy Rawhead is an Irish hobgoblin with a taste for children.
- Black Annis
- Cailleach Bheur
- Dando the Huntsman, a Cornish priest connected with ideas of the Wild Hunt
- Bucco-Boo is a kind of bogeyman (the name presumably coming via 'bugaboo').
- Mujina is a Japanese bogeyman that can take on the form seen in the series, a faceless ghost
- The Horndon Worm was a dragon from East Horndon who was killed by James Tyrrell (who also appears in the series) using mirror-polished armour.

== Appearances ==
Each episode of London Falling is given an individual title:

- Part 1: City Folk (in 2000AD #1491)
- Part 2: Loredogs (in 2000AD #1492)
- Part 3: Let Me Take You By The Hand (in 2000AD #1493)
- Part 4: That Go Bump (in 2000AD #1494)
- Part 5: Smoke and Mirrors (in 2000AD #1495)

The five episodes were reprinted in Judge Dredd Megazine 386.

== See also ==
- English folklore
