= Heckler (character) =

The Heckler
- The Heckler as depicted in The Heckler #1 (September 1992). Art by Keith Giffen and Malcolm Jones III.

Publication information
- Publisher: DC Comics
- First appearance: The Heckler #1
- Created by: Keith Giffen

In-story information
- Alter ego: Stuart "Stu" Mosely
- Team affiliations: Justice League

The Heckler is a parody superhero appearing in media published by DC Comics. He first appeared in The Heckler #1 (cover-dated September 1992), the first of an ongoing series that ended with The Heckler #6 (cover-dated February 1993).

== Publication history ==
Keith Giffen created the Heckler as "a superhero Bugs Bunny" because he wanted to work with Bugs, but felt that DC Comics (who were publishing Bugs' comics at the time) would not have approved of his handling of the character. Tom and Mary Bierbaum, who previously worked with Giffen on Legion of Super-Heroes, scripted the series over his plots and pencils for its run.

Though the Heckler's costume is covered with "Ha ha"s, Giffen told the Bierbaums that the Heckler must never laugh in this manner, since the laugh was a signature aspect of the Creeper.

Though The Heckler #7 appeared in solicitations, it was not finished beyond the plot and cover art. After learning that sales on the series were "plummeting", Giffen approached DC and asked them to cancel The Heckler and leave #6 as the final issue.

== Fictional character biography ==
Stuart "Stu" Mosely, co-owner of "EATS", a skid row diner in the ghetto section of Delta City, fights the injustices and slightly goofy criminal element as The Heckler, armed only with his sarcastic wit and a brightly colored costume. Stu's motivations and origins are unknown. He receives no respect from his contemporaries in either his civilian or costumed alter ego's existence.

While walking around as Stu, he comes across as slightly anal, frustrated and awkward. When wearing his costume, however, he seems to become a completely different person, endlessly confident and insanely daring with a talent for trickery and a smart-mouthed sense of humor that he uses to irritate, annoy and insult his foes until they usually pretty much defeat themselves in a style highly reminiscent of cartoon character Bugs Bunny (who Keith Giffen admits was a major influence on the creation of the Heckler). He lacks super powers and is not a very skilled fighter. Nonetheless, he is usually able to get out of a situations in a cartoonish manner.

== Supporting cast ==
Ledge – Stu's "man in the chair" and one of the few who knows his secret identity. He provides most of Stu's information regarding his opponents, keeping extensive dossiers on major crime figures in Delta City. Even if they are riddled with spelling errors.

François – Stu's slightly anal-retentive, obsessive, but highly creative cook at "Eats".

Mr. Dude – One of the patrons of "EATS". A leather jacket-clad overweight and middle-aged greaser who provides Stu with information on underworld activities and is regularly visited by the denizens of Delta City, including generals and monsignors, for advice on a vast variety of subjects.

Gus McDougal – The officer of the Delta City Police Department and ex-husband of the Minx. McDougal bemoans the changing face of Delta City and mourns the fact that despite there being advertised as having "42 Varieties", the donut shop lacks more than just glazed donuts.

Mayor Clump – Delta City's mayor has a grey, undefined face. He wears either a "liberal" or "conservative" human face mask, depending on his audience.

The Minx – A beautiful gun-toting loner in dark glasses and a mohawk who has a teenage daughter named Axi. She hunts criminals in Delta City for the reward money, but there is a distinct personal motivation involved as they all tend to be men she previously dated. Minx is a parody of characters like the Punisher, and guns down criminals without consideration for due process.

X-Ms. – One of the Heckler's superheroic peers in Delta City. She defends the Christmas-themed section of Delta City called "Tinseltown".

Rabbi Zone and Dreidel – The Rabbi is part of the Brotherhood of the Zone Magi, an ancient order-enforcing group. He possesses unspecified powers derived from the Zone Patch, a purple circle in his right palm. Dreidel is Zone's adolescent sidekick, and can spin and travel at high speeds. The two are Jewish and parodies of Batman and Robin.

Lex Concord – The superhero of Delta City during the 1800s. Concord fled into the future after the demonic Flying Buttress destroyed Delta.

== Enemies ==
Boss Glitter – The dainty and theatrical mob boss of Delta City. He has a penchant for elaborate masks, frilly clothes, and the ruthless removal of those who fail him.

P.C. Rabid – A masked, conservative media celebrity. He constantly attempts to demonize the Heckler.

Bushwack'r – A bounty hunter whose weapons continuously backfire on him. A direct parody of Wile E. Coyote.

El Gusano – An assassin who resembles a humanoid worm.

John Doe, The Generic Man – A complete blank slate. He can rob his environment (including all inanimate objects and persons in the surrounding vicinity) of any of its individual characteristics. Doe is accompanied by Buckshot, a woman who possesses explosive freckles.

Rachet Jaw and Kriegler – Trigger men for Boss Glitter. Jaw is a common-looking mobster with a mechanical lower jaw that unhinges to reveal a gun barrel. The gun can be fed through an ammo belt attached to his chin. Kriegler is Jaw's verbose, diminutive sidekick.

The Cosmic Clown – An alien android assassin who resembles a clown. He was a birthday gift for an alien prince that went rogue and attacked Delta City.

C'est Hay – A psychopathic killer who resembles a scarecrow and has delusions of being an actor.

The Four Mopeds of the Apocalypse – The sidekicks of the Four Horsemen of the Apocalypse, who are charged with summoning the Flying Buttress, a fleshy eldritch entity. They include Skippy, Famine Lass, Plague Boy, and Kid Pestilence.

Cuttin' Edge – This character never actually appeared in any comic. A crusader for edgy and cynical art who despises mass-appeal media, he was to be the villain of the uncompleted seventh issue.

== Comic connections ==
The Keith Giffen-created DC Comics character Vext was also a resident of Delta City. Delta City also appeared in Giffen's Doom Patrol series, where it is damaged by alternate reality versions of the team.

The Heckler makes a minor appearance in JLA: Welcome to the Working Week alongside Plastic Man and Ambush Bug.

In issue 12 of Book of Fate, Heckler makes a cameo in a bar called Warriors where he and some other lesser known heroes are talking about their crime fighting memories.

The Heckler appears in the miniseries One-Star Squadron (Dec 2021-July 2022), with a new costume that leaves his lower face exposed.

The Heckler would later appear in issue 7 of Blue Beetle's 2023 series as part of a tribute to Keith Giffen along with other cameos from Giffen's portfolio of characters.

In 2024's "How to Lose a Guy Gardner in 10 Days", Heckler can be seen presenting chocolates to Wonder Woman in the short story "Say Yes to the Mess".

In 2024's "The Question: All Along the Watchtower" issue 4, The Heckler can be found in the background during an invasion by Cyborg Superman. Heckler can also be found in the background of issue 6.

== In other media ==
The Heckler appears as a character summon in the video game Scribblenauts Unmasked: A DC Comics Adventure.
