= Hero Squared =

Hero Squared is an American comic book series published by Boom! Studios. Originally a limited series, it is written by Keith Giffen and J. M. DeMatteis and illustrated by Joe Abraham. The series follows the superhero Captain Valor as he adjusts to a new life in an alternate universe alongside Milo, a normal version of himself, and Milo's girlfriend Stephie, an alternate incarnation of Valor's arch-enemy Caliginous.

== Publication history ==
In 2004, the Hero Squared X-Tra Sized Special one-shot was published by Atomeka Press, leading to a 2005 three-issue limited series by Boom! Studios. As a result, in 2006 Hero Squared became an ongoing series which lasted for six issues. A trade paperback, collecting the one shot and miniseries was published as well. In January 2009, another three-issue mini-series began, titled Hero Squared: Love and Death. These three issues are meant to wrap up the story left unfinished in the 2006 series.

In between the series, a two-issue limited series called Planetary Brigade featuring Captain Valor's superhero team was published. Another limited series, this one with three issues, called Planetary Brigade: Origins, was also published.
