= Reign of the Zodiac =

Comic book series

Reign of the Zodiac is a comic-book series created in 2003 by Keith Giffen (writer), Colleen Doran (penciller) and Bob Wiacek (inker), and published by DC Comics.
