= The Colors of Space =

1963 novel by Marion Zimmer Bradley

- First edition cover art of Ralph Brillhart published by Monarch Books
- Author: Marion Zimmer Bradley
- Language: English
- Publication date: 1963

The Colors of Space is a 1963 science fiction novel by Marion Zimmer Bradley.

The book has been reviewed by P. Schuyler Miller for the Analog Science Fiction and Fact (1964), by Steve Miller for the Science Fiction Review (1983), and also that year by Robert Coulson for the Amazing Science Fiction.

The story was adapted into a 1983 graphic novel illustrated by Lee Moyer and published by Starblaze Graphics.

== Plot summary ==
Humans have spread to other planets within our galaxy, partly helped by a race of apparently friendly aliens known as the Lhari. The Lhari originate in another galaxy but are physically and physiologically similar to humans. They run a faster-than-light (FTL) transport network in human-occupied space, using a technology based on a rare substance from their own galaxy. FTL travel is understood to be fatal for humans unless they are in suspended animation, which is used routinely for human travellers. This and the supply of fuel gives the Lhari a monopoly on interstellar transport.

Although humans and Lhari trade peacefully and profitably, some humans resent the Lhari and believe they are deliberately limiting the human race. The protagonist, Bart Steele, is recruited by an illegal organisation to act as a spy on board a Lhari ship. He is given a cryptic message about the "eighth color" and remembers his mother, who had worked with the Lhari, commenting that the FTL fuel had a color that did not fit into the normal spectrum.

Steele learns that humans can survive FTL travel without suspended animation. He is given cosmetic surgery and training and joins a Lhari crew. He is instructed to sabotage the ship's radiation detector so that the crew can be killed with radiation at one of its scheduled stops, allowing human agents to seize the ship and learn the location of its planet of origin.

Steele initially complies with the plan, but is unwilling to sacrifice the Lhari crew and confesses to the captain. The circumstances of the confession put Steele in danger, which helps to convince the captain that he genuinely does not wish to harm them. The captain explains to him that the Lhari had never had a war and were terrified by humanity's bloody history, so they decided to protect themselves by limiting humans' travel.

Steele is held on the ship while it completes its voyage home, and taken before the Lhari authorities. They determine that he has no memories that could threaten their security, and accept the captain's testimony that he is harmless. They decide it is no longer viable to preserve the myth about human vulnerability to FTL travel and allow him to return home, where he will stand trial by human authorities for violating the treaty between the two races.

On the way, Steele ponders the significance of the "eighth color". The distinctive color of the fuel was not common knowledge because it was outside the normal visible spectrum, and the Lhari had no color vision. The population of the planet where Steele's mother was born had evolved a little-known additional color sense that allowed them to see the fuel's color under very bright light. Steele remembers seeing that same color while visiting an uninhabited planet called Koromi on his initial voyage, and realises that he now knows the location of a source of fuel within our own galaxy.

Steele publicises his findings, making it clear that the human race will soon be able to reach the stars without help. The Lhari authorities, seeing their monopoly ending, take an optimistic view that the new developments will ultimately be good for both races, and Steele is invited to re-join the Lhari crew in preparation for training future human crews.

== Reviews ==
- Envoyer (German) (Issue 27 - Jan 1999)
