= Orbiter (comics) =

2003 graphic novel

- Cover to Orbiter, art by Colleen Doran.
- Date: April 2003
- Page count: 104 pages
- Publisher: Vertigo

Creative team
- Writers: Warren Ellis
- Artists: Colleen Doran
- Letterers: Clem Robins
- Colourists: Dave Stewart
- Editors: Art Young
- ISBN: 1-4012-0056-7

Orbiter is a graphic novel by Warren Ellis and Colleen Doran, published in 2003 by DC Comics under their Vertigo imprint.

Ellis and Doran, both spaceflight enthusiasts, dedicated Orbiter to the "lives, memories and legacies" of the astronauts who died in the 2003 Columbia disaster.

== Synopsis ==
Ten years after the Space Shuttle Venture mysteriously disappeared, it returns. Of its original crew of seven, only one remains — and he is catatonic; also, there is sand from Mars in the shuttle's landing gear and the vessel itself appears to now have skin. Three specialists are brought in to investigate the Venture and its occupant, to find out what happened.

== Reception ==
Publishers Weekly compared Orbiter's narrative structure to Ellis's earlier work Planetary, and commended Ellis for giving the story "emotional depth". Claude Lalumiere praised Orbiter for its "sincerity, its passionate engagement, and the bold inventiveness of its ideas", but overall considered that the plot moved too smoothly, with insufficient conflict; he also criticized Doran's portrayal of emotion. IGN's Hilary Goldstein concluded that the book "isn't for everyone", but emphasized its appeal to "dreamers and space cadets".

== Publication history ==
The graphic novel was first published as a hardcover by Vertigo in April 2003 (ISBN 1-4012-0056-7) and as a softcover by Little Brown in May 2004 (ISBN 1-4012-0268-3). Titan Books published a British softcover in June 2004 (ISBN 1840237244).
