= Joe Abraham =

American comic book artist

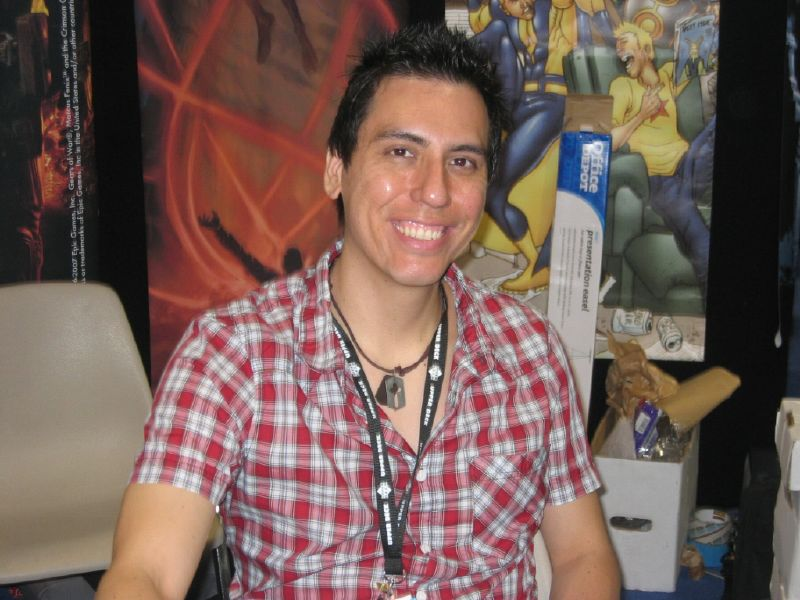
Joe Abraham in 2007.

Joseph Conrad Abraham, is an American-born comic book illustrator and actor. He is best known for his work as the artist on the comic, Hero Squared published by Boom! Studios. He has also worked on comics in the Warhammer 40,000 and Cthulhu universes. His work has been acclaimed by comic book writer Keith Giffen, who compared his art on Hero Squared to the work of Kevin Maguire and Adam Hughes.
