= Walsworth Publishing Company =

- Type: Private company
- Industry: Printing
- Founded: 1937; 89 years ago in Marceline, Missouri
- Founders: Don Walsworth
- Headquarters: 306 N. Kansas Avenue, Marceline, Missouri, USA
- Key people: Don O. Walsworth, CEO
- Products: Yearbooks Books Magazines Catalogs
- Revenue: US$85.1 million (est.)
- Number of employees: 1,250
- Website: walsworth.com

Walsworth Publishing Company is a family-owned printing company based out of Marceline, Missouri. The company was started in 1937 by Don Walsworth. The current CEO of the company is Don's son, Don O. Walsworth, and the current president is his grandson, Don Walsworth. Walsworth operates from administrative offices and book printing and binding facilities in Marceline, Missouri; a prepress facility in Brookfield, Missouri; a sales and marketing office in Overland Park, Kansas; and magazine and catalog printing facilities in Saint Joseph, Michigan; Ripon, Wisconsin; and Fulton, Missouri. Additionally, Walsworth owns the Donning Company Publishers, a specialty book publisher.

== Company history ==
Walsworth Publishing Company is among the 30 largest printing companies in the United States. It is headquartered in Marceline, Missouri.

In 1937, Don Walsworth settled in Marceline to print playbills with a borrowed typewriter and a mimeograph machine. Soon the product line expanded to include cookbooks and, following World War II, memorial books to honor those who had served.

In 1947, Walworth began to produce yearbooks. In 1970, the commercial printing division was established to balance the cyclical yearbook production schedule, adding textbooks, catalogs, magazines and other specialty publications to the Walsworth line.

== Business model ==
Walsworth produces books, catalogs and magazines, and is the only family-owned publisher of yearbooks.

Walsworth is still a family-owned company that employs more than 1,250 people worldwide. Over 675 employees have attained Master Printer of America status.

The company operates from administrative offices and book printing and binding facilities in Marceline, Missouri; a prepress facility in Brookfield, Missouri; a sales and marketing office in Overland Park, Kansas; and magazine and catalog printing facilities in Saint Joseph, Michigan; Ripon, Wisconsin; and Fulton, Missouri. Additionally, Walsworth owns the Donning Company Publishers, a specialty book publisher.

In December 2019, the company announced plans to acquire the Wisconsin-based Ripon Printers.
