= Defex =

Comic book series

Publication information
- Publisher: Aftermath (an imprint of Devil's Due Productions)
- Format: Comic book
- Publication date: October 2004
- No. of issues: 6
- Main character(s): Ariel Davis (Six), Jack Morgan (Idol), Mia Sanchez (Rush), Haley Rin (Chimera), Tristan Warfield

Creative team
- Created by: Marv Wolfman (writer), Stefano Caselli (pencils), Sunder Raj (colors)

Defex is a comic book series printed by Aftermath (itself an imprint of Devil's Due Productions). It was first published in October 2004. Its creators are Marv Wolfman (writer), Stefano Caselli (pencils), and Sunder Raj (colors). Six issues of Defex have been printed.

== Plot ==
The story is set around a group of students taking a college course in which they are asked to list ways in which society could benefit from the application of nanotubes. They are assigned together apparently at random, and they decide their topic: using nanotubes to alter human DNA, giving them access to abilities which are latent in the human genome. When they present their thesis, the university refuses to let them test it. During the night they test the nanotubes upon themselves and awake with superhuman abilities.

It has been implied that the experiment that gave them their powers has some connection to Jeff Carey, aka Breakdown, who stars in another of Aftermath's titles.

== Characters ==
- Ariel Davis (alias Six) - A young woman who has all of her senses heightened to a super human level, with an extra sixth sense
- Jack Morgan (alias Idol) - A young man with the ability to control pheromones and hormones at will
- Mia Sanchez (alias Rush) - Young woman who is able to control her adrenaline
- Haley Rin (alias Chimera) - Young man who has animal-like transformations, limited to vertebrates
- Tristan Warfield - A teen who wields a mysterious power

== See also ==
- List of Devil's Due Publishing publications
