= Aftermath (comics) =

American comic book imprint

Aftermath was a super hero comic book imprint published by Devil's Due Publishing. A brainchild of Josh Blaylock, the new imprint aimed to establish a new, accessible, continuity-free universe that could later be expanded into a series of multi-media franchises. The imprint drew inspirations from comic book superheroes, as well pulp fiction, various cult genres and modern-day pop culture.

Aftermath premiered in 2004 with four comic book titles (in order of debut): Defex, Breakdown, the Blade of Kumori, and Infantry. Each title was based on a concept conceived by Josh Blaylock, who provided the basic outline and the loose framework which connected those titles. Each creative team was given considerably leeway to develop those concepts as they saw fit. For the initial arc, the idea of the shared universe was deemphasized in favor of giving each title its own identity.

By spring 2005, it became clear that sales were not large enough to support the line. Josh Blaylock canceled all titles with the intention of relaunching Aftermath Universe as a single title that would involve characters from all prior titles and introduce new characters (in essence, an imprint-wide crossover). However, after looking at sales figures, Devil Due's staff came to the conclusion that any attempt to revive the line would not be financially viable. As of this writing, there has been no effort to revive the Aftermath Universe.

Due to the abruptness of the initial cancellation, only Defex and Breakdown were able to finish their initial story arc. Blade of Kumori and Infantry were cancelled after five and four issues, respectively.
