= Drafted (comics) =

Publication information
- Publisher: Devil's Due Publishing
- Schedule: Monthly
- Format: Limited series
- Genre: , military science fiction
- Publication date: September 2007 – October 2008

Creative team
- Written by: Mark Powers
- Artist(s): Chris Lie

Collected editions
- Volume 1: ISBN 1-934692-04-2
- Volume 2: ISBN 1-934692-33-6

Drafted is a comic book series by Mark Powers and Chris Lie, published by Devil's Due Publishing starting in 2007.

== Publication history ==
A 99-cent preview was published in June 2007 and the main series began in September 2007. Twelve issues were published up to October 2008.

== Plot ==
It is the story of the human race in the early 21st century, and their encounter with alien beings who need their help in an intergalactic war. Without much choice, the humans of Earth are drafted into the conflict.

In the one-shot publication Drafted: One Hundred Days, scheduled to be shipped in June 2009, the story picks up after the first wave of alien attacks has been repelled. As Chicago suffers through the worst winter in a century, former U.S. Senator Barack Obama is conscripted into a construction unit tasked to rebuild the city.

== Reception ==
Although still early in its publication, Drafted has already received praise from several critics, including Blair Butler of G4's Fresh Ink.

== Collected editions ==
The first six issues and the 99-cent preview issue were released in a trade paperback on May 21, 2008, in the US (ISBN 1-934692-04-2), and in the UK on March 1, 2008. The UK volume 1 includes the 99-cent preview issue, but only collects issues 1 – 5.

- Volume 1 (144 pages, March 2008, ISBN 1-934692-04-2)
- Volume 2 (144 pages, December 2008, ISBN 1-934692-33-6)

== Film ==
The comic was slated to be a film from New Line Cinema, with a possibility of being released in 2010. In 2014, Chris Bender and J. C. Spink announced that they would produce the film.

== See also ==
- List of Devil's Due Publishing publications
