= I Was a Teenage Grave Robber =

Short story by Stephen King

- Short story by Stephen King
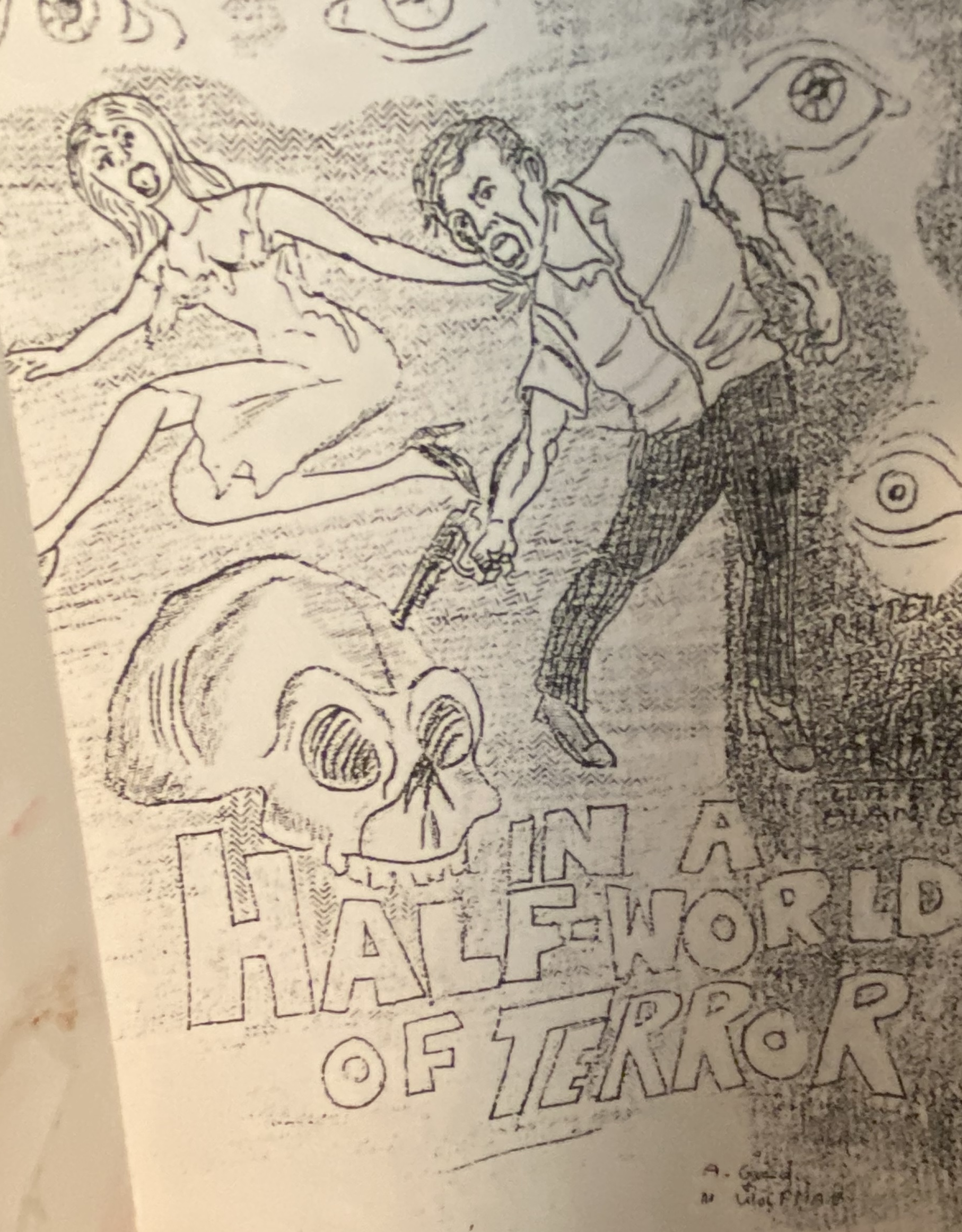
- Artwork from "In a Half-World of Terror" from issue #2 of the fanzine Stories of Suspense
- Country: United States
- Language: English
- Genre: Horror/science fiction short story

Publication
- Published in: Comics Review
- Publisher: Mike Garrett
- Media type: Print
- Publication date: 1965

Chronology
Codename: Mousetrap	The 43rd Dream

"I Was a Teenage Grave Robber" is a short story by Stephen King. It was first published in the fanzine Comics Review in 1965; a rewritten version was published in 1966 under the title "In a Half-World of Terror". It was King's first independently published story.

== Plot summary ==
The story takes place in the (fictitious) district of Belwood, California, in 1962. The narrator, Danny Gerald (amended in the rewrite to "Gerad"), was orphaned at the age of 13; by age 18, he is conned out of the last of his inheritance, forcing him to drop out of college. While drowning his sorrows in a bar, Danny meets Rankin, who recruits him to work for his employer, the cadaverous Steffen Weinbaum. Visiting Weinbaum's Victorian mansion, Danny learns that the job entails procuring corpses for Weinbaum to use in his experiments. Desperate for money so he can resume his education, Danny reluctantly agrees.

Two days later, Danny and Rankin visit the Crestwood Cemetery at night, where they dig up the body of the recently deceased Daniel Wheatherby and take it to Weinbaum's laboratory. While driving home, Danny witnesses a man dragging a young woman into a panel truck; his intervention leads to the truck crashing, killing the man. The girl, Vicki Pickford, explains that the man was her uncle David, her legal guardian, who she was running away from due to his drunkenness. While on a date with Vicki, Danny receives a call from Rankin urgently summoning him to Weinbaum's mansion. Danny brings Vicki with him to the mansion, where she reveals that David began drinking heavily while working there, with Danny realising that he was recruited to replace David.

Leaving Vicki in his car, Danny finds the laboratory ransacked, with broken glass tank, green liquid on the floor, and a blood trail leading into the garage. Following the trail into a tunnel, Danny finds Rankin dead from a head wound. At the end of the tunnel, Danny finds Weinbaum standing above a pit containing an unseen "mewing" creature. Hearing Vicki scream, Danny returns to the laboratory, where he finds two more tanks have broken. Taking Weinbaum's revolver, Danny follows a trail left by Vicki and a large pursuer into the woods.

Finding Vicki in a gully, Danny determines that three creatures have escaped from the tanks, with the first having been trapped in the pit by Weinbaum and the second now trapped in the gully, leaving one unaccounted for. Returning once more to the mansion, Danny finds Weinbaum being attacked by an enormous maggot made up of millions of smaller maggots. As the giant maggot kills Weinbaum, Danny kills the maggot by setting the green liquid on fire, then flees with Vicki.

In the epilogue, Danny reveals that the ensuing fire destroyed fifteen square miles of the surrounding land. Returning to the mansion after the fire, Danny discovers Weinbaum's diary, which reveals that after he exposed corpses to gamma rays, the maggots in the corpses grew and eventually formed three giant gestalt creatures. While feeling guilt over the death of Rankin, Danny resolves to move forward with Vicki.

== Publication ==
King wrote "I Was a Teenage Grave Robber" while in high school at the age of 17. The story was partially inspired by King's part-time job as a gravedigger. The story's title derives from contemporary films such as I Was a Teenage Frankenstein and I Was a Teenage Werewolf. "I Was a Teenage Grave Robber" was the first of King's works to be accepted for publication, albeit he was not paid for it. The story was first published in 1965 as a four-part serial in issues #1 to #4 of the fanzine Comics Review edited by Mike Garrett; the fourth issue was never published. In 1966, a rewrite of the story was printed in issue #2 of the MW Publications fanzine Stories of Suspense where it was given the new title "In a Half-World of Terror" by editor Marv Wolfman. The story was partially reprinted in the 2009 work The Stephen King Illustrated Companion. The original version of the story as published in Comics Review is held in the Murray Collection of Duke University Libraries.

== Reception ==
Rocky Wood describes "I Was a Teenage Grave Robber" as "juvenilia" and "derivative of 1950s B-grade science fiction/horror movies" and as having "both structural and internal logic problems". Tyson Blue describes the story as being influenced by "EC's gallows humour and rotting revengers", while David M. Kingsley describes it as "a Timely/Atlas pastiche". Tyson Blue further notes "...one of the story's biggest problems is the very thing which many people see as a real selling point to King's current work - the element of humor". Stephen J. Spignesi states that "I Was a Teenage Grave Robber" "has some style and structure problems" but represents "an important step forward for the teenaged King", noting "just how developed King's storytelling abilities were by the age of eighteen and how committed he was to telling those stories".

== See also ==
- Stephen King short fiction bibliography
- Unpublished and uncollected works by Stephen King
