= List of Devil's Due Publishing publications =

Devil's Due Productions is an American comic book company. This is a list of their publications.

== 0–9 ==
- 7 Days of Death #1 (2015)

== A ==
- Aftermath: The Blade of Kumori #1–5 (November 2004–April 2005)
- Aftermath: Breakdown #1–6 (October 2004–April 2005)
- Aftermath: Defex #1–6 (October 2004–April 2005)
- Aftermath: Infantry #1–6 (December 2004–April 2005)
- Alexandria Ocasio-Cortez and the Freshman Force (May 2019)
- Arkworld #1–3 (June 2020–June 2022)
- Army of Darkness: Ashes 2 Ashes #1–4 (July 2004–January 2005; co-published with Dynamite Entertainment)
- Army of Darkness: Shop Till You Drop Dead #1–4 (January–July 2005; co-published with Dynamite Entertainment)

== B ==
- Barack the Barbarian #1–4
- The Best of the Golden Age Sheena, Queen of the Jungle

== C ==
- Cannon Busters #0–1
- Chucky #1–5 (by Brian Pulido and Josh Medors)
- The Corps! #0 (by Rick Remender and Roberto Carlos)
- Cosmic Guard #0–6

== D ==
- Dawn of the Dread Force #0–4 (by Kurt Hathaway and Gerardo Sandoval, December 2008–April 2009)
- DemonWars: Demon Awakens #1–3
- DemonWars: The Demon Spirit #1–3
- Drafted #1–12 (by Mark Powers and Chris Lie)
- Drafted: One Hundred Days #1 (by Mark Powers, 2009)
- Dragonlance: The Legend of Huma #1–6
- Dragonlance: Legends Time of the Twins #1–3
- Dragonlance Chronicles, Vol. 1: Dragons of Autumn Twilight #1–8
- Dragonlance Chronicles, Vol. 2: Dragons of Winter Night #1–4
- Dragonlance Chronicles, Vol. 3: Dragons of Spring Dawning #1–12

== E ==
- Eberron: Eye of the Wolf
- Echoes of the Damned #1 (by James Pascoe and Roger Robinson)
- Evil Ernie in Sante Fe

== F ==
- Family Guy: Big Book o' Crap (collects Family Guy #1–3, April 2006, ISBN 1-932796-65-7)
- Family Guy, Vol. 1: 100 Ways to Kill Lois
- Family Guy, Vol. 2: Peter Griffin's Guide to Parenting
- Family Guy, Vol. 3: Books Don't Taste Very Good
- Forgotten Realms I: Homeland #0–3
- Forgotten Realms II: Exile #1–3
- Forgotten Realms III: Sojourn #1–3
- Forgotten Realms IV: The Crystal Shard #1–3
- Forgotten Realms V: Streams of Silver #1–3
- Forgotten Realms VI: The Halfling's Gem #1–3
- Forgotten Realms VII: Legacy #1–3
- Forgotten Realms VIII: Starless Night #1

== G ==
- Galaxys for Hire #1–4 (November 2016–April 2017; co–published with 1First Comics)
- G.I. Joe: A Real American Hero #1–43
- G.I. Joe: America's Elite #0–36
- G.I. Joe: Battle Files #1–3
- G.I. Joe: Cobra Reborn #1
- G.I. Joe: Dreadnoks Declassified #1–3
- G.I. Joe: The Data Desk Handbook A–M
- G.I. Joe: The Data Desk Handbook N–Z
- G.I. Joe: Frontline #1–18
- G.I. Joe: Reborn #1
- G.I. Joe: Master and Apprentice #1–4
- G.I. Joe: Master and Apprentice II #1–4
- G.I. Joe: MIA #1–2
- G.I. Joe: Reloaded #1–14
- G.I. Joe: Scarlett Declassified #1
- G.I. Joe: Sigma 6 #1–6
- G.I. Joe: Snake Eyes Declassified #1–6 (August 2005–January 2006)
- G.I. Joe: Storm Shadow #1–7
- G.I. Joe Declassified #1–3
- G.I. Joe Special Missions: Antarctica
- G.I. Joe Special Missions: Brazil
- G.I. Joe Special Missions: The Enemy
- G.I. Joe Special Missions: Manhattan
- G.I. Joe Special Missions: Tokyo
- G.I. Joe vs. The Transformers II #1–4 (September–December 2004)
- G.I. Joe vs. The Transformers: Black Horizon #1–2 (January–February 2007)
- G.I. Joe vs. The Transformers: The Art of War #1–4 (March–July 2006)

== H ==
- Hack/Slash (April 2004)
- Hack/Slash: The Series #1–32 (May 2007—March 2010)
- Hack/Slash: Comic Book Carnage (March 2005)
- Hack/Slash: Entry Wound (May 2009)
- Hack/Slash: Girls Gone Dead (October 2004)
- Hack/Slash: Land of Lost Toys #1—3 (November 2005—January 2006)
- Hack/Slash: Slice Hard (December 2006)
- Hack/Slash: Trailers (March 2006)
- Hack/Slash/Evil Ernie (June 2005)
- Hack/Slash/Mercy Sparx: A Slice of Hell (October 2010, co-published with Arcana Studio)
- Hack/Slash vs. Chucky (March 2007, written by Tim Seeley and drawn by Matt Merhoff)
- Halloween: 30 Years of Terror (August 2008)
- Halloween: Nightdance #1—4 (February—May 2008)
- Halloween: The First Death of Laurie Strode #1—2 (September—November 2008)
- The Haunted Caves (October 2008)
- Hollow-Eyed Mary (April 2009)
- How to Be a Comic Book Artist...Not Just How to Draw (January 2007)
- How to Self–Publish Comics...Not Just Create Them #1—4 (February—June 2006)

== I ==
- I Am Legion: The Dancing Faun #1–6 (released under Humanoids Publishing)

== J ==
- Josh Howard's Black Harvest #1–6

== K ==
- Killer7 #0–4
- Kore: Lost in Abaddon
- Kore and Warstone: The World of Abaddon

== L ==
- Lost Squad #1–6
- Lovebunny & Mr. Hell
- Lovebunny & Mr. Hell: A Day in the Love Life
- Lovebunny & Mr. Hell: One Shot
- Lovebunny & Mr. Hell: Savage Love

== M ==
- Mercy Sparx (2013 – )
- Micronauts #1–3 (2004)
- Micronauts: Karza #1–4
- Misplaced@17 #1
- Misplaced: Somewhere Under the Rainbow #1–4

== N ==
- Nightwolf #0–5 (by Stephen L. Antczak and Nick Marinkovich)
- Ninjatown: The Adventures of Wee Ninja #1
- The Nye Incidents #1 (by Whitley Strieber and Craig Spector)

== P ==
- Proliferating ComiCulture: The Art, Rants, and Commentary of a Comic Book Upstart (June 2008, ISBN 1-934692-25-5)

== S ==
- Sheena, Queen of the Jungle #0–5
- Sheena: Trail of the Mapinguari #1
- Spartacus: Blood and Sand #1–3
- Spooks #1–4
- Spooks: Omega Team #0

== T ==
- Tales of Mr. Rhee: Karmageddon #1–4 (2014)
- This Off Beat Town (August 2019)
- The Toxic Avenger and Other Tromatic Tales (October 2007)
- Trailer Park Boys Get a F#C*!ng Comic Book (July 2021)
- Trailer Park Boys in the Gutters (September 2022)
- Trailer Park Boys: Bagged & Boarded (September 2021)
- Trailer Park Boys: House of 1000 Conkys (June 2022)

== V ==
- Voltron: Defender of the Universe #1–11 (January–December 2004)
- Voltron: A Legend Forged #1–5 (July 2008–April 2009)

== W ==
- Warstone: Abaddon Invades #1 (April 2004)
- White #1–4 (2016–2017)
- The Witchfinder General #1–5 (2015–2016; co-published with 1First Comics)
- The Wood Boy (April 2005)
- The Worlds of Dungeons and Dragons #1–7 (February–November 2008)

== X ==
- Xombie: Reanimated #1–6 (April–August 2007; by James Farr and Nate Lovett)

== Y ==
- Yumiko: Curse of the Merch Girl (September 2015)

== Z ==
- Zen: Intergalactic Ninja (October 2008)
- Zen: Intergalactic Ninja: Hard Bounty #1–6 (2015–2016; co-published with 1First Comics)
- Zen: Intergalactic Ninja: Home (2017; co-published with 1First Comics)
- Zen: Intergalactic Ninja: The Zenith Orb (July 2016)
- Zen: Intergalactic Ninja 2008 San Diego Convention Exclusive (2008)
- Zen: Intergalactic Ninja 3D Convention Special #1 (2011; co-published with 1First Comics)
- Zen: Intergalactic Ninja Sampler (2009)
- The Zombies That Ate the World #1–8 (February–October 2009; by Guy Davis)
