= Marv Wolfman =

American comic book writer (born 1946)

- Wolfman at GalaxyCon San Jose in 2026
- Born: Marvin Arthur Wolfman; May 13, 1946 (age 80) New York City, U.S.
- Areas: Writer, Editor
- Notable works: The Tomb of Dracula; Blade; The Amazing Spider-Man; Daredevil; Nova; The New Teen Titans; Crisis on Infinite Earths; Adventures of Superman; Nightwing
- Awards: Shazam Award (1973); Inkpot Award (1979); Eagle Award (1982, 1984); Jack Kirby Award (1985, 1986); Scribe Award (2007); National Jewish Book Award (2008)
- Spouses: Michele Wolfman (divorced); Noel Watkins
- Children: 1

Marvin Arthur Wolfman (born May 13, 1946) is an American comic book and novelization writer. He worked on Marvel Comics's The Tomb of Dracula (1972–1979), for which he and artist Gene Colan created the vampire-slayer Blade, and DC Comics's The New Teen Titans and the Crisis on Infinite Earths limited series with George Pérez.

Among the many characters Wolfman created or co-created are Cyborg, Raven, Starfire, Deathstroke, Tim Drake, Rose Wilson, Nova, Black Cat, Phobia, Bullseye, Vigilante (Adrian Chase), Night Force, the Omega Men, and the Nightwing identity of Dick Grayson.

== Early life ==
Marv Wolfman was born in Brooklyn, New York City, the son of police officer Abe and housewife Fay. He has a sister, Harriet, 12 years older. When Wolfman was 13, his family moved to Flushing, Queens, in New York City, where he attended junior high school. "I grew Superman was a part of my childhood," Wolfman said in a 1987 DC Comics editorial. "I grew up watching the television series and then discovered comics. Superman was then—and now—my favorite character."

He went on to New York's High School of Art and Design, in Manhattan, hoping to become a cartoonist. Wolfman is Jewish.

== Career ==
=== 1960s ===
Marvin Wolfman was active in fandom before he began his professional comics career at DC Comics in 1968. Wolfman was one of the first to publish Stephen King, with "In A Half-World of Terror" in Wolfman's horror fanzine Stories of Suspense No. 2 (1965). This was a revised version of King's first published story, "I Was a Teenage Grave Robber", which had been serialized over four issues (three published and one unpublished) of the fanzine Comics Review that same year.

Wolfman was childhood friends with Len Wein, who would later go on to work in DC and Marvel with Wolfman, and the two would assist with each other's fanzines. Wolfman continued to meet and befriend other future comics industry coworkers, such as Mark Hanerfeld at "Academy Con" in 1965 and Wolfman, Wein, and Hanerfeld, all met others such as Gerry Conway and Steve Mitchell during DC Comics' Thursday office tours in 1967.

Wolfman's first published work for DC Comics appeared in Blackhawk No. 242 (Aug.–Sept. 1968). He and Len Wein created the character Jonny Double in Showcase No. 78 (November 1968) plotted by Wolfman and scripted by Joe Gill. The two co-wrote "Eye of the Beholder" in Teen Titans No. 18 (Dec. 1968), which would be Wein's first professional comics credit. Neal Adams was called upon to rewrite and redraw a Teen Titans story which had been written by Wein and Wolfman. The story, titled "Titans Fit the Battle of Jericho!", would have introduced DC's first African American superhero, but was rejected by publisher Carmine Infantino. The revised story appeared in Teen Titans No. 20 (March–April 1969). Wolfman and Gil Kane created an origin for Wonder Girl in Teen Titans No. 22 (July–Aug. 1969) which introduced the character's new costume.

=== 1970s ===
He and artist Bernie Wrightson co-created Destiny in Weird Mystery Tales No. 1 (July–Aug. 1972), a character which would later be used in the work of Neil Gaiman.

In 1972, Wolfman moved to Marvel Comics as a protégé of then-editor Roy Thomas. When Thomas stepped down, Wolfman eventually took over as editor, initially in charge of the publisher's black-and-white magazines, then finally the color line of comics. Wolfman said in 1981 that, "Marvel never gave [its] full commitment to" the black-and-white line. "No one wanted to commit themselves to the staff." He added, "We used to farm the books out to Harry Chester Studios [sic] and whatever they pasted up, they pasted up. I formed the first production staff, hired the first layout people, paste-up people." Wolfman stepped down as editor-in-chief to spend more time writing.

He and artist Gene Colan crafted The Tomb of Dracula, a horror comic that became "one of the most critically-acclaimed horror-themed comic books ever". During their run on this series, they created Blade, a character who would later be portrayed by actor Wesley Snipes in a film trilogy. In addition, the editorship of Marvel could not resist the opportunity to assign a writer with such a surname to contribute a few stories to their concurrent monster title, Werewolf by Night, with a playful editor's comment: "At last -- WEREWOLF -- written by a WOLFMAN."

Wolfman co-created Bullseye in Daredevil No. 131 (March 1976). He and artist John Buscema created Nova in that character's eponymous first issue. Wolfman and Gil Kane adapted Edgar Rice Burroughs' Barsoom concepts into comics in Marvel's John Carter, Warlord of Mars series. Wolfman wrote 14 issues of Marvel Two-in-One starting with issue No. 25 (March 1977). The Spider-Woman series was launched in April 1978 by Wolfman and artist Carmine Infantino. As the first regular writer on Spider-Woman, he redesigned the character, giving her a human identity as Jessica Drew. Wolfman succeeded Len Wein as writer of The Amazing Spider-Man and in his first issue, No. 182 (July 1978), had Peter Parker propose marriage to Mary Jane Watson who refused, in the following issue. Wolfman and Keith Pollard introduced the Black Cat (Felicia Hardy) in The Amazing Spider-Man No. 194 (July 1979).

In 1978, Wolfman and artist Alan Kupperberg took over the Howard the Duck syndicated newspaper comic strip. While writing the Fantastic Four (which Wolfman stated to be his favorite comic), Wolfman and John Byrne introduced a new herald for Galactus named Terrax in No. 211 (Oct. 1979). A Godzilla story by Wolfman and Steve Ditko was changed into a Dragon Lord story published in Marvel Spotlight vol. 2 No. 5 (March 1980). The creature that the Dragon Lord battled was intended to be Godzilla, but since Marvel no longer had the rights to the character, the creature was modified to a dragon called The Wani.

=== 1980s ===
==== The New Teen Titans ====
In 1980, Wolfman returned to DC after a dispute with Marvel. Teaming with penciller George Pérez, Wolfman relaunched DC's Teen Titans in a special preview in DC Comics Presents No. 26 (October 1980). The New Teen Titans added the Wolfman-Pérez creations Raven, Starfire, and Cyborg to the old team's Robin, Wonder Girl, Kid Flash, and Beast Boy (renamed Changeling). The series became DC's first new hit in years; Christopher J. Priest called Deathstroke, another new character, "the first modern supervillain". Wolfman wrote a series of New Teen Titans drug awareness comic books which were published in cooperation with The President's Drug Awareness Campaign in 1983–1984. The first was pencilled by Pérez and sponsored by the Keebler Company, the second was illustrated by Ross Andru and underwritten by the American Soft Drink Industry, and the third was drawn by Adrian Gonzales and financed by IBM. In August 1984, Wolfman and Pérez launched a second The New Teen Titans series.

Other projects by Wolfman for DC during the early 1980s included collaborating with artist Gil Kane on a run on the Superman feature in Action Comics; a revival of Dial H for Hero with Carmine Infantino; launching Night Force, a supernatural series drawn by Gene Colan; and a nearly two-year run on Green Lantern with Joe Staton. During their collaboration on that series, Wolfman and Staton created the Omega Men in Green Lantern No. 141 (June 1981). Wolfman briefly wrote Batman and co-created the Electrocutioner in issue No. 331 (Jan. 1981). Wolfman was one of the contributors to the DC Challenge limited series in 1986.

After Pérez left The New Teen Titans in 1985, Wolfman continued for many years with other collaborators – including pencillers José Luis García-López, Eduardo Barreto and Tom Grummett. In December 1986, Wolfman was informed by Marvel writer Chris Claremont that a DC executive had approached Claremont at a holiday party and offered him the position of writer on The New Teen Titans. Claremont immediately declined the offer and told Wolfman that apparently the publisher was looking to replace him on the title. When Wolfman confronted DC executives about this, he was told it was "just a joke", although Claremont reiterated that he took it to be a credible and official offer.

==== Crisis on Infinite Earths ====
In 1985, Wolfman and Pérez launched Crisis on Infinite Earths, a 12-issue limited series celebrating DC's 50th anniversary. Featuring a cast of thousands and a timeline that ranged from the beginning of the universe to the end of time, it killed scores of characters, integrated a number of heroes from other companies to DC continuity, and re-wrote 50 years of DC universe history to streamline it. After finishing Crisis, Wolfman and Pérez produced the History of the DC Universe limited series to summarize the company's new history.

Wolfman was involved in the relaunch of the Superman line as well, reinventing nemesis Lex Luthor and initially scripting the Adventures of Superman title with Jerry Ordway as the artist. During this period they introduced Bibbo Bibbowski and Professor Emil Hamilton.

==== Ratings dispute ====
Wolfman got into a public dispute with DC over a proposed ratings system, which led to his being relieved of his editorial duties by the company. DC offered to reinstate Wolfman as an editor provided he apologize for making his criticism of the ratings system public, rather than keeping them internal to the company, but he declined to do so.

=== 1990s ===
Wolfman returned to the Dark Knight for another brief run on Batman and Detective Comics, writing "Batman: Year Three", creating the third Robin, Tim Drake, as well as Abattoir and a new version of the Electrocutioner, and writing an anniversary adaptation of the first ever Batman story, which was printed along with two other adaptations and the original. He continued as The New Titans writer and revitalized the series with artist Tom Grummett. Wolfman wrote the series until the title's last issue. Wolfman's writing for comics decreased as he turned to animation and television, though he wrote the mid-1990s DC series The Man Called A-X.

==== Disney career ====
In the early-1990s, Wolfman worked at Disney Comics. He wrote scripts for a seven-part DuckTales story ("Scrooge's Quest"), as well as several others – with the characters from the Mickey Mouse universe – that appeared in Mickey Mouse Adventures. He was editor of the comics section on the Disney Adventures magazine for the early years of the publication.

==== Marvel lawsuit ====
In 1997, on the eve of the impending release of the Blade motion picture, Wolfman sued Marvel Characters Inc. over ownership of all characters he had created for Marvel Comics. A ruling in Marvel's favor was handed down on November 6, 2000. Wolfman's stance was that he had not signed work-for-hire contracts when he created characters including Blade and Nova. In a nonjury trial, the judge ruled that Marvel's later use of the characters was sufficiently different to protect it from Wolfman's claim of copyright ownership.

==== Beast Machines ====
In the late 1990s, Wolfman developed the Transformers TV series Beast Machines, which aired on Fox Kids for two seasons from 1999 to 2000. The program was a direct continuation of the Beast Wars series, which itself was a continuation of the original Generation One Transformers series. Beast Machines was met with mixed reviews, as the show was praised for its story, but was criticized for its focus on spirituality. Previously, in the 1980s, Wolfman wrote the story for Optimus Prime's return in "The Return of Optimus Prime" of the third season of Transformers.

=== 2000s ===
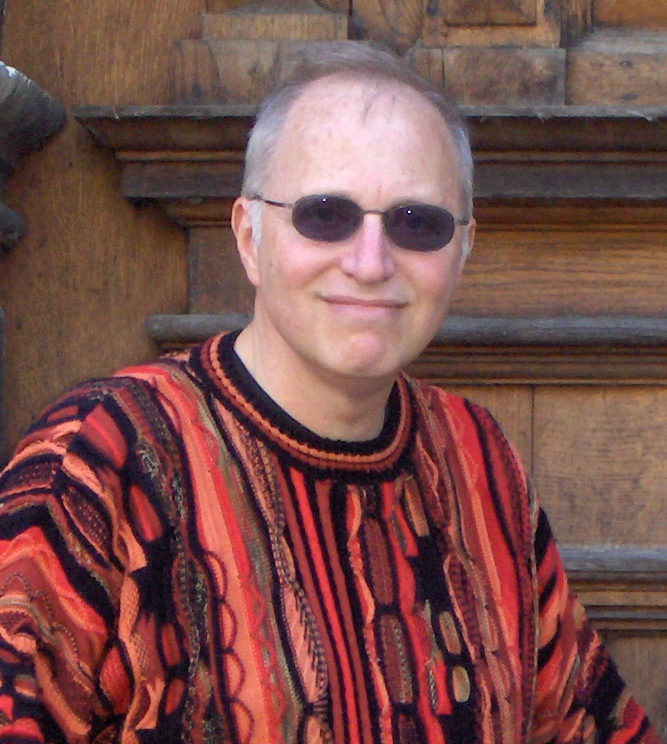
Wolfman in 2007

A decade later, Wolfman began writing in comics again, scripting Defex, the flagship title of Devil's Due Productions' Aftermath line. He wrote an "Infinite Crisis" issue of DC's "Secret Files", and consulted with writer Geoff Johns on several issues of The Teen Titans. Wolfman wrote a novel based on Crisis on Infinite Earths, but rather than following the original plot, he created a new story starring the Barry Allen Flash that takes place during the original Crisis story. Wolfman wrote the novelization of the film Superman Returns, and worked on a direct-to-video animated film, The Condor, for Stan Lee's Pow Entertainment.

In 2006, Wolfman was editorial director of Impact Comics (no relation to the DC Comics imprint), publisher of educational manga-style comics for high school students. That same year, starting with issue No. 125, Wolfman began writing DC's Nightwing series. Initially scheduled for a four-issue run, Wolfman's run was expanded to 13 issues, and finished with No. 137. During the course of his run, Wolfman introduced a new Vigilante character. Following Wolfman's departure from the pages of Nightwing, the Vigilante was spun off into his own short-lived title, which Wolfman wrote. He wrote a miniseries starring the Teen Titan Raven, a character he and George Pérez co-created during their run on The New Teen Titans, helping to revamp and update the character. He worked with Pérez on a direct-to-DVD movie adaptation of the popular storyline "The Judas Contract" from their tenure on Teen Titans.

=== 2010s ===
In 2011, he and Pérez completed the New Teen Titans: Games graphic novel, which they had begun working on in the late 1980s. Wolfman revived his Night Force series with artist Tom Mandrake in 2012. He served as writing consultant on the video game Epic Mickey 2: The Power of Two, which he was nominated for a Writers Guild of America Award for Outstanding Achievement in Videogame Writing. In 2015, Wolfman wrote a novelization of the video game Batman: Arkham Knight. And in 2016 he published the novelization of the Suicide Squad film through Titan Books. He received the Hero Initiative Lifetime Achievement Award in 2017. That year also marked Wolfman's first work for Marvel since 1998: a backup story for Bullseye #1, starring the titular character that he had co-created in 1976. In 2019, he wrote the main story for the DC Primal Age 100-Page Giant. Also in 2019, DC published the oversized, 100-page comic book Man and Superman, Marv Wolfman's retelling of Superman's origin story, to high acclaim.

=== 2020s ===
On the occasion of the Crisis on Infinite Earths Arrowverse crossover, Marv Wolfman co-wrote an episode of The CW series Arrow with Marc Guggenheim that aired in January 2020. He also made a cameo appearance in the crossover finale in an episode of Legends of Tomorrow. In 2021, Wolfman and George Pérez voiced caricatures of themselves in two episodes of Teen Titans Go!.

In 2023, Wolfman returned to Marvel Comics for the oneshot What If...? Dark: Tomb of Dracula featuring his character Blade. In April 2024, Wolfman wrote the final two pages of the landmark 300th issue of Nightwing.

== Writing credit pioneer ==
Wolfman, on the panel "Marvel Comics: The Method and the Madness" at the 1974 New York City Comic Art Convention, told the audience that when he first began working for DC Comics, he received DC's first writing credit on its mystery magazines. Gerry Conway, who wrote the horror-host interstitial pages between stories, wrote in one issue, House of Secrets Vol. 1 Issue 83, that the following story, "The Stuff that Dreams are Made of" was told to him by a "wandering Wolfman." The Comics Code Authority, which did not permit the mention of werewolves or wolfmen at that time, demanded it be removed. DC informed the Authority that "Wolfman" was the writer's last name, so the Authority insisted he be given a credit to show the "Wolfman" was a real person. Once Wolfman was given a credit, other writers demanded them as well. Shortly, credits were given to all writers and artists.

== Personal life ==
Wolfman is married to Noel Watkins. Wolfman was previously married to Michele Wolfman, for many years a colorist in the comics industry. They have a daughter, Jessica Morgan.

== Awards ==
- Inkpot Award in 1979.
- 1982 Eagle Award for "Best New Book" and 1984 and 1985 Eagle Awards for "Best Group Book" for New Teen Titans.
- Wolfman and artist George Pérez' Crisis on Infinite Earths won the 1985 and 1986 Jack Kirby Awards for Best Finite Series.
- In 1985, DC Comics named Wolfman as one of the honorees in the company's 50th anniversary publication Fifty Who Made DC Great.
- 1986 Nominated for the Comics Buyer's Guide Award for Favorite Writer in 1986, and his work on the "Batman: Year Three" story arc in Batman #436–439 was nominated Comics Buyer's Guide Favorite Writer Award in 1990.
- 2007 Scribe Award for "Adapted Speculative Fiction Novel", given by writers of novelization and tie-in fiction for his novel based on Superman Returns.
- 2007 National Jewish Book Award for "Children's and Young Adult Literature", for Homeland: The Illustrated History of the State of Israel
- 2011 induction into the Will Eisner Hall of Fame
- Hero Initiative Lifetime Achievement Award in 2017
- Recipient of the Faust Award (Lifetime Achievement) from the International Association of Media Tie-In Writers.

== Filmography ==
=== Screenwriting credits ===
(series head writer denoted in bold)

- G.I. Joe: A Real American Hero (1986)
  - Lasers in the Night
  - Nightmare Assault
- Jem (1986–1987)
  - Broadway Magic
  - The Bands Break Up
- Captain Power and the Soldiers of the Future (1987)
  - A Fire in the Dark
- Fraggle Rock: The Animated Series (1987)
  - The Radish Fairy / The Funniest Joke in the Universe
- Starcom: The U.S. Space Force (1987)
  - Turnabout
- The Transformers (1987) (season 3 head writer)
- Garbage Pail Kids (1988)
- RoboCop (1988)
  - The Hot Seat
- Superman (1988)
  - Destroy the Defendroids
  - The Adoption
  - Superman and Wonder Woman vs. The Sorceress of Time
  - Wildsharkk
- G.I. Joe: A Real American Hero (1991)
  - Messenger from the Deep
- Batman: The Animated Series (1992)
  - Feat of Clay: Part 1
  - Feat of Clay: Part 2
    - Clayface (2026 live-action film; based on Feat of Clay)
- My Little Pony Tales (1992)
  - The Masquerade
- Cadillacs and Dinosaurs (1993)
  - Wild Child
- Conan the Adventurer (1993)
  - Isle of the Naiads
- Monster Force (1994)
- Spider-Man: The Animated Series (1995)
  - The Menace of Mysterio
- Tenko and the Guardians of the Magic (1995)
  - Through the City Darkly
- Beast Wars: Transformers (1996)
  - The Probe
- G.I. Joe Extreme (1996)
  - Operation: Underground
- Street Fighter (1996)
  - So, You Want to be in Pictures
- ReBoot (1997–1999)
  - To Mend and Defend
  - Mousetrap
  - System Crash
- Pocket Dragon Adventures (1998)
- Godzilla: The Series (1998)
  - Hive
- Shadow Raiders (1998–1999)
  - Born in Fire
  - Blood is Thicker...
  - Against all Odds
  - This is the Way the World Ends...
  - Nor Iron Bars a Cage
  - The Long Road Home
- Beast Machines: Transformers (1999)
  - Fires of the Past
  - Revelations, Part II: Descent
  - Prometheus Unbound
- Sherlock Holmes in the 22nd Century (1999)
  - The Adventure of the Empty House
- The Legend of Tarzan (2001)
  - Tarzan and the Rough Rider
- Teen Titans (2003, 2005)
  - Deep Six
  - Titans East
  - Lightspeed
- Speed Racer: The Next Generation (2008)
  - Be Cruel to Your School
- Sym-Bionic Titan (2010)
  - Escape to Sherman High
- Arrow (2020)
  - Crisis on Infinite Earths: Part Four

=== Video games ===
- Superman Returns (2006)
- Green Lantern: Rise of the Manhunters (2011)

=== Acting credits ===
Year	Title	Role	Notes
2020	Legends of Tomorrow	Autograph Seeker Marv	Episode: "Crisis on Infinite Earths: Part Five" (S5 special episode)
2021	Teen Titans Go!	Himself	Episode: "Marv Wolfman and George Pérez"

== Bibliography ==
=== Bongo Comics ===
- Treehouse of Horror #11 (2005)

=== Chaos Comics ===
- The Mummy: Valley of the Gods #1 (2001)

=== Dark Horse Comics ===
- The Curse of Dracula #1–3 (1998)
- Michael Chabon Presents the Amazing Adventures of the Escapist #3 (2004)

=== DC Comics ===
- 9–11: The World's Finest Comic Book Writers & Artists Tell Stories to Remember, Volume Two (2002)
- Action Comics #513–516, 525–536, 539–546, 551–554, 556, 613–618, 627–628, 778, 1000 (1980–2018)
- Adventure Comics #417, 421, 424, 474, 479–487 (1972–1981)
- Adventures of Superman #424–435, 591 (1987–2001)
- Aquaman Giant #1 (2019)
- Batman #328–335, 436–451 (1980–1990)
- Batman and the Outsiders #5 (1983)
- Batman Black and White vol. 2 #3 (2014)
- The Best of DC #18 (New Teen Titans) (1981)
- Blackhawk #242 (1968)
- The Brave and the Bold #167 (1980)
- The Brave and the Bold vol. 3 #17–18 (2008)
- Convergence: Adventures of Superman #1–2 (2015)
- Convergence: New Teen Titans #1–2 (2015)
- Crisis on Infinite Earths #1–12 (1985–1986)
- Crisis on Infinite Earths Giant #1–2 (with Marc Guggenheim) (2019)
- Cyborg #10–12, 21–23 (2016–2018)
- DC Challenge #11–12 (1986)
- DC Comics Presents No. 26, 77–78 Annual #1 (1980–1985)
- DC Comics Presents: Justice League of America #1 (2004)
- DC Primal Age #1 (2019)
- DC Retroactive: Superman – The '80s #1 (2011)
- DC's Batman Smells, Robin Laid an Egg #1 (2024)
- DC Special: Raven #1–5 (2008)
- DC: The Doomed and the Damned #1 (2020)
- DC Universe Online: Legends #1, 3, 5, 7, 9–11, 13, 15, 18–26 (2011–2012)
- Deathstroke the Terminator/Deathstroke the Hunted/Deathstroke #1–11, 13–21, 26–39, 41–60, 0, Annual #1, 3–4 (1991–1996)
- Detective Comics No. 408, 615, 625–628, 1027 (1971, 1990–1991, 2020)
- Eight Legged Freaks #1 (2002)
- Flash #750 (2020)
- Green Lantern vol. 2 #133–153 (1980–1982)
- Green Lantern 80-Page Giant #2 (1999)
- Green Lantern/Plastic Man: Weapons of Mass Deception #1 (2011)
- History of the DC Universe #1–2 (1987)
- House of Mystery #176, 179–180, 182–183, 300 (1968–1982)
- House of Secrets #82–84, 87–88, 90, 127 (1969–1975)
- Infinite Crisis Secret Files and Origins #1 (2006)
- Legends of the DC Universe #18 (1999)
- Legends of the DC Universe 80-Page Giant #1 (1998)
- Legends of the DC Universe: Crisis on Infinite Earths #1 (1999)
- Legion of Super-Heroes vol. 2 #272 (1981)
- Looney Tunes #218 (2014)
- Man and Superman #1 (2019)
- Man Called A-X vol. 2 #1–8 (1997–1998)
- Mystery in Space #116 (1981)
- The New Teen Titans #1–40, Annual #1–2 (1980–1984)
- The New Teen Titans vol. 2 #1–49, Annual #1–4 (1984–1988)
- The New Teen Titans Drug Awareness Special #1–3 (1983)
- The New Teen Titans: Games GN (2011)
- The New Titans #50–86, 88–93, 97–130, #0, Annual #5–11 (1988–1995)
- Night Force #1–14 (1982–1983)
- Night Force vol. 2 #1–12 (1996–1997)
- Night Force vol. 3 #1–7 (2012)
- Nightwing vol. 2 #125–137 (2006–2007)
- Nightwing vol. 3 #113 (#300) (two pages) (2024)
- Omega Men #24 (1985)
- Phantom Stranger vol. 2 #23–26 (1973)
- Plop! #14 (1975)
- Raven #1–6 (2016–2017)
- Raven: Daughter of Darkness #1–12 (2018–2019)
- Robin 80th Anniversary 100-Page Super Spectacular #1 (2020)
- Secret Origins vol. 2 #46 (1989)
- Secret Origins vol. 3 #5 (2014)
- Showcase #78 (1968)
- Showcase '94 #11 (1994)
- Silver Age: Teen Titans #1 (2000)
- Spirit #4 (2010)
- Superboy vol. 5 #26–29 (2014)
- Supergirl #1–2 (1972–1973)
- Superman #248, 352, 422 (1972–1986)
- Superman vol. 2 #169 (2001)
- The Superman Family #203–206, 209 (1980–1981)
- Superman: Kal-El Returns Special #1 (2022)
- Superman: Our Worlds at War Secret Files and Origins #1 (2001)
- Superman: The Man of Steel #113 (2001)
- Tales of the New Teen Titans #1–4 (1982)
- Tales of the Teen Titans #41–58, Annual #3 (1984–1985)
- Tarzan #207–209, 213–216 (1972–1973)
- Team Titans #1–12, Annual #1 (1992–1993)
- Teen Titans #18, 22 (1968–1969)
- Teen Titans vol. 3 #33, 50, Annual #1 (2006–2007)
- Teen Titans vol. 4 #23.1 (Trigon) (2013)
- Teen Titans vol. 6 #16 (2018)
- Teen Titans Spotlight #1–6 (1986–1987)
- Titans #25 (2001)
- Titans Secret Files and Origins #1 (1999)
- Titans Sell-Out Special #1 (1992)
- Vigilante #1–15, 19–20 (1983–1985)
- Vigilante vol. 3 #1–12 (2009–2010)
- Weird War Tales #3, 6 (1972)
- Weird Worlds #1–7 (1972–1973)
- The Witching Hour #13 (1971)
- Wonder Woman #287, 294 (1982)
- Wonder Woman: Agent of Peace #10 (digital) (2020)
- World's Finest Comics #288, 300 (1983–1984)

==== WildStorm ====
- Farscape: War Torn #1–2 (2002)
- God of War #1–6 (2010–2011)
- Robo Dojo #1–6 (2002)
- The X-Files vol. 2 #3–4 (2009)

=== Devil's Due Publications ===
- Defex #1–6 (2004–2005)

=== Disney Comics ===
- Disney Adventures Digest Special Edition (1990)
- Goofy Adventures #17 (1991)
- Mickey Mouse Adventures #5, 9, 11, 14 (1990–1991)

=== Eclipse Comics ===
- Total Eclipse (1988)

=== First Comics ===
- Sable #1–7, 9–10, 12–23 (1988–1990)

=== Gladstone Publishing ===
- Duck Tales ("Scrooge's Quest") (1990)

=== IDW Publishing ===
- Gene Pool OGN (with Len Wein) (2003)

=== Image Comics ===
- 10th Muse #1–9 (2000–2002)
- Brigade #17–22 (1995)

=== Malibu Comics ===
- Codename: Firearm #0, 2, 4–5 (1995)
- Man Called A-X #1–4, #0 (1994–1995)
- Ultraforce #8–9 (1995)
- Ultraforce/Spider-Man #1A-B (1996)
- Witch #1 (1989)

=== Marvel Comics ===
- Amazing Adventures #20 (1973)
- The Amazing Spider-Man #182–204, Annual #13 (1978–1980)
- The Amazing Spider-Man vol. 6 #50 (2024)
- Avengers #169 (1978)
- Blade: Movie Preview (1997)
- Bullseye #1 (2017)
- Captain America #192 (1975)
- Captain Marvel #23 (1972)
- Crazy Magazine #2, 11 (1974–1975)
- Daredevil #125–139, 141–143, Annual #4 (1975–1977)
- Doctor Strange #19–20, 22–23, Annual #1 (1976–1977)
- Dracula Lives #2–5 (1973–1974)
- Fantastic Four #190, 195–216, Annual #12, 14 (1978–1980)
- Ghost Rider #20 (1976)
- Giant-Size Chillers Featuring Curse of Dracula #1 (1974)
- Giant-Size Fantastic Four #3 (1974)
- Giant-Size Man-Thing #5 (1975)
- Howard the Duck #28 (1978)
- John Carter, Warlord of Mars #1–15, Annual #1, 3 (1977–1979)
- Journey into Mystery #520–521 (1998)
- Legion of Monsters #1 (1975)
- Machine Man #10–14 (1979–1980)
- Marvel Comics Presents #38–47 (1989–1990)
- Marvel Fanfare #16–17 (1984)
- Marvel Movie Premiere #1 (The Land That Time Forgot adaptation) (1975)
- Marvel Premiere #39–40 (1977–1978)
- Marvel Preview #1, 8, 16 (1975–1978)
- Marvel Spotlight vol. 2 #5 (1980)
- Marvel Super Special #15 (Star Trek: The Motion Picture adaptation) (1979)
- Marvel Team-Up #98 (1980)
- Marvel Team-Up vol. 2 #7 (1998)
- Marvel Two-in-One #13, 25–37, 44, 59, Annual #3 (1976–1980)
- Mission Impossible #1 (1996)
- Monsters Unleashed #1 (1973)
- Nova #1–25 (1976–1979)
- Power Man #37–46 (1976–1977)
- Shadows & Light #2 (1998)
- Skull the Slayer #1–3 (1975–1976)
- The Spectacular Spider-Man #44 (1980)
- Spider-Woman #1–8 (1978)
- Spoof #2–5 (1972–1973)
- Star Trek #4 (1980)
- Sub-Mariner #70–71 (1974)
- Tales of the Zombie #1 (1973)
- The Tomb of Dracula #7–70 (1973–1979)
- The Tomb of Dracula vol. 2 #1–3 (1979–1980)
- The Tomb of Dracula vol. 3 #1–4 (1991–1992)
- Tower of Shadows #4 (1970)
- Two-Gun Kid #104 (1972)
- Vampire Tales #8–9 (1974–1975)
- Venom: Sinner Takes All #5 (1995)
- Werewolf by Night #11–15 (1973–1974)
- What If...? #5 (1979)
- What If...? Dark: Tomb of Dracula oneshot (2023)

==== Epic Comics ====
- The Tomb of Dracula vol. 3 #1–4 (1991–1992)

=== Moonstone ===
- Captain Action Comics #2–3 (with Fabian Nicieza) (2009)

=== Nachshon Press ===
- Homeland OGN (2007)

=== Now Comics ===
- Mirror Walker #1 (1989)

=== Renaissance Press ===
- The Forbidden Book Vol. 1 (2001)

=== S.Q.P. Inc. ===
- Phase #1 (1971)

=== Skywald Publications ===
- Nightmare #2, 6 (1971)
- Psycho #2–5, 7–8, 14 (1971–1973)

=== TSR, Inc. ===
- R.I.P. #1–2, 4 (1990)

=== Warren Publications ===
- Eerie #33, 47 (1971–1973)

=== Zenescope ===
- Mankind: The Story of All of Us Vol. 1 (2012)

Preceded by Gardner Fox	The Tomb of Dracula writer 1973–1979	Succeeded by n/a
Preceded by Len Wein	Marvel Comics Editor-in-Chief; 1975–1976	Succeeded by Gerry Conway
Preceded by Bob Brown and Tony Isabella	Daredevil writer 1975–1977	Succeeded by Gerry Conway and Jim Shooter
Preceded by Len Wein	Thor writer 1976 (with Len Wein)	Succeeded by Len Wein
Preceded by Len Wein	Fantastic Four writer 1978–1980	Succeeded by John Byrne
Preceded by Len Wein	The Amazing Spider-Man writer 1978–1980	Succeeded by Dennis O'Neil
Preceded by Bob Rozakis	The New Teen Titans writer 1980–1996	Succeeded by Dan Jurgens
Preceded by Cary Bates	Action Comics writer 1980–1984	Succeeded by Paul Kupperberg
Preceded by Len Wein	Batman writer 1980–1981	Succeeded by Bob Rozakis and Roy Thomas
Preceded by Paul Kupperberg	Green Lantern writer 1980–1982	Succeeded by Mike W. Barr
Preceded by Doug Moench	Omega Men writer 1985	Succeeded by Todd Klein
Preceded by n/a	Vigilante writer 1983–1984	Succeeded by Paul Kupperberg
Preceded by John Byrne	Batman writer 1989–1990	Succeeded by Peter Milligan
Preceded by Bruce Jones	Nightwing writer 2006–2007	Succeeded by Fabian Nicieza
