= List of Hack/Slash story arcs =

The following is a list of Hack/Slash story arcs, appearing in their original order of publication.

== One-Shots/Limited Series ==
=== Euthanized ===
Vlad and Cassie must battle Bobby, a vengeful, undead slasher with the ability to control dead animals. Bobby was revealed to have been a mentally handicapped veterinary assistant accidentally murdered by the vet's fiance, who was jealous of their friendship. This issue has a 4-page origin for Cassie, whose mother's backstory as a killer and slasher are yet to be expanded upon.

=== Girls Gone Dead ===
Vlad and Cassie battle Father Wrath, a slasher being controlled by a devoutly crazy Catholic schoolgirl, Laura Lochs. Father Wrath was a traveling Baptist preacher, who was murdered by his nephew when he tried to sexually assault him. The revived Wrath emerged as an evil killer.

=== Comic Book Carnage ===
Vlad and Cassie must deal with a human murderer, Lloyd Sundermann with a parasitic twin, Jimmy at a comic book convention. Breaking the fourth wall of sorts, the murderer and his brother go after Steve Niles, Scottie Young, and Robert Kirkman, real-life comic book creators, and murder them for turning an "innocent" golden age hero into a brooding "modern" hero.

=== The Final Revenge of Evil Ernie ===
Cassie and Vlad battle Evil Ernie, who awakens in a new reality (the Hack/Slash world) with Ernie falling in love with Cassie. After Cassie is fatally wounded, Ernie sacrifices his life to revive her, and is reborn in a new reality elsewhere.

=== Land of Lost Toys ===
Cassie and Vlad battle an undead child, Ashley Guthrie, with the ability to kill people in their dreams. They find out his mother killed him (because he was a horrible child), but he was reborn in the dream plane (à la Freddy Krueger) and uses toys to murder his victims. Cassie kills Ashley, but his spirit possesses the teddy bear his mother smothered him with. Vlad's origin has a four-page spread similar to Cassie's.

=== Trailers ===
Short 2–3 page "trailers" of books. So far, only "Tub Club" has been fully expanded, but one of the stories evolves out of "Girls Gone Dead" and "Comic Book Carnage", leading to "Vs Chucky". One of the trailers has Cassie and Vlad take down slasher Hibachi Devil, who reappears in "Slice Hard".

=== 25-cent Preview ===
"Euthanized"'s 4 page spread (Cassie's origin) is reprinted, along with a lead-in to "Slice Hard" where Vlad and Cassie are captured by a corporation.

=== Slice Hard ===
Several slashers (Hibachi Devil, Acid Angel, Mortimer Strick, X-O, and Waking Man), most featured in Cassie's origin, and never actually encountered in the comic series to date, are held prisoner by a company run by Emily Christy, a former Ms. America, that wants to use the slashers to develop anti-aging remedies. If a captured Cassie agrees to help capture the slashers, the company promises to use plastic surgery on Vlad. Ashley, now in a stuffed bear body, has other ideas when it breaks in and frees the slashers, who go after the director, Cassie, and Vlad. In the process, all the slashers are defeated, but Christy uses the "slasher formula" on herself, becoming a new slasher, named Ms. America.

=== Vs. Chucky ===
Cassie and Vlad take on Chucky in a story taking place after the film Seed of Chucky. Serves as a sequel to "Girls Gone Dead". Laura Lochs uses an ancient relic to body swap out of her currently burnt to a crisp remains and into the body of none other than Vlad. It then falls upon Cassie, Vlad (Now in Laura Loch's body) and Chucky to end the now near unstoppable Loch's evil plans before she can kill several of Cassie's close friends, all having been captured and used in Laura's sick game of revenge. Cassie must also deal with the unlikely and deadly partnership with Chucky, whom she knows all too well can turn and try to kill her at any given moment.

=== Hack/Slash vs. Halloween Man ===
It was announced that a crossover with webcomic Halloween Man. Chapter 1 was released online on October 15.

=== Entry Wound ===
A cosmic disturbance (caused by Mary Shelley Lovecraft battling a number of superheroes in another dimension) results in all holiday themed slashers to awaken early, prompting Cassie and Vlad to begin frantically hunting them all down. The main villain of the story is Peter Lapage (the Candlemas Murderer) a Pennsylvania centered slasher based on Groundhog Day.

=== The Living Corpse Annual ===
In the middle of the woods a pair of campers are frightened away by the Jersey Devil, who in turn is sent home by the Living Corpse. After encountering the fleeing campers Cassie and Vlad go looking for the Jersey Devil, finding it in an abandoned house and dispatching of it with surprising ease, enraging the creature's witch parent Mother Leeds. On the way back to the van Vlad runs into and briefly fights Corpse, but the two are broken up by Cassie (who is acquainted with Corpse). As Cassie and Corpse exchange pleasantries Mother Leeds attacks, wanting revenge for the death of her son (who Corpse states was actually harmless and the only thing keeping the unstable Mother Leeds in check). Producing a never ending stream of ferocious demon "children" Mother Leeds is killed when Vlad stops her spawn from exiting her body by forcibly cramming Corpse up inside her, causing the witch to explode from the pressure.

=== My First Maniac ===
A four issue miniseries, and the first Hack/Slash books to be published by Image, the series explores Cassie's teenage years, showing her life directly after the second death of her mother, and before she met Vlad. After doing some research regarding the possible existence of slashers (through urban legends), Cassie decides to leave her foster home and travels to Manchester, Iowa, where there's a legend of an undead farmer that kills those who trespass on his land. Cassie, though becoming comfortable with the local teens, soon discovers that the slasher is actually the angry spirit of a rebellious young man named "Matthew," who is now known as a slasher called "Grinface" and has help committing his murders by his killer/girlfriend Sarah (a teen Cassie befriended). In the end, Grinface turns on Sarah and is killed by Cassie, who fulfills Sarah's dying wish of destroying her body (so she wouldn't become a slasher).

The miniseries ends with Cassie sneaking up and attacking Vlad in Chicago, whom she believes to be a slasher.

=== A Slice of Hell ===
Crossover with Devil's Due Publishing character Mercy Sparx. Limited to one-thousand copies, the one-shot (released in November) was only available for purchase through Devil's Due's online store, though copies with an alternative cover were sold at Detroit Fanfare on October 30–31.

=== Trailers Part Two ===
An anthology comic released in November 2010 featuring 13 short stories drawn by various artists.

=== Hatchet/Slash ===
A crossover with Hatchet.

=== The Crow/Hack/Slash ===
A crossover with The Crow.

== Ongoing series ==
=== Hack/Slash: The Series (Volume 1) ===
==== Gross Anatomy (#1) ====
Cassie was used as bait to lure in a slasher, who captures her and tortures her by removing two of her toes in between flashbacks to Hack/Slash: Euthanized (the original one-shot). Vlad frees her and Cassie breaks down to tears at where their life has gotten her.

==== Shout at The Devil (#2–4) ====
Cassie is sent to the hell dimension of Nef by a rock singer who bargained success for the ritual periodic sacrifice of virgins, and once again it is up to Vlad to save the situation, losing his virginity to be able to take Cassie back.

==== Love Stories (#5) ====
Emily Cristy aka Ms. America is brought back by a group of scientists who are attempting to understand how "Revenants" (i.e., Slashers) are made. Ms. America escapes, killing one of the scientists and stealing his skin.

Cassie and Vlad take a backseat in this issue and their story involves Vlad being ill and Cassie selling her mother's wedding ring so they have enough money to stay in a motel, which will be better for his health.

Also Chris and Lisa have a side-story involving a confrontation with Lisa's ex-boyfriend Kyle (last seen in Hack/Slash: Euthanized). Afterwards, Chris and Lisa begin a (mostly physical) relationship.

==== Double Date (#6) ====
A slightly tongue-in-cheek issue done in the style of Archie Comics surrounding the return of Father Wrath, who turns out not to be the original Slasher seen in Hack/Slash: Girls Gone Dead but a teenager named Samuel Lawrence. Samuel is revealed to be Father Wrath's nephew before he is killed by Vlad.

==== Tub Club (#7–9) ====
Cassie and Vlad investigate a college in Massachusetts where a series of corpses have been discovered, which have been reduced to a pile of flesh. Cassie and Vlad's relationship is somewhat rocky due to the amount of time Cassie has been spending on the phone with Georgia. After Vlad is attacked, Cassie begins questioning the local students and discovers that a number of them are lesbians who are involved in a cult surrounding the mythology of Elizabeth Bathory.

After accidentally kissing one of the students, Cassie interrogates her to find out more information about the cult. Before the student, Amber, can lead her to the cult's base of operations, Cassie encounters a government team who are also investigating the situation. One of the team admits that they worked for Cassie's father, Dr. Jack Hack and tells Cassie that he knows how to find him.

Cassie, Vlad and the government team are led by Amber into the cult's underground base. They are attacked by Ms. America, who has become stronger by stealing the blood and skin of students in an attempt to regain her original beauty. After a long battle, Vlad, now more comfortable with his own deformities, impales Ms. America. Afterwards, Cassie and Vlad reconcile, though Cassie is uncertain of her feelings towards Georgia.

==== Little Children (#10) ====
Following the clue given to them by the government agent at the college, Cassie and Vlad investigate a cabin in Montana in the hopes of finding information about Cassie's father: Dr. Jack Hack. They find a series of journals describing government-sponsored research performed on a group of feral children. The children were injected with a drug called "Rev-D", which theoretically will turn them into "Revenants" i.e., Slashers.

Just as Cassie and Vlad are preparing to leave with the journals, the cabin is fire-bombed by the children. Cassie and Vlad manage to escape from the burning cabin but Vlad refuses to hurt the children as it is against his moral code. Upon escaping, Cassie shoots the children, something that Vlad is not comfortable with. At the end, Cassie, in need of comfort, phones Georgia.

==== The Coldest Dish (#11) ====
Cassie and Vlad hunt down Nathan, a one-eyed vigilante, who Cassie believes is a Slasher. However, he is actually hunting down the men he holds responsible for killing his wife and mutilating him. Nathan gets his revenge but dies from a gunshot wound. Between Slasher activity, Cassie attempts to track down her father using a list of government-created false identities she found in the Montana cabin, while at the same time still pondering her feelings for Georgia.

Meanwhile, "Pooch" (the demonic dog from Shout at The Devil) has come to Earth looking for Cassie. As Cassie is busy, she asks Chris to track him down. Using items of Cassie's as bait, Chris locates Pooch and the pair of them return to Chris and Lisa's.

==== Murder/Suicide (Hack/Slash Annual) ====
Chris alerts Cassie and Vlad to the mysterious simultaneous suicides of a number of SuicideGirls. It turns out that the deaths are the work of D1ab0liq, a megalomaniacal and misanthropic blogger and thrill-killer who was electrocuted in a fight with police after being turned in by his Suicide Girl girlfriend. Now an undead entity existing as pure information on the internet, D1ab0liq is capable of possessing people via their computers and forcing them to kill themselves and others. Cassie joins the Suicide Girls website and posts an erotic photoset as an attempt to lure D1ab0liq into attacking her. Cassie and Vlad manage to at least temporarily destroy D1ab0liq, but at the cost of the life of a Suicide Girl whose body he was possessing at the time.

==== BUMPed (#12–13) ====
The story begins with Cassie having another in a series of recurring nightmares about Milk & Cheese. Afterwards, Cassie and Vlad decide to investigate the "Hitchfield Massacre" that has been headlining the newspapers. They investigate the scene where several college girls disappeared and find torn clothing, claw marks and encounter a reporter named Phil O'Grady who is also investigating the murders. While Phil shows Cassie a recording of one of the killings a local policewoman is violently killed by a treehugger – presumably the same creature responsible for the killings. The creature moves on to attack the Phil's trailer and eventually Vlad kills the treehugger.

Following the trail of treehuggers, the group eventually discover a clearing in the forest containing a dilapidated house. Inside they discover a display of human flesh, a horde of treehuggers and eventually encounter Eddie, the creator and puppetmaster of the treehuggers. After a prolonged battle between Vlad and Eddie, Phil pushes Eddie down into the basement. Cassie and Vlad follow, only to discover that Eddie has murdered and mutilated Phil. They also find a store of "empty" treehuggers awaiting trapped souls, including one labelled "Kassy". Determined to put an end to the treehuggers, they decide to burn the house down and leave, but are aware that Eddie is still alive.

Meanwhile, we discover that an elderly woman named Muffy Joworski (who we were briefly introduced to in Hack/Slash #10) has been tracking Cassie's movements and believes that she is not only responsible for the killings but is in fact "the most prolific serial killer in the world".

At the same time, we see a pair of hired workmen digging up the coffin of Delilah Hack aka The Lunch Lady.

==== Over The Rainbow (#14) ====
Georgia joins a film crew making a remake of The Wizard of Oz after hearing of a murder on set that appears to be the work of a slasher. However, she is on the point of being killed by the slasher when Cassie and Vlad arrive, and is only rescued in the nick of time. Cassie is initially outraged that Georgia has put herself in danger trying to help her, but finally admits how much Georgia means to her, and kisses her non-sexually.

Meanwhile, Muffy Jaworski has a vision of the murders committed by Father Wrath in Girls Gone Dead, but sees Cassie as the killer.

Finally, Cassie's father Jack Hack at last appears in the comic, meeting Dr. Herbert West in the basement of a head shop.

==== Cassie and Vlad Meet the Re-Animator (#15–17) ====
Following the list of false identities from Montana, Cassie and Vlad finally find Jack, who is collaborating with Herbert West in an attempt to resurrect Cassie's mother, Delilah, and bring her back to sanity. It turns out that Jack was involved with the sinister government agency that has been researching slashers, and was studying Delilah because her psychological profile suggested that she might become one. However, he fell in love with her and married her, but finally abandoned Cassie and Delilah when the agency tried to force him to accelerate Delilah's potential transformation. Unfortunately, before the family can be reconciled, an only half-restored and still unstable Delilah breaks free. In the resulting mayhem, Delilah eventually kills Jack, and Cassie is forced to help West to kill her mother yet again. Cassie reluctantly allows West to go free.

Meanwhile, the Lords of Nef, angered by Pooch's failure to fulfil his mission, select a female demonic warrior and send her to Earth with orders to kill Cassie.

==== Closer (#18–20) ====
After losing both her parents again, Cassie becomes an emotional wreck and so Vlad phones Georgia in the hope that Cassie will open up to someone. Upon her arrival, Cassie breaks down in her arms leaving Vlad feeling worthless and he retreats to a bar. Cassie and Georgia continue to talk and Cassie confesses that she wants to simply be a normal girl. After a soft kiss, the two of them begin to make out. Vlad returns from the bar to overhear muffled kissing, causing him to become even more jealous.

Muffy Joworski continues to investigate slasher incidents, however all leads indicate Cassie is the killer. Therefore, when Cassie goes to the police station to offer information, she is arrested on suspicion of a series of murders.

Elsewhere, a demon assassin arrives from Nef with the goal of eliminating both the traitorous Pooch and Cassie. This results in an attack on Lisa and Chris' house by the assassin, who uses Lisa's ex-boyfriend Kyle as a hostage. However, Pooch leads away the assassin in order to save his new masters and is almost killed in the process. Vlad confronts Georgia about his feelings on the two of them, but is interrupted by a call from Cassie asking for help. Vlad visits Cassie in jail and they deduce that the false visions are coming from Ashley Guthrie, the only slasher they've encountered who can influence dreams. This does not convince the police and Cassie is taken to another facility. However, in transit the van is attacked and Cassie is kidnapped by a group called the "Black Lamp Society", who try to sacrifice her for her "crimes" against slashers. The arc ends with her being rescued by a mysterious masked man called Samhain.

==== Mind Killer (#21–22) ====
Cassie awakens after sleeping for two days, once again safe in her van with Vlad and Georgia. They are soon reunited with Gertrude Hall (last seen in Shout at the Devil). The group end up getting in a brawl and are thrown in jail.

Ashley's hold over Muffy Joworski becomes more powerful and he possesses her body in order to go after Cassie, enlisting the aid of banished rocker Six Sixx in order to do it. However, he accidentally unleashes more creatures from a hell dimension who capture and torture the group. Six Sixx manages to break free and, after having his powers recharged in Nef, returns to free his fellow hostages. He then returns to Nef with Muffy/Ashley as a payment to his masters for his newly restored abilities.

Upon returning to the hotel room a naked Georgia surprises Cassie and suggests they have sex but Cassie turns her down. She then tells Georgia that she is going to continue hunting slashers and that her time with Georgia was a "mistake" because she was wrong about her sexuality.

==== Double Feature (#23) ====
14 years ago, a young "Nancy Drew type" girl named Cat thinks she has found a clue in a crime that has been overlooked by police investigators. However, the police accuse her of being a pest and she decides to investigate it alone. She discovers an item in a house that contains a black oil, which when burned gives off a unique black flame. Then, using her spy equipment, she overhears the residents of the house talking about the Black Lamp Society. However, she is discovered and stabbed by a pumpkin-masked Samhain.

Back in the present, Cassie and Lisa are shopping for gear to aid in the hunting of the "Snow Blower" who has been killing local dogs. They decide to use Pooch as bait and soon enough Cassie and Lisa confront the slasher. Meanwhile, at Lisa and Chris's house, the rest of the gang are enjoying Christmas festivities and Gertrude comforts Georgia about her break-up with Cassie.

==== Sons Of Man (#24–25) ====
Samhain enlists the help of Cassie and Vlad in an attempt to bring down the Black Lamp Society. Samhain reveals to them the origin of Slashers as well as the fact that he is one, albeit a reformed one. Together, the trio attempt to infiltrate the Society's base and encounter some of the society's mutated creations.

During the fighting Samhain is captured and reprogrammed to be a Slasher once more, starting his killing spree with his ex-lover Ava Park. However, a passionate kiss from Cassie breaks his brainwashing. Together they eliminate one of the Society's leaders and escape.

Elsewhere, Julian the Mosaic Man (an early Hack/Slash villain) tries to attack a woman but is stopped by her best friend who is mysteriously able to control the undead. In another subplot it is also revealed that Lisa Elsten is pregnant.

==== Foes and Fortune (#26–27) ====
Sightings of Santa Muerte (the Mexican Saint of Good Luck and Love) in Chicago coincide with the return of Julian the Mosaic Man. It is revealed that Libby Lochs (the sister of Laura Lochs) is controlling Julian and is seeking revenge on Cassie and Vlad. The return to Chicago is difficult for Vlad as it was there that he was suspected of being the killer in the "Meat Man" killings.

==== Something's Fishy (#28) ====
Cassie and Vlad return to the idyllic town of Haverhill, which is beset by Mary Shelley Lovecraft and her Franken-Deep Ones. Mary's goal is take a groom whilst attempting to remake the world in fiction. Her first target is Taber, however when confronted by Cassie, she offers herself to her both in the form of Georgia and Samhain. However, to her surprise Taber breaks from his pacifist persona and provides a distraction for Cassie and Vlad to defeat Mary. In the fallout from the event, Haverhill loses its innocence and its people are left scarred by the events.

==== Super Sidekick Sleepover Slaughter prelude (#29) ====
In a flashback we are shown the history of Nightmare and Sleepy, a duo of Slasher slayers who have a connect to Samhain. We follow their history over two decades and two incarnations of the crimefighting duo. In the present day, radio DJ Alan Knight features news of Cassie and Vlad's recent activities.

==== Hack/Slash Annual: Murder Messiah ====
The second annual, the story has Cassie and Vlad deal with a deranged serial killer, and Cassie's self-proclaimed biggest fan, who is "cleaning up her loose ends", while, fourteen years in the future, Liberty Lochs (who is in search of Six Sixx's demonically powered guitar) battles the Black Lamp Society, which has taken over America.

=== Volume 2 ===
==== Interdimensional Women's Prison Breakout (#9-11) ====
A group of super villains escape from an inter dimensional prison, including Bomb Queen.
