= Breakdown (comics) =

Breakdown was a comic published by Devil's Due Productions as part of their Aftermath line. It began in October 2004, and was written by Chuck Dixon, and drawn by Dave Ross.

The story is set around Jeff Carey, who, when he discovers/receives his powers, decides to use them for good, as Paragon, the world's first superhero. He battles evil superhumans, such as Humongulous and Cactus Rose. He is loved by the media, by his wife, and by his daughter. One day, he is given a mysterious warning by a woman in a crowd. That night, his family is attacked. Only he survives, and his face is ruined. He tracks down the woman who warned him.

A year later, the special prison which houses Humongulous is attacked by a man with the same powers as Paragon. However, he wears a mask, and shares none of Paragon's morality...

As of Issue #2, it is revealed that Jeff Carey received his powers from his father. Where his father got them is unclear, but is likely to involve a secret organization known as the Black Ring.

The first arc consisted of 6 issues.

== See also ==
- List of Devil's Due Publishing publications
