= List of Charlton Comics publications =

This is a list of Charlton Comics publications.

Title	Series	Issues	Dates	Notes
Abbott and Costello		#1 – 22	Feb. 1968 – Aug. 1971	Based on the TV series
All-American Sports		#1	October 1967	
Army Attack	series 1	#1 – 4	July 1964 – Feb. 1965	
Army Attack	series 2	#38 – 47	July 1965 – Feb. 1967	formerly U.S. Air Force Comics
Army War Heroes		#1 – 38	Dec. 1963 – June 1970	Also see The Iron Corporal
Atom the Cat		#9 – 17	Oct. 1957 – Aug. 1959	formerly Tom Cat
Atomic Bunny		#12 – 19	Aug. 1958 – Dec. 1959	formerly Atomic Rabbit
Atomic Mouse		#1 – 54	March 1953 – June 1963	
Atomic Mouse	series 2	#1, 10 – 12	Dec. 1984 – Jan. 1986	Low print run
Atomic Rabbit		#1 – 11	Aug. 1955 – March 1958	Atomic Bunny from #12 onward
Attack!	series 2	#54 – 60	? 1958 – Nov. 1959	war comic
Attack!	series 3	#1 – 3	? 1962 – Fall 1964	war comic
Attack!	series 4	#3, 4	Oct. 1966 – Oct. 1967	formerly Special War Series, becomes Attack at Sea
Attack!	series 5	#1 – 48	Sept. 1971 – Oct. 1984	
Attack at Sea		#5	Oct. 1968	formerly Attack! vol. 4
Badge of Justice		#1 – 4	January 1955–October 1955	formerly Crime and Justice
Barney and Betty Rubble		#1 – 23	Jan. 1973 – Dec. 1976	Based on The Flintstones
Barney Google and Snuffy Smith		#1 – 6	March 1970 – Jan. 1971	Based on the comic strip
Battlefield Action		#16 – 62	Nov. 1957 – ? 1966	formerly Foreign Intrigues
Battlefield Action	series 2	#63 – 89	July 1980 – Nov. 1984	
Billy the Kid		#9 – 153	Nov. 1957 – March 1983	formerly The Masked Raider
The Bionic Woman		#1 – 5	Oct. 1977 – June 1978	Based on the TV series
Black Fury		#1 – 57	May 1955 – ? 1966	becomes Wild West
Blondie Comics		#177 – 222	Feb. 1969 – Nov. 1976	continued from King Comics series
Blue Beetle	series 2	#18 – 21	Feb. 1955 – Aug. 1955	formerly The Thing!, becomes Mr. Muscles
Blue Beetle	series 3	#1 – 5	June 1964 – March–April 1965	superhero comic; scarab-powered Dan Garrett II version
Blue Beetle	series 4	#50 – 54	July 1965 – Feb.–March 1966	formerly Unusual Tales, becomes Ghostly Tales
Blue Beetle	series 5	#1 – 5	June 1967 – Nov. 1968	superhero comic; Ted Kord version, unpublished #6 appeared in The Charlton Portfolio
Bo		#1 – 3	June 1955 – Oct. 1955	
Brenda Starr		#13 – 15	June 1955 – Oct. 1955	reprints Brenda Starr, Reporter newspaper strips
Brides in Love		#1 – 45	Aug. 1956 – Feb. 1965	becomes Summer Love
Bullwinkle & Rocky		#1 – 7	July 1970 – July 1971	Based on the TV series
Captain Atom	series 2	#78 – 89	Dec. 1965 – Dec. 1967	formerly Strange Suspense Stories, unpublished #90 appeared in Charlton Bullseye #1, 2
Captain Gallant of the Foreign Legion		#1 – 4	? 1955 – Jan. 1956	Issue #1 promotional comic from Heinz
Captain Willy Schultz		#76, 77	Oct. 1985 – Jan. 1986	Low print run
Career Girl Romances		#24 – 78	June 1964 – Dec. 1973	formerly Three Nurses
Charlie Chan		#6 – 9	June 1955 – March 1956	continued from Crestwood Publications series, becomes Zaza the Mystic
Charlton Action: featuring Static		#11 – 12	Oct. 1985 – Dec. 1985	Low print run
Charlton Bullseye		#1 – 10	June 1981 – Dec. 1982	After cancellation, stories appeared in Scary Tales.
Charlton Classics		#1 – 9	April 1980 – Aug. 1981	
Charlton Premiere	series 1	#19	July 1967	formerly Marine War Heroes
Charlton Premiere	series 2	#1 – 4	Sept. 1967 – May 1968	
Cheyenne Kid		#8 – 99	July 1957 – Nov. 1973	formerly Wild Frontier
Cody Of The Pony Express		#8 – 10	Oct. 1955 – June 1956	becomes Outlaws Of The West
Confidential Diary		#12 – 17	May 1962 – March 1963	formerly High School Confidential Diary, becomes Three Nurses
Cowboy Love		#28 – 31	Feb. 1955 – Aug. 1955	continued from Fawcett Comics series, becomes Sweetheart Diary
Cowboy Western Comics		#17 – 67	July 1948 – March 1958	formerly Jack In The Box, issues #40–45 Space Western Comics, becomes Wild Bill Hickok.
Creepy Things		#1 – 6	July 1975 – June 1976	
Danger and Adventure		#22 – 27	Feb. 1955 – Feb. 1956	formerly This Magazine Is Haunted, becomes Robin Hood And His Merry Men
Danny Blaze		#1, 2	Aug. 1955 – Oct. 1955	becomes Nature Boy
David Cassidy		#1 – 14	Feb. 1972 – Sept. 1973	Star of The Partridge Family
Davy Crockett		#1 – 8	Aug. 1955 – Jan. 1957	becomes Kid Montana
D-Day		#1 – 2, 4 – 6 (3 was never published)	Summer 1963 – Nov. 1968	Also see Special War Series
Death Valley		#7 – 9	June 1955 – Oct. 1955	becomes Frontier Scout Daniel Boone
Dino		#1 – 20	Aug. 1973 – Jan. 1977	Based on The Flintstones
Dr. Graves		#73 – 75	Sept. 1985 – Jan. 1986	formerly The Many Ghosts of Doctor Graves
Don Winslow of the Navy		#70 – 73	March 1955 – Sept. 1955	continued from Fawcett Comics series; becomes Fightin' Navy
Doomsday + 1		#1 – 12	July 1975 – May 1979	#7–12 reprints #1–6; unpublished final story appeared in Charlton Bullseye #4, 5.
Drag 'N' Wheels		#30 – 59	Sept. 1968 – May 1973	formerly Top Eliminator
Dragstrip Hotrodders		#1 – 16	Summer 1963 – Aug. 1967	becomes World of Wheels
Dudley Do-Right		#1 – 7	Aug. 1970 – Aug. 1971	Based on the TV series
Dynamite		#1 – 9	May 1953 – Sept. 1954	becomes Johnny Dynamite
E-Man		#1 – 10	Oct. 1973 – Sept. 1975	
Emergency!	(comic book)	#1 – 4	June 1976 – Nov. 1976	Based on the TV series
Emergency!	(magazine)	#1 – 4	June 1976 – Nov. 1976	Black and white magazine version
Fightin' Air Force		#3 – 53	Feb. 1956 – Feb.–March 1966	becomes War and Attack
Fightin' Army		#16 – 172	Jan. 1956 – Nov. 1984	formerly Soldier & Marine Comics
The Fightin' Five		#28 – 49	July 1964 – Dec. 1982	formerly Space War, #42–49 all reprints
Fightin' Marines		#14 – 176	May 1955 – Sept. 1984	continued from St. John Publications series
Fightin' Navy		#74 – 133	Jan. 1956 – Oct. 1984	formerly Don Winslow of the Navy
Flash Gordon		#12 – 18	Feb. 1969 – Jan. 1970	continued from King Comics series
The Flintstones		#1 – 50	Nov. 1970 – Feb. 1977	Based on the TV series
Foreign Intrigues		#14, 15	? 1956 – Aug. 1956	formerly Johnny Dynamite, becomes Battlefield Action
For Lovers Only		#60 – 87	Aug. 1971 – Nov. 1976	formerly Hollywood Romances
Freddy		#12 – 47	June 1958 – Feb. 1965	formerly My Little Margie's Boy Friends
Frontier Scout Daniel Boone		#10 – 13	Jan. 1956 – Aug. 1956	formerly Death Valley, becomes The Masked Raider
Funny Animals		#84 – 91	April 1954 – Feb. 1956	continued from Fawcett Comics series
Funny Animals	series 2	#1, 2	Sept. 1984 – Nov. 1984	Low print run
Ghost Manor		#1 – 19	July 1968 – July 1971	becomes Ghostly Haunts
Ghost Manor	series 2	#1 – 77	Oct. 1971 – Nov. 1984	
Ghostly Haunts		#20 – 58	Sept. 1971 – April 1978	formerly Ghost Manor
Ghostly Tales		#55 – 169	April–May 1966 – Oct. 1984	formerly Blue Beetle vol. 4
Go-Go		#1 – 9	June 1966 – Oct. 1967	
Gorgo		#1 – 23	May 1961 – Sept. 1965	Based on the movie
Gorgo's Revenge		#1	? 1962	becomes The Return of Gorgo
Grand Prix		#16 – 31	Sept. 1967 – May 1970	formerly Hot Rod Racers
The Great Gazoo		#1 – 20	Aug. 1973 – Jan. 1977	Based on The Flintstones
The Green Planet		one-shot	1962	
The Gunfighters		#51 – 85	Oct. 1966 – July 1984	formerly Kid Montana
Gunmaster	series 1	#1 – 4	Sept. 1964 – March–April 1965	western hero
Gunmaster	series 5	#84 – 89	July 1965 – Oct. 1967	formerly Six-Gun Heroes, becomes Judomaster
Hanna-Barbera Parade		#1 – 10	Sept. 1971 – Dec. 1972	
Haunted		#1 – 75	Sept. 1971 – Sept. 1984	Baron Weirwulf's Haunted Library from #21 onward
Haunted Love		#1 – 11	April 1973 – Sept. 1975	
Hee Haw		#1 – 7	July 1970 – Aug. 1971	Based on the TV series
Hercules		#1 – 13	Oct. 1967 – Sept. 1969	
Hi and Lois		#1 – 11	Nov. 1969 – July 1971	Based on the comic strip
High School Confidential Diary		#1 – 11	June 1960 – March 1962	becomes Confidential Diary
Hillbilly Comics		#1 – 4	Aug. 1955 – July 1956	
Hollywood Romances		#46 – 59	Nov. 1966 – June 1971	becomes For Lovers Only
Hong Kong Phooey		#1 – 9	May 1975 – Nov. 1976	Based on the TV series
Hot Rod Racers		#1 – 15	Dec. 1964 – July 1967	becomes Grand Prix
Hot Rods and Racing Cars		#1 – 120	Nov. 1951 – June 1973	
The House of Yang		#1 – 6	July 1975 – June 1976	Also see Yang
Huckleberry Hound		#1 – 8	Nov. 1970 – Jan. 1972	Based on the TV series
I Love You		#7 – 130	Sept. 1955 – May 1980	formerly In Love
In Love		#5, 6	? – July 1955	continued from Mainline Publications series; becomes I Love You
Intimate		#1 – 3	Dec. 1957 – May 1958	becomes Teen-age Love
The Iron Corporal		#23 – 25	Oct. 1985 – Feb. 1986	Low print run
Jack in the Box		#11 – 16	Oct. 1946 – Nov.–Dec. 1947	formerly Yellowjacket Comics, becomes Cowboy Western Comics
The Jetsons		#1 – 20	Nov. 1970 – Dec. 1973	Based on the TV series
Johnny Dynamite		#10 – 12	June 1955 – Oct. 1955	formerly Dynamite, becomes Foreign Intrigues
Judomaster		#89 – 98	May–June 1966 – Dec. 1967	formerly Gunmaster (with two #89's)
Jungle Jim		#22 – 28	Feb. 1969 – Feb. 1970	continued from Dell Comics series
Jungle Tales of Tarzan		#1 – 4	Dec. 1964 – July 1965	series unauthorized by Burroughs. Fifth issue created, but not published.
Just Married		#1 – 114	Jan. 1958 – Dec. 1976	
Kid Montana		#9 – 50	Nov. 1957 – March 1965	formerly Davy Crockett, becomes The Gunfighters
Konga		#1 – 23	? 1960 – Nov. 1965	Based on the movie
Konga's Revenge		#2, 3	Summer 1963 – Fall 1964	formerly The Return of Konga
Korg: 70,000 B.C.		#1 – 9	May 1975 – Nov. 1976	based on the TV series
Lash Larue Western		#47 – 84	March–April 1954 – June 1961	continued from Fawcett Comics series
Lawbreakers Suspense Stories		#10 – 15	Jan. 1953 – Nov. 1953	becomes Strange Suspense Stories
Li'l Genius		#5 – 55	? 1954 – Jan. 1986	continued from Toby Press' Super Brat
Li'l Rascal Twins		#6 – 18	? 1957 – Jan. 1960	formerly Nature Boy
Li'l Tomboy		#92 – 107	Oct. 1956 – Feb. 1960	formerly Funny Animals
Love and Romance		#1 – 24	Sept. 1971 – Sept. 1975	
Love Diary		#1 – 102	July 1958 – Dec. 1976	
The Many Ghosts of Doctor Graves		#1 – 72	May 1967 – May 1982	becomes Doctor Graves
Marines Attack		#1 – 9	Aug. 1964 – Feb.–March 1966	
Marine War Heroes		#1 – 18	Jan. 1964 – March 1967	becomes Charlton Premiere
Marvels of Science		#1 – 4	March 1946 – June 1946	First comic to use name Charlton Comics.
The Masked Raider		#1 – 8	June 1955 – July 1957	becomes Billy the Kid
The Masked Raider	series 2	#14 – 30	Aug. 1958 – June 1961	formerly Frontier Scout Daniel Boone
Midnight Tales		#1 – 18	Dec. 1972 – May 1976	
Mr. Muscles		#22, 23	March 1956 – Aug. 1956	formerly Blue Beetle vol. 2
Monster Hunters		#1 – 18	Aug. 1975 – Feb. 1979	
My Little Margie		#1 – 54	July 1954 – Nov. 1964	Based on the TV series
My Little Margie's Boy Friends		#1 – 11	Aug. 1955 – ? 1958	becomes Freddy
My Little Margie's Fashions		#1 – 5	Feb. 1959 – Nov. 1959	
My Only Love		#1 – 9	July 1975 – Nov. 1976	
My Secret Life		#19 – 47	Aug. 1957 – Sept. 1962	formerly Young Lovers, becomes Sue & Sally Smith
Mysteries of Unexplored Worlds		#1 – 48	Aug. 1956 – Sept. 1965	becomes Son of Vulcan
Mysterious Suspense		#1	Oct. 1968	
Nature Boy		#3 – 5	March 1956 – Feb. 1957	formerly Danny Blaze; becomes Li'l Rascal Twins
Navy War Heroes		#1 – 7	Jan. 1965 – March–April 1965	
Outer Space	series 1	#17 – 25	May 1958 – Dec. 1959	formerly This Magazine Is Haunted
Outer Space	series 2	#1	Nov. 1968	
Outlaws Of The West		#11 – 88	July 1957 – April 1980	formerly Cody of the Pony Express
Out Of This World		#1 – 16	Aug. 1956 – Dec. 1959	
The Partridge Family		#1 – 21	March 1971 – Dec. 1973	Based on the TV series
Peacemaker		#1 – 5	March 1967 – Nov. 1967	Also see The Fightin' Five
Pebbles & Bamm Bamm		#1 – 36	Jan. 1972 – Dec. 1976	Based on The Pebbles and Bamm-Bamm Show
Peter Cannon, Thunderbolt		#51 – 60	March–April 1966 – Nov. 1967	formerly Son of Vulcan
The Phantom		#30 – 74	Feb. 1969 – Jan. 1977	continued from King Comics series
Pictorial Love Stories		#22 – 26	Oct. 1949 – July 1950	formerly Tim McCoy
Popeye the Sailor		#94 – 138	Feb. 1969 – Jan. 1977	continued from King Comics series
Primus		#1 – 7	Feb. 1972 – Oct. 1972	Based on the TV series
Pudgy Pig		#1, 2	Sept. 1958 – Nov. 1958	
Punchy and the Black Crow		#10 – 12	Oct. 1985 – Feb. 1986	Low print run
Range Busters		#8 – 10	May 1955 – Sept. 1955	becomes Wyatt Earp, Frontier Marshal
Reptilicus		#1, 2	Aug. 1961 – Oct. 1961	Based on the movie, becomes Reptisaurus the Terrible
Reptisaurus the Terrible		#3 – #8	Jan. 1962 – Dec. 1962	formerly Reptilicus
The Return of Gorgo		#2, 3	Aug. 1963 – Fall 1964	formerly Gorgo's Revenge
The Return of Konga		#1	? 1962	becomes Konga's Revenge
Robin Hood And His Merry Men		#28 – 38	April 1956 – Aug. 1958	formerly Danger & Adventure
Romantic Secrets		#5 – 52	Oct. 1955 – Nov. 1964	continued from Fawcett Comics series, becomes Time For Love
Romantic Story		#23 – 130	May 1954 – Nov. 1973	continued from Fawcett Comics series
Ronald McDonald		#1 – 4	Sept. 1970 – March 1971	Based on the McDonald's character
Rookie Cop		#27 – 33	Nov. 1955 – Aug. 1957	
Sarge Snorkel		#1 – 17	Oct. 1973 – Dec. 1976	Based on the Beetle Bailey character
Sarge Steel		#1 – 8	Dec. 1964 – March–April 1966	becomes Secret Agent
Scary Tales		#1 – 46	Aug. 1975 – Oct. 1984	
Scooby Doo		#1 – 11	April 1975 – Dec. 1976	Based on the TV series
Secret Agent		#9 – 10	Oct. 1966 – Oct. 1967	formerly Sarge Steel
Secret Romance		#1 – 48	Oct. 1968 – Feb. 1980	
Secrets Of Love And Marriage		#1 – 25	Aug. 1956 – June 1961	
Six Gun Heroes		#24 – 83	Jan. 1954 – March–April 1965	continued from Fawcett Comics series, becomes Gunmaster
The Six Million Dollar Man	(comic book)	#1 – 9	June 1976 – June 1978	Based on the TV series
The Six Million Dollar Man	(magazine)	#1 – 7	July 1976 – Nov. 1977	Black and white magazine version
Soldier & Marine Comics		#9, 11 – 15	Dec. 1954 – Aug. 1955	becomes Fightin' Army
Son of Vulcan		#49, 50	Nov. 1965 – Jan. 1966	formerly Mysteries of Unexplored Worlds, becomes Peter Cannon, Thunderbolt
Space Adventures	series 1	#1 – 21	July 1952 – Aug. 1956	becomes War At Sea
Space Adventures	series 2	#23 – 59	May 1958 – Nov. 1964	
Space Adventures	series 3	#1 – 13	Oct. 1967 – March 1979	#1 is numbered #60 and titled Space Adventures Presents U.F.O.
Space: 1999	(comic book)	#1 – 7	Nov. 1975 – Nov. 1976	Based on the TV series
Space: 1999	(magazine)	#1 – 8	Nov. 1975 – Nov. 1976	Black and white magazine version
Space War		#1 – 27	Oct. 1959 – March 1964	becomes The Fightin' Five
Space War		#28 – 34	March 1978 – March 1979	
Space Western Comics		#40 – 45	Oct. 1952 – Aug. 1953	Also see Cowboy Western Comics
Special War Series		#1 – 4	Aug. 1965 – Nov. 1965	Also see D-Day, War and Attack, Judomaster
Speed Demons		#5 – 10	Feb. 1957 – ? 1958	becomes Submarine Attack
Strange Suspense Stories		#16 – 77	Jan. 1954 – Oct. 1965	formerly Lawbreakers Suspense Stories, issues #23–26 This Is Suspense, becomes Captain Atom
Strange Suspense Stories	series 2	#1 – 9	Oct. 1967 – Sept. 1969	
Submarine Attack		#11 – 54	May 1958 – Feb.–March 1966	formerly Speed Demons
Sue & Sally Smith		#48 – 54	Nov. 1962 – Nov. 1963	formerly My Secret Life
Summer Love		#46 – 48	Oct. 1965 – Nov. 1968	formerly Brides in Love
Super Brat		#1 – 4	Jan. 1954 – July 1954	becomes Li'l Genius
Surf 'N' Wheels		#1 – 6	Nov. 1969 – Sept. 1970	
Sweetheart Diary		#32 – 65	Oct. 1955 – Aug. 1962	formerly Cowboy Love
Sweethearts		#122 – 137	March 1954 – Dec. 1973	continued from Fawcett Comics series; first monthly romance title
Tales of the Mysterious Traveler		#1 – 13	Aug. 1956 – June 1959	
Tales of the Mysterious Traveler	series 2	#14, 15	Oct. 1985 – Dec. 1985	Low print run
Teen Confessions		#1 – 97	Aug. 1959 – Nov. 1976	
Teen-age Confidential Confessions		#1 – 22	July 1960 – ? 1964	
Teen-age Hotrodders		#1 – 24	July 1958 – Dec. 1973	becomes Top Eliminator
Teen-age Love		#4 – 96	July 1958 – Dec. 1973	formerly Intimate
Texas Rangers in Action		#5 – 79	July 1956 – Aug. 1970	
The Thing!		#1 – 17	Feb. 1952 – Nov. 1954	became Blue Beetle vol. 2
This Is Suspense		#23 – 26	Feb. 1955 – Aug. 1955	Also see Strange Suspense Stories
Tennessee Tuxedo		#1 – 9	June 1969 – Dec. 1971	Based on the TV series
This Magazine Is Haunted		#1 – 21	Oct. 1951 – Nov. 1954	becomes Danger and Adventure
This Magazine Is Haunted	series 2	#12 – 16	July 1957 – May 1958	formerly Zaza the Mystic, becomes Outer Space
Three Nurses		#18 – 23	May 1963 – March 1964	formerly Confidential Diary, becomes Career Girl Romances
Tiger		#1 – 6	March 1970 – Jan. 1971	
Tim McCoy		#16 – 21	Oct. 1948 – Aug. 1949	formerly Zoo Funnies, becomes Pictorial Love Stories
Time For Love		#53	Oct. 1966	formerly Romantic Secrets
Time For Love	series 2	#1 – 47	Oct. 1967 – May 1976	
Timmy the Timid Ghost		#3 – 45	Feb. 1956 – Sept. 1966	
Timmy the Timid Ghost	series 2	#1 – 26	Oct. 1967 – Jan. 1986	
Tom Cat		#4 – 8	April 1956 – July 1957	becomes Atom the Cat
Top Cat		#1 – 20	Nov. 1970 – Nov. 1973	Based on the TV series
Top Eliminator		#25 – 29	Sept. 1967 – July 1968	formerly Teen-age Hotrodders, becomes Drag 'N' Wheels
Underdog		#1 – 10	July 1970 – Jan. 1972	Based on the TV series
Unusual Tales		#1 – 49	Nov. 1955 – March–April 1965	becomes Blue Beetle vol. 4
U.S. Air Force Comics		#1 – 37	Oct. 1958 – March–April 1965	becomes Army Attack
U.S. Marines		#1	Fall 1964	
Valley of the Dinosaurs		#1 – 11	April 1975 – Dec. 1976	Based on the TV series
Vengeance Squad		#1 – 6	July 1975 – May 1976	
War		#1 – 47	July 1975 – ? 1984	issues #41–47 all reprints
War and Attack		#1	Fall 1964	
War and Attack	series 2	#54 – 63	June 1966 – Dec. 1967	formerly Fightin' Air Force
War At Sea		#22 – 42	Nov. 1957 – June 1961	formerly Space Adventures
War Heroes		#1 – 27	Feb. 1963 – Nov. 1967	
Wheelie and the Chopper Bunch		#1 – 7	July 1975 – July 1976	Based on the TV series
Wild Bill Hickok		#68 – 75	Aug. 1958 – Dec. 1959	formerly Cowboy Western
Wild Frontier		#1 – 7	Oct. 1955 – April 1957	becomes Cheyenne Kid
Wild West		#58	Nov. 1966	formerly Black Fury
World of Wheels		#17 – 32	Oct. 1967 – June 1970	formerly Dragstrip Hotrodders
Wyatt Earp, Frontier Marshal		#11 – 72	Jan. 1956 – Dec. 1967	formerly Range Busters
Yang		#1 – 17	Nov. 1973 – Jan. 1986	issues #15–17 all reprints
Yellowjacket Comics		#1 – 10	Sept. 1944 – June 1946	becomes Jack in the Box
Yogi Bear		#1 – 35	Nov. 1970 – Jan. 1976	Based on the TV series
The Young Doctors		#1 – 6	Jan. 1963 – Nov. 1963	
Young Lovers		#16 – 18	July 1956 – May 1957	becomes My Secret Life
Zaza the Mystic		#10, 11	April 1956 – Sept. 1956	formerly Charlie Chan, becomes This Magazine Is Haunted vol. 2
Zoo Funnies		#1 – 15	Nov. 1945 – ? 1947	becomes Tim McCoy
