= Fightin' Navy =

Comic book

- Fightin' Navy #74 (Jan. 1956).

Publication information
- Publisher: Charlton Comics
- Schedule: Bi-monthly
- Format: Anthology
- Publication date: Jan. 1956 — May 1966; Aug. 1983 – Oct. 1984
- No. of issues: 60
- Editor(s): Al Fago (1956–1957); Pat Masulli (1957–1966)

Fightin' Navy is a bimonthly war comic that was published by Charlton Comics from 1956–1966, and then again from 1983–1984 (though it was then a reprint title). Telling fictional stories of the United States Navy, it was a sister title of the other Charlton war comics Fightin' Army, Fightin' Air Force, and Fightin' Marines.

Regular contributors to Fightin' Navy included penciler Bill Molno and inker Vince Alascia, both of whom worked on the book during nearly all of its run. Other notable contributors included the Charlton regulars Ken Battefield, Sam Glanzman, Joe Gill, Dick Giordano, Rocke Mastroserio, Charles Nicholas, and Tony Tallarico. Editor Pat Masulli helmed the book for most of its run.

== Publication history ==
As with many comic book titles published at the time, Fightin' Navy did not start with issue number one; it was a renaming of a series called Don Winslow of the Navy, which published four issues, numbered #70–73, from March–September 1955. The Don Winslow title originated with Fawcett Comics, which published 69 issues from 1943 to 1951.

The first issue of Fightin' Navy was #74, published in January 1956. Early issues sported the tagline "Exciting Sea Battle Stories".

The title ceased publication with issue #125, dated May 1966. Nearly twenty years later, in August 1983, Charlton briefly revived Fightin' Navy, publishing reprints from previous issues as well as the former Charlton titles Navy War Heroes and Submarine Attack, in issues #126–133. Finally, in October 1984, as the entire Charlton line ceased publishing, Fightin' Navy was cancelled. Altogether, the title published 60 issues.

== Features ==
Almost all of the stories in Fightin' Navy take place during World War II, telling tales of American ships battling the Japanese and the Germans.

== Notes ==
- Fightin' Navy at the Grand Comics Database
- Fightin' Navy at the Comic Book DB (archived from the original)
