= Fightin' Air Force =

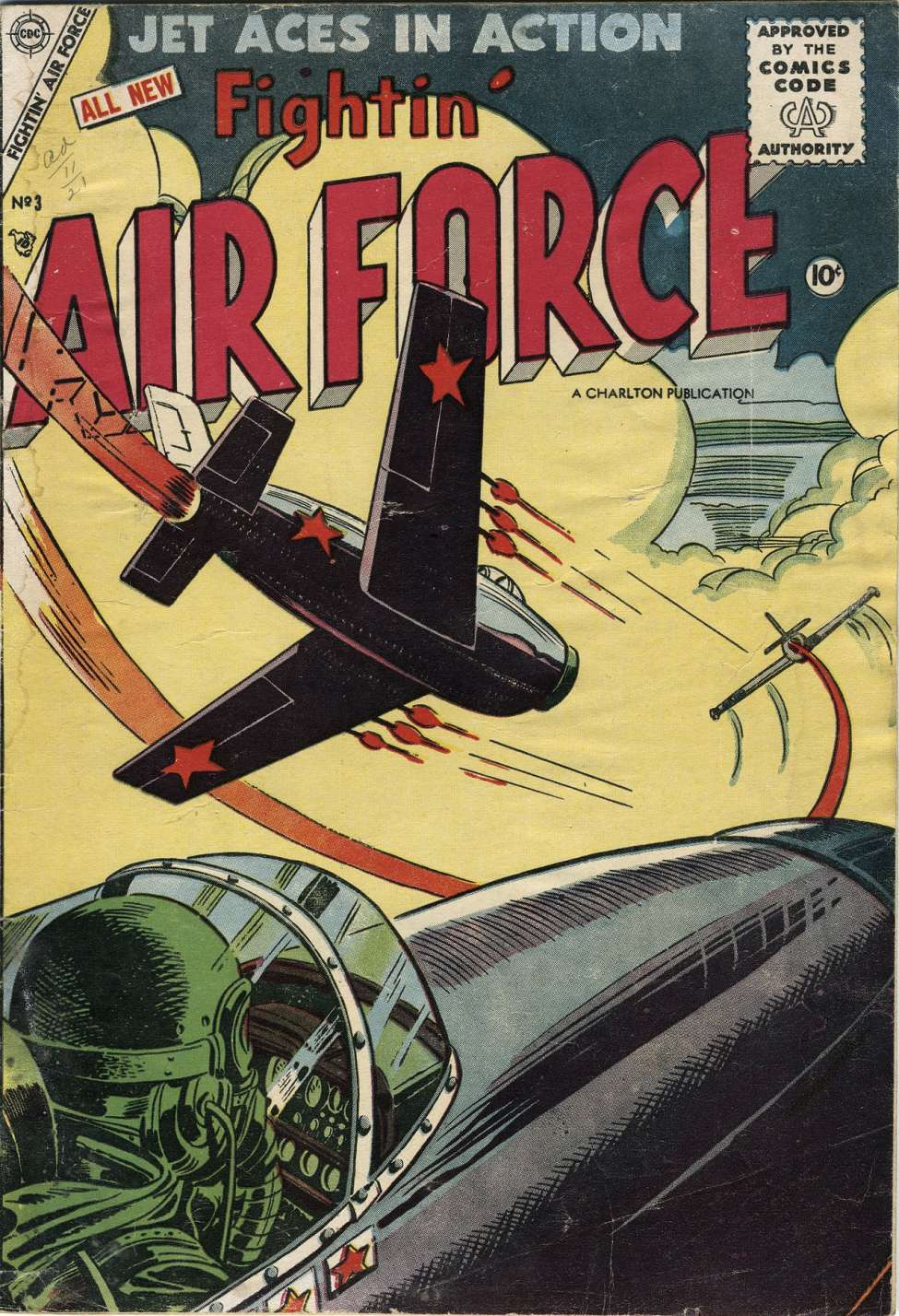
- Cover of Fightin' Air Force #3 (Feb. 1956).

Publication information
- Publisher: Charlton Comics
- Schedule: Bi-monthly
- Format: Anthology
- Publication date: Feb. 1956 – Feb./Mar. 1966
- No. of issues: 51

Fightin' Air Force is a bimonthly war comic that was published by Charlton Comics from 1956 to 1966. Telling fictional stories of American military pilots, it was a sister title of the other Charlton war comics Fightin' Army, Fightin' Marines, and Fightin' Navy.

Regular contributors to Fightin' Air Force included Dick Giordano (who illustrated many early covers), Sam Glanzman, Jack Keller, Rocke Mastroserio, Bill Molno, Charles Nicholas, Jack Abel, and inker Vince Alascia. Editor Pat Masulli helmed the book for most of its run.

== Publication history ==
As with many comic book titles published at the time, Fightin' Air Force did not start with issue number one; it was a renaming of a Charlton war comic called Never Again, which published two issues starting in August 1955.

The first issue of Fightin' Air Force was #3, published in February 1956. Early issues sported the tagline "Jet Aces in Action". Issue #12 (Oct. 1958) was a 100-page special. Fightin' Air Force ceased publication with issue #53, dated Feb./Mar. 1966. Altogether, the title published 51 issues.

Beginning in June 1966, Charlton created a new war title, War and Attack, which took over the numbering of Fightin' Air Force. War and Attack mostly featured infantry stories based during World War II; it published ten issues before it was cancelled with issue #63 (Dec. 1967).

== Features ==
Most of the stories in Fightin' Air Force take place during World War II, telling tales of American pilots battling the Japanese and the Germans. Despite the title of the comic, the United States Air Force wasn't formed as a separate branch of the military until 1947, after the conclusion of World War II; before that it was part of the United States Army. Some issues featured Korean War stories, and a few went back to World War I for material.

Regular text features told true stories of notable aircraft and famous aviation missions.

The title's last four issues (#50–53) hosted a recurring feature called "American Eagle", with art by Charles Nicholas and Vince Alascia. The Eagles — a trio of flyers named "Reb" Folsom, "Hotrock" Hutchins, and "Ugly" Harrison Clymes — battled Baron von Kesselein, the "Flaming Sabre of Hitler", and other World War II villains.
