= Will Franz =

American comic book writer

- Born: William Franz
- Areas: Writer, Penciller
- Notable works: "The Lonely War of Capt. Willy Schultz" "The Iron Corporal"

External image
- Franz in Brooklyn, New York City, in 2016. Archived from the original on June 1, 2020.

William Franz, who wrote as Will Franz, Willi Franz, and Willie Franz, is an American comic-book writer and occasional penciler, best known for his Charlton Comics war stories, mostly published from 1967 to 1970. Franz is particularly remembered for the ongoing feature "The Lonely War of Capt. Willy Schultz", a Vietnam War-era serial about a German American U.S. Army captain during World War II. The Willy Schultz storyline was a departure from most other combat features of this time, with its conflicted hero caught between loyalties.

== Biography ==
=== Early career ===
Franz broke into comics with the seven-page story "The Sniper" in Charlton Premiere #19 (cover-date July 1967), from the Derby, Connecticut-based Charlton Comics. There he would write and occasionally helped draw war-comics stories for such titles as Army War Heroes, D-Day, Fightin' Army, Marine War Heroes, and War Heroes. With artist Sam Glanzman, Franz co-created the feature "The Iron Corporal", starring a World War II American corporal fighting with the Australian Army in the Southwest Pacific, in a 10-page story in Army War Heroes #22 (Nov. 1967). It appeared in most subsequent issues through #37 (April 1970), with the script mostly credited to Willi Franz.

That same month, Franz and Glanzman co-created the Charlton feature "The Devil's Brigade". First appearing in War Heroes #27 (Nov. 1967), it also appeared in Fightin' Army #79, 82, and 83. The series revolved around commando troops in North Africa. According to Franz:

... (The Devil's Brigade) was an American tank crew joining up with a British tank crew, and they were roaming the North African desert. (I didn't even realize it at the time, I was using an advanced tank called The Centurion, which didn't come out until 1947, but I was younger and stupider then.) They were similar to the LRDG, the Long Range Desert Groups, which in reality, fought in trucks. But the series was just a shallow kind of series, just action-adventure. I never got anywhere strong with it, and I was kind of relieved when I got a call saying "We're dropping the War Heroes title, so we don't need 'The Devil's Brigade' anymore." Initially, they doubled-up "The Devil's Brigade" in Fightin' Army with "Willy Schultz."

==== "The Lonely War of Capt. Willy Schultz" ====
During this time Franz co-created, with artist Sam Glanzman, "The Lonely War of Capt. Willy Schultz". During combat in the European Theater, U.S. Army captain Schultz (a German American) is falsely accused and convicted of murder; he escapes and blends into the German Army while seeking a way to clear his name and retain his Allied allegiance. Franz opposed the American war in Vietnam, and his Willy Schultz stories, featuring a conflicted hero caught between loyalties, reflected the divisiveness of the era. Despite an initial inclination to kill Schultz at the end of the war, Franz instead had him go off with the daughter of a German general to start a new life.

"The Lonely War of Capt. Willy Schultz" debuted in Charlton's Fightin' Army #76 (Oct. 1967), and was serialized through issue #92 (July 1970). Selected stories were reprinted by Charlton many times thereafter. Following Charlton's dissolution in the 1980s, stories were collected by Avalon Communications/America's Comics Group in the 1999 miniseries The Lonely War of Willy Schultz #1–4 (May–Nov. 1999), with the script credit now reading Willie Franz. One was reprinted, along with an "Iron Corporal" story and Charlton war-comics stories by others, in the Avalon one-shot Star Combat Tales #1 (2000; no cover date).

Critic Mark Evanier observed

One fine (though brief) body of work emerged when a writer named Will Franz scripted ... a combat series called "The Lonely War of Capt. Willy Schultz." ... Sam Glanzman was his collaborator and what they produced was several cuts above Charlton's usual war material, and probably as good as any such tales ever produced anywhere. ... Mr. Franz didn't write many comics then. Truth to tell, I don't know much about him other than that he was responsible for a small number of gems. ... Of all [Glanzman]'s many projects, none is loved more than the work he did in tandem with Willy Franz.

In 1970, Franz left Charlton and, for the most part, the world of professional comics.

=== Later career ===
In 1972, Franz had one short piece, "Slave," published in the DC Comics anthology Weird War Tales #5 (May–June 1972).

In the 2000s, Franz re-teamed with "Willy Schultz" artist Glanzman on the Roman centurion series The Eagle, portions of which were published in the comics anthology Negative Burn.

In late 2007, Franz was ill and having difficulties paying his medical expenses. Franz's "Willy Schultz" collaborator Glanzman auctioned pages of original art from the series to help finance Franz's expenses. As of summer 2011, a recovered Franz was teaching writing and hosting event nights for Independence Care System, a nonprofit organization for Medicaid patients with long-term disabilities and other health issues.

On August 31, 2018 a Kickstarter campaign by It's Alive Comics to restore and complete "The Lonely War of Capt. Willy Schultz" in a hardcover compilation began, with a new final chapter written by Franz and drawn by Wayne Vansant. It was successfully funded on September 6, 2018. Complications in printing and the COVID-19 pandemic resulted in significant delays in the production. To finish the project, It's Alive Comics founder and solopreneur Drew Ford struck a deal to collaborate with Dark Horse Comics. In October 2022, Mr. Ford had tragically died from Coronavirus. Production continued with Dark Horse Comics while Glen Haumann of ComicMix and Dimitrios Fragiskatos of Anyone Comics in Brooklyn took over fulfillment of the crowdfunding campaign. The book was officially released online and in stores on January 11, 2023.

== Accolades ==
Charlton Comics' Fightin' Army #76 (Oct. 1967), introducing writer Will Franz and artist Sam Glanzman' feature "The Lonely War of Capt. Willy Schultz", is among the comics included in author and comics essayist Tony Isabella's 1,000 Comic Books You Must Read.
