= I Love You (comics) =

Romance comic (1955–1980)

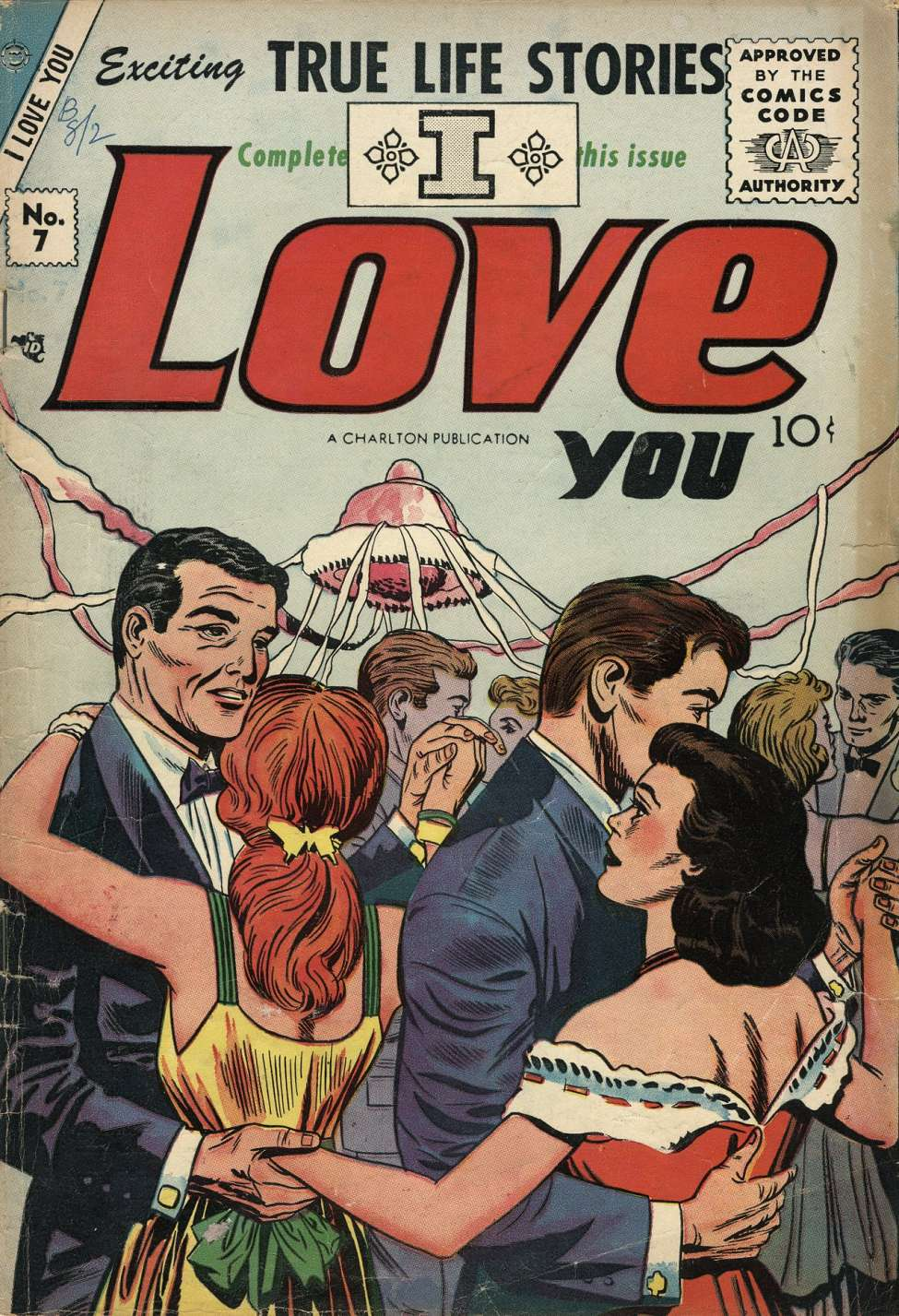
- Cover of I Love You #7, the first issue published by Charlton, pencils by Jack Kirby.

Publication information
- Publisher: Charlton Comics
- Schedule: Bimonthly
- Format: Anthology
- Genre: Romance
- Publication date: July 1955 – May 1980
- No. of issues: 124

Creative team
- Artist(s): Vince Colletta, Dick Giordano, Art Capello
- Penciller(s): Charles Nicholas, Norman Nodel, Joe Sinnott
- Inker(s): Vince Alascia, Vince Colletta
- Editor(s): Pat Masulli, Dick Giordano, Sal Gentile, George Wildman

I Love You is a romance comic that was published by Charlton Comics from 1955–1980.

Notable creators who worked on the title included inker Vince Alascia, who contributed to nearly every issue during its 25-year run. Joe Sinnott drew many early covers; most were inked by Vince Colletta, who worked on the title during the period 1959–1968. Dick Giordano illustrated a number of covers during this period as well. Charles Nicholas was a frequent contributor from 1959 to 1976. Norman Nodel illustrated for the title from 1966 – c. 1972. Art Capello drew for the title throughout the 1970s, including many covers.

== Publication history ==
As with many comic book titles published at the time, I Love You did not start with issue number one. Its first issue was #7, continuing the numbering of the Charlton romance title In Love, which published two issues in 1955. (Charlton had picked up In Love from the defunct Mainline Publications [operated by Jack Kirby and Joe Simon], which published the first four issues.) Early issues of I Love You sported the tagline "True Love Stories."

Charlton published 115 issues of I Love You from July 1955 – December 1976. After a nearly three-year hiatus, Charlton resumed the series with issue #122 in March 1979. I Love You ran for nine more issues – most of which were filled with reprints – finally ending for good with issue #130 in May 1980.

== Recurring features ==
Starting in the mid-1960s, I Love You featured rotating advice columns by Jeannette Copeland and Harold Gluck. Copeland's column was known as "Just Jeannette," while Gluck's were alternately titled "Canteen Corner" and "Teen-Age Troubles." In the mid-1970s, Jennifer White's "Jennifer's Corner" took over as the advice column.

In 1972–1973, the comic started featuring cameos by pop singers and actors such as Bobby Sherman, Susan Dey, Shirley Jones, and David Cassidy.

The last few issues featured a letter column edited by Buck Mason called "Buck's Bag."
