= Iron Corporal =

Fictional character

- First appearance of the Iron Corporal in Army War Heroes.

Publication information
- Publisher: Charlton Comics
- First appearance: Army War Heroes #22 (Nov. 1967)
- Created by: Willi Franz and Nicholas Alascia

In-story information
- Alter ego: Ian Heath
- Team affiliations: Australian Army
- Abilities: Iron ribcage appliance

The Iron Corporal is a fictional character appearing in comic books. He was first as a recurring character in Charlton Comics' war comics line, and briefly in his own comic book titled The Iron Corporal. His first appearance was in Army War Heroes #22 in 1967.

The stories, all written by Willi Franz and drawn by Sam Glanzman (except one story penciled and inked by Charles Nicholas and by Vince Alascia), revolved around Ian Heath, an American corporal fighting with the Australian Army in the Southwest Pacific during World War II. The Iron Corporal's back story includes having his ribs augmented with an iron-steel bracing manufactured by his steel industrialist father. The stories are only loosely connected and depict the struggles of infantrymen in war.

== Bibliography ==
- Army War Heroes #22–38 (Nov. 1967 – June 1970)
- Iron Corporal #23-25 (Oct. 1985 - Feb. 1986) — reprints of earlier stories
