= Captain Willy Schultz =

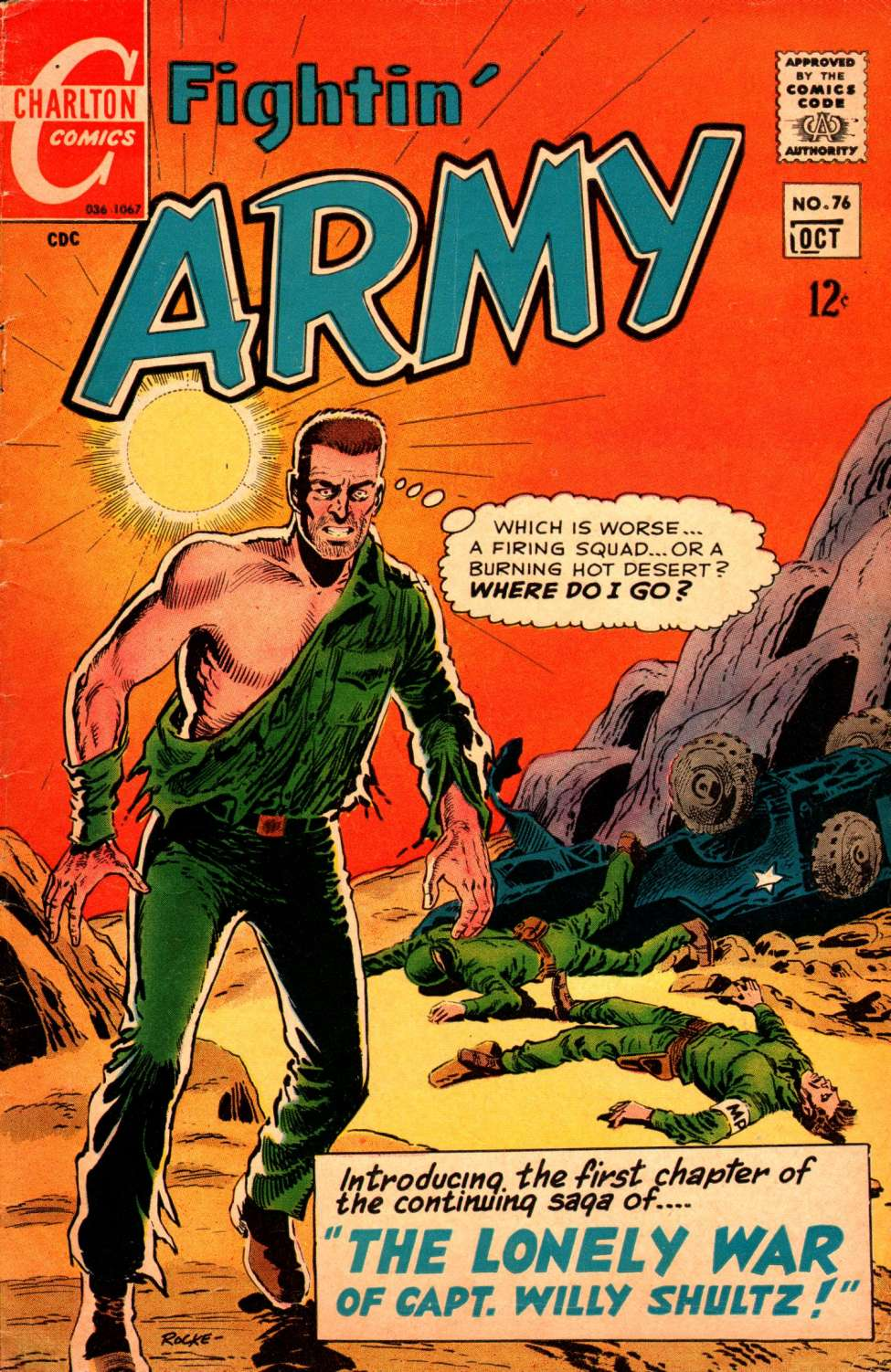
- Captain Willy Schultz on the cover of Fightin' Army #76 (Oct. 1967), art by Rocke Mastroserio. Note: There is a misspelling of "Schultz" on the cover.

Publication information
- Publisher: Charlton Comics
- First appearance: Fightin' Army #76 (Oct. 1967)
- Created by: Will Franz (writer); Sam Glanzman (artist)

In-story information
- Team affiliations: U.S. Army, German Army, British Army, Italian resistance movement, Office of Strategic Services

Captain Willy Schultz is a fictional comic-book soldier, a German-American U.S. Army captain during World War II, who after being falsely accused and convicted of murder, escapes and blends into the German Army while seeking a way to clear his name and retain his Allied allegiance. Created by writer Will Franz and artist Sam Glanzman, the character starred in the feature "The Lonely War of Capt. Willy Schultz", which debuted in Charlton Comics' Fightin' Army #76 (cover-dated Oct. 1967).

The Willy Schultz storyline was a departure from most other combat features of this time, with its conflicted hero caught between loyalties. Writer Franz opposed the American war in Vietnam, and the Schultz character reflected the divisiveness of the era.

== Publication history ==
Following the debut of his feature "The Lonely War of Capt. Willy Schultz" in the Charlton Comics war comics anthology Fightin' Army #76 (cover-dated Oct. 1967), Captain Willy Schultz continued in that series through issue #92 (July 1970), except in issue #81 (Sept. 1968).

The feature was reprinted in Fightin' Army #141 (Oct. 1979) and #150 (Mar. 1981), as well as in the Charlton series Attack #20 (Feb. 1980), Battlefield Action #68 (Apr. 1981), and Captain Willy Schultz #76-77 (Oct. 1985 - Jan. 1986).

In 1999 and 2000, Avalon Communications collected the feature in the four-issue series The Lonely War of Capt. Willy Schultz, and reprinted another Willy Schultz story in its one-shot Star Combat Tales #1 (Oct. 18, 2000).

== Fictional character biography ==
During the fighting in North Africa during World War II, Schultz, an armored company commander, is falsely accused of murdering his commanding officer, Lieutenant Colonel Charles Stenik. Arrested by Stenik's father, a U.S. Army general, Schultz is convicted of murder and sentenced to death.

Escaping from custody and in desperation, he joins a German Army Tiger unit, passing himself off as a German tank crewman separated from his unit. Using his language skills and knowledge of German military customs, Schultz goes through several adventures. He changes sides again, joining British commandos in a raid on a German base. He is captured by the Germans and sent to a prisoner of war camp in Italy. He escapes when the prison train is destroyed in a British air raid.

Schultz subsequently joins up with Office of Strategic Services Major Jon Daurio, who promises to get him a pardon if he agrees to work with Daurio's band of Italian partisans. Schultz became the sole survivor of his partisan unit, escaping to once again join the Germans and being sent to fight on the Eastern Front.

By 1945, he has become completely immersed in the German military and could no longer go home to the United States. The last story sees Schultz meeting Lassiter Wilkes (the U.S. officer who prosecuted Schultz for Stenik's murder) after the surrender of Schultz's German unit, and calling out, "I didn't kill him" — but without Schultz knowing if he spoke in English or in German.

Despite an initial inclination to kill Schultz at the end of the war, writer Franz instead had him go off with the daughter of a German general to start a new life.

== Accolades ==
Charlton Comics' Fightin' Army #76 (Oct. 1967), introducing writer Will Franz and artist Sam Glanzman's feature "The Lonely War of Capt. Willy Schultz", is among the comics included in author and comics essayist Tony Isabella's 1,000 Comic Books You Must Read.
