= Pat Masulli =

- Born: Patrick J. Masulli; July 31, 1930
- Died: June 10, 1998 (aged 67) Bethany, Connecticut
- Areas: Penciller, Editor, Colourist

Patrick J. Masulli (July 31, 1930 – June 10, 1998) was an American comic book creator. During the Silver Age of Comic Books, he was the executive editor of Charlton Comics from 1955–1966. Besides editing over thirty titles in ten years, Masulli co-created the Charlton characters Sarge Steel and the Son of Vulcan.

== Biography ==
Masulli attended the Cartoonists and Illustrators School as well as the Phonex School of Art. He entered the comics field in the mid-1940s, freelancing as a writer and artist for such companies as Fawcett Comics, Fox Comics, Hillman Periodicals, Holyoke Publications, Marvel Comics, St. John Publishing, Star Publications, Story Comics, Trojan Comics, Youthful Magazines, and Ziff-Davis Comics.

In 1950, he hooked up with the Derby, Connecticut-based Charlton, initially as a colorist. Although he soon became Charlton editor Al Fago's assistant, during this period Masulli occasionally contributed artwork to the publisher's titles, including covers and even penciling an entire issue of Atomic Rabbit.

Masulli became Charlton's executive editor when Fago left in 1955. Although the company was based in Connecticut, Masulli worked out of an office in Manhattan. In 1958, he hired Sam Glanzman as an artist; Glanzman was a mainstay at Charlton throughout the 1960s. From 1959–1960, Masulli's assistant editor was Dick Giordano.

When Giordano left in 1960 to pursue freelancing, Masulli hired artist Frank McLaughlin as his new assistant. "There were no art directors or assistant editors or any other job titles," McLaughlin said in a 2000 interview. "[I did e]verything from proofreading to art corrections, lettering titles for [editor] Ernie Hart's books, traffic managing, liaison with the Comics Code, and anything else, including cleaning the storeroom."

Some of the more notable titles Masulli edited included Atomic Mouse, Billy the Kid, Out of This World, Strange Suspense Stories, This Magazine Is Haunted, and Thunderbolt. He edited the Charlton war titles Fightin' Air Force, Fightin' Army, and Fightin' Navy from 1957–1966. He edited Ghostly Tales from 1966–1967, and was the original editor of Timmy the Timid Ghost vol. 2 (1967). Masulli co-created the character Sarge Steel in 1964, and with Bill Fraccio, created the Son of Vulcan in 1965. During this time he also frequently contributed artwork to Charlton's war and Western titles.

By the mid-1960s, Masulli was overburdened. Not only was he in charge of all of Charlton's magazines, including its profitable music division, but he was acting as both art director and managing editor for the comics line. He had very little interaction with Charlton's creators, other than in a disciplinary role. In 1966, the Charlton higher-ups decided Masulli needed to take more control of the music division, so they created a separate editorial position for the small comic book division. Giordano's prior experience as Masulli's assistant got him the job.

Masulli was executive editor of Charlton Publications from 1966–1969, and has no comic book credits after 1967.

He died on June 10, 1998, in Bethany, Connecticut, at the age of 67.
