= Mainline Publications =

Defunct American comic book publishing company

- Status: Defunct, 1956
- Founded: 1953
- Founder: Jack Kirby; Joe Simon
- Country of origin: United States
- Headquarters location: New York City
- Key people: Nevin Fidler
- Publication types: Comic books
- Fiction genres: Horror/suspense, Western, Romance

Mainline Publications, also called Mainline Comics, was a short-lived, 1950s American comic book publisher established and owned by Jack Kirby and Joe Simon.

== Foundation ==
With the 1950s backlash against comics, led by the psychiatrist Fredric Wertham, and propagated during the televised debates about comics leading to juvenile delinquency, as part of the Kefauver hearings, several publishing houses folded. This caused a problem for the printers. As Joe Simon detailed, "Comic book publishers were dropping out of the business in wholesale numbers. The printers grew frantic. It was a necessity of their business that the presses keep running. When the presses were silent, printing companies still had to pay overhead, so they were more than willing to back a new comics organization if it showed promise."

To serve as business manager for their Mainline Publications, Inc., they brought in Crestwood Publications office manager Nevin Fidler, who knew the mechanics of distributors and other necessary vendors, offering him a piece of the company. While keeping their hand in at Crestwood to fulfill their contract, Simon and Kirby invested their savings in their new company, working with veteran paper and printing broker George Dougherty, Jr. The two had long wanted to self-publish, and they further wished to create comics for the adults of the 1950s who had read comics as children in the 1940s.

As Simon recalled,

The distributor we chose was Leader News, the company that distributed Bill Gaines' EC Comics. As was the custom the distributor advanced the publisher 25 percent of the total income on a 100 percent sale. This advance was paid when the books were shipped from the printer to local wholesalers around the country. We assigned that money to the printer, who would then pay the engraver. ... Since a comic book would usually sell a minimum of 30 percent, everybody was happy. Mainline would be required to invest in only the editorial material, consisting of the art, lettering and scripts.

They set up shop in late 1953 or early 1954, subletting space from their friend Al Harvey's Harvey Publications at 1860 Broadway. Mainline published four titles: the Western Bullseye: Western Scout; the war comic Foxhole, since EC Comics and Atlas Comics were having success with war comics, but Mainline's was promoted as being "written and drawn by actual veterans"; In Love, as their earlier romance comic Young Love was still being widely imitated; and the crime comic Police Trap, which claimed to be based on genuine accounts by law-enforcement officials.

== Controversy ==
Despite Mainline's dissimilarity to the beleaguered EC and other companies then under constant attack, copies of Bullseye and Foxhole were reportedly used as exhibits by Wertham in the Senate hearings against comics, and seen by millions through the hearings' nationwide television coverage.

In an attempt to save on the cost of original artwork for a story in Crestwood's Young Love, Simon recycled an earlier Crestwood story by providing a new story and title to fit the existing art. This was spotted by a Crestwood employee, and legal advice taken over possible repercussions. Crestwood "took up the matter with their attorney [who] informed Crestwood that there was nothing in the contract that specified what kind of book we were obliged to turn in — as long as we turned in a book on schedule. That didn't satisfy the publishers, who naturally turned more hostile. They continued to hold off paying us while we grew increasingly desperate." In response, Simon and Kirby arranged in November 1954 to audit Crestwood, leading to a meeting between, on one side, Simon, Kirby, their accountant Bernard Gwirtzman and the attorney Gwirtzman chose, Morris Eisenstein; and on the other Crestwood publishers Teddy Epstein and Paul Bleier as well as general manager M. R. Reese.

Eisenstein demanded monies owed his clients by "Crestwood, Feature Publications, and Headline Publications, among others," entailing "advances, royalties, and other monies for Fighting American, Young Brides, Black Magic, Young Love, and Young Romance." Epstein countered that all monies had been paid, and no royalties withheld, so Gwirtzman clarified that the claimed funds derived largely from overseas sales, and that over the previous seven years the total was around $130,000. Crestwood's attorney responded that the company could not pay that much, and, were it to go to court, "would simply close down." Offered a $10,000 settlement and the recently delayed payments, Simon and Kirby returned to working on Mainline, but under increasingly strained circumstances. Even the Simon/Kirby relationship was now fraught, the two "barely [speaking] while working in the same room."

== Collapse ==
With the continuing attacks by Wertham, Senator Estes Kefauver, and others, publishers continued to fold "and the number of comics published dropped from 650 to 250." Carmine Infantino, a friend of Kirby's who worked for National Comics, the future DC Comics, recalled that National publisher Jack Liebowitz, Atlas Comics publisher Martin Goodman, "and the people from Archie [MLJ Comics], got together and created the Comics Code, which promised parents they would have no more blood and stuff like that." The advent of the Code effectively gutted EC Comics and threatened the comics industry generally. Distributor Leader News "no longer had enough money to advance to small companies like Mainline", and with its implosion brought about the end of Simon and Kirby's company in late 1956.

The unpublished materials for Mainline's titles were sold to Charlton Comics, which published them and, in some cases, continued the titles under new names. With the demise of Mainline, the longstanding partnership between Simon and Kirby also ended, although they would collaborate on a few more comics. Simon left comics for a time to take up a role in advertising, and Kirby returned to National Comics, taking with him, with Simon's blessing, "the final project of the Simon & Kirby team", Challengers of the Unknown, co-created with writers Dick and Dave Wood. The non-superpowered adventuring quartet appeared in National's Showcase #6 (Feb. 1957) and eventually in its own series.

== Titles ==
Mainline published four titles:

- Bullseye: Western Scout (Western), #1-5. Charlton Comics published #6-7
- Foxhole (war), #1-4. Charlton Comics published #5-7
- In Love (romance), #1-4. Charlton Comics published #5-6, then renamed it I Love You
- Police Trap (crime), #1-4. Charlton Comics published #5-6
