= Sam Glanzman =

American comic artist (1924–2017)

- Born: Samuel Joseph Glanzman; December 5, 1924 Baltimore, Maryland, U.S.
- Died: July 12, 2017 (aged 92) Maryland, New York, U.S.
- Area: Artist
- Notable works: Hercules "The Lonely War of Willy Schultz" "U.S.S. Stevens"; A Sailor's Story
- Awards: Inkpot Award (1999)

Samuel Joseph Glanzman (December 5, 1924 – July 12, 2017) was an American comics artist and memoirist. Glanzman is best known for his Charlton Comics series Hercules, about the mythological Greek demigod; his autobiographical war stories about his service aboard the USS Stevens for DC Comics and Marvel Comics; and the Charlton Comics Fightin' Army feature "The Lonely War of Willy Schultz", a Vietnam War-era serial about a German-American U.S. Army captain during World War II.

== Biography ==
=== Early life and career ===
Glanzman was born on December 5, 1924, in Baltimore, Maryland, the son of Florence and Gustave Glanzman. His father was Jewish and his mother Catholic. His brothers were comic-book artists D.C. (Davis Charles) Glanzman and Louis "Lew" Glanzman, the latter of whom went on to become a fine art painter.

Glanzman ended his formal education after grade school. He entered the comics industry in late 1939, during the period historians and fans call the Golden Age of comic books, at Funnies, Inc., one of the early "packagers" that supplied comics to publishers then entering the fledgling medium. There, for Centaur Publications, he wrote two-page text stories with incidental art for Amazing-Man Comics. Later, for Harvey Comics, he created Fly-Man in the superhero anthology Spitfire Comics #1 (August 1941), writing and drawing the feature for at least two issues. He also contributed to Harvey's All-New Short Story Comics (where he published his first recorded war story); Champ Comics (stories about the superhero Human Meteor); and the radio program tie-in series Green Hornet Comics through 1943.

He served in the U.S. Navy, during World War II, stationed on the destroyer USS Stevens, and was discharged in 1946. Eschewing work in comics ("I was getting $7.50 a page for [Fly-Man], pencils, inks, story, and coloring ... I figured, 'Hell, that's not much money.'"), he began a peripatetic career doing manual labor in cabinet shops, lumber mills, and boat yards. After marrying in the 1950s, he worked at Republic Aviation in Farmingdale, New York, installing machine guns on military jets. During this time, he lived in Rockaway, Queens, and in the Long Island towns of Valley Stream and Massapequa Park.

Seeking to return to art, Glanzman did some work for the Eastern Color series Heroic Comics and New Heroic Comics in 1950, and found better-paying assignments doing children's book illustration. He may have done uncredited work for his brother Lew on a hardcover book series for children about aircraft. Work was not steady, however, and Glanzman returned to Republic Aviation.

=== Charlton Comics ===
Glanzman's cover of Hercules #11 (May 1969), unusually stylized for the time and medium.

In 1958, Glanzman began working with Pat Masulli, the executive editor of Charlton Comics, a low-paying publishing company. He specialized in stories for the war titles Attack, Battlefield Action, Fightin' Air Force, Fightin' Marines, Submarine Attack, U.S. Air Force Comics, and War at Sea, producing a large amount of authentically detailed work. In mid-1961 he switched to Dell Comics. where he worked on the anthology Combat, drew the movie adaptation Voyage to the Bottom of the Sea and the similar, though unrelated, four-issue Voyage to the Deep, and a range of titles from lost-world adventure (Kona, Monarch of Monster Isle) to heartwarming animal drama (Lad: A Dog). He occasionally still moonlighted for Charlton, using the initials "SJG" for his work on the 1962 Marco Polo movie adaptation and elsewhere.

Beginning mid-1964, Glanzman moved regularly between Charlton and Dell assignments, almost exclusively on war stories, but also on a Charlton Tarzan series. Although some sources credit him for co-creating the Charlton hardboiled detective character Sarge Steel, he stated in a 2009 interview that "The only thing I created was the "U.S.S. Stevens", "Attu" and A Sailor's Story."

During the 1960s Glanzman and writer Gill created the Charlton mythological-adventure series Hercules: Adventures of the Man-God, which would run 13 issues (Oct. 1967 - Sept. 1969), and showcased Glanzman's experimental side, where he might float Art Nouveau-bordered panels within action tableaux filled with Hieronymous Boschian nightmares.

Also during this time he co-created, with writer Will Franz, "The Lonely War of Willy Schultz", a departure from most other World War II features of this time, with a conflicted American soldier of German heritage caught between loyalties. During combat in the European Theater, U.S. Army captain Schultz is falsely accused and convicted of murder; he escapes and blends into the German Army while seeking a way to clear his name and retain his Allied allegiance. The feature, reprinted as late as 1999, was serialized in Charlton's Fightin' Army #76–80, 82–92 (Oct. 1967 – July 1968 and Nov. 1968 – July 1970).

Glanzman freelanced for Outdoor Life magazine in the 1960s as well.

=== DC Comics ===
War comics editor-artist Joe Kubert of industry giant DC Comics brought Glanzman to work on Our Army at War, Star Spangled War Stories, Weird War Tales, and other combat titles including G.I. Combat, where for years he illustrated the feature "Haunted Tank". At DC, Glanzman began his series of autobiographical war stories about his service aboard the U.S.S. Stevens in Our Army at War #218 (April 1970). Glanzman would also occasionally draw stories for DC's supernatural-mystery anthologies. He was one of the contributors to the debut issues of Ghosts and Blitzkrieg. By late 1979, with most of DC's war titles either canceled or converted to character series with established teams, Glanzman remained solely on G.I. Combat and began freelancing again for Charlton. Following his last "Haunted Tank" story, in G.I. Combat #288 (March 1987), Glanzman drew two more stories for DC a year later, in Sgt. Rock #420–421 (Feb.–April 1988). He would return to ink penciler Tim Truman on the Western miniseries Jonah Hex: Two Gun Mojo (Sept.–Dec. 1993), Jonah Hex: Riders of the Worm and Such (March–July 1995), and Jonah Hex: Shadows West (Feb.–April 1999) all written by Joe R. Lansdale.

=== Later career ===
A Sailor's Story / Marvel Graphic Novel #30 (March 1987). Cover art by Glanzman

Glanzman also contributed a handful of war stories to Marvel Comics from 1986 to 1989, in the black-and-white adventure magazine Savage Tales, the Marine Corps series Semper Fi, an issue of The 'Nam, and most notably A Sailor's Story / Marvel Graphic Novel #30 (March 1987), a 60-page true account, which he both wrote and drew, of his time on USS Stevens during World War II. Unusually for Marvel's graphic novel line, it was released in hardcover rather than as a trade paperback. A trade paperback edition followed, together with a sequel, A Sailor's Story, Book Two: Winds, Dreams, and Dragons, which continued the story up to the end of the war.

Other work in the 1990s included inking some issues of Turok Dinosaur Hunter for Acclaim Comics and Zorro for Topps Comics, and writing and drawing a serialized feature in Flashback Comics' Fantastic Worlds #1. His later work includes stories in two anthologies: writing and drawing the 10-page, true-life story "On the Job: Cooks Tour," in the graphic-story trade paperback Streetwise (TwoMorrows Publishing, 2000, ISBN 1-893905-04-7), and the donated, four-page "There Were Tears in Her Eyes," in the squarebound benefit comic 9-11: The World's Finest Comic Book Writers & Artists Tell Stories to Remember, Volume Two (2002).

From 1999 to 2001, the Avalon Communications imprint America's Comic Group / ACG (not to be confused with American Comics Group / AGC) reprinted large amounts of Glanzman's Charlton Comics work in a number of mostly one-shot titles, including Hercules, Flyboys, Nam Tales, Star Combat Tales, Total War, and ACG Comics Presents Fire and Steel.

In 2003, Glanzman began working on webcomics, writing and drawing the 19th-century nautical adventure Apple Jack, and reteaming with his "Willy Schultz" writer, Will Franz, on the Roman centurion series The Eagle. In 2012 and 2013, new "U.S.S. Stevens" stories by Glanzman appeared in the Joe Kubert Presents six-issue anthology limited series. In 2015, Glanzman's "U.S.S. Stevens" stories and the A Sailor's Story graphic novels were collected by Dover Publications.

Glanzman died on July 12, 2017, in Maryland, New York, under hospice care after falling and undergoing surgery.

== Awards ==
Sam Glanzman received the Inkpot Award in 1999 and posthumously received the Bill Finger Award for Excellence in Comic Book Writing in 2023.

== Bibliography ==
Glanzman's U.S.S. Stevens stories for DC Comics appear in:

- Our Army at War #220, 223, 225, 227, 230–232, 235 238, 240–242, 244–245, 247–248, 256–259, 261–262, 265–267, 275, 281–282, 284, 293, 298 (1970–1976)
- Our Fighting Forces 128, 132, 134, 136, 138–139, 140–141, 143 (1970–1972)
- Weird War Tales #4 (1972)
- G.I. Combat #152 (1972)
- Star Spangled War Stories #167, 171, 174 (1973)
- Sgt. Rock #304, 308 (1977)
- Sgt. Rock Special #1 (1992)
- Joe Kubert Presents #1–6 (2012–2013)

Preceded by Doug Wildey	"Haunted Tank" feature in G.I. Combat artist 1972–1987	Succeeded by n/a
Preceded by Randy Elliott	Turok inker 1994	Succeeded by Randy Elliott
