= Charlton Comics =

Defunct American comic books publisher

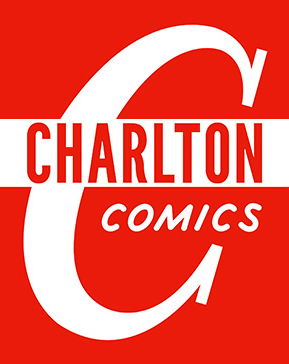
- "Big C" logo, used from September 1967 to September 1973
- Industry: Comics
- Founded: 1944; 82 years ago as The Frank Comunale Publishing Company
- Founder: John Santangelo Sr.; Ed Levy
- Defunct: 1986; 40 years ago
- Fate: Library absorbed by DC Comics, including the Fawcett Comics characters that were purchased by Charlton Comics.
- Successor: DC Comics
- Headquarters: Derby, Connecticut
- Key people: Al Fago; Pat Masulli; George Wildman
- Owner: Charlton Publications
- Divisions: Frank Comunale Publications; Children Comics Publishing; Frank Publications; Modern Comics

Charlton Comics was an American comic-book publishing company that existed from 1945 to 1986, having begun under a different name: T. W. O. Charles Company, in 1940. It was based in Derby, Connecticut. The comic-book line was a division of Charlton Publications, which published magazines (most notably song-lyric magazines), puzzle books, and briefly, books, under the imprints Monarch and Gold Star. It had its own distribution company, Capital Distribution.

Charlton Comics published a wide variety of genres, including crime, science fiction, Western, horror, war, and romance comics, as well as talking animal and superhero titles. The company was known for its low-budget practices, often using unpublished material acquired from defunct companies and paying comics creators among the lowest rates in the industry. Charlton was also the last of the American comics publishers still operating to raise its cover prices from 10 to 12 cents in 1962.

It was unique among comic-book companies in that it controlled all areas of publishing – from editorial to printing to distribution – rather than working with outside printers and distributors, as did most other publishers. It did so under one roof at its Derby headquarters.

The company was formed by John Santangelo Sr. and Ed Levy in 1940 as T. W. O. Charles Company, named after the co-founders' two sons, both named Charles, and became Charlton Publications in 1945.

== History ==
=== Early years ===
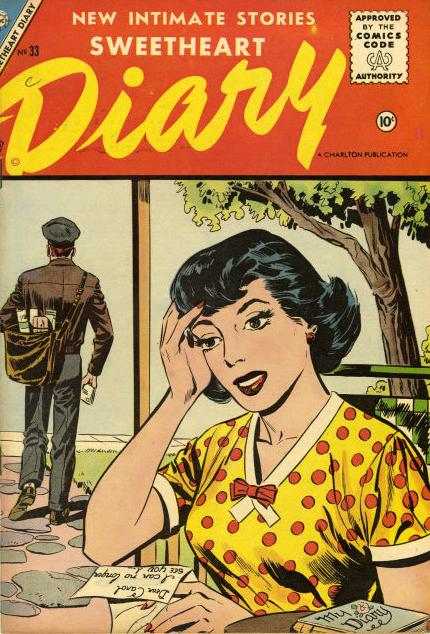
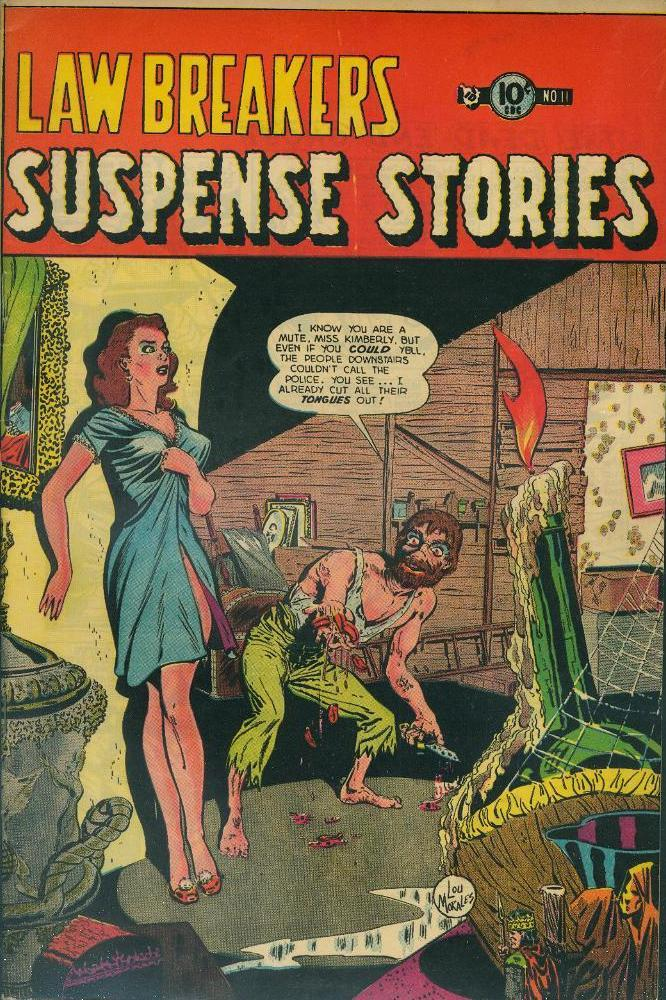
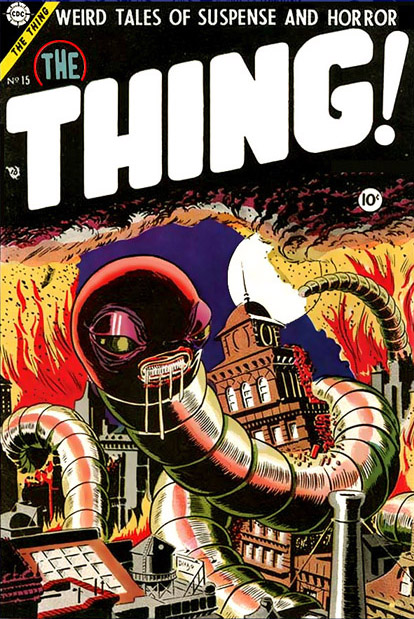
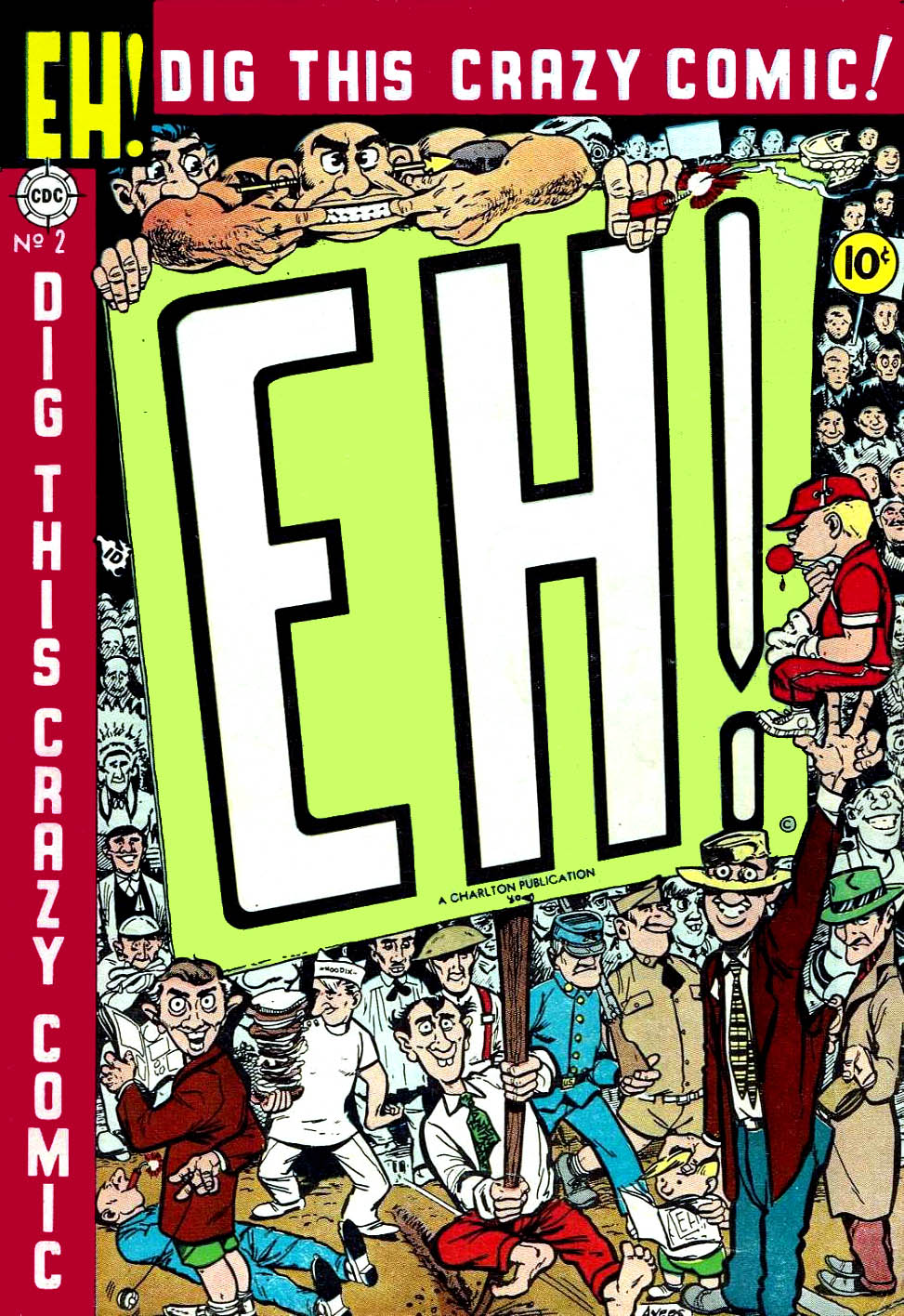
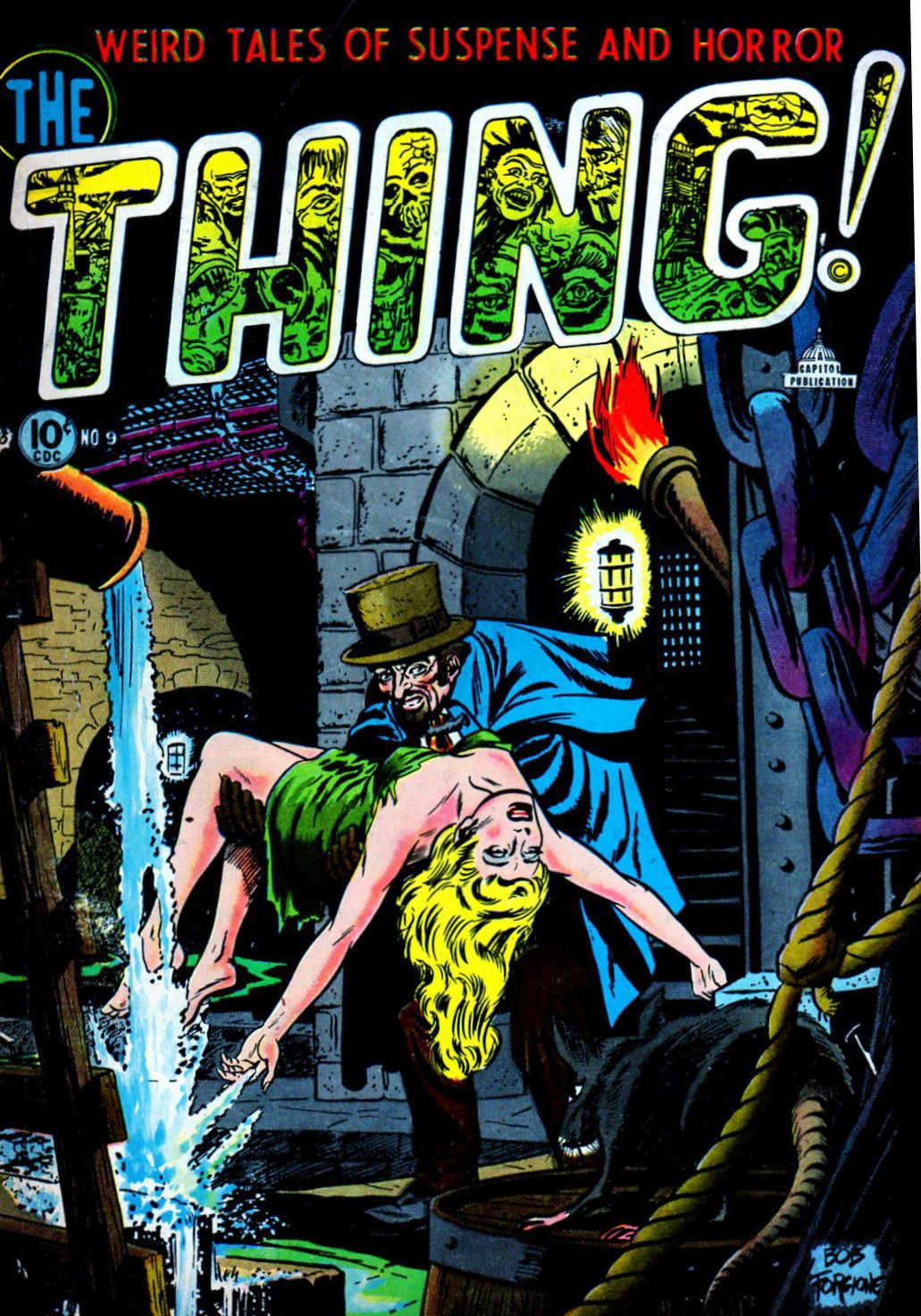
Charlton published a wide variety of genres, including romance, crime, satire and horror.

In 1931, Italian immigrant John Santangelo Sr., a bricklayer who had started a construction business in White Plains, New York, five years earlier, began what became a highly successful business publishing song-lyric magazines out of nearby Yonkers, New York. Operating in violation of copyright laws, however, he was sentenced in 1934 to a year and a day at New Haven County Jail in New Haven, Connecticut, near Derby, where his wife and he by then lived. In jail, he met Waterbury, Connecticut attorney Ed Levy, with whom he began legitimate publishing in 1935, acquiring permissions to reproduce lyrics in such magazines as Hit Parader and Big Song Magazine. Santangelo and Levy opened a printing plant in Waterbury the following year, and in 1940, founded the T.W.O. Charles Company, eventually moving its headquarters to Derby. Charlton purchased the company Song Lyrics, Inc., which published Song Hits magazine and was owned by Lyle Engel in 1949.

Following the adoption of the Charlton Comics name in 1946, the company over the next five years acquired material from freelance editor and comics packager Al Fago (brother of former Timely Comics editor Vincent Fago). Charlton additionally published Merry Comics, Cowboy Western, the Western title Tim McCoy, and Pictorial Love Stories.

The company used a second-hand press originally used for printing cereal boxes. These large presses were very costly to both stop and start, which only happened twice a year when they had to be cleaned; as such, they started publishing comics as a mean to keep the presses going. After the entry into the comic business, the company's first comic book was Yellowjacket, an anthology of superhero and horror stories launched September 1944 under the imprint Frank Comunale Publications, with Ed Levy listed as publisher. Zoo Funnies was published under the imprint Children Comics Publishing; Jack in the Box, under Frank Comunale; and TNT Comics, under Charles Publishing Co. Another imprint was Frank Publications.

In 1951, when Al Fago began as an in-house editor, Charlton hired a staff of artists who included its future managing editor, Dick Giordano. Others (staff or freelance) who eventually worked with Charlton included Vince Alascia, Jon D'Agostino, Sam Glanzman, Rocco "Rocke" Mastroserio, Bill Molno, Charles Nicholas, and Sal Trapani. The primary writer was the remarkably prolific Joe Gill. The same year the company created an in-house comics department, where comics would make up 25% of Charlton.

The company began a wide expansion of its comics line, which included notoriously gory horror comics (the principal title being Steve Ditko's The Thing!). In 1954–55, it acquired a stable of comic-book properties from the defunct Superior Comics, Mainline Publications, St. John Publications, and most significantly, Fawcett Publications, which was shutting down its Fawcett Comics division. Charlton continued publishing two of Fawcett's horror books—This Magazine Is Haunted and Strange Suspense Stories—initially using unpublished material from Fawcett's inventory. Artistic chores were then handed to Ditko, whose moody, individualistic touch came to dominate Charlton's supernatural line. Beset by the circulation slump that swept the industry towards the end of the 1950s, Haunted struggled for another two years, published bimonthly until May 1958. Strange Suspense Stories ran longer, lasting well into the 1960s before "giving up the ghost" in 1965.

Charlton published a wide line of romance titles, particularly after it acquired the Fawcett line, which included the romance comics Sweethearts, Romantic Secrets, and Romantic Story. Sweethearts was the comic world's first monthly romance title (debuting in 1948), and Charlton continued publishing it until 1973. Charlton had launched its first original romance title in 1951, True Life Secrets, but that series only lasted until 1956. Charlton also picked up a number of Western titles from the defunct Fawcett Comics line, including Gabby Hayes Western, Lash LaRue Western, Monte Hale Western, Rocky Lane Western, Six-Gun Heroes, Tex Ritter Western, Tom Mix Western, and Western Hero.

Seeking to save money on second-class postage permits, Charlton, like many comic-book publishers of the era, frequently changed the titles of their comics, rather than start new ones at number 1 (a new publication required a new postal permit, while an existing publication that just changed its name could use its existing permit). Notable examples of this practice include the titles Billy the Kid (originally Masked Raider), Blue Beetle vol. 2 (originally The Thing!), Blue Beetle vol. 3 (originally Unusual Tales), Fightin' Air Force (originally Never Again), Fightin' Army (originally Soldier and Marine Comics), Fightin' Marines (originally The Texan), Fightin' Navy (originally Don Winslow of the Navy), Ghostly Haunts (originally Ghost Manor), Ghostly Tales (originally Blue Beetle vol. 3), I Love You (originally In Love), and Sweethearts (originally Fawcett's Captain Midnight).

Al Fago left in the mid-1950s, and was succeeded by his assistant, Pat Masulli, who remained in the position for 10 years. Masulli oversaw a plethora of new romance titles, including the long-running I Love You, Sweetheart Diary, Brides in Love, My Secret Life, and Just Married; and the teen-oriented romance comics Teen-Age Love, Teen Confessions, and Teen-Age Confidential Confessions.

On August 19, 1955, the company was hit hard by a flood (see 1955 Connecticut floods). The water was rising so fast that vital office records was all that could be saved. $300,000 in paper inventory, plates, mats and original comics artwork were lost, including the artwork the company had bought from Fawcett Comics, in addition to printing presses and typesetting machines. Several issues of comics were destroyed, and some titles abandoned completely. Due to the shutdown following the flood, the comics were outsourced to outside presses for some months.

Superheroes were a minor part of the company. At the beginning, Charlton's main characters were Yellowjacket, not to be confused with the later Marvel character, and Diana the Huntress. In the mid-1950s, Charlton briefly published a Blue Beetle title with new and reprinted stories, and in 1956, several short-lived titles written by Superman co-creator Jerry Siegel, such as Mr. Muscles, Zaza the Mystic, and Nature Boy (the latter with artist Mastroserio).

=== Silver Age ===
The company's most noteworthy period was during the "silver age" of comic books, which had begun with DC Comics' successful revival of superheroes in 1956. In March 1960, Charlton's science-fiction anthology title Space Adventures introduced Captain Atom, by Gill and the future co-creator of Marvel Comics' Spider-Man, Steve Ditko. (After the mid-1980s demise of Charlton, Captain Atom went on to become a stalwart of the DC stable, as would Blue Beetle, the old Fox Comics superhero revived by Gill and artists Bill Fraccio and Tony Tallarico as a campy, comedic character in Blue Beetle #1 [June 1964].)

Charlton also had moderate success with Son of Vulcan, its answer to Marvel's Thor, in Mysteries of Unexplored Worlds #46 (May 1965).

During the Silver Age, Charlton, like Marvel and DC, published war comics. Notable titles included the "Fightin'" line of Fightin' Air Force, Fightin' Army, Fightin' Marines, and Fightin' Navy; the "Attack" line of Army Attack and Submarine Attack; Battlefield Action; D-Day, U.S. Air Force Comics, and War Heroes. Though primarily anthologies of stories about 20th-century warfare, they included a small number of recurring characters and features, including "The American Eagle", "Shotgun Harker and the Chicken", "The Devil's Brigade", "The Iron Corporal", and "The Lonely War of Capt. Willy Schultz". Army War Heroes and Marine War Heroes depicted stories based on actual Medal of Honor recipients. Space War, first created in 1959 became Fightin' 5 in 1964.

With the mid-1960s fad for James Bond secret agents such as Nick Fury, Agent of S.H.I.E.L.D., Charlton turned their Vietnam veteran turned hardboiled detective, Sarge Steel, into a special agent after the sixth issue, later renaming the comic Secret Agent.

Charlton threw itself into the resurgent horror comics genre during this period with such titles as Ghostly Tales, The Many Ghosts of Doctor Graves, and Ghost Manor. It also created a pair of identical horror-movie magazines: Horror Monsters (1961–1964) and Mad Monsters (1961–1965). Additionally, Charlton produced comics based on monsters featured in motion pictures such as Konga, Gorgo and Reptilicus.

Charlton continued its commitment to romance comics with such new titles as Career Girl Romances, Hollywood Romances (later to change its name to For Lovers Only), and Time for Love.

In 1965, Charlton revived the Captain Atom character in Strange Suspense Stories numbers 75, 76, and 77, reprinting the Steve Ditko-illustrated stories that had originally appeared in Space Adventures in the early 1960s. Retitling the comic, Captain Atom Volume 2 #78 (cover dated Dec. 1965), Charlton began publishing newly created stories by Ditko of the superhero. In 1967, Ditko stopped working at Marvel and returned to Charlton full-time. After his celebrated stint at Marvel, he had grown disenchanted with that company and his Spider-Man collaborator, writer-editor Stan Lee. Having the hugely popular Ditko back helped prompt Charlton editor Giordano to introduce the company's "Action Hero" superhero line, with characters including Captain Atom, Ditko's the Question, Gill and artist Pat Boyette's The Peacemaker, Gill and company art director Frank McLaughlin's Judomaster, Pete Morisi's Peter Cannon... Thunderbolt, and Ditko's new "Ted Kord" version of the Blue Beetle. Because Giordano had a personal dislike for superheroes and wanted to keep them in a pulplike realm of relative believability, all the characters in his Action Hero line, except for Captain Atom, were ordinary humans which used their skills and talents instead of superpowers. The company also developed a reputation as a place for new talent to break into comics; examples include Jim Aparo, Dennis O'Neil and Sam Grainger. As well, Charlton in the late 1960s published some of the first manga in America, in Ghost Manor and other titles (thanks to artist Sanho Kim), and artist Wayne Howard became the industry's first known cover-credited series creator, with the horror-anthology Midnight Tales blurbing "Created by Wayne Howard" on each issue—"a declaration perhaps unique in the industry at the time".

Yet by the end of 1967, Charlton's superhero titles had been cancelled, and licensed properties had become the company's staples, particularly cartoon characters from Hanna-Barbera (The Flintstones, The Jetsons, Top Cat, Korg: 70,000 B.C., others). Charlton took over publication of a number of King Features Syndicate characters from that company's short-lived King Comics, including Beetle Bailey, Blondie Comics, Flash Gordon, Jungle Jim, The Phantom, and Popeye. Charlton also published Bullwinkle and Rocky, and Hoppity Hooper, based on Jay Ward Productions' Hoppity Hooper, and Rocky and His Friends/The Bullwinkle Show.

Charlton dabbled occasionally in adaptations of live-action TV comedies. The most successful was My Little Margie, based on the 1952-55 network series starring Gale Storm; the Charlton version ran for a full 10 years (1954–64, 54 issues) and inspired two spinoffs, My Little Margie's Boy Friends (1955–58, 11 issues) and My Little Margie's Fashions (1959, five issues). Abbott and Costello, debuting in 1968, was based on the syndicated Abbott and Costello animated cartoon series of 1967-68 and ran for 22 issues. Hee Haw, a remarkably faithful rendition of the then-current CBS-TV series, bowed in 1970 but ran for only seven issues. Both the Abbott and Costello and Hee Haw comics were discontinued in the summer of 1971, although Charlton's Hee Haw was revamped for general audiences as a 50-cent magazine, printed in black-and-white with cast photos and jokes supplemented by advertising. The last of the comedy vehicles was The Partridge Family, based on the then-current ABC-TV sitcom; launched in 1971, the comic book ran for 21 issues until it was cancelled in 1973.

=== Bronze Age ===
Nicola Cuti made creative improvements to Charlton's line in the early 1970s, which had been referred to as comics' Bronze Age, during which he worked as assistant editor under George Wildman, who was occupied primarily with administrative duties. Cuti brought Mike Zeck, among others, into Charlton's roster of artists, and his writing enlivened the Ghostly titles, now including Ghostly Haunts. Other Bronze Age Charlton horror titles included Haunted, Midnight Tales, and Scary Tales.

In 1973, Charlton debuted the gothic romance title Haunted Love, but this same period saw the mass cancellation of almost all of Charlton's vast stable of traditional romance titles, including such long-running series as; Sweethearts, Romantic Secrets, Romantic Story, I Love You, Teen-Age Love, Just Married, and Teen Confessions, all of which dated from the 1950s.

Bullseye logo, used from Sept./Oct. 1973

In the mid-1970s, a brief resurgence of talent occurred, energized by Cuti, artist Joe Staton, and the "CPL Gang" – a group of writer/artist comics fans including John Byrne, Roger Stern, Bob Layton, and Roger Slifer, who had all worked on the fanzine Contemporary Pictorial Literature. Charlton began publishing such new titles as E-Man, Midnight Tales, and Doomsday + 1. The CPL Gang also produced an in-house fanzine called Charlton Bullseye, which published, among other things, commissioned but previously unpublished material; including the company's last Captain Atom story. Also during this period, most of Charlton's titles began sporting painted covers.

Early in 1975, Cuti, already writing freelance for the company in addition to his staff duties, quit to write freelance exclusively for Charlton when its line expanded to include black-and-white magazines in addition to the King Features and Hanna-Barbera franchised titles. He was replaced by Bill Pearson, who became assistant editor after promoting Don Newton as the new Phantom artist and writing scripts for that title.

Charlton's black-and-white comics magazines were based upon current television series and aimed at older readers. One of these was The Six Million Dollar Man #1–7 (July 1976 – August 1977). Retailing for $1, it featured art by Neal Adams' studio, Continuity Associates, as well as some stories by veteran illustrators Jack Sparling and Win Mortimer. Also published in magazine form were adaptations of The Six Million Dollar Man spinoff The Bionic Woman, Space: 1999, and Emergency!, as well as a comic based on teen heartthrob David Cassidy, then starring in the musical sitcom The Partridge Family.

By 1976, however, most of these titles had been cancelled, and most of the company's remaining titles went on hiatus during the period January to August 1977. Much of the new talent took the opportunity to move on to Marvel and DC.

=== Final years ===
By the 1980s, Charlton was in decline. The comic-book industry was in a sales slump, struggling to reinvent a profitable distribution and retail system. Charlton's licensed titles lapsed, its aging presses were deteriorating towards uselessness, and the company did not have the resources to replace them. In 1981, yet another attempt was made at new material, with a comic-book version of Charlton Bullseye serving as a new-talent showcase that actively solicited submissions by comic-book fans, and an attempt at new Ditko-produced titles. A number of 1970s-era titles were also reprinted under the Modern Comics imprint and sold in bagged sets in department stores (in much the same way Gold Key Comics were published under the Whitman Comics moniker around the same time). None of these measures worked, and in 1984, Charlton Comics suspended publication.

In 1985, a final attempt at a revival was spearheaded by new editor T. C. Ford with a direct-to-market Charlton Bullseye Special. Later that same year, though, Charlton Comics went out of business; Charlton Publications followed suit in 1991, and its building and presses were demolished in 1999.

Editor Robin Snyder oversaw the sale of some properties to their creators, though most of the rights were purchased by Canadian entrepreneur Roger Broughton. He produced several reprint titles under the company name of Avalon Communications and its imprint America's Comics Group (ACG for short, Broughton having also purchased the rights to the defunct American Comics Group properties), and announced plans to restart Charlton Comics. This did not occur beyond its publishing a number of reprints and changing his company name to Charlton Media Group.

Most of Charlton's line of action heroes were acquired in 1983 for $5000 a character by Paul Levitz at DC Comics, as a gift to managing editor and former Charlton editor Dick Giordano. These "Action Hero" characters were proposed to be used in the landmark Watchmen miniseries written by Alan Moore, but DC then chose to save the characters for other uses. Moore instead developed new characters loosely based on them. The Charlton characters were incorporated into DC's main superhero line, starting in the epic Crisis on Infinite Earths miniseries of 1985.

Charlton's original strength, doing everything in-house, like art, lettering, editorial, printing, packaging and distribution, had helped them survive when America's largest distributor, American News Company, closed its doors. But this gradually turned into a weakness as their old equipment was stuck in the past, while other companies used more modern equipment that was faster, had higher quality and was more efficient, which contributed to their decline and fall.

=== Fan revivals ===
In 2000, Charlton Spotlight, a fanzine devoted to Charlton, began publication.

In 2014, comics writers Mort Todd, Paul Kupperberg, and Roger McKenzie founded a revival imprint named Charlton Neo, which relied heavily on crowdfunding, and printed stories featuring Charlton characters and titles not owned by DC. In May 2017, AC Comics announced that they had entered into an agreement to bring print versions of Charlton Neo's comics to the direct-sales comic shop market, starting with Charlton Arrow #1 in September. The Charlton Arrow, an anthology series featuring many Charlton characters, was the company's main product and only title sold in stores, but the company ran a number of other titles through mail-order and digital sales. In January 2018, citing poor sales and "a variety of financial calamities," Todd launched a GoFundMe campaign to "help save" the company. Todd died suddenly in 2025.

== See also ==
- List of Charlton Comics publications
