= Fightin' Army =

- Fightin' Army #66 (Dec. 1965), artwork by Pat Masulli and Rocke Mastroserio.

Publication information
- Publisher: Charlton Comics
- Schedule: Bi-monthly
- Format: Anthology
- Publication date: Jan. 1956 - Nov. 1984
- No. of issues: 157
- Main character(s): "The Lonely War of Willy Schultz"
- Editor(s): Al Fago (1956–1957); Pat Masulli (1957–1966); Dick Giordano (1966–1968); Sal Gentile (1968–1971); George Wildman (1971–1984)

Fightin' Army is a bimonthly war comic that was published by Charlton Comics from 1956–1984 (though it was primarily a reprint title from 1978 to the end of its run). Telling fictional stories of the United States Army, it was a sister title of the other Charlton war comics Fightin' Air Force, Fightin' Marines, and Fightin' Navy.

In the late 1960s, Fightin' Army was the host of the ongoing feature "The Lonely War of Willy Schultz", written by Will Franz and illustrated by Sam Glanzman. Other notable contributors to Fightin' Army included Jon D'Agostino, Sanho Kim, Jack Keller, Rocke Mastroserio, and Warren Sattler. Don Perlin drew a majority of covers in 1972–1973. Editors Pat Masulli (1957–1966) and George Wildman (1971–1984) both had long tenures in charge of the title.

== Publication history ==
As with many comic book titles published at the time, Fightin' Army did not start with issue number one; it was a renaming of a series called Soldier and Marine Comics, which published five issues, numbered #99–69, from Dec. 1954 - Aug. 1959.

The title became Fightin' Army with issue #15, published in January 1956. Early issues of Fightin' Army sported such taglines as "Breathtaking Action Stories", "Action Packed Battle Stories", "Thrill Packed Combat", and "Rip-Snorting Combat Tales". Issues #120 – #126 (Sept. 1969 – Oct. 1969) featured painted covers.

Like the entire Charlton line, Fightin' Army went on a publishing hiatus between January and August 1969, issues #126 and #127. From issue #132 (Apr. 1978) onward, Fightin' Army was primarily a reprint title, mostly using material from earlier issues, as well as the 1963–1970 Charlton title Army War Heroes. Fightin' Army ran through issue #173, publishing a total of 157 issues.

== Features ==
The Fightin' Army letter column was called "Weapons, Wars, and Wisdom". Reader letters were answered by the fictional "General Knowett".

The bulk of the stories in Fightin' Army take place during World War II, but as the series moved along, more were set during the Korean War. The Vietnam War was only rarely featured, and only made the cover of two issues, #65 (Dec. 1965) and #135 (Nov. 1978).

=== "The Lonely War of Willy Schultz" ===
From 1967–1970, Fightin' Army ran an ongoing World War II feature called "The Lonely War of Willy Schultz", written by Will Franz and illustrated by Sam Glanzman. "Willy Schultz" was a departure from most other combat features of this time, with its conflicted hero caught between loyalties, in part because of his German heritage. During combat in the European Theater, U.S. Army captain Schultz is falsely accused and convicted of murder; he escapes and blends into the German Army while seeking a way to clear his name and retain his Allied allegiance. The feature, reprinted as late as 1999, was serialized in Charlton's Fightin' Army #76–92 (Oct. 1967 - July 1970), skipping only issue #81. In 2023, Dark Horse released a collected edition, including an added final chapter drawn by Wayne Vansant and an introduction by Stephen R. Bissette.

== In popular culture ==
John Taylor of the band Duran Duran can briefly be seen reading issue #157 (cover dated April 1982) of Fightin' Army in the music video for their song "Rio".
