= Rocke Mastroserio =

American comic book artist

- Born: Rocco A. Mastroserio; June 8, 1927 Staten Island, New York City, New York, U.S.
- Died: Early March 1968 (aged 40)
- Areas: Penciller, Inker
- Pseudonyms: Rocke; Rocke M RM; RAM

Rocco A. "Rocke" Mastroserio (June 8, 1927 — early March 1968) was an American comic book artist best known as a penciler and inker for Charlton Comics. He sometimes signed his work "Rocke M.," "RM," "Rocke," or "RAM."

== Biography ==
=== Early career ===
Rocco Mastroserio was born in Staten Island, New York City, New York. He became interested in art as a child, and won medals in elementary-school art contests sponsored by the department store Wanamaker's. Living with his family in the Hell's Kitchen neighborhood of Manhattan, he attended elementary school in that New York City borough, followed by the School of Industrial Art. There he became friends with classmate Joe Orlando, a future comics artist. Mastroserio broke into the field at 17, as an inker for penciler Lennie Cole of Continental Comics. He also became a staff art assistant at All-American Comics, a precursor of DC Comics, doing pasteups, some lettering and art corrections. Within three months, he joined the U.S. Marine Corps, and after basic training at Parris Island, was assigned to the Marine Corps Institute, where he did illustrations and calligraphy. After his discharge, Mastroserio worked in comics by day and for three years took night classes at New York's Cartoonists and Illustrators School, later renamed the School of Visual Arts, studying under instructor Burne Hogarth and others.

Because comic-book writers and artists during this time were not regularly given published credits, a full bibliography is not always possible. Mastroserio's first confirmed comics work is in Avon Comics' Famous Gangsters #2 (cover-dated Dec. 1951), inking penciler Mike Becker on the seven-page crime fiction story "Waxie Gordon". With his first name variously credited as "Rocco" or "Rocke", he inked stories for a variety of publishers and titles, including Prize Comics' Prize Comics Western; American Comics Group's Adventures into the Unknown and Operation: Peril; Key Publications' Mister Mystery; and the Harvey Comics' horror anthologies Black Cat Mystery, Chamber of Chills, Tales of Horror, and Tomb of Terror, and Comic Media's Horrific.

=== Charlton Comics ===
His first known work at Charlton, where he would spend the bulk of his career into the 1960s, was the four-page humor story "The Ride of Paul Revere!", penciled and inked by Mastroserio and Dick Ayers as, respectively, "Rock" and "Rye", in the Mad-like satiric comic Eh! #4 (June 1954).

Mastroserio's work for Charlton included such Western series as Billy the Kid, Black Fury, Rocky Lane's Black Jack, and Texas Rangers in Action; crime fiction such as Public Defender in Action, Racket Squad in Action, and Rookie Cop; science fiction/fantasy titles such as Mysteries of Unexplored Worlds, Outer Space, and Strange Suspense Stories; jungle title such as Nyoka the Jungle Girl, and Ramar of the Jungle; the historical-adventure titles Long John Silver & the Pirates and Robin Hood and his Merry Men; war comics including Army War Heroes, Fightin' Army, and The Fightin' 5; and such supernatural anthologies as Ghostly Tales, Unusual Tales, and The Many Ghosts of Doctor Graves.

He inked all but the last two issues of Captain Atom, the full run of which numbered #78-89 (Dec. 1965 - Dec. 1967), penciled by comics artist Steve Ditko, co-creator of Marvel Comics' Spider-Man, who almost invariably inked his own work.

Other work in Charlton's occasional superhero titles including co-creating Mercury Man, with an unknown writer; the character appeared only twice, in Space Adventures #44-45 (Feb. 1962), with Mastroserio drawing only the debut. Other Charlton superhero work includes one-page fillers in some issues of Blue Beetle. Mastroserio also pencilled and inked stories of the masked Old West hero Gunmaster.

=== Later career ===
In the late 1960s Mastroserio drew stories for Warren Publishing's black-and-white horror magazines Creepy and Eerie, often working with writer Archie Goodwin. Both penciling and inking, he made his Warren debut with the six-page "Monsterwork" in Eerie #3 (May 1966). He helped his friend Pat Boyette, a fellow Charlton artist, join the stable of Warren creators, initially having him ghost-pencil, uncredited, "The Rescue of the Morning Maid" in Creepy #18 (Jan. 1968), which credited artist Mastroserio as inker.

Mastroserio's final Warren work was inking Boyette on "The Graves of Oconoco" in Eerie #15 (June 1968). Mastroserio died of a heart attack in early March (possibly March 4), shortly after completing that story, and the following issue ran a memorial page. His final published comics work was the full cover art and nine inked story pages, over penciler Mo Marcus, of Charlton's Ghost Manor #3 (Nov. 1968).

== Reprints ==
Mastroserio's first known comics work, from Famous Gangsters #2 (December 1951), was reprinted in Skywald Publications' black-and-white comics magazine The Crime Machine (May 1971). His Mercury Man story appears in reprint specialist AC Comics' Men of Mystery #32 (2001).

Mastroserio stories appear in the DC Comics hardcover collection Action Hero Archives Volume 1, the company's first archive of Charlton material. The book collects penciler Steve Ditko's 1960-66 Captain Atom stories.
