= Sarge Steel =

- Sarge Steel as depicted in Sarge Steel, Private Detective #1 (December 1964). Art by Dick Giordano.

Publication information
- Publisher: Charlton Comics, now DC Comics
- First appearance: Sarge Steel #1 (December 1964)
- Created by: Pat Masulli

In-story information
- Team affiliations: CBI; L.A.W. Checkmate; Department of Metahuman Affairs
- Abilities: Prosthetic metallic left hand.

Sarge Steel is a detective/spy character published by Charlton Comics during the 1960s. As he was published during the time of Charlton's Action Heroes line of superheroes, and had loose ties to some, he is sometimes included with that group. He was purchased by DC Comics along with the other "Action Heroes".

Sarge (short for "Sargent" as in "Sargent Shriver") Steel has a mechanical left hand. As Dick Giordano stated in the editorial page of L.A.W. #4 he was created by Pat Masulli, and later written and drawn by Joe Gill and artist Dick Giordano. Other artists, including the team of Bill Montes and Ernie Bache, would later take over.

== Publication history ==
Sarge Steel first appeared in his own title, Sarge Steel #1 (December 1964). His title would last until #8, at which point it was retitled Secret Agent (Gold Key Comics also published a comic with the same title in 1967 based upon the television series, Danger Man), and cancelled with #10 (October, 1967). After that, his series continued in Judomaster #91-98 (the stories in #91-96 fit in the year-long hiatus between issues #9 & #10, as all his stories are listed as 'File #xxx'). Sarge also appeared in short spots on self-defense in Fightin' 5 #34 and 37 and in the Sentinels stories in Peter Cannon, Thunderbolt #57 and 58 as their CIA contact.

== Fictional character biography ==
=== Charlton Comics version ===
Sarge was originally a hardboiled private eye (in fact, in the book The Fine Art of Murder, Max Allan Collins notes that Steel was the first fictional private eye to be a Vietnam veteran), who somehow also got involved in "spy cases" and became, by Sarge Steel #6, a "special agent".

Sarge Steel's enemies included characters like The Lynx, Ivan Crunch, Smiling Skull (a Nazi villain who fought Judomaster during World War II), Werner Von Wess, Mr. Ize, and others.

=== DC Comics version ===
In the DC Comics continuity, Sarge is put in charge of the United States' governmental agencies involved with "superhuman" activities for many years. He is the head of the CBI (Central Bureau of Intelligence), which also included King Faraday and his agents Richard Dragon and Ben Turner. Sarge is later depicted as a Federal Cabinet Secretary of Metahuman Affairs, giving him control of agencies such as the Suicide Squad.

Around this time, Mister Mind is handed over to Steel's custody. Mind takes control of Steel, hiding inside his artificial hand to escape detection. Controlling Steel, Mind attacks the midwest American city of Fairfield with a nuclear weapon. Though the bomb's detonation is contained to the limits of the town, thousands of civilians are killed.

Steel is in charge of Nemesis and Diana Prince as part of the Department of Metahuman Affairs. During his time at that post, the villain Circe kidnaps Steel and has him replaced with her shapeshifting henchman Everyman. Using Steel's pull at the agency, Circe and Everyman orchestrate the events of Amazons Attack!. Steel is freed, but is left suspicious of Wonder Woman's motives.

Psycho manages to switch bodies with Sarge Steel. He is then brainwashed into being a jester in a cage fight that Wonder Woman and Black Canary infiltrate. Diana uses her Lasso of Truth on him to remove the influence of mind control. Now remembering everything and understandably furious, Steel helps Wonder Woman and Black Canary capture Psycho, who is behind the illegal cage battles, to reverse the swap.

=== The New 52 ===
In The New 52 continuity reboot, Sarge Steel is an agent of Checkmate. He is put in charge of investigating the OMAC attacks at Project Cadmus when Brother Eye goes rogue. Maxwell Lord sends him as the leader of a team of elite agents including Maribel and Little Knipper to hunt down OMAC, but their attempt to capture him fails. For this failure, Lord takes him off the assignment and sends Mokkari to take down OMAC instead. Sarge voices his displeasure when they call in S.H.A.D.E. agent Frankenstein to do the job. In Checkmate's last battle against Brother Eye, Steel is called in again to lead his team against OMAC. They fight through Checkmate Headquarters in Mount Rushmore and Steel loses his hand in the fight.

=== Dawn of DC ===
After an Amazon warrior murders a group of men in a pool hall in Billings, Montana, Steel leads the US army in forcing all Amazons residing in America to be deported back to Themyscira, and rallies the troops against Wonder Woman when she refuses to leave. In the storyline "Titans: Beast World", Sarge Steel partakes in Amanda Waller's efforts to kill the transformed Beast Boy and his spores by having Chunk self-destruct inside him.

== Other versions ==
An alternate universe version of Sarge Steel appears in The Multiversity chapter "Pax Americana".

== In other media ==
- A character based on Sarge Steel named Commander Henry Steel appears in Naomi, portrayed by Brian Brightman. This version is a member of the Unidentified Aerial Phenomena Task Force.
- Sarge Steel appears in Batman and Harley Quinn, voiced by John DiMaggio. This version is an A.R.G.U.S. commander.
