= Midnight Tales =

American horror-suspense anthology comic book series

- Midnight Tales #1 (Dec. 1972), art by Wayne Howard.

Publication information
- Publisher: Charlton Comics
- Schedule: Bimonthly
- Format: anthology
- Genre: Horror
- Publication date: Dec. 1972-May 1976
- No. of issues: 18
- Main character(s): Professor Coffin the Midnight Philosopher and Arachne Coffin

Creative team
- Written by: Nicola Cuti
- Artist(s): Wayne Howard
- Editor(s): George Wildman

Midnight Tales is an American horror-suspense anthology comic book series created by Wayne Howard that was published by Charlton Comics from 1972 to 1976. The book was "hosted" by Professor Coffin (a.k.a. the Midnight Philosopher) and his niece Arachne (the book followed a standard formula where each issue's first story was a framing sequence divided up among the other stories). The setting, Xanadu University, was a tie-in with the Charlton series E-Man.

Charlton took the unusual step of giving Howard a "created by" credit on each issue's cover, providing a precedent for such credits eventually becoming common years later beginning with DC's Vertigo imprint. Charlton writer/editor Nick Cuti described Howard's credit being granted because the book, "... was his idea, his concept, his everything". In addition, each issue shared a theme: "One time it would be blob monsters, and I wrote three stories about blob monsters, and another time it was vampires ... and that sort of thing". Howard penciled and inked every cover and virtually every story, and occasionally scripted stories as well.

According to critic Mark Andrew:

Old dude and his sexy niece traipse across the countryside, bumping into oddball characters who invariably have a story to tell.... Sadly, since Charlton didn't want to do anything that'd offend your average nine-year-old, you can feel this book fighting against the uber-restrictive comics code. Kinda sad, really. What is good, however, are the artists in this book, easily the equal of anyone workin' at Marvel or DC at the time. You got Wayne Howard ... probably the most deft practitioner of the Wally Wood school ever.

== Publication history ==
Midnight Tales was part of a wave of new horror and suspense comics published by Charlton during this period. Its sister titles were the Charlton anthologies The Many Ghosts of Doctor Graves (with host Dr. M. T. Graves), Ghostly Tales (with host Mr. L. Dedd, later I. M. Dedd), Ghost Manor (with host Mr. Bones), Ghostly Haunts (with host Winnie the Witch), Haunted (with hosts Impy and then Baron Weirwulf), and Scary Tales (with host Countess R. H. Von Bludd).

Midnight Tales appeared bimonthly; altogether, it published 18 issues. In Oct. 1985, Charlton briefly revived the title as a reprint book, changing its name to Professor Coffin, and continued the numbering for three more issues before finally ceasing publication in 1986.

Besides Howard, other contributors to Midnight Tales included Nicola Cuti, Don Newton, Joe Staton, and Tom Sutton. George Wildman edited the book for its entire run.
