= Fightin' Marines =

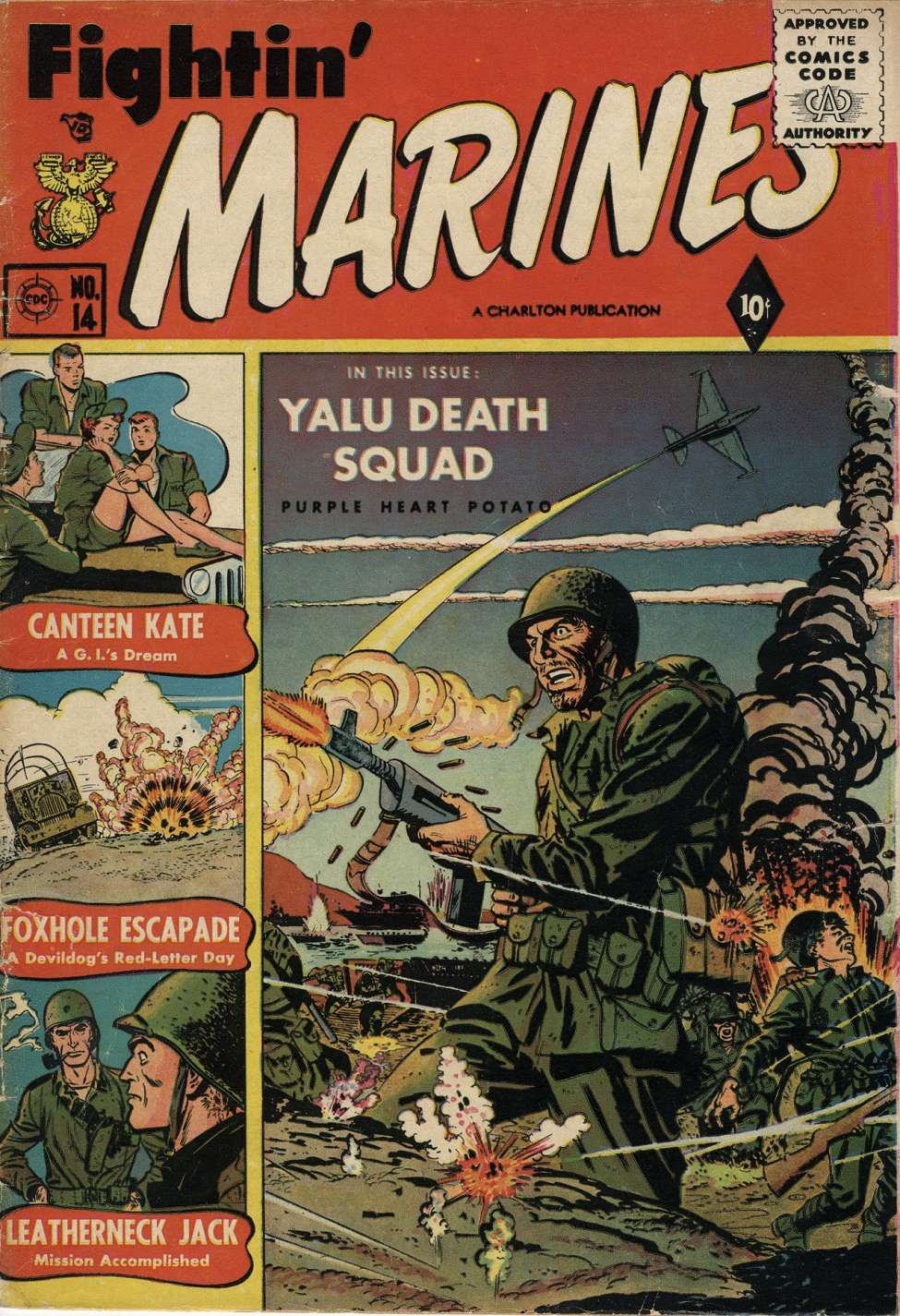
- Cover of Fightin' Marines #14, the first issue published by Charlton.

Publication information
- Publisher: St. John Publications; Charlton Comics
- Schedule: Bi-monthly
- Format: Anthology
- Publication date: October 1951 – September 1984
- No. of issues: 174

Creative team
- Written by: Joe Gill
- Artist(s): Pat Boyette, Sam Glanzman, Jack Keller, Sanho Kim, Fran Matera, Warren Sattler

Fightin' Marines is a bimonthly war comic magazine that was published by St. John Publications from 1951–1953, and Charlton Comics from 1955–1984, although it was primarily a reprint title from 1978 to the end of its run. Telling fictional stories of the United States Marine Corps, it was a sister title of the other Charlton war comics Fightin' Air Force, Fightin' Army, and Fightin' Navy.

Fightin' Marines was the home of the long-running Vietnam War feature "Shotgun Harker and Chicken", written by Joe Gill. Gill wrote the majority of stories for the title during its entire run. Other notable contributors to Fightin' Marines included Pat Boyette, Sam Glanzman, Jack Keller, Sanho Kim, Fran Matera, and Warren Sattler.

== Publication history ==
As with many comic book titles published at the time, Fightin' Marines did not start with issue number one; it continued from issues #1–14 (August 1948–June 1951) of St. John Publications' The Texan, as Fightin' Marines #15 in August 1951. While St. John also continued The Texan with #15 in October 1951 (ending with The Fightin' Texan #17 in December 1952), it published #2–12 of Fightin' Marines from October 1951–March 1953.

Charlton took over the series in May 1955 with issue #14 (no issue #13 was published). Early issues of Fightin' Marines sported such taglines as "Breathtaking Action Stories", "Leathernecks in Combat", and "Rip-Snortin' Action Tales". Issues #121 – #130 (March 1975 – July 1976) featured painted covers. Issue #122 was called Fightin' Marines Presents War, which was a tryout issue for the new Charlton title War, which ran from July 1975 – October 1984. From issue #131 (September 1976) onward, the cover of each issue featured a head shot of a Marine in dress uniform in the upper left hand corner, next to the title.

Like much of the Charlton line, Fightin' Marines went on a publishing hiatus between November 1976 and October 1977 (issues #132 and 133). From issue #136 (April 1978) onward, Fightin' Marines was primarily a reprint title, mostly using material from earlier issues. The series ran through issue #176; Charlton published a total of 163 issues.

== Features ==
The cover art for Fightin' Marines #5 is by Matt Baker, best known for his work on Quality Comics' Phantom Lady.

Among the characters featured in early issues of Fightin' Marines is Canteen Kate, who appeared in issues #2-9 and #14–15. The character starred in three issues of her own title in 1952. Another recurring character from early issues of Fightin' Marines is Leatherneck Jack, who appeared in issues #2–15.

A topic addressed in Fightin' Marines #42 is Communist intrigue in Europe. The writer's opinion left no doubt that Communists were the enemy and needed to be eradicated. The bulk of the stories in Fightin' Marines take place during World War II and the Korean War, but as the series moved along, more were set during the Vietnam War, to better show the menace of Communism.

=== Shotgun Harker and Chicken ===
The ongoing Vietnam War feature Shotgun Harker and Chicken ran in Fightin' Marines issues #78–108, from January 1968 – January 1973. Created by writer Joe Gill and artists Bill Montes and Ernie Bache, the series starred Sgt. Arkie "Shotgun" Harker and PFC "Chicken" Smith of Alpha Company. Harker is the gung-ho, hard-bitten Marine, while the bespectacled, blond-haired Chicken is more reserved — though not actually a coward. Perhaps reflecting 1960s counterculture and the antiwar movement, Chicken was occasionally portrayed with flowers on his helmet.

Shotgun Harker and Chicken stories were reprinted in Fightin' Army issues #140, 141, 146, 148, 156, 163, 167, 168, 172, 173, and 175 (as well as the Charlton titles War #45 and Battlefield Action #69 and #81).
