= Fightin' 5 =

Fictional paramilitary team appearing in Charlton Comics

- The Fightin 5 from Fightin' 5 #28, artist Bill Montes.

Publication information
- Publisher: Charlton Comics; ACG
- First appearance: Fightin' 5 #28 (July 1964)
- Created by: Joe Gill (writer); Bill Monte (artist)

In-story information
- Member(s): Frenchie the Fox; Granite Gallero; Hank Hennessey; Irv David; Sonya; Tom Tom

The Fightin' 5 are a Charlton Comics Special Forces paramilitary team, similar to DC Comics' Blackhawks. They debuted in Fightin' 5 #28 (July 1964), and were created by Joe Gill and Bill Montes.

== Publication history ==
The Fightin' 5 comic started in July, 1964 with issues #28 (continuing the numbering of the 1959 Charlton series Space War), and ran until #41 in January 1967. After the cancellation, the characters starred in a backup feature in Peacemaker. Toward the end of the original series, the team took on a disastrous mission which resulted in the death of Irv, while team leader Hank lost an eye and arm. During the Peacemaker run the team added an ex-Soviet agent named Sonya to the group, and Hank was relegated to the role of tactician and organizer.

From 1981 to 1982, Charlton committed to a partial reprint of the series, running from issue #42 through issue #49. When the Charlton Comics Group was dissolved, the trademark and indica of these characters was purchased by Canadian publisher Roger Broughton. Broughton issued one reprint series, under the title The Power of Five.

== Fictional team biography ==
These five men were recruited by the CIA in the fall of 1963, during the height of the Cold War. This team consisted of five commandos, their initials spelling out, "FIGHT". The five undertook missions around the world fighting international terrorists, despotic rulers, and thwarting Communist agents. They wore bright blue BDU's with red berets. They usually flew around in a modified Convair B-58 Hustler Supersonic Bomber and used many different military-use weapons systems as well as James Bond-like gadgets to accomplish their missions.

== Membership ==
- FF1: Frenchie the Fox - A rather stereotypical French American and ex-US Navy underwater demolitions expert.
- FF2: Irv "The Nerve" David - A decorated former Israeli commando, member of Haganah and private investigator.
- FF3: Granite Gallero - A former mercenary and weapons expert.
- FF4: Hank Hennessey - A career US Army Captain in the Special Forces and Vietnam War veteran.
- FF5: Tom-Tom - A former professional wrestler.
