= Vince Alascia =

American comic book artist (1914-1998)

- Vince Alascia, circa 1942
- Born: Vincent Alascia; January 14, 1914
- Died: September 3, 1998 (aged 84)
- Areas: Penciller, Inker
- Pseudonym: Nicholas Alascia

Vincent Alascia (January 14, 1914 – September 3, 1998), also known as Nicholas Alascia, was an American comic book artist known for his work on Captain America during the Golden Age of comics, and for his 23-year run as inker on a single creative team, with penciler Charles Nicholas Wojtkowski (as "Charles Nicholas") and writer Joe Gill at Charlton Comics from 1953 to 1976.

== Biography ==
=== Early life and career ===
Vince Alascia was on staff at Timely Comics, the 1940s predecessor of Marvel Comics, where the artist and comics historian Jim Steranko credits him for art as early as USA Comics #5 (Summer 1942), on the masked-crimefighter feature "American Avenger". When Captain America creators Joe Simon and Jack Kirby left Timely after issue #10 (Jan. 1942) of the eponymous book, Alascia penciled the hero's adventures in the sister title All Select Comics #2–10 (Winter 1943/1944 to Summer 1946), generally inked by Allen Bellman, and in several issues of All Winners Comics, with a variety of inkers, starting with #11 (Winter 1943/1944). Syd Shores and Al Avison had taken over art duties on Captain America Comics, and Alascia shortly afterward filled-in as Shores' inker while Avison did his World War II military service.

Alascia later went into rotation as one of the various Captain America Comics artists in any given issue. Examples of his work in that flagship title include the story "Ali Baba and His Forty Nazis" in issue #32 (Nov. 1943), inking Ken Bald, and "The Crime Dictator" in issue #47 (June 1945), which Alascia penciled.

It was Alascia, inked by Bob Powell, who drew the Captain American and Bucky chapters in the two magazine-length stories – rare for the time – of the superhero team the All-Winners Squad in the (non-hyphenated) All Winners Comics #19 (Fall 1946) and #21 (Winter 1946; there was no issue #20). Additionally, in issue #19, Alascia inked Shores on the chapter starring superheroine Miss America. In issue #21, he also pencilled both the Whizzer chapter and the final chapter, and inked Avison's Sub-Mariner chapter.

Other Timely work includes stories featuring the Young Allies in Kid Komics and The Young Allies; the Patriot in the omnibus title Marvel Mystery Comics; and occasional work in Blonde Phantom.

=== Later career ===
Detail from Charlton Comics' The Iron Corporal, vol. 3, #25 (Feb. 1986). Art by Charles Nicholas and Vince Alascia.

After Timely's downsizing in 1948, Alascia freelanced for such other comics companies as Avon, where he inked Martin Nodell, creator of Green Lantern, on anthological horror stories in that publisher's 1950s comics City of the Living Dead and Eerie (no relation to Warren Publishing's black-and-white horror-comics magazine of that name). A Modell/Alascia Eerie story was reprinted in Skywald Publications, Nightmare #1 (Dec. 1970).

Mostly, however, Alascia worked with Charlton Comics of Derby, Connecticut, where he was teamed with Charles Nicholas (the 1921–1985 comics artist of that name) on a full gamut of crime, suspense, mystery, science fiction, war, Western, romance, and hot-rod titles, beginning with Crime and Justice #16 (Jan. 1953). The art team would sometimes sign its work Nicholas & Alascia, as in the panel at left. As a penciler, Alascia's work for Charlton includes the August 1956 premiere issue of Tales of the Mysterious Traveler.

== Critical assessment ==
Comics historian Jess Nevins said, "Alascia is one of those pros who did a wide range of work on a number of books over the years, but is almost completely forgotten about today; he did some work on Captain America [Comics] and on U.S. Marines in Action, and Six-Gun Heroes. His work ... strikes me as a cross between Sheldon Moldoff and Mort Meskin, and if you know anything about Golden Age artists, you know that those two are names to conjure with".

Artist Gill Fox had a different view, recalling that Alascia had taken "an art course that was an offshoot of the course at Textile High School, in New York City. I was deeply impressed with Vince's talent; he did great stuff for the yearbook. Years later, I went to see him and he had totally changed. I tried to get him to make a move into a better kind of work, but I couldn't get him to do it. Vince had an uninspired art career".

Charlton Comics and DC Comics editor Dick Giordano felt that, "If you take a close look at Vince's inking style, you'll find it bears a close resemblance to Alex Raymond's style on Rip Kirby; that was very popular at that time. ... Vince used to have these Rip Kirby strips in front of him, looking at them while he was inking. But what he was inking had nothing to do with the strip he was looking at. I don't know what he got out of it except inspiration".
