= Charles Nicholas =

Pseudonyms of three early creators of American comic books

"Charles Nicholas" is the pseudonymous house name of three early creators of American comic books for the Fox Feature Syndicate and Fox Comics: Chuck Cuidera (1915–2001), Jack Kirby (1917–1994), and Charles Wojtkoski (1921–1985). The name originated at Eisner & Iger, one of the first comic book packagers that created comics on demand for publishers entering the new medium during the 1930s–1940s Golden Age of comic books. The three creators are listed in order of birth year, below.

== Origin of name ==
Will Eisner, co-principal of the comic-book packager Eisner & Iger during the 1930s–1940s Golden Age of comic books, and himself a comics creator, recalled in 1999 that at his company,

We had a whole bunch of phony names like Chuck's. We just handed them out with the salary. There was a period in comics beginning with the middle- to late-'30s when none of the artists owned their own drawings. They were hired by the publishers ... [who] used what the pulp magazines used – a thing called a house name. A fake name. So the publishers not only owned the comic strip, they owned the name [of the creator], therefore the guy working for them couldn't lay a claim. That's how the name 'Charles Nicholas' started.

== Chuck Cuidera ==
Chuck Cuidera
- Born: Charles Nicholas Cuidera; September 23, 1915
- Died: August 25, 2001 (aged 85)
- Area: Artist
- Notable works: Blackhawk

Charles Nicholas Cuidera, also known as Chuck Cuidera (September 23, 1915 – August 25, 2001), was an American comic book artist best known as the first illustrator of the Quality Comics aviator character Blackhawk, in Military Comics #1–11 (Aug. 1941 – Aug. 1942). Cuidera was also an early artist of the superhero Blue Beetle, yet though he claimed, in his very late years, that he was the Charles Nicholas who created that character, comics historians credit Charles Wojtkowski, who also used the Charles Nicholas pseudonym.

Cuidera grew up in Newark, New Jersey, and after earning art scholarships graduated from Pratt Institute in 1939. Breaking into comic books at Fox Feature Syndicate, where he drew Blue Beetle stories, he shortly afterward migrated to the Eisner & Iger shop.

There he drew the first 11 stories of Blackhawk, the creation of which is also vaguely recorded from the early days of comics, when proper writer-artist credits were not a standard feature. Though reference sources list Eisner as scripter of the first four Blackhawk stories and Dick French beginning with issue #5, Cuidera said he created the character, and that Bob Powell scripted the debut story before turning the feature over to him: "I never drew a script by French. Powell wrote the first one and I wrote the rest until I went into the service". Eisner, who has also said he was involved in Blackhawk's initial writing, hedged the issue, saying, "Whether or not Chuck Cuidera created or thought of Blackhawk to begin with is unimportant [and] the fact that Chuck Cuidera made Blackhawk what it was is the important thing, and therefore, he should get the credit". As the debut artist who designed the characters, Cuidera is confirmably at least the co-creator.

During Cuidera's absence, Reed Crandall had become established on Blackhawk, which would become one of Crandall's signature features. Cuidera segued to work primarily on the Quality character Captain Triumph and later became the company's art director. When Quality sold DC Comics the rights of Blackhawk in 1956, the penciler by then, Dick Dillin, and inker Cuidera continued to work on the character for the new owner. Cuidera became the regular inker on a number of DC features and series, including Hawkman and The Brave and the Bold, before leaving comics in 1970.

Cuidera, an avid scuba diver, invented and sold a quick-release diver's weight belt, and also taught scuba in New Jersey YMCAs. He retired, and was a guest of honor at the 1999 Comic-Con International.

== Jack Kirby ==
Future industry legend Jack Kirby (1917–1994) used the name Charles Nicholas during his fledgling days, in 1940, adopting that house pseudonym during his three-month run as artist of the Fox Feature Syndicate comic strip version of the Blue Beetle.

== Charles Wojtkoski ==
Charles Wojtkoski
- Born: Charles Nicholas Wojtkoski; December 6, 1921
- Died: June 21, 1985 (aged 63)
- Areas: Writer, Artist
- Pseudonym: Charles Nicholas
- Notable works: Blue Beetle

Charles Nicholas Wojtkoski (December 6, 1921 – June 21, 1985) was an American comic book writer-artist best known as the credited creator of the Fox Comics character Blue Beetle, which in various incarnations has continued through three comics companies and into the 21st century.

The Blue Beetle first appeared in Fox Comics' superhero anthology series Mystery Men Comics #1 (Aug. 1939), with art by Wojtkoski (as Charles Nicholas), though the Grand Comics Database tentatively credits Will Eisner as the scripter. His family has said Wojtkowski "decided in the late 1930s to sell the rights to the character to raise money".

Detail from Charlton Comics' The Iron Corporal, vol. 3, #25 (Feb. 1986). Art by Charles Nicholas and Vince Alascia.

As Charles Nicholas, Wojtkoski variously penciled and inked stories for Timely Comics, the 1940s predecessor of Marvel Comics, where his credits include the character The Defender in USA Comics #1 (Aug. 1941), and stories in Young Allies Comics #1 (Summer 1941), Tough Kid Squad Comics #1 (March 1942), and Comedy Comics (during 1942). Following World War II military service with the Army Air Force, he returned to Timely, where, beginning with comics cover-dated Spring 1946, he worked on a variety of stories and covers for Captain America Comics, Human Torch Comics, Marvel Mystery Comics, Sub-Mariner Comics (where he drew the backup feature "Blonde Phantom"), and the landmark All Winners Comics #21 (Winter 1946/47), featuring Timely/Marvel's first superhero team, the (hyphenated) All-Winners Squad; Nicholas penciled the cover and the Miss America chapter, and inked penciler Al Avison's lead chapter.

Wojtkoski later worked on the Fawcett Comics jungle character Nyoka, and spent the remainder of his career in-house at Charlton Comics in Derby, Connecticut. There he enjoyed a remarkable 23-year run as penciler on a single creative team, with inker Vince Alascia (another Timely veteran) and writer Joe Gill. The art team would sometimes sign its work Nicholas & Alascia, as in the panel at left.

In 1978–79, Wojtkoski drew comics for editor Vincent Fago on Pendulum Press's Contemporary Motivators series, a line of comic book adaptations of inspiring stories and morality tales like Banner in the Sky, God Is My Co-Pilot, Guadalcanal Diary, The Diary of Anne Frank, and Lost Horizon; as well as a rough adaptation of Star Wars.

After Charlton went defunct in the mid-1980s, Wojtkoski drew for the satiric magazine Cracked and for Marvel Comics' The Incredible Hulk comic strip, as well as for the first Transformers hardcover children's books and coloring books.
