= Charlton Media Group (Canada) =

Publisher of comics based in Montreal

- Industry: Comics
- Founded: 1986
- Founder: Roger Broughton
- Headquarters: Montreal, Quebec, Canada
- Owner: Avalon Communications
- Divisions: A+/A-Plus; ACG Classix; America's Comics Group; Sword in Stone

Charlton Media Group (CMG) is a Montreal-based publisher owned and operated by Canadian entrepreneur Roger Broughton. CMG has published Charlton Comics and American Comics Group reprint comics, under several names, including Sword in Stone, A+, and America's Comics Group.

== History ==
Long-time comics publisher Charlton Comics went out of business in 1985. Most of Charlton's superhero characters had been acquired in 1983 by DC Comics, and Broughton's company Sword in Stone Productions purchased the reprint rights to the remaining Charlton Comics properties in 1986.

Broughton produced several reprint titles under the company name of Avalon Communications and its imprint America's Comics Group (ACG), Broughton having also purchased the rights to the defunct American Comics Group properties. Broughton at first concentrated on syndicating material worldwide, while publishing a few comics titles in America, including the 1999 ACG Classix imprint Pulp Comics, which primarily reprinted the early 1940s syndicated newspaper strip, The Shadow, based on the popular Street and Smith Shadow pulp novels and famous radio show character. Charlton material appeared in Europe, Asia, and South Africa. Many children's titles were reprinted by Harvey Comics.

== Merger ==
In 2002, Broughton announced the merger of ACG with a film production company and a graphic design firm to form the "Charlton Media Group" (not related to the Charlton Media Group of Singapore, which produces business-related publications), created in part to publish new comics and reprints featuring Charlton and ACG characters. So far only ACG and Charlton reprints have seen the light of day.

In 2007, an agreement was signed with Dark Horse Comics to reprint American Comics Group's 1960s superheroes, Nemesis and Magicman, and original Herbie comics stories. Thus far, Dark Horse has reprinted all the Herbie stories in three volumes, and single-volume reprints of Nemesis and Magicman.
