= War comics =

Comic book genre

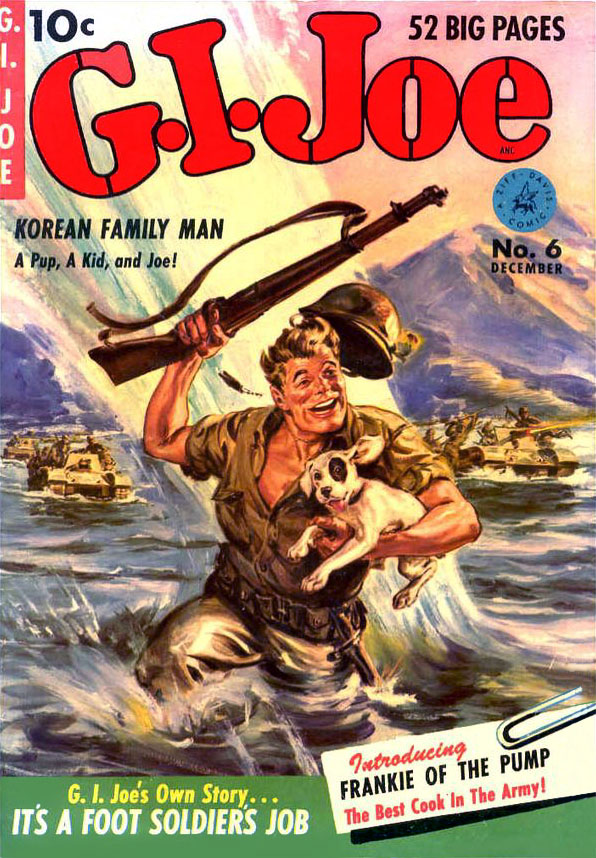
- G.I. Joe # 6 (December 1951). Cover art by Norman Saunders.
- Authors: Harvey Kurtzman; Robert Kanigher; Joe Kubert; John Severin; Russ Heath
- Publishers: Quality Comics; DC Comics; Marvel Comics; Charlton Comics
- Publications: Blackhawk; Sgt. Fury and his Howling Commandos; Sgt. Rock; G.I. Combat; Commando Comics
- Series: The Losers; The Lonely War of Willie Schultz; Ernie Pike; Enemy Ace; The War that Time Forgot

Subgenres
- Military science fiction comics; World War I comics; World War II comics; Vietnam War comics

War comics is a genre of comic books that gained popularity in English-speaking countries following World War II.

== History ==
=== American war comics ===
Shortly after the birth of the modern comic book in the mid- to late 1930s, comics publishers began including stories of wartime adventures in the multi-genre omnibus titles then popular as a format. Even prior to the U.S. involvement in World War II after the attack at Pearl Harbor, Hawaii, comic books such as Captain America Comics #1 (March 1941) depicted superheroes fighting Adolf Hitler and the Nazis.

Golden Age publisher Quality Comics debuted its title Blackhawk in 1944; the title was published more or less continuously until the mid-1980s.

In the post-World War II era, comic books devoted solely to war stories began appearing and gained popularity in the United States and Canada through the 1950s, the 1960s, and 1970s, i.e. covering the time periods of the Korean War and the Vietnam War. The titles tended to concentrate on US military events, generally in World War II, the Korean War, and the Vietnam War. Most publishers produced anthologies; industry giant DC Comics' war comics included such long-running titles as All-American Men of War, Our Army at War, Our Fighting Forces, and Star Spangled War Stories. Another prolific publisher of war comics was Charlton Comics, which produced a wide variety of titles beginning in the 1950s, such as Battlefield Action, Fightin' Army, and Fightin' Marines. Quality also began publishing G.I. Combat during this era. Marvel Comics also produced war titles, notably Sgt. Fury and his Howling Commandos.

In contrast to the typical glamorizing approach of most war titles, the EC Comics titles Frontline Combat and Two-Fisted Tales (produced in the early 1950s) depicted the horrors of war realistically and in great detail, exposing what editor Harvey Kurtzman saw as the truth about war without idealizing it. (The mid-1960s black-and-white comics magazine Blazing Combat, produced by Warren Publishing, was similarly devoted to authentically drawn and researched combat stories with a self-professed anti-war slant.)

Around 1959, several recurring characters began to appear in mainstream comic lines, including Sgt. Rock and The Haunted Tank in the DC line. These recurring characters began as regular "guests" of anthology titles such as Our Army at War and later graduated to their own titles. Initially, the typical tone of the comics was largely simple action stories, but by the 1970s, the tone of the stories was often grim concerning the harsh realities of war and was fatalistic with the heroes more enduring their duty. In fact, the typical ending of the stories of that ere often ended with a message on a dot saying, "Make War No More'

=== End of the Silver Age ===
By the late 1980s, a great number of venerable war titles (most of which were either anthologies or else World War II-themed titles) from the late 1950s and 1960s "Silver Age of Comic Books" died out. War comics series that ended long runs in the 1980s, following publication of over 100 issues, include:

- Blackhawk (Quality/DC, 273 issues from 1944 to 1984)
- Fightin' Army (Charlton, 157 issues from 1956 to 1984)
- Fightin' Marines (Charlton, 163 issues from 1955 to 1984)
- G.I. Combat (Quality/DC, 288 issues from 1952 to 1987)
- Our Fighting Forces (DC, 181 issues from 1954 to 1978)
- Sgt. Fury and his Howling Commandos (Marvel, 167 issues from 1963 to 1981)
- Sgt. Rock (DC – includes a retitling of the earlier Our Army at War, the combined run was 422 issues from 1952 to 1988)
- Unknown Soldier (DC – a retitling of Star Spangled War Stories that ran from 1952 to 1977, then continued as The Unknown Soldier from 1977 to 1982, with number 268 the final issue).
- Weird War Tales (DC, 124 issues from 1971 to 1983)

New titles were still appearing, however – notable among these being Marvel's the 'Nam, which debuted in 1987 and was based during the first year on writer Doug Murray's actual Vietnam experiences (through the eyes of fictional character Ed Marks). Murray was surprised that his proposal for a Vietnam-war themed comic was accepted during this period: "I never expected anything to come of it because war books were already pretty much dead at that point in 1985." Another notable war comic focused on Vietnam was Don Lomax's Vietnam Journal, published by Apple Comics from 1987 to 1991.

Also from Marvel in the 1980s was the toy tie-in G.I. Joe: A Real American Hero which focused on a fictional counter-terrorist team in a contemporary setting and was advertised on television to take advantage of an advertising regulation loophole. There was also a limited run of Tales of the Marine Corps, similar in tone and style to Charlton's Fightin' line of war anthologies.

=== British war comics ===
Black and white anthology stories were popular in Britain in the 1960s and early 1970s. Examples include Commando Comics and weekly comics such as Battle Picture Weekly, The Victor, and Warlord.

== Reprints ==
Trade paperback reprint collections of war comics include:

- Blackhawk Archives Vol. 1 (reprints "Blackhawk" stories from Military Comics #1–17)
- Enemy Ace Archives Vol. 1 (reprints "Enemy Ace" stories from Showcase #57, 58, Star-Spangled War Stories #138–142)
- Enemy Ace Archives Vol. 2 (reprints Star-Spangled War Stories #143–145, 147–150, 152, 181–183, 200)
- The Losers by Jack Kirby (reprints Our Fighting Forces #151–162)
- Marvel Masterworks Sgt. Fury Vol. 1 (reprints Sgt. Fury and his Howling Commandos #1–13)
- Marvel Masterworks Sgt. Fury Vol. 2 (reprints Sgt. Fury and his Howling Commandos #14–23, Annual #1)
- Sgt. Rock Archives Vol. 1 (reprints G.I. Combat #68, Our Army at War #81–96)
- Sgt. Rock Archives Vol. 2 (reprints Our Army at War #97–110)
- Sgt. Rock Archives Vol. 3 (reprints Our Army at War #111–125)
- Showcase Presents Blackhawk Vol. 1 (reprints Blackhawk #108–127)
- Showcase Presents Enemy Ace Vol. 1 (reprints "Enemy Ace" stories from Our Army at War #151, 153, 155, Showcase #57–58, Star-Spangled War Stories #138–152, 158, 181–183, and 200, Detective Comics #404, Men at War #1–3, 8–10, 12–14, 19–20, The Unknown Soldier #252–253, 260–261, 265–267, DC Special #26)
- Showcase Presents The Haunted Tank Vol. 1 (reprints "The Haunted Tank" stories from G.I. Combat #87–119, The Brave and the Bold #52, Our Army at War #155)
- Showcase Presents The Haunted Tank Vol. 2 (reprints "The Haunted Tank" stories from G.I. Combat #120–157)
- Showcase Presents Sgt. Rock Vol. 1 (reprints "Sgt. Rock" stories from Our Army at War #81–117)
- Showcase Presents Sgt. Rock Vol. 2 (reprints "Sgt. Rock" stories from Our Army at War #118–148)
- Showcase Presents The Unknown Soldier Vol. 1 (reprints "Unknown Soldier" stories from Star-Spangled War Stories #151–190)
- Showcase Presents The War that Time Forgot Vol. 1 (reprints "The War that Time Forgot" stories from Star-Spangled War Stories #90–137)

== See also ==
- PS, The Preventive Maintenance Monthly, a US Army publication that uses the comics format for training purposes
