= Scary Tales (comics) =

Horror-suspense anthology comic book series

- Scary Tales #1 (Sept. 1971), art by Joe Staton.

Publication information
- Publisher: Charlton Comics
- Schedule: Bimonthly
- Format: anthology
- Genre: Horror
- Publication date: Aug. 1975-Oct. 1984
- No. of issues: 46
- Main character: Countess R.H. Von Bludd

Creative team
- Artist: Steve Ditko
- Editor: George Wildman

Scary Tales is a horror-suspense anthology comic book series that was published by Charlton Comics from 1975 to 1984. The book was "hosted" by Countess R. H. Von Bludd, an alluring vampiress in a tight-fitting dress. Artist Steve Ditko was a regular contributor to the book during its entire run.

Scary Tales was part of a wave of new horror and suspense comics published by Charlton during this period. Its sister titles, with many of the same creators, were the Charlton anthologies The Many Ghosts of Doctor Graves (with host Dr. M.T. Graves), Ghostly Tales (with host Mr. L. Dedd, later I. M. Dedd), Ghost Manor (with host Mr. Bones), Haunted (with hosts Impy and then Baron Weirwulf), and Ghostly Haunts (with host Winnie the Witch).

== Publication history ==
Scary Tales was published bimonthly; it went on a publishing hiatus between issues #9 and 10, which lasted from February to September 1977 (Charlton's horror titles all went on hiatus during this period); another publishing break occurred between issues #20 and 21 (July 1979–July 1980). After the cancellation of the short-lived Charlton Bullseye showcase comic in late 1982, stories intended for that title were published in Scary Tales #36-40, which explains the superhero story "Mr. Jigsaw" in issue #38 and "Dragon Force" in issue #40. Altogether, Scary Tales published 46 issues.

Regular contributors to Scary Tales in addition to Ditko included Pat Boyette, Nicola Cuti, Joe Gill, Wayne Howard, Sanho Kim, Rich Larson, Pete Morisi, Steve Morisi, Charles Nicholas, Don Perlin, and Mike Zeck. Ghostly Haunts was edited by George Wildman for its entire run.

Horror comics in general were in decline in the early 1980s, and Charlton in particular was suffering financially. In the fall of 1984, Charlton suspended publication, and Scary Tales was cancelled along with the rest of the company's remaining titles.
