= Haunted Love =

- Cover to Haunted Love #1 (Apr. 1973), art by Tom Sutton.

Publication information
- Publisher: Charlton Comics
- Schedule: Bimonthly
- Format: Ongoing series
- Genre: Horror, romance
- Publication date: April 1973 – September 1975
- No. of issues: 11

Creative team
- Written by: Joe Gill, Nick Cuti, Pete Morisi
- Artist(s): Charles Nicholas, Joe Staton, Steve Ditko, Sanho Kim, Enrique Nieto, Pat Boyette
- Inker(s): Vince Alascia
- Editor(s): George Wildman

Haunted Love is a horror-romance anthology comic book series that was published by American company Charlton Comics from 1973 to 1975. It was part of the Gothic Romance comic book mini-trend of the era, which included the short-lived DC Comics series The Dark Mansion Of Forbidden Love and The Sinister House of Secret Love, and Atlas/Seaboard Comics' one-shot magazine Gothic Romances. Haunted Love was also part of Charlton's wave of early 1970s horror-themed titles, including Ghostly Haunts, Haunted, Midnight Tales, and Scary Tales.

Edited by George Wildman, contributors to Haunted Love included writers Joe Gill, Nick Cuti, and Pete Morisi; and artists Charles Nicholas, Joe Staton, Steve Ditko, Sanho Kim, Enrique Nieto, Pat Boyette, and Vince Alascia. Tom Sutton contributed many of the covers.

The Charlton imprint Modern Comics published one issue of Haunted Love reprints in 1978.
