= Charlton Spotlight =

American magazine

- Publisher/editor: Michael Ambrose
- Categories: Charlton Comics history
- Publisher: Argo Press
- First issue: Fall 2000
- Country: United States
- Based in: Austin, Texas
- Language: English
- Website: http://www.charltonspotlight.net

Charlton Spotlight is an American magazine that explores the history of the Charlton Comics Group. It is published by Argo Press. Its publisher/editor is Michael Ambrose. The first issue was published in fall 2000 and nine issues have come out so far, the latest (No.9) cover dated 2015.

Charlton Comics veterans have been profiled in tribute issues. Pat Boyette (No.1–2), Tom Sutton (No.3), Pete Morisi ("PAM") (No.4), and Dick Giordano (No.7) were honored posthumously. Joe Gill (No.5), George Wildman (No.7), and Nicola Cuti were living recipients of this recognition. Several comic book professionals have been interviewed in Charlton Spotlight. They include Bill Black (No.2), Tom Sutton (No.3), José Delbo (No.3), Henry Scarpelli (No.3), Pete Morisi (No.4), Joe Gill (No.5), Hy Eisman (No.7), George Wildman (No.7), and Nicola Cuti (No.8). After a long delay, the ninth and most recent issue was released.

== Contributors ==
- Contributors to the magazine include former Charlton Comics employees, collectors, and comic book historians.
- Comic book professionals who have contributed new material to Charlton Spotlight include artists Jim Amash, Nicola Cuti, Henry Scarpelli, Joe Staton, Tom Sutton, Alex Toth, George Wildman, and Donnie Pitchford.
- Original Charlton writers include Nicola Cuti, Steve Skeates, Paul Kupperberg, and Joe Gill.
- Original Charlton Editors have included Nicola Cuti, George Wildman and Bill Pearson. Ron Frantz, Ramon Schenk, and Donnie Pitchford are credited as contributing editors.

== See also ==
- Charlton Bullseye (fanzine)
