= Ghost Manor (comics) =

- Ghost Manor (vol. 2), #1 (Oct. 1971), art by Pat Boyette.

Publication information
- Publisher: Charlton Comics
- Schedule: Bimonthly
- Format: anthology
- Genre: Horror
- Publication date: July 1968-July 1971 (vol. 1); Oct. 1971-Nov. 1984 (vol. 2)
- No. of issues: 19; 77
- Main character(s): Old Witch (vol. 1); Mr. Bones (vol. 2)
- Editor(s): Sal Gentile, George Wildman

Ghost Manor is a horror-suspense anthology comic book series that was published by Charlton Comics (in two volumes) from 1968 to 1984 (though it was primarily a reprint title from 1978 onward). Volume one was "hosted" by the Old Witch (not to be confused with the Old Witch who hosted the 1950s EC title, Haunt of Fear), while volume two was hosted by Mr. Bones.

Ghost Manor was part of a wave of new horror and suspense comics published by Charlton during this period. Its sister titles, with many of the same creators, were the Charlton anthologies The Many Ghosts of Doctor Graves (with host Dr. M. T. Graves), Haunted (with hosts Impy and then Baron Weirwulf), and Ghostly Tales (with host Mr. L. Dedd, later I. M. Dedd). Charlton's low page-rates and slapdash production values resulted in few notable characters or stories; Ghost Manor was typical in this regard.

== Publication history ==
Ghost Manor volume one debuted in July 1968 and was bimonthly during its run; all 19 issues were edited by Sal Gentile. The book's tagline was "Echoes of the Spirit World". With issue #20 (September 1971), the book changed its title to Ghostly Haunts, with the host, moddish, blue-skinned Winnie the Witch, who had debuted in Ghost Manor #13.

Ghost Manor volume two introduced a new host, Mr. Bones, a re-animated skeleton butler with a devilish mask. A new tagline was introduced, as well: "Visit Ghost Manor... if you Dare!" The second series was primarily edited by George Wildman, who took over the title from Gentile with issue #6 (August 1972) and helmed the book until its cancellation with issue #77 (Nov. 1984). Ghost Manor continued to be bimonthly, except for a publishing hiatus from January–August 1977, between issues #32 and #33.

Regular contributors to the first Ghost Manor series included Pat Boyette, Steve Ditko, Joe Gill, Sanho Kim, and Mo Marcus. Volume two contributors included Boyette, Ditko, Gill, Vince Alascia, Nicola Cuti, Wayne Howard, Pete Morisi, Don Newton, Charles Nicholas, Enrique Nieto, and Tom Sutton.

With issue #35 (February 1978), Ghost Manor volume two became primarily a reprint title, mostly using material from earlier issues, but also culling stories from Ghostly Tales and other Charlton horror/suspense titles.

Horror comics in general were in decline in the early 1980s, and Charlton in particular was suffering financially. In the fall of 1984, Charlton suspended publication, and Ghost Manor ended its run along with the rest of the company's remaining titles.
