= Frank McLaughlin (artist) =

American comics artist (1935–2020)

- McLaughlin with his wife in 1982
- Born: Francis X. McLaughlin; March 18, 1935 Meriden, Connecticut, U.S.
- Died: March 4, 2020 (aged 84) Milford, Connecticut, U.S.
- Areas: Cartoonist, Artist
- Notable works: Judomaster; Justice League of America

Francis X. McLaughlin (March 18, 1935 – March 4, 2020) was an American comics artist who co-created the comic book character Judomaster, drew the comic strip Gil Thorp, and assisted on such strips as Brenda Starr, Reporter and The Heart of Juliet Jones. He also wrote and illustrated books about cartooning and comic art.

== Biography ==
=== Early life and career ===
McLaughlin was born in Meriden, Connecticut, to Francis and Grace (Daly) McLaughlin, and raised in Stratford, Connecticut. He had three siblings: sister Maureen and brothers James and Michael. Growing up, McLaughlin was inspired by the work of such magazine illustrators as Coby Whitmore, Joe Bowler and Howard Terpning, as well as such earlier illustrators as Gustav Klimt and Alfons Mucha, and such comic-strip artists as Alex Raymond and Milton Caniff.

He studied art at the University of Bridgeport and the New Haven State Teachers College, both in Connecticut. McLaughlin's first professional art job, at "about 17," was drawing belt buckles for a Bridgeport manufacturer's catalog.

After college, McLaughlin, an avid baseball player, went to work for the brake manufacturer Raybestos, where he played for its internationally ranked fast-pitch softball team. After a year there, he was drafted into the U. S. Army, then returned to civilian life as a technical illustrator for Sikorsky Aircraft.

McLaughlin entered the comic book industry in the early 1960s. A college friend recommended him to editor Pat Masulli at Charlton Comics in Derby, Connecticut, who hired McLaughlin as his assistant. "There were no art directors or assistant editors or any other job titles", McLaughlin said in a 2000 interview. "[I did] everything from proofreading to art corrections, lettering titles for [editor] Ernie Hart's books, traffic managing, liaison with the Comics Code, and anything else, including cleaning the storeroom". He did occasional, uncredited inking on late comic books, including on "a couple" of stories by Steve Ditko.

Creator credits were not routinely given in comics during this era, and McLaughlin's earliest known probable credit is inking penciler Dick Giordano on the cover of, and a seven-page story in, Charlton's Battlefield Action #39 (Dec. 1961). McLaughlin's first confirmed credit is full pencil and ink art on the five-page story "And the Light Shall Come" in the same publisher's Reptisaurus #8 (Dec. 1962).

Giordano later became Charlton's editor after, McLaughlin said, he himself had turned down the job: "[Giordano] was a freelancer at the time, and then he hired me to work with him after I got through working at Charlton 9 to 5, and I'd go over to his studio, and then later on, we kind of swapped jobs, because there was a change at Charlton, and I think Pat [Masulli] was moving up, and they offered me his job. I opted to stay freelance and suggested Dick for the job. He became editor and I took over the studio," which artist Jon D'Agostino and writer Joe Gill would soon join.

=== Judomaster ===
McLaughlin, who became Charlton's art director by 1962, worked throughout the Charlton line, including on the superhero titles Blue Beetle, Captain Atom, and Son of Vulcan, the adventure comic The Fightin' 5, the supernatural/science-fiction anthologies Strange Suspense Stories and Mysteries of Unexplored Worlds, and the espionage comic Sarge Steel, where martial artist McLaughlin's backup features, "The Sport of Judo" and "What is Karate?," presaged the original character he would create with writer Joe Gill.

Judomaster's debut: Special War Series #4 (Nov. 1965). The series title is visible diagonally within the red logo box. Cover art by McLaughlin

That character, Judomaster, debuted in Special War Series #4 (Nov. 1965), the final issue of that series, and continued in his own series, beginning with Judomaster #89 (June 1966), taking over the numbering of the defunct Western series Gunmaster. The series, which McLaughlin almost immediately began scripting as well, starred an American soldier in the South Pacific during World War II, who, after saving a native island girl from a Japanese sniper, was taught martial arts by her grateful grandfather. He acquired a costume based on the Japanese military flag, and, in issue #93 (Feb. 1967), a sidekick, Tiger. The series ended at #98 (Dec. 1967), and the character was later purchased by DC Comics in 1983, during Charlton's final years.

=== Marvel and DC ===
Following McLaughlin's final Charlton work, penciling the cover and both penciling and inking the seven-page story "The Living Legend" in the comic strip spin-off comic book The Phantom #30 (Feb. 1969), McLaughlin began to freelance. After a smattering of work that including inking an eight-page teen humor story in DC Comics' Debbi's Dates #10 (Nov. 1970) and a seven-page story in Warren Publishing's black-and-white horror-comics magazine Eerie #34 (July 1971), McLaughlin circa 1971 began assisting comic-strip artist Stan Drake on the naturalistic soap-opera strip The Heart of Juliet Jones. McLaughlin, at Giordano's suggestion, had shown samples of his work to the Westport, Connecticut-based Drake, who hired him to succeed assistant Tex Blaisdell, who had left to draw Little Orphan Annie. "I would pencil and ink just about everything that wasn't a main figure," McLaughlin said.

The following year, McLaughlin began to work steadily for industry leaders DC Comics and Marvel Comics. His first work for the former was inking Win Mortimer on a Zatanna story in Adventure Comics #421 (July 1972), and his first for the latter was inking Jim Mooney on a romance comics story in Our Love Story #18 (Aug. 1972).

Settling into his career as an inker, McLaughlin became ensconced at Marvel, inking the likes of Wayne Boring on Captain Marvel and Sal Buscema on both Captain America and The Defenders before becoming primarily a DC inker. Throughout the 1970s, McLaughlin inked backup stories featuring the Atom, Black Lightning, Zatanna, and "The Fabulous World of Krypton", among others. He became the regular series inker for penciler Dick Dillin's Justice League of America and penciler Irv Novick's The Flash, and for some issues of penciler Ernie Chan's Batman stories in Detective Comics, and Joe Staton's Green Lantern. Concurrently, he wrote martial-arts articles for Marvel's black-and-white comics magazine The Deadly Hands of Kung Fu.

In the 1980s McLaughlin was regular inker on penciler Carmine Infantino's The Flash, Gene Colan's Wonder Woman, and Dan Jurgens' Green Arrow, among other assignments. He also inked Steve Ditko on the first two issues of A.C.E. Comics' short-lived series What Is...The Face? (Dec. 1986 and April 1987), and for the same company wrote, co-penciled and co-inked the single issue of Big Edsel Band (Sept. 1987), starring the modern-day retro-1950s band. During the following decade, while continuing to draw for DC, McLaughlin expanded to Acclaim Comics and Broadway Comics. His last known comics work is Broadway's Fatale #6 (Oct. 1996), inking J. G. Jones.

=== Comic strips ===
Aside from his stint on The Heart of Juliet Jones in the early 1970s, McLaughlin also worked on such comic strips as Brenda Starr, Reporter, assisting Dale Messick; Nancy; and The World's Greatest Superheroes. From 2001, he took over the art for Jack Berrill's Tribune Media comic strip Gil Thorp, drawing the sports feature through 2008.

=== Teacher and author ===
McLaughlin has taught at the Paier College of Art in Hamden, Connecticut, and Guy Gilchrist's Cartoonist's Academy in Simsbury, Connecticut. He co-developed the literacy program "Writing to Read" for the JHM Corporation through Nova University, in which comic-book storytelling was used to teach and encourage reading.

His books include How to Draw Those Bodacious Bad Babes of Comics (Renaissance Books, 2000, ISBN 1-58063-068-5) and How to Draw Monsters for Comics (Renaissance Books, 2001, ISBN 1-58063-069-3), both with Mike Gold.

== Personal life ==
McLaughlin practiced judo from ages 18 to 50, initially studying at Joe Costa's Academy of Judo. He married at age 30, in 1965, living then in Derby, Connecticut, and working in a studio in nearby Ansonia before moving back to his home town of Stratford. As of 2000, he had two grown children: daughter Erin and son Terry. His brother James’ daughter, Anne McLaughlin, is also a professional artist.

McLaughlin died March 4, 2020, age 84, at Milford Hospital in Milford, Connecticut.

== Bibliography ==
=== Archie Comics ===
- Steel Sterling #5 (inks over Charles Nicholas) (1984)

=== Atlas/Seaboard Comics ===
- Planet of Vampires #1–2 (inks over Pat Broderick) (1975)

=== Broadway Comics ===
- Fatale #1–6 (inks over Jeff Jones) (1996)
- Powers That Be #1 (inks over Jeff Jones) (1995)
- Shadow State #1–2 (inks over Dave Cockrum) (1996)

=== Charlton Comics ===
- Blue Beetle #1 (1964)
- Blue Beetle #50 (1965)
- Captain Atom #88–89 (inks over Steve Ditko) (1967)
- Judomaster #89–98 (1966–1967)
- Peter Cannon, Thunderbolt #53 (1966)
- Son of Vulcan #49 (1965)
- Special War Series #4 (1965)

=== DC Comics ===
- Action Comics #434–435 (inks over Dick Dillin); #465, 468 (inks over Curt Swan); #486 (inks over Kurt Schaffenberger); #525, 531 (inks over Joe Staton); #536, 538 (inks over Alex Saviuk) (1974–1982)
- Action Comics Weekly #619–630, 640 (inks over Frank Springer); #636–639 (inks over Louis Williams) (1988–1989)
- Adventure Comics #421 (inks over Win Mortimer); #459–461 (inks over Irv Novick); #463 (inks over Joe Staton); #489 (inks over Carmine Infantino) (1972–1982)
- Armageddon: Inferno #4 (inks over Dick Giordano) (1992)
- Batman #248, 250, 271, 311, 313–318, 326–329, 331–336, 338, 341–342 (inks over Irv Novick); #249 (inks over Bob Brown); #273 (inks over Ernie Chan); #309 (inks over John Calnan); #329 (inks over Rich Buckler); #334 (inks over Joe Staton); #507 (inks over Jim Balent) (1973–1994)
- Batman Family #6 (inks over Irv Novick); #11 (inks over Carl Potts) (1976–1977)
- Batman: Shadow of the Bat #39 (inks over Kevin Walker) (1995)
- The Brave and the Bold #103 (inks over Bob Brown); #146 (inks over Romeo Tanghal) (1972–1979)
- Captain Atom #20 (inks over Pablo Marcos) (1988)
- Danger Trail #1–4 (inks over Carmine Infantino) (1993)
- Date with Debbi #5–6 (inks over L. Stuchkus) (1969)
- DC Challenge #12 (inks over Ross Andru) (1986)
- DC Comics Presents #22, 25 (inks over Dick Dillin); #40, 42, 44, 48 (inks over Irv Novick); #41 (inks over Jose Luis Garcia-Lopez); #51, 57, 64 (inks over Alex Saviuk) (1980–1983)
- DC Special Series #1 (The Flash) (inks over Irv Novick) (1977)
- DC Super Stars #10 (inks over Dick Dillin) (1976)
- Debbi's Dates #10–11 (inks over Alfred O. Williams) (1970)
- Demolition Man #1–4 (movie adaptation) (inks over Rod Whigham) (1993–1994)
- Detective Comics #453 (inks over Sergio Garcia); #460–464 (inks over Ernie Chan); #483 (inks over Dick Dillin); #484 (inks over John Calnan); #485 (inks over Don Newton); #490–491 (inks over Pat Broderick); #598–600 (inks over Denys Cowan) (1975–1989)
- The Flash #215–218, 221–222, 226–227, 229–232, 237–239, 241–249, 252–258, 262–263, 265–270 (inks over Irv Novick); #264 (inks over Kurt Schaffenberger); #277, 325 (inks over Alex Saviuk); #329–350 (inks over Carmine Infantino) (1972–1985)
- The Flash vol. 2 #60–61 (inks over Rod Whigham) (1992)
- Fly #13 (inks over Mike Parobeck) (1992)
- Ghosts #9, 27 (inks over Bob Brown) (1972–1974)
- Green Arrow vol. 2 #2–6, 9–12, 15–16, 19–20, Annual #2 (inks over Ed Hannigan); #13–14, 17–18, 21–24, 27–30, 33–34 (inks over Dan Jurgens); #31–32 (inks over Grant Miehm); #97 (inks over Rodolfo DaMaggio); Annual #6 (inks over Mike Collins)(1988–1995)
- Green Lantern vol. 2 #121, 124–127, 129–130, 152, 166–168, 170 (1979–1983)
- Infinity, Inc. #49 (inks over Vince Argondezzi) (1988)
- The Joker #7 (inks over Irv Novick) (1976)
- Justice League of America #117–152, 154–183 (inks over Dick Dillin); #153 (inks over George Tuska); #184–186 (inks over George Perez); #187–188 (inks over Don Heck); #188–189 (inks over Rich Buckler); #226 (inks over Chuck Patton) (1975–1984)
- Justice Society of America #4, 6 (inks over Tom Artis) (1991)
- Kobra #5 (inks over Rich Buckler) (1976)
- Lobo: A Contract on Gawd #3–4 (inks over Kieron Dwyer) (1994)
- Ms. Tree Quarterly #8 (inks over Carmine Infantino) (1992)
- New Adventures of Superboy #24 (inks over John Calnan); #41–43 (inks over Howard Bender) (1981–1983)
- New Gods vol. 3 #26, 28 (inks over Rick Hoberg) (1991)
- Red Tornado #1–4 (inks over Carmine Infantino) (1985)
- Robin vol. 4 #15 (inks over Tom Grummett); #16 (inks over Stewart Johnson); Annual #2 (inks over Kieron Dwyer) (1993–1995)
- Secret Origins Annual #2 (inks over Mike Collins) (1988)
- The Shadow #9 (inks over Frank Robbins) (1975)
- Strange Sports Stories #5 (inks over Irv Novick) (1974)
- Superman #263 (inks over Dick Dillin); #275 (inks over Curt Swan); #369 (inks over Rich Buckler); #370 (inks over Kurt Schaffenberger) (1973–1982)
- The Superman Family #195 (inks over Kurt Schaffenberger); #196 (inks over Bob Oksner); #212 (inks over Jose Delbo); #215 (inks over John Calnan) (1979–1982)
- Superman IV Movie Special #1 (inks) (1987)
- Tales of the Green Lantern Corps #1–3 (inks over Joe Staton) (1981)
- Teen Titans Spotlight #5–6 (inks over Ross Andru) (1986–1987)
- War of the Gods #4 (inks over George Perez) (1991)
- Weird War Tales #59 (inks over Romeo Tanghal) (1978)
- Wonder Woman #291–305 (inks over Gene Colan); #298–299 (Huntress) (inks over Joe Staton) (1982–1983)
- Wonder Woman vol. 2 #19 (inks over George Perez); #68 (inks over Paris Cullins) (1988–1992)
- World of Metropolis #1 (inks over Win Mortimer) (1988)
- World's Finest Comics #257 (inks over Dick Dillin); #257 269, 271, 275 (inks over Rich Buckler); #282 (inks over Irv Novick); #283 (inks over George Tuska); #295 (inks over Jerome Moore); #300 (inks) (1979–1984)

=== Marvel Comics ===
- Adventure into Fear #15 (inks over Val Mayerik) (1973)
- Amazing Adventures #16 (inks over Bob Brown and Marie Severin); #19 (inks over Howard Chaykin) (1973)
- The Avengers #109 (inks over Don Heck) (1973)
- Captain America #155–156, 160, 165–166, 169 (inks over Sal Buscema); #259, 261–264 (inks over Mike Zeck); #260 (inks over Alan Kupperberg) (1972–1981)
- Captain Marvel #23 (inks over Wayne Boring) (1972)
- Cat #4 (inks over Jim Starlin and Alan Weiss) (1973)
- Chamber of Chills #6 (inks over Wayne Muramoto) (1973)
- Creatures on the Loose #34–36 (inks over George Perez) (1975)
- Dazzler #6–7 (inks over Frank Springer) (1981)
- Deadly Hands of Kung Fu #10, Special #1 (full art); #3 (inks over Dick Giordano) (1974–1975)
- Defenders #4–6, 8–9 (inks over Sal Buscema) (1973)
- Giant-Size Dracula #2 (inks over Don Heck) (1974)
- Hero for Hire #16 (inks over Billy Graham) (1973)
- Our Love Story #18 (inks over Jim Mooney) (1972)

=== Spotlight Comics ===
- Mighty Mouse #1 (inks over Doug Cushman); #2 (inks over Win Mortimer) (1987)
- Mighty Mouse and Friends Holiday Special #1 (inks over Rusty Haller) (1987)

=== Valiant Comics ===
- H.A.R.D. Corps #23 (inks over Jordi Ensign) (1994)

=== Warren ===
- Eerie #34 (inks over Ernie Colon) (1971)

Preceded by Dick Giordano	Justice League of America inker 1975–1981	Succeeded by Bob Smith
Preceded by Dick Giordano	Batman inker 1979–1981	Succeeded by Klaus Janson
Preceded by Ray Burns	Gil Thorp artist 2001–2008	Succeeded by Frank Bolle
