= Ghostly Haunts =

American horror-suspense anthology comic book series

- Ghostly Haunts #20 (Sept. 1971), art by Jean Elier.

Publication information
- Publisher: Charlton Comics
- Schedule: Bimonthly
- Format: Anthology
- Genre: Horror
- Publication date: Sept. 1971-Apr. 1978
- No. of issues: 39
- Main character: Winnie the Witch
- Editor(s): Sal Gentile, George Wildman

Ghostly Haunts is an American horror-suspense anthology comic book series that was published by Charlton Comics from 1971 to 1978. The book was "hosted" by Winnie the Witch, a "moddish" blue-skinned witch.

Ghostly Haunts was part of a wave of new horror and suspense comics published by Charlton during this period. Its sister titles, with many of the same creators, were the Charlton anthologies The Many Ghosts of Doctor Graves (with host Dr. M. T. Graves), Ghostly Tales (with host Mr. L. Dedd, later I. M. Dedd), Ghost Manor (with host Mr. Bones), Haunted (with hosts Impy and then Baron Weirwulf), and Scary Tales (with host Countess R. H. Von Bludd).

Although Charlton's low page-rates and slapdash production values typically resulted in few notable characters or stories, Ghostly Haunts featured some memorable stories in the old EC Comics vein, especially in its later issues; one theory for this being that the Charlton line was so obscure that it often evaded the eye of the Comics Code Authority censors.

== Publication history ==
Ghostly Haunts debuted with issue #20, taking over the numbering of Ghost Manor volume one. Ghostly Haunts was published bimonthly; it went on a publishing hiatus between issues #53 and #54, which lasted from January to August 1977. Charlton's horror titles all went on hiatus during this period; Ghostly Haunts was cancelled shortly thereafter, with its April 1978 issue, #58, being the final one published. Altogether, Ghostly Haunts published 39 issues.

Regular contributors to Ghostly Haunts included Jack Abel, Vince Alascia, Pat Boyette, Nicola Cuti, Steve Ditko, Joe Gill, Fred Himes, Wayne Howard, Sanho Kim, Rich Larson, Pete Morisi, Steve Morisi, Don Newton, Charles Nicholas, Don Perlin, Warren Sattler, Joe Staton, and Tom Sutton. Ghostly Haunts was primarily edited by George Wildman, who took over the title from Sal Gentile with issue #26 (August 1972), and helmed the book for the rest of its run.
