= Haunted (comics) =

- Haunted #1 (Sept. 1971), art by Steve Ditko.

Publication information
- Publisher: Charlton Comics
- Schedule: Bimonthly
- Format: anthology
- Genre: Horror
- Publication date: Sept. 1971-Sept. 1984
- No. of issues: 75
- Main character(s): Impy; Baron Weirwulf

Creative team
- Written by: Pat Boyette, Nicola Cuti, Steve Ditko, Joe Gill, Pete Morisi, Joe Staton, Tom Sutton
- Artist(s): Jack Abel, Vince Alascia, Pat Boyette, Nicola Cuti, Steve Ditko, Wayne Howard, Pete Morisi, Don Newton, Charles Nicholas, Enrique Nieto, Joe Staton, Tom Sutton, Tony Tallarico
- Editor(s): Sal Gentile, George Wildman

Haunted is a horror-suspense anthology comic book series that was published by Charlton Comics from 1971 to 1984 (though it was primarily a reprint title from 1978 onward). The book was "hosted" by Impy, a pint-sized ghost dressed in an all-white superhero costume. With issue #21, the book's host became Baron Weirwulf (who first appeared in Ghost Manor #19, published in July 1974). From that point forward, Haunted's title was changed to Baron Weirwulf's Haunted Library (though it was still known as Haunted in the indicia).

Haunted was part of a wave of new horror and suspense comics published by Charlton during this period. Its sister titles, with many of the same creators, were the Charlton anthologies The Many Ghosts of Doctor Graves (with host Dr. M. T. Graves), Ghostly Tales (with host Mr. L. Dedd, later I. M. Dedd), Ghost Manor (with host Mr. Bones), Ghostly Haunts (with host Winnie the Witch), and Scary Tales (with host Countess R. H. Von Bludd).

== Publication history ==
Haunted was published bimonthly; with issue #35 (April 1978), it became primarily a reprint title, republishing material from its own archives as well as those of its sister titles (even covers from the latter years of Haunted were often taken from interior art from the reprinted stories). Haunted went on a publishing hiatus between issues #15 and #16, which lasted from November 1973 to June 1974; suffered another hiatus between issues #31 and #32 (January–October 1977); and underwent a final hiatus between issues #51 and #52 (October 1980–December 1981). Altogether, Haunted published 75 issues — with only the first 34 being primarily original material.

Regular contributors to Haunted included Jack Abel, Vince Alascia, Pat Boyette, Nicola Cuti, Steve Ditko, Joe Gill, Wayne Howard, Pete Morisi, Don Newton, Charles Nicholas, Enrique Nieto, Joe Staton, Tom Sutton, and Tony Tallarico (as Tony Williamsune). Haunted was primarily edited by George Wildman, who took over the title from Sal Gentile with issue #8 (October 1972), and helmed the book until its cancellation with issue #75 (Sept. 1984).

American horror comics in general were in decline in the early 1980s, and Charlton in particular was suffering financially. In the fall of 1984, Charlton suspended publication, and Haunted ended its run along with the rest of the company's remaining titles.
