= Sanho Kim =

South Korean comic book artist

- Born: Kim Sanho; 1939 (age 86–87)
- Areas: Cartoonist, Writer, Artist, Letterer
- Notable works: Lifi; Ghost Manor; House of Yang
- Awards: Order of Cultural Merit, 2008

- Sanho Kim
- Hangul: 김산호
- RR: Gim Sanho
- MR: Kim Sanho

Sanho Kim (born 1939 in Korea) is a South Korean comic book artist, considered the first artist working in a manhwa style to be published regularly in the United States. The bulk of Kim's American work was for Charlton Comics' horror comics, as well as the Kung fu title House of Yang.

In South Korea, Kim is known for the bestselling title Lifi, as well as his more recent History of Great Korean Empire. Lifi encouraged the Korean people to rise from the destruction of the Korean War, and is still imprinted in the minds of many people as Korea's first science fiction comic. Though Kim has worked in many styles and genres, the common theme that runs through his work is the pride and spirit of the Korean people.

== Biography ==
=== Early life and education ===
While a child during the Korean War, Kim lived in a refugee camp, where he read the comic strip "Mr. Manhong," featured in a Busan newspaper. Inspired to become a cartoonist himself, Kim studied fine arts (including Western painting) at Seorabeol Art College in Seoul.

While still at university, Kim made his professional debut in Manhwa Segye Magazine with "A Shining Star at Dawn," a well-received story about fighters for Korean independence from Japan. Kim released his first full-length book, The Brilliant Twilight Star, in 1958.

=== Lifi and other Korean comics ===
In 1959, Kim published the science fiction bestseller Lifi the Fighter of Justice, set in the 22nd century. Published during a post-war period of great economic distress, Kim used his hero to express the spirit of the Korean people and to urge his readers to overcome their hardships. With a "ㄹ"-shaped badge on the chest (based on the Taebaek Mountains), and armed with futuristic weapons, Lifi fought against crowds of devils. Despite comics being dismissed as a lowly genre, Lifi was a huge success and his image was ubiquitous throughout the country.

From 1961 to 1967, Kim published the long-running series Rhye Pye (a.k.a. Frieple). He drew comics in several genres, including adventure, police, and war stories.

=== United States ===
In 1966, Kim moved to the United States, setting up a publishing house and working as an art director at the magazines Off Broadway and Village Times.

By 1969, Kim had connected with the American comic book industry, eventually garnering over 300 credits during the period 1969–1976. The bulk of Kim's output during this time was for Charlton Comics, but he also worked for Warren Publishing, Skywald Publications, and Marvel Comics. With his Korean-informed style, Kim became the first manhwa artist working to be published regularly in the United States.

==== Charlton ====
For Charlton, Kim worked on a number of the company's horror and suspense titles, particularly The Many Ghosts of Doctor Graves, Ghost Manor, Ghostly Haunts, Ghostly Tales, and Haunted. (In addition to providing artwork for many interior stories, Kim drew most of the covers for Ghost Manor vol. 1.) He also illustrated stories for the Charlton Western comics Billy the Kid and Cheyenne Kid, and the war comic War.

Kim's most important and artistically successful effort was for House of Yang (1975–1976), a spinoff of the Charlton title Yang, which ran from 1973 to 1976. The Yang titles were intended to capitalize on the mid-1970s Kung Fu craze in general and the television show Kung Fu in particular. House of Yang was set in Asia, which perfectly suited Kim's background and style. Kim had been slated to design and illustrate the original series, which he had titled Wrong Country, but the artwork was misplaced and Charlton regulars Joe Gill and Warren Sattler filled in for the duration of Yang's run. (The lost artwork for Wrong Country later turned up and was printed the CPL Gang fanzine Charlton Bullseye.)

Other Charlton titles Kim contributed to, though in a more sporadic fashion, included Beyond the Grave, Bounty Hunter, Fightin' Army, Fightin' Marines, Haunted Love, Scary Tales, Space Adventures, and Sword & Sorcery. During the period 1969–1976, Kim did over 60 covers for Charlton titles as well as interior lettering.

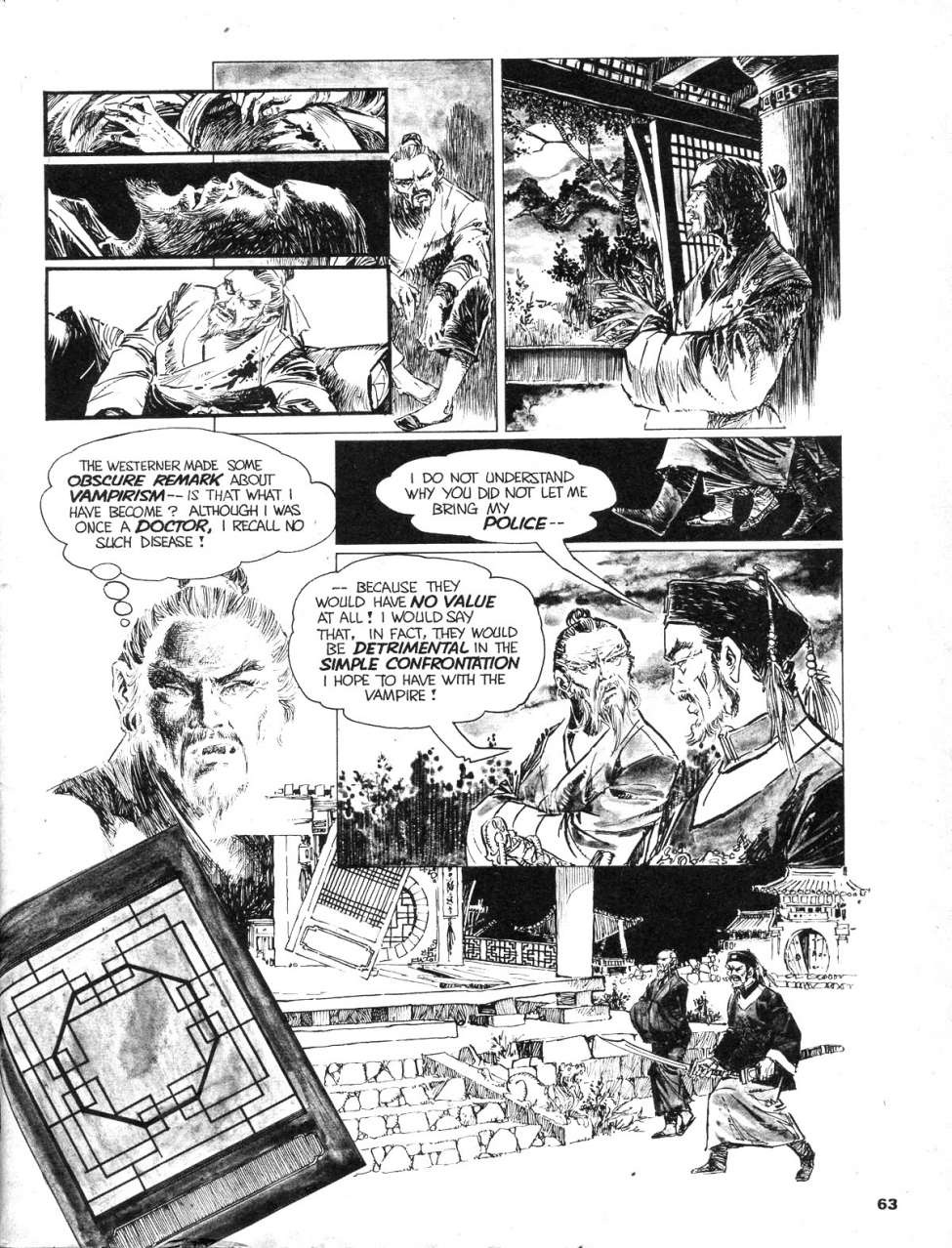
Psycho #24 (March 1975), Skywald Publications, art by Sanho Kim

==== Other U.S. publishers ====
While working for Charlton, Kim freelanced for Warren Publishing, crafting a backup feature in Vampirella and contributing to Eerie in 1971–1972. Kim illustrated The Sword and the Maiden (vol. 1 of Sword's Edge), which was written by Michael Juliar and published by Iron Horse Publishing in 1973. For Skywald Publications from 1974 to 1976, Kim did the art for The Fiend of Changsha and Horror. Benefiting from the notoriety of his Asian-themed work for Charlton, Kim moved to Marvel Comics in 1975, contributing stories to the black-and-white comics magazines Deadly Hands of Kung Fu and Monsters Unleashed.

=== Return to Korea ===
In the early 1990s Kim traveled to China, where he came to believe that six thousand years earlier, ancient Koreans had governed broad areas of that country, including the Shandong Peninsula and Manchuria. Following his visit to China, Kim changed the focus of his comics to historical topics, including Daejusinjeguksa (History of Great Korean Empire). In this project, as well as The Duman River and The Story of Buddha, Kim has combined Western painting with comics art, in his words inventing a new form of "picture scenario" to tell his stories.

Kim returned to South Korea in 1996. In October 2008, he was awarded the Order of Cultural Merit by the South Korean government.

== Bibliography ==
- "A Shining Star at Dawn" (Manhwa Segye Magazine, pre-1958)
- The Brilliant Twilight Star (1958)
- Lifi the Fighter of Justice (1959)
- Rhye Pye (a.k.a. Frieple) (1961–1967) – long-running series written and illustrated by Kim.
- Charlton Comics (1969–1976) – also other U.S. publishers, including Warren and Marvel
- The Sword and the Maiden (Iron Horse Publishing, 1973) ISBN 0-914380-00-1 – vol. 1 of Sword's Edge. Co-written with Michael Juliar.
- Ploto – series about a Korean refugee from the Japanese Occupation, coming to the United States via Shanghai. Ploto uses Taekwondo to punish villains in the name of justice.
- Ghost Story – the "han" sentiment of a Korean ghost who wears the traditional Korean "chima and jogori" (skirt and coat) costume. The series also deals with the customs and emotions of the people of the Joseon period as they are invaded by Japan. Written in English.
- Daejusinjeguksa (History of Great Korean Empire) (Ch'ulp'ansa, 3 volumes, 1994)
- The Duman River
- The Story of Buddha
- Deadly Hands of Kung Fu Omnibus Vol. 1, November 15, 2016, ISBN 978-1302901332
- Deadly Hands of Kung Fu Omnibus Vol. 2, June, 2017, ISBN 978-1302-901349

== Sources ==
- Sanho Kim at the Comic Book DB (archived from the original)
- Kim entry, Who's Who of American Comic Books, 1928–1999. Accessed June 9, 2011.
