= Billy the Kid (Charlton Comics) =

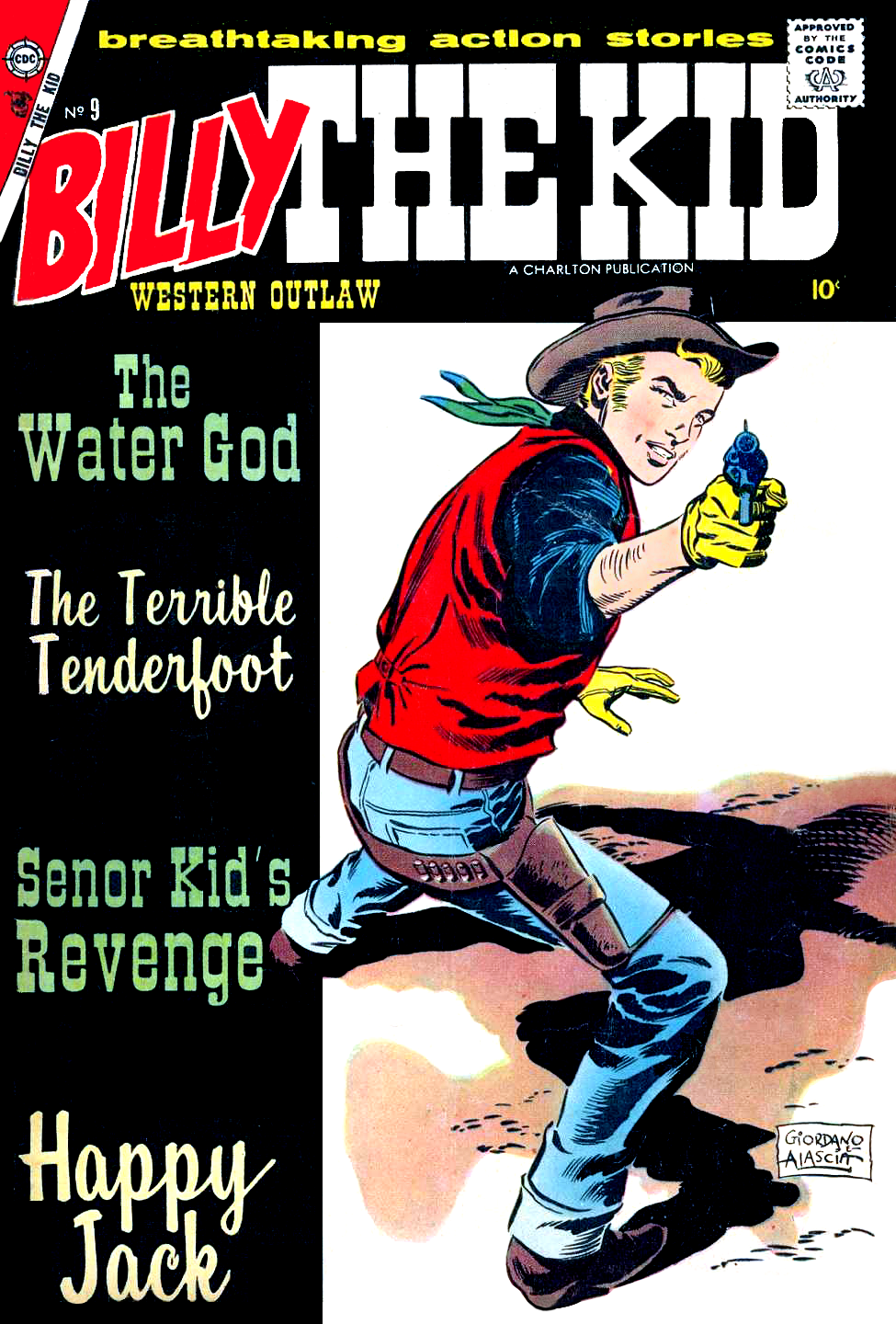
- Billy the Kid #9 (Nov. 1957). Cover art by Dick Giordano and Vince Alascia.

Publication information
- Publisher: Charlton Comics
- First appearance: Masked Raider #6 (Feb. 1957)

In-story information
- Alter ego: William Bonney
Billy the Kid
Publication information
- Schedule: Bimonthly
- Format: Ongoing series
- Genre: Western
- Publication date: Nov. 1957 – Mar. 1983
- No. of issues: 145
- Main character(s): Billy the Kid, the Cheyenne Kid, Bounty Hunter (Shawn O'Meara), Doc Holliday, Tenderfoot Sheriff John Lind, Mr. Young of The Boothill Gazette, Apache Red
Creative team
- Written by: Joe Gill
- Artist(s): Pat Boyette, José Delbo, Jack Keller, Sanho Kim, Rocke Mastroserio, Charles Nicholas, Warren Sattler, Carl Wessler
- Editor(s): Pat Masulli (c. 1957–1967); George Wildman (c. 1972–1983)

Billy the Kid is a Western comic book series published by Charlton Comics, with stories of a fictional character based on the historical Billy the Kid. Taking over the numbering of a previous Western comic, Masked Raider, Billy the Kid was published from issues #9-153 (Nov. 1957 - March 1983). The Billy the Kid character made his first appearance in Masked Raider #6.

Regular backup features in the book included Bounty Hunter Shawn O'Meara, Tenderfoot Sheriff John Lind, Mr. Young Of The Boothill Gazette, and Apache Red.

Regular contributors to the title included writer Joe Gill, and artists Pat Boyette, José Delbo, Jack Keller, Sanho Kim, Rocke Mastroserio, Charles Nicholas, Warren Sattler, and Carl Wessler.

== Publication history ==
The book's first five issues (June 1955 - Aug. 1956) were titled Masked Raider (not to be confused with the Timely Comics character), starring a masked gunfighter and his pet golden eagle Talon. With issue #6 the book was titled Masked Raider Presents Billy the Kid. This title lasted three issues, through cover-date July 1957. With issue #9, the full cover title was Billy the Kid: Western Outlaw, lasting through issue #37.

Billy the Kid was twice put under publication hiatus, first between #121 and #122 (Jan.–Aug. 1977), and then from #123 to #124 (Nov. 1977–Feb. 1978). From that point the end of the run, Billy the Kid was a reprint title.

== Recurring features ==
- The Cheyenne Kid made appearances in issues #19, 117, 118, 127-129, 134, 135, and 138-141.
- Bounty Hunter (Shawn O'Meara) stories were featured in issues #66-78, 80, 81, 83, and 87.
- Fictional Doc Holliday stories appeared in issues #68, 77, and 86.
- Tenderfoot Sheriff John Lind appeared in issues #73, 85, 90, 93, 147, and 152.
- Mr. Young of The Boothill Gazette stories were featured in issues #88-98, 100, 102, and 104-110.
- Apache Red stories appeared in issues #112, 114-116, and 119-123.
