= The Weird Ones =

1962 American film

- Film poster
- Directed by: Pat Boyette
- Release date: February 1962 (San Antonio)
- Language: English

The Weird Ones is a 1962 American sci-fi horror sexploitation comedy film directed by Pat Boyette. The film, also known as The Weird One, is now considered to be lost.

== Premise ==
According to Brian Albright in Regional Horror Films, quoting the AFI catalogue, the film was about an alien creature, the Astronik, coming to Earth and terrorising and killing women. Two press agents specialized in erotica use the services of a female alien, referred to as the Cosmo-Cutie, to lure the monster and capture him.

== Production and loss ==
The film was directed, written and produced by Boyette. A low-budget production, the film was shot in and around San Antonio as most of Boyette's films.

All copies of this 76-minute film and promotional materials are said to have been destroyed in a garage fire in San Antonio. Only some theatrical and promotional posters have survived.

== Release ==
The film premiered in San Antonio in February 1962.

== Reception ==
Despite the loss of the film, TV Guide described it as "A feature that is just too brainless to be reckoned with".

== Bibliography ==
- Frank T. Thompson, Texas Hollywood: Filmmaking in San Antonio Since 1910 (2002, Indiana University), pp. 44–46 ( "The Idiosyncratic Pat Boyette"); p. 71.

== See also ==
- Dungeons of Horror, horror film directed by Boyette, released in 1964
- No Man's land, a 1964 drama film, set during the Korean War, released under the name of the lead actor but very likely produced/directed by Boyette
