= House of Yang =

House of Yang may refer to:

- Sui dynasty (581–618), a Chinese dynasty ruled by a Yang family
- Yang Wu (907–937), a dynasty in eastern China during the Five Dynasties and Ten Kingdoms period
- Chiefdom of Bozhou (876–1600), an autonomous polity in modern Guizhou, China, ruled by a Yang family
- Chiefdom of Kokang (1739–1959), an autonomous polity in modern Shan State, Myanmar, ruled by a Yang family from China
- House of Yang (comics), see Sanho Kim

== See also ==
- Generals of the Yang Family, a Chinese legend
