= Wayne Howard =

American comic artist (1949–2007)

- Born: Wayne Wright Howard; March 29, 1949 Cleveland, Ohio, U.S.
- Died: December 9, 2007 (aged 58) Derby, Connecticut, U.S.
- Areas: Penciller, Inker
- Notable works: Midnight Tales (Charlton Comics)
- Spouse: Carol (Zavednak) Howard

Wayne Wright Howard (March 29, 1949 – December 9, 2007) was an American comic book artist. He is best known for his 1970s work at Charlton Comics. Although many other artists had signed their cover artwork, he became American comic books' first series creator known to be credited by the publisher on covers, with the horror anthology Midnight Tales announcing "Created by Wayne Howard" on each issue — "a declaration perhaps unique in the industry at the time".

== Biography ==
Midnight Tales #6 (Nov. 1973), with industry-first cover credit "Created by Wayne Howard" (lower left). Cover art by Howard.

=== Early life and career ===
Wayne Howard was born in Cleveland, Ohio, the son of Sherman and nurse June (Monroe) Howard. Drawing since childhood, he had his first professional job in comics while in high school, illustrating public-service pamphlets put out by the city of Cleveland, "stuff like how to keep rats out of your trash cans." He attended Wesleyan University in Middletown, Connecticut, where he earned a Bachelor of Arts degree, class of 1971. Howard contributed to comics fanzines in the mid-1960s, and had a poem published in Fantastic Four #22 (Jan. 1964), for which the editor jocularly declared him "Poet Laureate of Yancy Street". He went on to become an art assistant at the Long Island, New York, studio of influential comics artist Wally Wood circa 1969.

Howard made his credited comics debut as a penciler and inker with writer Marv Wolfman's three-page story "Cain's True Case Files: Grave Results" in DC Comics' House of Mystery #182 (Oct. 1969). He contributed to later issues, as well as to Major Publications' black-and-white horror-comics magazine Web of Horror #1 (Dec. 1969).

=== Charlton Comics ===
The story "Growth", in Web of Horror #1, marked his first collaboration with Nicola Cuti, a writer and eventual friend who soon afterward became managing editor of Charlton Comics, a Derby, Connecticut, publisher whose comic-book line was traditionally low-paying but allowed its writers and artists great creative freedom. Howard began freelancing for Charlton with the story "A Winner's Curse" in the horror anthology Ghost Manor #4 (April 1972). Over the next five years, up through the cover and two stories of Haunted #32 (Oct. 1977), Howard, with a style strongly reminiscent of his mentor Wood, penciled / inked roughly 200 covers and stories — primarily for such supernatural series as the aforementioned and Ghostly Haunts, Ghostly Tales, The Many Ghosts of Doctor Graves, and an issue each of Beyond the Grave and Creepy Things, and of the gothic horror romance anthology Haunted Love. With writer Cuti, he contributed the backup feature "Travis: The Dragon Killer" in the cult-hit superhero series E-Man #3 (June 1974).

==== Midnight Tales ====
Howard's most notable legacy is providing the precedent for comic-book "created by" credits, which became common years later beginning with DC's Vertigo imprint.

Charlton writer-editor Cuti described Howard's credit for the horror anthology Midnight Tales being granted since "it was his idea, his concept, his everything". This ranged from horror host Professor Coffin (the Midnight Philosopher) and his niece, Arachne — who in a twist on the horror-host convention would themselves star in a story each issue — to the notion of having each issue be themed: "One time it would be blob monsters, and I wrote three stories about blob monsters, and another time it was vampires ... and that sort of thing". Howard penciled and inked every cover and virtually every story, and occasionally scripted a tale. The three-issue reprint series Professor Coffin #19-21 (Oct. 1985 – Feb. 1986) retains the "created by" credit.

The critic Mark Andrew observed of Midnight Tales,

Old dude and his sexy niece traipse across the countryside, bumping into oddball characters who invariably have a story to tell. ... Sadly, since Charlton didn't want to do anything that'd offend your average 9-year-old, you can feel this book fighting against the uber-restrictive comics code. Kinda sad, really. What is good, however, are the artists in this book, easily the equal of anyone workin' at Marvel or DC at the time. You got Wayne Howard ... probably the most deft practitioner of the Wally Wood school ever.

=== Other work and later career ===
Howard seldom ventured to other publishers. He penciled a story in Gold Key's TV series tie-in The Twilight Zone #46 (Nov. 1972), and inked one story each for Warren Publishing's black-and-white magazines Creepy and Eerie. He inked the horror-host pages of DC's House of Mystery #256-257 (Feb.-April 1978) plus a story each in Weird War Tales #53 (May 1977) and Secrets of Haunted House #13 (Sept. 1978), and the sword-and-sorcery title Warlord #64 (Dec. 1982), his last known original comics work. His only major-publisher penciling was a story in DC's Weird Mystery Tales #4 (Feb. 1973).

For the industry leader Marvel Comics, he inked Rich Buckler's cover and Ross Andru's pencil art adapting Harry Bates' short story "Farewell to the Master" in the science-fiction anthology Worlds Unknown #3 (Sept. 1973); Gil Kane's Spider-Man / Sub-Mariner story in Marvel Team-Up #14 (Oct. 1973); Val Mayerik's "Thongor! Warrior of Lost Lemuria" feature in Creatures on the Loose #26 (Nov. 1973); and a Syd Shores story in the black-and-white comics magazine Haunt of Horror #4 (Nov. 1974).

== Personal life ==
Howard died at age 58 at the Griffin Hospital in Derby, Connecticut. He lived in Oxford, Connecticut, at the time, married to Carol (Zavednak) Howard.

George Wildman, Charlton Comics' editor during the 1970s, described the artist as, "sort of shy. Easy come, easy go", and said Howard had married the sister of one of Wildman's early secretaries. Howard's friend and frequent collaborator Nicola Cuti said the artist, a heavy smoker, "always wore the same outfit: a white shirt, a kind of tan bush jacket, black hat, black pants and black tie. ...I was over at his apartment, and he opened up his closet, and there were 20 white shirts, 20 bush jackets, 20 black pants...." The magazine Comic Book Artist in 2001 attempted to contact Howard for an issue devoted to Charlton Comics, and reported that while he "apparently still resides in Connecticut ... a third party indicated the artist/writer had no interest in delving into the past".

== See also ==
- List of African-American firsts
