= Don Newton =

American comics artist (1934–1984)

- Newton self-portrait.
- Born: November 6, 1934 St. Charles, Virginia, U.S.
- Died: August 19, 1984 (aged 49) Phoenix, Arizona, U.S.
- Areas: Penciller, Inker
- Notable works: Aquaman; Batman; Detective Comics; New Gods
- Awards: Comic Fan Art Award 1973

Donald Lee Newton (November 12, 1934 – August 19, 1984) was an American comics artist. During his career, he worked for a number of comic book publishers including Charlton Comics, DC Comics, and Marvel Comics. He is best known for his work on The Phantom, Aquaman, and Batman. Newton also drew several Captain Marvel/Marvel Family stories and was a fan of the character having studied under Captain Marvel co-creator C. C. Beck.

== Biography ==
Newton was born in St. Charles, Virginia, but after being diagnosed with asthma at the age of four, the Newton family moved to Arizona. Newton began drawing at a young age, with comic books being a major influence on his early artwork. He was a big fan of Batman, Daredevil, and Captain Marvel.

By the mid–1960s, Newton was teaching art in Phoenix and worked part-time as a student art reviewer for the mail order "Master Artist's Painting Course."

=== Comics fandom ===
Newton eventually discovered comic book fandom, while searching for a source to purchase old comics. Newton became involved with the Science Fiction and Comics Association (SFCA) and became an artistic staple in the organization's publications. Between 1968 and 1973 he produced almost two dozen covers for the Rocket's Blast Comicollector (RBCC). Newton did not limit himself exclusively to the publications of the SFCA; he also worked for most of the major fanzines during these years. In all Newton’s work appeared in over one hundred fanzines.

Newton did one major strip during this time which ran for more than a year in the RBCC, called "The Savage Earth". From 1968 to 1970, the science fiction strip appeared in issues #60–70 of the RBCC. Issue #65 of the RBCC sported a Newton "Savage Earth" painting as its cover.

Newton tried for years to leverage his connections in fandom into work at DC Comics or Marvel Comics, but he was at a distinct disadvantage living in Arizona. Marvel in particular wanted their artists close at hand. Newton finally set his sights a little lower and sent some sample pages to Nicola Cuti at Charlton Comics where his first professional comic book work was published.

=== Charlton Comics ===
Newton's first work for Charlton appeared in Ghost Manor #18 (May 1974) and would work on Charlton horror books for the next year and half. Besides drawing for the Charlton horror comics, Newton also began painting covers for their horror and romance books.

Don Newton's cover to The Phantom #74 (Jan. 1977) featuring the Phantom of 1776

In October 1975 Newton's first issue of The Phantom, #67, was published. Newton would pencil and ink all of his Phantom work and would supply a cover painting for every issue he drew. Newton’s short run on the book featured two classic Newton pieces at Charlton. Issue #70 of The Phantom stars Humphrey Bogart, Lauren Bacall, Sydney Greenstreet, Peter Lorre, and Claude Rains and is a mixture of Casablanca, The African Queen, The Maltese Falcon, and The Treasure of the Sierra Madre.

Newton’s final issue of The Phantom features the Phantom of 1776 meeting Benjamin Franklin. It has a Phantom cover, the Phantom of 1776, sword in one hand, flintlock pistol in the other in front of a smoky background of the Declaration of Independence and a tattered 13-star American flag.

=== After Charlton ===
Newton had always seen Charlton as a stepping-stone to Marvel Comics. While still working for Charlton, Newton worked on an issue of Giant-Size Defenders, did some small uncredited inking on a few issues of the Deadly Hands of Kung Fu magazine over Mike Vosburg's penciled artwork, a frontispiece for the Savage Sword of Conan, and a single painting for Roy Thomas which years later became a cover for Thomas' magazine Alter Ego. Newton inked an issue of Ghost Rider over Don Heck's pencils and produced a cover for Marvel's Unknown Worlds of Science Fiction Annual.

=== DC Comics ===
Newton began his career at DC with DC Special #28 (July 1977). Newton contributed the pencils on an Aquaman strip inked by his old friend Dan Adkins. Newton would draw Aquaman off and on for the next three years. That same month saw the release of Newton's first series at DC, The New Gods #12. Dan Adkins inked most of his work on the New Gods. It was during his tenure on this strip that Newton left his job as a junior high school art teacher to work full-time as an artist. In the middle of Newton's run on The New Gods, he and David Michelinie co-created the Star Hunters for DC but Newton dropped the feature after drawing two stories.

One of Newton’s lifelong ambitions was to draw Captain Marvel and he fulfilled this desire in 1978 when he was signed as the new penciller for the Shazam! title. He would draw this strip in its own title, as well as in World's Finest Comics and Adventure Comics until October 1982.

Newton began drawing the Batman character beginning with Batman #305 (November 1978), and would draw 79 stories featuring Batman or members of the Batman family during his tenure at DC. Newton and writer Dennis O'Neil co-created Maxie Zeus, who first appeared in Detective Comics #483 (April–May 1979). O'Neil and Newton produced the story "The Vengeance Vow" in Detective Comics #485 (Aug.–Sept. 1979) in which the original Batwoman is killed by the League of Assassins.

=== Marvel Comics ===
In 1979, Newton returned to Marvel. He wanted to draw Captain America, but that title was unavailable at the time and The Avengers was the closest Marvel could do to fulfilling that request. Newton took the assignment when he was promised Joe Rubinstein as his permanent inker on the book. Newton finished the pencils for only two issues before returning to DC. Those two issues of The Avengers became Avengers Annual #9, half of which was inked by Rubinstein, half by Jack Abel. In 1981 Don Newton again left DC for Marvel. As was the case the first time, better money was one of the factors that pushed him to Marvel. Marvel had other artists, such as Val Mayerik, call Don to entice him into working at Marvel again. Unlike the previous time, Joe Rubinstein was not part of the deal. The Avengers #204 (Feb. 1981) featured inks by Dan Green.

=== DC again ===
During the time that Newton was drawing this second attempt at The Avengers book, he was contacted by Paul Levitz who promised him some additional advertising artwork, should Newton return to DC. After the Avengers inking by Dan Green (which he had been unsatisfied with) and again the lack of scheduled work from Marvel, Newton agreed to accept a new contract with DC.

Newton did two issues of Green Lantern in 1982. Both were Green Lantern Corps stories, one of which contained the first appearance of Ch'p, a squirrel-like Green Lantern. Two years later Newton returned to Green Lantern in the only DC comics work he inked. In Newton’s obituary, Dick Giordano said of this work, "To my mind, Don's final statement was the Green Lantern Corps story he penciled and inked that appeared in Green Lantern #181. He showed us how to do it right."

He drew the first appearance of Jason Todd in Batman #357 (March 1983), a character who became the second Robin.

Newton had always told DC that the only series he would like to draw other than Batman and Captain Marvel was All-Star Squadron. Editor and writer Roy Thomas tapped into that interest by proposing that Newton draw Infinity, Inc., featuring the children of the original All-Star characters. The first issue scheduled to contain Newton's art was Infinity Inc. #11 featuring a five-page framing sequence by Newton which surrounded a story drawn by George Tuska and Mike Machlan. Newton was to begin penciling the entire book with issue #12, but the letters page in issue #11 told of Newton's death. Newton suffered a massive heart attack in his home, after dealing with months of a debilitating throat ailment. He died three days later on August 19, 1984, in a nearby Mesa hospital.

While Newton was in the hospital in a coma, the first three pages of Infinity Inc. #12 were sent to Thomas. Rubinstein was brought in to ink them and Newton’s Phoenix friend John Clark lettered the pages at Thomas' request. As a final tribute to Newton, Marvel editor Jim Shooter let Rubinstein out of his contract for a month so that he could ink a fill-in issue Newton had done. It became Infinity Inc. #13 (April 1985), which was Newton's last published original work.

In 2011, DC published Tales of the Batman: Don Newton, a hardcover collection of Newton's Batman stories.

=== Death ===
Newton died on August 19, 1984, after suffering a massive heart attack.

== Awards ==
Newton won the Comic Fan Art Award in 1973 in the category "Favorite Fan Artist".

== Bibliography ==
Comics work (interior pencil art) includes:

=== Charlton Comics ===
- Beyond the Grave #17 (1984)
- Ghost Manor #18, 20, 22, 48, 64 (1974–1982)
- Ghostly Haunts #42 (1975)
- Haunted #50, 59 (1980–1982)
- Many Ghosts of Dr. Graves #45, 49 (1974–1975)
- Midnight Tales #11–14 (1975)
- The Phantom #67–68, 70–71, 73–74 (1975–1977)
- Scary Tales #31 (1982)

=== DC Comics ===
- Adventure Comics (New Gods) #459–460; (Aquaman) #460–461, 464–466; (Shazam!) #491–492 (1978–1982)
- All-Star Squadron Annual #3 (three pages only) (1984)
- Aquaman #60–63 (1978)
- Batman #305–306, 328, 331, 346, 352–357, 360–372, 374–379; (Catwoman) #332; (Robin) #337–338; (1978–1985)
- Batman Family (Robin, Batgirl, Man-Bat) #13 (1977)
- Blackhawk #266 (1984)
- The Brave and the Bold (Batman and Red Tornado) #153, (Batman and Doctor Fate) #156, (Batman and Man-Bat) #165 (1979–1980)
- DC Comics Presents (Superman and Green Arrow) #54 (1983)
- DC Special (Aquaman) #28 (1977)
- DC Special Series (Lightray) #10 (1978)
- DC Super Stars (Star Hunters) #16 (1977)
- Detective Comics (Batman) #480, 483–499, 501–509, 511, 513–516, 518–520, 524, 526, 533, 539; (Robin) #481; (Man-Bat) #481, 485; (Batgirl) #492 (1978–1984)
- Ghosts #92, 94 (1980)
- Green Lantern vol. 2 (Green Lantern Corps) #148–149, 181 (1982–1984)
- House of Mystery #259, 272 (1978–1979)
- Infinity, Inc. #11–13 (1985)
- Mystery in Space #117 (1981)
- New Gods #12–14, 16–19 (1977–1978)
- Secrets of Haunted House #30 (1980)
- Shazam! #35 (1978)
- Star Hunters #1 (1977)
- Time Warp #1–5 (1979–1980)
- The Unexpected #204 (1980)
- Vigilante #4 (1984)
- Weird War Tales #82, 122 (1979–1983)
- World's Finest Comics (Shazam!) #253–270, 272–281; (Green Arrow and Hawkman) #259; (Aquaman) #262 (1978–1982)

=== Marvel Comics ===
- Avengers #204 (1981); Annual #9 (1979)
- Giant-Size Defenders #3 (inks over Jim Starlin) (1975)
- Ghost Rider #23 (inks over Don Heck) (1977)
- Iron Man Annual #4 (backup story) (inks over Jeff Aclin) (1977)

Preceded by Jack Kirby (in 1972)	New Gods penciller 1977–1978	Succeeded by n/a
Preceded by Marshall Rogers	Detective Comics penciller 1978–1983	Succeeded by Gene Colan
Preceded by n/a	"Shazam!" feature in World's Finest Comics penciller 1978–1982	Succeeded by Gil Kane
Preceded by Gene Colan	Batman penciller 1982–1985	Succeeded by Rick Hoberg
Preceded by Jerry Ordway	Infinity, Inc. penciller (posthumously); 1985	Succeeded by Todd McFarlane
