= Gil Thorp =

American comic strip

- Gil Thorp coaching a Milford football player
- Author(s): Jack Berrill (creator); Jerry Jenkins (1996–2004); Neal Rubin (2004–2022); Henry Barajas (2022–present)
- Illustrator(s): Jack Berrill (creator); Warren Sattler; Frank Bolle; Ray Burns; Frank McLaughlin; Rod Whigham; Rachel Merrill
- Website: gocomics.com/gilthorp
- Current status/schedule: Running
- Launch date: September 8, 1958
- Syndicate(s): Tribune Content Agency
- Genre: Sports

Gil Thorp is a sports-oriented comic strip which has been published since September 8, 1958. The main character, Gil Thorp, is the athletic director of Milford High School and coaches the football, basketball, and baseball teams. In addition to the sports storylines, the strip also deals with issues facing teenagers such as teen pregnancy, steroids, and drug abuse.

== History ==
The strip was created by Jack Berrill, who modeled and named Thorp after baseball player Gil Hodges and Olympic athlete Jim Thorpe. The setting of Milford is named for New Milford, Connecticut when he began writing the strip. Berrill continued the strip until he died of cancer on March 14, 1996. Over the course of his 38 years, Berrill broke ground with many of his stories, often dealing with sensitive social issues of the day. As editorial standards relaxed, he was able to move from stories about jalopies and after-school jobs to topics like teen pregnancy, divorce, steroids, and sexual harassment.

When the Denver Post had a problem getting a week's worth of strips, the newspaper received over 30,000 calls.

=== Writers ===
Upon Berrill's death, Tribune Media Services chose author Jerry Jenkins (co-author of the Left Behind novels) to take over writing the strip. Jenkins had been in discussions with TMS about expanding previous Gil Thorp stories into a series of youth novels and was a logical replacement. Many of Jenkins' stories were written uncredited by his son Chad Jenkins, a baseball coach at Bethel College. The Jenkins stories discussed overtly religious topics which had not appeared in the strip before, including an Orthodox Jewish football player and a 15-year-old pregnant girl whom Thorp talks out of getting an abortion.

In 2004, Jenkins was followed as writer by Detroit News columnist Neal Rubin.

In 2022, the Tribune Content Agency announced that graphic novel writer Henry Barajas would take over authorship of the strip beginning in July of that year.

=== Artists ===
The strip was drawn by Berrill from 1958–1993 until glaucoma forced him to turn the reins over to his Connecticut Cartoonist Associate colleague Warren Sattler. Later, Frank Bolle took over, followed by Ray Burns. Frank McLaughlin took over following Burns' death in 2000. On February 18, 2008, Apartment 3G artist Frank Bolle again took over art chores for Gil Thorp on an interim basis. Rod Whigham became the permanent artist two months later. Starting September 30, 2024 Rachel Merrill became the artist for Gil Thorp.

== The Bucket ==
The Bucket was an online forum hosted by the Chicago Tribune, named after the teen burger hangout in the strip, The Bucket. It was a lively site for 15 years and featured discussions about the strip and other topics. Members of the community were known as "Bucketeers".
