= Neal Rubin =

American cartoonist and writer (born 1955)

Neal Anthony Rubin
- Born: 1955 (age 70–71); Southern California
- Occupation: columnist
- Known for: wrote Gil Thorp comic strip

Neal Rubin (born 1955) is an American cartoonist and writer. He is currently a columnist for the Detroit Free Press. He previously wrote the nationally syndicated comic strip Gil Thorp. He previously spent 15 years as a feature writer and columnist for the Detroit Free Press but left to write for The Detroit News. He previously wrote features for the Las Vegas Review-Journal and was a sports writer for the Las Vegas Sun and the Greeley Tribune. After 22 years at The Detroit News, he returned to the Detroit Free Press on April 17, 2022.

He was born in Southern California and grew up in California and Colorado. He attended the University of Northern Colorado and later earned a graduate degree from Michigan State University. He has lived in Michigan since 1984.

He wrote the Gil Thorp comic strip from 2004 to 2022, and was the third author in the strip's 65+-year history.

Rubin appears as himself in the 2007 Elmore Leonard novel Up in Honey's Room. He had a small speaking role (credited as Neal Anthony Rubin) as a reporter in the 2011 movie The Ides of March, starring George Clooney and Ryan Gosling.

He lives with his wife and two sons in Farmington Hills, Michigan.
