= Dungeons of Horror =

- Directed by: Pat Boyette
- Written by: Pat Boyette; Henry Garcia
- Produced by: Russ Harvey; Don Russell
- Starring: Russ Harvey
- Cinematography: James C. Houston
- Edited by: Don Russell
- Distributed by: Herts-Lion International Corp.
- Release date: February 1964
- Running time: 86 minutes
- Country: United States
- Language: English

Dungeons of Horror, also known as Dungeon of Horror and Dungeon of Harrow, is a 1964 American independent Gothic horror film reminiscent of Roger Corman's Edgar Allan Poe cycle of films for American International Pictures. Shot in and near San Antonio, Texas, it was directed by, co-edited and co-written by San Antonio television anchorman and future comic book artist Pat Boyette who also scored the film with public domain music and drew the film poster. Co-writer Henry Garcia also appeared in the film. The film starred Russ Harvey who co-produced the film with Don Russell who was the film's art director and co-editor along with Pat Boyette. San Antonio horror host Joe Alston appeared in the film as an evil spirit.

== Plot ==
In the 1870s, Aaron Fallon, the last of his family, undertakes a sea voyage that meets with disaster. The only apparent survivors are Fallon and the ship's captain, but they hear the screams of one of the women passengers whose body they find, savaged by an unknown animal.

They discover a crumbling castle inhabited by the Count de Sade who talks with a spirit and his collection of horrid animals. In addition to the Count, the castle has his manservant Mantis, Cassandra, a former nurse, and the mute servant whipping girl Ann, and the supposedly leprous wife of the Count who is kept in a dungeon. The mentally challenged Count believes the Captain to be a pirate and has him tortured, then he and his manservant hunts Fallon and Cassandra in the manner of The Most Dangerous Game.

== Cast ==
- Russ Harvey ... Aaron Fallon
- Helen Hogan ... Cassandra
- Lee Morgan ... The Captain
- William McNulty ... Count Lorente de Sade
- Michele Buquor ... Ann
- Maurice Harris ... Mantis
- Eunice Grey ... Countess de Sade
- Joe Alston ... The Spirit
- Henry Garcia
- Don Russell

== Production ==
Russ Harvey also made the similar low budget No Man's Land.

== Release ==
The film was one of ten films picked up for distribution by Herts-Lion in 1964. Boyette said in an interview that Dungeons of Harrow suffered from the casting of Harvey in the lead, and the fact that his distributor wanted 90 minutes of film that forced the director to leave in at least 20 minutes of unnecessary footage. Herts-Lion soon ceased to exist. In 1963 the company had planned to "package" the release of the film with that of The Secret of the Telegian, a Japanese sci-fi film that had come out in Japan in 1960.
