= Son of Vulcan =

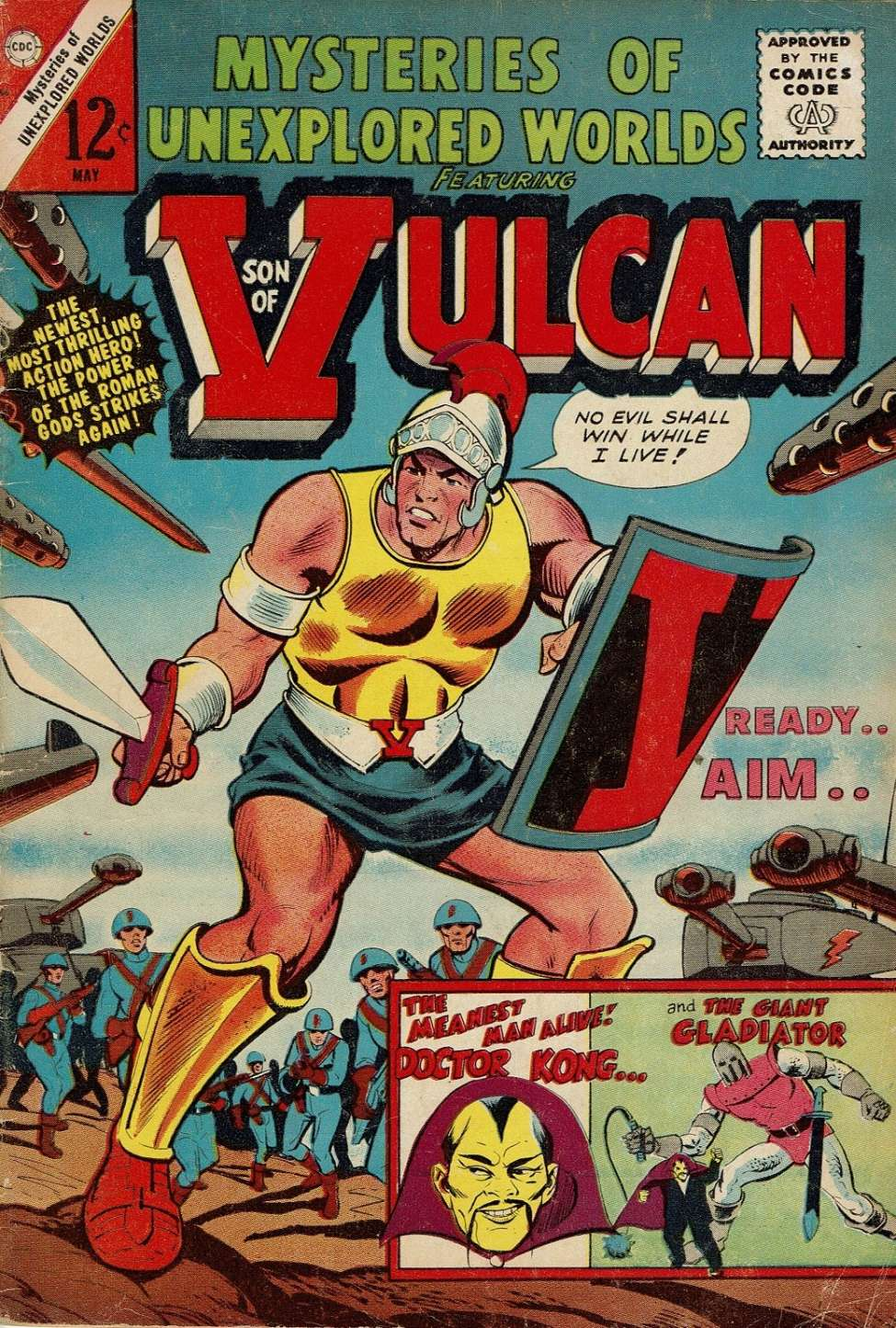
- Son of Vulcan's debut, cover art by Dick Giordano.

Publication information
- Publisher: Charlton Comics, later by DC Comics
- First appearance: Mysteries of Unexplored Worlds #46 (May 1965)
- Created by: Pat Masulli and Bill Fraccio

In-story information
- Alter ego: Johnny Mann
- Species: Demigod
- Team affiliations: Roman gods
- Notable aliases: Halciber Filius
- Abilities: Can transform into demigod possessing superhuman strength, speed and senses, flight, invulnerability to fire, and indestructible armor who can summon both fireballs and powerful ancient weapons from the forge of his adopted father Vulcan; later bestowed with all the powers of the entire Olympian pantheon (War of the Gods).

Son of Vulcan is the name of two comic book characters, one created by Charlton Comics in 1965, the other by DC Comics in August 2005. Son of Vulcan was one of the characters DC Comics purchased from defunct Charlton Comics in 1983.

== Publication history ==
The Johnny Mann version of Son of Vulcan first appeared in the Charlton Comics series Mysteries of Unexplored Worlds #46 (May 1965), retitled Son of Vulcan with issue #49, and was created by writer Pat Masulli and artist Bill Fraccio. Charlton staff writer Joe Gill would write most of his stories. Predating the Charlton "Action Heroes" line, Son of Vulcan is not properly part of that group. His final Charlton story, "The Second Trojan War" in Son of Vulcan #50 (Jan. 1966, the last issue, after which the title became Peter Cannon, Thunderbolt for another ten issues), was the first professional work of writer and future Marvel Comics editor-in-chief Roy Thomas, with the previous issue having seen the character being given a new and more ornate costume designed by a young, cover-credited Dave Cockrum. DC has made very little use of Son of Vulcan. He appeared briefly in DC Challenge #9 where he was introduced into the DC universe by the aforementioned Roy Thomas and returned to take a more pivotal part in the War of the Gods miniseries that followed the Crisis on Infinite Earths crossover only to be killed off in the last issue. In 2005, DC published a new Son of Vulcan miniseries whose title character and series premise was unrelated to the original.

== Fictional character biography ==
=== Johnny Mann ===
==== Charlton Comics version ====
The original Charlton character was Johnny Mann, a scrawny but courageous reporter for an international news syndicate who had lost a leg while serving during the Korean War. Covering a bloody civil war on the Mediterranean island of Cyprete, he complained aloud while standing in the ruins of an ancient temple that the gods play with men's lives while leaving them defenseless against the forces of war and crime.

Taking offense, the Roman gods transported him to Mount Olympus where he was put on trial before Jupiter, all-powerful king of the gods, for his impudence. The war god Mars argued for his immediate destruction, but Vulcan, lame-legged god of fire and forge, spoke up in his defense, and Venus, goddess of love, agreed with Vulcan. In the end, bonding with the orphaned newsman over their similar disabilities, Vulcan agreed to adopt Johnny and share with him god-like powers that would help him fight injustice in the mortal world.

By calling on Vulcan's aid, Johnny would transform into a superhuman demigod, whole again and mightily muscled and clad in indestructible Roman-style armor and shield with the power to summon both fire and powerful ancient weapons from his adopted father's forge. However, it was the judgment of Jupiter that his powers could be removed from him at any time if the gods ever decided he was unworthy of them. Mars often plots against him to make him lose favor with Jupiter or destroy him and was exiled from Olympus for this.

As the Son of Vulcan, Johnny had several adventures where he battled both a jealous Mars and the Asian arch-criminal Dr. Kong (the so-called "meanest man alive" who resembled a cross between Fu Manchu and Dracula) but remained a little-known hero.

==== DC Comics version ====
During the Crisis on Infinite Earths storyline, Son of Vulcan is seen on New Earth fighting the Anti-Monitor's Shadow Demons. He vanishes from existence after the Anti-Monitor is defeated.

During the War of the Gods storyline, the Roman gods intend for Son of Vulcan (now known on Olympus as Halciber Filius, a Latinized version of his name, and endowed with all their divine powers rather than just those of Vulcan) to be their champion against the Greek gods' champion, Wonder Woman. However, he refuses, with Captain Marvel being chosen in his stead. Son of Vulcan investigates the cause of the war and meets Harmonia, daughter of the Greek god Ares. The two learn that the war was part of a plan by the sorceress Circe to gain absolute power. Son of Vulcan and Harmonia fall in love, but are killed in battle. Vulcan personally escorts their souls to Elysium.

=== Miguel Devante ===
Orphan Miguel "Mikey" Devante, age 14, is taken hostage by Floronic Man at Big Belly Burger in Miguel's hometown of Charlton's Point. A relatively unknown hero named Vulcan tells Mikey to free the other hostages while he battles Floronic Man. Miguel stays back after freeing the other hostages to ensure Vulcan is safe. Miguel saves Vulcan from danger by chopping off Floronic Man's arm with Vulcan's sword. Vulcan chooses Miguel to be his successor.

Miguel and the android Pandora go to San Francisco, where Miguel is seen talking to Beast Boy of the Teen Titans and has assumed the codename Vulcan. Vulcan goes on to join the group Titans East.

== Other versions ==
- Darkseid once masqueraded as a Son of Vulcan knockoff named Janus, Son of Jupiter (the name is probably also a reference to Jemm, Son of Saturn). As Janus he possessed great strength and the ability to fly. He also carried a supposedly indestructible shield and a high-tech mace. As Janus, Darkseid appeared as a handsome blond human. He first appears in Super Powers series 3 #3 (Nov 1986).
- In Grant Morrison's Animal Man storyline "Deus Ex Machina", Psycho-Pirate recreated characters removed from continuity while in Arkham Asylum. Son of Vulcan (or a Pre-Crisis version of him) was one of them. He appears as he originally did in Charlton Comics. Presumably, this character vanished from existence when the Psycho-Pirate's episode of madness ended, along with his colleagues.
