= The Many Ghosts of Doctor Graves =

American supernatural-anthology comic book

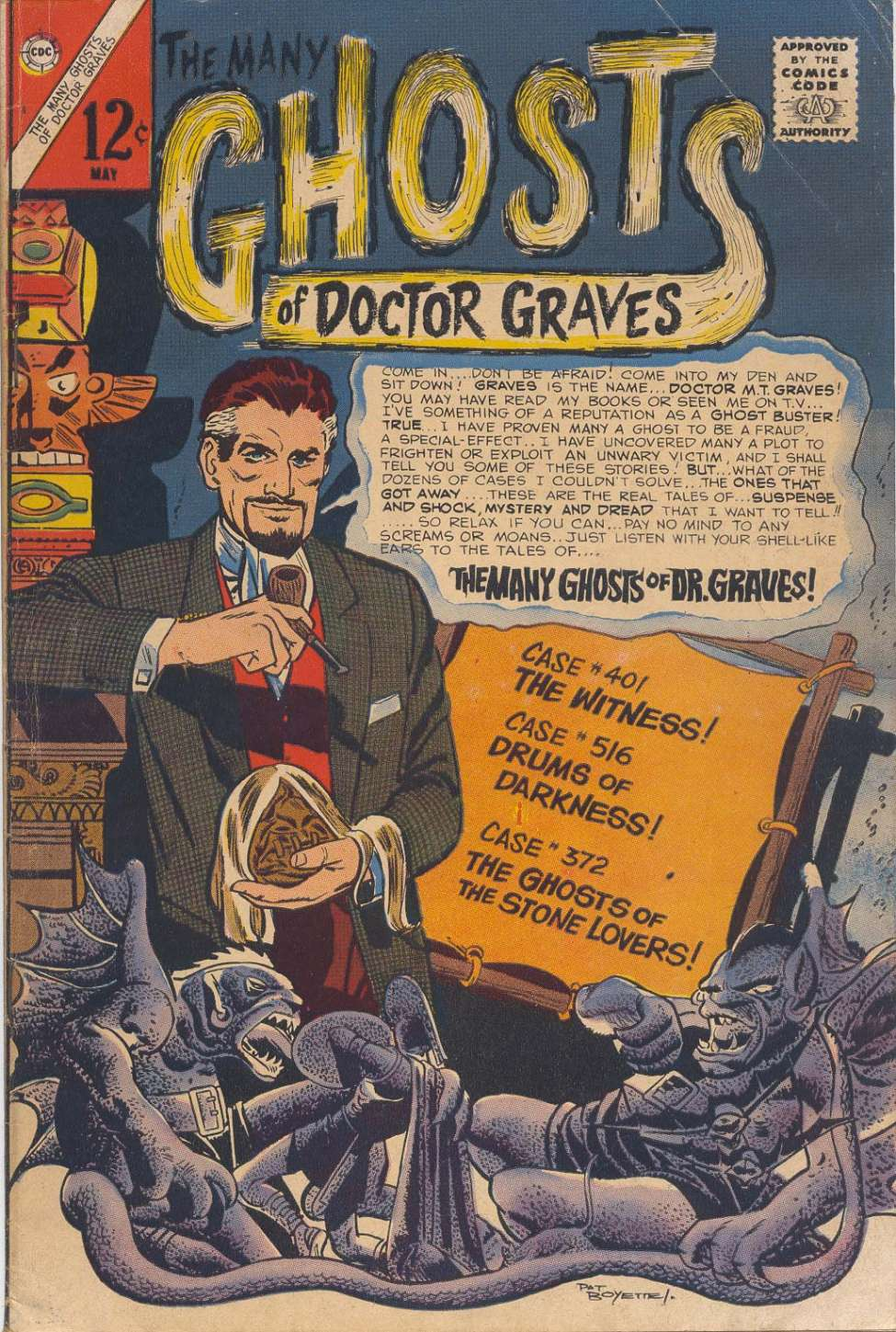
- Cover of The Many Ghosts of Doctor Graves #1 (May 1967), art by Pat Boyette.

Publication information
- Publisher: Charlton Comics
- Schedule: Bimonthly
- Format: Anthology
- Publication date: May 1967 - Jan. 1986
- No. of issues: 75
- Main character: Doctor M.T. Graves

Creative team
- Created by: (title character) Ernie Bache
- Written by: Steve Ditko, Steve Skeates, Mike Pellowski, Joe Gill
- Artist(s): Steve Ditko, Jim Aparo, Vince Alascia, Pat Boyette, Pete Morisi, Rocke Mastroserio, Charles Nicholas, Rich Larson, Don Newton, Tom Sutton

The Many Ghosts of Doctor Graves is an American supernatural-anthology comic book that was published by Charlton Comics, often featuring stories by writer-artist Steve Ditko. The eponymous Dr. M. T. Graves was a fictional character who hosted the stories in each issue of this title, and very occasionally took part in a tale.

Sister titles, with many of the same creators, particularly Ditko, were the Charlton anthologies Ghost Manor (with host Mr. Bones) and its successor, Ghostly Haunts (with host Winnie the Witch); Ghostly Tales (with host Mr. L. Dedd, later I. M. Dedd); and Haunted (with hosts Impy and then Baron Weirwulf).

The series won the 1967 Alley Award for Best Fantasy/SF/Supernatural Title.

== Publication history ==
Following his introduction as Dr. M. T. Graves in Charlton Comics' Ghostly Tales #55 (cover-dated May 1966) in the three-page story "The Ghost Fighter" by writer-artist Ernie Bache, the character went on to host his own anthology title, The Many Ghosts of Doctor Graves. The series ran 72 issues (May 1967 - May 1982), generally published bimonthly.

In issue #5, the fourth-wall-breaking story "Best of All Possible Worlds" by Steve Skeates and Jim Aparo involved a reader who's pulled into the pages of the comic book, and has to decide whether to venture back to the real world.

Following issue #60 (Jan. 1977), the title went on hiatus for seven months until issue #61 (Aug. 1977) before being canceled with #65 (May 1978). Charlton revived the title three years later with #66 (May 1981) before canceling it once more six issues later.

The Many Ghosts of Doctor Graves #54 (Dec. 1973). The cover art is among the earliest professional works of John Byrne.

Three additional issues consisting solely of reprints, and titled simply Dr. Graves, were published as issues #73-75 (Sept. 1985 - Jan. 1986).

Among the artists whose work appeared were Steve Ditko, following his falling-out with Marvel Comics; newcomer Jim Aparo, later to be one of Batman's signature artists; regular Charlton talents including Vince Alascia, Pat Boyette, Pete Morisi, Rocke Mastroserio, and Charles Nicholas; and such others as Rich Larson, Don Newton and Tom Sutton. The cover of issue #54 (Dec. 1975) marks one of the earliest professional works of John Byrne.

Writers on the title included Ditko, Steve Skeates, Mike Pellowski, and the prolific, generally uncredited staff writer Joe Gill.

== Awards ==
The Many Ghosts of Doctor Graves won the 1967 Alley Award for Best Fantasy/SF/Supernatural Title.
