= Ghostly Tales =

American comic book series

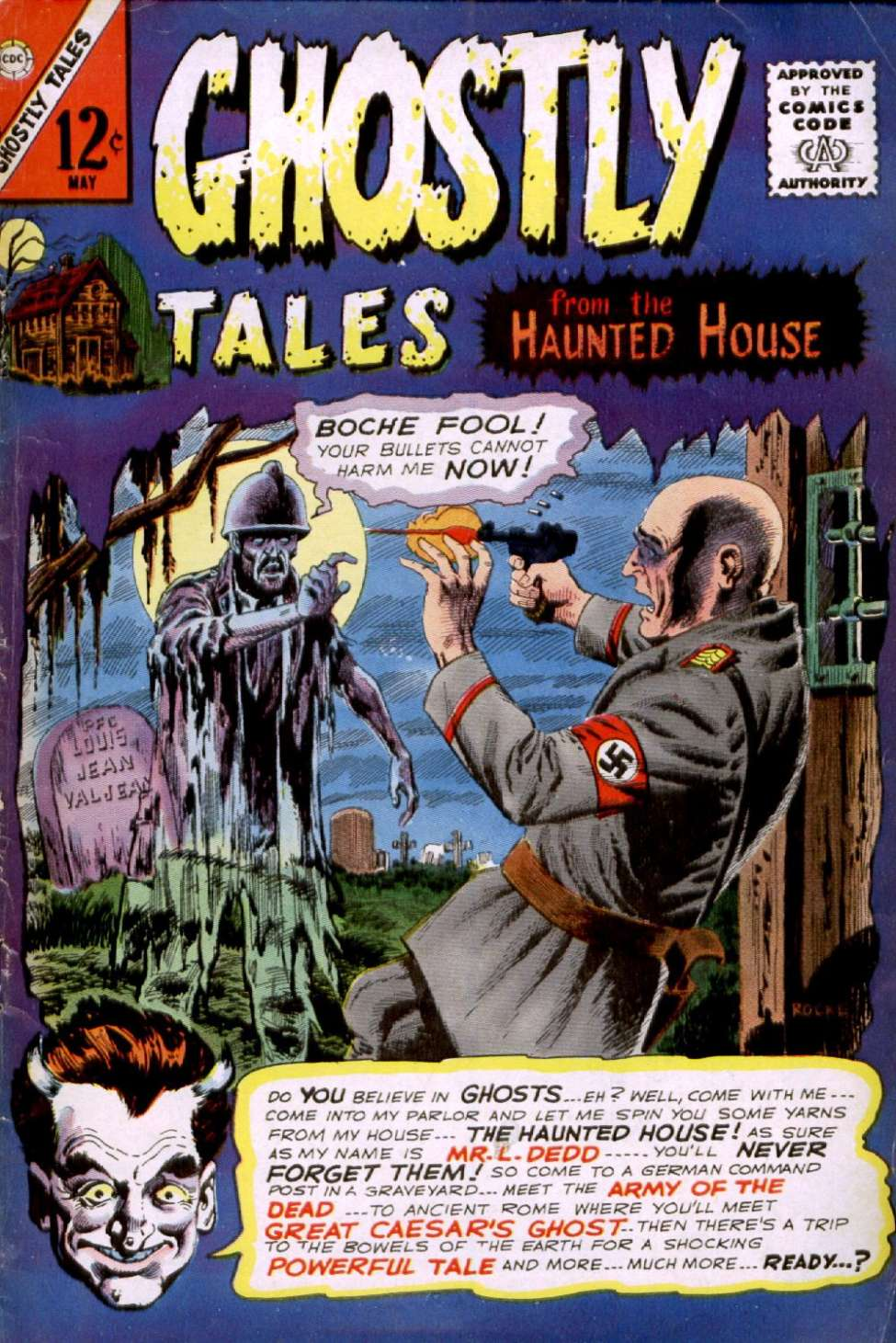
- Cover of Ghostly Tales#55 (May 1966), the first issue of the new title, art by Rocke Mastroserio.

Publication information
- Publisher: Charlton Comics
- Schedule: Bimonthly
- Format: anthology
- Genre: Horror
- Publication date: May 1966-October 1984
- No. of issues: 115
- Main character: Mr. L. Dedd/I.M. Dedd
- Editor(s): Pat Masulli, Sal Gentile, George Wildman

Ghostly Tales is a horror-suspense anthology comic book series that was published by Charlton Comics from 1966 to 1984 (though it was primarily a reprint title from 1978 onward). The book was "hosted" by Mr. L. Dedd (later changed to I. M. Dedd), a middle-aged gentleman with purplish skin and horns who dressed like a vampire. Mr. Dedd spun his "ghostly tales" from the parlor of his "haunted house".

Ghostly Tales was part of a wave of new horror and suspense comics published by Charlton during this period. Its sister titles, with many of the same creators, were the Charlton anthologies The Many Ghosts of Doctor Graves (with host Dr. M. T. Graves), Haunted (with hosts Impy and then Baron Weirwulf), Ghost Manor (with host Mr. Bones), and Ghostly Haunts (with host Winnie the Witch).

== Publication history ==
Ghostly Tales debuted with issue #55, taking over the numbering of Blue Beetle vol. 3 (which itself had continued the numbering of Unusual Tales). Ghostly Tales was predominantly bimonthly during its run; it went on a publishing hiatus between issues #124 and #125 from January to August 1977. It became primarily a reprint title with issue #127 (Jan. 1978), republishing material from its own archives as well as those of its sister titles (and some Golden Age material from titles like Unusual Tales and Fawcett's This Magazine is Haunted — whose rights Charlton owned). Altogether, Ghostly Tales published 115 issues.

Regular contributors to the book included Pat Boyette, Steve Ditko, Wayne Howard, Russ Jones & Bhob Stewart, and Rocke Mastroserio. Over the course of its 18-year run, Ghostly Tales was edited by Pat Masulli, Sal Gentile, and George Wildman. Wildman edited the title for more than twelve years, from issue #97 (August 1972) until its cancellation with issue #169 (Oct. 1984).

Horror comics in general were in decline in the early 1980s, and Charlton in particular was suffering financially. In October 1984, Charlton suspended publication, and Ghostly Tales ended its run, although the company did release several additional horror reprint issues under different titles through 1986.
