= No Man's Land (1964 film) =

- Directed by: Pat Boyette; Russ Harvey
- Produced by: Russ Harvey
- Starring: Russ Harvey
- Release date: 24 January 1964
- Country: United States
- Language: English
- Budget: $30,000

No Man's Land is a 1964 American black-and-white war drama film written and produced by Russ Harvey, who also plays the main role. The film is set during the Korean War. No Man’s Land was released under Harvey's name as director but the film appears to have actually been directed by Pat Boyette.

== Plot ==
During the Korean War, a U.S. Army Corporal falls in love with a Korean girl.

== Cast ==
- Russ Harvey as Corporal Jerry Little
- Kim Lee as Anna Wong
- Lee Morgan

== Production ==
No Man's Land was filmed in and around San Antonio, Texas in 1962, partly on the ranch of Major General Harry H. Johnson on the S. Flores Road.

The film was directed and produced by Russ Harvey. Harvey played the main role in the film; he later starred (also in the lead role) in Dungeon of Horror, released in 1964. These were his only contributions to the film industry. Both films were low budget productions shot in San Antonio.

Various sources mention Pat Boyette as director or co-director/producer of No Man's Land, even stating that he had "complete creative control" over the film, which Frank T. Thompson confirms in Texas Hollywood: Filmmaking in San Antonio Since 1910.

== Release ==
No Man's Land premiered in San Antonio in January 1964.

According to one review "the story is pointless and the acting is non existent. The best things about the movie are stock newsreel shots of actual combat."
