= José Delbo =

Argentine comics artist (1933–2024)

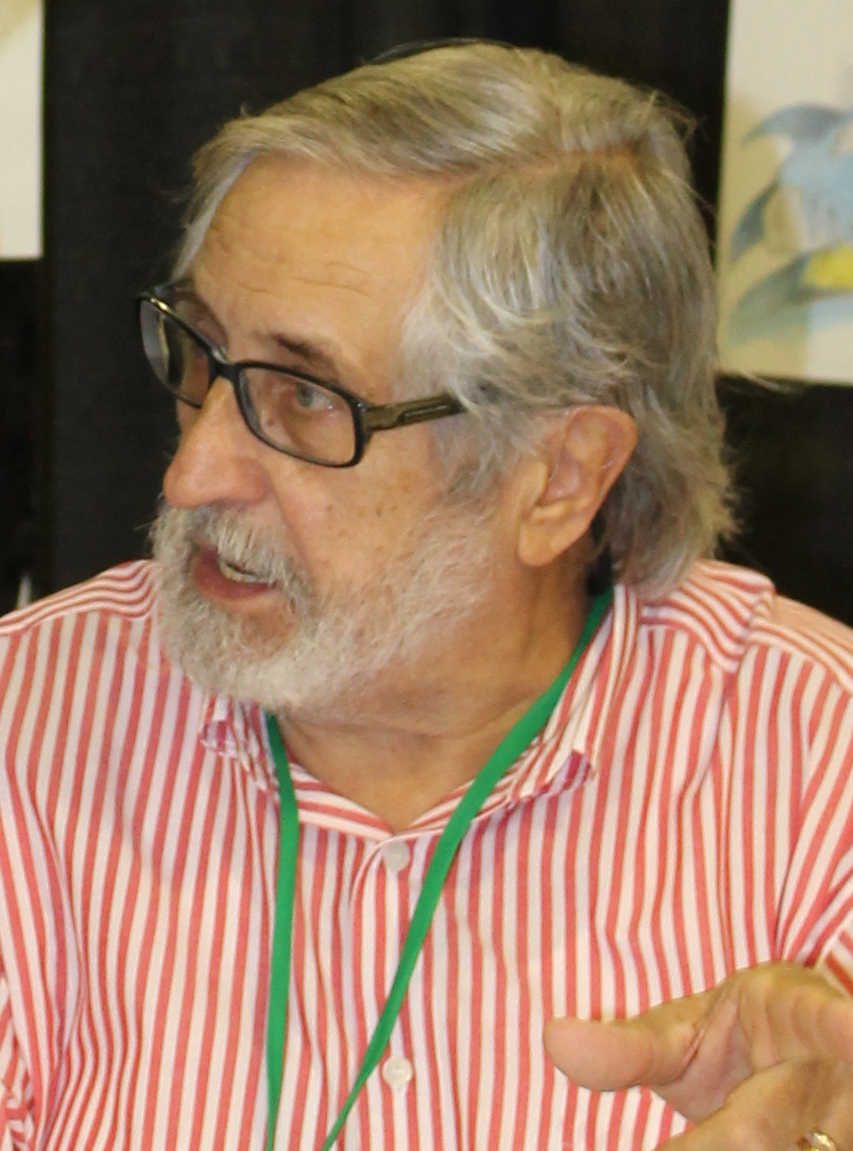
- Delbo at the Florida Supercon in 2013
- Born: José María Del Bó; December 9, 1933 Buenos Aires, Argentina
- Died: February 5, 2024 (aged 90) Boca Raton, Florida, U.S.
- Areas: Penciller, Inker
- Notable works: Wonder Woman; The Transformers
- Awards: Inkpot Award 2013

José Delbo (born José María Del Bó; December 9, 1933 – February 5, 2024) was an Argentine comics artist. He was best known for his work on Wonder Woman for DC Comics and The Transformers for Marvel Comics.

== Life and career ==
José María Del Bó was born on December 9, 1933. He became a professional comics artist at the age of 16 working for the Argentine Poncho Negro series. Due to political instability in Argentina, he moved to Brazil in 1963 and then to the United States two years later. His early work for the U.S. market included Billy the Kid for Charlton Comics. He drew many TV tie-in comic books for Dell Comics and Western Publishing's Gold Key Comics including The Brady Bunch, Hogan's Heroes, The Mod Squad, The Monkees, and The Twilight Zone. A comics biography of Dwight D. Eisenhower drawn by Delbo was published by Dell in 1969 soon after the former President's death. Delbo named The Monkees, The Lone Ranger, and an adaptation of the Yellow Submarine film as being among his favorite projects.

His first work for DC Comics appeared in The Spectre #10 (May–June 1969). Delbo became the artist on the Wonder Woman title with issue #222 (Feb.–March 1976) and drew the series until #286 (Dec. 1981). Following the popularity of the Wonder Woman television series (initially set during World War II), Delbo and writer Martin Pasko transposed the comic book series to this era. A few months after the TV series changed its setting to the 1970s, Delbo and Jack C. Harris returned the comic book to the contemporary timeline. Soon after, Wonder Woman's longtime love interest Steve Trevor was killed but writer Gerry Conway and Delbo brought the character back to life again in issue #271 (Sept. 1980). The Lumberjack, a character created by Delbo and Conway in Wonder Woman #268 (June 1980) appeared on the Supergirl television series in 2015. Conway and Delbo introduced a new version of the Cheetah in issue #274 (Dec. 1980).

Delbo's other work for DC includes the Batman Family, three stories for the "Whatever Happened to...?" backup feature in DC Comics Presents, the Jimmy Olsen feature in The Superman Family, and the Batgirl feature in Detective Comics. His final major work for DC was a brief run on the Superman/Batman feature in World's Finest Comics in 1985.

In 1986, Delbo began working for Marvel Comics where he drew ThunderCats, The Transformers, and NFL SuperPro. He co-created Brute Force with Simon Furman in 1990.

Delbo taught at The Kubert School from the 1990s until 2005. After moving to Florida, he taught at the "Delbo Cartoon Camp" program for school-aged children in Boca Raton.

Delbo died in February 2024, at the age of 90.

== Awards ==
Delbo received an Inkpot Award at San Diego Comic-Con in 2013.

Preceded by Curt Swan	Wonder Woman artist 1976–1981	Succeeded by Don Heck
Preceded by Dick Giordano	"Batgirl" feature in Detective Comics artist 1980–1982	Succeeded by Trevor Von Eeden
Preceded by Don Perlin	The Transformers artist 1988–1990	Succeeded by Geoff Senior
Preceded by Geoff Senior	The Transformers artist 1990	Succeeded by Geoff Senior
Preceded by Geoff Senior	The Transformers artist 1990	Succeeded by Dwayne Turner
