= Peter Cannon, Thunderbolt =

Charlton Comics character

Thunderbolt
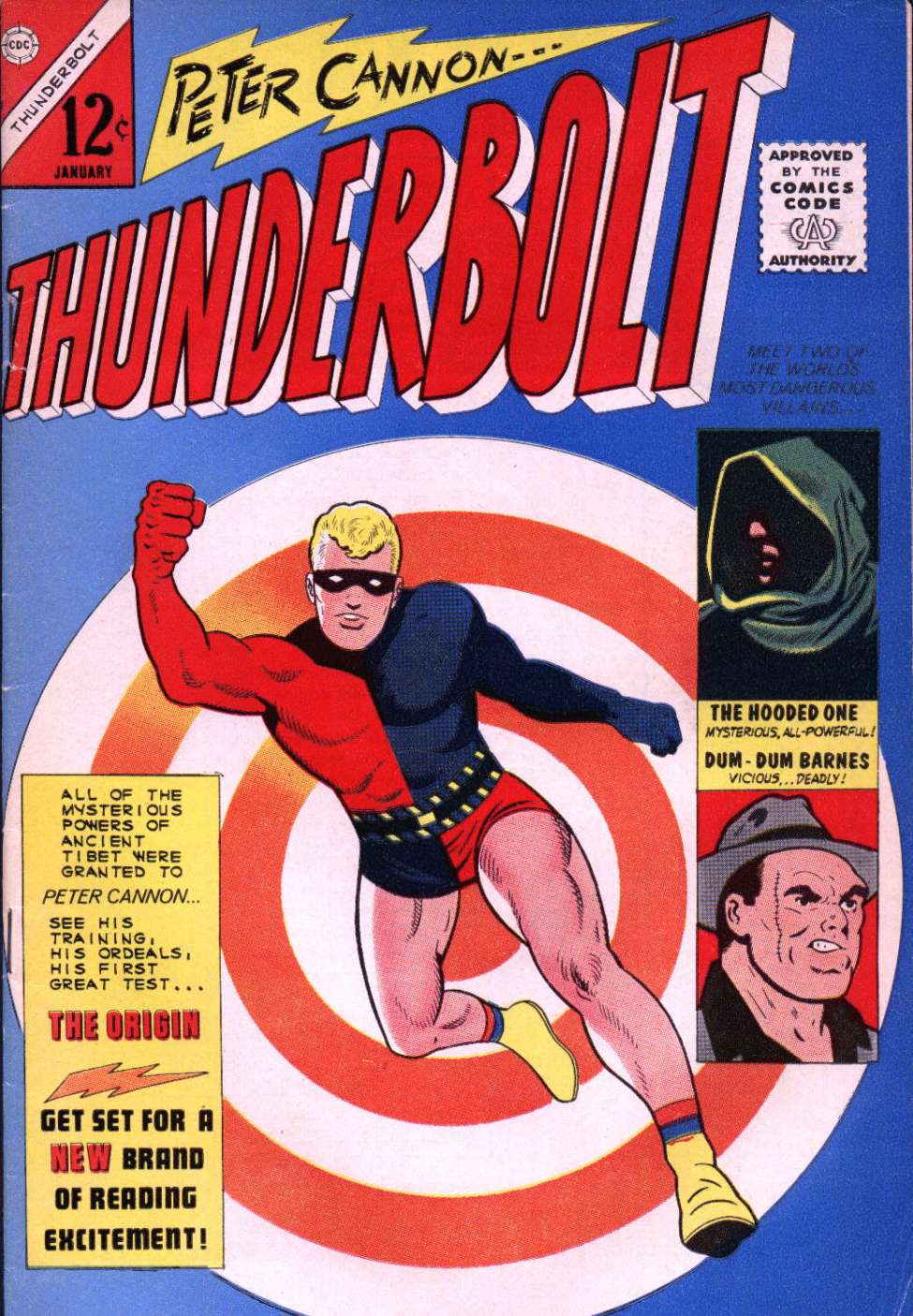
- Cover of Peter Cannon ... Thunderbolt #1 (Aug. 1966), art by Pete Morisi.

Publication information
- Publisher: Originally Charlton Comics, later DC Comics and Dynamite Entertainment
- First appearance: Thunderbolt #1 (January 1966)
- Created by: Pete Morisi

In-story information
- Alter ego: Peter Cannon
- Team affiliations: Justice League; Justice League Task Force
- Abilities: Mind over matter (the art of activating and harnessing that unused portion of the brain); DC Comics: Enhanced physical abilities and intelligence; Low level telekinesis; Psychic control over animals; Ability to ignore pain; Clairvoyance

Peter Cannon, Thunderbolt is a superhero character originally published by Charlton Comics.

== Publication history ==
=== Charlton Comics ===
Created by Pete Morisi, the character debuted in Peter Cannon ... Thunderbolt #1 (Jan. 1966), part of Charlton editor Dick Giordano's "Action Heroes" superhero line. The series then took over the numbering of the defunct title Son of Vulcan, and ran from issue #51 through #60 (March/April 1966 – November 1967), after which Pete Morisi, who in addition to comic book work was also a New York City Police Department officer, time-pressed with police duties, left the title, which was canceled along with the rest of Charlton's "Action Heroes" comics line.

There were several backup series in Thunderbolt. "The Sentinels", by Gary Friedrich (writing his first superhero stories) and penciler-inker Sam Grainger, appeared in #54–59, and #60 had the Prankster, written by Dennis O'Neil with art by Jim Aparo.

Morisi, who'd done work for Lev Gleason Publications in 1940s, reported in Comic Book Artist #9 (August 2000) that he had attempted to buy the rights to 1940s superhero Daredevil in the early 1960s. Gleason gave him his okay, but the character's primary writer-artist, Charles Biro, balked, requesting a percentage of future profits. Morisi declined and went on to create Thunderbolt in a scaled-down version of that Daredevil's symmetrically divided, red-and-blue costume.

Peter Cannon – Thunderbolt #1 (September 1992), art by Mike Collins and Jose Marzan Jr.

=== DC Comics ===
After Charlton sold its superhero properties to DC in 1983, Thunderbolt reappeared after almost two decades in the Crisis on Infinite Earths crossover series (April 1985 – March 1986, Thunderbolt appearing in #6, 7, and 10) when he joined the heroes of the Multiverse in their crusade against the Anti-Monitor.

Introducing him into the new DC Universe, DC published Peter Cannon – Thunderbolt, by writer-penciler Mike Collins and inker Jose Marzan Jr. The series ran for 12 issues before cancellation (September 1992 – August 1993). During the series' short run, his recurring foils were the criminal terrorists-for-hire known as Scorpio. He later discovers that his girlfriend Cairo DeFrey was actually in charge of the organization.

The character also appeared briefly with the Justice League.

=== Dynamite Entertainment ===
Dynamite Entertainment published a ten issue series between September 2012 and July 2013. The series was co-written by Steve Darnall and Alex Ross, with art by Jonathan Lau.

The character later appeared in a new series published since February 2019, written by Kieron Gillen with art by Caspar Wijngaard, Mary Jo Safro and Hassan Otsmane-Elhaou. In this series, it is revealed that Peter Cannon and Tabu were lovers.

A new series has been announced in July 2022 and later on in July 2025 was announced a new series coming November 2025

== Fictional character biography ==
His origin, as detailed in the original comic:

Peter Cannon, orphaned son of an American medical team, was raised in a Himalayan lamasery, where his parents had sacrificed their lives combating the dreaded Black Plague! After attaining the highest degree of mental and physical perfection, he was entrusted with the knowledge of the ancient scrolls that bore the secret writings of past generations of wise men! From them he learned concentration, mind over matter, the art of activating and then harnessing the unused portions of the brain, that made seemingly fantastic feats possible! Then he returned to America with his faithful friend, Tabu, and sought out a new life, in a new land, that required the emergence of Peter Cannon... Thunderbolt.

His costume is his training outfit from the lamasery, with an added mask. A recurring villain is the "Hooded One", another monk from the lamasery who resented the fact an outsider like Peter was given access to the sacred scrolls.
