= Pat Boyette =

American journalist (1923–2000)

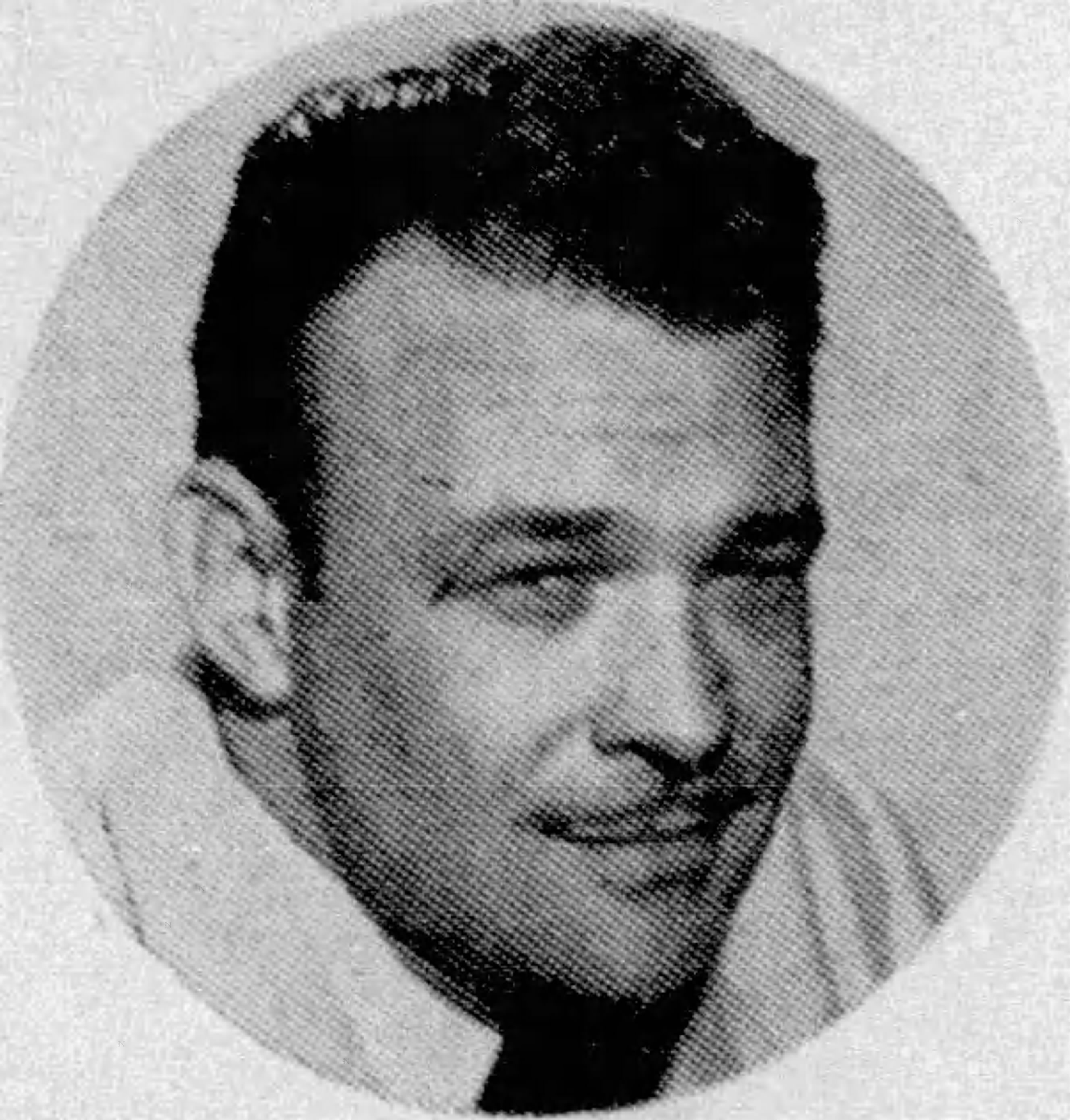
- Boyette in 1956
- Born: Aaron P. Boyette; July 23, 1923 San Antonio, Texas
- Died: January 14, 2000 (aged 76) Fort Worth, Texas
- Areas: Artist, Writer, Broadcasting personality
- Notable works: The Peacemaker
- Awards: Inkpot Award (1980)

Aaron P. "Pat" Boyette (July 27, 1923 – January 14, 2000) was an American broadcasting personality and news producer, and later a comic book artist best known for two decades of work for Charlton Comics, where he co-created the character the Peacemaker. He sometimes used the pen names Sam Swell, Bruce Lovelace, and Alexander Barnes.

== Biography ==
=== Broadcast career ===
Born and raised in San Antonio, Texas, Pat Boyette entered radio drama as a youngster, performing on a local soap opera. He became a broadcast journalist at radio station WOAI, and returned to this career following his World War II military service as a cryptographer. He later segued into television, becoming a TV news anchor in San Antonio, Texas. Additionally, Boyette became the producer of a daytime talk show, a puppet show, and TV commercials.

=== Films ===
Boyette directed, co-wrote, scored and narrated the low-budget 1962 horror movie The Dungeon of Harrow (Dungeons of Horror), which was reminiscent of Roger Corman's Edgar Allan Poe cycle of films. He also wrote, produced and directed the science-fiction comedy The Weird Ones a.k.a. The Weird One (1962), and co-directed the Korean War picture No Man's Land (1964). All the films were shot in Texas. In 1970 he wrote the screenplay for David L. Hewitt's girl moonshiners vs. bikers film The Girls from Thunder Strip.

=== Comics ===
While continuing to work in television, he wrote and drew the short-lived Western comic strip Captain Flame for a syndicate owned by Charlie Plumm. He returned to comics after first leaving broadcasting and spending most of the 1960s shooting movies in San Antonio.

==== Charlton ====
Turning to comic books, Boyette began a two-decade stint as a freelance artist for the Derby, Connecticut-based, low-budget Charlton Comics. His first known work for the company is the nine-page story "'Spacious' Rooms for Rent" in the supernatural-suspense anthology Shadows from Beyond #50 (Oct. 1966). The Grand Comics Database also tentatively identifies an additional nine-page story that issue, "Reprieve!", as being penciled by Boyette.

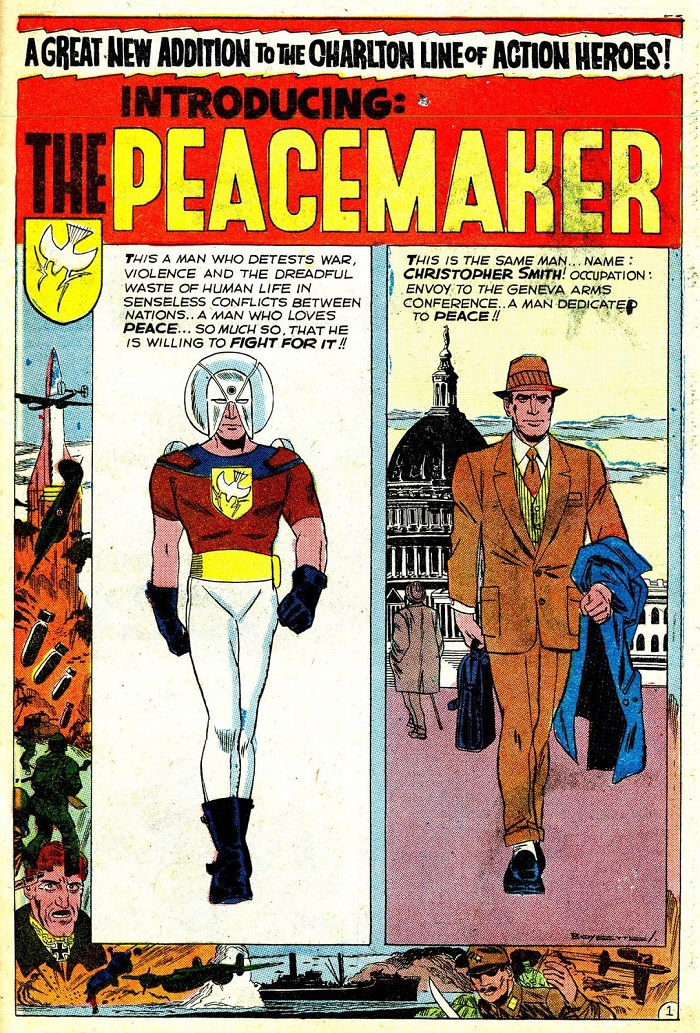
Boyette's art of the Peacemaker, debut in Fightin' 5 #40 (November 1966)

On his next assignment, Boyette co-created with staff writer Joe Gill the non-superpowered superhero The Peacemaker in the backup story in Fightin' 5 #40 (Nov. 1966). The Peacemaker was Christopher Smith, a pacifist diplomat so committed to peace that he was willing to use force to advance the cause, employing an array of special non-lethal weapons, and also founding the Pax Institute. Most of his antagonists were dictators and warlords. The Peacemaker received his own title which lasted five issues, cover-dated March to November 1967, with the Fightin' 5 as a backup series. DC Comics acquired the character following Charlton's demise in the mid-1980s, and the Peacemaker became the basis for the character the Comedian in writer Alan Moore's DC Comics miniseries Watchmen.

Boyette drew, and often wrote, hundreds of stories for Charlton through to at least 1976, for such supernatural series as Ghost Manor, Ghostly Tales, and The Many Ghosts of Doctor Graves; science fiction series like Outer Space, Strange Suspense Stories, Space: 1999 and Space Adventures; Western series such as Billy the Kid, Cheyenne Kid, and Outlaws of the West; romance comics such as Love Diary and Secret Romance; war comics like Attack and Fightin' Marines; and the licensed-character series Flash Gordon, Jungle Jim and The Phantom from King Features, the prehistoric adventure series Korg: 70,000 B.C. and The Six Million Dollar Man. Boyette also took on the writing and art for the superhero series Peter Cannon, Thunderbolt, succeeding creator Pete Morisi. His work continued to be published at Charlton as reprints through to at least 1986. Some of his Charlton work was reprinted as late as 2002 in Avalon Communications' Enemies and Aces #1.

==== Other comics work ====
For a brief period in 1968, Boyette drew issues of the DC Comics aviator series Blackhawk. That same year, his friend and Charlton colleague Rocke Mastroserio helped Boyette join the stable of artists freelancing for Warren Publishing's black-and-white horror-comics magazines, initially having him ghost-pencil, uncredited, "The Rescue of the Morning Maid" in Creepy #18 (Jan. 1968), which credited artist Mastroserio inked. Boyette would go on to do credited work for such other Warren titles as Eerie occasionally through 1970 before making Charlton his base. In the mid-1970s, he drew the feature "The Tarantula" in Atlas Comics' Weird Suspense.

Boyette's other comic work includes a Black Hood story for Archie Comics' eponymous costumed crime-fighter comic, in 1983; an issue of the science-fiction series Revolver for Renegade Press in 1986; his self-published SF/fantasy anthology The Cosmic Book #1 (Dec. 1986), under the imprint Wandering Star Press; issues of Blood of Dracula for Apple Press in 1988 and 1989; and inking penciler Howard Simpson on the 21-page story "White Men Speak with Forked Tongue (Jurassic Politics part 2)" in Acclaim Comics' Turok, Dinosaur Hunter #18 (Dec. 1994).

His last known comics work was penciling and inking the three-page story "The Head of Joaquin Murieta" in The Big Book of the Weird Wild West (Aug. 1998), one of DC Comics/Paradox Press's The Big Book of... trade paperback series.

=== Death ===
Boyette died in Fort Worth, Texas, of cancer of the esophagus. He was predeceased by his wife, Betty or Bette (sources differ). The couple had a daughter, Melissa.
