= Nick Cuti =

American comics creator (1944–2020)

Nicola Cuti
- Born: October 29, 1944 New York City, U.S.
- Died: February 21, 2020 (aged 75)
- Areas: Writer, Artist, Inker, Editor
- Pseudonym: Chuck Robinson
- Notable works: E-Man, Moonchild, Captain Cosmos, Moonie
- Awards: Ray Bradbury Award (twice); Inkpot Award, 2009; Bill Finger Award, 2020

Nicola Cuti (October 29, 1944 – February 21, 2020), known as Nick Cuti, was an American artist and comic book writer/editor, science-fiction novelist; he was the co-creator of E-Man (with artist Joe Staton) and Moonchild, Captain Cosmos, and Starflake the Cosmic Sprite. He also worked as an animation background designer, magazine illustrator, and screenwriter.

== Biography ==
=== Early life ===
Nicola Cuti was born on October 29, 1944, in Brooklyn, New York, the first of two sons of Alphonso Gitano Cuti, a darkroom technician, and Laura Antoinette Sica, a housewife. His grandparents had emigrated from Italy in the 1930s to make a home in America. His brother, Emil, was a medical technician and later sold medical supplies to hospitals.

He served in the United States Air Force as an air policeman from 1966 to 1972, stationed at Toul-Rosières Air Base, France; Çiğli, Turkey; and Bangor, Maine. His first published work, a comic strip, was published in a French magazine, Singular-Plural, and his first published story, “Grub” was published in Creepy magazine while he was on active status in Bangor.

After leaving the service, his first employment was at Krantz Animation Studio in New York City, which was under the direction of the legendary filmmaker Ralph Bakshi.

In 1972, while visiting his parents in Florida, he met Charlene Veselsky on the flight, and they were married six months later. Together they had a daughter, Jaymee, who worked as a journalist and at the time of Nick Cuti's death in 2020 was in the publicity department of the Portland, Oregon Water Department. Nick and Charlene were divorced in 1995.

=== Moonchild ===
Starting in 1968, he self-published three underground comix featuring his first original character, Moonchild, a big-eyed, buxom innocent waif who had the ability to live in outer space without any life support systems. (Issue #2 of Moonchild was published in conjunction with Gary Arlington's San Francisco Comic Book Company.) She was also featured in Mark Estren's book A History of the Underground Comics, in the first underground comic in full color, Weird Fantasies and in several issues of Cheri magazine. The character was then published as a three issue limited series, under the name Moonie, Moonchild the Starbabe, by MU Press with covers, writing, editing, pencils by Cuti and inks and lettering by Dave Simons.

Cuti had long admired the work of comic artist Wally Wood and asked if Wood would look at his portfolio. Cuti did a single-page comic strip featuring Moonchild but it was never published in Wood's magazine Witzend; however, Cuti eventually became Wood's studio assistant at the Wood Studio in Valley Stream, Long Island. He worked on the strips Cannon and Sally Forth for Wood.

When Charlton Comics was seeking an assistant editor, Cuti was interviewed by the new editor, George Wildman, and was hired. He worked for Charlton for four years and worked as assistant editor for Louise Simonson at Warren Publishing and then as assistant editor to Len Wein at DC Comics.

In 1986 a friend, Bill DuBay, had taken a job as art director for Marvel Films in California and invited Cuti to work as a background artist. Excited at the prospect of working in the animation field, Cuti moved his wife and daughter to California. For the next sixteen years he found employment as a freelance background designer for such studios as the Walt Disney Company, Universal Studios, Sony Pictures, Sunbow Entertainment, and many more working on such projects as Conan the Adventurer, Defenders of the Earth, 101 Dalmatians, Dilbert, Exo-Squad, Starship Troopers, and many other TV series.

Cuti moved to Florida where he began writing and shooting indie movies for Creature Productions and then for his own company Ni-Cola Entertainment LLC. His big dream was to produce a movie based on his character Moonie, but he knew it would take a fortune to do Moonie properly, so he shelved the idea.

In 2012, it was announced that the comic miniseries story "Moonie vs the Spider Queen" would be adapted by Temple of the Cave's Temple Immersive Audio as an AudioDrop, a short-form audio production. It was scheduled for release in April 2012. The production features Tom Nagel and Michael Cornacchia and is scripted and directed by Eric Paul Erickson from the original story by Cuti.

Bill Black, a friend and fellow indie movie maker, had suggested to Cuti that instead of trying to produce a high-budget version of Moonchild he should do it in episodes and use each episode as a means to finance the next episode. On September 12, 2012, Cuti began shooting the first episode of a three-part movie entitled Moonie and the Spider Queen, Episode One. The movie starred Nikoma DeMitro as Moonie, Anthony Wayne and William August as the space pilots. The shooting by cinematographer, Wheat, was completed on September 15. It was then edited by Randy Carter and composited with special effects by Stuart Scoon. The movie premiered on 16 August 2013 at the Fetish Convention, held in Tampa Bay and was put on sale on Amazon.com.

In 2018, Cuti sold the Moonchild franchise to Nakoma DeMitro. The series is being rebooted with no known tentative release date.

=== Charlton (1972–1976) ===
In 1972, when he was hired as the assistant to George Wildman, editor of the Charlton Comics in Derby, Connecticut. Charlton was a low-paying outfit that nonetheless produced a variety of comic book genres from 1946 until its demise in 1986, even after most publishers had long since turned to a steady diet of superhero titles.

Cuti began turning out scripts for Charlton's horror and fantasy titles, working with artists such as Steve Ditko, Don Newton, Wayne Howard and Tom Sutton. He recruited younger artists such as John Byrne and Mike Zeck, who began freelancing for Charlton and illustrated some of Cuti's stories. In less than three years, Cuti produced well over 200 story scripts and text features for Charlton.

In 1973, he teamed with Joe Staton, who collaborated with him in the creation of E-Man, a naive alien superhero who became a cult favorite. The character epitomized Cuti's disdain for the melodramatic, cape-wearing superheroes of other publishers. Cuti and Staton also co-created Michael Mauser, a grubby and uncouth private investigator, who began as an extra in E-Man but was quickly spun off into a series of his own. Both characters survived the implosion of Charlton and continue to the present, with Cuti and Staton collaborating on one-shots and series of new E-Man and Michael Mauser comics and stories.

=== Post-Charlton ===
Cuti left Charlton in 1976 and went back to work for Warren, producing more than 100 story scripts for Warren's horror and fantasy magazines, until that company's demise in the early 1980s. At various times he held the positions of contributing editor, assistant editor and consulting editor.

During the same period, he taught himself the medium of scratchboard, emulating an artist he admired, Frank Kelly Freas. Cuti developed a realistic scratchboard style in contrast to his inked cartoon style and began selling illustrations to mainstream magazines such as Alfred Hitchcock's Mystery Magazine, Analog, Amazing Stories and Heavy Metal.

After he left Warren, Cuti became an assistant editor and then digest editor at DC Comics, handling various superhero and children's titles and scripting his own six-part space opera, Spanner's Galaxy, illustrated by Tom Mandrake. He also scripted the final two Creeper back-up stories that appeared in The Flash.

Cuti moved to California in 1986 to begin work for animated TV series, producing background and prop designs for a dozen different studios, including Disney, Sony Pictures and Universal Studios. At the same time, he continued to write comic book scripts and create magazine and book art in both scratchboard and paint.

Captain Cosmos, Cuti's homage to the TV space operas of his childhood, appeared in a series of comic books created in collaboration with Staton and also in Cuti's novel, Spin a Web of Death, three radio dramas and three short TV films. Moonchild returned to print in a three-part comic series in 1992 as Moonie, Moonchild the Starbabe and as novels in 2003. At a convention, his friend, partner, and actress for Moonie, Nakoma DeMitro, suggested he write a series for young girls since there wasn’t much out there for them in the science fiction field and Starflake the Cosmic Sprite was born. Like Moonie, she could live in outer space without any life support.

=== Films ===
In 2003, Cuti moved to Florida, where he scripted for independent films—some adapted from his Charlton and Warren scripts—and consolidated his Captain Cosmos TV series into a full-length feature film, Captain Cosmos and the Gray Ghosts. Films produced and written by Cuti include Grub, Shock House, Tagged!, The Lady Without Substance and Moonie and the Spider Queen.

=== Novels ===
Cuti wrote and illustrated text novels with his character "Moonie" as the heroine, Moonie and the Spider Queen (2009) (inks by Dave Simons), Moonie in the Slave Market of Opuul (2010) (inks by Mark Stegbauer), Moonie in Too Many Moons (2010) (inks by Mark Stegbauer) and Moonie Moonie Goes to War. A fifth novel, Moonie and the Space Pirates, was written by a friend of Cuti's, Vic Stonecypher.

Eventually, Cuti decided he had done all he could with Moonie, the Starbabe, and sold the series to DeMitro in order to concentrate on his newest creation, Starflake, the Cosmic Sprite. A contest was initiated to find a model for Starflake and Alicia Sage won the title. He wrote seven Starflake novels including, Starflake rides with the Galactic Bikers, Starflake hunts the Power Beast, and Starflake picks the Junkyard Planet. A Starflake Comic series was also created and published by his good friend Kevin Glover. He was working on a young adult series of Starflake titled Starflake, Deep Space Ranger.

== Awards ==
Cuti was twice awarded Warren’s Ray Bradbury Award for writing. In 2009, Cuti was awarded the Inkpot Award for career achievement and was given the award at San Diego Comic-Con. In 2020 he posthumously was awarded the Bill Finger Award along with fellow honorees Virginia Hubbell, Leo Dorfman, Gaylord DuBois, Joe Gill, and France Herron.

== Death ==
Cuti died of cancer on February 21, 2020, in Tampa, Florida; survived by his daughter Jayme Rose and his brother Emil.
