= Pete Morisi =

American comic writer

- Born: Peter A. Morisi; January 7, 1928 Brooklyn, New York, U.S.
- Died: October 12, 2003 (aged 75) Staten Island, New York, U.S.
- Areas: Writer, Penciller
- Pseudonym: PAM
- Notable works: Peter Cannon, Thunderbolt

Peter Anthony Morisi (January 7, 1928 – October 12, 2003), who sometimes went by the pseudonym PAM, was an American comic book writer and artist who also spent much of his professional life as a New York City Police Department officer. He is best known as creator of the 1960s Charlton Comics series Peter Cannon ... Thunderbolt, a thoughtful superhero comic that contained some of the earliest respectful invocations of Eastern mysticism in American pop culture.

== Biography ==
=== Early life and career ===
Born and reared in the Park Slope neighborhood of Brooklyn, New York, Morisi was educated at the School of Industrial Art and the Cartoonists and Illustrators School, both in Manhattan. He broke into comics as an assistant on the comic strips Dickie Dare and The Saint, and had just started at Fox Comics in 1948 when he was drafted and served as a private in the U.S. Army through 1950. Comics historian Mark Evanier has written that Morisi worked in the Harvey Comics production department alongside future comics artist Don Heck in 1949. Stationed in Colorado, Morisi wrote for such Fox romance and crime comics as Feature Presentations Magazine and Murder Incorporated.

On his return, Morisi freelanced for companies including Comic Media, Harvey Comics, Fiction House, Lev Gleason Publications, Nesbitt Publishers, Quality Comics, Toby Press and the Marvel Comics precursors Timely and Atlas, where his work appeared in titles including the Westerns Arizona Kid, Cowboy Romances and Texas Kid, and the horror/suspense anthologies Astonishing, Journey into Mystery, Marvel Tales, Strange Tales and Uncanny Tales. In 1954, when editor-in-chief Stan Lee expressed admiration for the cover artist of some Comic Media books, Morisi brought in the artist, his friend and future Silver Age star Heck.

=== Police force and Peter Cannon ===
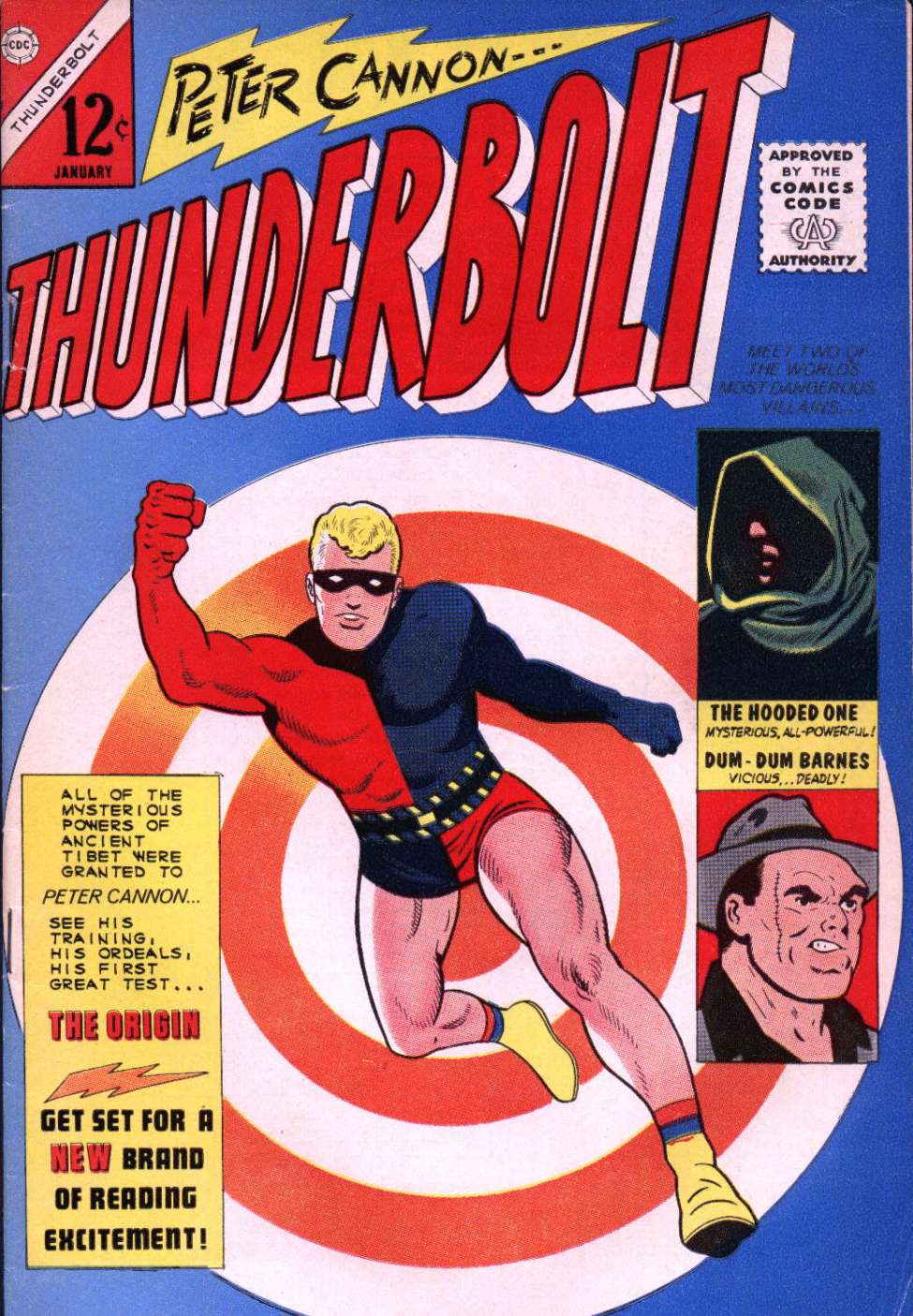
Peter Cannon ... Thunderbolt #1 (Aug. 1966), art by Pete Morisi

In 1956, Morisi fulfilled a childhood dream of joining the police force, and became an NYPD cop stationed in Brooklyn and in lower Manhattan. To avoid the department knowing he was moonlighting, however legally, Morisi began signing his work only with his initials – PAM, the "M" rendered without connectors, as "|||". He retired from the force in 1976.

Morisi's character Thunderbolt debuted in Peter Cannon ... Thunderbolt #1 (Jan. 1966), part of Charlton editor Dick Giordano's "Action Heroes" superhero line. The series then took over the numbering of the defunct title Son of Vulcan, and ran from issue #51–60 (March–April 1966 – Nov. 1967), by which time Morisi, time-pressed with police work, had turned it over to other hands. When DC Comics bought the rights to Charlton's superhero properties in 1983, Thunderbolt was one of the characters originally planned for use in writer Alan Moore's miniseries Watchmen; when DC chose to save those characters for other uses, Moore adapted him into Ozymandias (Adrian Veidt).

DC published the 12-issue, slightly retitled miniseries Peter Cannon – Thunderbolt (Sept. 1992 – Aug. 1993) by writer-penciler Mike Collins and inker José Marzan Jr. Rights to the character later reverted to Morisi.

A later incarnation, Peter Cannon, Thunderbolt, was published by Dynamite Entertainment for ten issues from September 2012 to July 2013, by Alex Ross, co-writer Steve Darnall, and Jonathan Lau. A trade paperback omnibus edition reprinting all ten issues was published by Dynamite Entertainment in March 2015, including a complete cover gallery and the origin story by Peter Cannon: Thunderbolt creator, Pete Morisi.

== Critical reputation ==
English professor, columnist and critic Ken Parille in The Comics Journal writes that in comparison to the dynamism most associated with comics art, Morisi embraced "a deliberate sense of stillness":

Much of his energy lives not in panel-to-panel flow but in the framed confines of the panel, in flat images on lifeless pages. ... His peculiar genius lies in the way he seems to disrupt our desire to glide across a page. While it's hard to talk about the specific effect that images have on us, many of his panels feel calming, almost a little hypnotic and "sculptural" ... The characters' faces and the comic's text reveal an odd disconnect: the dialogue and narration convey the situation's drama, yet the facial expressions don't. People stare off somewhere beyond the panel, disengaged from the plot and from each other, counteracting the intensity that the text's many exclamations points are supposed to carry. This disconnect lends Morisi's Charlton work an odd, subdued pathos."

Morisi is one of several artists featured in Dan Nodel's Art in Time where he is praised for his "highly economical and even refined comic book storytelling".

== Personal life ==
Morisi settled in the Dongan Hills section of New York City's Staten Island borough in 1973. There he drew illustrations for the column "Staten Island Stats" in the local newspaper The Staten Island Advance. His wife of 53 years, the former Louise Massie, died in May 2003. They had three sons: Steven, Russ, and Val. He died at Staten Island University Hospital.
