= George Wildman =

American cartoonist

- Born: July 31, 1927
- Died: May 23, 2016 (aged 88)
- Areas: Cartoonist, Penciller, Inker, Editor
- Notable works: Popeye
- Awards: National Cartoonists Society, "Best Cartoonist, Humor Division"; Popeye Fan Club's Lifetime Achievement Award

George Wildman (July 31, 1927 – May 22, 2016) was an American cartoonist most noted for his work in the comic books industry. From 1971 until 1985, he was a top editor at Charlton Comics, where he also became the long-time regular artist on Popeye comic books.

== Biography ==
=== Early life and career ===
Wildman, a lifelong resident of Connecticut, served in the United States Navy in both World War II and the Korean War. During World War II, he worked as a Navy recruiter, and after the end of World War II, he joined the Naval Reserves. Recalled to duty in Korea, he served on the USS New Jersey.

Returning home, Wildman studied advertising at what later became the Paier College of Art. In the 1950s, he worked as a commercial artist, first at an ad agency and then as a freelance artist. During this time, he began producing art for Charlton Comics in Derby, Connecticut.

=== Popeye ===
When King Comics ceased publication of its Popeye title, Charlton acquired the rights. Longtime writer-artist Bud Sagendorf was busy with both the daily comic strip and Sunday newspaper comic strips and declined the job of continuing. Wildman was offered a contract to draw the Popeye comic, with Joe Gill scripting. The first Charlton issue of Popeye was published in 1969, the final one in 1977. Hired as an assistant editor to Sal Gentile, Wildman was promoted in 1971 to managing editor and eventually executive editor. Assistant editor Nicola Cuti wrote several of the later Popeye scripts for Charlton.

Wildman's tenure as editor continued through 1985, while Western Publishing picked up Popeye under its Gold Key and Whitman trademarks. Bill Pearson, by then assistant editor at Charlton, began writing scripts, and Wildman produced illustrations while off-duty from Charlton.

In 1979, the release of Robert Altman's Popeye film led to a demand for Popeye-related merchandise. For Random House, Wildman illustrated a "Pop-Up Book" that was later displayed at the Smithsonian Institution. Wildman was also invited to produce a painted wooden Easter egg for the White House Easter event; this egg was also donated to the Smithsonian.

=== Freelance ===
Western Publishing ceased its comics line in the early 1980s, and Wildman retired from Charlton Comics in 1985, moving into a freelance comic book and children's book illustration career. His pencils, inks and paints graced publications featuring Disney, Hanna-Barbera, Harvey and Warner Bros. characters along with countless designs for various businesses.

In 1994, Wildman and his wife Trudy were guests of honor at a festival in Chester, Illinois, celebrating the 100th birthday of Popeye's creator, Elzie Crisler Segar. Wildman received the Popeye Fan Club's Lifetime Achievement Award. Wildman was also a guest of the 2004 festival, which celebrated the 75th anniversary of Popeye.

As of the late 2000s, Wildman and his son Karl operated their own ad agency, producing computer animation, greeting cards and other products. Wildman's work was seen regularly in the "Hidden Pictures" of Highlights for Children.

== Awards ==
The National Cartoonists Society awarded him "Best Cartoonist, Humor Division" in 1981. His contributions have been recognized with a nomination for the Shazam Award for Best Penciller (Humor Division) in 1974, and another nomination for the Shazam Award for Best Inker (Humor Division) that same year.

== Death ==
George Wildman died at the age of 88 on May 22, 2016.
