= Joe Gill =

Comic book writer and artist

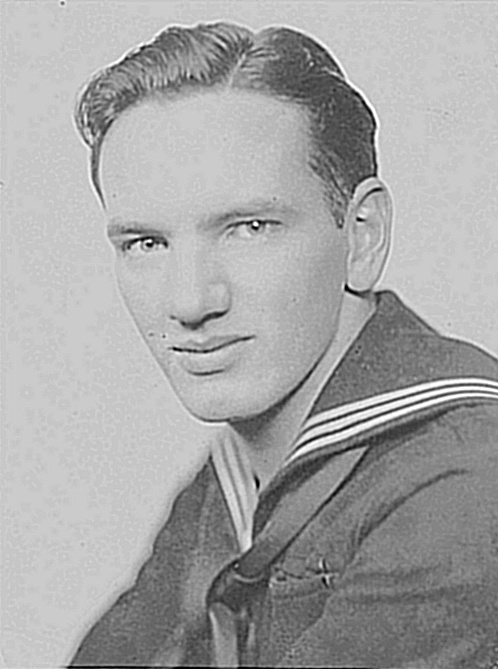
- Joe Gill in sailor's uniform, 1940s on board the USS Cavalier APA 37
- Born: Joseph P. Gill; July 13, 1919 Scranton, Pennsylvania, U.S.
- Died: December 17, 2006 (aged 87) Seymour, Connecticut, U.S.
- Areas: Writer, Colourist
- Notable works: Captain Atom, Judomaster, Peacemaker
- Awards: Bill Finger Award 2020 (posthumously)

Joseph P. Gill (July 13, 1919 – December 17, 2006) was an American magazine writer and highly prolific comic book scripter. Most of his work was for Charlton Comics, where he co-created the superheroes Captain Atom, Peacemaker, and Judomaster, among others. Comics historians consider Gill a top contender as the comic-book field's most prolific writer. Per historian and columnist Mark Evanier, Gill "wrote a staggering number of comics. There are a half-dozen guys in his category. If someone came back and said he was the most prolific ever, no one would be surprised."

== Biography ==
=== Early life and career ===
Born in Scranton, Pennsylvania, Gill began writing for comic books for the New York City-based Timely Comics, the first predecessor of Marvel Comics, during the 1940s period fans and historians call the Golden Age of Comic Books. The vast majority of his work went unsigned, both in the manner of that time and during his staff-writing position at one company from the 1950s to 1980s, making a comprehensive bibliography difficult or impossible to compile.

In addition, Gill's Timely stories were actually written, often pseudonymously for Funnies, Inc., an outsourced "packager" that created comics on demand for publishers testing the waters of the then-new medium. His earliest confirmed credit is the one-page text story "Following Orders" in Novelty Press' Target Comics vol. 8, #11 (#89), cover-dated January 1948.

As Gill recalled his start in the business, via his brother, Ray Gill, "My brother was an editor at Funnies, Inc., an editorial service that packaged comics for publishers. They put [publisher] [Martin] Goodman – who [owned] Marvel later – into comics, and did the first [comics] in my brother's office". Gill is reportedly among the writers who scripted Captain America for Timely following the departure of character creators Joe Simon and Jack Kirby in late 1941.

Around this time, Gill met future hardboiled detective novelist Mickey Spillane, a lifelong friend, who also began writing for Funnies, Inc. Following military service in World War II as a U.S. Navy radio operator – in which according to family lore Gill's ship was torpedoed by a Japanese submarine and Gill's signaling for help amid the sinking led to the rescue of many hands.

Spillane and Ray Gill insisted Joe go into freelance writing with them. When superheroes fell out of favor in the post-war years, Gill began scripting teen-humor, Western and other genre comics for Timely. Following an industry downturn around 1948, he eventually found his way to the low-budget comic-book publisher Charlton Comics, based in Derby, Connecticut.

=== Charlton Comics and the Silver Age ===
At Charlton, beginning in the early 1950s, Gill became the company's primary staff writer for the next thirty years. He was known for his speed, often finishing a full-length comics script in a day and writing as much as an estimated 100 to 125 pages a week across a number of genres, from crime fiction to science fiction, romance to war stories. Superheroes were a minor part of Charlton; Gill created one of its first, Zaza the Mystic. He also did colorist work for the company.

In 1960, as the industry was returning to superheroes for what would become known as the Silver Age of comic books, Gill and the soon-to-be-legendary co-creator of Marvel Comics' Spider-Man, Steve Ditko, created the astronaut-turned-atomic-hero Captain Atom in the sci-fi anthology title Space Adventures #33 (March 1960).

The character would eventually become a stalwart of the DC stable, as would Blue Beetle, an old Fox Comics superhero revived by Gill and artists Bill Fraccio and Tony Tallarico as a campy, comedic character in Blue Beetle #1 (June 1964).

In 1967, Charlton editor Dick Giordano introduced the company's "Action Hero" superhero line, with new characters that included Gill and artist Pat Boyette's The Peacemaker as well as Gill and company art director Frank McLaughlin's Judomaster. In other areas, he collaborated with Ditko on the giant-ape series Konga and on the movie-spinoff series Gorgo.

=== Later life and career ===
Gill in his later years, holding a copy of Mike Danger

When Giordano was hired at industry leader DC Comics in 1969, he commissioned scripts from Gill for such titles as The Secret Six and the toy-license property Hot Wheels. Gill continued to work regularly at Charlton throughout this period, notably on the ongoing Vietnam War feature "Shotgun Harker and Chicken" for Charlton's war title Fightin' Marines.

In 1975, Gill and artist John Byrne co-created the post-apocalyptic series Doomsday + 1 (1976–1977), the first series-creator credit for future industry-star Byrne.

In 1983, Gill wrote two stories featuring Secret Agent X-9 for King Features Syndicate. These stories were illustrated by Jack Sparling and only saw print in European comic books.

When Charlton Comics ceased publication in 1986, Gill retired from comic-book scripting save for an occasional freelance story for DC. His final recorded credit is as one of the colorists on the small-press superhero comic Ebony Warrior #2 (June–July 1993), published by Ania. He appeared as a guest, with fellow Charlton alumni Willie Franz and Sam Glanzman, at a New York City comics convention panel, broadcast November 21, 2000, on the WBAI radio show 'Nuff Said!

Gill, who suffered from complications from a fall at the Shady Knoll Health Center in Seymour, Connecticut, and who in the last part of his life spent much time at the Doyle Senior Center, playing pool in the morning and poker in the afternoon, died of undisclosed causes at age 87 in Seymour. There was no funeral, according to his wishes, and his only surviving relative, niece Carol Anderson, took his ashes to a cemetery in Bridgeport, Connecticut, where his wife and son are buried.

== Awards ==
- 1974 Shazam Award – nomination for Best Writer (Humor Division)
- 2020 Bill Finger Award posthumously
