= Don Lomax =

American comic book writer/artist (born 1944)

- Born: September 14, 1944 (age 82) Illinois, U.S.
- Areas: Writer, Artist, Inker
- Notable works: Vietnam Journal
- Spouse: Zenaida

Don Lomax (born 1944) is an American comic book writer/artist best known for his long-running comic Vietnam Journal. A veteran of the Vietnam War, much of Lomax's adrenaline-fueled work centers on the military experience, and its gritty, unflinching depiction of the reality of war, specifically in Vietnam.

== Biography ==
=== Early life ===
Growing up in Bushnell, Illinois, Lomax's artistic influences included Jack Davis and Berni Wrightson, as well as the war comics Two-Fisted Tales and Blazing Combat.

=== Military service ===
Drafted into the U.S. Army in the fall of 1965, Lomax did his basic training at Fort Knox. In the fall of 1966, he was shipped out to Vietnam on the USS General John Pope, deployed to the 98th Light Equipment Maintenance Company. During his tour of duty, Lomax made notes and sketches which later were incorporated into Vietnam Journal. According to Lomax, the War ". . . opened my eyes. Before I went into the war I trusted everybody, and when I came out I trusted nobody or the government."

=== Comics ===
Lomax's first professional comics work was Atilla the Frog for Heavy Metal magazine in 1979. In the early 1980s, he published comics stories in magazines like Cavalier and Hustler Humor, as well as contributing to Fantagraphics' Anything Goes!. Lomax supplied art for Pacific Comics' Twisted Tales, and for back-up stories in First Comics titles like American Flagg!, Starslayer, and The Black Flame.

==== Vietnam Journal and Desert Storm Journal ====
In 1987, after doing some work for the fledgling publisher Apple Comics, Lomax pitched Apple editor Michael Catron his proposal for Vietnam Journal. Given the concurrent success of Vietnam-related films like Platoon and Full Metal Jacket, Catron agreed to Lomax's proposal. Between 1987 and 1991, Apple published 16 issues of Vietnam Journal, which then spawned a selection of limited series and one-shots. Vietnam Journal tells the fictional adventures of war correspondent Scott "Journal" Neithammer.

During this period, Apple also published Lomax's four-issue limited series High Shining Brass, collecting the Vietnam War stories of Robert Durand.

Vietnam Journal collections were published by Apple Comics in 1987 and 1991. The publisher went bankrupt in 1994; right at that time Lomax published new Vietnam Journal material in the short-lived Dark Horse Comics series Harvey Kurtzman's The New Two-Fisted Tales. Vietnam Journal was later revived as a monthly full-page strip from 2002 to 2006 by Gallery.

Vietnam Journal collections were re-issued by iBooks in 2004, and were nominated for a 2004 Harvey Award for Best Domestic Reprint Project. Lomax was at the time continuing the Vietnam Journal series and posting it on his website in five-page increments twice a month. The entire Vietnam Journal series was re-issued in graphic novel form through Transfuzion Publishing.

Lomax's Desert Storm Journal, published in 9 issues by Apple Comics from September 1991 to March 1993, covered the Gulf War. Scott "Journal" Neithammer gets caught up in the war between the Pentagon and the press, and heads off into the desert on his own, getting an unwelcome first-hand taste of the fury of American firepower. In 2004, iBooks published Lomax's Gulf War Journal, collecting material from Desert Storm Journal.

Years later, Journal once again finds himself dealing with the war in Iraq with the launching of Operation Iraqi Freedom.

Vietnam Journal: Series Two, featuring all-new material by Lomax, was published for 15 issues by Caliber Comics starting in 2017.

==== Other comics work ====
In 1992–1993, Lomax wrote Marvel Comics' Vietnam comic The 'Nam, as well as providing inks for their comic Sleepwalker, The Punisher, and others.

He has also had comics and cartoons appear in dozens of national magazines, including Easyriders, Heavy Metal, CARtoons, various truck magazines, and numerous pornographic magazines.

His weekly comic, "Boomer Hayes" is created in collaboration with Steven Calitri of American Towman Magazine.

Some of Lomax's recent and ongoing projects include Guard Tales, a nonfiction strip about National Guard of the United States soldiers published in GX Magazine; Knights of the Road, a nonfiction strip about truck driver heroes, published in Overdrive Magazine; Above and Beyond, true stories of law enforcement personnel, published by Police and Security News; and The Boys in the Basement, a strip published in Model Railroading Magazine from 1998 to 2006.

== Personal life ==
Lomax lives in Illinois with his second wife Zenaida ("Zeny"). He has four children, two of whom have also served in the military.

== Bibliography ==
=== Comics ===
- Twisted Tales (issue 4, Aug. 1983)
- Vietnam Journal (16 issues, Nov. 1987–Apr. 1991)
- High Shining Brass (4 issues, 1990–June 1991)
- Survive! (Apple Comics, 1 issue, 1992)
- Vietnam Journal: Tet '68 (6 issues, Mar. 1992 – 1993)
- The 'Nam (issues #70-84, July 1992-Sept. 1993)
- Vietnam Journal: Bloodbath at Khe Sanh (4 issues, 1992–Dec. 1993)
- Vietnam Journal: The Iron Triangle (Apple Comics, 1 issue, 1993)
- Vietnam Journal: Valley of Death (1 issue, June–Aug. 1994)

=== Graphic novels and collections ===
- Vietnam Journal Book One: Indian Country (reprints #1-4, plus original story) (Apple Press, 1990) ISBN 0-927203-02-2
- Vietnam Journal Book Two: The Iron Triangle (reprints 5–8, plus original story) (Apple Press, 1991) ISBN 0-927203-06-5
- Vietnam Journal: Delta to Dak To (reprints 9–12) (Apple Press, 1991) ISBN 0-927203-07-3
- Gulf War Journal (reprints #1-9) (iBooks, 2004) ISBN 0-7434-8669-2
- Burlington Route Tower Cartoonist (Boys in the Basement collection; South Platte Press, 2004) ISBN 0-942035-65-8
- Vietnam Journal Book One: Indian Country (Transfuzion Publishing, 2009) ISBN 978-0-941613-81-1
- Vietnam Journal Book Two: the Iron Triangle (Transfuzion Publishing, 2010) ISBN 978-0-941613-32-3
- Vietnam Journal Book Three: From the Delta to Dak To (Transfuzion Publishing, 2010) ISBN 978-0-9826549-1-0
- Vietnam Journal Book Four: MIA (Transfuzion Publishing, 2010) ISBN 978-0-941613-76-7
- Vietnam Journal Book Five: Tet '68 (Transfuzion Publishing, 2010) ISBN 978-0-9826549-5-8
- Vietnam Journal Book Six: Bloodbath at Khe Sanh (Transfuzion Publishing, 2011) ISBN 978-0-9826549-6-5
- Vietnam Journal Book Seven: Valley of Death (Transfuzion Publishing, 2011) ISBN 978-0-9826549-7-2
- Vietnam Journal Series Two, Book One: Incursion (Caliber Publishing, 2017) ISBN 978-1635299847
- Vietnam Journal Series Two, Book Two: Journey into Hell (Caliber Publishing, 2018) ISBN 978-1635299267
- Vietnam Journal Series Two, Book Three: Ripcord (Caliber Publishing, 2020) ISBN 978-1635298581

== Notes ==
Preceded by Chuck Dixon	The 'Nam writer 1992–1993	Succeeded by N/A
