= Apple Comics =

Former American comic publisher

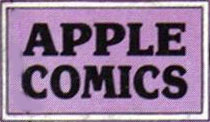
- Industry: Comics
- Founded: 1986; 40 years ago
- Founder: Michael Catron
- Defunct: 1994; 32 years ago
- Headquarters: Bethel, Connecticut, U.S.
- Divisions: Forbidden Fruit

Apple Comics, also known as Apple Press, was an American comic book publisher which operated from 1986 to 1994. Founded by Michael Catron, it began by taking over the publishing elements of comic production from WaRP Graphics before expanding into its own titles while WaRP resumed publishing its own titles. Apple was known for publishing war comics, particularly its long-running title Vietnam Journal (as well as many spin-offs and one-shots).

Other notable titles published by Apple included Blood of Dracula, Desert Storm Journal, Eagle, FantaSci, Fish Police, Myth Conceptions, Thunderbunny, and Vox. Creators associated with Apple included Don Lomax, Lee Marrs, Aaron McClellan, Ken Mitchroney, Steven Moncuse, Rickey Shanklin, Neil Vokes, Mark Wheatley, and John Workman.

== History ==
=== Origins ===
In 1986, Richard Pini turned over all of WaRP's publishing and marketing duties to Apple so that WaRP could concentrate on editing comics. While still featuring the WaRP logo on their covers, the indicia of FantaSCI #2, MythAdventures #10, Thunderbunny #6, and Unicorn Isle #2 listed themselves as "published bi-monthly by Apple Press Inc." Their next issues featured both the WaRP and Apple Comics logos on the cover, along with a note from the new publisher, Michael Catron, including an explanation of the arrangement:

Broadly speaking, WaRP handles all the creative details involved in preparing each issue for publication and Apple handles all of the business and production details. Richard remains editor on all titles. It's his job to edit each issue, work with the creators to help them do their best, and generally see to it that everything lives up to the standards WaRP has set — that's why the "WaRP Graphics" imprint will continue to appear on the cover of every issue WaRP prepares for Apple.

In March 1987 (originally promised for October 1986), Apple began publishing the eight-issue mini-series Elfquest: Siege at Blue Mountain, which ran until December 1988. Also in 1987, Apple began publishing original titles, including Blood of Dracula, Myth Conceptions, and Vietnam Journal. They also picked up the title Space Ark from Americomics, and in 1988 picked up Eagle from Crystal Publications.

=== Forbidden Fruit ===
From 1991–1994, Apple published an erotic comics imprint known as Forbidden Fruit. Titles published by Forbidden Fruit included The Adventures Of Misty, Case Morgan, Gumshoe Private Eye (reprinting material by Don Lomax featured in Gent), Sexy Superspy, and Sindy.

=== End of Apple Comics ===
The comics market meltdown of 1994 hit the small press very hard, and Apple Comics was forced to close its doors. Its final issue was Vietnam Journal: Valley of Death #2, published in August 1994.

== Titles ==
=== Apple Comics ===
- 101 Other Uses for a Condom (1991), #1
- The Adventures of Roma (January 1993), #1
- The Bat (March 1990), #1
- Big Bad Blood of Dracula (July 1991–September 1991), #1–2
- Blazing Combat: Vietnam and Korea (1993), #1–2 (reprints from the Warren series)
- Blazing Combat: World War I and World War II (1994), #1–2 (reprints from the Warren series)
- Blood Of Dracula (November 1987–March 1991), #1–19
- Dark Fantasy (September 1992), #1
- Days of Darkness (March 1992-February 1993), #1–6
- Days of Wrath (August 1993–June 1994), #1–4
- Death Dreams of Dracula (September 1991–March 1992), #1–4
- Desert Storm Journal (September 1991–March 1993), #1–9
- Dracula In Hell (January–March 1992), #1–2
- Eagle (July 1988 – 1989), #17–23 (from Crystal Publications)
- ElfQuest: Siege At Blue Mountain (March 1987–December 1988), #1–8 (with Warp Graphics)
- FantaSci (December 1986–December 1987), #2–9 (from/with Warp Graphics)
- Fish Police (August 1989-Spring 1991), #18–26 & #0 (from Comico)
- Fish Shticks (November 1991–March 1993), #1–6
- High Shining Brass (November 1990-June 1991), #1–4
- Invasion '55 (October 1990-May 1991), #1–3
- Lost Frankenstein Pages (August 1993), #1 (from Bernie Wrightson's Frankenstein)
- The Miracle Squad: Blood and Dust (January–June 1989), #1–4
- Mister Fixitt (January 1989-March 1990), #1–2
- MythAdventures (May 1986–October 1986), #10–12 (from/with Warp Graphics)
- Myth Conceptions (November 1987-January 1989), #1–8 (with Warp Graphics)
- The New Crime Files of Michael Mauser Private Eye (January 1992), #1 (from E-Man)
- Retief! (March 1990), TPB (collects Mad Dog Graphics series Keith Laumer's Retief #1–6)
- Space Ark (1987), #3–5 (from Americomics)
- Survive! (April 1992), #1
- Thunderbunny (1986–November 1987), #6–12 (from/with Warp Graphics)
- The Timejump War (October–December 1989), #1–3
- Trollords v3: Death and Kisses ( July 1989-September 1991), #1–6 (from Comico)
- Unicorn Isle (December 1986-May 1987), #2–5 (from/with Warp Graphics)
- Vampiric Jihad (1991), #1
- Vietnam Journal
  - v1 (November 1987–April 1991), #1–16
  - Bloodbath at Khe Sanh (1992-December 1993), #1–4
  - Tet '68 (March 1992 – 1993), #1–6
  - The Iron Triangle (1993), #1
  - Valley of Death (June–August 1994), #1–2
- Vox (June 1989 - July 1990), #1–6

=== Forbidden Fruit ===
- The Adventures Of Misty (1991–1992), #1–12
- Aviatrix (January to May 1992), #1–3
- Bill Ward's Bad Girls (1994), #1
- Case Morgan, Gumshoe Private Eye (1991–1992), #1–11
- Fighting Fem Classics (December 1992–June 1993), #1–4
- Gray Morrow's Private Commissions (1992), #1–2
- Metallica (December 1991 - April 1992), #1–3
- Miranda the Tease (1992), #1–2
- Misty and the Valkyries (1993), #1–2
- Moonchild (January 1992 - November 1992), #1–3
- The Nine Lives of Leather Cat (1993), #1
- Scorchy (April 1992), #1
- Sexy Superspy (November 1990 to August 1991), #1–7
- Sindy (1991), #1–5
- Starlove (1992), #1–2
- Strange Sex Stories (April 1994), #1
- Spaced Out (1992), #1
