= American Eagle Eaglet =

American Eagle Eaglet 31
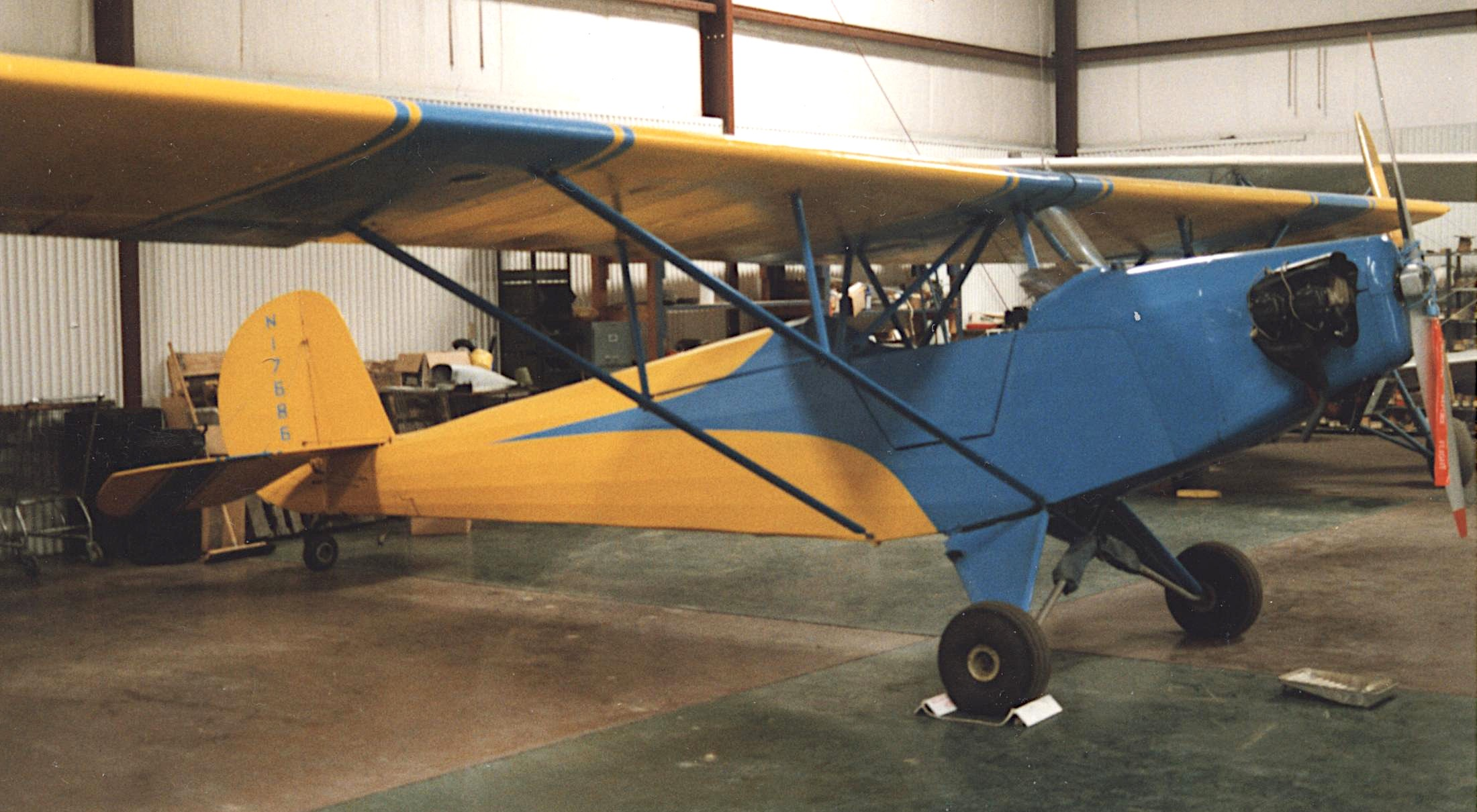
- Eaglet B-31 of 1931 at Santa Fe airfield, New Mexico, in June 1995

General information
- Type: ultra-light sports aircraft
- National origin: United States
- Manufacturer: American Eagle Aircraft Corporation
- Designer: Edward E. Porterfield
- Status: several airworthy in 2009
- Primary user: private pilots
- Number built: approximately 93

History
- Introduction date: 1930
- First flight: June 30, 1930

The Eaglet 31 is a United States two-seat tandem ultra-light high-winged monoplane of the early 1930s. Intended as a low-cost aircraft, its limited production run relegated it to a footnote in aviation history.

== Design and development ==
The American Eagle Aircraft Corporation found that demand for their A-129 biplane and their other models was badly affected by the Wall Street stockmarket crash of late 1929 which ushered in the Great Depression. The small ultra-light, tandem two-seat Eaglet was therefore designed by company president, Edward E. Porterfield, to appeal to pilots with more modest pockets. Porterfield set a realistic goal of manufacturing an aircraft for $1,000. The first advertised price was $995.00.

The first model was the 1930 Eaglet 230, initially powered by the 25 h.p. Cleone engine that flew on June 30, 1930. The engine was so underpowered that only solo flights were possible.

Most later Eaglet 230s featured a 30 h.p. "Zeke" Szekely three-cylinder radial engine. Further experimentation led to fitting a Franklin engine and 60 h.p. Velie. A 40 h.p. Salmson engine was tried but proved to be too expensive to incorporate into the proposed production line. The Szekely eventually ran reliably as an overhead valve 45 h.p. version.

The single Model A-31 of 1931 was fitted with the more powerful Continental A-50 of 50 h.p., and was followed by 13 Model B-31 and B-32 powered by the 45 h.p. Szekely SR-3. The bulk of these examples were produced after the American Eagle company declared bankruptcy and was absorbed by Lincoln Aircraft in May 1931 and reformed as the American Eagle Lincoln Page Aircraft Corporation. The venture was short-lived with the factory closing in 1931.

Production rights to the Eaglet later went to American Eaglecraft who produced three examples from 1940–1947 and rebuilt further aircraft of this design.

== Operational history ==
The various models of the Eaglet were flown prewar by private owner pilots. Approximately 12 original aircraft were in existence in 2001, of which some were still airworthy.

An improved variant of the Eaglet called the Rearwin Junior, was designed by former Eagle employee Doug Webber and went into a limited production in 1931.

== Variants ==
Eaglet 230
30 h.p. Szekely SR-3;
Eaglet 231
40 h.p. Salmson AD-9 (2 modified from model 230);
Eaglet A-31
50 h.p. Continental A-50;
Eaglet B-31 & B-32
45 h.p. Szekely SR-3; (B-32 had minor control modifications)

== Specifications (Eaglet 230) ==
Data from Airlife's World Aircraft

General characteristics

- Crew: one
- Capacity: two
- Length: 21 ft 9 in (6.63 m)
- Wingspan: 34 ft 4 in (10.44 m)
- Height: 7 ft 9 in (2.36 m)
- Empty weight: 467 lb (212 kg)
- Gross weight: 867 lb (393 kg)
- Powerplant: 1 × Szekeley SR-3 , 30 hp (22 kW)

Performance

- Maximum speed: 85 mph (129 km/h, 74 kn)
- Cruise speed: 75 mph (113 km/h, 65 kn)
- Range: 280 mi (450 km, 240 nmi)
- Service ceiling: 10,000 ft (3,000 m)
- Rate of climb: 500 ft/min (3.3 m/s)

== See also ==
Aircraft of comparable role, configuration, and era

- Aeronca C-2
- Curtiss-Wright Junior
- Rearwin Junior
- Spartan C2
