= American Eagle =

American Eagle most commonly refers to:

- Bald eagle
- American Eagle (airline), a brand name under which several regional airlines operate code-sharing flights for American Airlines
- American Eagle Outfitters, a U.S. clothing brand and retail chain

American Eagle may also refer to:

== Coins ==
- American Eagle bullion coins, bullion coins produced by the US Mint
- Eagle (United States coin), a pre-1932 circulation gold coin

== Sports ==
- American Eagles, the athletics teams representing American University
- United States national rugby union team, nicknamed the Eagles
- British Bulldog (game), also known as American Eagle in the U.S.

== Transport ==
- American Eagle (roller coaster), a racing wooden roller coaster at Six Flags Great America in Gurnee, Illinois

=== Automotive ===
- AMC Eagle, a car also known as American Eagle
- North American Eagle, a jet-powered automobile vying for a speed record

=== Aviation ===
- American Eagle Airlines, now Envoy Air, a wholly owned subsidiary of American Airlines Group
- American Eagle Aircraft Corporation, an aircraft design and manufacturing company

=== Ships ===
- American Eagle (schooner), a historic schooner and U.S. National Historic Landmark
- American Eagle (2000 ship), a cruise ship known as American Eagle from 2000 to 2013
- Queen of the Mississippi (2015 ship), a paddlewheel river cruise ship that entered service in 2015, originally American Eagle

== Other ==
- American Eagle (ammunition brand)
- American Eagle (comics), several characters in comics named American Eagle
- Salem Gazette, a US newspaper briefly published as The American Eagle

== See also ==
- Double eagle (United States coin)
- Eagle (disambiguation)
- Half eagle (United States coin)
