= Eagle (comics) =

Eagle, in comics, may refer to:

- Eagle (British comics), a British children's comic from the 1950s and 1960s, revived in the 1980s
- Eagle Comics, a US publisher of comic books reprinting 2000 AD stories
- Eagle (Wildstorm), a Wildstorm character from the series Red Menace
- Eagle, another Wildstorm character from the series Wildsiderz
- Eagle Award (comics), a British comic award also known simply as an Eagle
- Eagle: The Making of an Asian-American President, a manga by Kaiji Kawaguchi
- Richard Eagle, main character of the title Eagle, a black-and-white futuristic and mystical comic series, published by Crystal Comics then Apple Comics

It may also refer to:

- American Eagle (comics), a number of characters
- Angry Eagle, a Marvel Comics character and member of the X-People
- Blue Eagle (character), a superhero
- Eagleman (comics), a DC Comics character
- Eaglet, the sidekick of the Nedor Comics American Eagle
- Golden Eagle (comics), a DC Comics character
- Phantom Eagle, two characters from Fawcett and Marvel Comics

== See also ==
- Eagle (disambiguation)
