= The 'Nam =

Comic book series

- The premiere issue of the series, showing Vietnam split into Soviet-aligned North Vietnam and US-aligned South Vietnam

Publication information
- Publisher: Marvel Comics
- Schedule: Monthly
- Format: Ongoing series
- Genre: Historical, war
- Publication date: December 1986 – September 1993
- No. of issues: 84

Creative team
- Created by: Doug Murray

Collected editions
- Volume 1: ISBN 0-87135-284-2
- Volume 2: ISBN 0-87135-352-0
- Volume 3: ISBN 0-87135-543-4

The 'Nam is a war comic book series detailing the U.S. war in Vietnam from the perspective of active-duty soldiers involved in the conflict. It was initially written by Doug Murray, illustrated by Michael Golden and edited by Larry Hama, and was published by Marvel Comics for seven years beginning in 1986, which was intended to roughly parallel the analogous events of the period of major American military involvement in Vietnam from 1965 to 1973.

== Plot ==
The comic was initially structured as the narrative of a fictional soldier, Private First Class Edward Marks (but sometimes following other characters), as he experiences real events that occurred during the conflict. Each issue of the comic occurs one month after the previous issue, detailing events that occurred approximately 20 years prior to the publication date.

The events depicted are sometimes famous ones, such as the Tet Offensive of 1968, and sometimes more personal ones, depicting the interaction between soldiers or between soldiers and the local populace of Vietnam, or between soldiers and their families, friends and others in the United States.

Some of the stories are typical of those in war comics of any era, such as the interaction with a callous officer or a description of combat, while others are unique to Vietnam, such as the experience of soldiers on leave bearing the personal burden of animosity from civilians opposed to the war. Issue #8 introduced the character of Frank Verzyl, the Tunnel Rat, who appeared again briefly in #26.

== Publication history ==
=== Background and concept ===
Vietnam War veteran Larry Hama contacted fellow vet Doug Murray in 1984 about doing a Vietnam War series for his black-and-white magazine, Savage Tales Vol. 2. Hama teamed Murray up with artist Michael Golden and together they created "The 5th to the 1st", which was well received.

In 1986, Marvel Comics editor-in-chief Jim Shooter approached Hama with a mock-up of a comic book cover that was, as Hama remembers, "a color copy of the artwork from a G.I. Joe cover, one that showed an Infantryman in camo face paint peering through dense jungle foliage. A logo had been pasted over the art that read: THE 'NAM." Shooter told Hama to come up with a book to go along with the cover and produce it. Hama suggested that Murray put together a proposal for a regular comic book about the Vietnam War. Hama specified that the series would play out in real time, such that no one character would remain in the series for longer than 12 issues (since during the Vietnam War soldiers returned home after the completion of a 364-day tour of duty), and that it should be as realistic as possible. Murray has stated that having the series take place in real time was a joint decision between him and Hama. He said, "[l]iterally everybody had a calendar that kept track of how long they had to go in-country. I really wanted a way to kind of reflect that in the comic book." Though he chose Murray and Golden for the series in part because of their having done "The 5th to the 1st", Hama has denied that The 'Nam itself in any way sprang from "The 5th to the 1st", and mentioned that he did not think Shooter was even aware of those stories.

=== Early success ===
Golden was planning to work on Batman for DC Comics when Hama pitched him the concept for the comic book. Golden had grown tired of drawing superheroes and was looking to do something different: "Being part of that generation, I wanted to do this." Murray was surprised when Shooter greenlit the series, but felt that he "wanted to try different experiments in different subgenres". Even then, Murray figured that it might last for 12 issues, but it sold quite well, with the first issue outselling X-Men the month it came out. The series had a publicity coup when The Washington Post did a big write-up on the first issue's release, which was picked up by other newspapers across the country; it was rare that the mainstream press gave significant recognition to doings in the comic book industry.

Murray wanted to work on a Comics Code-approved series in order to reach a broader audience. He said, "I wanted a way to at least tell a part of the story to the kids and maybe get other people to talk about it as well." However, because of the Code, he was not able to address things like drug use or include swearing. Hama and Murray wanted to ignore politics and focus on the war from the average foot soldier's point of view. Murray said that the comic was "a pretty accurate view of the way the average soldier looked at the war. It was outside ordinary experience. The world was elsewhere."

The actions of the 23rd Infantry were based on fact. In particular, most of the stories in the first 13 issues were based on incidents which had happened to Murray or one of his acquaintances during the war. In addition, every issue featured a back-of-the-book glossary explaining the authentic lingo of the characters.

=== Changes in creative team ===
Many changes occurred in the series after the first 12 issues; the use of newsprint was abandoned in favor of slicker paper with higher color intensity. The series went direct market-only with The 'Nam #18. Artist Michael Golden quit the series, and was replaced by Wayne Vansant. Vansant had in fact been involved with the series from before its launch; Hama, who knew Vansant through his work on Savage Tales, told him that though Golden had been chosen as the penciller for The 'Nam, he wanted Vansant in reserve as a fill-in artist, since Golden had a tendency to fall behind on his work. Thus, Vansant drew The 'Nam #7 as a fill-in and was seen as the natural successor to Golden when he left. Vansant said he was so enthusiastic about working on the series that at one point he was seven months ahead on deadlines.

Hama left the series after a year and a half. He was briefly replaced as editor by his assistant, Pat Redding, who maintained similar policies to Hama. However, when Don Daley took over, he wanted to include superheroes and not continue the series in real time. Murray sharply disagreed with Daley over the direction of The 'Nam, in particular the appearance of superheroes in the series. After months of bitter arguments between Murray and Daley, Murray quit, recalling that one of the last straws was when he discovered that Daley had commissioned a The 'Nam script from Chuck Dixon in which a pre-Punisher Frank Castle guest-starred. His run ended with The 'Nam #45, though he briefly returned to write issues #49–51. Though the Punisher story was written during Murray's run, it was not published until a year later, in The 'Nam #52–53 (January–February 1991). Had he continued with the book, Murray wanted the main character from the first year, Ed Marks, to come back to Vietnam as a reporter and deal with the subject of Agent Orange.

From 1988 to 1989, Marvel published ten issues of The 'Nam Magazine, which reprinted in black-and-white the first twenty issues of the comic on magazine-sized paper.

Immediately following Murray's departure, the real time progression of the stories stopped, and the 23rd Infantry squad were dropped as the main characters. Dixon replaced Murray as the regular writer.

=== Final months ===
Daley re-assigned writing duties for The 'Nam to Vietnam veteran Don Lomax, creator of the independent title Vietnam Journal, and directed Vansant to begin inking the series as well as penciling it, both starting with The 'Nam #70 (July 1992). After the series' cancellation, an epilogue of sorts was published in the form of a Punisher special, The Punisher Invades the 'Nam: Final Invasion, which included the unpublished issues #85 and 86.

The character Michael "Ice" Phillips would go on to reappear in The Punisher War Journal #52–53, and The Punisher War Zone #27–30.

== Awards ==
During its run, The 'Nam was nominated for the Best New Series category of the 1987 Jack Kirby Awards.

== Reaction ==
Marine Corps veteran and former Newsweek editor William Broyles Jr. praised the comic for having "a certain gritty reality", but Jan Scruggs, President of the Vietnam Veterans Memorial Fund, questioned if the Vietnam War should be the subject of a comic book and if it might trivialize it. The comic was praised by the Bravo Organization, a notable Vietnam veterans' group, as the "best media portrayal of the Vietnam War", beating out Oliver Stone's Platoon.

== Collected editions ==
- Volume 1 (collects The 'Nam #1–4), 1987, 96 pages, ISBN 0-87135-284-2
- Volume 2 (collects The 'Nam #5–8), 1988, 96 pages, ISBN 0-87135-352-0
- Volume 3 (collects The 'Nam #9–12), 1989, 96 pages, ISBN 0-87135-543-4
- The 'Nam (collects The 'Nam #1–4), 1999, 96 pages, Marvel's Finest, ISBN 0-7851-0718-5
- The 'Nam (collects The 'Nam #1–10), 2009, 248 pages, ISBN 978-0-7851-3750-4
- The 'Nam (collects The 'Nam #11–20), 2010, 240 pages, ISBN 978-0-7851-4957-6
- The 'Nam (collects The 'Nam #21–30 and short stories from Savage Tales Vol. 2 #1 & 4), 2011, 248 pages, ISBN 978-0-7851-5898-1
- Punisher Invades the 'Nam (collects The 'Nam #52–53, #67–69, Punisher Invades The 'Nam: Final Invasion #1, Punisher War Journal #52–53, and Punisher War Zone #26–30), 2018, 352 pages, ISBN 978-1-302-91177-5
- The 'Nam: 1966-1969 Omnibus (collects The 'Nam #1-45 and material from Savage Tales Vol. 2 #1 & 4)), 2025, 1128 pages, ISBN 978-1-302-96524-2
