= Mask of the Red Death (1969 film) =

1969 animated short by Pavao Štalter

Mask of the Red death Maska crvene smrti
- Poster
- Directed by: Pavao Štalter, Branko Ranitović
- Written by: Edgar Allan Poe (original story), Branko Ranitović, Zdenko Gašparović
- Cinematography: Zlatko Sačer
- Music by: Branimir Sakač, Arsen Dedić
- Production company: Zagreb Film
- Release date: 1969
- Running time: 10 minutes
- Country: SFR Yugoslavia
- Language: none

Mask of the Red Death (Croatian: Maska crvene smrti) is a 1969 animated short film by Pavao Štalter (also main animator and main artist) and Branko Ranitović for Zagreb Film. It is an adaptation of Edgar Allan Poe's The Masque of the Red Death.

== Plot ==
A white-robed horseman heralded by flocks of ravens rides through a medieval European kingdom, causing instant death to all who see them. After the horseman claims victims among the peasantry and artisanal class, the clergy attempts to ward them off by self flagellating, but they too succumb. A prince summons all the nobles of the land to a fortress, where they take refuge from the calamity and endulge themselves in merrymaking. After being serenaded by a red-attired jester mocking death, the nobles begin a masquerade ball, only to be surprised by a beautiful woman they have not seen before. The prince is smitten by her, and pursues her to his bedchambers. While they embrace, the woman's features begin to decompose, revealing herself as the horseman the nobles had been striving to escape. The prince draws his dagger, but dies immediately after, leaving the horseman to continue their journey.

== Development ==
The short film is notable for its use of texturized animation, which is difficult to execute convincingly. The authors themselves describe it as a mix of collage technique and "animated paintings". The movie was two years in production.

== Reception ==
Film critic and historian Giannalberto Bendazzi cited it as an example of a movie which would make people genuinely afraid. He praised the painting abilities of Štalter and described the movie as the one which invokes both admiration and disturbance. He called it 'exceptional' and a 'masterpiece of animated horror films'. Some cite it as a potential influence on Terry Gilliam's Monty Python and the Holy Grail, specifically the plague ridden landscape. Film critic Ralph Stephenson described it as "perhaps the most impressive translation of Poe's ghostly world into the cartoon medium".

Due to its innovations in the use of background by mixing painting textures, collage and drawings, it was included in the anthology Art in Movement. It is regarded as among 10 best Croatian animated short films by Croatian film critics.
