= American Eagle A-251 Phaeton =

Phaeton
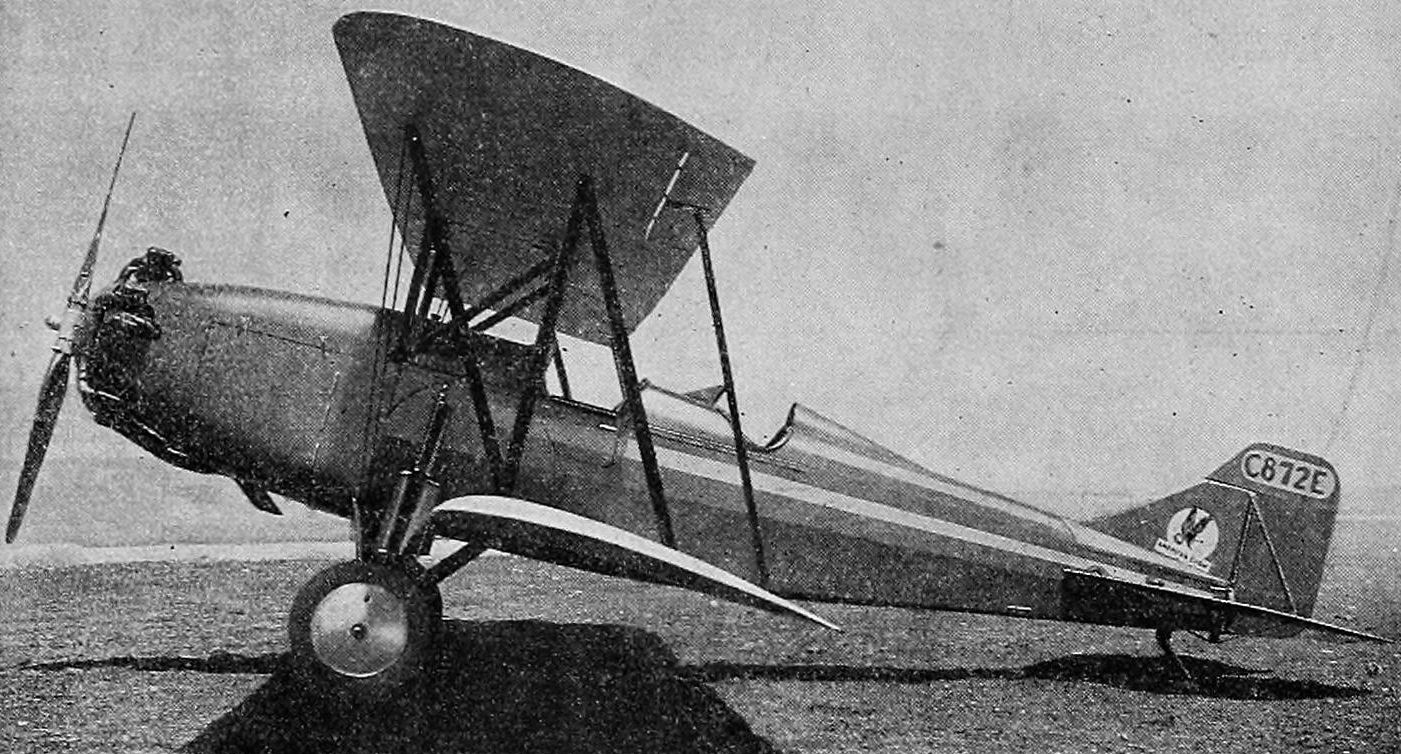
- Wright R-540 powered Phaeton

General information
- Type: Three seat sports aircraft
- National origin: United States
- Manufacturer: American Eagle
- Designer: Robert T. McCrum
- Number built: 34

History
- First flight: 1929

The American Eagle Phaeton was an American three seat, single engine sports biplane produced from 1929 until American Eagle failed financially in 1932. About 34 were built.

== Design and development ==
The Phaeton was designed for the sports pilot rather than for commercial use but was able to carry two passengers. It was an equal span, single bay biplane with interchangeable upper and lower wings joined by N-form interplane struts. Shorter N-struts from the upper fuselage provided a central cabane. The wings were strongly staggered by about half chord They were built around twin spars, with plywood covering from the forward spar forming a torsion-resistant D-box. There were externally interconnected slotted ailerons on both wings.

The first batch of eight Phaetons, produced in 1929, had 165 hp (123 kW) Wright R-540 Whirlwind five cylinder radial engines in the nose with cylinders exposed for cooling. Behind the engine mounting the fuselage was a chrome-molybdenum steel tube structure with fabric covering. The passengers sat side by side in an open cockpit midway over the lower wing, with the pilot well behind the upper trailing edge. Dual controls could be rapidly fitted in the forward cockpit.

Its blunted tip, triangular tailplane was mounted at mid-fuselage height and was in-flight adjustable, with rounded rectangular elevators separated by a gap for rudder movement. The tailplane was strut-braced to a low, ground-adjustable fin with a curved leading edge that carried a blunted rectangular, balanced rudder.

The Phaeton's fixed, split axle undercarriage was conventional with wheels on V-struts from the lower fuselage longerons. long, specially made Rosco ring type shock absorber legs reached from the wheels to the upper longerons.

The Phaeton's engine mountings were designed to accept a variety of engines including the newer nine cylinder, 200–220 hp (150–160 kW) Wright R-790 Whirlwind and the old but cheap, water-cooled Hispano A and B. In 1929 one clipped-wing Phaeton was tested as a racer, then fitted with 200–220 hp (150–160 kW) nine cylinder R-790 Whirlwind engine. Piloted by Jack Foster, this competed in the 1930 National Air Races, resulting in the sale of another 24 similarly powered, though full span, Phaetons.

American Eagle ceased trading in 1932.

== Variants ==
Data from aerofiles

A-251
1929 production with 165 hp (123 kW) R-540 Whirlwinds. 8 built.
A-251
1930 production with 200–220 hp (150–160 kW) R-790 Whirlwinds. 2 built but refitted with R-540s. After the clipped winged Phaeton's appearance in the 1930 Nationals, 24 more R-790-powered but full span Phaetons were built.

== Specifications (1929) ==
Data from Aero Digest August 1929 except where noted

General characteristics

- Crew: one
- Capacity: two passengers
- Length: 24 ft 5 in (7.44 m)
- Wingspan: 31 ft 0 in (9.45 m) both
- Airfoil: Aeromarine 2A
- Fuel capacity: 40 US gal (33 imp gal; 150 L)
- Useful load: 801 lb (363 kg)
- Powerplant: 1 × Wright R-540 Whirlwind 5-cylinder radial engine, 165 hp (123 kW)
- Propellers: 2-bladed

Performance

- Maximum speed: 135 mph (217 km/h, 117 kn)
- Cruise speed: 112 mph (180 km/h, 97 kn)
- Landing speed: 35 mph (56 km/h; 30 kn)
- Take-off: 143 ft (44 m) in 10 s
- Range: 430 mi (690 km, 370 nmi)
- Rate of climb: 816 ft/min (4.15 m/s) to 500 ft (150 m)
