= B arts =

Cultural not-for-profit organisation in Stoke-on-Trent

B arts (Beavers Arts ltd) is a participatory arts organisation based in Stoke-on-Trent. When it was founded in 1985, it was the UK's first female-led outdoor arts company. Originally named Beavers, it was established to "work together as women … at women’s festivals, in women’s centres, community centres, schools, refuges – anywhere that women meet".

== History ==
B arts was founded in 1985 by Gill Gill, Hilary Hughes and Yvon Male. Concerned about a process of theatre-making which at the time often centred around the ‘genius male director’ and one which sidelined women, the trio decided to form a new company and made a commitment to a non-hierarchical company, led by women, focussing on collaborative theatre with people who might not ordinarily encounter the arts. Later in the same year, they were joined by Susan Clarke, who as the artistic director led its activities until 2024, when she became executive director of Stoke Creates, the regional Cultural Compact.

Beavers was renamed B arts in the mid-1990s and the company has trained hundreds of artists, writers, musicians and community members in making participatory outdoor theatre, outdoor and street arts. The company became active in the cultural life in Stoke-on-Trent, early on being commissioned to create original street theatre for the Stoke-on-Trent Garden Festival, and also touring work to Italy, Romania, Bosnia, Hungary, Belgium, Denmark, France, Germany, Tunisia and New Zealand. It has brought work created in Mostar to North Staffordshire to create links between the region and Bosnia. In 2014, with funding from the Esmee Faribairn Foundation, B arts led a partnership initiative to bring back empty, postindustrial building back into use as art galleries, theatres and art studios as part of a project, called ArtCity.

The company runs Bread in Common, a community bakery run from its ex-warehouse hub. In recent years B arts has been involved in large-scale strategic cultural programmes delivered with partners, such as Art City, a five-year, half a million pound Sterling arts programme that aimed to make the city a more attractive place to live and work and the Appetite programme, an Arts Council England programme under its Creative People and Places initiative. During the pandemic, it opened a 'Pay what you want' café, using surplus food from supermarkets.

In September 2023, the BBC featured Susan Clarke and B arts as one of the finalists in the 'together category' on BBC Stoke.
