= Vietnam Journal =

Comic book series

- Cover of the first issue of Vietnam Journal, November 1987.

Publication information
- Publisher: Apple Comics
- Schedule: bimonthly; irregular
- Genre: , historical, war
- Publication date: November 1987 - April 1991
- No. of issues: 16
- Main character(s): Scott "Journal" Neithammer

Creative team
- Created by: Don Lomax
- Written by: Don Lomax
- Artist(s): Don Lomax

Collected editions
- Vietnam Journal - Book One: Indian Country: ISBN 978-1545270318
- Vietnam Journal - Book Two: The Iron Triangle: ISBN 978-0941613323
- Vietnam Journal - Book Three: From the Delta to Dak To: ISBN 978-1942351887

Vietnam Journal was a war comic book series written and drawn by Don Lomax and published by Apple Comics from November 1987 to April 1991.

After the cancellation of the original series, Apple Comics published a number of Vietnam Journal limited series and one-shots through 1994. Lomax continued the series in various forms, and in 2017, Caliber Comics revived the series with Vietnam Journal: Series Two, featuring all-new work by Lomax. Ultimately, enough material was created to furnish ten collections.

== Plot ==
The story follows Scott Neithammer, nicknamed "Journal" by the American soldiers, a freelance reporter in the Vietnam War obsessed with reporting from the point of view of the G.I., whatever the consequences.

== Background ==
Series creator Lomax was drafted in 1965 and served in Vietnam with the 98th Light Equipment Maintenance Company. During his tour of duty, he made notes and sketches which later were incorporated into Vietnam Journal.

== Reception ==
Vietnam Journal and its collected editions were positively reviewed by Military Book Club and Publishers Weekly, which wrote, "Lomax bases his fictional work on his real experiences in Vietnam in 1966... with powerful results. It is Lomax’s concern for average soldiers that, in the end, makes his work significant." The British comics website DownTheTubes.net praised the "hard-hitting" series for its "gritty storytelling that might appeal to fans of Charley's War and Battle Picture Weekly." Comic Book Resources wrote that, "Even today, Vietnam Journal is one of the most gritty and brutally honest war stories ever published."

Vietnam Journal collections published by iBooks, and edited by Hilary Hughes and Dwight Jon Zimmerman, were nominated for a 2004 Harvey Award for Best Domestic Reprint Project.

== Later series, collections, and reprints ==
After the demise of the original series, in 1992 Apple published a number of comics continuing the adventures of Scott "Journal" Neithammer:

- Vietnam Journal: Tet '68 (6 issues, 1992)
- Vietnam Journal: Bloodbath at Khe Sanh (4 issues, 1992–1993)
- Vietnam Journal: The Iron Triangle (one-shot, 1993)
- Vietnam Journal: Valley of Death (2 issues, June–August 1994)

Vietnam Journal was revived as a monthly full-page strip from 2002 to 2006 by Gallery magazine.

Vietnam Journal collections were re-issued by iBooks in 2004.

The entire Vietnam Journal series was re-published in graphic novel form through Transfuzion Publishing in 2011 (and later republished by Caliber Comics in 2017–2019).

Vietnam Journal: Series Two, featuring all-new material by Lomax, was published for 15 issues by Caliber Comics starting in 2017.

=== Collections ===
- Book One: Indian Country (Apple Press, 1990) ISBN 0-927203-02-2 — collects Vietnam Journal #1–4 plus an original story, "The 5.56 Blues"
  - *Book One: Indian Country (Transfuzion Publishing, 2009) ISBN 978-0-941613-81-1
- Book Two: The Iron Triangle (Apple Press, 1991) ISBN 0-927203-06-5 — collects Vietnam Journal #5–8 plus Vietnam Journal: The Iron Triangle
  - Book Two: the Iron Triangle (Transfuzion Publishing, 2010) ISBN 978-0-941613-32-3
- Vietnam Journal: Delta to Dak To (reprints 9–12) (Apple Press, 1991) ISBN 0-927203-07-3
- Book Three: From the Delta to Dak To (Transfuzion Publishing, 2010) ISBN 978-0-9826549-1-0 — collects Vietnam Journal #9–12 plus a story from The New Two-Fisted Tales #1 (Dark Horse Comics, 1993)
- Book Four: MIA (Transfuzion Publishing, 2010) ISBN 978-0-941613-76-7 — collects Vietnam Journal #13–16
- Book Five: Tet '68 (Transfuzion Publishing, 2010) ISBN 978-0-9826549-5-8 — collects Vietnam Journal: Tet '68 #1–6
- Book Six: Bloodbath at Khe Sanh (Transfuzion Publishing, 2011) ISBN 978-0-9826549-6-5 — collects the Apple Comics series High Shining Brass #1–4 (originally published in 1990, purporting to be "The True Story of an American Spy in Vietnam (by Robert Durand as told to Don Lomax)") and Vietnam Journal: Bloodbath at Khe Sanh #1–4
- Book Seven: Valley of Death (Transfuzion Publishing, 2011) ISBN 978-0-9826549-7-2 — collects Vietnam Journal: Valley of Death and material from Lomax's website and Gallery magazine
- Series Two, Book One: Incursion (Caliber Publishing, 2017) ISBN 978-1635299847 — collects Vietnam Journal: Series Two #1-5
- Series Two, Book Two: Journey into Hell (Caliber Publishing, 2018) ISBN 978-1635299267 — collects Vietnam Journal: Series Two #6-10
- Series Two, Book Three: Ripcord (Caliber Publishing, 2020) ISBN 978-1635298581 — collects Vietnam Journal: Series Two #11-15

== See also ==
- Rifas, Leonard (July 1990). "Don Lomax: An Interview With The Creator of Vietnam Journal". The Comics Journal. No. 136. pp. 86–103.
