= Michael Catron =

American comic book editor and publisher

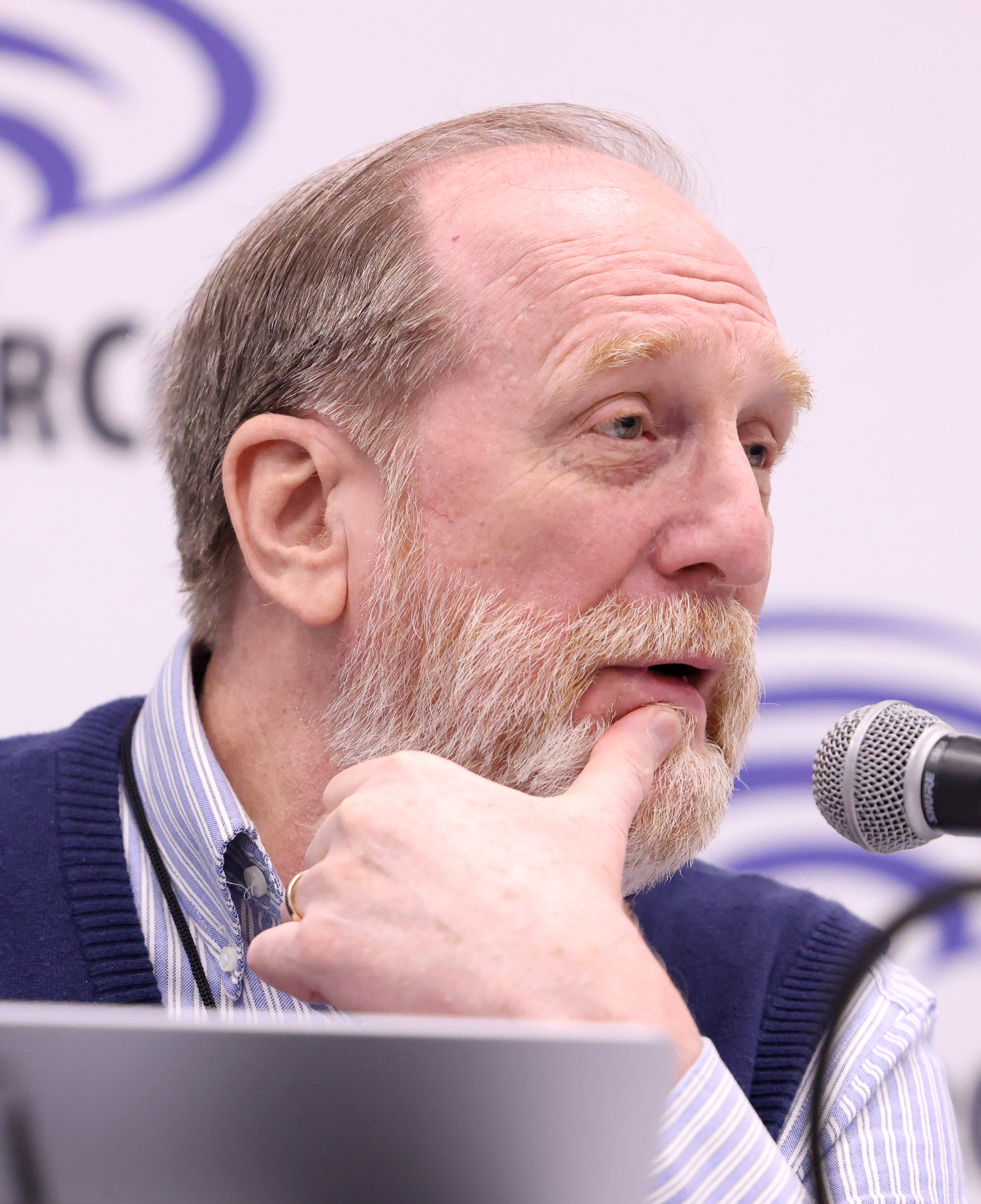
- Catron in 2026
- Born: J. Michael Catron; October 9, 1954 (age 72)
- Area: Publisher
- Notable works: Fantagraphics Books; Apple Comics
- Awards: Inkpot Award (2015)

Michael Catron (born October 9, 1954) is an American comic book editor and publisher. He is former publisher of Apple Comics and co-founder of Fantagraphics.

== Biography ==
Catron met Gary Groth while they were both enrolled at the University of Maryland. In 1974, Catron and Groth put on a Washington, DC-area rock and roll convention that ended in financial failure. Nonetheless, he and Groth dabbled in music publishing with the short-lived magazine Sounds Fine, which they co-published until 1979. During this period, Catron also worked as a public relations assistant for Mike Gold, who was employed by DC Comics at the time.

In 1976, Catron and Groth co-founded Fantagraphics Books; at the time of its foundation, the company was located in College Park, Maryland. They took over an adzine named The Nostalgia Journal, quickly renaming it The Comics Journal. Catron acted as Fantagraphics' co-publisher until 1985, also handling advertising and circulation for The Comics Journal from 1982 to 1985, when he left the company.

In 1986, Catron established Apple Comics, which began as a packager for Wendy and Richard Pini's WaRP Graphics but with its own financing structure.

From 2000 to 2008, Catron served as a board member for the Grand Comics Database.

Catron has been the agent for the estate of Superman co-creator Joe Shuster.

In early 2012, Catron relocated to Seattle and returned to Fantagraphics as editor with the publishing company he co-founded 36 years earlier.
