= Wendy Pini's Masque of the Red Death =

Wendy Pini's comic

Wendy Pini's Masque of the Red Death is a reimagining of the original 1842 short story by Edgar Allan Poe by the comic book creator Wendy Pini.

Based on the original short tale, Wendy Pini's Masque of the Red Death is set in an alternate, far distant future, where Anton 'Prince' Prosper uses his vast fortune and scientific genius to seek the ultimate power of life over death. When a young geneticist named Steffan Kabala enters Prosper's life and laboratory, the pair unlock a secret that may engulf the entire world in a maelstrom of death and destruction.

The story first appeared as a webcomic. Weekly episodes began in 2007. Each episode was created first in traditional comic book page format. Wendy Pini produced pages of full-color digital art then broke them down into individual panels. Using simple "inbetweens" and Adobe Flash she animated the panels in sequence, often creating additional art to enhance the illusion of movement. Dialog bubbles were layered into the art. Each roughly three-minute-long Flash movie was viewed using a Flash-based web browser viewer. The final episode in the adaptation was posted to the web in mid-2010.

== Plot ==
In an alternate Earth's far future, in the technologically advanced megacity of Sivarsi Nine, the One World Government Mainframe oversees all. Citizens live utopian, socially and sexually liberated lives, thanks to the Trankule Corporation's life-extending nanotechnology.

A wealthy man named Anton 'Prince' Prosper, a mysterious scientific genius, lusts for more. Secluded on his private island, he labors to perfect his invention: Attomons, a super nanotech able to bestow eternal life and youth. Aiding him are his lab assistant Steffan Kabala and Steffan's mother, geneticist Madame Kabala.

Eager to tap into Anton's vast fortune, Steffan's mother schemes to get the pair wedded and bedded, but Steffan's love for Anton, though volatile and possessive, is real. Shutting her out, the young scientists succeed in perfecting the Attomon formula. Even as their love soars, they vow to keep their discovery a secret for, in the wrong hands, it could lead to a bio-technical plague that could wipe out humanity.

At Steffan's lavish birthday party staged by vivacious social maven Bunchh, despite his good intentions, Anton succumbs to all the erotic temptations, immortality and unlimited wealth present. His flagrant dallying with both male and female guests leaves Steffan humiliated and heartbroken. He takes revenge by stealing the Attomon formula schematic microchip. Madame Kabala, in turn, steals the chip from Steffan, to sell to corrupt mega-mogul Tono Trankule.

The Trankule Corporation announces The Perma-Youth Project, its version of the stolen Attomon formula. Anton broadcasts a worldwide warning, but Madame Kabala assures the public that the Great Mainframe can manage the delicate Attomon program. Convinced the new technology is safe, wealthy buyers flock to gain eternal life.

As Anton warned, the Great Mainframe proves faulty; Trankule's clients begin to melt into puddles of red goo. Tono Trankule dissolves before his stricken daughter Fronda's eyes as she, too, shows symptoms of the Red Death. Madame Kabala, Steffan, Fronda and her young beau Daryel Mirrin seek refuge on Anton's island.

Touched by Daryel's plea for Fronda's life, Anton uses an untested, prototype siphon to remove her corrupt Attomons. She survives but, realizing her privileged world is crumbling, she confides to Daryel her regret at being sterilized. They and a deeply depressed Bunchh refuse when Anton, intent on starting a new world order ruled by an immortal elite, injects his thousand guests with pure Attomons.

As Steffan tries to regain his lover's trust, Madame Kabala fans his jealousy over Daryel's innocent friendship with Anton. The guests, believing themselves safe inside the mansion, revel in the pleasures of the seven rainbow chambers. Anton tells them anything goes except for his rigid house rule: "Nothing Against Another’s Will".

Crushed by the growing rift between Anton and Steffan, which prevents them from working together to check the plague, tender-hearted Bunchh commits suicide. Undone by grief, Steffan lets his mother goad him into injecting Daryel with Attomons. The hope is to expose the boy as a seducer after immortality and Anton's fortune, but the rash act backfires. Steffan has broken the house rule. Princely honor demands justice. Admitting he has always loved Steffan – and only Steffan – Anton cancels his Attomons, rendering him mortal.

Moments later, Madame Kabala – then all the screaming guests – begin to melt into pools of gore. Horrified, Anton realizes his father's atomic clock, timekeeper to his private, clean computer, has enabled the glitchy Great Mainframe to hack in and disrupt everyone's Attomon programming. Daryel and Anton, too, are dying. Knowing the siphon can cure only one at a time, Anton uses it on Daryel.

As the boy heals and Fronda watches, Anton is shocked to see Steffan approach with a smile of love and forgiveness. Near death, Anton gives Fronda and the now-cured Daryel the schematic for the siphon. He sends them out a secret passage to whatever awaits them. Cleansed of his own Attomons, Steffan has a chance to escape and live, but he chooses to embrace Anton and share his fate. Both men have finally learned the meaning of "a love that gives all, asking nothing in return".

== Characters ==
- Anton 'Prince' Prosper is a wealthy young man, heir to his family's immense fortune. He is also a scientific genius who seeks the secret of immortality, not just extended lifespan. He is based on Prince Prospero (the only named character) from the original short story by Edgar Allan Poe.
- Steffan Kabala is a brilliant young scientist who assists Anton in his quest. He and Anton earlier met as children, and now become lovers in the course of the story.
- Madame Kabala is Steffan's calculating mother, a famous geneticist in her own right. Sinister and ruthless, she will stop at nothing to advance her own fortunes.
- Bunchh is a blue-skinned androgynous party planner who hails from a distant land. She is a social maven given the responsibility for organizing Prosper's fateful Masque Ball.
- Daryel Mirrin, a young technician at the Trankule Corporation who falls in love with heiress Fronda Trankule, a socialite young woman far above his station.
- Tono Trankule, head of the Trankule Corporation, is Fronda's immensely wealthy and powerful father.

Other recurring characters include Bittie and Ix, two virtual reality gossip journalists; and Royess, Anton Prosper's companion black panther.

== In print ==
A graphic novel edition of Masque of the Red Death was imagined almost from the beginning of the adaptation process. The plan was to use the webcomic art assets as the basis of a print version. By the conclusion of the webcomic series, nearly 400 comic book formatted pages had been created. The first of three planned volumes, each of approximately 130 pages, was released in October 2008 by Go! Comi, a manga publisher. The print series was aborted when the publisher ceased operations in early 2010.

A revised print edition is under consideration for a second-half 2026 release.

== The musical ==
Once her reinterpretation of Poe's story was completed, Pini realized that her futuristic version of the story, done in the romantic boys' love (yaoi) style, would be perfect as a dramatic musical in the vein of Sweeney Todd or Phantom of the Opera.

Utilizing her theater background, her studies at SUNY New Paltz and The Actors Institute of NY, Wendy wrote the book and lyrics for her musical adaptation of Masque of the Red Death. Her mentors were Steve Cuden, who wrote the original book and lyrics for the cult hit musical Jekyll & Hyde, and actor/singer/director Calvin Remsberg, known worldwide for his performances in Sweeney Todd, Cats, and Phantom of the Opera.

Remsberg introduced Pini to the young star-in-the-making composer Gregory Nabours who performed a one-man show of his own compositions at the Kennedy Center for the Performing Arts in November 2014.

As of February 2025, there exists a full script, 30 completed songs, and a 2-hour animatic video of the entire two-act musical.

== Interviews and Reviews related to Masque ==
- Interview by Bridid Alverson on the Digital Strips website.
- Review by El Santo on the Webcomic Overlook website.
- Interview by Deb Aoki on the About.com website.
- Interview by Wolfen Moondaughter on the Sequential Tart website.
- Interview/podcast by "Jeannie" on the gfbrobot.com website.
- Interview/podcast by Sumiko Saulson on the Things that go bump in my head website.
- Interview by Bob Andelman on the Mr Media website.
