= Doug Murray (comics) =

American comic book writer (born 1947)

- Born: Douglas Murray; November 1947 (age 78–79) New York
- Areas: Writer, Publisher
- Notable works: The 'Nam
- Spouse: Pam Murray (m. 1979)

Douglas Murray (born November 1947) is an American comic book writer and novelist. He served as a non-commissioned officer in the Army in Vietnam during the Vietnam War. He worked as a writer for The Monster Times newspaper in the early 1970s, and later as a Marvel Comics writer from 1984 to 1991. He was the main writer on the popular 1980s comic book series The 'Nam, published by Marvel.

In the 1970s, Murray edited Heritage (a 2-issue fanzine dedicated to Flash Gordon), The Neal Adams Index (1974) and two separate ACBA Sketchbook publications (in 1973 and 1975 respectively).

Born and raised in New York, Doug grew up on Long Island in Lindenhurst, New York. He was always a mega-collector of science fiction books, pulps, monster magazines and all sorts of movie memorabilia. He moved to Florida in 1990 and resides there today with his wife Pam (married since November 1979).

== Bibliography ==
- The Monster Times various articles in numerous issues (early to mid-1970s)
- Heritage 1-A and 1-B (2-issue Flash Gordon fan publication) (1972) publisher/ editor
- ACBA Sketchbook (1973) publisher
- Neal Adams Index (1974) publisher
- ACBA Sketchbook 2 (1975) publisher
- Two The Destroyer paperback novels (connected plotwise) (circa 1975)
- Reel Fantasy Magazine # 1 (1978) - contributor
- Savage Tales Magazine Vol. 2, #1 and #4 (1984) each contained a "Nam" prototype story by Doug Murray
- The 'Nam #1-45, 49–51, 75 (Dec. 1986 - Dec. 1990)
- Mark Hazzard: Merc #5-12 (Mar. 1987 - Oct. 1987)
- Mark Hazzard: Merc Annual #1 (Jan. 1987)
- Justice Machine #14-26 (Comico, Feb. 1988–Feb. 1989)
- Hearts and Minds: A Vietnam Love Story, written by Murray/ illustrated by Russ Heath; Epic Comics (1990)
- The War #1-4 (June 1989 - Mar. 1990)
- Savage Sword of Conan #171, 182 (Mar. 1990 - Feb. 1991)
- What If? vol. 2 #10 (Feb. 1990)
- Sherlock Holmes and the Case of the Missing Martian (1990)
- Marvel Comics Presents #77-79 (1991)
- Nick Fury, Agent of S.H.I.E.L.D. vol. 3 #24 (June 1991)
- Medal of Honor Special (April 1994)
- Medal of Honor #1-4 (Oct. 2004 - Jan. 2005)
- Savage Red Sonja: Queen of the Frozen Wastes #1 - 4 (Aug. 2006 - Oct. 2006)
- Jungle Girl (First Dynamite series) #3 (Nov. 2007)
- Jungle Girl Season 2 #1 - 5 (Nov. 2008 - July 2009)
- Jungle Girl Season 3 #1 - 4 (2009)
- Athena #1 - 4 (Sept. 2009 - Mar. 2010)
- The 'Nam: 1966-1969 Omnibus Hardcover (2025) reprints #1 through 45 of "The 'Nam" comic book series
