= Bojan the Bear =

- Medved Bojan
- Genre: Children's
- Created by: B. Ranitović (script); D. Povh (script); P. Štalter (animation); Z. Gašparović (animation)
- Directed by: Branko Ranitović; Dušan Povh
- Composers: Mojmir Sepe; Lado Jakša
- Country of origin: Slovenia

Production
- Running time: 4-5 min
- Production companies: Studio 37 - Ljubljana; Viba Film - Ljubljana

Original release
- Network: TV Ljubljana 1 (1985-91) and TV Slovenia 1 (1991-99) (Slovenia); The Children's Channel (1988-94) (U.K.)
- Release: 1985 – 1999

Bojan the Bear (Slovene: Medved Bojan) is the title and the protagonist of the Slovenian animation children's television series. It's the best-known and most successful Slovenian cartoon series.

Bojan the Bear is a painter who paints his own world using three colours. A friend enters his world, using two additional colours - white and black - to paint glaciers.

The cartoon was created by Serbian-born Branko Ranitović and Slovenian Dušan Povh. Series was in original run from 1985 to 1999. Animated series was broadcast on Slovenian national television RTV Ljubljana and broadcast on United Kingdom television The Children's Channel. Character was originally animated by Zdenko Gašparović and Pavao Štalter.

== List of episodes ==
=== Season 1 (1985) ===
| No. | Title | Directed by | Written by | Original release date |
|---|---|---|---|---|
| 1 | "Bojan The Bear - Mountaineer" | Branko Ranitović | Branko Ranitović | October 24, 1985 |
| 2 | "Bojan The Bear - Photographer" | Branko Ranitović | Dušan Povh | October 24, 1985 |
| 3 | "Bojan The Bear - Racing Car Driver" | Branko Ranitović | Branko Ranitović | October 24, 1985 |
| 4 | "Bojan The Bear - Gymnast" | Branko Ranitović | Branko Ranitović | October 24, 1985 |
| 5 | "Bojan The Bear - In The Circus" | Branko Ranitović | Dušan Povh | October 24, 1985 |

=== Season 2 (1988_ ===
| No. | Title | Directed by | Written by | Original release date |
|---|---|---|---|---|
| 6 | "Bojan The Bear - Athlete" | Branko Ranitović | – | February 26, 1988 |
| 7 | "Bojan The Bear - Sailor" | Branko Ranitović | – | February 26, 1988 |
| 8 | "Bojan The Bear - Chauffeur" | Branko Ranitović | – | February 26, 1988 |
| 9 | "Bojan The Bear - Television" | Branko Ranitović | – | February 26, 1988 |
| 10 | "Bojan The Bear - Breakfast" | Branko Ranitović | – | February 26, 1988 |
| 11 | "Bojan The Bear - Winter Sports" | Branko Ranitović | – | February 26, 1988 |

=== Season 3 (1995_ ===
| No. | Title | Directed by | Written by | Original release date |
|---|---|---|---|---|
| 12 | "Bojan The Bear - Musician" | D. Povh, B. Ranitović | Dušan Povh | 1995 |

=== Season 4 (1996) ===
| No. | Title | Directed by | Written by | Original release date |
|---|---|---|---|---|
| 13 | "Bojan The Bear - The Scarecrow" | D. Povh, B. Ranitović | Vera Suhadolnik | 1995 |
| 14 | "Bojan The Bear - Camping" | D. Povh, B. Ranitović | Karmen Lužar | 1995 |

=== Season 5 (1998) ===
| No. | Title | Directed by | Written by | Original release date |
|---|---|---|---|---|
| 15 | "Bojan The Bear - Easter" | Branko Ranitović | Dušan Povh | 1998 |

=== Season 6: 1999 ===
| No. | Title | Directed by | Written by | Original release date |
|---|---|---|---|---|
| 16 | "Bojan the Bear - Robinson" | Dušan Povh | Dušan Povh | 1999 |

== Broadcast UK history ==
- The Children's Channel (1988–1994)

== VHS UK history ==
- Screen Legends (1988–1993)

=== Videos ===
In 1988, "Bojan The Bear - Athlete" was released on a The Children's Channel which was exclusively sold and distributed under license from Carlton Communications along with Bojan the Bear and many more.

| Title | Release date | VHS Studio | Episodes |
|---|---|---|---|
| All Colours, Shapes and Sizes | 1988 | Screen Legends | Bojan The Bear - Athlete |
