= Pavao Štalter =

Croatian illustrator (1929–2021)

Pavao Štalter (Karanac, 25 November 1929 – Zagreb, 5 October 2021) was a Croatian animator, director, screenwriter, scenographer and artist. He is known for his many animation shorts he produced at Zagreb Film.

== Filmography ==
- "Stvari" (1965, main artist)
- "Veliki i mali manevri" (1966, main artist)
- "Kutije" (1967, screenwriter, director, main artist)
- "Maska crvene smrti" (1969, co-director, main artist, main animator)
- "Scabies" (1970, co-director, main artist, co-animator)
- "Duša" ( 1970, screenwriter, director, main artist)
- "Mačka" ( 1971, main animator)
- "Kubus" (1972, screenwriter, director, main animator)
- "Konj" (1972, screenwriter, director, main animator)
- "Love Story" (1973, main animator and co-director with Zlatko Bourek)
- "Dolazak Slavena" (1975, main artist, main animator)
- "Kulturna baština Hrvata - arhitektura" (1975, main artist, main animator)
- "Kulturna baština Hrvata - kiparstvo" (1975, main artist, main animator)
- "Feudalno društvo I." (1976, main artist, main animator)
- "Feudalno društvo II." (1976, main artist, main animator)
- "Sedam plamenčića" (1976, screenwriter, director, main artist, main animator)
- "Medvjedić Bojan" (1975-1983, Children's cartoon, 15 episodes; main artist)
- "Baltazar spotovi" (1973, screenwriter, director, main artist)
- "Miš na Marsu" (1976-1979, Children's cartoon, 20 episodes; main artist)
- "Baltazarov sat" (1979, screenwriter, main artist, director)
- "Izgubljeni zec" (1979, screenwriter, main artist, director)
- "Ptica" (1979, screenwriter, main artist, director)

Štalter worked as a scenographer for many other works, such as Inspektor Maska.
