= Thunderbunny =

Publication information
- Publisher: Charlton Comics, Red Circle Comics, WaRP Graphics, Apple Comics
- First appearance: Comic Crusader Storybook #1 (1977)
- Created by: Martin L. Greim

In-story information
- Alter ego: Bobby Caswell
- Abilities: Super-strength, flight

Thunderbunny is a comic book character who transforms from a boy into a superhero resembling a large pink humanoid rabbit. The character was created by Martin L. Greim.

== Publication history ==
Thunderbunny's first appearance published by a major company was Charlton Bullseye #6 (Mar. 1982), published by Charlton Comics. Thunderbunny made a subsequent appearance in that title's tenth issue.

The character then moved briefly to Archie Comics, appearing in Thunderbunny #1 as part of Red Circle Comics, a short-lived revival of the Archie Comics superhero characters. Thunderbunny appeared in Blue Ribbon Comics #13 (Oct.1984), co-starring in a story also featuring the Fly, the Shield, the Web and the Jaguar, as well as appearances in The Mighty Crusaders #7 and Pep Comics #393 (March 1984).

Thunderbunny then moved to WaRP Graphics for a six-issue run (June 1985 – Feb. 1986), with an additional story in Warp Graphics Annual #1. Issues #7–12 were published by Apple Comics (Apr. 1986 – Nov. 1987).

Thunderbunny creator Martin L. Greim died of heart failure on April 15, 2017, at the age of 74.

== Character history ==
Thunderbunny was the last survivor of an alien race of humanoid animals. The essence of this world's greatest hero was transferred into a special box-shaped device and subtly presented to a young boy named Bobby Caswell.

When Bobby placed his hands in two hand-shaped impressions on the box, power transferred into his body and gave him the ability to transform into Thunderbunny. His powers include super-strength and flight.

Bobby finds the bunny form to be embarrassing. Furthermore, the longer he stays in that form, the more difficult it is to form the essential mental image of his original form to change back. This combination of concerns makes him most reluctant to use his superhero identity, but he has still had adventures as Thunderbunny.

== See also ==
- Hoppy the Marvel Bunny
- Captain Carrot
- Tonde Burin - Similar story of a human transforming into an anthropomorphic superhero
