= WaRP Graphics =

American alternative comics publishing company

- Industry: Comics
- Founded: 1977
- Founder: Wendy and Richard Pini
- Headquarters: Poughkeepsie, New York
- Key people: Wendy and Richard Pini
- Divisions: Apple Comics; Father Tree Press
- Website: www.elfquest.com

WaRP Graphics, later Warp Graphics, is an alternative comics publisher best known for creating and being the original publisher of the Elfquest comic book series. It was created and incorporated in 1977 by Wendy and Richard Pini. The company title is an acronym formed from the founding couple's name: Wendy and Richard Pini (in later years the capitalization was changed from WaRP to Warp, a mostly aesthetic move).

In addition to Elfquest, Warp also published several other comic book series, including MythAdventures and related titles by Robert Asprin, and Thunder Bunny, created by Martin Greim.

Warp was also the original publisher of A Distant Soil by Colleen Doran, until Doran left under acrimonious circumstances, alleging that WaRP attempted to claim copyright on her work, which WaRP denied. Warp sued licensee publisher Starblaze Graphics for, among other issues, publication of unauthorized Elfquest reprints, inaccurate reporting of royalties, but primarily for tortious interference in Warp's contract with Doran (who was also named in the Donning lawsuit), by attempting to assume the rights to A Distant Soil. Starblaze countersued; the dispute was settled out of court by Donning and Doran in 1988. All rights previously licensed to Donning in Elfquest reverted to Warp; Warp reverted all rights in A Distant Soil to Doran.

== History ==
=== Apple Comics ===
From 1978 through 1984, Warp Graphics published the 20-issue original Elfquest series. When Elfquest subsequently went on hiatus to allow artist Wendy Pini to recuperate from hip replacement surgery, publisher Richard Pini began to contract the work of other writers and artists, to establish a line of generally fantasy-oriented comics titles. In 1986, Pini turned Warp's publishing and marketing duties over to Michael Catron's Apple Comics so that Warp could concentrate on editing its comics titles. Titles packaged by Warp for Apple included the anthology series FantaSci, Vietnam Journal, and Lee Marrs's Unicorn Isle (which ran to #5 of a projected 12 issues).

In 1987, Apple Comics took over editing duties on all the other titles, and Warp concentrated solely on producing new Elfquest series. In 1990 Warp and Apple parted ways. In 1992 Warp launched the first of several new Elfquest spin-off series (Hidden Years). Shortly thereafter, Warp for the first time invited other writers and artists to join in the creation of new Elfquest material. Beginning in 1997, WaRP also published a few Elflord comics by Barry Blair and Colin Chan, who had also written for Elfquest. From 1992 to 2002 Warp Graphics worked with a number of free-lance artists and writers to produce and publish several Elfquest related titles. In 2002, the company downsized to its original owners, Wendy and Richard Pini in order to concentrate solely on producing canonical Elfquest material.

=== Father Tree Press imprint ===
Warp also launched a book publishing imprint, Father Tree Press (named after the Wolfriders' original tree-home in Elfquest), primarily reprinting Elfquest stories. The imprint also appeared on Chroma, a book on the artwork of Alex Schomburg, and Law and Chaos, a chronicle of Wendy Pini's early attempt to adapt Michael Moorcock's Stormbringer saga into an animated film. Warp and Father Tree Press still exist; while they are not currently publishing new Elfquest books in printed comic or book format, they continue to publish both existing and new Elfquest material digitally online. They also published, from 2007 to 2010, both in print and digitally, Wendy Pini's non-Elfquest graphic novel Masque of the Red Death, a futuristic reimagining of the Edgar Allan Poe short story.

=== Partnership with DC ===
In 2003 the Pinis licensed the worldwide publication and media rights in Elfquest to DC Comics. DC put out two series of "manga-style" digest reprints (now complete), the first four volumes of an archive reprint series, one new graphic novel, and a four-part comic series entitled Discovery, which has since been collected. DC and Warp parted ways in 2007, when Warp opted not to renew the DC contract.

=== Partnership with Warner Bros. ===
In 2008, Warp Graphics licensed the media rights in Elfquest to Warner Bros. with the aim of turning the comic book series into a motion picture. A director and screenwriter, Rawson Thurber, were attached to the project and several versions of a script, as well as some production artwork, were completed. The option expired in 2009.

=== Partnership with Dark Horse Comics ===
In 2012, Warp licensed worldwide publication rights in Elfquest to Dark Horse Comics making the title the only independent comic to have been published by all of the "Big Three" comics companies in the US. To date, Dark Horse has published the complete Final Quest story arc, as well as several volumes in the Complete Elfquest collection. More volumes are planned at least into 2020.

== Titles ==
Titles published include:

- Blood of the Innocent (four issues, 1986)
- A Distant Soil (nine issues, 1983–1986)
- Elflord (four issues, 1997)
- Elfquest (1978–present; many miniseries and specials)
- FantaSci (nine issues, 1986–1990)
- MythAdventures (12 issues, 1984–1986)
- MythConceptions (eight issues, 1986–1988)
- Return to Centaur (or: What Kind of Foal Am I?) (1990)
- Thunderbunny (12 issues, 1985–1987)
- Unicorn Isle (five issues, 1986)
