= Wendy and Richard Pini =

Creators of the Elfquest series

Wendy Pini
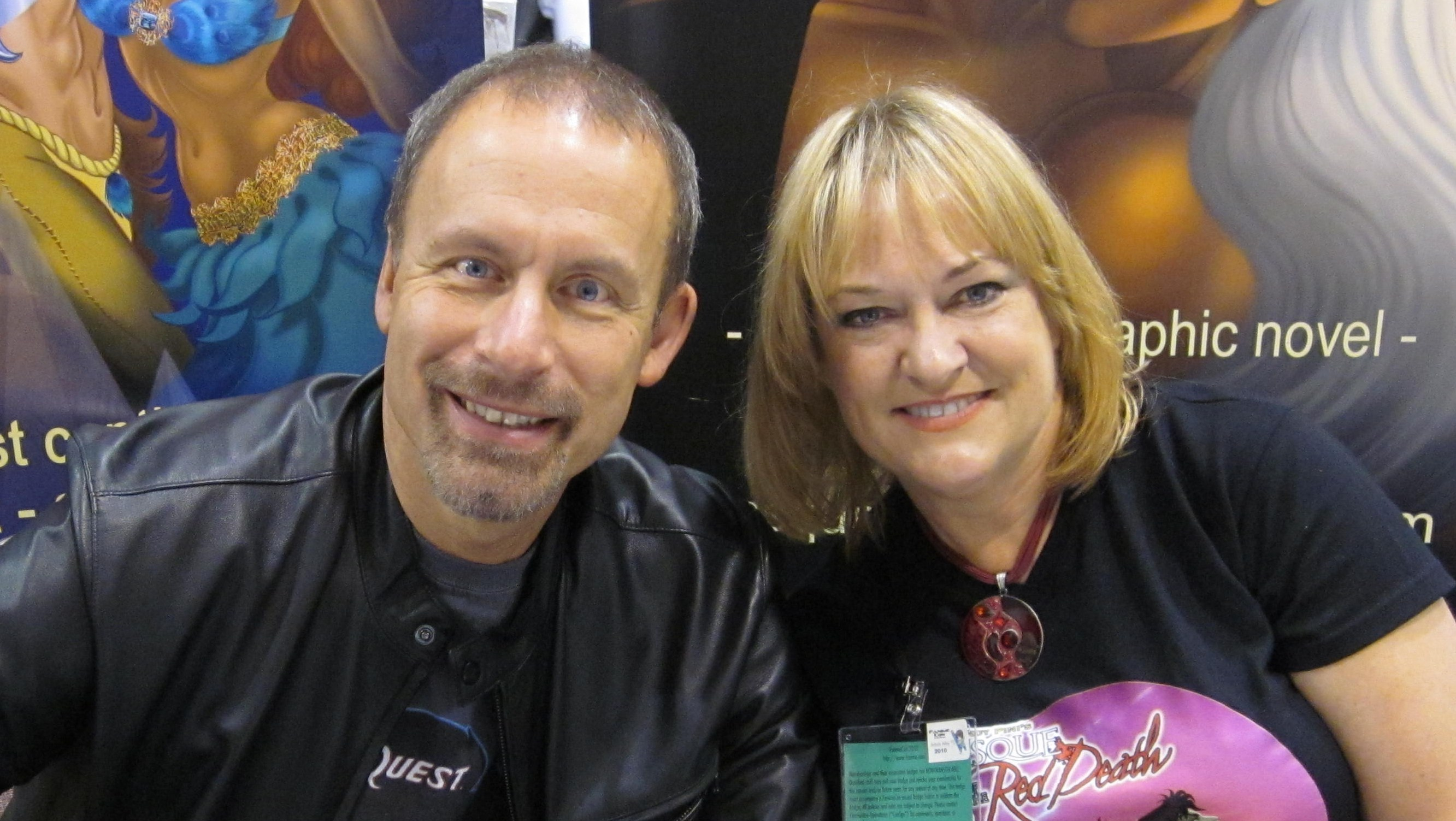
- Richard and Wendy Pini at FanimeCon 2010 in San Jose, California
- Born: Wendy Fletcher; June 4, 1951 (age 75) San Francisco, California, United States
- Areas: Writer; penciler; inker
- Notable works: Elfquest, Wendy Pini's Masque of the Red Death

Richard Pini
- Born: July 19, 1950 (age 76) New Haven, Connecticut, United States
- Areas: Writer; editor; publisher
- Notable works: Elfquest

Wendy Pini (Note: /ˈpiːni/) (née Fletcher; born June 4, 1951) and Richard Pini (born July 19, 1950) are the husband-and-wife team responsible for creating the well-known Elfquest series of comics, graphic novels and prose works. They are also known as WaRP (as in Warp Graphics).

== Early life ==
Wendy Fletcher was born in San Francisco in 1951, and from an early age demonstrated the talents later to come to fruition as a professional illustrator, and eventually as the creator of Elfquest.

Wendy's youthful interest in fantasy was inspired in part by Shakespeare and Kipling. She took artistic inspiration from Victorian illustrators such as Arthur Rackham and Edmund Dulac, designers such as Walt Disney, Doug Wildey, and Erté, as well as comic book greats such as Jack Kirby and Japanese manga artist Osamu Tezuka.

Richard Pini was born in 1950, in New Haven, Connecticut. After an exemplary academic performance at school, he was accepted into the Massachusetts Institute of Technology (MIT) for an astrophysics degree. Always a fan of science fiction, at college he found a new diversion in comic books.

Wendy Fletcher and Richard Pini met when Pini read a letter of Fletcher's that had been published in issue #5 of the Silver Surfer comic book. A correspondence began, spanning a period of four years. The two eventually married in 1972, and Wendy embarked upon a career as an illustrator for sci-fi magazines. A degree in astronomy from MIT led Richard to a position at Boston's Charles Hayden Planetarium as lecturer, photographer, script writer and special effects technician. Later, he taught high school astronomy, then worked for IBM until Elfquest became a full-time occupation.

== Career ==
Fletcher contributed several covers and illustrations to Galaxy Science Fiction and Galileo magazines in the mid-1970s. Prior to the widespread publication of Elfquest, Wendy was also known for dressing up at comic book conventions as Red Sonja.

=== Elfquest ===
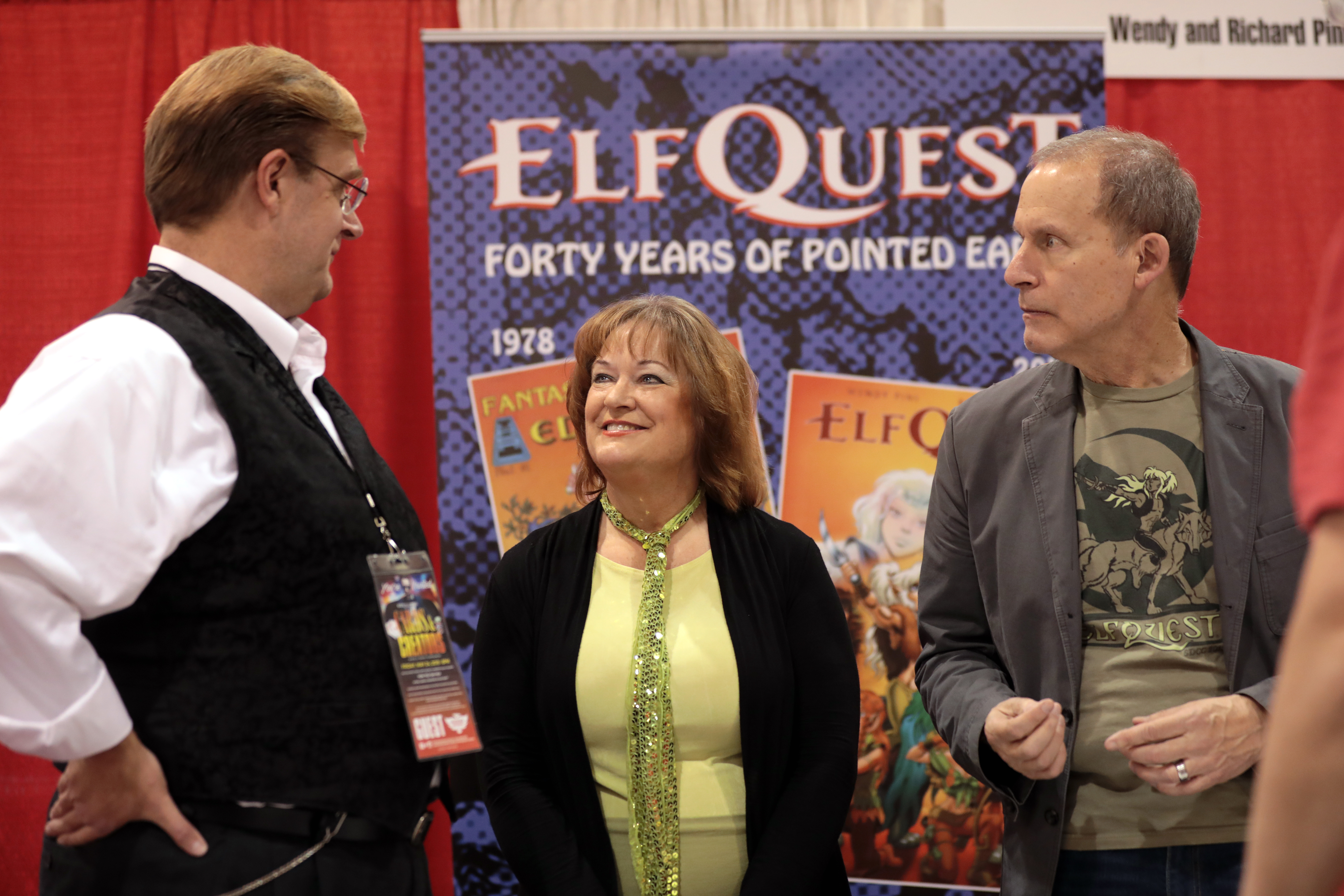
James A. Owen (left) speaking with Wendy and Richard Pini (center, right) at the 2019 Phoenix Fan Fusion

Elfquest, a fantasy story about a community of elves, was launched in 1978 with art and co-writing by Wendy Pini. Richard Pini, who had been working for IBM, is credited as co-writer and editor on Elfquest, as well as handling all of the publishing and business aspects of Warp Graphics.

=== Stormbringer ===
Wendy Pini wrote a book documenting her attempt to make an animated film project of the Stormbringer stories. Law and Chaos: The "Stormbringer" Animated Film Project was published by Father Tree Press (an imprint of the Pinis' WaRP Graphics) in 1987. The book contains original artwork, information on the characters, an overview of the plot, and Wendy Pini's personal investment in the project. The film never reached completion, but the full content of Law and Chaos may be found on the Masque of the Red Death website.

=== Masque of the Red Death ===
In 2007, Wendy Pini turned her attention to a new project unrelated to Elfquest. Taking the Edgar Allan Poe short story "Masque of the Red Death" as a starting point, she adapted the tale into both graphic novel and web comic formats, giving it a futuristic, dystopic slant.

=== Other work ===
In addition to Elfquest, Wendy Pini also created two graphic novels based on the TV series Beauty and the Beast and has illustrated occasional stories for both Marvel Comics and DC Comics. She wrote an introduction to the first volume of the Gargoyles trade paperback and mentions being a fan of the show.

== Awards and honors ==
- 1979 Ed Aprill Award (New York Comic Art Convention) – Best Independent Comic (Elfquest)
- 1979, 1980 Alley Award (Elfquest)
- 1980 Small Press Writers and Artists Organization – Best Artist (Comics), Wendy Pini – Best Editor (Comics), Richard & Wendy Pini
- 1980 San Diego Comic Convention – Inkpot Award (Wendy Pini, Richard Pini)
- 1981 Phantasy Press Comic Art Awards (Woody Awards, in honor of Wally Wood) – Best Alternative Comic (Elfquest)
- 1983 Small Press Writers and Artists Organization – Best Comic (Elfquest)
- 1983 Heroes Award (Heroes Aren't Hard To Find) – Best Black and White Magazine (Elfquest)
- 1984 New York State Jaycees Distinguished Service Award (Wendy & Richard Pini)
- 1985 Balrog Award (Sword and Shield Corp. of Denver, Colorado) – Best Artist (Wendy Pini)
- 1986 Fantasy Festival Comic Book Awards (El Paso Fantasy Festival) – Best Alternative Comic (Elfquest)
- 1987, 1988 Skywise (Elfquest character) inducted into Massachusetts Institute of Technology freshman class
- 1989 Golden Pen Award (Young Adult Advisory Committee, Spokane, Washington) (Elfquest)
- 2002 Friends of Lulu Women Cartoonists Hall of Fame (Wendy Pini)
- 2019 Inducted into the Eisner Awards Hall of Fame (Comic-Con International)
- 2021 Inkwell Awards Stacey Aragon Special Recognition Award (SASRA) (Wendy Pini)

== Appearances in other media ==
Characters based on Richard and Wendy Pini appear in Ghost Rider volume 1, #14 (Oct. 1975), as well as issues #15, #17, #18, and #19, which were written by Tony Isabella. Richard is a special effects technician and props arranger for a Hollywood movie studio, and Wendy is a costume designer.

Elfquest and Wendy Pini are both referenced in Marvel's Uncanny X-Men #153 (January 1982), "Kitty's Fairy Tale", written by Chris Claremont. In that issue, Kitty Pryde wears an Elfquest T-shirt throughout, while a sprite named "Pini" makes an appearance with "Bamf" on p. 16.

In Fantastic Four #242 (May 1982), series writer/artist John Byrne portrays an Elfquest play staged at a theatre built over the site of the flophouse where the Human Torch found the amnesiac Namor in Fantastic Four #4.

Richard Pini is caricatured as a mad scientist in Charlton Bullseye #10 (December 1982) in a Thunderbunny story written by Martin Greim.

In Robert Lynn Asprin's MythAdventures series, Wendy and Richard appear in the dimension of Limbo as Drahcir and Idnew: the Woof Writers, a husband and wife team of werewolves.
