= Eagle (Richard Eagle) =

- Cover art of Eagle #13 (January 1988)

Publication information
- Publisher: Crystal Comics; Apple Comics; American Mythology Productions
- Schedule: Monthly
- Format: Ongoing series
- Publication date: (Vol. 1): 1986–1989 (Vol. 2): 2016
- No. of issues: (Vol. 1): 23 (#1–16, Crystal; #17–23, Apple) (Vol. 2): 1

Creative team
- Created by: Neil Vokes and Rich Rankin
- Written by: Jack Herman; also Neil Vokes, Rich Rankin
- Artist(s): Neil Vokes and Rich Rankin

Eagle is a black-and-white indie comic book series which originated in 1986 by artists Neil Vokes and Rich Rankin. Most issues were written by Jack Herman, although some were written by Herman, Vokes and Rankin. It was originally published by its creators as Crystal Comics (Crystal Publications), then by Apple Comics. Initially the Eagle series ran for 23 issues, ending in 1989; the last 7 issues were published by Apple Comics. The series achieved a cult following. It was revived in 2016 by publisher American Mythology Productions and again features art by Vokes and writing by Herman.

== Summary ==
Eagle chronicled the adventures of detective and vigilante Richard Eagle, a mystic and martial arts adept who wields a sword. Eagle resides in Crystal City on a futuristic Earth, inhabited by humans and non-humans (presumably extraterrestrials).
