= American Eagle (comics) =

American Eagle, in comics, may refer to:

- American Eagle (DC Comics), a cartoon animal superhero and member of the Zoo Crew, published by DC Comics
- American Eagle (Marvel Comics), a Native American superhero appearing in Marvel Comics publications
- American Eagle (Standard Comics), a superhero published by Standard Comics during the Golden Age of Comics
- Blue Eagle (character), a superhero appearing in Marvel Comics, originally known as American Eagle

== See also ==
- American Eagle (disambiguation)
