= Hilary Hughes =

British performer and director (1949-2021)

- Born: 1949
- Died: 2021 (aged 71–72)
- Known for: Participatory Arts, Street Theatre, Outdoor Arts

Hilary Hughes (1949–2021) was an outdoor and participatory arts performer, theatre director and lantern maker based in Stoke-on-Trent, where she founded the long-running cultural organisation B arts. Her work involved many performances across the city and beyond, from large-scale outdoor arts events, lantern festivals, giant puppets to small-scale intimate projects involving only few people. Her work has had a big influence on the development of socially engaged arts in the region, as well as across Europe. Her work received support and funding from Arts Council England, the Baring Foundation and the Paul Hamlyn Foundation, amongst others.

== Biography ==
Hilary Hughes was born in Bromborough, Cheshire to John Hughes, a World War 2 Spitfire pilot, and mother Audrey. Early in her career, she became lighting designer and stage manager for Peter Sykes' Edinburgh fringe shows and joined his Ritual and Tribal Theatre. In 1985 she was part of a trio of women who formed Beavers, now known as B arts, a participatory arts organisation based in Stoke-on-Tent, establishing itself as the UK first female-led outdoor arts company. Regional performances followed over her 40-year career, including street theatre works as part of the Stoke-on-Trent Garden Festival in 1985, The Weird Sisters of Charshe (1985), performances at Glastonbury and the Hat Fair, and many other participatory, outdoor arts performances. International performances included events in Mostar, Bosnia (1995), continuing her work with refugees and migrant communities.

She was a member of Welfare State International, Theatre of Fire and Emergency Exit Arts, working as a lantern maker, production and project manager. She received an honorary doctor of Staffordshire University in 2013. In 2021, Hilary Hughes died in Royal Stoke University Hospital after a short battle with COVID-19.
