= American Eagle A-129 =

American 1920s light aircraft

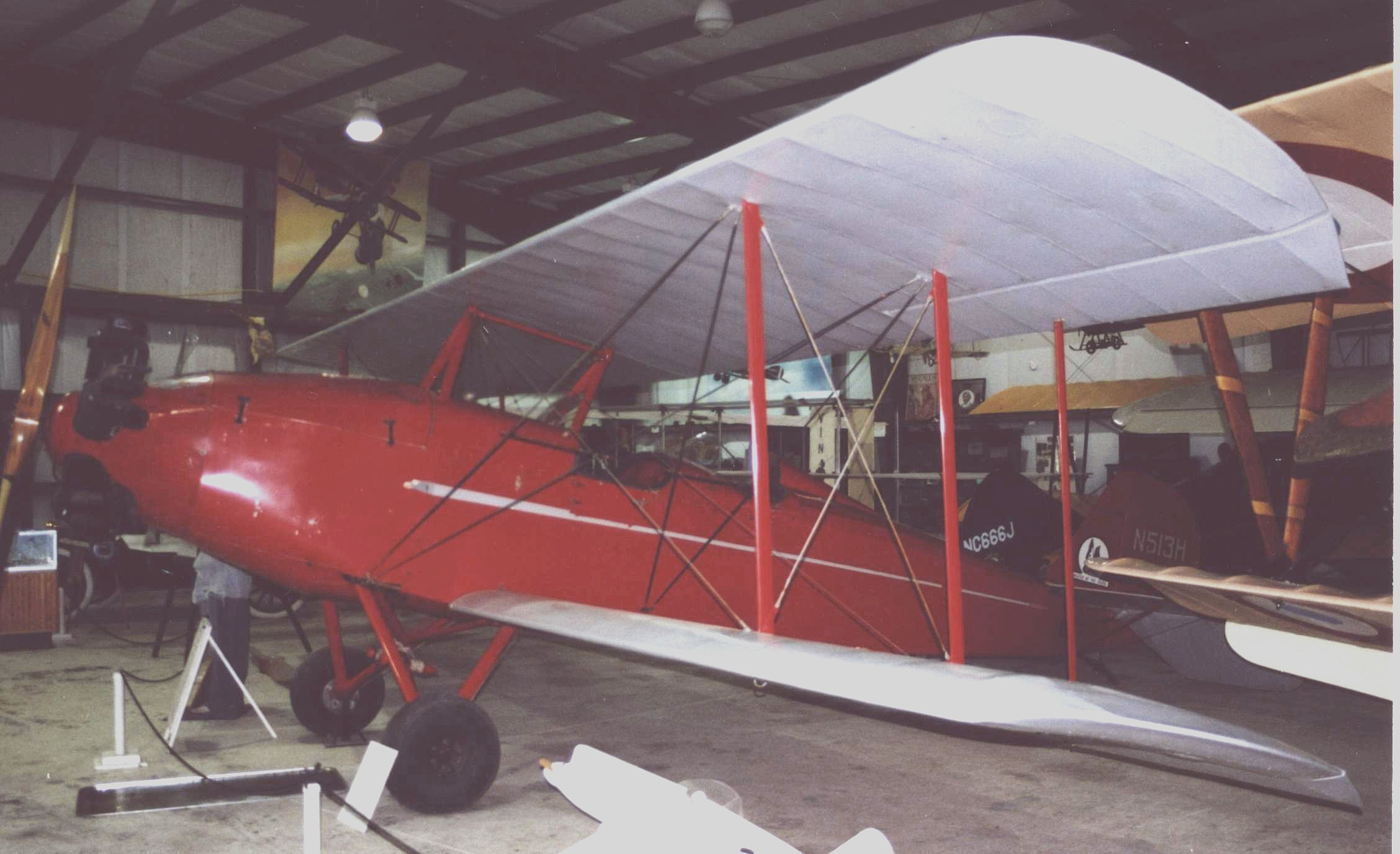
- American Eagle A-129 with Kinner K-5 engine at Old Rhinebeck, NY, in June 2005

General information
- Type: three seat open cockpit biplane
- National origin: United States
- Manufacturer: American Eagle Aircraft Corporation
- Designer: Giuseppe Bellanca
- Status: several still airworthy and displayed in museums
- Primary user: training, barnstorming and private owners
- Number built: more than 400

History
- First flight: 1929
- Developed from: American Eagle A-101

The American Eagle A-129 was an American biplane first flown in 1929.

== Design and development ==
The preceding American Eagle A-101 of 1926 had achieved some success, but its fierce spin characteristics had resulted in several crashes during training flights. Giuseppe Bellanca redesigned the biplane with a longer fuselage and narrower cowling to accommodate the five-cylinder Kinner K-5 100 h.p. radial engine, which had its cylinder heads exposed. To mark the year of its first appearance, the designation A-129 was applied.

== Operational history ==
Initially designed to replace the Porterfield Flying Schools A-101s, the new biplane proved to have good flying characteristics and more than 400 were built. The aircraft were also flown by "barnstormers" and sports pilots.

Several A-129s remain airworthy and examples are preserved at the Rhinebeck Aerodrome Museum at Old Rhinebeck in New York state and in the Kansas Aviation Museum Wichita, Kansas.

== Variants ==
A range of engines was fitted to the A-129 without changing the type designation. They included the 90 hp (67 kW) Curtiss OX-5 straight engine and others up to the 200 h.p. Wright J-4.

The American Eagle A-229 was a two seat trainer version with a Curtiss OX-5 engine.

== Specifications (100 h.p. Kinner K-5) ==
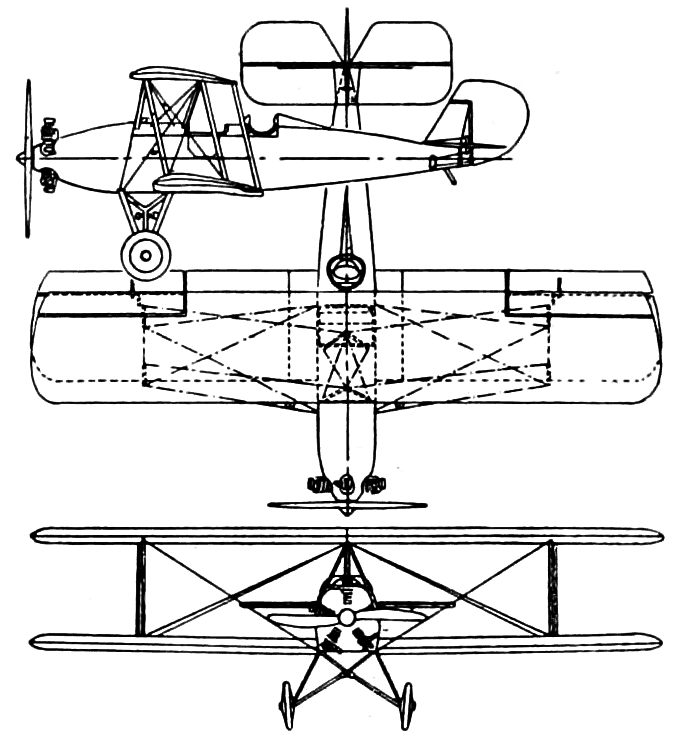
American Eagle A-129 3-view drawing from Aero Digest June 1929

Data from Aero Digest June 1929

General characteristics

- Crew: one
- Capacity: two passengers
- Length: 25 ft 1 in (7.65 m)
- Wingspan: 30 ft 0 in (9.14 m)
- Height: 8 ft 4 in (2.54 m)
- Wing area: 160 sq ft (15 m^{2}) upper, lower 140 sq ft (13 m^{2}) lower
- Empty weight: 1,220 lb (553 kg)
- Gross weight: 2,041 lb (926 kg)
- Fuel capacity: 42 US gal (35 imp gal; 160 L)
- Powerplant: 1 × Kinner K-5 five cylinder radial, 100 hp (75 kW)
- Propellers: 2-bladed wooden, fixed pitch

Performance

- Maximum speed: 105 mph (169 km/h, 91 kn)
- Cruise speed: 95 mph (153 km/h, 83 kn) /bk>
- Take-off run: 100–150 ft (30–46 m)
- Landing speed: 30 mph (48 km/h; 26 kn)
- Stall speed: 35 mph (56 km/h, 30 kn)
- Range: 500 mi (800 km, 430 nmi)
- Service ceiling: 14,000 ft (4,300 m)
- Rate of climb: 900 ft/min (4.6 m/s) initial
