= Police and Security News =

American magazine

Police and Security News also known as P&SN is a bimonthly American magazine which covers news, information, products and services which affect policing and law enforcement. The magazine was founded in 1984. It is based in Quakertown, PA.

Topics covered include new technology and information, training and tactics, new equipment and weaponry, innovative management ideas, police science and investigation, advancements in computer hardware and software, and less-lethal technology.

In 2014 the magazine claimed a circulation of 24,000 copies. Its slogan is "Serving Law Enforcement & Homeland Security".
