= American Eagle Aircraft Corporation =

American aircraft manufacturer

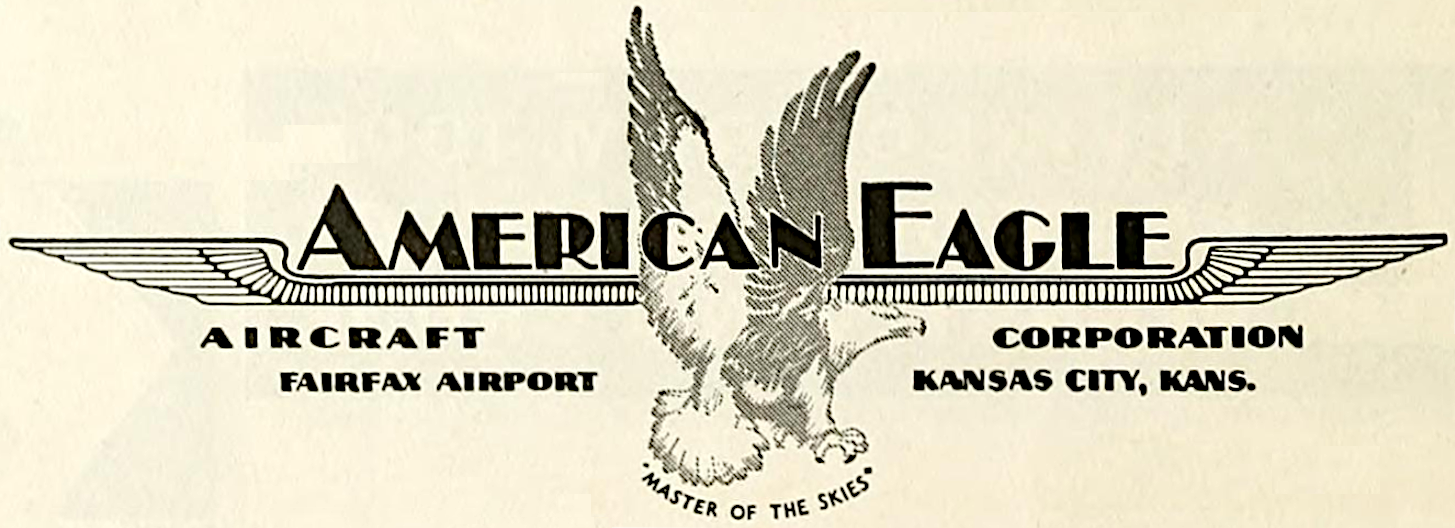
- Industry: Aerospace
- Founded: 1925
- Founder: Edward E. Porterfield
- Defunct: 1931
- Successor: American Eagle-Lincoln Aircraft Corporation
- Headquarters: Kansas City, Missouri, United States

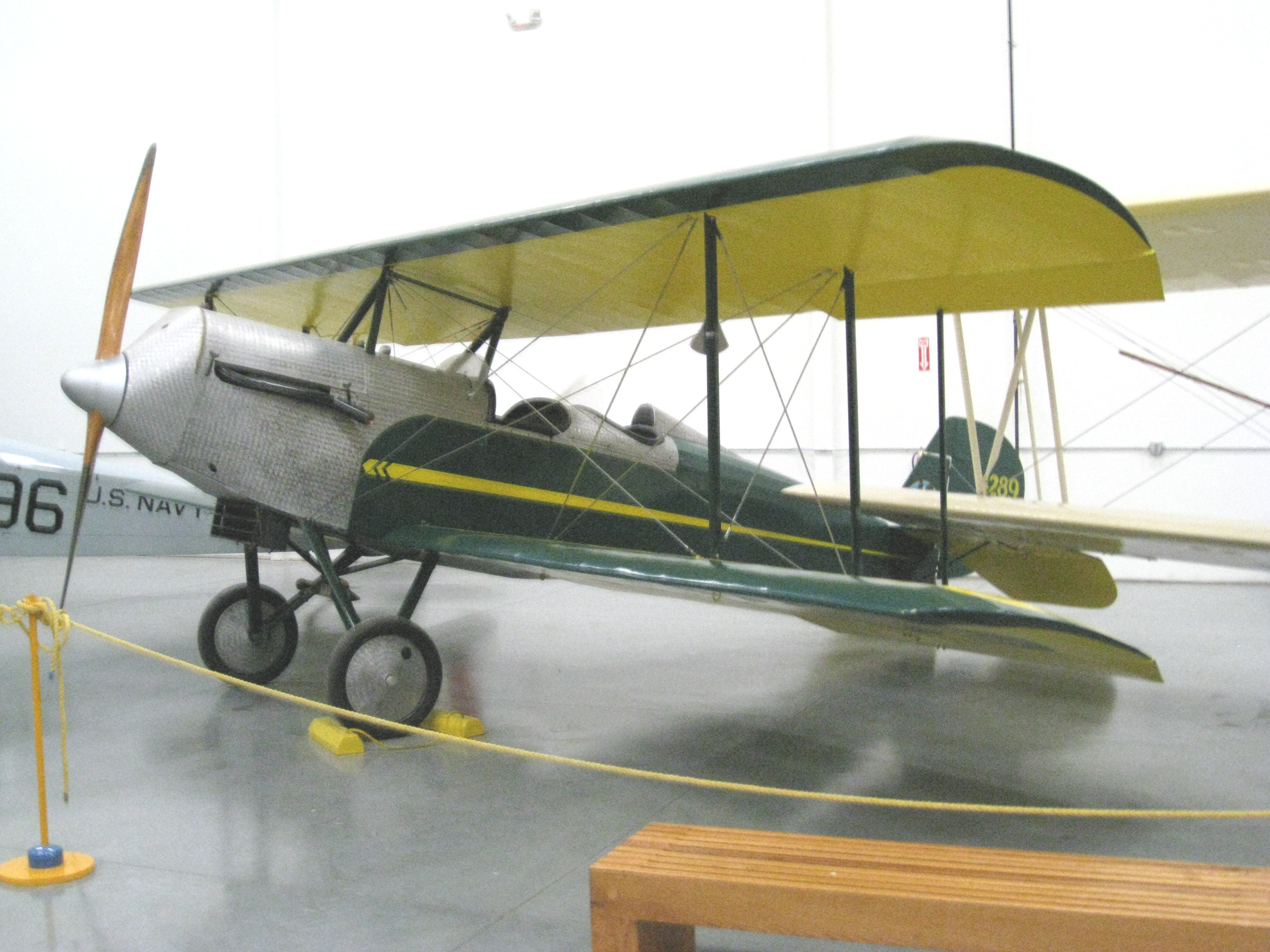
American Eagle A-101 on display in the Yanks Air Museum at Chino, California in January 2008

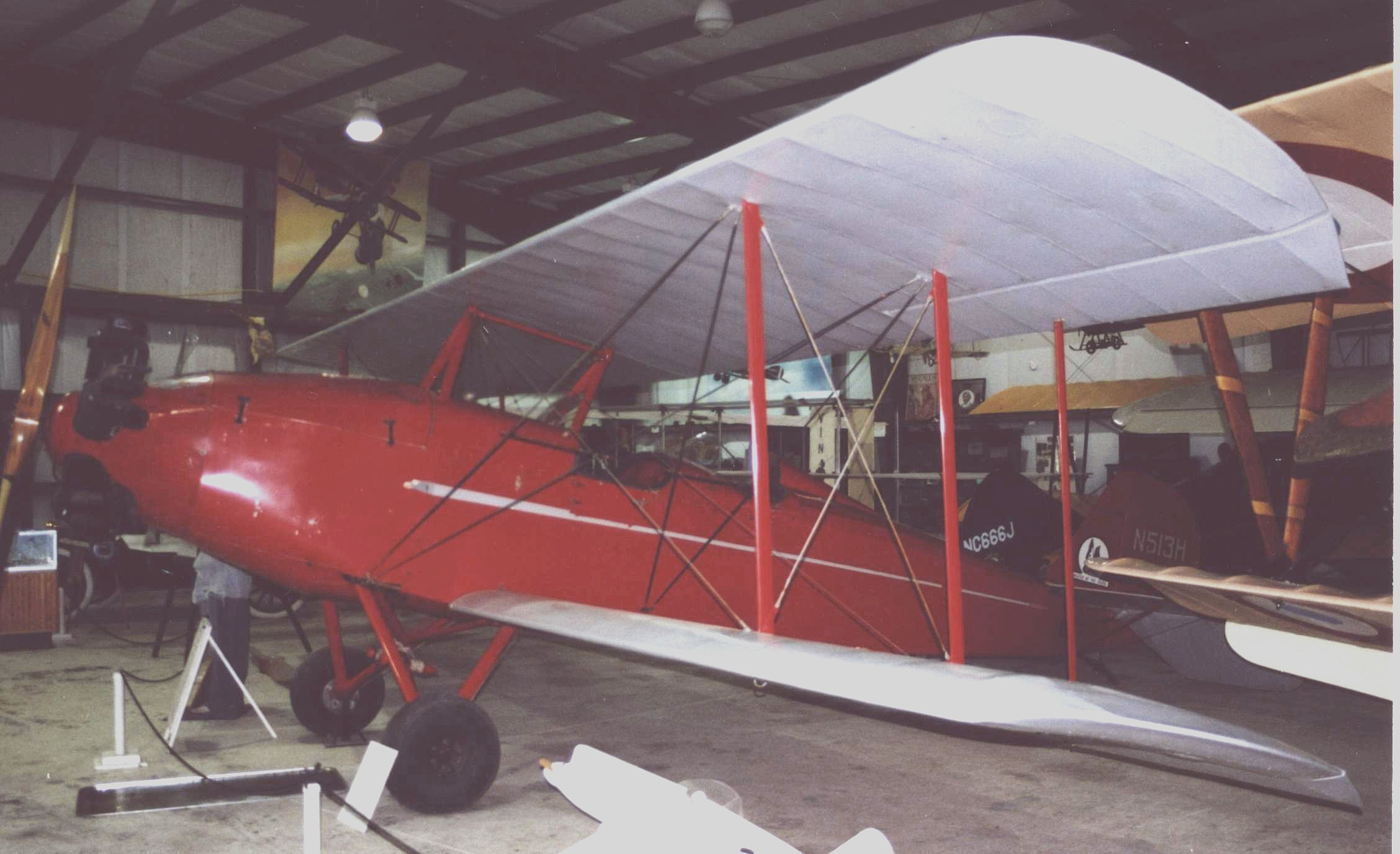
American Eagle A-129 with Kinner K-5 engine at Old Rhinebeck Aerodrome, NY, in June 2005

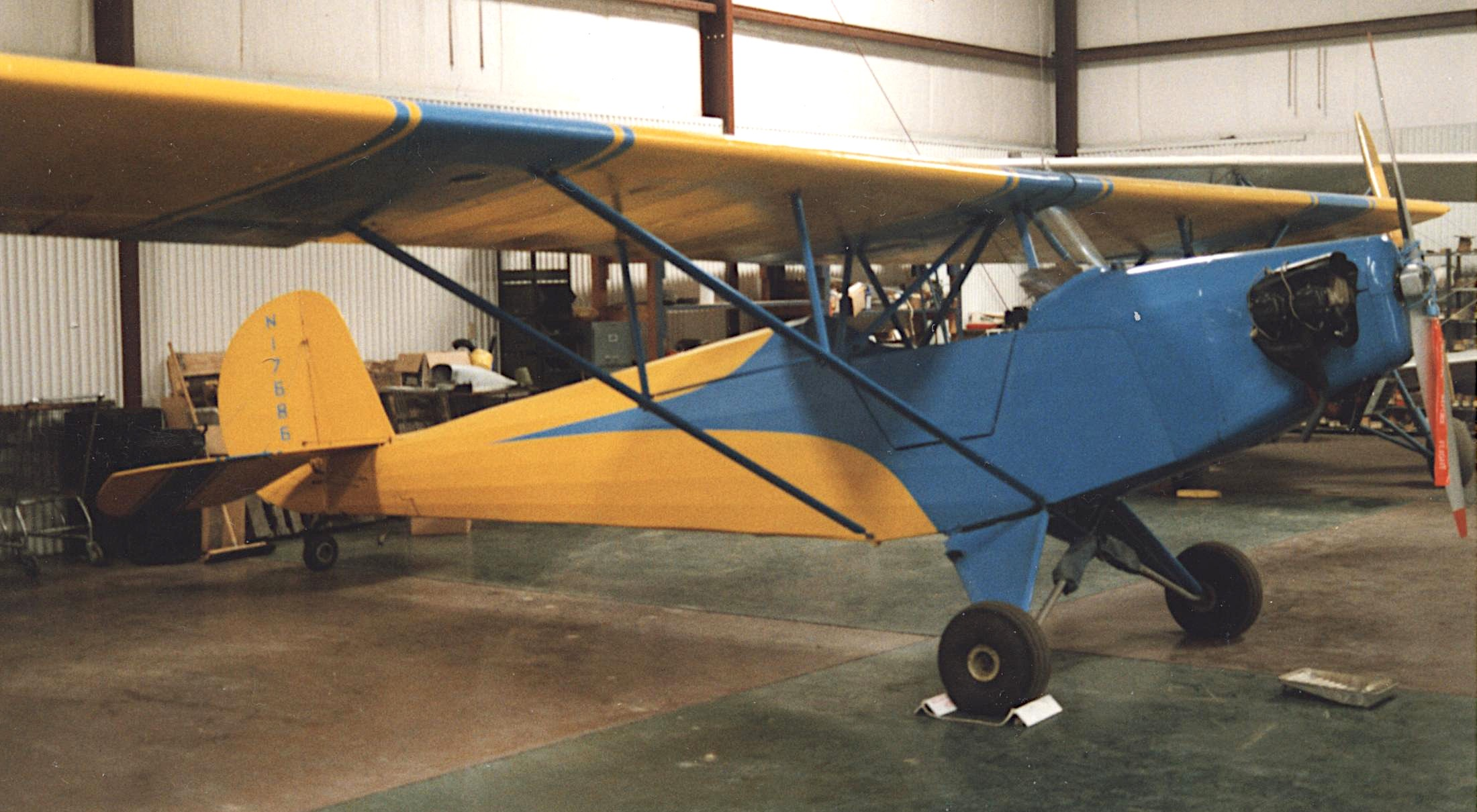
Eaglet B-31 of 1931 at Santa Fe airfield, New Mexico, in June 1995

The American Eagle Aircraft Corporation was an American aircraft design and manufacturing company which existed briefly in Kansas, but which was a victim of the Great Depression, after building some 500 light airplanes, many of which were the Model A-129, a design attributed to noted aviation pioneer Giuseppe Mario Bellanca.

== History ==
The American Eagle Aircraft Corporation was started in 1925 in Kansas City, Kansas by Edward E. Porterfield. It was incorporated in Delaware in September 1928.

Porterfield was running a flying school at the Fairfax Airport outside Kansas City. He had been operating Jennies and Lincoln Standard biplane trainers, and felt the need for a more suitable and better-performing trainer aircraft. He consulted with several aeronautical engineers of the period, including Bellanca, and soon launched the production of several light single-engine two-seat high-wing and biplane aircraft. In July 1929, it purchased the Wallace Aircraft Company. By June 1930, J. Carroll Cone – along with his assistant Joseph A. Young – had joined the company as vice president of sales.

Late in 1929, the worldwide stock market crash severely depressed the sale of non-essential items such as sport airplanes, although American Eagle continued producing airplanes until 1931. Early in that year, Porterfield's company declared bankruptcy and halted production. On 14 May 1931, the company's assets were purchased by the Lincoln Aircraft Company of Lincoln, Nebraska, which became the American Eagle-Lincoln Aircraft Corporation. To satisfy concerns about potential competition if he were to found his own aircraft manufacturer, Porterfield signed a contract with the new company to stay on as aircraft sales representative for two months.

Following the expiration of his contract, Porterfield left the company in July 1931. He would later go on to form the Porterfield Aircraft Corporation, and died of a heart attack in 1948. Victor Roos, already president of the Lincoln Aircraft Company, continued as president of the American Eagle-Lincoln Aircraft Corporation. Most of the new company's effort went into producing the Eaglet, but the depth of the Depression soon killed this effort. However, it did not stop the company from considering investing in a new factory in Florida.

During the six years of its existence, the American Eagle company (including its merged existence with Lincoln) produced over 700 airplanes. At the time of the Depression it was the world's third-largest aircraft production company.

== Aircraft ==
| Model name | First flight | Number built | Type |
|---|---|---|---|
| American Eagle A-101 | 1926 | | Single engine open cockpit biplane |
| American Eagle A-101 | | | Single engine open cockpit biplane |
| American Eagle A-129 | 1929 | 400+ | Single engine open cockpit biplane |
| American Eagle A-139 | | 24 | Single engine open cockpit biplane |
| American Eagle A-201 | | 44 | Single engine open cockpit biplane |
| American Eagle A-229 | | | Single engine open cockpit biplane |
| American Eagle A-251 Phaeton | | | Single engine open cockpit biplane |
| American Eagle A-329 | | | Single engine cabin monoplane |
| American Eagle A-330 | | | Single engine cabin monoplane |
| American Eagle A-429 | | 2 | Single engine open cockpit biplane |
| American Eagle A-430 | | 2 | Single engine cabin monoplane |
| American Eagle A-529 | | 0 | Twin engine airplane |
| American Eagle A-629 | | 1 | Twin engine monoplane |
| American Eagle A-230 Eaglet | 1930 | | Single engine open cockpit monoplane |
| American Eagle A-231 Eaglet | | | Single engine open cockpit monoplane |
| American Eagle A-31 Eaglet | | | Single engine open cockpit monoplane |
| American Eagle B-31 Eaglet | | | Single engine open cockpit monoplane |
| American Eagle B-32 Eaglet | | | Single engine open cockpit monoplane |
| American Eagle D-430 | | 1 or 2 | Single engine cabin monoplane |
| American Eagle E-430 | | 5 | Single engine cabin monoplane |
