= Shotwell =

Shotwell may refer to:

- Shotwell, North Carolina, settlement in United States
- Shotwell (software), image organizer for the Linux operating system
- 19818 Shotwell, asteroid
- Shotwell Stadium, stadium in Abilene, Texas, United States

== People with surname Shotwell ==
- Charlie Shotwell (b. 2007), American actor
- George Shotwell, American football player
- Gwynne Shotwell, President and COO of SpaceX
- James T. Shotwell (1874–1965), Canadian historian
- Louisa R. Shotwell (1902–1993), American writer and college administrator
- Marie Shotwell (1880–1934), American actress
- P. E. Shotwell (1893–1978), American football coach
