= Donald Mattison =

American artist (1905–1975)

Donald Magnus Mattison (April 24, 1905 – July 28, 1975) was an American artist born in Beloit, Wisconsin. His father, Magnus Wilhelm Mattison, invented machine tools, and his mother, Florence May Knickerbocker Mattison, taught school. Mattison also had two sisters, Dorothy M. Spaugh and Ruth M. Eaton. He spent his early youth in Wisconsin, but the family relocated to Winston-Salem, North Carolina in 1920.

== Education ==
Mattison attended Yale University, where he excelled as a draftsman and painter, and took an interest in boxing. After completing the usual five-year program in only four years, Mattison graduated marshal of his class with a Bachelor of Fine Arts degree.

== Personal life ==
Mattison moved to Chicago in 1927 to work as an assistant for respected American muralist Eugene Savage. Mattison went on to produce notable murals and easel paintings of figures and landscape subjects, but turned to portraiture later in his career. In 1928 Mattison won the Prix de Rome, a scholarship for art students that provided the opportunity to study overseas. Because the Prix de Rome was only offered to single students due to funding restrictions, he and Catherine Lucille Morrison waited until July 17, 1928, after Mattison had already won the prize, to be married. Morrison, a watercolorist from New Haven, studied at the British Academy in Rome. They spent the next three years in Europe, where Mattison was a fellow at the American Academy in Rome. The couple had one daughter, Georgia, during their last year in Europe.

After his fellowship ended, Mattison moved his young family back to the United States where he found it necessary to take up three jobs to support their growing needs. At one point, he taught at three schools in one day, spending his mornings at New York University, his afternoons at Columbia University, and his evenings at the New York School of Design. In 1933, Mattison found a permanent full-time position when he was appointed the dean of John Herron Art School in Indianapolis, Indiana, where he continued to teach art classes.

Mattison's wife Catherine died of a stroke in May 1961. He later married Mary Gebhart Wheeler, who had three children from a previous marriage, Marrianne Williams Ullyot, Jane Williams Barr, and Russell Willams Jr. The two remained together until Mattison's death in 1975. He died at Methodist Hospital in Indianapolis, Indiana.

== Art ==
=== Training and early work ===
Mattison showed an interest in art from an early age. He had unwavering confidence in his decision to pursue a career in art, promising childhood friend, Robert Cooke, that he would paint his portrait one day when he was "a famous portrait painter".

At Yale, Mattison studied under Eugene Savage, a Covington, Indiana, native and accomplished muralist. Throughout 1927 and 1928, he assisted Savage in his completion of the murals in the Elks National Veterans Memorial in Chicago while still keeping up with the demands of the rigorous Yale arts program.

In 1928, Mattison won one of the two most coveted awards in the world of the student artist. He was awarded the Prix de Rome for painting, which included a three-year scholarship to the American Academy in Rome and an annual stipend of $1500. His mythically inspired piece, Ignis Fatuus, depicts a scene based on a Roman legend. According to the myth, wood nymphs lured thrill seekers across the bogs of Rome to discover the origin of the mysterious fires that burned there. In Mattison's painting, a man is sinking in the bog, desperately reaching out at the fiery nymphs who had tricked him into his doom.

=== Style and process ===
Mattison's style was reflective of the classical training he received. Though he had no opposition to abstract and modern art forms, Mattison was a realist painter. He strove to convey the everyday in a new and beautiful light. "There will always be a demand for styles that mean art to a majority of people" Mattison explained of his traditional style to reporters at the Florida Artist Symposium in 1960.

When working on a piece, Mattison progressed through a series of sketches, each one containing more detail than its predecessor. Once thoroughly satisfied with every detail of a sketch, Mattison would begin to paint. "Lucky is the painter who is able to rush to his canvas and with a few strokes of the brush put down quickly a complete and meaningful picture", Mattison told American Artist reporter Ernest W. Watson in 1947.

Mattison's style has been compared to that of Rembrandt: using both color and light to highlight aspects of emotion and movement. While designing a piece, Mattison would focus on a single emotive state for his subjects. His chief concern when painting was to fully convey that emotion. "I like to think of the finished picture as an ideal blend of means and meaning, each inseparable from the other."

=== Works ===
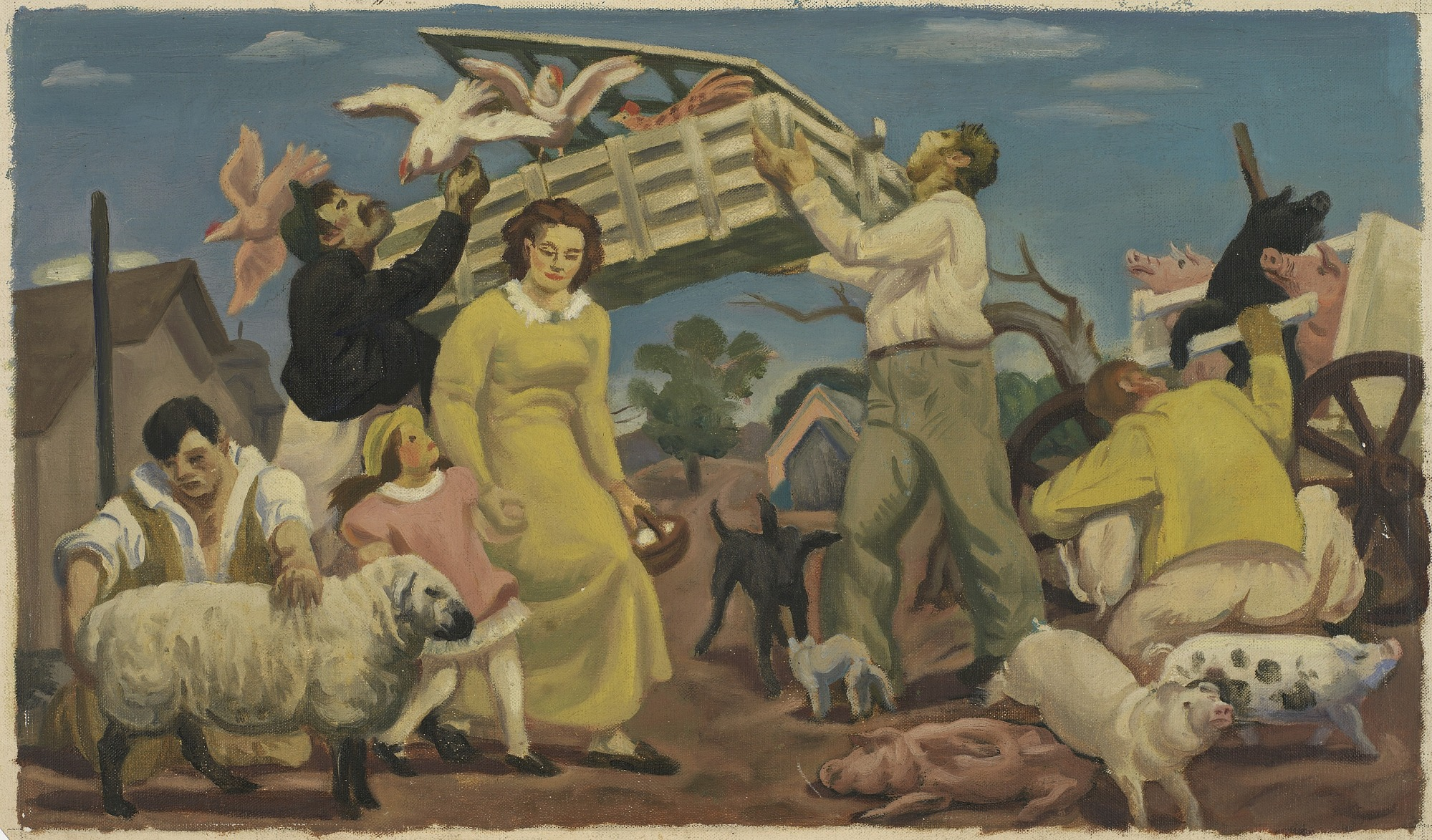
Study for Indiana Farming (1937), Mattison's mural for the post office in Tipton, Indiana

In his paintings, Mattison preferred to depict "life's pleasanter moments": beautiful landscapes, community celebrations, the innocent pastimes of children. Director of the John Herron Art Museum and colleague of Mattison, W. D. Peat, claimed that Mattison's work was a graphic representation of his cheerful outlook on life. He worked predominantly in oils and was universally praised for his use of color. Some of his better-known paintings include: Excursion (1936), Riverboat (1945), Carnival (1945), Parade, Concert and Birthday Party.

Mattison also dabbled in lithography. From the mid-1930s through the 1940s, Mattison produced numerous works in this style. In 1935, Mattison completed what is arguably the most prominent of all his pieces: Negro Baptism, debuted at the Art Institute of Chicago's International Lithography and Wood-Engraving Exhibition. This piece is currently part of the Indianapolis Museum of Art's permanent collection. The IMA also houses Goodby (1943), Army War Show (1943), Three Girls at an Amusement Park (1939), Excursion (1936), and Summer Siesta from this same period.

His mural training at Yale with Eugene Savage proved beneficial to him later on in his career. He was contracted to paint murals for the Cities Service Building in New York City and the Standard Life Insurance Building in Indianapolis, among other private and public projects.

Mattison was also chosen among a select group of Indiana artists to participate in a New Deal art initiative. In 1937, he was commissioned by the Treasury Section of Painting and Sculpture to paint murals for the post offices in Tipton and Union City, Indiana. Though the Union City mural was destroyed in renovations, the Tipton mural, aptly titled Indiana Farming, remains to this day.

As time progressed, Mattison also established himself as an accomplished portraitist, completing more than 150 portraits in his lifetime. His subjects included: U.S. Supreme Court Justices Thurgood Marshall and Sherman Minton, Indiana Governors Paul McNutt and Harold W. Handley, author Booth Tarkington, and Emil Schram, former president of the New York Stock Exchange. Each portrait took Mattison approximately six weeks to complete. Reviews of Mattison's portrait work contain nothing but praise. His amazing accuracy of detail compliments his subjects without blatant flattery. As he said himself, "Our lilies do not require gilding."

=== Exhibition ===
Throughout his career, Mattison's work was most frequently exhibited within general exhibits; only exhibiting his work in large collections on a few occasions throughout his life. One such occasion was the 25th anniversary celebration of his deanship, which included an exhibition at the Herron Art Museum that featured more than 26 pieces. His work has also been exhibited in the following institutions:

- The National Academy of Design, New York
- The Metropolitan Museum of Art, New York
- The Pennsylvania Academy of Fine Arts, Philadelphia
- The Art Institute of Chicago
- The Corcoran Gallery, Washington D.C.
- California Palace of the Legion of Honor

=== Passion for art ===
Even after accepting the deanship at Herron, Mattison maintained art as one of his highest priorities. He spent no less than two hours working in his studio each week. As he told Indianapolis Star journalist Rosanna Hall, "When others are out playing golf, I am in my studio painting." He remained artist in residence at Herron even after his retirement.

== Herron School of Art ==
=== Career as dean ===
I believe that my career as an artist is the basis for my work as dean of Herron.

— Donald Mattison

Herron School of Art went without a dean for seven years until the school hired 27-year-old Donald Mattison of New York. Mattison was quickly acknowledged as an "able manager, devoted and persevering in his work", although some of the students and faculty were not happy with him initially. During one of Mattison's first visits to Herron, he decided to let go of a few of the students favorite professors and restructured classes and schedules. He also extended the hours that students must attend classes and required students to take studio-workshops on Saturdays. Previously students only received pass or fail grades, and Mattison instituted letter-grades. Students responded by hanging an effigy named "Matt" from a tree on campus grounds. Though Mattison was out of town at the time, the Indianapolis Star printed a story and a photograph showing a small gathering of smiling, rebellious students standing beneath the effigy.

=== Changes at Herron ===
To put emphasis on the classes that he thought were important for all artists, Mattison made many changes to course offerings also. Mattison restructured the departments at Herron to include painting, sculpture, advertising art, and teacher training. A partnership with nearby Butler University was also eventually formed and the school also began offering classes for children on the weekends and seminars for grade school art teachers. School expenditures were reduced more than $14,000 during Mattison's first year as dean, but the school still charged $80 a semester for full-time tuition in 1933. Because of the profit that the school was making, visiting professors could be hired to teach courses that Herron did not offer.

During Mattison's first few years at Herron, the first issue of The Chronicle was printed. The newspaper provided information about the school and news of past and present students and their work. Mattison encouraged his students to submit their works to competitions so The Chronicle was a perfect outlet to showcase student achievements. "Mattison ... intended that Herron students set their sights beyond Indiana ... [and] encourage[d] his students to compete for the Prix de Rome and the Chaloner Paris Prize – for which no Herron student has previously tried."

Though students and faculty might have been unhappy with Mattison at first, they began to see that he was a dedicated artist, professor, and dean. Mattison taught Life Painting and Advanced Composition among a few other art courses over the years. Students remembered him for always leaving his office door open; "when I needed help, he just seemed to understand without my having to give any explanation. He called me by name. That made me feel like a person. I know there is someone I can go to if I get into a spot" said one of his students.

World War II and Vietnam War saw many changes even at Herron. The majority of the student body during WWII were women because "many ... [male] students and graduates, new in the armed services, found art-related duty as draftsman, camefleurs, mapmakers, or illustrators." Professors were also drafted and Mattison was forced to take over teaching a still life painting course on top of his normal course load. At the June 1963 commencement, instead of reading the honor roll as usual, Mattison read the names of Herron students serving the country.

== Retirement and death ==
In 1967 the Herron School of Art became a department of Indiana University. Shortly after, Mattison retired as dean at the age of 65 in 1970. But even after retirement, Mattison remained as member of the Herron School Committee, which governed in the absence of the dean from 1973 to 1974. Mattison died on July 28, 1975. Students and faculty dedicated a plaque to Mattison which still hangs outside the dean's office. It reads "under his thoughtful direction and counsel, this school grew and matured—yet was kept young responding to a changing world."

== Sources ==
- Adams, Joe (February 12, 1961). "Hoosier Personality: Famous Artist and Teacher". The Indianapolis Star.
- Compton, Ann L. Herron School of Art: The Mattison Years 1933–1970. Indianapolis
- "Obituary: Donald Mattison". The Indianapolis Star. July 1975.
