= Lonzo Anderson =

American children's author (1905–1993)

- Born: John Lonzo Anderson; March 1, 1905 near Ellijay, Georgia, U.S.
- Died: April 23, 1993 (aged 88); San Marcos, Texas, U.S.
- Occupation: Children's author
- Spouse: Adrienne Adams (m. 1934)

John Lonzo Anderson (March 1, 1905 – April 23, 1993) was an American children's author. He was the husband of illustrator and Caldecott Honor recipient Adrienne Adams, with whom he collaborated during 1942–1978.

== Early life and education ==
Lonzo Anderson was born on March 1, 1905, near Ellijay, Georgia, as the only child of mother Adella (Brown) Anderson. His father, John Lonzo Anderson, was a "circuit rider, or country preacher" serving the local Northern Methodist community. Both of his parents worked at a country school: John Lonzo was the principal on weekdays, and Adella was a teacher. On February 20, 1905, ten days before his son was born—and almost one year after his marriage to Adella—he drowned in the vicinity of the Cartecay River while "trying to cross a swollen stream on horseback after a storm, on his way to work"; the body was not found until late April.

At age three, the younger Lonzo wrote his first story through dictation for Adella; as he quipped in a 1972 autobiographical profile, "It would be pretty embarrassing to read [it] now." During his youth, he spent his time unsupervised outdoors, leading him to later remark: "I grew up rather like a rabbit, barefoot, with freedom to wander far and wide and learn about nature by being up to my chin in it." This experience would later anticipate his work on Two Hundred Rabbits in 1968. Later on, amid transient education and employment, he attended Northwestern University, and went on to graduate from Harvard University in 1928.

== Professional career ==
The year after his graduation, Anderson went to New York City, where he took a job as a statistician for the United States Rubber Company. At one of his next places of employment, a children's furniture factory, he met future wife and artist Adrienne Adams. During the Great Depression, the couple lived in a Greenwich Village studio; they married on August 17, 1934. They would collaborate on many children's books over the course of 36 years, starting with his first title, 1942's Bag of Smoke (based on the life of the Montgolfier brothers). In 1953, willing to get closer to nature, they moved to a Lebanon Township, New Jersey, residence that later occupied 30 acres (12 ha) of land. In addition to writing, Anderson worked as a real estate broker in Hunterdon County.

By the 1970s, Anderson and Adams sojourned during winter season in the United States Virgin Islands, where three of his later books—Izzard (1973), The Day the Hurricane Happened (1974), and Night of the Silent Drums (1975)—were set; in this capacity, they were based in St. John. Anderson spent five years developing Silent Drums, and traveled to Moravia, Pennsylvania and Copenhagen, Denmark, among other places, for its research. During that time, he undertook research for his works in nine foreign languages: "French, Spanish, Danish, German, Dutch, Swedish, Italian, Portuguese, and Latin, in that order of competence." Furthermore, he said in 1972: "Our chief interest outside of our work—perhaps even more than our work—is the brotherhood of man."

== Personal life ==
Although they had no direct children, Anderson and Adams raised two foster children of indigenous American ancestry–one from Bogotá, Colombia, the other in New Mexico's San Ildefonso Pueblo. Later in their lives, the author and illustrator lived in Wimberley Hills, Texas. Anderson died on April 23, 1993, in San Marcos, Texas, in the Hays County Nursing Home; Adams was living in San Marcos' Camlu locale at the time. Upon his death, he left behind "an unfinished manuscript of the conversations of two men trying to understand how each other's minds work", and in his will bequeathed royalties from Silent Drums to the St. John School of the Arts in the U.S.V.I. As of 2023, a collection of his papers is held by the Children's Literature Research Collections of the University of Minnesota Libraries.

== Name ==
Anderson began his autobiographical profile thus:

The name I sign to letters and checks is John L. Anderson. The "L" stands for "Lonzo", my father's name. I use Lonzo Anderson for my writing because there are so many John Andersons who are or have been writers.

== Bibliography ==
=== As solo author ===
- Night of the Silent Drums (1975)

=== With Adrienne Adams ===
==== The Halloween Party ====
In Anderson's The Halloween Party (ISBN 0-684-14002-0), a boy named Faraday Folsom—dressed as a ghost—follows two witches to a party held by goblins and other witches. Published in September 1974 by Scribner, the 28-page picture book was recommended by the School Library Journal, while William J. Curtis of The Reading Teacher deemed the story and illustrations "delightful" for young readers. Both SLJ and the Bulletin of the Center for Children's Books praised Adams' dark-colored illustrations, but the latter publication commented that the plot "is not convincing even within the fanciful framework."

==== Other titles ====
- Bag of Smoke (1942)
- A Fifteenth Century Cookry Boke (1962)
- Ponies of Mykilliengi (1966)
- Two Hundred Rabbits (1968)
- Mr. Biddle and the Birds (1971)
- Izzard (1973)
- Arion and the Dolphins (1978)

=== With other illustrators ===
==== Zeb ====
A chronicle of a pioneer boy's survival in the Delaware River wilderness of 1680, Zeb was published by Knopf in 1966 with illustrations by Peter Burchard.

==== The Haganinny ====
Published in 1973 by Ginn, The Haganinny was illustrated by Susan Harris Andersen. In Language Play (2001), David Crystal described Anderson's coinages for the book as "a cross between Lewis Carroll and Star Wars".

==== The Day the Hurricane Happened ====
Set in St. John, The Day the Hurricane Happened was based on stories of tropical cyclones Anderson received from native Virgin Islanders during his research for Silent Drums. Reviews were mixed; while the St. Louis Post Dispatch complimented the author on handling the subject "capably and compassionately", the Los Angeles Times found Ann Grifalconi's illustrations at odds with the menace promised in its title. Originally a 40-page publication in Scribner's 1974 catalog, Hurricane received a one-page reprint as a September 1992 special in The Miami Herald.

=== Unfinished ===
Early in the 1990s, Anderson was developing a story called Body of Work, set in St. Thomas in the 18th-century Danish West Indies. It was listed as a "Work in Progress" in Gale's 1992 edition of Contemporary Authors.

== Accolades ==
In 1968, Anderson and Adams' Two Hundred Rabbits was a selection of the Junior Literary Guild, as well as an ALA Notable Book. Another of the couple's books, The Halloween Party, was among several dozen works under consideration for the Caldecott Medal in August 1974. (Adams herself was a Caldecott Honor recipient in the early 1960s for two Alice E. Goudey titles, Houses from the Sea and The Day We Saw the Sun Come Up.)
