= Adrienne Adams =

Adrienne Adams may refer to:

- Adrienne Adams (illustrator) (1906–2002), American illustrator
- Adrienne Adams (politician) (born 1960), American politician
