= Aileen Fisher =

American writer (1906-2002)

- Aileen Fisher
- Born: September 9, 1906; Iron River, Michigan, U.S.
- Died: December 2, 2002 (aged 96); Boulder, Colorado, U.S.
- Education: University of Chicago, University of Missouri School of Journalism, BA (1927)
- Occupations: Children's writer, poet, playwright
- Writing career
- Notable works: "Otherwise" "After a Bath"; Valley of the Smallest
- Notable awards: NCTE Award for Excellence in Poetry for Children

Aileen Lucia Fisher (September 9, 1906 – December 2, 2002) was an American writer of more than a hundred children's books, including poetry, picture books in verse, prose about nature and America, biographies, Bible-themed books, plays, and articles for magazines and journals. Her poems have been anthologized many times and are frequently used in textbooks. In 1978 she was awarded the second National Council of Teachers of English Award for Excellence in Poetry for Children. Born in Michigan, Fisher moved to Colorado as an adult and lived there for the rest of her life.

== Life ==
Aileen Fisher was born on September 9, 1906, in Iron River, on the Upper Peninsula of Michigan, to Nelson E. and Lucia (Milker) Fisher. Her father was a homesteader who established several businesses in the area. Her mother had been a kindergarten teacher. When she was five years old, poor health caused her father to retire to 40 acres near the Iron River in the Upper Peninsula of Michigan, where he built a home called High Banks. She and her brother, Leslie Paul, spent much of their time playing in the nearby river, walking country roads, and taking care of their farm animals. On Aileen's eighth birthday her baby sister, Lucia, arrived; considering her a birthday present, Aileen soon began taking care of her. Another sister, Beth, was born six years later.

Fisher attended the University of Chicago for two years, then transferred to the University of Missouri in order to obtain a BA in journalism in 1927. After graduating she took a summer job in a small theater, then returned to Chicago. She was working as an assistant in a placement bureau for women journalists, then as the director for the Women's National Journalistic Register.

In 1933, wanting to live someplace that had beautiful scenery, a good library and an "invigorating climate", Fisher moved with an attorney and fellow writer Olive Rabe to Boulder, Colorado. Five years later they bought a 200-acre ranch in Sunshine Canyon, at the foot of Flagstaff Mountain. They lived there, totally off-the-grid, for thirty years. An active woman who loved the outdoors, she and Olive designed and built the cabin on their ranch. As Fisher explained in 1948, “We bought the ranch, built a cabin, got a dog — and now we don’t care if we ever leave Boulder county”. Her other interests included reading, woodworking, hiking and mountain climbing.

Aileen Fisher died at the age of 96 at her home in Boulder, Colorado. Her papers are held in libraries at Southern Mississippi University and Stanford University.

== Writing ==
According to Fisher, "Poetry is a rhythmical piece of writing that leaves the reader feeling that life is a little richer than before, a little more full of wonder, beauty, or just plain delight." And, despite the great variety found in her writing, she thought of herself primarily as a poet. "My first and chief love in writing is writing children's verse." The first work she sold, to Child Life magazine in 1927, was "Otherwise". This nine-line poem, opening "There must be magic, Otherwise, How could day turn into night?", has been reprinted in a number of anthologies and is still used in schools. Fisher continued to sell to poetry magazines after the publication of her first volume, The Coffee-Pot Face, in 1933. A collection of poems about everyday things like lady bugs, tummy aches and icicles, it was illustrated by her own silhouette drawings, and became a Junior Literary Guild Selection.

More than twenty poetry collections followed, including Up the Windy Hill: A Book of Merry Verses with Silhouettes, and You Don’t Look Like Your Mother, re-released in 2001. Her books have been illustrated by prominent artists including Eric Carle, Adrienne Adams, Symeon Shimin, and Mique Moriuchi. In 1991 Harper Collins published Always Wondering: Some Favorite Poems of Aileen Fisher, selected by the author from some of her most requested and anthologized pieces. I Heard a Bluebird Sing, is a posthumous collection of her poems chosen for inclusion by the votes of school children around the US, along with excerpts from interviews and articles she had written. Fisher's poems continue to appear in anthologies and several of her collections have been re-released after her death, leading her to be included by one reviewer on a short list of "some of the luminaries in recent children's poetry".

Fisher wrote both rhyming and prose non-fiction books, many of them focusing on natural history. One of her personal favorites was Valley of the Smallest: The Life Story of the Shrew, which received the Western Writers of America Spur Award for juvenile non-fiction, was named a Hans Christian Andersen Honor Book, and placed on Horn Book Magazine's Best Books of the Year list. It follows the life of an adult masked shrew living, like Fisher, in a valley in the Colorado Rocky Mountains. Other award-winning natural history books include Feathered Ones and Furry, illustrated by Eric Carle, and In the Woods, In the Meadow, In the Sky.

Fisher published plays for children, frequently about holidays or with patriotic or historic themes. Some of these were written with other co-writers, including Olive Rabe. They also collaborated on biographies about Emily Dickinson and Louisa May Alcott.

She also collaborated with composer George Lynn by writing lyrics for children's Christmas anthems, a song cycle called "The Ladybug and Her Friends" and a folk opera called "The Violinden Tree".

== Critical reception ==
In 1958, New York Times reviewer Anzia Yezierska said that Fisher "lights the commonplace moment with wonder." According to the Poetry Foundation, her poems are "suffused with curiosity and love for the workings of the natural world." Kirkus Reviews called her verse "deftly evocative". The New York Times Book Review called her "a true poet, no mere light versifier." In I Heard a Bluebird Sing Boyds Mill Press said, "her work is forever fresh and timeless. With a child's heart and a knowing hand, she has honed simple words and ideas into small poetic gems that shine with clarity and sensitivity… This important anthology celebrates the work of one of America's beloved writers for young people."

Fisher's natural history rhyming texts were often well received. Of Going Barefoot, a Kirkus reviewer wrote, "This rhymed text imparts a substantial amount of naturalist information in a pleasant and animated fashion." The factual content of her books was often praised. About All on a Mountain Day, Saturday Review wrote "There is a real feeling for these animals and the part each plays—the hunted and the hunters— in the over-all pattern of nature."

Her historical novels have been called "rich in detail", and "emotionally appealing". The Horn Book said, We Alcotts "Captures the aura of their lives, permits them to speak for themselves, and reveals the humors and rigors of their situation." In Jeanne d'Arc, "The familiar story is beautifully retold for young readers, with just enough historical background and a reverent simplicity." National Council of Teachers of English complimented her "energizing American history prose against a background of place geography and basic information", and goes on to say, "Miss Fisher knows human nature."

Not everyone praised all her works so highly, however. Kirkus reviewed the award-winning Feathered Ones and Furry as a "collection of coy and innocuous little animal rhymes. The verses are technically conventional, with rhythm and rhyme schemes ranging from mildly pleasant to flatly predictable". Again, writing of In the Middle of the Night, in which a little girl celebrates her birthday by taking a special night time walk with her Father, Kirkus said, "The bibliotherapeutic possibilities perhaps outweigh anything that might be said about the poem as poetry".

== Selected works ==
=== Poetry collections ===
- The Coffee-Pot Faces, McBride Company, 1933*
- Up the Windy Hill: A Book of Merry Verses with Silhouettes, Abelard Press, 1953
- My Cat Has Eyes of Sapphire Blue, Crowell, 1973
- Feathered Ones and Furry, HarperCollins, 1979*
- Rabbits, Rabbits, Harper & Row, 1983
- Always Wondering": Some Favorite Poems of Aileen Fisher, HarperCollins, 1991
- You Don’t Look Like Your Mother, Mondo, 2001
- I Heard a Bluebird Singing; Cullinan, Bernice (compiler); Boyds Mills Press; 2002

=== Natural history ===
- All on a Mountain Day Thomas Nelson and Sons, 1956*
- Going Barefooted, Crowell, 1960^
- Summer of Little Rain, Thomas Nelson, 1961*
- Where Does Everyone Go?, Crowell, 1961^
- Listen, Rabbit, T. Y. Crowell, 1964^
- In the Woods, In the Meadow, In the Sky, Scribner, 1962
- In the Middle of the Night, Crowell, 1965^
- Valley of the Smallest: The Life of the Shrew, T. Y. Crowell, 1966^>+#
- Feathered Ones and Furry, Harper Collins, 1979*
- Trapped by the Mountain Storm, Rod and Staff Publishers, Inc, 1992
- The Story Goes On, Roaring Brook Press, 2005

=== Fiction ===
- A Lantern in the Window, T. Nelson, 1957
- Going Barefoot, T. Y. Crowell, 1960
- Secret in the Barrel, Scholastic Books, 1965
- In the Middle Of The Night, T. Y. Crowell, 1965
- Best Little House, T. Y. Crowell, 1966
- My Mother and I, T. Y. Crowell, 1967
- We Went Looking, T. Y. Crowell, 1968
- Clean as a Whistle, T. Y. Crowell, 1969

=== Other non-fiction ===
- Timber!:Logging in Michigan, Aladdin Books, 1955
- Skip, Thomas Nelson, 1958 (Scholastic paperback)^
- We Dickinsons: The Life of Emily Dickinson as Seen Through the Eyes of Her Brother Austin (with Olive Rabe), Atheneum, 1965*
- We Alcotts: The Life of Louisa M. Alcott's Family as Seen Through the Eyes of 'Marmee', Mother of Little Women, Atheneum, 1968>
- Jeanne D'Arc, Crowell, 1970
- My First Hanukkah Book, Children's Press, 1985

=== Plays ===
- Holiday Programs for Boys and Girls, Plays, Inc., 1953
- Christmas Plays and Programs, Plays, Inc., 1961
- Plays About our Nation's Songs, Plays, Inc., 1962
- Bicentennial Plays and Programs, Plays, Inc., 1975
- Up a Christmas Tree, Plays, Inc., 1978
- Blue Ribbon Plays for Girls, Plays, Inc., 1981
- Year-Round Programs for Young Players, Plays, Inc., 1985

=== Other publications ===
- Ways of Plants and The Ways of Animals, Bowmar, Inc., 1974 (Both are part of the multimedia Bowmar Nature Series of ten rhyming nature books, cassette recordings of the books, corresponding films and teacher's guides.)

The Ways of Plants: And a Sunflower Grew, As the Leaves Fall Down, A Tree with a Thousand Uses, Mysteries in the Garden, Now that Spring is Here, Petals Yellow and Petals Red, Plant Magic, Prize Performance, Seeds on the Go, Swords and Daggers.
Ways of Animals: Animal Disguises, Animal Houses, Animal Jackets, Filling the Bill, Going Places, No Accounting for Taste, Now that Days are Colder, Sleepy Heads, Tail Twisters, You Don't Look Like Your Mother.

- Our Christmas Book, Abingdon Press, 1984 (a collection of fiction, non-fiction, skits and crafts)

=== Anthologies ===
- Cullinan, Bernice (editor); A Jar of Tiny Stars: Poems by NCTE Award-Winning Poets; Wordsong/Boyds Mills; 1996
- Hopkins, Lee Bennet (editor); Small Talk: A Short Book of Poems; 1995
- Kennedy, Dorothy (editor); I Thought I'd Take My Rat to School; Little, Brown; 1993
- Meltzer, Milton (editor); Hour of Freedom; Wordsong/Boyds Mills; 2003
- Paladino, Catherine (editor); Land, Sea, and Sky; Little, Brown; 1993
- Sampson, Michael (editor); The Bill Martin Jr. Big Book of Poetry; Simon & Schuster; 2008

* Junior Library Guild Selection

^ Annual ALA Notable Books List

> The Horn Book Magazine Best Books of the Year

+ International Board on Books for Young People Honor Book

# Western Writers of America Spur Award

== Learn more ==
"After a Bath". Aileen Fisher. Archived from the original on 2014-03-03.

Biography – Fisher, Aileen (Lucia) (1906-2002): An Article from: Contemporary Authors, Gale Reference Team (digital)

Interview with Aileen Fisher, Copeland, Jeffrey Scott, Speaking of Poets: Interviews with Poets who Write for Children and Young Adults, vol. 1, National Council of Teachers of English, 1993

Listen to A. Fisher interview at http://www.boulderlibrary.org/oralhistory/, Retrieved 4/22/2012.
