= Two Hundred Rabbits =

1968 children's book by Lonzo Anderson

- Author: Lonzo Anderson
- Illustrator: Adrienne Adams
- Cover artist: Adrienne Adams
- Language: English
- Genre: Children's literature
- Publisher: Viking (U.S.); Macmillan (Canada)
- Publication date: 1968
- Publication place: United States
- Media type: Print
- Pages: 32
- OCLC: 305341

Two Hundred Rabbits is a 1968 children's picture book written by Lonzo Anderson and illustrated by Adrienne Adams, about a medieval boy who summons forest rabbits with a special whistle. Published by Viking Press in the United States, it received critical acclaim.

== Synopsis ==
In the land of Jamais (inspired by medieval France), a young boy wants to participate in his village's annual festival, but must find a special way to entertain the king to do so. After an old lady recommends he make a "slippery-elm slide whistle", the boy summons a group of 199 rabbits from the nearby forest with it. All of them—along with a traveler who has been following the boy all along—march to the king's castle to delight him; of the 200 in front of him, the traveler is revealed to be the narrator of the story.

== Development ==
The premise of Two Hundred Rabbits was based on a dream that author Lonzo Anderson had after reading a French folk tale. "My wife [Adrienne Adams] loves the story," he told The Courier-News in March 1968, "but while illustrating it, she rather plaintively wished it had fewer characters." Anderson's childhood experiences during the turn of the 20th century would anticipate the creation of the book; he stated in 1972 that, owing to the time he spent unsupervised outdoors, "I grew up rather like a rabbit, barefoot, with the freedom to wander far and wide and learn about nature by being up to my chin in it."

== Themes ==
The tune the boy uses to summon the rabbits "is reminiscent of the music played by the Pied Piper. But this story has a different twist." The twist at the end of the tale was also noted in a 1976 issue of the Language Arts journal: "It is told in the first person, but you are not sure until the final page who is telling the story." As The New York Times noted eight years earlier, "[this is] probably the only fairy tale in existence told from a rabbit's eye view."

== Release ==
Two Hundred Rabbits was published in early 1968 by Viking in the United States, and by Macmillan in Canada. During its original release (which coincided with Easter), Adams' illustrations were exhibited at the FAO Schwarz toy store in New York City. As of 2023, the original publication elements are held among Anderson's papers in the Children's Literature Research Collections of the University of Minnesota Libraries, and those of Adams in the de Grummond Collection of the University of Southern Mississippi.

== Reception ==
Two Hundred Rabbits received critical acclaim on its original print run. Its artwork was praised by Marc Drogin of Munster, Indiana's The Times; Margaret H. Cone in a 1969 issue of Young Children; and the staff of Time magazine. The Bulletin of the Center for Children's Books gave it an "R" ("Recommended") grade, declaring that "The writing style is brisk and unassuming; the illustrations are delightful in their depiction of the colorful scenes of fifteenth-century [settings]." As Drogin opened his review, "Little kids should have a fine time with this, and you won't even mind reading it to them." Time called it "first-rate", while Harriette Behringer of Chicago's Star newspapers wrote, "[Anderson and Adams] have written a delightful book...[which] has a special kind of charm for kindergarten and primary children." For Regina, Saskatchewan's The Leader-Post, Kathleen Graham said, "The entertaining story and full-page colored illustrations combine to make this little story a distinctive one."

Two Hundred Rabbits was also a selection of the Junior Literary Guild, as well as an ALA Notable Book. Adams also considered it one of her favorite projects as an illustrator.
