= Fred Kida =

American cartoonist

- Fred Kida, late in life
- Born: December 12, 1920 Brooklyn, New York City
- Died: April 3, 2014 (aged 93)
- Areas: Penciller, Inker
- Pseudonyms: Kid, KID
- Notable works: Airboy

Fred Kida (December 12, 1920 – April 3, 2014) was a Japanese-American comic book and comic strip artist best known for the 1940s aviator hero Airboy and his antagonist and sometime ally Valkyrie during the period fans and historians call the Golden Age of Comic Books. He went on to draw for Marvel Comics' 1950s iteration, Atlas Comics, in a variety of genres and styles, and then again for Marvel superhero titles in the 1970s. He drew the company's The Amazing Spider-Man newspaper comic strip during the early to mid-1980s. Kida also assisted artist Dan Barry on the long-running strip Flash Gordon from 1958 to 1961 and then again from 1968 to 1971.

== Biography ==
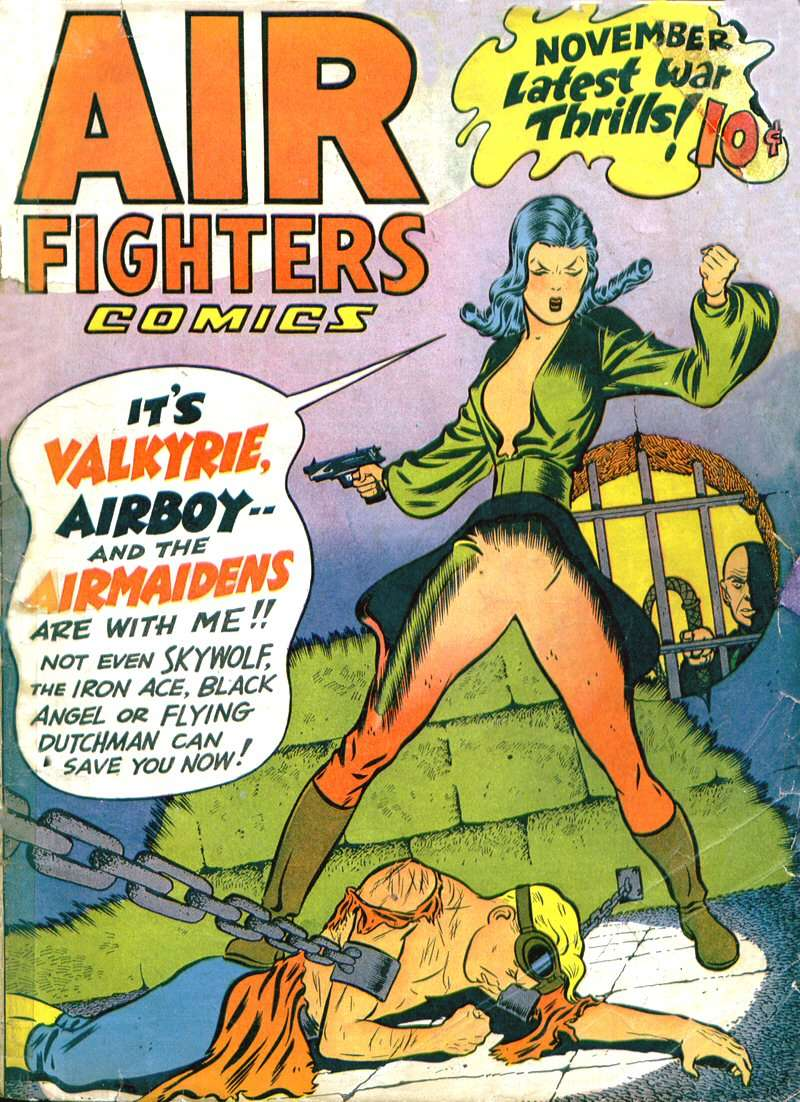
Air Fighters Comics vol. 2, #2 (Nov. 1943): A typically cleavage-baring Valykrie provides the "latest war thrills". Cover art by Kida

=== Early life and career ===
Born on December 12, 1920, in Brooklyn and raised in Manhattan, New York City, Kida attended the city's American School of Design, where Bill Fraccio and Bob Fujitani were classmates. Like many young artists in the 1930s to 1940s Golden Age of Comic Books, he then broke into the field at the Jerry Iger Studio, formerly Eisner & Iger, one of the earliest "packagers" that produced outsourced comic book content for publishers entering the new medium. Starting as an inker and background artist in 1941, Kida moved on to a staff position at Iger client Quality Comics. There he both penciled and inked his first known credited work, the feature "Phantom Clipper" in Military Comics #9 (April 1942).

=== Airboy and afterward ===
In 1942, he joined Hillman Periodicals, where he drew such features as "Iron Ace" (from its premiere in Air Fighters Comics #2, Nov. 1942), "Boy King" and "Gunmaster", and the following year began work on his most prominent Golden Age character, Airboy. That aviation hero, created by writer Charles Biro with scripter Dick Wood and artist Al Camy, appeared initially in Air Fighters Comics, later renamed Airboy Comics. Aside from Airboy himself, the feature was known for the sexy antagonist Valkyrie, a cleavage-baring Axis aviatrix who soon defected and became his ally.

Atlas Comics' Willie the Wiseguy #1 (Sept. 1957): Cover artist Kida in a cartoony vein.

Kida remained on the feature through 1948, afterward working with writer Biro on such Hillman crime comics as the seminal Crime Does Not Pay. From 1949 to 1951, he drew Western, crime and romance comics for Lev Gleason Publications, signing some stories Kid or KID. In 1952, he left to freelance for Atlas Comics, the 1950s forerunner of Marvel Comics. There he worked on characters including the Western gunslingers the Ringo Kid and the Two-Gun Kid and the medieval hero the Black Knight, plus humor, horror, war and Bible stories.

Kida returned to Marvel in the 1970s, primarily as an inker, working on such characters as Iron Man, Godzilla, Ka-Zar, Luke Cage and Man-Wolf, plus Captain Britain for Marvel UK. His final known full comic-book credit is the superhero-team title The Defenders #72 (June 1979) — featuring Marvel's unrelated character Valkyrie. His last known published comic-book work was artwork for the two-page text feature "Re-Educating Valkyrie" in Eclipse Comics's Valkyrie! #1 (May 1987), one of that publisher's revamped Airboy comics, and penciling the character entry for the Grand Director in Marvel's The Official Handbook of the Marvel Universe #17 (Aug. 1987).

=== Comic strips ===
In addition to his comic-book work, Kida in 1941 was one of writer-artist Will Eisner's assistants on the newspaper Sunday-supplement comic-book The Spirit; and from 1946-47 assisted Fujitani (also known as "Bob Wells") on the comic strip Judge Wright. He also briefly assisted Milton Caniff on the strip Steve Canyon.

Most prominently, Kida assisted artist Dan Barry on the long-running strip Flash Gordon from 1958 to 1961 and then again from 1968 to 1971, and under his own byline drew the comic strip The Amazing Spider-Man from August 1981 to July 1986, returning to do the Sunday editions from September 1996 to July 1997.

== Personal life ==
Kida married Elly Ahnert on October 5, 1946, and they had two children, Paul and Peter. An elder in the Port Chester Congregation of Jehovah's Witnesses, he died on April 3, 2014.

== Reprints include ==
- Fred Kida's Valkyrie! (Ken Pierce, Inc., 1982)

Black-and-white reprints of selected stories from Air Fighters Comics vol. 2, #2 & 7; and Airboy Comics vol. 2, #12, and vol. 3, #6 & 12. Introduction by Alex Toth.
