= Bill Fraccio =

American comic book artist

- Born: William Fraccio; July 9, 1920
- Died: October 24, 2005 (aged 85) Mount Vernon, New York, U.S.
- Area: Penciller
- Pseudonyms: Tony Williamson; Tony Williamsune
- Notable works: Charlton Comics

William Fraccio (July 9, 1920 – October 24, 2005) was an American comic book artist whose career stretched from the 1940s Golden Age of comic books through 1979, when he turned to producing advertising art and teaching. He is best known for his 23-year run at Charlton Comics, where he illustrated, among many other things, the first two professional stories of future Marvel Comics editor-in-chief Roy Thomas.

The often-uncredited Fraccio and his frequent art partner, inker Tony Tallarico, sometimes used the joint pseudonym Tony Williamson and, later, Tony Williamsune, on stories for Warren Publishing's horror-comics magazines Creepy, Eerie and Vampirella.

== Biography ==
=== Early life and career ===
Bill Fraccio attended New York City's American School of Design, where classmate Fred Kida introduced him to comic-book art. A lack of published credits in many early comics generally, and by Fraccio in particular, makes credit-confirmation difficult, but Fraccio's reported professional debut was inking a 1940s "Iron Ace" story by another fellow student, Bob Fujitani, in a Hillman Periodicals comic. Fraccio also reportedly contributed to DS Publishing titles including Exposed and Gangsters Can't Win; to the Fawcett Comics feature "Commando Yank" in America's Greatest Comics; and to backup features in Lev Gleason Publications' Daredevil Comics.

He confirmably contributed to EC Comics titles, including The Crypt of Terror No. 17 (May 1950); to Youthful Magazines, including Captain Science No. 5 (Aug. 1951); and to Trojan Comics, including Attack! #6–7 (March–May 1953) and Crime Smashers No. 15 (March 1953). Fraccio then began beginning his long association with Charlton, starting with the premiere issue (#22, March 1956) of writer Jerry Siegel's Mr. Muscles, about a wrestler who gains super strength and fights crime. The series had taken over the numbering of a defunct comic, Blue Beetle — which, coincidentally, Fraccio would draw for several issues upon that superhero series' revival in 1964.

=== Charlton years ===
Fraccio provided art in the variety of genres for the low-budget Derby, Connecticut-based Charlton Comics through the late-1950s and 1960s Silver Age of comic books and beyond.

Though often uncredited, Fraccio penciled hundreds of stories for, confirmably, such Western comics as Black Fury, Cheyenne Kid, Cowboy Western, Gunmaster, and Six-Gun Heroes; such hot rod and motorcycle comics as Surf N' Wheels and World of Wheels; and such superhero comics as Son of Vulcan — including Roy Thomas' first professional story, "The Second Trojan War", in the second issue of that series, No. 50 (Jan. 1966) — and Blue Beetle — including Thomas' second pro story, "The Eye of Horus", in the fifth issue of that series, No. 54 (March 1966). Fraccio's last recorded Charlton work was two backup stories in Surf N' Wheels vol. 2, No. 5 (July 1979) — a more than two-decade run.

=== Later life and career ===
Fraccio was a resident of Mount Vernon, New York, at the time of his death.

== Critical analysis ==
Historian Jim Amash wrote that Fraccio "was never a fan favorite, but his work sure ended up in a lot of comic book collections. He knew he was not a great artist.... He did the best he could for the money he was paid, in the time he had to get that work done. That's all the companies ever asked of him, and he wasn't the type to rock any boats."
