= Crosby Bonsall =

American writer

Crosby Newell Bonsall
- Born: January 2, 1921; Queens, New York
- Died: January 10, 1995 (aged 74); Boston, Massachusetts
- Known for: illustration

Crosby Newell Bonsall (January 2, 1921 – January 10, 1995) was an American artist and children's book author and illustrator. She wrote and illustrated more than 40 children's books.

Born January 2, 1921, in Kew Gardens, Queens, New York, Bonsall studied at New York University School of Architecture and the American School of Design. She had a passion for designing even as a young child. Her children's literature career started as a doodle of an orange-haired, freckle-faced rag doll on her drawing board at the advertising agency she was working for at the time. A doll manufacturer bought the rights to that doll caricature, from which Bonsall later created a family of dolls that became characters in her first book, Tell Me Some More. Illustrated by Fritz Siebel, the book was published in 1961 as part of Harper & Row's "I Can Read" children's series. As a writer, Bonsall supplied the text to six of photographer Ylla's children's books, including award-winning 1964 I'll Show You Cats.

Bonsall's books also include The Case of the Hungry Stranger, The Case of the Cat's Meow, The Case of the Dumb Bells, The Case of the Scaredy Cats, The Day I Had to Play With My Sister, And I Mean It Stanley, Piggle, What Spot? and the illustrations for Joan Nodset's Go Away, Dog.

A spokesperson for HarperCollins described her as follows: "Ms. Bonsall's deceptively simple style conceals a wealth of artistry, skillful characterization, suspense and humor rarely found in children's books—the drawings, as delightful as the text, are an extra dividend."

Bonsall died January 10, 1995, of a stroke at Massachusetts General Hospital in Boston, Massachusetts, where she was living at the time, according to her niece, Barbara Phillips.
