= The Story of Holly and Ivy =

1958 children's book written by Rumer Godden

- First US edition (publ. Viking Press)
- Author: Rumer Godden
- Illustrator: Adrienne Adams (first publication); Barbara Cooney; Sheila Bewley (Puffin edition)
- Language: English
- Subject: Christmas
- Genre: Children's fiction
- Published: 1958
- Media type: Print

The Story of Holly and Ivy is a 1958 children's book written by Rumer Godden. On first publication it was illustrated by Adrienne Adams, but later editions were illustrated by Barbara Cooney; the British Puffin edition is illustrated by Sheila Bewley. The story treats the simultaneous events of wishing for love, in Ivy, a young orphaned girl, and Holly, a Christmas doll.

The story has been adapted into a stage production by the same name and a 1991 animated Christmas television program entitled The Wish That Changed Christmas.

== Synopsis ==
St. Agnes orphanage has closed for Christmas, and all the children except Ivy have been dispatched to various homes for the holiday. Miss Shepherd, the head of the home, cannot take Ivy home with her, so she decides to send her to an infants' orphanage, a train ride away. Ivy suggests that she could instead go to her grandmother in Aylesbury, a surprising inspiration, since she has no grandmother. This inspiration is a primary theme of the story, which begins, "This is a story about wishing."

Ivy is put on a train. She tells travelers she will be visiting her grandmother in Aylesbury. When they respond knowingly to that, she says, "Then...there is an Aylesbury." She gets off there and begins to explore, enjoying the Christmas Eve in the town and looking for her grandmother.

A beautiful new Christmas doll named Holly is standing in the display window of Mr. Blossom's toy store, wishing for a little girl to come and take her home. The toy owl next to her, Abracadabra, treats her with undisguised contempt, and suggests that, since no one will want Holly after the holiday, she will wind up spending the year in the back room with him.

Mrs. Jones, who lives a few blocks from the toy store, suggests to her husband, a police officer that they have a Christmas tree that year. Her husband refuses, saying that it would be a waste of money since they have no children to enjoy it. Despite his words, Mrs. Jones buys a Christmas tree and decorates it.

After a busy afternoon of Christmas sales, Mr. Blossom's toy store finally closes. Neither Holly nor Abracadabra has been sold. Mr. Blossom is tired from a long day's work, so he asks Peter to lock up the store for him, telling him that he can pick a toy for himself as a bonus. Peter locks up the store, but the key slips out of a hole in his pocket without him noticing, landing in the snow outside the shop.

Meanwhile, Ivy's search for her grandmother has not gone well. Feeling very discouraged, she is walking past the toy store when Holly catches her eye. The doll is exactly what she wanted, but she is outside, and the store is locked. She wishes to have the doll, and Holly wishes to have the girl (Ivy). She finds the key that Peter dropped, and decides to keep it. Night falls, and she takes shelter in a nearby alley.

The next morning, she returns to the toy store to look at Holly, and overhears a conversation between Peter and Officer Jones, who has been on patrol all night. Peter is distraught about losing the key to the shop. Ivy realizes that was the key that she found, and returns it. Peter goes in to check the store. Officer Jones quickly realizes that Ivy is on her own, and decides to take her home for breakfast. When Ivy insists that she is going to see her grandmother, Officer Jones decides to let her lead the way to her supposed grandmother's home.

Peter is relieved that the store has not been robbed. Since Ivy saved his job, he decides to use his bonus to select a present for her, and chooses Holly. Abracadabra, furious that Holly's wish is about to come true, hurls himself at Peter and winds up in the trash. When Mr. Blossom goes to retrieve him later, he has mysteriously vanished.

When Ivy sees a house with a beautiful Christmas tree and no children, she claims it is her grandmother's house, which surprises Officer Jones, because it is his own home. When he lets them inside, Mrs. Jones quickly accepts Ivy, and Ivy decides she has found her grandmother. Shortly after, Peter delivers a beautifully wrapped box, which contains Holly. Everyone's wishes have come true: Ivy has a family and a Christmas doll, Holly has a little girl, and Mrs. Jones has a child - she and Officer Jones adopt Ivy.

The story ends with a reflection of "If" imaginings showing how thin are the threads holding together the big elements of the story, and "If I had not wished," concludes Holly.

== Characters ==
Humans

- Ivy – An intrepid six-year-old girl who lives in an orphanage and longs for a family.
- Peter – An older boy who holds a part-time job at a toy store in Appleton.
- Mr. and Mrs. Jones – A middle-aged police officer and his wife who have no children.
- Mr. Blossom – The owner of the toy store where Peter works.
- Miss Shepherd – The head of the orphanage where Ivy lives.
- Mr. Smith – in the TV adaptation, narrator and deus ex machina.

Toys

- Holly – A beautifully dressed Christmas doll who longs for a little girl to belong to.
- Abracadabra – A malevolent stuffed owl with some unusual abilities.
- Mallow & Wallow –two baby hippopotamuses in the toy shop. They are right next to Abracadabra on the shelf and are very afraid of him.
- Crumple – An elephant in the toy shop.
- Other dolls – A bride and two bridesmaids who are next to Holly on the shelf, none of whom are sold during Christmas. The three dolls mention that they can be sold at other times of the year (the yellow primrose bridesmaid is suitable for spring, the pink rose bridesmaid is appropriate for summer, and the orange blossom bride is appropriate for any time a wedding happens).

== Reception ==
The Guardian gave a favorable review for the book, marking it as one of their "perennial favorites". The Horn Book Magazine also rated it highly, as they felt it was "Texturally rich and evocatively wintry" and recommended it as a read for the "whole family". The Boston Parents Paper has named the book one of their "100 Best Children's Books of All Time".

== Television adaptation ==
A television adaptation of the book entitled The Wish That Changed Christmas aired on CBS as part of the Ronald McDonald Family Theater on December 20, 1991. The 30 minute show featured the voice of Jonathan Winters as The Owl, with Brittany Thornton and Lea Floden voicing the characters of Ivy and Holly. The New York Times and Los Angeles Times were both highly critical of the special's script, animation, and of the presence of Ronald McDonald as the show's host, which the Los Angeles Times felt made the show "feel suspiciously like a long, low-key commercial for a certain fast-food chain." The Washington Post was more favorable in their review, but also voiced skepticism over the presence of Ronald McDonald as the special's host. In subsequent years, the television special was slightly modified to be presented with an unnamed and unseen narrator and did not include the presence of Ronald McDonald in any capacity.

== Publication history ==
Beside numerous editions as a short book, The Story of Holly and Ivy has been published in two different collections of doll stories by Rumer Godden:

- Four Dolls (Macmillan Children's Books, 1983)
- The Fairy Doll and Other Tales from The Dolls' House (Macmillan Children's, 2012)
