= Peter Burchard =

American writer

- Born: March 1, 1921 Washington, D.C., US
- Died: July 3, 2004 (aged 83)
- Occupation: Author, free-lance designer, and illustrator
- Education: Philadelphia Museum School of Art (1947)
- Notable works: One Gallant Rush (1965)
- Spouse: Elizabeth Chamberlain (m. 1945): Lucy Edwards; Linda Wemyss Carman
- Children: 2

Peter Burchard (1921 – 2004) was an American author, free-lance designer, and illustrator. He primarily wrote children's books about slavery, abolitionism, and the American Civil War. He wrote 26 books and illustrated over 100. His 1965 book One Gallant Rush was about Colonel Robert Gould Shaw and the 54th Massachusetts Regiment, the first African-American unit in the Union Army. It was adapted for the 1989 film Glory, which won numerous awards.

Burchard was born March 1, 1921, in Washington, D.C. to Russell Duncan and Ethel (née Brokaw) Burchard. During World War II, he served on convoys in the North Atlantic. During this time, his drawings were published by Yank magazine. After the war, Burchard graduated from the Philadelphia Museum School of Art in 1947. He became a Guggenheim Fellow in 1966.

Burchard was married three times. On March 23, 1945, he married his first wife, Elizabeth Chamberlain, with whom he had two children. He later married Lucy Edwards and Linda Wemyss Carman.

Burchard died on July 3, 2004.

== Books ==
=== As author ===
==== Adult ====
- One Gallant Rush: Robert Gould Shaw and His Brave Black Regiment (1965/reprint 1990)

==== Juvenile ====
- The River Queen, Macmillan (New York, NY), 1957.
- The Carol Moran, Macmillan (New York, NY), 1958.
- Balloons: From Paper Bags to Skyhooks, Macmillan (New York, NY), 1960.
- Jed: The Story of a Yankee Soldier and a Southern Boy; Coward, McCann & Geoghegan (New York, NY), 1960.
- North by Night; Coward, McCann & Geoghegan (New York, NY), 1962.
- Stranded: A Story of New York in 1875; Coward, McCann & Geoghegan (New York, NY), 1967.
- Bimby; Coward, McCann & Geoghegan (New York, NY), 1968.
- Chito, illustrated with photographs by Katrina Thomas; Coward, McCann & Geoghegan (New York, NY), 1969.
- Pioneers of Flight: From Early Times to the WrightBrothers, St. Martin's Press (New York, NY), 1970.
- Rat Hell: A Story of Escape; Coward, McCann & Geoghegan (New York, NY), 1971.
- A Quiet Place; Coward, McCann & Geoghegan (New York, NY), 1972.
- The Deserter: A Spy Story of the Civil War; Coward, McCann & Geoghegan (New York, NY), 1973.
- Harbor Tug, Putnam (New York, NY), 1974.
- Whaleboat Raid; Coward, McCann & Geoghegan (New York, NY), 1977.
- Ocean Race: A Sea Venture, Putnam (New York, NY), 1978.
- Chinwe, Putnam (New York, NY), 1979.
- Digger, Putnam (New York, NY), 1980.
- First Affair, Farrar, Straus and Giroux (New York, NY), 1981.
- Sea Change, Farrar, Straus and Giroux (New York, NY), 1984.
- Venturing: An Introduction to Sailing, Little, Brown and Company (Boston, MA), 1986.
- "We'll Stand by the Union": Robert Gould Shaw and the Black 54th Massachusetts Regiment, Facts on File (New York, NY), 1993.
- Charlotte Forten: A Black Teacher in the Civil War , Crown (New York, NY), 1995.
- Lincoln and Slavery, Atheneum (New York, NY), 1999.
- Frederick Douglass: For the Great Family of Man, Atheneum (New York, NY), 2003.

=== As illustrator ===
- Our Town Has a Circus (written by Marie McSwigan), Dutton (New York, NY), 1949.
- The Baby Elephant (written by Franklin Folsom), Wonder Books (New York, NY), 1950.
- The Cats Who Stayed for Dinner (written by Phyllis Rowand), Wonder Books (New York, NY), 1951.
- William Penn (written by Virginia Haviland), Abingdon (Nashville, TN), 1952.
- Show Lamb (written by Hildreth T. Wriston), Abingdon (Nashville, TN), 1953.
- Down the Mississippi (written by Clyde Robert Bulla), Crowell (New York, NY), 1954.
- CourageWins (written by Grace Tracy Johnson and Harold N. Johnson), Dutton (New York, NY), 1954.
- Squanto: Friend of the WhiteMan (written by Clyde Robert Bulla), Crowell (New York, NY), 1954, published as Squanto: Friend of the Pilgrims, 1969.
- Tiny Man (written by Margaret Glover Otto),, Holt (New York, NY), 1955.
- Treasure of Watchdog Mountain (written by Alf Evers), Macmillan (New York, NY), 1955.
- Clan Texas (written by Marian Cumming), Harcourt (New York, NY), 1955.
- The Boy WhoGot Mailed (written by William L. Brown and Rosalie Moore); Coward, McCann & Geoghegan (New York, NY), 1957.
- Rifles for Watie (written by Harold Keith), Crowell (New York, NY), 1957.
- Pirate's Promise (written by Clyde Robert Bulla), Crowell (New York, NY), 1958.
- The Fourth of July Raid (written by Wilma Pitchford Hays; Coward, McCann & Geoghegan (New York, NY), 1959.
- Easter Fires (written by Wilma Pitchford Hays); Coward, McCann & Geoghegan (New York, NY), 1960.
- Roosevelt Grady (written by Louisa R. Shotwell), World Publishing (New York, NY), 1963.
- Pirate Chase (written by Earl S. Miers), Holt (New York, NY), 1965.
- The Street of Flower Boxes (written by Peggy Mann); Coward, McCann & Geoghegan (New York, NY), 1966.
- Zeb (written by Lonzo Anderson), Knopf (New York, NY), 1966.
- Pocahontas and the Strangers (written by Clyde Robert Bulla), Crowell (New York, NY), 1971.
- Ride 'Em Cowgirl (written by Lynn Haney), Putnam (New York, NY), 1975.
- Night Spell (written by Robert Newman), Atheneum (New York, NY), 1977.
