= One Gallant Rush =

1965 book by Peter Burchard

- Author: Peter Burchard
- Language: English
- Subject: 54th Massachusetts Regiment
- Genre: Non-fiction
- Publisher: St. Martin's Press
- Publication date: June 11, 1965
- Publication place: United States

One Gallant Rush: Robert Gould Shaw and His Brave Black Regiment (1965) is a book by American writer Peter Burchard, based on letters written by Robert Gould Shaw, white colonel of the first black regiment in the Union Army during the American Civil War, the 54th Massachusetts Regiment. They were the first of what became the United States Colored Troops. Nearly 200,000 African Americans fought in the war.

The book's title comes from a quote from Frederick Douglass, speaking about freedom for enslaved African Americans: "The iron gate of our prison stands half open; one gallant rush will fling it wide."

One Gallant Rush was adapted for the film Glory, released in 1989 and starring Matthew Broderick, Denzel Washington and Morgan Freeman. The book was re-issued in 1990 as a tie-in to the movie.
