= Mr. Muscles =

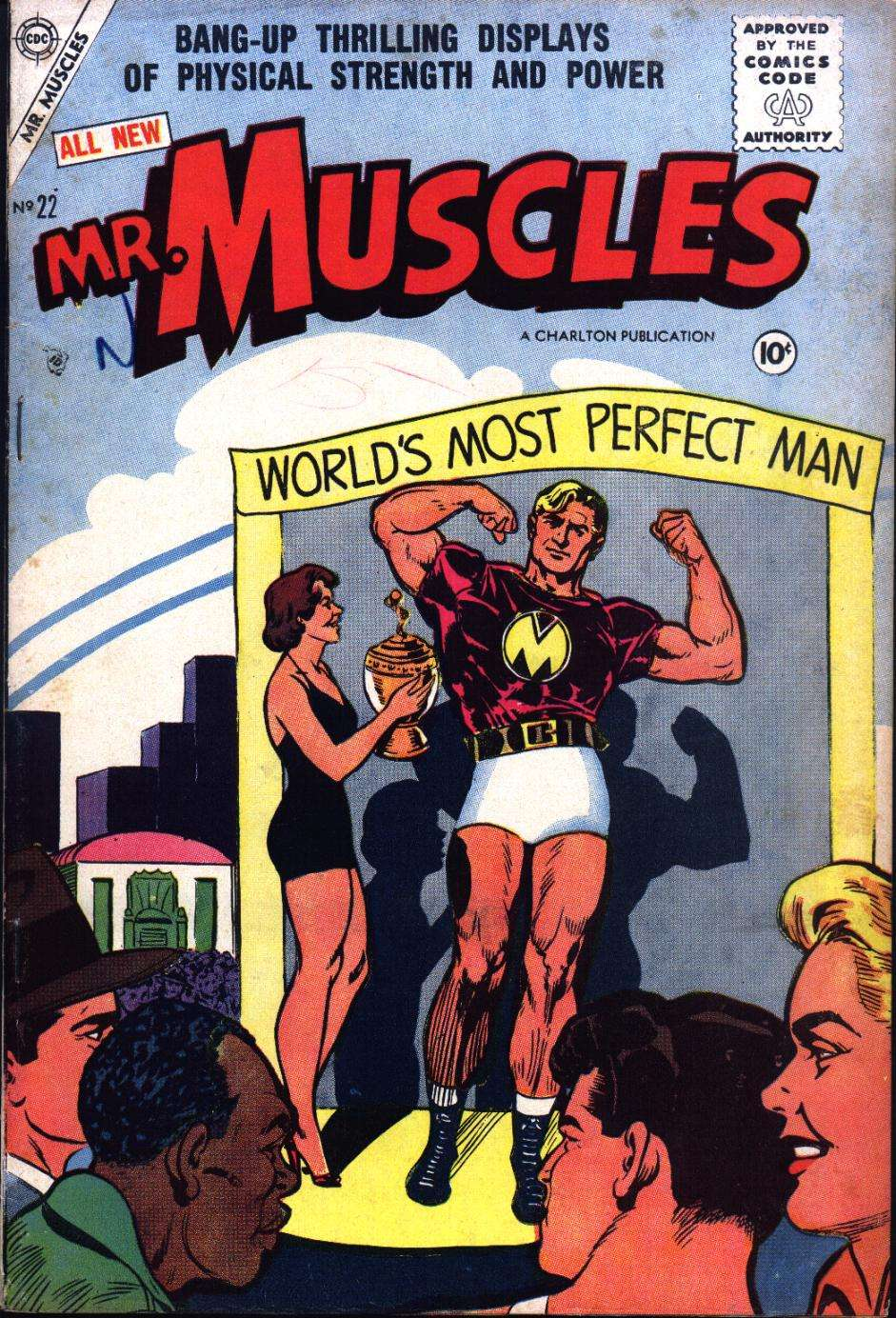
- Cover of Mr. Muscles #22 (March 1956)), art by Dick Giordano.

Publication information
- Publisher: Charlton Comics
- First appearance: Mr. Muscles #22 (March 1956)
- Created by: Jerry Siegel

In-story information
- Alter ego: Brett Carson
- Team affiliations: Brandon Tyler
- Abilities: Superhuman strength

Mr. Muscles is a comic book superhero created in 1956 by writer Jerry Siegel for Charlton Comics, and drawn by Bill Fraccio for the first of two issues of his namesake comic, and by the team of penciler Charles Nicholas and inker Vince Alascia for the second. A young Dick Giordano provided the premiere issue's cover. Siegel, who co-created Superman, wrote both issues featuring Charlton's own muscleman.

== Fictional character biography ==
Wrestler Brett Carson obtained super strength in the process of fighting the paralysis of polio (and refusing to accept the doctors' prognosis of permanent paralysis) and used it to fight crime. He was assisted by sidekicks Kid Muscles and Miss Muscles, who appeared in backup stories. With a superhero costume consisting of red-and-black wrestling tights with a yellow "M" insignia, Carson is one of few who did not wear a mask and whose identity is publicly known. An additional character, Steeplejack, starred in a backup feature in the second issue.

The comic book Mr. Muscles ran two issues numbered #22–23 (March and August 1956), the series having taken over the numbering of the comic Blue Beetle. The sole other known appearance of a character by this name was alongside other guests in writer-artist Steve Ditko's Creeper backup story, "Beware Mr. Wrinkles", in DC Comics' World's Finest Comics #254 (Jan. 1979).
