= Houses from the Sea =

1960 Caldecott picture book

- Author: Alice E. Goudey
- Illustrator: Adrienne Adams
- Publisher: Charles Scribner
- Publication date: 1959
- Pages: unpaged
- Awards: Caldecott Honor

Houses from the Sea is a 1959 picture book written by Alice E. Goudey and illustrated by Adrienne Adams. The book is about two children who collect seashells. The book was a recipient of a 1960 Caldecott Honor for its illustrations.

Houses from the Sea includes pastel pictures of 15 types of shells found on the east, west and gulf coasts of the United States. A review in The New York Times described the book as "not a manual but rather a very persuasive invitation to try one's own luck".
