= Fay B. Kaigler Children's Book Festival =

Coordinates: 31.328278°N 89.332712°W

The Fay B. Kaigler Children's Book Festival is an annual book festival that was founded in 1968 and is sponsored by The University of Southern Mississippi.

== History ==
=== Early years ===
In 1968, Dr. Warren Tracy, chairman of the Library Science Department and university librarian for The University of Southern Mississippi, saw his vision for a children’s literature conference come to life. The university, under the leadership of Dr. William D. McCain, and the Library Science department hosted the Conference on the Writing, Illustrating, and Publishing of Children's Books, the first of what soon became the annual Children's Book Festival.

Two years earlier, Dr. Lena de Grummond, professor of Library Science, with Dr. Tracy’s blessing, had begun to procure early children's books to support the Library Science program. She spent countless hours writing to authors and illustrators of contemporary children’s books to acquire original material for the library. Contributions of artwork and manuscripts flowed in from across the United States and Canada. Today, more than 1200 authors and illustrators are represented in the de Grummond Children's Literature Collection.

In his original vision for a children's literature conference, Dr. Tracy saw the conference as a way to highlight the de Grummond Collection. That first conference in May 1968 was designed to announce the opening of the special children's literature collection. Librarians, teachers, parents, and other adults interested in promoting children's literature were invited for three days of exhibits, workshops, and panel discussions led by publishers and editors of children's books. Dr. Francis Lander Spain, past president of the American Library Association and former head of the children's department of the New York Public Library, spoke at the first evening session, which was open to the public.

In 1969, the conference became known as the Children's Book Festival and included an event that became an honored tradition – presentation of The University of Southern Mississippi Medallion, an award for distinguished service in the field of children’s literature. A committee of professionals associated with children’s literature selects the recipient each year. Unique among literary prizes, the medallion is awarded for an individual's total body of work, rather than for one particular work, and each medallion is different. Cast in silver for the recipient and for permanent display in the de Grummond Collection, in bronze for sale to the public, a profile of the honoree is engraved on the face, or obverse, of the medallion, and an illustration from the honoree's work is engraved on the reverse side. Since the first award to author Lois Lenski at the Second Annual Children’s Book Festival, the Southern Miss Medallion has been presented to an outstanding array of children’s authors and illustrators.

=== 1970s–1980s ===
From 1977 to 1980, Dr. Onva K. Boshears served as director of the festival. Dr. Jeannine Laughlin-Porter assumed the directorship in 1980. That was the year Ezra Jack Keats, internationally acclaimed author and illustrator for children, was invited to accept the Southern Miss Medallion. Following his visit, Keats became one of the strongest supporters of the Children's Book Festival and the de Grummond Collection. Since his death, the university has acquired his personal and professional papers, original artwork, typescripts, and dummies and preliminary sketches for 36 of his books. The materials are now housed in the de Grummond Collection. In 1985, the Keats Foundation established an Ezra Jack Keats lectureship, with Barbara Cooney as the artist honoree and Brian Alderson as the first Keats lecturer. Children's Authors Speak, a collection of speeches compiled by Dr. Laughlin-Porter and Sherry Laughlin, was published in 1993 and includes a number of Keats lectures, as well as speeches by Southern Miss Medallion honorees.

=== 1990s–present ===
Dr. Boshears, during Dr. Laughlin-Porter's directorship of the festival, continued to work closely with her and chaired the Medallion Selection Committee through spring 1993. In 1994, he resumed directorship of the festival and continued as director until his retirement in 2001. Dr. Rosemary Chance, an assistant professor in the School of Library and Information Science, became the director of the festival in 2002. Upon Dr. Chance's retirement in 2004, Dr. Catharine Bomhold became the director of the Fay B. Kaigler Children’s Book Festival.

In 1998, Miss Fay B. Kaigler, a retired elementary school teacher and native Mississippian, funded the first Kaigler–Lamont Award to be given for distinguished service to children by a librarian or teacher. On December 5, 2001, the festival was renamed in honor of Miss Kaigler, who contributed a planned gift to the festival.

== The University of Southern Mississippi Medallion ==
The University of Southern Mississippi Medallion, sometimes promoted as the Southern Miss Medallion, annually recognizes one person for "outstanding contributions in the field of children's literature". It was inaugurated at the second annual Festival in 1969.

"Silver medallions are cast for the recipient, for the president of The University of Southern Mississippi, for members of the medallion selection committee, and for the de Grummond Children's Literature Collection's permanent display. In addition, bronze medallions are cast and are available for purchase during the festival." —2010 Program

=== Recipients ===
The Medallion is a lifetime achievement award that will be conferred for the 47th time at the annual conference in April 2015.

1969 Lois Lenski

1970 Ernest H. Shepard

1971 Roger Duvoisin

1972 Marcia Brown

1973 Lynd Ward

1974 Taro Yashima

1975 Barbara Cooney

1976 Scott O’Dell

1977 Adrienne Adams

1978 Madeleine L’Engle

1979 Leonard Everett Fisher

1980 Ezra Jack Keats

1981 Maurice Sendak

1982 Beverly Cleary

1983 Katherine Paterson

1984 Peter Spier

1985 Arnold Lobel

1986 Jean Craighead George

1987 Paula Fox

1988 Jean Fritz

1989 Lee Bennett Hopkins

1990 Charlotte Zolotow

1991 Richard Peck

1992 James Marshall

1993 Quentin Blake

1994 Ashley Bryan

1995 Tomie de Paola

1996 Patricia MacLachlan

1997 Eric Carle

1998 Elaine Konigsburg

1999 Russell Freedman

2000 David Macaulay

2001 Virginia Hamilton

2002 Rosemary Wells

2003 Lois Lowry

2004 Jerry Pinkney

2005 Kevin Henkes

2006 Walter Dean Myers

2007 Eve Bunting

2008 Pat Mora

2009 Judy Blume

2010 David Wiesner

2011 T.A. Barron

2012 Jane Yolen

2013 Jon Scieszka

2014 Christopher Paul Curtis

2015 Paul O. Zelinsky

2016 Jacqueline Woodson

2017 Kate DiCamillo

2018 Dav Pilkey

2019 Tamora Pierce

2020 Rita Williams-Garcia

2021 Andrea Davis Pinkney

2022 Brian Selznick

2023 Gene Luen Yang
