= Glory (1989 film) =

1989 film directed by Edward Zwick

- Theatrical release poster
- Directed by: Edward Zwick
- Screenplay by: Kevin Jarre
- Based on: Lay This Laurel by Lincoln Kirstein; One Gallant Rush by Peter Burchard
- Produced by: Freddie Fields
- Starring: Matthew Broderick; Denzel Washington; Cary Elwes; Morgan Freeman
- Cinematography: Freddie Francis
- Edited by: Steven Rosenblum
- Music by: James Horner
- Production company: Freddie Fields Productions
- Distributed by: Tri-Star Pictures
- Release date: December 15, 1989 (United States)
- Running time: 122 minutes
- Country: United States
- Language: English
- Budget: $18 million
- Box office: $27 million

Glory is a 1989 American epic historical war drama film directed by Edward Zwick about the 54th Massachusetts Infantry Regiment, one of the Union Army's earliest African American regiments in the American Civil War. It stars Matthew Broderick as Colonel Robert Gould Shaw, the regiment's commanding officer and Denzel Washington, Cary Elwes, and Morgan Freeman as fictional members of the 54th. The screenplay by Kevin Jarre was based on the books Lay This Laurel (1973) by Lincoln Kirstein and One Gallant Rush (1965) by Peter Burchard and the personal letters of Shaw. The film depicts the soldiers of the 54th from the formation of their regiment to their heroic actions at the Second Battle of Fort Wagner.

Glory was produced by Freddie Fields Productions and distributed by Tri-Star Pictures in the United States. It premiered in limited release in the United States on December 15, 1989, and in wide release on February 16, 1990, grossing $27 million worldwide on an $18 million budget. The film was nominated for five Academy Awards and won three, with Washington winning Best Supporting Actor in addition to receiving the corresponding Golden Globe, while Freddie Francis was nominated for the BAFTA Award for Best Cinematography. The film won awards from the Kansas City Film Critics Circle, the Political Film Society, and the NAACP Image Awards.

In 2025, it was selected for preservation in the United States National Film Registry by the Library of Congress as being "culturally, historically or aesthetically significant."

== Plot ==
During the American Civil War, Captain Robert Gould Shaw is wounded at Antietam and returns home to Boston on medical leave. Through his father's political influence, he is promoted to Colonel and given command of the 54th Regiment Massachusetts Volunteer Infantry, one of the first black regiments in the Union Army. Shaw's friends Cabot Forbes and Charlie Morse are commissioned as officers, and Thomas Searles, a freeborn African-American man whom Shaw thinks of as a brother, is their first volunteer. Other recruits include John Rawlins, Jupiter Sharts, Trip, and a mute boy drummer.

After the Emancipation Proclamation, the men of the 54th are told the Confederacy will execute any black soldiers captured in Union uniform along with their white officers. Despite this threat, the 54th's recruits turn down an offer to be honorably discharged and undergo rigorous training under Sergeant-Major Mulcahy.

Trip is arrested while AWOL. After having him flogged, Shaw learns Trip left camp to replace his worn out shoes. Shaw confronts the base's racist quartermaster, who is holding back their supplies. When the men realize the Federal government pays black soldiers about three-quarters the salary of white soldiers, Trip encourages the men to refuse their pay. Shaw and his officers tear up their pay vouchers in solidarity. In recognition of his mentorship of the younger soldiers, and his advice to Shaw regarding the thoughts and morale of the men, Rawlins is promoted to Sergeant-Major.

Once trained, the 54th comes under the command of General Charles Harker and is ordered by Colonel James Montgomery to sack and burn Darien, Georgia. Shaw initially refuses but agrees under threat of being relieved and his regiment being placed under the racist Montgomery’s command. After weeks of his men being assigned to backbreaking manual labor, a frustrated Shaw resorts to blackmailing Montgomery with a threat to report him and Harker for profiteering unless they get to fight.

The regiment goes into battle at James Island, South Carolina and repels a Confederate attack. Thomas is wounded in the action but saves Trip's life, earning a promotion to Corporal. Shaw offers Trip the honor of bearing the regimental flag in battle. He declines, not believing the war will result in a better life for slaves.

General George Crockett Strong informs his regimental commanders of a major campaign to secure a foothold at Charleston Harbor and describes the initial attack at Morris Island which requires a frontal assault on Fort Wagner, whose only landward approach is a strip of open beach. Shaw volunteers the 54th. The night before the battle, the black soldiers conduct a religious service, give thanks and seek God's help. The next morning the 54th deploys for the assault to the cheers of white Union troops who had scorned them earlier.

The 54th suffers heavy losses in a daytime assault and takes cover in the dunes until sundown. Attempting to rally his stalled men, Shaw is killed. Trip lifts the flag, brandishing it until he is mortally wounded. Forbes assumes command and leads the 54th in a brutal hand-to-hand fight, during which Morse is killed. Forbes, Rawlins, Thomas, and Jupiter run into Confederate batteries being pointed at them and the screen fades to black, implying their deaths.

After sun up the next day, Confederate soldiers remove the bodies of Union soldiers from the beach, raise the Confederate flag over the fort, and bury the corpses in a mass grave. Shaw's body slides into the excavation and comes to rest next to Trip's.

An epilogue reveals that although Fort Wagner was never captured, the courage displayed by the 54th led to the Union Army accepting thousands of Black men for combat. President Abraham Lincoln credited the move with helping to turn the tide of the war.

== Cast ==
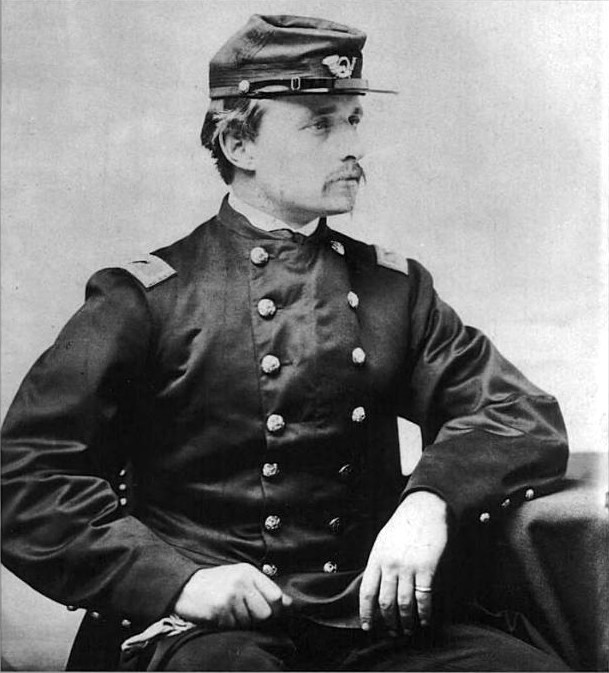
Colonel Robert Gould Shaw in May 1863

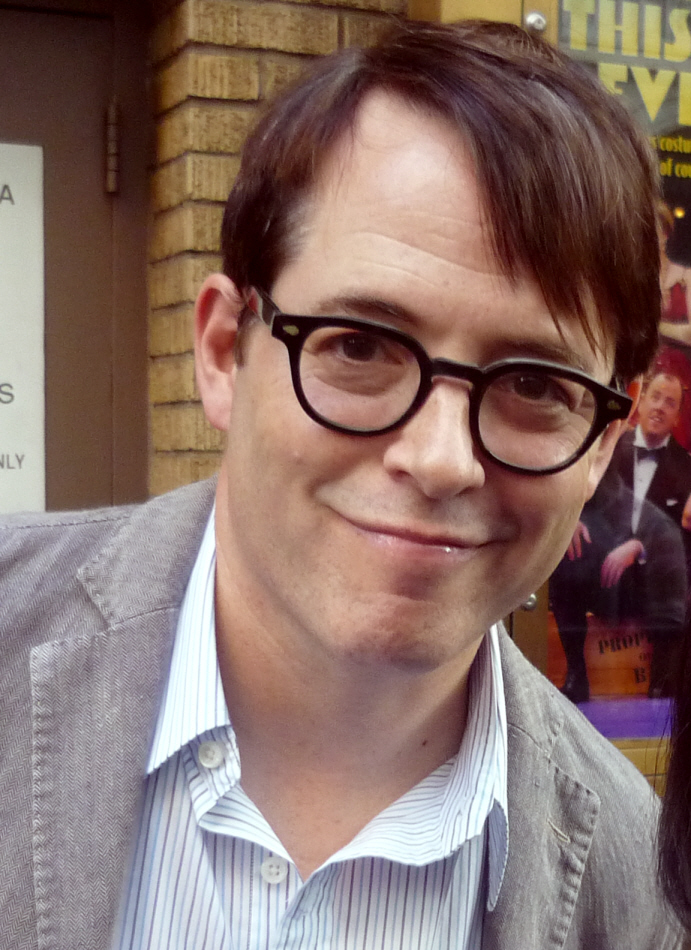
Matthew Broderick portrays Shaw in Glory.

- Matthew Broderick as Colonel Robert Gould Shaw
- Denzel Washington as Private Trip
- Cary Elwes as Major Cabot Forbes
- Morgan Freeman as Sergeant Major John Rawlins
- Andre Braugher as Corporal Thomas Searles
- Jihmi Kennedy as Private Jupiter Sharts
- Cliff DeYoung as Colonel James Montgomery
- Alan North as Governor John Albion Andrew
- John Finn as Sergeant Major Mulcahy
- Mark Margolis as 10th Connecticut Soldier
- RonReaco Lee as Mute Drummer Boy
- Donovan Leitch as Captain Charles Fessenden Morse
- Bob Gunton as General Charles Garrison Harker
- Jay O. Sanders as General George Crockett Strong
- Raymond St. Jacques as Frederick Douglass (uncredited)
- Richard Riehle as Quartermaster
- JD Cullum as Henry Sturgis Russell
- Christian Baskous as Edward L. Pierce
- Peter Michael Goetz as Francis Shaw
- Jane Alexander as Sarah Blake Sturgis Shaw (uncredited)

== Production ==
=== Development and script ===
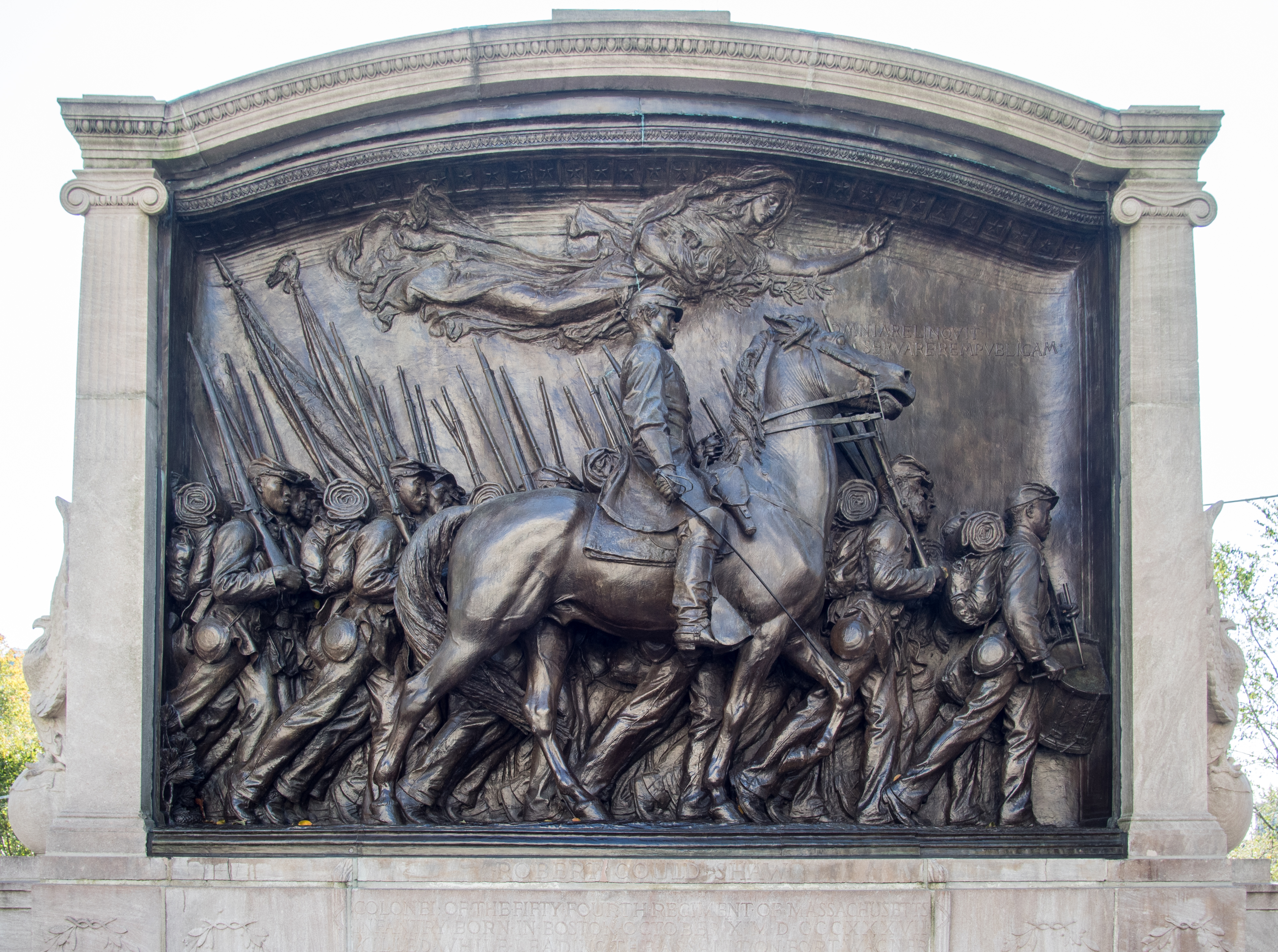
The Robert Gould Shaw Memorial at Boston Common by Augustus Saint-Gaudens

The title of the film recalls the "glory" for which the July 28, 1863, edition of the weekly Columbus Enquirer reported that First-Sergeant Robert John Simmons, mortally wounded at Battery Wagner, came to fight (Simmons himself wrote, in an account of the Battle of Grimball's Landing that was published in the New York Tribune on December 23, 1863: "God has protected me through this, my first fiery, leaden trial, and I do give Him the glory").

Lincoln Kirstein had first approached Lloyd Fonvielle to write the script. Fonvielle was too in awe of Kirstein to collaborate effectively with him and introduced Kirstein to his friend, Kevin Jarre, who had worked on Rambo: First Blood Part II; they were originally going to write the script together, but Fonvielle got tied up in another project, leaving Jarre to write the script on his own.

A Civil War buff since he was a child, Jarre met with Kirstein and talked about the 54th. As Jarre stated: "Lincoln’s interest was deeper. It related to his whole philosophy about surrendering yourself to something bigger, some larger cause. He’d always wanted to make a movie about the 54th".

Jarre's inspiration for writing the film came from viewing the monument to Colonel Shaw and the 54th Massachusetts Volunteer Infantry in Boston Common. His screenplay was based on several sources, including the books Brave Black Regiment - History of the fifty-forth Regiment of Massachusetts Volunteer Infantry (1891) by the 54th's Captain Luis F. Emilio, Lincoln Kirstein's Lay This Laurel (1973), and Peter Burchard's One Gallant Rush (1965), as well as the personal letters of Robert Gould Shaw.

Jarre moved into Room 421 at the Gramercy Park Hotel and worked around the clock, writing the script in a few weeks on spec.

Kirstein showed the script to producer James Ivory of Merchant Ivory Productions. Ivory liked the script but wanted Ruth Prawer Jhabvala to give it a rewrite. According to Fonvielle, Kirstein then got up, shook Ivory’s hand warmly, pulled him to his feet, said, “Jim, thanks so much for coming down,” and ushered him out the front door.

The script was then sent to director Bruce Beresford, who committed to do it and brought in producer Freddie Fields, who then set up a deal at Columbia Pictures, but when David Puttnam left Columbia, pre-production had stopped. Beresford left the project, and Fields then took the script to Tri-Star. The studio agreed to do the film and hired Edward Zwick as director.

=== Filming ===
Exterior filming took place primarily in Massachusetts and Georgia. The culminating battle scene of Fort Wagner was filmed on the beaches of Jekyll Island, Georgia. Opening scenes meant to portray the Battle of Antietam show volunteer military reenactors filmed at a major engagement at the Gettysburg battlefield. The scenes depicting the Battle of Grimball's Landing were filmed at Olustee Battlefield Historic State Park. Later in the war, the 54th Massachusetts did fight at the Battle of Olustee, but it is not depicted in the movie. Zwick did not want to turn Glory "into a black story with a more commercially convenient white hero". Actor Morgan Freeman noted: "We didn't want this film to fall under that shadow. This is a picture about the 54th Regiment, not Colonel Shaw, but at the same time the two are inseparable". Zwick hired the writer Shelby Foote as a technical adviser. Foote later became widely known for his contributions to Ken Burns' PBS nine-episode documentary, The Civil War (1990).

On February 16, 1989, the body of a middle-aged man was discovered on the film's set in Savannah, about a day after his death. Described as having a Middle Eastern appearance, with no apparent signs of suffering a violent death, he was never positively identified.

=== Music ===
Glory's original motion picture soundtrack was released by Virgin Records on January 11, 1990. The score for the film was composed and orchestrated by James Horner in association with the Boys Choir of Harlem. Jim Henrikson edited the film's music, while Shawn Murphy mixed the score.

== Historical sources ==
=== Monograph ===
A nonfiction study of the regiment first appeared in 1965 and was republished in paperback in January 1990 by St. Martin's Press under the title One Gallant Rush: Robert Gould Shaw and His Brave Black Regiment. The book, by Peter Burchard, expands on how the 54th Massachusetts developed as battle-ready soldiers. Summarizing the historical events, the book provides events surrounding the aftermath of the first black Union regiment and how it influenced the outcome of the war.

== Release ==
=== Critical response ===
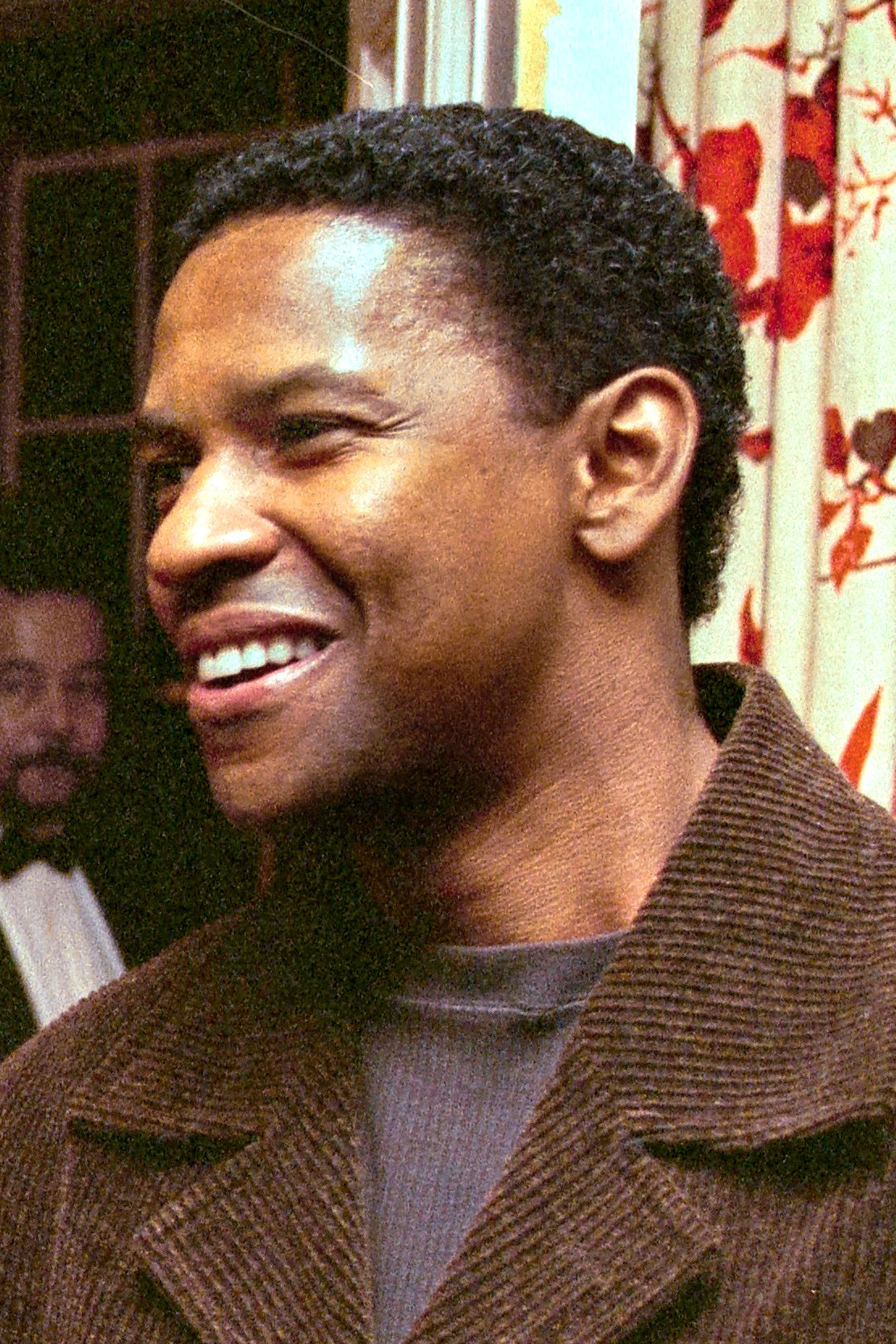
Denzel Washington's performance was widely acclaimed, and he won the Oscar and Golden Globe for Best Supporting Actor.

On Rotten Tomatoes, the film holds an approval rating of 95%, based on 60 reviews, with an average rating of 8/10. The site's consensus states: "Bolstered by exceptional cinematography, powerful storytelling, and an Oscar-winning performance by Denzel Washington, Glory remains one of the finest Civil War movies ever made." On Metacritic, which uses a weighted average, the film holds a score of 78/100, based on 22 critics, indicating "generally favorable" reviews. Audiences polled by CinemaScore gave the film an average grade of "A" on an A+ to F scale.

Film critic Vincent Canby's review in The New York Times stated, "[Broderick] gives his most mature and controlled performance to date ... [Washington is] an actor clearly on his way to a major screen career ... The movie unfolds in a succession of often brilliantly realized vignettes tracing the 54th's organization, training and first experiences below the Mason–Dixon line. The characters' idiosyncrasies emerge". Roger Ebert from the Chicago Sun-Times gave the film three-and-a-half stars out of four, calling it "a strong and valuable film no matter whose eyes it is seen through". He believed the production design credited to Norman Garwood and the cinematography of Freddie Francis paid "enormous attention to period detail".

Watching "Glory," I had one recurring problem. I didn't understand why it had to be told so often from the point of view of the 54th's white commanding officer. Why did we see the black troops through his eyes — instead of seeing him through theirs? To put it another way, why does the top billing in this movie go to a white actor?

— Roger Ebert, writing in the Chicago Sun-Times

Peter Travers of Rolling Stone was not impressed at all with the overall acting, calling Broderick "catastrophically miscast as Shaw". Alternatively, Richard Schickel of Time described the picture by saying, "the movie's often awesome imagery and a bravely soaring choral score by James Horner that transfigure the reality, granting it the status of necessary myth". Desson Howe of The Washington Post, pointed out some flaws that included mentioning Broderick as "an amiable non-presence, creating unintentionally the notion that the 54th earned their stripes despite wimpy leadership".

James Berardinelli writing for ReelViews, called the film "without question, one of the best movies ever made about the American Civil War", noting that it "has important things to say, yet it does so without becoming pedantic". Rating the film four stars, critic Leonard Maltin wrote that it was "grand, moving, breathtakingly filmed (by veteran cinematographer Freddie Francis) and faultlessly performed", calling it "one of the finest historical dramas ever made".

Gene Siskel of the Chicago Tribune gave the film a "thumbs up" review, saying, "like Driving Miss Daisy, this is another admirable film that turns out to be surprisingly entertaining". He thought the film took on "some true social significance" and felt the actors portrayed the characters as "more than simply black men". He explained: "They're so different, that they become not merely standard Hollywood blacks, but true individuals".

American Civil War historian James M. McPherson stated the film "accomplished a remarkable feat in sensitizing a lot of today's black students to the role that their ancestors played in the Civil War in winning their own freedom".

=== Accolades ===
The film was nominated and won several awards in 1989–90. A complete list of awards the film won or was nominated for are listed below.

Award	Category	Nominee	Result
62nd Academy Awards	Best Actor in a Supporting Role	Denzel Washington	Won
62nd Academy Awards	Best Art Direction	Norman Garwood, Garrett Lewis	Nominated
62nd Academy Awards	Best Cinematography	Freddie Francis	Won
62nd Academy Awards	Best Film Editing	Steven Rosenblum	Nominated
62nd Academy Awards	Best Sound	Donald O. Mitchell, Gregg Rudloff, Elliot Tyson, Russell Williams II	Won
41st ACE Eddie Awards	Best Edited Feature Film	————	Won
44th British Academy Film Awards	Best Cinematography	Freddie Francis	Nominated
British Society of Cinematographers Awards 1990	Best Cinematography	Freddie Francis	Won
Casting Society of America Artios Awards 1990	Best Casting for Feature Film, Drama	Mary Colquhoun	Nominated
47th Golden Globe Awards	Best Motion Picture – Drama	Freddie Fields	Nominated
47th Golden Globe Awards	Best Director	Edward Zwick	Nominated
47th Golden Globe Awards	Best Screenplay	Kevin Jarre	Nominated
47th Golden Globe Awards	Best Supporting Actor – Motion Picture	Denzel Washington	Won
47th Golden Globe Awards	Best Original Score	James Horner	Nominated
33rd Grammy Awards	Best Instrumental Composition Written for a Motion Picture or for Television	James Horner	Won
Kansas City Film Critics Circle Awards 1989	Best Film	————	Won
Kansas City Film Critics Circle Awards 1989	Best Director	Edward Zwick	Won
Kansas City Film Critics Circle Awards 1989	Best Supporting Actor	Denzel Washington	Won
NAACP Image Awards 1992	Outstanding Motion Picture	————	Won
NAACP Image Awards 1992	Outstanding Supporting Actor	Denzel Washington	Won
1989 National Board of Review of Motion Pictures Awards	Best Picture	————	Nominated
1989 New York Film Critics Circle Awards	Best Supporting Actor	Denzel Washington	Nominated
1990 Political Film Society Awards	Human Rights	————	Nominated
Writers Guild of America Awards 1989	Best Adapted Screenplay	Kevin Jarre	Nominated

American Film Institute Lists

- AFI's 100 Years...100 Cheers – #31

=== Box office ===
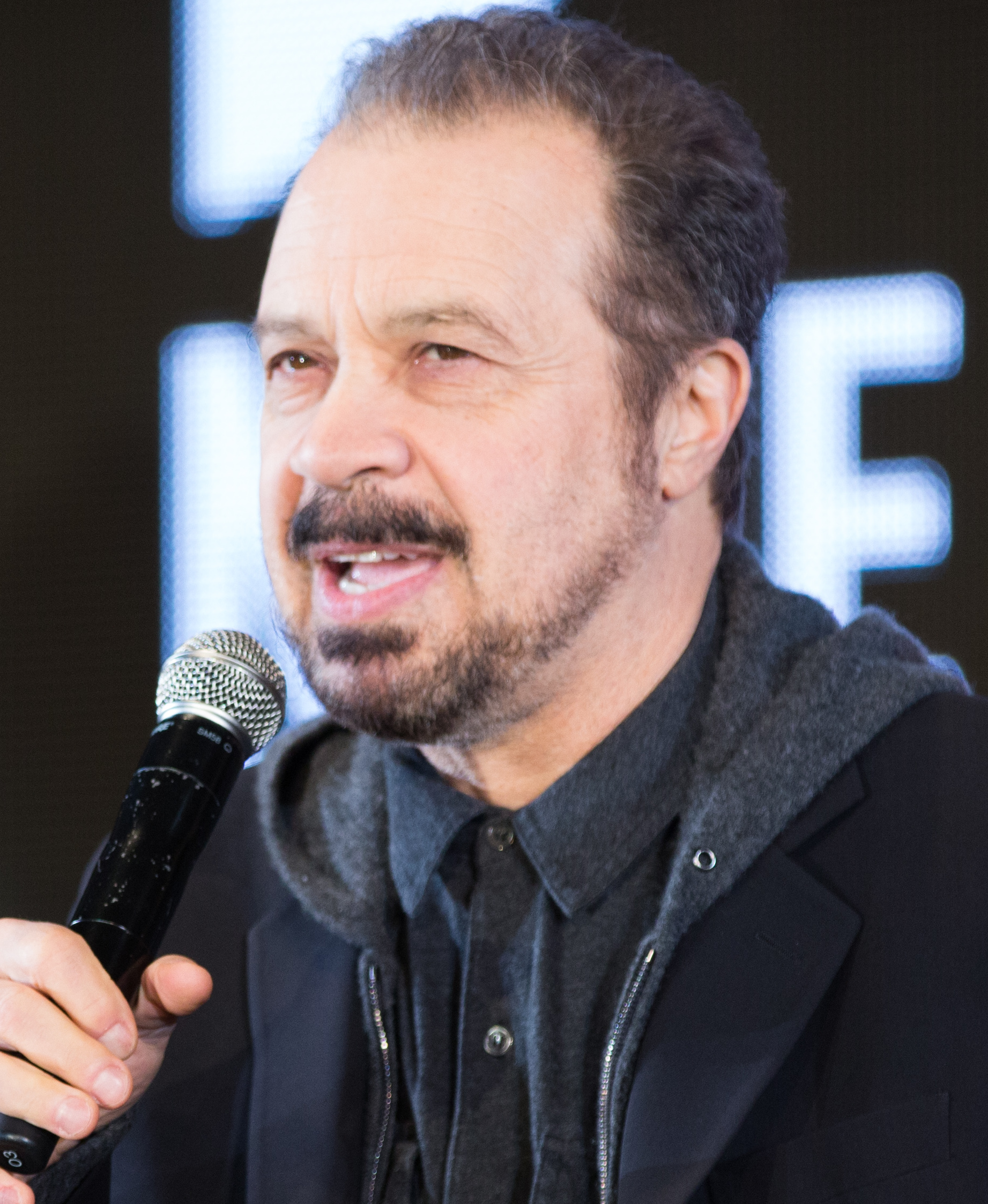
Director Edward Zwick in 2016

The film premiered in cinemas on December 14, 1989, in limited release within the US. During its limited opening weekend, the film grossed $63,661 in business showing at three locations. Its official wide release began in theaters on February 16, 1990. Opening in a distant eighth place, the film earned $2,683,350 (~$5.84 million in 2025) showing at 801 cinemas. The film Driving Miss Daisy soundly beat its competition during that weekend opening in first place with $9,834,744. The film's revenue dropped by 37% in its second week of release, earning $1,682,720. For that particular weekend, the film remained in 8th place screening in 809 theaters not challenging a top five position. The film Driving Miss Daisy, remained in first place grossing $6,107,836 in box office revenue. Glory went on to top out domestically at $26,828,365 (~$60.5 million in 2025) in total ticket sales through a 17-week theatrical run. For 1989 as a whole, the film would cumulatively rank at a box office performance position of 45.

=== Home media ===
Following its release in theaters, the film was released on VHS video format on June 22, 1990 from RCA/Columbia Pictures Home Video. The Region 1 DVD of the film was released in the United States on January 20, 1998 from Columbia TriStar Home Video. Special DVD features include: interactive menus, scene selections, 1.85:1 anamorphic widescreen and 1.33:1 full screen versions, along with subtitles in English, Italian, Spanish and French. A Special Edition DVD of the Film was released on January 30, 2001.

A special repackaged version of Glory was also officially released on DVD on January 2, 2007. It includes two discs featuring: widescreen and full screen versions of the film; Picture-in-Picture video commentary by director Ed Zwick and actors Morgan Freeman and Matthew Broderick; a director's audio commentary; and a documentary entitled, The True Story of Glory Continues narrated by Morgan Freeman. Also included are: an exclusive featurette entitled, Voices of Glory, an original featurette, deleted scenes, production notes, theatrical trailers, talent files, and scene selections.

The Blu-ray disc version of the film was released on June 2, 2009. Special features include: a virtual civil war battlefield, interactive map, The Voice of Glory feature, The True Story Continues documentary, the making of Glory, director's commentary, and deleted scenes. The film is displayed in widescreen 1.85:1 color format in 1080p screen resolution. The audio is enhanced with Dolby TrueHD sound and is available with subtitles in English, Spanish, French, and Portuguese. A UMD version of the film for the Sony PlayStation Portable was also released on July 1, 2008. It features dubbed, subtitled, and color widescreen format viewing options.

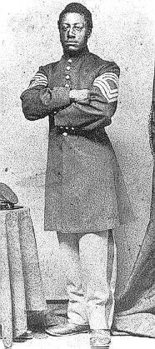
Lewis Henry Douglass

=== Retrospective response ===
In 2019, on the film's 30th anniversary, Glory was re-released in over 600 theaters in the U.S. There were many positive reviews noting its artistic impact. One article noted "the legacy of Zwick’s depiction of the 54th Massachusetts Regiment extends well beyond a 30th anniversary showcase. As a film both about the shared sacrifice of the men of the 54th and the work they left undone .... Glory is a distinctly American story—one so compelling that it has become part of the common curriculum in U.S. history classes across the nation."

== Historical accuracy ==
- Aside from Shaw, none of the other members of the regiment portrayed in the movie were real people.
- The film portrays the 54th as having significant numbers of former slaves. In real life, the regiment was composed mostly of freedmen already living in the North, although some came from Canada and the West Indies. Many of these freed men were from prominent families, including two sons of Frederick Douglass, one of whom, Lewis, became the Sergeant Major.
- The film portrays Shaw as accepting the commission to command the 54th quickly, when in reality he initially rejected the Governor's commission, not wanting to leave his regiment and questioning whether the position would advance his career in the army.
- Although Shaw was an abolitionist, he nevertheless expressed racial viewpoints toward black people conventional for his time, repeatedly referring to them by racial slurs in his letters.
- The regiment did not struggle with being equipped properly. As a favored project of the Massachusetts governor, the regiment was provided everything it required from the outset.
- In the movie a soldier is whipped. Whipping was not permitted in the Union army and no such event ever occurred involving the United States Colored Troops.
- Insofar as the unequal pay, Shaw had already been informed that black soldiers would receive only $10 a month while in South Carolina. He protested to his father and to the governor, not by tearing up his voucher. This issue was not resolved at the time as shown in the film, and problems arising from the unfair pay continued until June 1864.
- Although not depicted in the film, Shaw married Annie Kneeland Haggerty just before the regiment departed for service in South Carolina.
- The soldiers are depicted as celebrating Christmas in the snow; however, the 54th began recruitment in February 1863, and Shaw died at Fort Wagner in July 1863, meaning there was no possibility of Christmas during that period.
- In the final assault on Fort Wagner, the 54th is shown attacking southward, with the ocean on their left. In reality, they attacked northward with the ocean on their right.
- Although the postscript states that Fort Wagner never fell to Union troops, this is inaccurate. Confederate troops abandoned the fort after bombardment and shelling from the Union Navy in September 1863.
- Although the fictional Cabot Forbes is portrayed as being Shaw's best friend and second-in-command, the real second-in-command was Edward Hallowell, who became commander of the 54th after Shaw's death.
- Charles Garrison Harker was a major general in the film. In reality, he never attained that rank or was involved in the campaigns around Charleston. Additionally, the real life Harker was only 25 in 1863, not in his early 40s as portrayed in the movie.

== See also ==
- Denzel Washington filmography
- List of films featuring slavery
- List of films and television shows about the American Civil War
- 1989 in film
- Chester "Bromley" Hoke
