= Chester "Bromley" Hoke =

American veteran of the American Civil War (1847–1913)

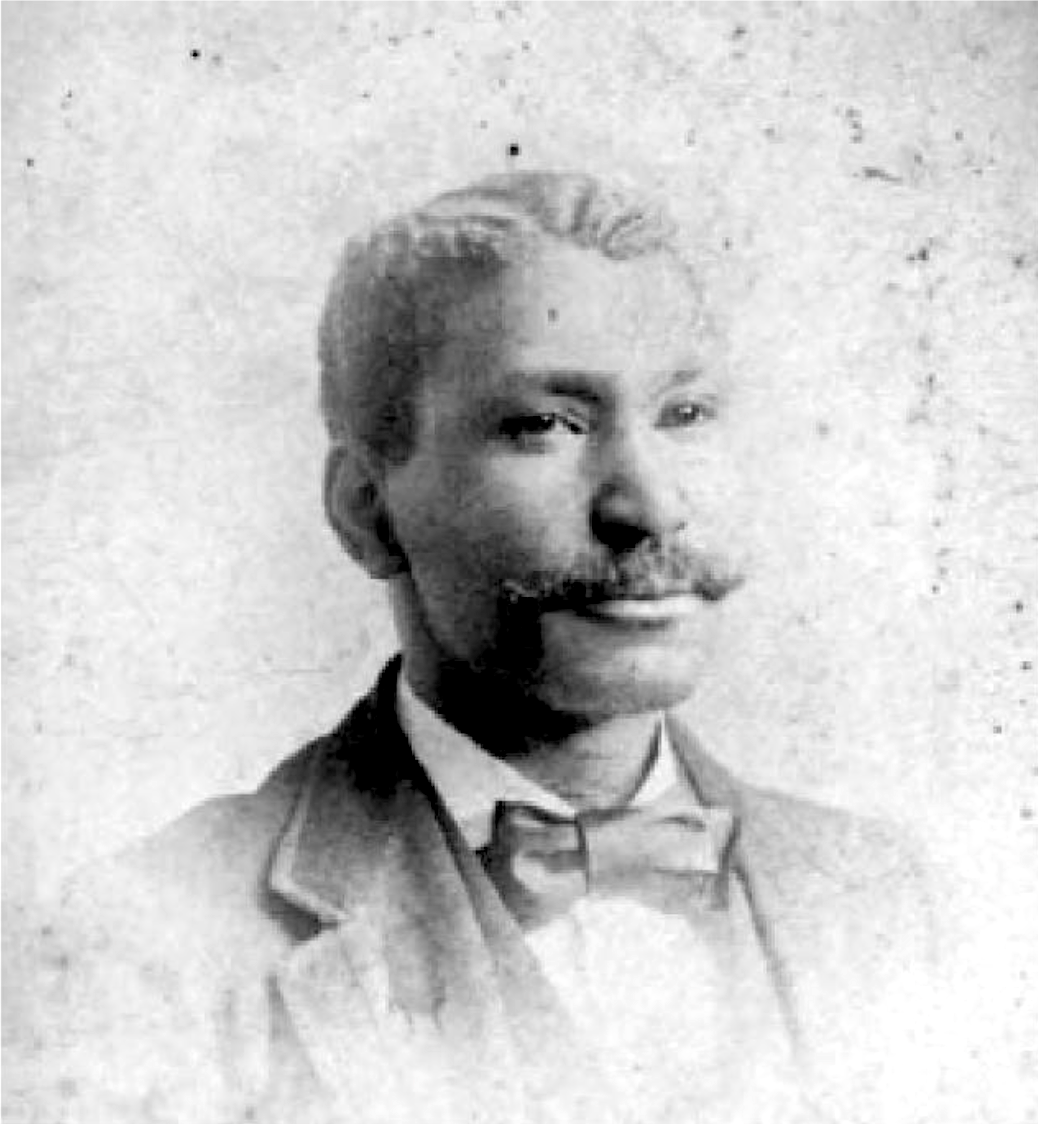
- Born: Chester Hoke; 1847; Canajoharie, New York, U.S.
- Died: March 26, 1913 (aged 65–66); Canajoharie, New York, U.S.
- Resting place: Canajoharie Falls Cemetery, Canajoharie, New York, US
- Other names: Chester "Bromily" Hoke; Bromley Hoke; Bromily Hoke
- Spouse: Elizabeth Ann Phillips

Chester "Bromley" Hoke (1847–1913) was an American who served two years in the 54th Massachusetts Infantry, Company G during the American Civil War, and was a longtime member of the Grand Army of the Republic (G.A.R.), an organization of American Civil War veterans.

== Life and career ==
Chester Hoke was born in 1847, in Canajoharie, New York, to parents Nancy Miller and Moses Hoke. His maternal grandmother was enslaved by Adam Garlock in Canajoharie, and his maternal grandfather was Henry Miller, enslaved by John Miller in Minden.

At age 16, Hoke enrolled as a volunteer soldier in Company G of the 54th Massachusetts Infantry during the American Civil War. His race was listed as "mulatto". Hoke served for two years. After the war he returned to Canajoharie, where he worked as a hotel porter.

A historical marker was erected by the Heritage and Genealogical Society of Montgomery County at his former home, the Hoke House on 131 Mohawk Street in Canajoharie. He was one of the subjects of the film Glory (1989).
