= Flagstaff Mountain (Boulder County, Colorado) =

Mountain in the American state of Colorado

- Location within Colorado

Highest point
- Elevation: 6,983 ft (2,128 m)
- Isolation: 0.77 mi (1.24 km)
- Coordinates: 40°00′06″N 105°18′27″W

Geography
- Location: Boulder County, Colorado, U.S.
- Parent range: Front Range
- Topo map(s): USGS 7.5' topographic map Boulder, Colorado

Climbing
- Easiest route: hike

Flagstaff Mountain is a foothill on the eastern flank of the Front Range of the Rocky Mountains of North America, located in the Flatirons region. The 6,983-foot (2,128 m) peak is located in Boulder Mountain Park in Boulder County, Colorado, United States.

== Mountain ==
From the peak of Flagstaff Mountain one can see Boulder, Metropolitan Denver, and the surrounding mountains. There are hiking and bike trails, picnic areas, the Summit Nature Center, and an outdoor amphitheatre, as well as the Flagstaff House Restaurant on the mountain.

=== Hobo Cave ===
Hobo Cave is a small single-room cave found beneath a rock buttress on Flagstaff Mountain. Climbers sometimes use it for bouldering.

== See also ==
- List of Colorado mountain ranges
- List of Colorado mountain summits
  - List of Colorado fourteeners
  - List of Colorado 4000 meter prominent summits
  - List of the most prominent summits of Colorado
- List of Colorado county high points
