= Louisa R. Shotwell =

American writer and college administrator

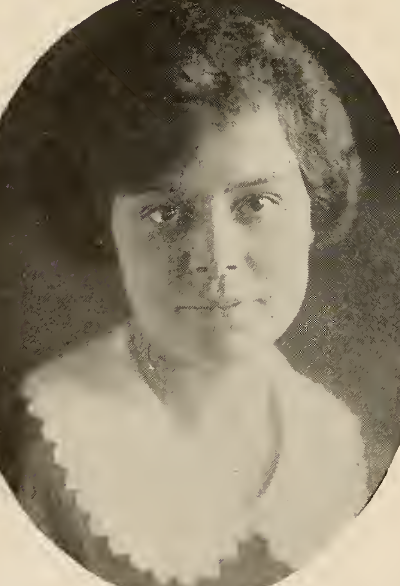
- Louisa R. Shotwell, from the 1924 Wellesley College yearbook
- Born: Louisa Rossiter Shotwell; May 1, 1902; Chicago, Illinois
- Died: January 16, 1993
- Occupation: Writer
- Notable work: Roosevelt Grady (1963)

Louisa Rossiter Shotwell (May 1, 1902 – January 16, 1993) was an American writer and college administrator. She was also a national official of the National Council of Churches.

== Early life ==
Shotwell was born in Chicago, the daughter of Trumbull Smith Shotwell and Ruth Eleanor Clough Shotwell. She was raised in Skaneateles, New York. She graduated from Skaneateles High School and earned a bachelor's degree from Wellesley College in 1924. She completed a master's degree in English at Stanford University in 1928.

== Career ==
Shotwell taught in Skaneateles after college. She was Dean of Women at Hanover College in Indiana, and head of residence at Wilson College in Pennsylvania. She was executive secretary at the First Presbyterian Church of Brooklyn in the 1940s. In the 1950s, she was president of the National Religious Publicity Council, and associate secretary of the Division of Home Missions for the National Council of Churches. She addressed national and regional meetings of the National Council of Churches in that work, and studied UNICEF programs in India, Thailand, Hong Kong, Pakistan, and Indonesia.

Shotwell wrote booklets for church use and books for young readers, often on social justice themes. Books and booklets by Shotwell included This is the Indian American (1955), This is Your Neighbor (1956), This is the Migrant (1958), The Harvesters: The Story of The Migrant People (1961), Roosevelt Grady (1963, illustrated by Peter Burchard), Beyond the Sugar Cane Field: UNICEF in Asia (1964), Adam Bookout (1967), India (1969), Thailand (1969), and Magdalena (1971). She also wrote a skit for church use, The Fruit of the Vine (1954), and a play, The Dark Valley (1964).

Shotwell won the 1964 Nancy Bloch Award for "best children's book on intergroup relations", and the 1964 Lewis Carroll Shelf Award, for Roosevelt Grady. Her Adam Bookout was a finalist for the William Allen White Children's Book Award in 1970.

== Personal life ==
Shotwell died in 1993, aged 90 years. Her papers, including manuscripts of some of her books, are at the University of Wyoming's American Heritage Center.
