= American School of Design =

Former art school in New York City

- Former name: New York School of Design
- Active: 1896–1940s
- Campus: Urban

The American School of Design, formerly known as the New York School of Design, was an art school founded in 1896 in New York City. Alumni included children's book illustrators Adrienne Adams and Crosby Bonsall, and comic-book artists including Bill Fraccio and Fred Kida.

== History ==
The American School of Design was founded as the New York School of Design in New York City, New York, in 1896. In 1935, it was located at 625 Fifth Avenue, and by the following year had relocated to 625 Madison Avenue. By 1942, it was located at 133 East 55th Street, under recently installed president Matlack Price. It remained in existence through at least the late 1940s.

In addition to fine art, the school also offered courses in fashion design and costume design.

In 1928, it inaugurated the Warren O. Van Brunt Scholarship, determined by a competition among high-school students. In 1937, the first prize was a two-year scholarship and the second a one-year scholarship, with two honorable mentions supplying half-tuition.

Its alumni included children's book illustrators Adrienne Adams and Crosby Bonsall, and comic-book artists including Bill Fraccio and Fred Kida.

It is unrelated to the New Bauhaus, American School of Design, in Chicago, Illinois.
