= Adrienne Adams (illustrator) =

American illustrator (1906–2002)

- Born: February 10, 1906; Fort Smith, Arkansas, United States
- Died: December 3, 2002 (aged 96); Rolla, Missouri, United States
- Education: University of Missouri, American School of Design
- Known for: Illustration and artist
- Awards: Caldecott Medal (among runners-up, 1960 and 1962); Rutgers Award (1973); University of Southern Mississippi Medallion (1977)

Adrienne Adams (February 10, 1906 – December 3, 2002) was an American children's book illustrator as well as an artist and writer of children's books. She won two Caldecott Honors (in 1960 and 1962) and in 1973 she was awarded the Rutgers Award for overall contributions to children's literature. In 1977, she was awarded the University of Southern Mississippi Medallion.

== Life and career ==
Adams was born in Fort Smith, Arkansas, and grew up in Oklahoma. She obtained a B.A. at Stephens College (which awarded her the Alumnae Achievement Award in 1964) and then attended the University of Missouri. She also was awarded the University of Southern Mississippi's Medallion in 1977.

She moved to New York in 1929 to study at the American School of Design and until 1949 she was a free-lance designer of displays, murals, textiles, greeting cards, etc. She married children's book writer John Lonzo Anderson on August 17, 1934, and in 1942 illustrated his first book, Bag of Smoke, to begin her career as an illustrator. She became a full-time illustrator in 1952, and illustrated more than 30 books, ranging from contemporary authors including Rumer Godden, Irwin Shapiro and Aileen Fisher to the fairy tales of Hans Christian Andersen and the Brothers Grimm. She also wrote and illustrated six children books of her own.

Adams and Anderson lived together in Lebanon Township, New Jersey.

== Selected works ==
By other writers

- 1954 – Impunity Jane: The Story of a Pocket Doll by Rumer Godden (Viking Press)
- 1957 – Mouse House by Godden (Viking)
- 1957 – The Easter Bunny That Overslept by Priscilla and Otto Friedrich (Lothrop, Lee & Shepard)
- 1958 – The Story of Holly and Ivy by Godden (Viking)
- 1959 – Houses from the Sea by Alice E. Goudey (Charles Scribner's Sons) – one runner-up for the 1960 Caldecott Medal
- 1960 – The Shoemaker and the Elves by the Brothers Grimm (Scribner's) – ALA Notable Book
- 1961 – The Day We Saw the Sun Come Up by Alice E. Goudey (Scribner's) – one runner-up for the 1962 Caldecott Medal
- 1961 – Thumbelina by Hans Christian Andersen (Scribner's) – ALA Notable Book
- 1963 – Bring a Torch, Jeannette, Isabella by W. Saboly (Scribner's) – ALA Notable Book
- 1964 – Snow-White and Rose-Red by Grimm (Scribner's)
- 1968 – Jorinde and Joringel by Grimm (Scribner's) – ALA Notable Book
- 1973 – Twice Upon a Time by Irwin Shapiro (Xerox Family Education)
- 1975 – Hansel and Gretel by Grimm (Scribner's)
- 1977 – The River Bank from The Wind in the Willows by Kenneth Grahame (Scribner's)
- 1983 – The Easter Bunny That Overslept by Priscilla and Otto Friedrich (Lothrop, Lee & Shepard) – revised (see 1957)

Self-illustrated

Library of Congress catalogs five children's picture books with text and illustrations by Adams.

- 1971 – A Woggle of Witches (Charles Scribner's Sons)
- 1976 – The Easter Egg Artists (Scribner's)
- 1978 – The Christmas Party (The Scribner Book Company)
- 1980 – The Great Valentine's Day Balloon Race (Scribner)
- 1981 – A Halloween Happening (Scribner)

== Sources ==
- Something About the Author, vol. 8, pp. 1–2.
- Illustrators of Children's Books: 1957–1966, 1968, pp. 70–71.
- Contemporary Authors: New Revision Series, vol. 1, pp. 9–10.
