= James Warren (publisher) =

American magazine publisher

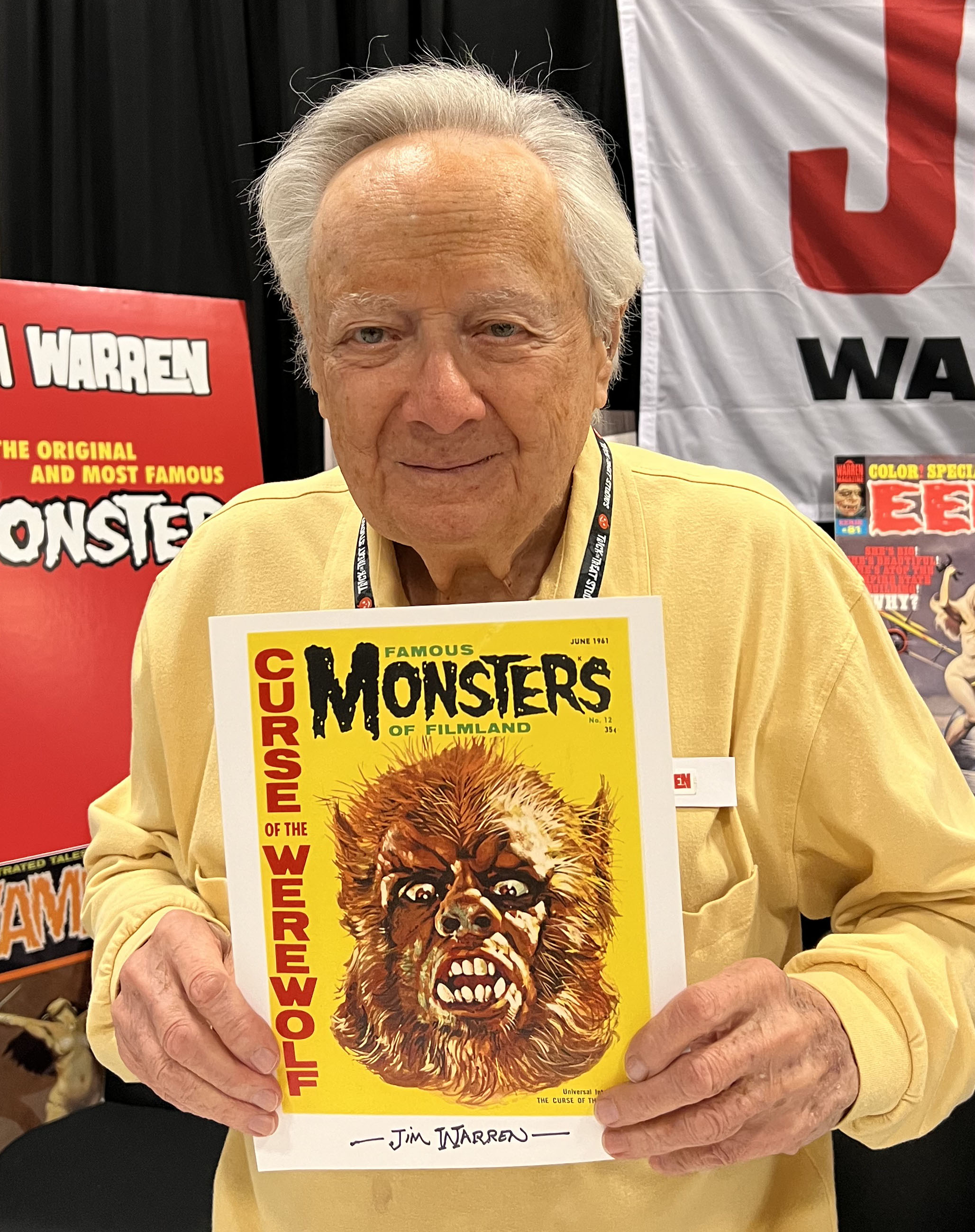
- James Warren at the Famous Monsters Convention at Valley Forge, Pennsylvania, October 14, 2023.
- Born: James Warren Taubman; July 29, 1930 (age 96); Philadelphia, Pennsylvania, US
- Education: University of Pennsylvania
- Occupation: Publisher
- Years active: 1957 – 1983
- Notable work: Famous Monsters of Filmland, Creepy, Eerie, Vampirella, Comix International
- Website: https://www.facebook.com/warrenpublishingonline/

James Warren (born James Warren Taubman; July 29, 1930) is a magazine publisher and founder of Warren Publishing. Magazines published by Warren include Famous Monsters of Filmland, the horror-comics magazines Creepy, Eerie, and Vampirella, the war anthology Blazing Combat, and the science-fiction anthology 1984 (later renamed 1994), among others. Contributors to Warren's magazines included such significant artists as Neal Adams, Richard Corben, Bernie Wrightson, Johnny Craig, Reed Crandall, Steve Ditko, Frank Frazetta, Russ Heath, Esteban Maroto, Alex Niño, Sanjulián, John Severin, Tom Sutton, Angelo Torres, Al Williamson, and Wally Wood, and writers/editors including Archie Goodwin, Louise Jones, Don McGregor, and Doug Moench. He appointed Billy Graham as the first known African-American art director in mainstream, nationally distributed comic books/comics magazines.

== Early life and education ==
James Warren was born at Mount Sinai Hospital in Philadelphia, Pennsylvania. An art student during his grammar school and high school years, he came in second one year in the Pennsylvania State Scholastic Art Competition. He attended the University of Pennsylvania School of Architecture and served in ROTC, leaving his junior year to enlist in the United States Army when the Korean War began. Accepted into Armored Infantry Officers Training, he was deafened six months later during training when he got too close to the .50 caliber heavy machine gun. He was medically discharged a few months later, and did not return to Penn.

== After Hours and Famous Monsters of Filmland ==
In the 1950s, Warren worked in advertising as an artist and writer. Inspired by Hugh Hefner's magazine Playboy, he launched his own men's magazine, After Hours, which lasted four issues and led to his arrest on charges of obscenity and pornography in Philadelphia, Pennsylvania, where he was based. He recalled in an interview published in 1999:

...a lot of publishers said, 'Look at all that money! Look at those Playboy sales! Let's put out an imitation!' And by the time 35 Playboy imitations came out, mine was one of them. It was called After Hours ... and I got my first experience with national magazine distributors and retailers, and with large magazine printing plants. It lasted four issues. It was awful.... I learned the hard way about Teamsters, truckers, loading docks, slowdowns at printing plants and bankers who welsh on you.

After Hours magazine #1, 1957

Through After Hours, Warren met his future collaborator, Hollywood literary agent Forrest J Ackerman, who submitted 21 pages of sci-fi and monster-film features, including the pictorial "Girls from Science-Fiction Movies, all published in After Hours #4", leading this issue to be nicknamed Famous Monsters #0 by collectors. Following correspondence and telephone calls, they met in person in New York City in late 1957. There, Ackerman showed Warren a horror movie-themed issue of the French magazine Cinéma (revue) 57 by Fédération française des ciné-clubs. Recalling his youth seeing black-and-white horror movies in theaters, and realizing many of those movies were playing on television to a new generation of children, he was inspired to launch an accompanying magazine "carefully crafted to spoof the monsters and yet treat them as 'heroes' ... The adults wouldn't buy it, but the kids — those millions of Baby Boomers — would. A few weeks later I was in Forry Ackerman's living room in California, choosing the photos and article content for a one-shot magazine called Famous Monsters of Filmland, which went on sale that January with a February 1958 cover date." Warren said it sold out its 200,000 print run within days.

He financed the first issue, for which the upstate New York printer wanted payment upfront, through "some advance money from my distributor," Kable News,

...but I was $9,000 short. I walked into a bank in Philadelphia to plead for a loan. I said, 'I'm not going to tell you anything about the magazine but I need this loan. The banker said, 'For collateral, you'll pledge your printing presses and your equipment. We require that as collateral against the loan.' I said, 'My entire equipment list consists of a typewriter, two yellow pads, a drawing board and me. I have a distributor, an idea for a magazine, and I have a printer but I need $9,000.' I told him I wasn't going to leave the bank without the money. I must have sounded threatening because I got the loan. The printer got his money up front. The magazines were shipped, the newsstands sold out and Warren Publishing Company was born."

Famous Monsters of Filmland #1, 1958.

A second issue was published eight months later "because I had to wait until the money came in from the first issue, and Kable wouldn't advance it to me." Warren said.

Warren moved to New York City in the 1960s, with his "Captain Company" (the mail-order service he concurrently founded to sell horror-related items in Famous Monsters of Filmland) remaining in Philadelphia, where overhead was cheaper. He found a duplex penthouse in midtown Manhattan where he lived on the top floor, using the ground floor living room, dining room, bath and kitchen as his "Warren Publishing" editorial office. By this time he was also publishing the magazines Wildest Westerns, Spacemen, and Screen Thrills Illustrated. In collaboration with Harvey Kurtzman, the creator of MAD, Warren published the satirical Help! magazine, whose staff included future feminist icon and co-founder of Ms. magazine Gloria Steinem, and future Monty Python's Flying Circus member and film director Terry Gilliam. Robert Crumb's first professional magazine work was published in Help!

== Creepy and other comics magazines ==
In the mid-1960s, inspired by the EC Comics of the 1950s, Warren launched the black-and-white horror-comics magazines Creepy, Eerie and Vampirella. He continued to publish a variety of magazines until 1983, when he left the field due to health problems.

== Later years ==
In 2008, he established a new venture, Jim Warren Publishing. Later, Warren established himself as Warren Publishing Online, and promoted this venture through a Facebook page.

In July 2024, Warren received the Will Eisner Hall of Fame Award from the San Diego Comic-Con committee.

== Public Appearances ==
July 1971: Warren was the keynote speaker at the New York Comic Art Convention, in New York City.

January 1973: Warren attended the CosmiCon at York University in Toronto, Ontario, Canada.

November 1974: Warren hosted the 1st Famous Monsters Convention and attended it with Peter Cushing and Forrest Ackerman.

November 1975: Warren hosted the 2nd Famous Monsters Convention and a make-up demonstration was performed on Warren by Verne Langdon.

March 1998: Warren had a booth at the Big Apple Comic Convention in New York City.

May 1999: Warren attended a signing event for Famous Monsters of Filmland at the Chiller Theater Expo in Rutherford, New Jersey.

July 2005: Warren was an official guest at San Diego Comic-Con.

May 2008: Warren gave a lecture at the Abington Public Library, (Abington, Pennsylvania) where he discussed his career.

July 2008: Warren was official guest at San Diego Comic-Con and participated on the Famous Monsters panel with Forrest Ackerman and Verne Langdon.

May 2009: Warren was a featured guest at the MonsterPalooza convention in Burbank, California

October 2023: Warren appeared at the first Famous Monsters Festival in Valley Forge, Pennsylvania. There he was reunited with his former art director, Bill Mohalley.

October 2024: Warren appeared at the second Famous Monster Festival in Valley Forge, Pennsylvania.

== Magazines published ==
1. After Hours (1957)
2. Help (1960 - 1965)
3. Famous Monsters of Filmland (1958 - 1983)
4. Creepy (1964 - 1983)
5. Eerie (1966 - 1983)
6. Vampirella (1969 - 1983)
7. Comix International (1974 - 1975)
8. The Spirit (1974 - 1976)
9. The Rook (1979 - 1982)
10. Monster World (1964–1966)
11. Screen Thrills Illustrated (1962)
12. Spacemen
13. Teen Love Stories
14. Warren Presents
15. Wildest Westerns (1960–1961)

Additional Publications:

1. Famous Monsters Star Wars Spectacular
2. House of Horror
3. The Mole People
4. The Odd Comic World of Richard Corben
5. Freak Out U.S.A.
6. Spacemen 1965 Yearbook
7. The Spirit Special
8. The True Fantastic Story of Tiny Tim (1968)
