= T. Casey Brennan =

American comic book writer

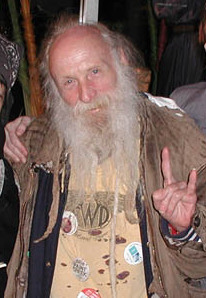
Brennan in 2009

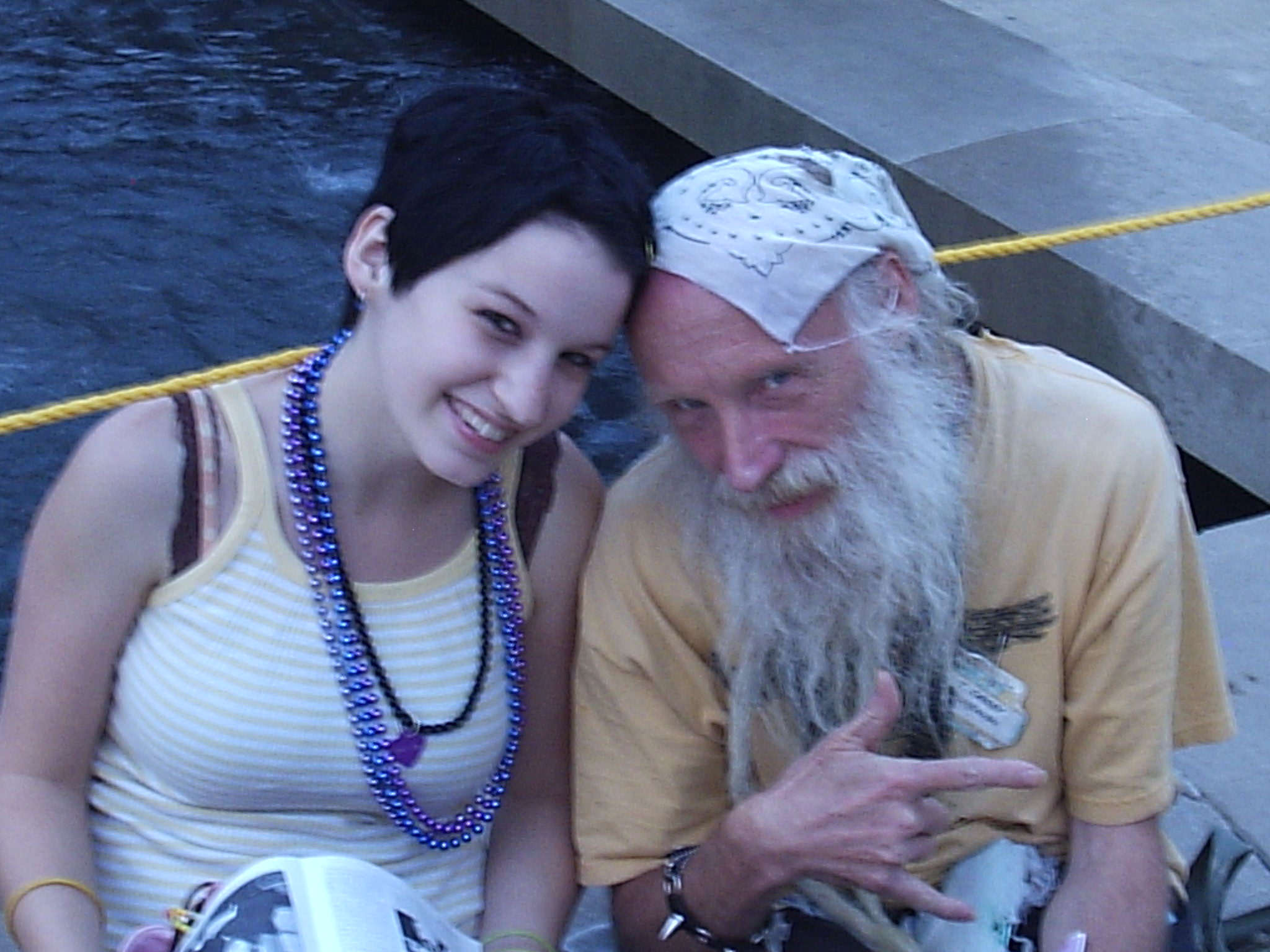
Brennan (on right), Ann Arbor, Michigan

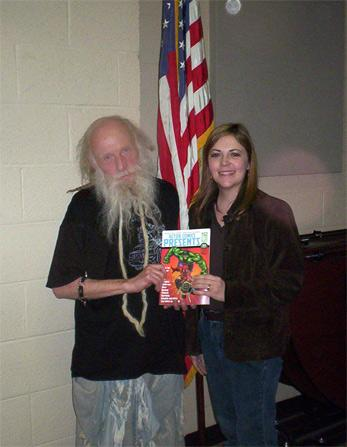
Brennan (on left), Ann Arbor, Michigan

Terrance Casey Brennan is an American comic book writer.

During the 1970s, he wrote for Warren Publishing's black-and-white horror-comics anthologies Creepy and Eerie, and Vampirella. He also wrote for DC Comics' House of Mystery and Archie Comics' Red Circle Sorcery.

In the 1980s, Brennan campaigned to have depictions of smoking in comics banned, which led then-Gov. Bill Clinton of Arkansas to issue a proclamation designating January 1990 as "T. Casey Brennan Month."

== Bibliography ==
=== Actor Comics Presents ===
(Hero Initiative)

- 1: "Hypothetical Cerebus" (art by Dave Sim)

=== Creepy ===
- 31: "Death of a Stranger" (art by Ernie Colón)
- 36: "On the Wings of a Bird" (art by Jerry Grandenetti)
- 37: "The Cut-Throat Cat Blues" (art by Ernie Colón)
- 38: "Escape From Nowhere World" (art by Jerry Grandenetti); "Loathsome Lore!" (art by Ken Kelly)
- 43: "The Golden Sun Disc of the Incas" (art by Richard Corben)
- 44: "The Last Days of Hans Bruder" (art by Frank Bolle)
- 45: "Dungeons of the Soul" (art by Felix Mas)
- 47: "Mark of the Phoenix" (art by Reed Crandall)
- 50: "Climbers of the Tower" (art by Felix Mas)
- 61: "A Stranger in Eternity" (art by Adolfo Abellan)
- 63: "A Ghost of a Chance" (art by Vicente Alcazar)

=== Eerie ===
- 22: "Family Curse" (art by Tony Williamsune)
- 29: "Strange Gateway" (art by Jack Sparling)
- 36: "Eerie's Monster Gallery" (art by Pablo Marcos)
- 38: "The Carrier of the Serpent" (art by Jerry Grandenetti); "A Stranger in Hell" (art by Esteban Maroto)

=== Vampirella ===
- 5: "Escape Route!" (art by Mike Royer)
- 17: "Beware Dreamers!" (art by Jose Gonzalez)
- 18: "Dracula Still Lives!" (art by Jose Gonzalez)
- 19: "The Shadow of Dracula!" (art by Jose Gonzalez)
- 20: "When Wakes the Dead!" (art by Jose Gonzalez)
- 21: "Prologue" (art by Jose Gonzalez)

=== Vampus ===
- 45 "El Disco del Sol" (art by Richard Corben) Page 1

=== Fantasy Quarterly ===
- 1: "Doorway to the Gods" (art by Dave Sim) Page 1Page 2Page 3Page 4Page 5Page 6

=== House of Mystery ===
- 260: "Dead Wrong" (art by Jerry Grandenetti)
- 267: "A Strange Way to Die" (art by Abe Ocampo)
- 268: "The Man Who Spoke With Spirits" (art by Jess Jodloman)
- 274: "The Soul of Faustus" (art by Jerry Bingham and Tex Blaisdell)

=== Nightmare ===
(Skywald Publications)

- 11: "Where Gods Once Stood" (art by Carlos Garzon)

=== Orb ===
- 5 "One Man's Madness" (art by Gene Day)

=== Power Comics ===
- 1: "A Gift of Wonder" (art by Vince Marchesano); "A Boy and his Aardvark" (art by Dave Sim) Page 1Page 2Page 3Page 4Page 5

=== Red Circle Sorcery ===
- 6: "Black Fog" (art by Gray Morrow) Page 1 Page 2
- 7: "The Benefactor" (art by Vicente Alcazar)
- 10: "The Demon Rider" (art by Jack Abel and Wally Wood)

=== Tara On The Dark Continent ===
- 2: "The Black Mistress: Mystery of the Drowned Dowager" (art by Bill Black) Page 1Page 2Page 3

=== The Equinox, Volume V, Number 3 ===
- "What Rabbits Are Like"

== The Daniel Fry connection ==
One of T. Casey Brennan's early publishers was alleged UFO contactee Daniel Fry, who published his essays in Understanding magazine; examples from October 1974 and September 1988 issues are posted on the Internet.

== Audio/video ==
- Miller, Jordan (July 24, 2009). My days as an unemployed person. First installment [T. Casey Brennan interview]. AnnArbor.com.
- Audio interview with T. Casey Brennan
- T. Casey Brennan in February 2008 with band Nessie on YouTube
- Kitaro's Sideshow, podcast in Hebrew from Israel, featured songs by T. Casey Brennan in episodes #36 and #37.
