= Enric Sió =

- Born: Enric Sió i Guardiola; April 5, 1942; Badalona, Spain
- Died: October 31, 1998 (aged 56); Barcelona, Spain
- Occupations: Comics artist, illustrator, photographer,publicist

Enric Sió i Guardiola (5 April 1942 – 2 November 1998) was a Spanish comics artist, photographer, illustrator and publicist. Together with other authors of his generation, like Josep María Beá (1942), Luis García (1946), Felipe Hernández Cava (1953), Carlos Giménez (1941), Fernando Fernández (1940) and Adolfo Usero (1941) he was part of the Spanish comics renovation, often being categorized in the "pictorical" style group.

== Biography ==
=== Early years ===
The son of a textile company director, Sió was born in Badalona. He studied Economics but his vocation led him to also begin studying Fine Arts. In 1960, he began his professional career as a comic book artist at Editorial Mateu and later Bruguera, also publishing romance comics in the British publisher Fleetway's Valentine magazine through the Selecciones Ilustradas agency. He soon abandoned this work due to the limited financial prospects and took a position as an editor and supervisor at the Catalan publisher Edicions 62/Ediciones Península for a year and a half.

=== Maturity ===
In 1966 he returned to comics, developing several episodes of the war comic Battler Britton. His name became known in the comic book world a year later when he drew Lavinia 2016 o la Guerra de los Poetas, with a script by Emili Teixidor, on commission for the magazine Oriflama. The comic is a subtle satire of the cultural and political life of Catalonia at the time and is considered the first politically critical comic against Francoism.

In 1968 he drew for editorial Salvat two full-color titles: Nus y el Atleta y Sorang in which he experimented several visual and narrative innovations. During this period he also collaborated with Román Gubern on his book El lenguaje de los Cómics.

In 1969 and 1970, he drew the series Aghardi and Mis Miedos, which were published in the horror magazine Drácula. Simultaneously, based on an idea by his friend, the screenwriter Andrés Martín, he created what is considered his masterpiece, Mara, in which he continued his stylistic and narrative experiments. It consists of 16 short stories that originally appeared in the Italian magazine Linus. Some of them were published in Spain by the Barcelona magazine Bocaccio and later in Madrid's Sunday of but it was only compiled as an album in a 1980 edition. This edition included a prologue by his friend Carlos Saura.

In 1974, he went into voluntary exile in Italy, feeling "suffocated by the bleak social and political landscape of Spain". There he met Italian adult comics authors, with whom he identified and to whom he has frequently been compared, such as Guido Crepax, Hugo Pratt, and Dino Battaglia. In Italy, he published Mara and Aghardí in the magazine Linus and contributed to a section of the comic Il Casanova, although he was asked to modify it due to its explicit erotic content. It would be published uncensored later in the magazine Rambla.

In 1977 he settled with his wife in the Latin Quarter of Paris and published several episodes of the series Los Grandes Descubrimientos for the Larousse publishing house and for the magazine Charlie Hebdo.

He returned to Barcelona in 1979 where he created a series of short stories that were published in the magazines Rambla, Tótem and the French Pilote.

In 1985, taking advantage of the boom in adult comic magazines, he launched the magazine La Oca as editor, with a format similar to the Italian Linus, in which he published some of his favorite authors such as Crepax, Battaglia, and Sergio Toppi, as well as his own works and cultural articles. It was conceived as a cultured and high-quality alternative to the magazines of the time, which Sió disdained; however, it was unsuccessful and had to cease publication after only four issues, leaving some series unfinished.

=== Other activities ===
After this experience, he abandoned comics to dedicate himself to other creative pursuits such as photography, advertising, and film. In 1992, he published a photography book titled Barcelona, Guapa! featuring nudes in emblematic locations around the city. In one of these photographs, a model undressed herself during a match between Real Madrid and Barcelona at Camp Nou, a moment captured by the media present and causing considerable controversy. In the field of advertising, his campaign for the Benetton brand stands out. As an illustrator, he created, among many other commissions, the cover for Gillermina Motta's album Visca l'Amor.

Enric Sió died in 31 October 1998; his last work was a caricature of Pinochet published in the newspaper Avui in that same day.

== Awards ==
He received numerous awards and recognitions throughout his career, including the Lucca in 1969, the Yellow Kid in 1971, the European Illustration for the book Autodafe (1976-77), and awards at the Treviso and Toulouse fairs.
