= Selecciones Ilustradas =

Spanish art agency

Selecciones Ilustradas (sometimes known as S.I.) is a Spanish art agency founded by Josep Toutain.

== Warren Publishing ==
Selecciones Ilustradas is probably most well-known in America due to its connections with Warren Publishing, where S.I.'s artists drew hundreds of stories between 1971 through 1983. The deal with Warren and S.I. began in 1971 when Toutain met with Warren publisher Jim Warren. S.I.'s artists began appearing in Warren magazines starting in Vampirella #11 in May 1971. By 1973 S.I. artists provided the majority of the covers and interior stories in Warren's magazines, a dominance that continued until the late 1970s. S.I. artists also contributed to Warren rival Skywald Publications throughout the early to mid-1970s.

== Artists ==
Artists associated with Selecciones Ilustradas include:

- Juan Antonio Abellán
- Vicente Alcazar
- Artur Aldomà Puig
- César Álvarez Cañete
- Pedro Añaños
- Rafael Aura León
- Alfonso Azpiri
- Ángel Badía Camps
- Enric Badia Romero
- Jordi Badia Romero
- Josep María Beá
- Luis Bermejo
- Emilio Bernardó
- Jordi Bernet
- Aurelio Bevia
- Jesús Blasco
- Joaquín Blázquez
- Daniel Branca
- Joan Beltrán Bofill
- Jaime Brocal Remohí
- José María Cardona Blasi
- Emilia Castañeda Martínez
- Florenci Clavé
- Luis Collado Coch
- Antonio Colmeiro
- Francisco Cueto
- Jesús Durán
- Ramón Escolano
- Fernando Fernández
- Manel Ferrer
- Alfons Figueras
- Alfonso Font
- Chiqui de la Fuente
- Víctor de la Fuente
- Miguel Fuster
- Jorge Gálvez Badía
- Amador García Cabrera
- Luis García Mozos
- José García Pizarro
- Carlos Giménez
- Juan Giménez
- Eugenio Giner
- Jordi Ginés Soteras
- Domingo Gómez Álvarez
- José González Navarro
- Francisco González Vilanova
- Göte Göransson
- Rafael Griera Calderón
- Josep Gual Tutusaus
- Fernando Güell
- Francisco Guinovart Rotllán
- Eloy Jiménez
- Jaime Juez Castellà
- Jorge Longarón
- José Lombardía
- Rafael Losada
- Rafael López Espí
- César López Vera
- Esteban Maroto
- Santiago Martín Salvador
- Joan Martí
- José María Martín Sauri
- Rafael Martínez
- Pedro Martínez Henares
- Félix Mas
- Josep Miralles
- Isidro Monés
- Enric Montserrat
- Ángel Nadal
- Joan Nebot
- Josep Nebot
- José Ortiz
- Suso Peña
- José Antonio Pérez Mascaró
- Carlos Pino
- Carles Prunés
- Miguel Quesada
- Lluís Ribas
- Luis Roca
- Felipe de la Rosa
- José Rubio
- Leopoldo Sánchez
- Manuel Sanjulián
- Santiago Scalabroni
- Vicente Segrelles
- Enric Sió
- Manfred Sommer
- Ramón Torrents
- Enric Torres-Prat
- Adolfo Usero Abellán
- Víctor Arriagada Ríos
- María del Carmen Vila Migueloa

== In fiction ==
The cartoonist Carlos Giménez wrote a fictionalized account on his stint at the studios in his series Los profesionales, where a thinly veiled depiction of the studio was given the name Creaciones Ilustradas.
