= Rafael Aura León =

Spanish comics artist (1939–1993)

Rafael Auraleón
- Born: Rafael Aura León; 22 December 1939
- Died: 24 June 1993 (aged 53)
- Area: artist
- Pseudonym: Auraleón
- Notable works: Creepy, Eerie, Vampirella

Rafael Aura León (22 December 1939 - 24 June 1993) was a Spanish comics artist, known primarily as Auraleón, which is how he signed his work.

== Biography ==
Born in Barcelona, Auraleón's career began in 1959 when he joined the Spanish agency Selecciones Ilustradas, through which he worked in British comics in the 1960s, drawing westerns for Lone Star, war stories for Commando, Air Ace, Combat and Conflict, romance stories for Romance in Pictures, and science fiction stories for Space Ace.

Auraleón joined American company Warren Publishing in 1971, becoming one of their most prolific artists, with 69 stories in total. This would rank him fourth among all artists at Warren after José Ortiz, Esteban Maroto and Luis Bermejo. Auraleón worked primarily in Vampirella, with approximately 20 stories appearing in Creepy and approximately 8 in Eerie. Auraleon was the recurring artist for the series Pantha, in 1974 and 1975. He also drew the series Cassandra St. Knight in 1981, and Sweetwater Nessie in 1982. All three series appeared in Vampirella.

Auraleón remained with Warren until its bankruptcy in 1983, also producing short strips to his own scripts for the Spanish edition of Toutain's 1984/1994. Many of these also appeared in French in Ere Comprimee magazine, and his late solo work for the Spanish 1984 has been collected in book form as Caos y otras historias fantasticas (2018).

Auraleón continued to work with Selecciones Ilustradas after Warren's collapse, drawing the series Viaje al Infierno which was published in the Spanish version of Creepy. After its publication in 1984, he left both S.I. and the comics field entirely. Suffering from depression, he took his own life in 1993.

== Selected bibliography ==
- Creepy issues 42, 49–51, 53, 56, 90, 100, 105, 110–112, 114, 125, 135, 136, 140, 141, 145
- Eerie issues 37, 39, 40, 45, 46, 74, 88, 92, 110
- Vampirella issues 16, 18, 20, 22–26, 28–33, 35, 36, 38, 39, 41, 42, 44, 47, 50, 51, 53, 58, 65, 70, 72, 77–79, 84–86, 88–90, 92–98, 101–103, 106, 108, 110, 112
