= Bill DuBay =

- Born: William Bryan Dubay; January 11, 1948
- Died: April 15, 2010 (aged 62) Portland, Oregon, U.S.
- Areas: Writer, Artist, Editor
- Pseudonyms: Will Richardson, Dube
- Spouses: Peggy Buckler; Vanessa Hart
- Children: 5

William Bryan Dubay (January 11, 1948 – April 15, 2010), also known by the pseudonyms Will Richardson, and Dube, was an American comic-book editor, writer and artist best known as editor and writer for Warren Publishing, including that company's horror-comics magazines Creepy, Eerie and Vampirella.

== Biography ==
=== Early career ===
DuBay was the first of seven children born to Richard and Dorothy (née Lucas) DuBay, the latest in a multigenerational family line of Lucases, Searses, and Spreckles in San Francisco, California, became interested in comics after an uncle presented him with a gift of comic albums starring the Hergé character Tintin. DuBay began in the comic book field as a fan artist whose work included writing and drawing a backup feature in the fanzine Komix Illustrated in 1964, variously writing and drawing features in the fanzines Fantasy Heroes' Hangout and The Voice of Comicdom that same year, and drawing the preexisting superhero character Powerman in the fanzine Star-Studded Comics No. 9 (July 1966), a black-and-white, newsprint magazine published by Texas Trio. That latter story, "The Crimes of the Transmuter", by writer Dave Bibby, was reprinted in the 1997 Hamster Press book Fandom's Finest Comics.

DuBay's earliest credited comic-book works are two satiric humor stories: the four-page Blooperman story "Bound in the Badcave", written by Gary Friedrich and appearing in Charlton Comics' Go-Go No. 4 (Dec. 1966), and the four-page "Adult Super-Hero Daydreams", penciled by DuBay and written by himself and Roy Thomas in Not Brand Echh No. 13 (May 1969). In between, he published a piece of science fiction fan art in the "Creepy Fan Club" section of Warren Publishing's Creepy No. 12 (Dec. 1966).

DuBay returned to Warren as a professional with the story "Movie Dissector", written by R. Michael Rosen, in Creepy No. 32 (April 1970). Publisher James Warren recalled in a 1999 interview, "The first time I saw him. I said, 'You are too young to work for this company, too young to work for anybody. You are a callow youth. You don't even shave yet. Let me see your work.' I took one look and said, 'You're hired.'"

In short order, he began writing stories as well as drawing them, beginning with the four-page "Life Species" in Eerie No. 30 (Nov. 1970), and then segued from art to become primarily a writer. He became editor of the Warren line with Creepy No. 49 and Eerie No. 43 (both Nov. 1972) and Vampirella No. 21 (Dec. 1972).

=== Warren Publishing ===
DuBay, listed as managing editor until being formally credited as editor with the issues cover-dated September 1973, revamped the line by giving the magazines a graphic redesign, dropping fan-participation pages, instituting new features, and creating a unified look and feel. He also presided over the introduction of a stable of freelance artists from Spain, whose illustrative style provided an alternative to that of American comics artists. For a short time in mid-1974, former Warren editor Archie Goodin returned, a hire that had DuBay reassigned to senior editor. When Goodwin departed to work for Marvel Comics, DuBay, beginning with issues cover-dated September 1974, was once more named Warren Publishing's editor.

He continued in that post until being succeeded by writer Louise Jones, initially credited as senior editor beginning with the May 1976 issues; DuBay remained as a freelance contributing editor. After four years, Jones, too, decamped for Marvel. DuBay, who had adopted the pseudonym Will Richardson in the Warren science-fiction anthology 1984 No. 11 (Feb. 1980), became editor for a third time, under that pen name, beginning with Creepy No. 117 and Vampirella No. 87 (both May 1980) and Eerie No. 111 (June 1980).

He was succeeded a year later by Chris Adames, who left after six months to work at Archie Comics. DuBay returned for his fourth run as editor, with Timothy Moriarty as managing editor. Moriarty in turn succeeded DuBay after four months, becoming Warren's final editor upon the company's demise in 1983.

Other Warren magazines DuBay edited included Comix International, 1984 (renamed 1994 with issue #11), The Rook, The Goblin, and The Spirit. The final Warren editor, Timothy Moriarty, in 2005 described DuBay as "a volatile guy. Very funny and creative, both on the writing and art ends. Sort of like Bruce Willis, physically and from the way he carried himself. I learned a ton from him, about comic storytelling, writing cover blurbs, composition. We got on well. But toward the end, he was writing, what, 60% of the stories in the comics, and [with] that one style dominating, I felt the comics were getting stale".

=== Later career ===
DuBay wrote and drew a story for a 1983 issue of the anthological comics magazine Heavy Metal, and then became editor of Archie Comics' short-lived 1980s superhero line, in which he helped revive the company's 1940s characters, including the Black Hood and the Comet. He then edited the three-issue Pacific Comics superhero anthology Bold Adventure (Nov. 1983 – June 1984), and wrote the features "Anaconda" and "The Weirdling".

As he described his 1980s career in a mid-2000s interview,

I was editing several titles for Western [Publishing] (Popeye, Turok, Yosemite Sam and others), working on a title for Pacific Comics that would keep a few of my old Warren artists busy (Bold Adventure) and had teamed with two partners to open a new magazine company (Ion International) with the intent of producing Videogaming Illustrated and Chocolatier magazines, a couple of monthly newsstand titles. Carmine Infantino and I were also collaborating on several new ideas for DC [Comics], as well – one a title that company later used without us, Preacher. ... All this while still running my art studio, The Cartoon Factory.

In 1984, DuBay began a career in animation. That year, he was hired by Stan Lee to help build the animation studio Marvel Productions. Later, he and Rook co-creator Budd Lewis formed Time Castle Books to publish collections and planned graphic novels starring their character.

== Other ==
In the letters section of Fantastic Four No. 25 (April 1964), Dubay was awarded the first Marvel "No-Prize", for having the largest reported comic-book collection among Marvel Comics readers.

In 2003, DuBay was among 58 former Warren freelancers and editors who protested to Robert Fisher, the court-appointed trustee overseeing Warren Communications' involuntary Chapter 7 bankruptcy, that original artwork purchased by Harris Comics was not Warren's to sell.

== Personal life ==
DuBay was married to Peggy Buckler, sister of comic-book artist Rich Buckler. He had five children: Crystal, Lisa, Bill, Daniel, and Leina. Two months before his April 15, 2010, death in Portland, Oregon, DuBay married Venessa Hart.
