= Luis García Mozos =

Spanish comic book artist (born 1946)

Luis García
- Born: Luis García Mozos; January 10, 1946 Puertollano, Spain
- Area: artist
- Notable works: Creepy, Eerie, Vampirella
- Awards: Warren Award, 'Best Art in a Story', 1972

Luis García Mozos (born 1946) is a Spanish comic book artist.

== Career ==
A sample of Luis García's work, from Vampirella #42

=== Early career ===
More widely known in English as just Luis García, he was born in Puertollano, Spain in 1946. Garcia moved to Barcelona at the age of 10 to focus on his art and became an art apprentice at Editoria Bruguera at the age of 13. In 1961, he joined the well known Spanish agency Selecciones Illustradas and started drawing western and romance comics that were published in Britain. Six years later he joined a group of fellow artists Esteban Maroto, Ramon Torrents, Suso Pena and Adolfo Usero Abellan, who created the series 5 x Infinity.

=== Work for Warren Publishing ===
In 1971 García joined Warren Publishing, where he drew nine stories for Creepy, Eerie and Vampirella. García's first story published for Warren, The Men Who Called Him Monster (Creepy #43, January 1972) is notable as having the first interracial kiss in mainstream comics. Ironically this kiss, which occurred between a black detective and a white teenager he was interviewing happened only because the translator misunderstood the line "This is the clincher" in writer Don McGregor's script. Another story of García's, Welcome to the Witch's Coven (Vampirella #15, January 1972) won the Warren award for best art in a story for 1972.

After meeting artist Salvador Dalí in 1972, Garcia would bring his Warren work to René Goscinny, director of the French magazine Pilote where he was recruited to work for the magazine. Along with writer Víctor Mora, he created the series The Chronicles of the Nameless. Five of these stories would be reprinted, in rewritten form, in Vampirella in 1975 (Around the Corner... Just Beyond Eternity!, The Wolves at War's End, Love Strip, Janis and The Secret Legacy of Gaslight Lil!). The Wolves at War's End was rated as the second best story to ever appear in a Warren magazine by David A. Roach, co-author of The Warren Companion. Love Strip also appeared on his list in tenth place. The Wolves at War's End would later also be published in Heavy Metal under its original title and original storyline, The Winter of the Last Combat.

=== Later career ===
García's art would later appear in La Isla del Tesoro (1977), La Gran Aventura (1978), Etnocidio (1979) and Chicharras(1985). In 1980, Garcia would produce the series Nova 2, which focuses on a comic book artist's attempt to kill himself. The series would later be published in English in Heavy Metal magazine. Along with artists such as Jose Bea, Alfonso Font, Adolfo Usero Abellan and Carlos Giminez, he was one of the founders of the magazine Rambla. All of his co-founders except for Jose Bea would soon depart, but the magazine ran for 40 issues. After Rambla went out of business in 1985, García ended his career as a comic book artist to focus on painting.

== Selected bibliography ==
- Davy Crocket (1961)
- 5 Por Infinito (1968)
- Aventuras en la Selva (1969)
- Creepy issues 43,46,47 (1972)
- Eerie issues 41,43 (1972)
- Vampirella issues 15,17,18,20,21,42-45,47 (1972,1975)
- Pilote (1973–1980)
- La Isla del Tesoro (1977)
- La Gran Aventura (1978)
- Etnocidio (1979)
- Totem (1981)
- Nova 2 - Heavy Metal (1982)
- Rambla
- Chicharras (1985)

== Sources ==
- The Warren Companion, by David A. Roach and Jon B. Cooke
- Luis García publications in Pilote BDoubliées (in French)
