= Luis Bermejo =

Luis Bermejo may refer to:

- Luis Bermejo (illustrator)
- Luis Bermejo (actor)
- Luis Bermejo (priest)
