= Jaime Brocal Remohí =

Spanish comic book artist (1936–2002)

- Born: Jaime Brocal Remohí; June 11, 1936 Valencia, Spain
- Died: June 29, 2002 (aged 66) Valencia, Spain
- Area: artist
- Notable works: Creepy, Eerie

Jaime Brocal Remohí (June 11, 1936 – June 29, 2002; usually known in America as just Jaime Brocal) was a Spanish comic book artist.

== Career ==
Born in Valencia, Valencian Community, Spain, Brocal began his comic career at the age of 20, working of various adventure comics including Leslie Charteris' The Saint and an adaption of Jules Verne's From the Earth to the Moon. In 1960, at the age of 24, Brocal created the adventure series Katan and Ogan. Ten years later he would create the characters Kronan, Arcane and Ta-ar. He also worked on various hard cover books such as Gandhi, Lawrence of Arabia, The Jewish People and The History of Islam. He would later produce illustrations for Planeta DeAgostini. He would also work for Japanese company Kodansha, drawing the series Kami no Ude (神の腕; lit. 'Arm of God') for Monthly Afternoon in 1993, as well as stories with Leslie Charteris' The Saint for the Swedish market and Tarzan for German publisher Ehapa.

Due to his connections with Selecciones Ilustradas, Brocal joined American company Warren Publishing, as one of the first Spanish artists to work in their magazines, premiering in the 34th issue of Eerie in July 1971. Brocal drew 16 stories for Warren from 1971 through 1974. While at Warren he drew multiple recurring characters including 'Targos' and 'The Mummy', one of the first continuing series published in Eerie. In 1991, together with Antonio Segura, he created the series El otro Necronomicón ("The Other Necronomicon") for the Spanish version of Creepy; it included seven short horror stories inspired by H. P. Lovecraft's world of creations.

== Selected bibliography ==
- The Saint
- From Earth to Moon
- Katan
- Ogan
- Cronan
- Arcane
- Ta-ar
- Gandhi
- Lawrence of Arabia
- The Jewish People
- The History of Islam
- Kami no Ude
- Creepy (issues 43, 45, 49, 57)
- Eerie (issues 34, 37–39, 47–50, 52–54)

== Sources ==
- Roach, David A.; Cooke, Jon B. The Warren Companion.
