= Darklon =

Darklon may refer to

- Darklon the Mystic, a comic book character created by Jim Starlin for Eerie magazine in 1976.
- Darklon, a G.I. Joe: A Real American Hero character who is an officer in the Iron Grenadiers, a line of toys produced in 1988.
