= Ramon Torrents =

Spanish comic artist

- Born: 6 December 1937 (age 88) Barcelona, Spain
- Area: artist
- Notable works: Creepy, Eerie, Vampirella

Ramón Torrents (born 6 December 1937) is a Spanish comic book artist.

== Career ==
Ramón Torrents was born in Barcelona, Catalonia, northern Spain. He began his career drawing for the comic Space Ace. He later worked on romance comics for British publisher Fleetway, including Marilyn and True Life Library. In the late 1960s, Torrents worked with Esteban Maroto in the Spanish science fiction series Cinco x Infinito.

Through his connections with agency Selecciones Ilustradas, Torrents began working for American company Warren Publishing in 1972. For them, he drew 42 stories until 1979. The majority of his work appeared in Vampirella, with 8 stories done for Creepy and one story done for Eerie. Torrents drew primarily stand-alone stories except for a three part series titled Fleur and a single story where he drew Vampirella herself. Torrents also worked for Warren competitor Skywald for a period of time in the early 1970s. After leaving Warren, Torrents retired from the comic book industry.

A sample of Ramon Torrent's work, from Vampirella #57.

== Bibliography ==
Interior art includes:

- Creepy #51-53, 57, 59, 65, 92
- Eerie #50, 81, 133,
- Vampirella #23-26, 28–29, 35–36, 40, 44, 47–48, 49, 52, 57–58, 61–63, 67–68, 70, 76

== Sources ==
- Roach, David A.; Cooke, Jon B. The Warren Companion.
