= Félix Mas =

Spanish artist (born 1935)

Felix Mas
- Born: Felix Mas; 1935 (age 90–91) Barcelona
- Area: artist
- Notable works: Creepy, Vampirella

Félix Mas (born 1935) is a Spanish comic book artist and fine artist.

== Career ==
Félix Mas was born in Barcelona, northern Spain. He studied art at Saint Jordi and joined the military, where he stayed until 1957. After leaving the military he joined the Spanish art agency Seleciones Illustrada and started working for various romance comics for companies like Fleetway and Valentine. He also drew the detective story Lt. Kane for T.V. Heroes. During the 1960s Mas worked in Scandinavia as an illustrator. He returned to comics in 1969 with D.C. Thomson's Romeo.

Mas was hired by American company Warren Publishing in 1972: he subsequently drew a total of 17 horror stories for their magazines Creepy and Vampirella until January 1975. The story "The Vampiress Stalks the Castle at Night" from Vampirella #21 was included within a list of the top 25 Warren stories in the book The Warren Companion by David Roach. After leaving Warren, Mas moved to Venezuela and stopped his comic work, choosing instead to focus on painting. He would later move to Florida.

== Selected bibliography ==
- Lt. Kane
- Romeo
- Creepy (issues 43, 45, 46, 50–52)
- Vampirella (issues 16, 18, 21–24, 34–36, 38, 39)

== Sources ==
- Roach, David A.; Cooke, Jon B. The Warren Companion.
