= Angelo Torres =

Puerto Rican cartoonist

- Born: April 14, 1932 (age 94) Santurce, Puerto Rico
- Areas: Penciller, Inker
- Awards: Inkpot Award (2000)

Angelo Torres (born April 14, 1932, in Santurce, Puerto Rico) is an American cartoonist and caricaturist whose work has appeared in many noteworthy comic books, as well as a long-running regular illustrator for Mad.

== EC Comics ==
Torres was friends with artist Al Williamson in the early 1950s and occasionally assisted him on work for EC Comics with fellow artists Frank Frazetta and Roy Krenkel (known as the Fleagle Gang). The story which was to be Torres' first solo EC story, "An Eye for an Eye" in Incredible Science Fiction #33 (Jan.-Feb. 1956), was rejected by the Comics Code and did not see print for the first time until 1971.

== Atlas Comics ==
When the EC comics line ended after the enforcement of the Comics Code, Torres (and several other EC alumni) went to Atlas Comics (later to be known as the Marvel Comics Group) and drew a number of short stories for their mystery titles in 1956-57, titles such as Astonishing, Spellbound, Uncanny Tales, Marvel Tales and many others.

== Warren Publishing ==
Torres later worked for Warren Publishing under editor Archie Goodwin. He contributed art on 20 stories for Creepy, Eerie and Blazing Combat from 1964 through 1967.

== Mad Magazine ==
From October 1969 until April 2005 he drew the satires of contemporary U.S. television shows (and later movies) as the penultimate feature in Mad magazine (whereas Mort Drucker drew the movie parodies in its opening portions).

He was named #61 in Atomic Comics' (retailer) list of The Top 100 Artists of American Comic Books.

== Recent work ==
Torres drew five "what if?"-pseudo-covers for comic historian Grant Geissman's book The History of EC Comics, appearing in the end of the book, under the general guideline, " what if the anti-comics crusade which took down EC and countless competitors had been able to survive the McCarthy Era censorship assault, and EC had asked Torres to illustrate its covers?"

== Society of Illustrators Museum of Illustration Exhibition ==
For his 90th birthday, The Society of Illustrators in New York City fêted Torres with a comprehensive exhibition of his vast body of work: "What, Me PANIC? Celebrating Angelo Torres" from May 11 through September 3, 2022 with several hundred never-before-seen pieces of original art from his tenure with EC, Marvel, Warren, MAD and more, photos, comics, magazines and memorabilia. Robert L. Reiner curated the show with assistance from Clint Morgan, who also designed the exhibition program (https://societyillustrators.org/shop/books-media/si-publications/signed-what-me-panic-celebrating-angelo-torres-exhibition-catalog), and the filmmakers Ian Scott McGregor and Will Mayo produced a short documentary - My Dinner with Angelo - interviewing and revisiting the career of Angelo Torres (https://www.youtube.com/watch?v=eycPHlNU_48)

== The Unwanted by Otto Binder ==
Angelo Torres provided layouts and pencils for a "new work" by the late Otto Binder (1911-1974). Adapted by Robert L. Reiner, the story was written in 1953 and was previously unpublished. Stefan Koidl, a Salzburg-based sculptor and master digital artist provided finishing art. Titled, "The Unwanted," the story is a parable where a society learns to be careful what it wishes for and to understand what it means to be unwanted. Fantagraphics is the publisher.

== Bibliography ==
Page four of "Savage World" (Al Williamson with Torres, Krenkel and Frazetta), from Alien Worlds issue #4

Comics work includes:

- Piracy #1-2 (inks, EC Comics, Oct/Nov 1954)
- Creepy #1-5, 7, 10-13 (Warren Publishing, 1964–1966)
- Eerie #2,3,5,6,8 (Warren Publishing, 1965–1966)
- Mad #130-213, 288, 300 (October 1968-March 1980, December 1988, January 1991)
- Horror From The Tomb 1954

== Sources ==
- Angelo Torres at the Grand Comics Database
- Angelo Torres at the Comic Book DB (archived from the original)
- Lambiek: Angelo Torres
