= Russ Jones =

Canadian writer

- Born: July 16, 1942 (age 84) Ontario, Canada
- Areas: Cartoonist, Writer, Inker, Editor
- Pseudonym: Jack Younger
- Notable works: Creepy

Russ Jones's painting of Lon Chaney, Sr. in London After Midnight.

Russ Jones (born July 16, 1942, in Ontario) is a Canadian novelist, illustrator, and magazine editor, active in the publishing and entertainment industries over a half-century, best known as the creator of the magazine Creepy for Warren Publishing. As the founding editor of Creepy in 1963, he is notable for a significant milestone in comics history by proving there was a readership eager to read graphic stories in a black-and-white magazine format rather than in a color comic book.

During the mid-1960s, Jones also pioneered the presentation of original comics formatted directly for paperback books, such as Christopher Lee's Treasury of Terror (Pyramid, 1966).

== Comics and graphic novels ==
While in the Marine Corps, Jones worked on Leatherneck magazine. Arriving in New York, he teamed with Wally Wood and Joe Orlando on several comics-related projects, some for Warren Publishing. Jones drew and scripted comic book stories for a variety of publishers, including Marvel, Seaboard, Gold Key, and Charlton. He penciled DC Comics' Mystery in Space, and his slick brush inking provided a polish to many DC romance comics, some inked in collaboration with Bhob Stewart. Jones and Stewart also teamed on scripts and art for Charlton Comics' Ghostly Tales. Jones teamed with penciler Jay Scott Pike as inker on DC's Heart Throbs for the long-running feature "3 Girls—Their Lives—Their Loves," which ran from 1966 to 1970.

Russ Jones Productions' Dracula (Ballantine Books, 1966) was an adaptation of Bram Stoker's tale into a graphic novel illustrated by Alden McWilliams with text by Otto Binder and Craig Tennis. In addition to other story adaptations for Jones, Tennis later wrote the book Johnny Tonight about his experiences as a talent coordinator working with Johnny Carson and The Tonight Show.

Among other published paintings, Jones did the covers for Famous Monsters of Filmland #30 and its short-lived sister magazine's Monster World #1 (both 1964)

== Magazines ==
In the years following Creepy, Jones founded and edited several other popular culture magazines, including Monster Mania. His magazine Flashback, co-edited with Stewart, employed an unusual approach to the coverage of Hollywood's past by devoting an entire issue to the films of a specific year. A series of front covers by Jack Davis caricatured famed scenes from classic cinema. Humphrey Bogart cradling Woody Woodpecker, rather than the falcon statue of The Maltese Falcon, was the Davis cover for the issue on the films of 1941.

== Novels ==
Jones wrote more than two dozen paperback novels under the name Jack Younger and other pseudonyms. Devlin (Manor Books, 1976), with Kennedy-like characters, carries the blurb, "They were the most powerful family on Earth—but was that power spawned in hell?" Younger also is the byline on Maniac! (Manor, 1977), Demon (Carlyle, 1979) and Claw (Manor, 1976), a tale of vicious cats, as noted in the back cover blurb:

Beware the cats!
From out of nowhere, thousands of cats swarmed through the remote summer resort. They were considered only a nuisance at first-until they suddenly went crazy. In the beginning, they preyed on only the young, the aged, the helpless. But as their numbers grew, they began attacking anyone-anywhere-without fear. They kept on coming, relishing the taste of human blood. The town was surrounded; isolated from the mainland. Those who had survived the deadly onslaught huddled together for protection-waiting for help... waiting for an answer... waiting... if only for death...

His work as an illustrator was displayed on front and back covers for Castle of Frankenstein and other magazines. His paintings were also seen in the feature film, The Salton Sea (2002).
