= Michael Woods (comics) =

Writer and editor of comic books

Michael Woods is a writer and editor of comic books. His published work include Creepy (Dark Horse Comics), Eisner and Harvey award nominated anthology Outlaw Territory (Image Comics) and the Eisner and Harvey Award-winning anthology Popgun (Image).
