= Blazing Combat =

- Blazing Combat #3 (April 1966). Cover art by Frank Frazetta

Publication information
- Publisher: Warren Publishing
- Schedule: Quarterly
- Format: Ongoing series
- Genre: War
- Publication date: October 1965 to July 1966
- No. of issues: 4

Creative team
- Written by: Archie Goodwin
- Artist(s): Reed Crandall, Gene Colan; Frank Frazetta, Russ Heath; Joe Orlando, John Severin; Angelo Torres, Alex Toth; Al Williamson, Wally Wood

Blazing Combat was an American war-comics magazine published quarterly by Warren Publishing from 1965 to 1966. Written and edited by Archie Goodwin, with artwork by such industry notables as Gene Colan, Frank Frazetta, John Severin, Alex Toth, and Wally Wood, it featured war stories in both contemporary and period settings, unified by a humanistic theme of the personal costs of war, rather than by traditional men's-adventure motifs.

== Publication history ==
Following the success of Warren Publishing's black-and-white horror-comics magazine Creepy in 1964, publisher James Warren expanded into war fiction the following year with the short-lived Blazing Combat. The black-and-white, 64-page Blazing Combat ran four quarterly issues, cover-dated October 1965 to July 1966, and, like Creepy, carried a 35-cent cover price.

Warren was inspired by the humanistic drama in editor Harvey Kurtzman's EC Comics titles Frontline Combat (1951-1954) and Two-Fisted Tales (1950-1955), saying in 1999, "I thought what Harvey had done for [EC publisher] Bill Gaines should have separated in some way from the EC horror comics. Harvey's early work was the inspiration for Blazing Combat. I told Harvey Blazing Combat editorial was not going to be pro-war or blood and guts. It was going to be anti-war...." Despite that inspiration, Kurtzman, at the time editor of Warren's satirical magazine Help!, was not involved with Blazing Combat. The magazine's editor, Archie Goodwin, recalled that,

The first time I met Kurtzman, I had just started doing Blazing Combat, and Warren had just decided to cancel Help!. So I was saying, "Gee, I'm really sorry. Did Warren discuss with you why he was canceling it?" And Kurtzman said, "Well, I guess, you know, 'cause he'd rather do the kind of stuff you guys are doing."

Goodwin wrote all but one of the series' 29 stories, co-writing two with each story's respective artist. The generally six- to eight-page tales were illustrated by such EC war-story veterans as John Severin, Wally Wood — two of the primary Frontline Combat contributors — George Evans, Russ Heath, and Alex Toth, as well as by EC horror/sci-fi artists Reed Crandall and Joe Orlando. Other illustrators included Gene Colan, Al Williamson, Gray Morrow, and Angelo Torres. All four covers were paintings by Frank Frazetta.

"Give and Take", from issue #4, took artist Russ Heath six weeks to draw, using himself as the model for every member of the squad of soldiers. While most stories took place during World War II, the settings ranged from the Persian Wars to the present day. Some dealt with historical figures, such as American Revolutionary War general Benedict Arnold and his pre-traitorous victory at the Battle of Saratoga (issue #2, Jan. 1966), while "Foragers" (issue #3, April 1966) focused on a fictitious soldier in General William T. Sherman's devastating March to the Sea during the American Civil War. "Holding Action" (issue #2), set on the last day of the Korean War, ended with a gung-ho young soldier, unwilling to quit, being escorted over his protests into a medical vehicle. The final panel leaves ambiguous whether the trauma will be temporary or lasting.

The most controversial stories were set during the contemporary Vietnam War, particularly "Landscape" (issue #2), which follows the thoughts of a Vietnamese peasant rice-farmer devoid of ideology, who nonetheless becomes a civilian casualty. Warren said the story caused key distributors to stop selling the title.

=== Early cancellation ===
The premiere issue of Blazing Combat reached newsstands in mid-1965, during a troop-escalation period years before American public sentiment would turn against the Vietnam War. Publisher James Warren said that, from the beginning, wholesale magazine distributors cautioned him that the magazine's anti-war stance presented a sales obstacle. As Warren recalled in a 1999 interview, "[H]ere is my distributor, saying, 'Uh oh! Wait until our wholesalers — many of them belonging to the American Legion — see this!' They found out very fast that it was anti-war".

Warren said the second issue's Vietnam-set story "Landscape", by writer Goodwin and artist Orlando, solidified wholesalers' stance against the magazine. According to Warren, the American Legion began a campaign to let the magazine sit on distributor shelves rather than be sent to the buying public. The armed forces, which were at the time a major purchaser of B&W comic magazines, began to refuse to sell Blazing Combat on their bases or PXs, due to its perceived anti-war stance.

Warren said in 1999 that

...the Army PXs' refusal to carry Blazing Combat didn't kill it. That wasn't the death knell, but it told me the magazine would never make it on the newsstands. I was prepared to carry Blazing Combat and lose $2,000 an issue on it. ... Then the loss hit $4,000 for one issue. One of the reasons it dipped so low was because the PXs wouldn't take #4 (Army PXs were a big chunk of our business) and wholesalers were returning bundles unopened, along with nasty letters to me. This was beginning to reflect on the other books. In effect, they said, 'If Warren Publishing is turning out this unpatriotic crap, we don't want any of their other books!' ... The official documentation was their monthly order form from [the PXs], which listed 'zero copies ordered' for next month's Blazing Combat.

In a 1993 interview, Warren said that distributors generally did not communicate with him as to why the series was not selling:

And the story that I got back was that the American Legion, which was very much gung ho for Vietnam or any conflict involving American boys at that time, looked on us and saw us as traitors to our own country And I think that happened with the second issue. The sales were terrible. They were terrible with the third and, of course, they were terrible with the fourth.

And no one would tell me the truth. Our national distributor didn't care enough to delve into it. The people who were responsible didn't have the courage to write me a letter, or telephone me, or tell me to my face at the conventions I attended — the distributing conventions or whatever — that I was un-American and that I was doing a shameful thing. It was done sub rosa. That's about the way it happened.

== Critical assessment ==
Critic Jason Sacks, in his review of the book The Warren Companion, refers to Blazing Combat as "the finest war comics since the EC days", while comic-book historian Richard Arndt assesses Blazing Combat as, "Probably the best war comic ever published". Writer and critic Steve Stiles, in an overview of writer-editor Archie Goodwin's career, said, "The stories were both gritty and realistic ... showing the true horror of war".

== Reprints ==
- Blazing Combat (Warren Publishing, 1978) ISBN 84-85138-26-0

Trade paperback reprinting 17 black-and-white stories and all four color covers

- Cover of Creepy #89 (June 1977)

Cover of Blazing Combat #1 (This issue of the horror anthology contained war stories)

- Creepy #139 (July 1982)

"Survival" (Blazing Combat #3): Art by Alex Toth

- Creepy #142 (Oct. 1982)

"Night Drop!" (Blazing Combat #4): Art by Angelo Torres
"Kasserine Pass" (Blazing Combat #2): Art by Angelo Torres & Al Williamson

- Blazing Combat: Vietnam and Korea (1993), #1–2 (Apple Comics)

Reprints of Blazing Combat stories set in Vietnam and Korea.

- Blazing Combat: World War I and World War II (1994), #1–2 (Apple Comics)

Reprints of Blazing Combat stories set during the two World Wars.

- Blazing Combat (Fantagraphics Books, 2009) ISBN 1-56097-965-8

Hardcover reprinting all four issues in their entirety
