= Fernando Fernández (comics) =

Spanish comic book artist (1940–2010)

- Born: 7 February 1940 Barcelona, Spain
- Died: 9 August 2010 (aged 70) Barcelona, Spain
- Area: artist

Fernando Fernández (7 February 1940 – 9 August 2010) was a Spanish comic book artist.

== Biography ==
The final page from Rendezvous, Vampirella #35.

Fernández was born in Barcelona. In 1956, aged 16, he joined the Spanish agency Selecciones Ilustradas. From 1958 through 1964 Fernandez worked on war comics (including Air Ace and War Picture Library) and romance comics (including Valentine, Roxy and Marilyn) for British publishers. He also painted covers for paperbacks and picture libraries like Commando and Chiller. Fernández left the comics industry for a period of time in the 1960s, returning in 1970. He drew the strip Mosca from 1970 to 1973.

Fernández started working for Warren Publishing in 1973 due to his connections with Selecciones Illustradas. Unlike many of the Spanish artists from S.I., Fernández both wrote and drew his stories. During his period with Warren from 1973 to 1975 a total of 11 of these stories were made, all of which were published in Vampirella (issues 28–32, 35–6, 40–3). The story Rendezvous (issue 35) was included in a list of the top 25 Warren stories of all time in the book The Warren Companion by author David A. Roach. Fernandez won a Warren Award in 1975 for Best Artist/Writer on the story Goodbye My Love, Goodbye (issue 41). An additional story written by Fernandez, but drawn by Jose Miralles appeared in issue 57 of Vampirella in 1977. Warren would later reprint three additional Fernandez stories originally done in Spain in Eerie in 1978 (issue 94), 1980 (issue 117) and 1981 (issue 118).

After Warren, Fernández worked on French educational comics for Afha, as well as the Cuando el Comic es Arte series for Jose Toutain. He also worked on the series Circulos in 1979 and Zora y los Hibernautas in 1980, which would later be reprinted in the U.S. in the magazine Heavy Metal. In 1982 he drew the comic version of Bram Stoker's Dracula for the Spanish edition of Creepy. He adapted Isaac Asimov stories in 1983 for the book Firmado por: Isaac Asimov, and collaborated with Carlos Trillo to create the medieval fantasy La Leyenda de las Cuatro Sombras for Zona 84.

He would later adapt Asimov again with Lucky Star in 1989. Fernández eventually left the comics field in the 1990s to focus exclusively on painting.

== Selected bibliography ==
- Vampirella issues 28–32, 35–36, 40–43 (1973–1975)
- Eerie issues 94, 117, 118 (1978, 1980–1981)
- Circulows (1979)
- Zora (1980)
- Firmado Por: Isaac Asimov (1983)
- Heavy Metal (1984)
- Lucky Star (1989)

== Sources ==
- The Warren Companion, by David A. Roach and Jon B. Cooke
