= Isidro Monés =

Spanish comic book artist (born 1947)

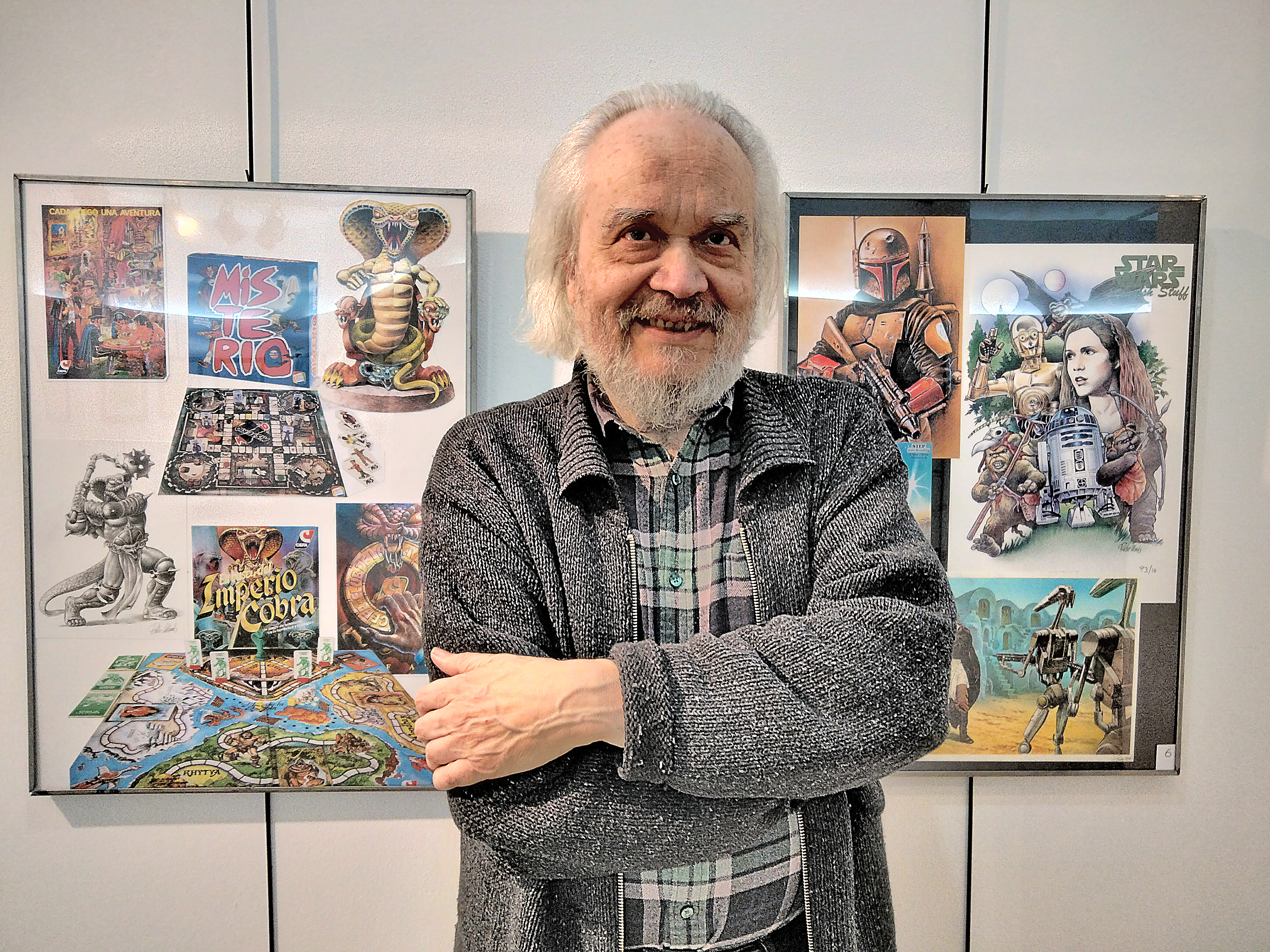
- Born: Isidre Monés; May 31, 1947 (age 79) Barcelona, Spain
- Area: artist
- Pseudonyms: Isidro Mones, Munes
- Notable works: Creepy, Eerie, Vampirella

Isidre Monés Pons, also Isidro Monés (born 1947) is a Spanish comic book artist.

== Career ==
A sample of Isidro Mones's work, from Eerie #56.

Isidro Monés was born in Barcelona, Catalunya. He started his career as an artist doing children's books, covers and trading cards. He joined the agency Selecciones Illustrada in the early 1970s and started drawing for Warren Publishing in 1973. He was miscredited as 'Munes' in his early stories at Warren. At Warren he would do a number of horror stories for all three of Warren's horror magazines, Creepy, Eerie, and Vampirella. His work included the art for the series Dr. Archaeus, which ran in Eerie #54-61, as well as the art for a number of story adaptions including The Golden Kris of Hadji Mohammed by Frederick Moore, and "Oil of Dog" by Ambrose Bierce.

Monés would leave Warren in 1976 and appeared in Commando and Bullet in Britain. He returned to Warren briefly in 1979, where he would draw the series Götterdämmerung in Eerie as well as a number of stand alone stories. He departed Warren once more, but would return for one final story in 1982 shortly before Warren's bankruptcy.

His work in Bruguera books, advertising, SF comic and Spanish pulp is huge and continues working.

== Selected bibliography ==
- Creepy issues 56–58,62,66,67,70,77,81,106,117,118,143
- Eerie issues 49,50,52,54-58,60,61,94,100,101
- Vampirella issues 26,28-30,33,38,43,49,75-77
