= José Beá =

Spanish comic book artist (born 1942)

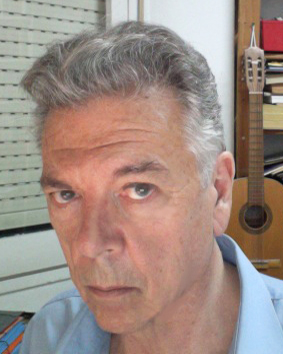
- José Beá
- Born: Josep Maria Beà i Font; 1942 (age 83–84) Spain
- Area: artist
- Pseudonyms: Sanchez Zamora, Norton
- Notable works: Creepy, Eerie, Vampirella

Josep Maria Beà i Font, in Spanish José Beá (born 11 March 1942) is a Spanish comic book artist.

== Career ==
Born in Barcelona, Catalunya, Beá joined the art agency Selecciones Ilustradas at 15 and started his comic book career in the late 1950s when he worked for Fleetway in Britain. He also worked on Miller's TV Heroes during this period. In the early 1960s he worked on Space Ace for Atlas, as well as Lone Star. He also worked on various British romance comics including Romeo, Mirabelle, Valentine and Jackie. In 1962 Beá moved to Paris where he focused on painting rather than comic book art. Bea returned to comics in 1970 for the publication Dracula from Buru Lan, where he first started writing his own stories. His work for Dracula included the series Sir Leo as well as several stand-alone stories.

Due to his connections with the Spanish agency Selecciones Illustrada, Beá started working for Warren Publishing in America in 1971, premiering with the story The Silver Thief and the Pharaoh's Daughter in Vampirella 13. Bea would both write and illustrate a large portion of his stories. Stories highlighted for praise by comics historian Richard Arndt included Picture of Death (Creepy 45), The Accursed Flower (Creepy 49), Quavering Shadows (Vampirella 15) and The Other Side of Heaven (Vampirella 28). Eerie publish three parts from his Tales of Peter Hypnos series, which had also been published in Spirit in Spain and in Australia. His work for Dracula was reprinted in a separate book published by Warren, as well as his story Invasion in Eerie 75. Beá would draw approximately thirty stories for Warren and two covers, one of which was actually an enlarged and colorized panel from one of his stories.

After his departure from Warren in 1976, Beá worked on Tales of the Galactic Inn. He would also produce work for satirist humor magazines such as El Papus, Muchas Gracias, El Vibora, Eh! and Por Favor. In 1979 he was convicted for offenses against morality for the content of one of his stories in Tales of the Galactic Inn, and was forbidden from doing anymore artwork. Once this ban was lifted, he co-founded the magazine Rambla with Luis Garcia, acting as Publisher and Editor, and working under both his own name and the alias Sanchez Zamora. After Rambla went out of business, he would found his own publishing company, Intermagen which republished various works of his as well as producing various humor magazines.

In 1989 he made the television series Doctor Vapor, teacher inventor, composed of 26 chapters of 3 minutes. It was "a kind of inventions of the TBO in which he devised strange gadgets" and was broadcast exclusively in the PLàstic program of the TV3. Other projects, such as the adaptation of their galactic tavern stories, did not come to fruition.

== Selected bibliography ==
A sample of Jose Bea's work, from Creepy #45.

- Miller's TV Heroes
- Space Ace
- Lone Star
- Dracula issues 1-5, 7-12 (1971)
- Marilyn (1971)
- Creepy issues 44-47, 49-53,56-58,61,80 (1972–1976)
- Eerie issues 39-41,72,73,75,76 (1972–1976)
- Vampirella issues 13,15,17,22,23,25,26,28,31,34,36 (1971–1974)
- Tales of the Galactic Inn
- Rambla

== Sources ==
- Roach, David A.; Cooke, Jon B. The Warren Companion.
