= Carlos Giménez (comics) =

Spanish artist and writer (born 1941)

Carlos Giménez (born 6 March 1941) is a Spanish comics artist.

== Biography ==
Giménez was born in Madrid. His father, a welder, died shortly after his birth, and subsequently Giménez lived for years in an orphanage.

Aged 17, he showed his drawings to Manuel López Blanco, who hired him as assistant for his works for Ibergraf agency. After 1962, he shared a studio with Esteban Maroto and Adolfo Usero, executing war stories for Editorial Maga and the series Buck Jones. After a period working for the Selecciones Illustradas agency at Barcelona, in 1963 Giménez launched El Gringo, a western series, for Toutain; for the same publisher he also worked to several romantic comics books.

In 1967-1968 he worked at Delta 99, a science fiction series, and produced several humour stories for the German market (Tom Berry and Kiko 2000). The following year, Giménez began his first famous series, Dani Futuro, with script by Víctor Mora: initially appearing in the magazine Gaceta Junior, it lasted until 1975 after moving to the Belgian magazine Tintin in 1972.

In 1975 Giménez began the autobiographical series Paracuellos for the magazine Muchas Gracias, as well as a series about the first years of democratic government in Spain, which were later collected in the albums España Una..., España Grande... and España Libre!. Together with Alfonso Font and Adolfo Usero (as Premia 78), in 1978 he started the Dossieres Mystère series in the magazine Pif. His other series of this period include the conclusion of the erotic series Ulysses for the German magazine Pip, Hom (an adaptation of Brian W. Aldiss' science fiction novel The Long Afternoon of Earth) and Koulau el Leproso (an adaptation of the short story "Koolau the Leper" by Jack London). He also contributed to the satirical weekly magazine El Papus.

In 1980 he began Érase una vez el futuro ("Once Upon a Time in the Future", also based on a Jack London story) for the Spanish version of 1984; for the same magazine Giménez produced Diarios de las estrellas, based on Stanislaw Lem's work. In 1982 Giménez launched his most famous series, Los profesionales, depicting the economical background and personal deeds of people producing comics in Spain.

In 1989 he published the first of the 51 Historias de sexo y chapuza, short stories without a fixed character, about the use of sex and erotism in creative. His later works include Bandolero (1987); Une Enfance Éternelle' (1991, script by Christian Godard), and Jonás, la isla que nunca existió (1992-2003), the latter published directly in the Internet, the adaptation of El capitán Alatriste (2005, with art by Joan Mundet) and 36-39. Malos tiempos, set during the Spanish Civil War (2007-2008). His last work is a biography of Spanish comics artist José González.

In 2016 "Paracuellos" was published for the first time in English in the United States by IDW Publishing's EuroComics imprint.

== Sources ==
- Martín Martínez, Antonio (1982). Carlos Giménez. Un hombre, mil imágenes. Norma Editorial.
- "Carlos Giménez: Historia viva del cómic español". www.akiracomics.com.
- "Carlos Giménez Giménez". www.revista.tebeosfera.com.
