= Warren Publishing =

American magazine company

- Industry: Comics
- Founded: 1957; 69 years ago
- Founder: James Warren
- Defunct: 1983; 43 years ago
- Headquarters: Philadelphia, Pennsylvania, then New York City, New York

Warren Publishing was an American magazine company founded by James Warren, who published his first magazines in 1957 and continued in the business for decades. Magazines published by Warren include After Hours, Creepy, Eerie, Famous Monsters of Filmland, Help!, and Vampirella.

Initially based in Philadelphia, Pennsylvania, the company moved by 1965 to New York City.

== Publishing history ==
=== Founding ===
Vampirella #1 (Sept. 1969). Cover art by Frank Frazetta.

Begun by James Warren, Warren Publishing's initial publications were the horror-fantasy--science fiction movie magazine Famous Monsters of Filmland and Monster World, both edited by Forrest J Ackerman. Warren soon published Spacemen magazine and in 1960 Help! magazine, with the first employee of the magazine being Gloria Steinem.

After introducing what he called "Monster Comics" in Monster World, Warren expanded in 1964 with horror-comics stories in the sister magazines Creepy and Eerie – black-and-white publications in a standard magazine format, rather than comic-book size, and selling for 35 cents as opposed to the standard comic-book price of 12 cents. Such a format, Warren explained, averted the restrictions of the Comics Code Authority, the comic-book industry's self-censorship body:

The Comics Code saved the industry from turmoil, but at the same time, it had a cleansing kind of effect on comics, making them "clean, proper and family-oriented" ... We would overcome this by saying to the Code Authority, the industry, the printers, and the distributors: 'We are not a comic book; we are a magazine. Creepy is magazine-sized and will be sold on magazine racks, not comic book racks". Creepy's manifesto was brief and direct: First, it was to be a magazine format, 8½" × 11", going to an older audience not subject to the Code Authority."

By publishing graphic stories in a magazine format to which the Code did not apply, Warren paved the way for such later graphic-story magazines as the American version of Heavy Metal; Marvel Comics' Epic Illustrated; and Psycho and other series from Skywald Publications.

Russ Jones was the founding editor of Creepy in 1964. A year later, Archie Goodwin succeeded him, with Joe Orlando acting as a behind-the-scenes story editor. Goodwin, who would become one of comics' foremost and most influential writers, helped to establish the company as a leader in its field. From 1965 to 1966, Warren also published the four-issue Blazing Combat, a war-comics magazine with anti-war themes, controversial at the time.

=== Vampirella and international artists ===
After 17 issues of Creepy and 11 of Eerie, Goodwin resigned as editor in 1967. The movement of Warren's operations from Philadelphia to New York City, combined with a change in distributors and a downturn in the market imposed a cash flow problem on Warren, and Goodwin along with all of the artists except for Tom Sutton and Rocke Mastroserio (who soon died) departed the company.

During the next two-and-a-half years, Warren's publications consisted primarily of reprints from the early issues. During this period, a variety of editors ran the magazines including Bill Parente, Nicola Cuti, and Warren himself. Things started picking up again for Warren in 1969 with the premiere of its third horror magazine, Vampirella. Many of Warren's original artists returned during this period, as would Goodwin for a period of time in 1970 and 1971. After Goodwin's second departure, editors would include J.R. Cochran. The art director was Billy Graham.

In 1971, Warren began using artists from the Barcelona studio of Spanish agency Selecciones Illustrada. Over the next few years, Spanish artists would dominate the magazines. Additional Spanish artists from S.I.'s Valencia studio began freelancing for Warren in 1974.

In 1973, new editor Bill DuBay, who had originally joined the company as an artist early in 1970, transformed Warren's magazines to create a uniform style. The following year, Warren Publishing was dissolved and replaced by Warren Communications, a sister company James Warren had founded in 1972. Dubay was editor for all three of Warren's horror magazines until 1976, except for a short period of time in 1974 where Goodwin returned to edit four issues of Creepy and two of Vampirella. During this time, the frequency of Warren's magazines was increased to nine issues a year.

=== Line expansion in the 1970s ===
In 1974, DuBay oversaw a new black-and-white magazine, The Spirit, which revived acclaimed writer-artist Will Eisner's masked detective of 1940s and early-1950s newspaper Sunday supplements, reprinting the character's seven-page, semi-anthological stories for a new generation. The magazine featured new covers by Eisner and an occasional reprint in color.( The Spirit would later move to Kitchen Sink Press.) The same year, Warren debuted Comix International, a color magazine reprinting earlier Warren stories.

After Dubay's departure, Louise Jones, his former assistant, headed the editorial staff from 1976 to 1980. Toward the end of Dubay's period of editorship many American artists had returned to the magazines, including John Severin, Alex Toth, and Russ Heath and they contributed many stories during Jones' time as editor. Former DC Comics publisher Carmine Infantino would also join the company during this period and pencil over 50 stories. Much like the wave of Spanish artists that dominated throughout the mid-1970s, a number of artists from the Philippines would begin contributing during this period. Dubay returned as editor after Jones' departure, using the alias "Will Richardson".

Toward the end of the 1970s, Warren published two new magazines edited by Dubay: the science-fiction anthology 1984, in 1978 (which would change its name to 1994 two years later); and, in 1979, The Rook, starring a time-traveling adventurer whose stories had appeared in Eerie since 1977.

=== Decline and bankruptcy ===
James Warren's bad health, combined with changing tastes and business problems, led to internal turmoil and editorial turnover. The company suspended publishing in late 1981, editor Bill Dubay left in 1982, and Warren declared bankruptcy in 1983. In August 1983, Harris Publications acquired company assets at auction, and published new and reprinted Vampirella comics; Creepy #146 (Summer 1985), continuing the numbering of the original series and containing both new and reprinted material, Creepy: The Limited Series, a four-issue miniseries of new stories; and other Warren-related comics. A 1998 lawsuit by James Warren resulted in his reacquisition of the rights to Creepy and Eerie. Dark Horse Comics began issuing reprints with the ongoing licensed series Creepy Archives in 2008, and began publishing new material with Creepy vol. 2 in 2009 and Eerie vol. 2 in 2012.

== Artists and writers ==
Creepy #22 (Aug. 1968), cover art by Tom Sutton.

Illustrators included such established artists as Orlando, Neal Adams, Gene Colan, Frank Frazetta, Angelo Torres, Roy G. Krenkel, Gray Morrow, Al Williamson, Johnny Craig, Reed Crandall, Alex Toth, John Severin, Russ Heath and Wally Wood, plus a newer group of talents, including Dan Adkins, Richard Bassford, Roger Brand, Frank Brunner, Rich Buckler, Dave Cockrum, Nicola Cuti, Richard Corben, Ken Kelly, Pepe Moreno, Mike Royer, Tom Sutton, and Berni Wrightson.

The Spanish artists from Selecciones Ilustradas included Esteban Maroto, José Ortiz, Luis Bermejo, Rafael Aura Leon, Luis Garcia, Jose Gonzalez, Isidro Mones, Martin Salvador, Fernando Fernandez, Leopold Sanchez, Ramon Torrents, Jose Bea, Vicente Alcazar, Jose Gual, Felix Mas and Jaime Brocal. Artists from the Philippines included Alex Niño, Rudy Nebres, Alfredo Alcala and Abel Laxamana. Other international artists who worked for Warren include Gonzalo Mayo (Peru), Pablo Marcos (Peru), Leo Duranona (Argentina) and Paul Neary (U.K.).

Cover artists for Creepy, Eerie and Vampirella included Adkins, Frazetta, Kelly, Morrow, Sutton, Ken Barr, Vaughn Bodé, Pat Boyette, Ron Cobb, Richard Conway, Jack Davis, H.R. Giger, Basil Gogos, Bill Hughes, Terrance Lindall, Gutenberg Monteiro, Albert Nuetzell, Vic Prezo, Sanjulián, Vincente Segrelles, Kenneth Smith, Enrich Torres and Boris Vallejo.

Writers included Goodwin, Cuti, Dubay, Al Hewetson, Bruce Jones, Doug Moench, Budd Lewis, Gerry Boudreau, Rich Margopoulos, Don McGregor, Steve Skeates, Jim Stenstrum, Lynn Marron, and T. Casey Brennan.

== Milestones ==
The first-known romantic interracial kiss in mainstream comics (as opposed to underground comix) occurred in Warren's Creepy #43 (Jan. 1972), in "The Men Who Called Him Monster" by writer Don McGregor and artist Luis Garcia. McGregor said in 2001 that the kiss was actually due to the artist misunderstanding the line "This is the clincher" in the script. McGregor would later script color comic books' first known interracial romantic kiss, in the "Killraven: Warrior of the Worlds" feature in Amazing Adventures #31 (July 1975).

== List of magazines ==
- 1984 (June 1978–December 1979, 10 issues); retitled as 1994
- 1994 (February 1980–February 1983, 19 issues)
- After Hours (1957, 4 issues)
- Blazing Combat (1965, 4 issues)
- Comix International (July 1974—1977, 5 issues)
- Creepy (1964–1983, 145 issues)
- Dracula (1972, 1 issue)
- Eerie (1966–1983, 139 issues)
- Famous Films (1964, 2 issues); Horror of Party Beach and Curse of Frankenstein/Horror of Dracula
- Famous Monsters of Filmland (February 1958–March 1983, 191 issues)
- Favorite Westerns of Filmland (May 1959—August 1961, 6 issues); retitled Wildest Westerns with #3
- The Goblin (June 1982—November 1982, 3 issues)
- Help! (Augest 1960–September 1965, 26 issues)
- J.R.R. Tolkien's The lord of the Rings 1979 Magazine (1979, 1 issue)
- Monster World (November 1964–September 1966), 10 issues); counted as issues 70–79 of Famous Monsters of Filmland
- Moonraker '79 Magazine (1979, 1 issue)
- The Odd Comic World of Richard Corben (1977, 1 issue)
- On The Scene Presents Freak Out U.S.A.! (February 1967—Fall 1967, 2 issues)
- The Rook (October 1979 - April 1982, 14 issues)
- Screen Thrills Illustrated (June 1962—February 1965, 10 issues)
- Spacemen (July 1961—1965, 9 issues)
- The Spirit (April 1974—October 1976, 17 issues); continued by Kitchen Sink Press with issues #18-41)
- The Spirit Special (1975, 1 issue)
- Teen Love Stories (September 1967–January 1968, 3 issues)
- Vampirella (1969–1983, 112 issues)
- Warren Presents (1979–1981, 14 issues)
