= Creepy (magazine) =

American horror-comics magazine

- Creepy #1 (late 1964), edited by Russ Jones, cover art by Jack Davis

Publication information
- Publisher: Warren Publishing; Dark Horse Comics
- Schedule: Bimonthly (later nine times a year)
- Publication date: Late 1964 – February 1983, 2009 till 2016
- No. of issues: 145
- Editor(s): Russ Jones, Archie Goodwin, Bill Parente, Billy Graham, J.R. Cochran, William DuBay, Louise Jones, Chris Adames, Timothy Moriarty, Shawna Gore, Dave Land, Dan Braun, Sierra Hahn, Brendan Wright

Creepy is an American horror comics magazine launched by Warren Publishing in 1964. Like Mad, it was a black-and-white newsstand publication in a magazine format and did not carry the seal of the Comics Code Authority. An anthology magazine, it was initially published quarterly but later went bimonthly. Each issue's stories were introduced by the host character, Uncle Creepy. Its sister publications were Eerie and Vampirella.

== Launch ==
Illustrator and editor Russ Jones, the founding editor of Creepy in 1964, said that he approached Famous Monsters of Filmland magazine publisher Jim Warren with the idea of horror comics similar to the 1950s' EC Comics comic books. Warren chose not to use the comics industry's voluntary self-censorship Comics Code Authority for his black and white magazines. Warren eventually agreed to Jones' proposal. Jones recalled that:

Originally it was to be a 64-page magazine. Jim cut it back to 48... I made a sketch of my host for the mag and sent it off to Jack Davis to work up a cover. Still no title. Titles are tough. Ask anyone who ever had to come up with one. One night I was sitting in the studio alone, looking at Woody's tear-sheets from the ECs, when Warren called. He was furious and demanded a name for Project D. I was looking at a balloon over an Ingels Old Witch, and in her narrative, the word "creepy" grabbed out at me. I muttered the name to Jim... We now had a title for our mag.

Joe Orlando was not only an illustrator for Creepy but also a story editor on early issues, with his masthead credit reading: "Story Ideas: Joe Orlando". Bill Pearson also worked on the first issue.

== The Archie Goodwin era ==
In 1965, Russ Jones had a falling out with publisher Jim Warren and departed. Archie Goodwin, having already been writing most of the stories and working with most of the regular artists, succeeded him as editor. Goodwin, who became one of comics' foremost writers, helped establish the company as a prominent force in the field of black-and-white comics magazines.

Artists during this era included Neal Adams, Dan Adkins, Reed Crandall, Johnny Craig, Steve Ditko, Frank Frazetta, Gray Morrow, John Severin, Angelo Torres, Alex Toth, Al Williamson and Wally Wood. Originally published quarterly, Creepy switched to bi-monthly by the end of 1965.

To help draw the best possible performance out of the artists working on the series, prior to writing a story, Goodwin would ask the artist what type of story or setting he would like to work in; this also served to narrow Goodwin's thinking, making it easier for him to come up with a story idea. He also wrote a considerable number of adaptations of public domain works for Creepy. Initially, out of a feeling that the original works were overly familiar, he would change either the ending or the beginning of the story when doing these adaptations. Eventually he concluded that this was presumptuous, and began adhering more closely to the original stories.

Goodwin resigned as the editor of Creepy after issue #17 (October 1967). Warren was going through a financial crisis at the time, forcing pay cuts for both writers and artists, driving the majority of the magazine's leading artists to leave, and making Warren fill much of their content with Goodwin-era reprints, which would be prevalent in the magazine until issue #32 in April 1970. A variety of editors ran the magazine during this period, including Bill Parente, Nicola Cuti and Warren himself. Things would pick up starting in 1969 with the premiere of Vampirella magazine. Some of Creepy's original artists, including Frazetta, Crandall and Wood, would return, as did Goodwin, who was associate editor for issues #35 through #39.

== Editors and artists ==
A variety of editors continued to manage Creepy after Goodwin's second departure, including Billy Graham and J. R. Cochran. William Dubay, who had started at Warren as an artist with issue #32 in 1970, became editor of the magazine for issues #50 through #78, except for a short period of time in 1974, when Goodwin returned for issues #61 through #64. Awkward questions of authority which arose between Dubay (who was still editing sister magazine Eerie) and Goodwin were not adequately resolved by publisher Jim Warren, leading to Goodwin's early departure. During this period the frequency of Creepy and Warren's other magazines was upped to nine issues per year.

In late 1971, artists from the Barcelona Studio of Spanish agency Selecciones Ilustradas started appearing in Creepy and other Warren magazines. Artists from Spain would go on to dominate Creepy and the other Warren magazines throughout the 1970s. These artists included Esteban Maroto, Jaime Brocal, Rafael Aura León, Martin Salvador, Luis García, Fernando Fernández, José González, José Beá, Isidro Monés, Sanjulián, and Enrich Torres. Additional artists from S.I.'s Valencia Studio joined Warren in 1974, including José Ortiz, Luis Bermejo, and Leopold Sánchez. Writers during Dubay's era as editor included Gerry Boudreau, Budd Lewis, Jim Stenstrum, Steve Skeates and Doug Moench.

Themed specials dominated Dubay's era as editor, and included two Edgar Allan Poe issues (69 and 70), three Christmas issues (59, 68 and 77), three issues dedicated to a single artist (71, 72 and 74), a science fiction issue (73) and an issue where every story was based on the cover painting (64). This era also featured stories that were printed in color, many of which were done by Richard Corben. Towards the end of his period as editor, many artists from Creepy's first golden era returned, including Alex Toth and John Severin.

Dubay resigned after issue 78 and was replaced by Louise Jones, his former assistant. Jones would edit the magazine until issue #116 in March 1980. Former DC Comics publisher Carmine Infantino joined Warren shortly after he became editor and did pencils for over 50 stories. Much like the wave of Spanish artists that dominated Creepy throughout the mid-1970s, a number of artists from the Philippines joined Warren during Louise Jones' period as editor, including Alex Niño, Alfredo Alcala and Rudy Nebres, remaining with Creepy until its end in 1983. While he had resigned as editor, Dubay remained with Warren and became their dominant writer during this period. Other frequent writers during this period included Bruce Jones, Bob Toomey and Roger McKenzie.

After Louise Jones resigned as editor following issue #116, Dubay returned to edit the magazine using the alias "Will Richardson" until issue #126. After Dubay's departure, various editors, including Chris Adames and Timothy Moriarty, held the position. Reprints once again began in the magazine with many reprint issues being dedicated to a single artist. Warren's last Creepy (#145) was published February 1983, and then he went bankrupt. Harris Publications bought rights after Warren's bankruptcy and published a single issue (#146) in 1985.

In 2000, after a protracted legal dispute with Harris Publications, Jim Warren and Warren Publishing regained sole ownership of all rights to Creepy and Eerie.

== Archives and the relaunch ==
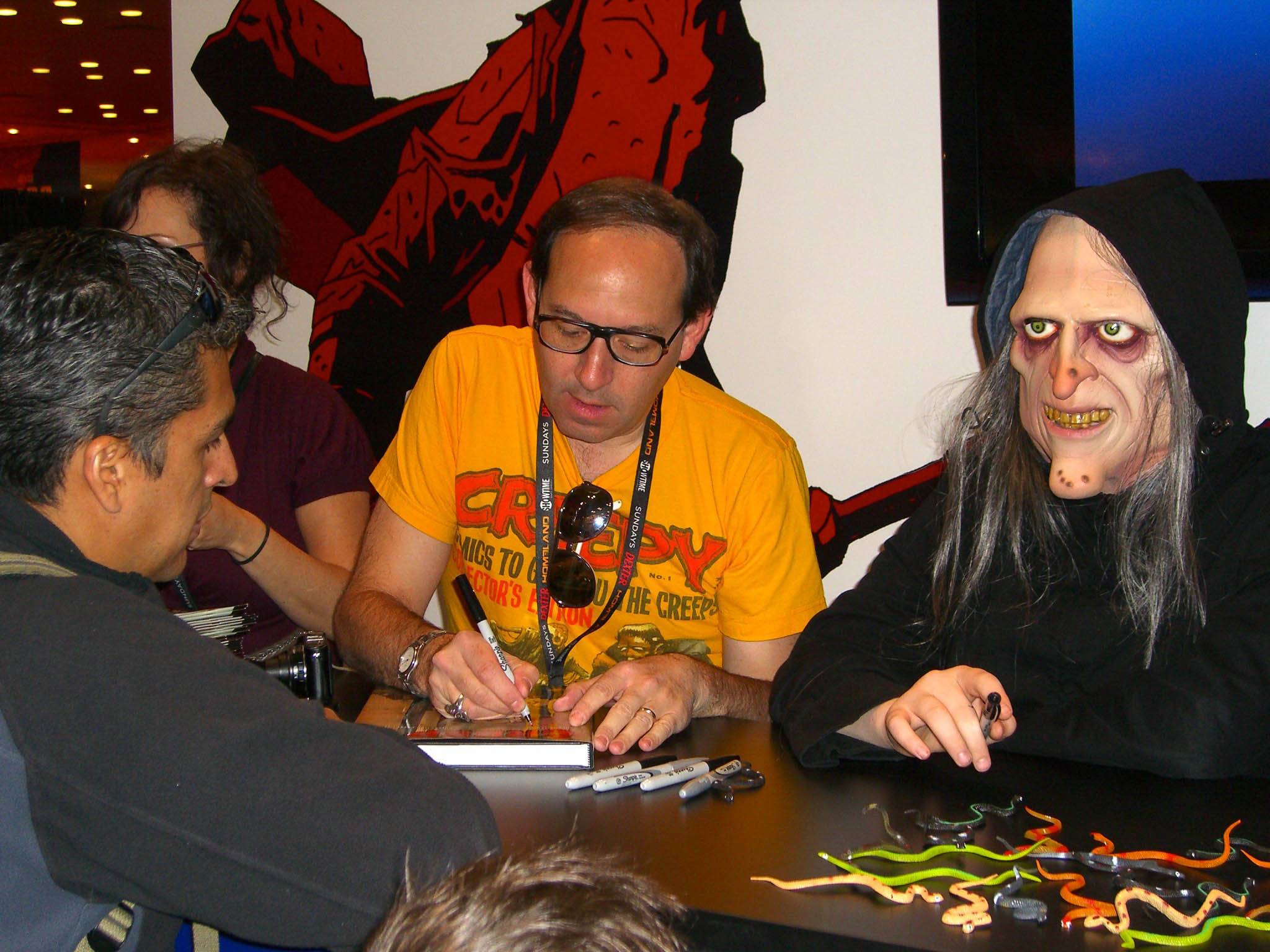
Editor Dan Braun signs a collected edition of Creepy next to a model dressed as Uncle Creepy at the Dark Horse Comics booth at the 2011 New York Comic Con.

In February 2007, New Comic Company LLC completed a total rights acquisition from Warren and his entity for all rights to Creepy and Eerie, after seven years of effort. Terms of the deal were not disclosed. All copyright renewals and trademarks have been re-established in the name of New Comic Company LLC.

Shortly after that rights acquisition deal, in June 2007, New Comic Company LLC principals Dan Braun, Craig Haffner, Josh Braun and Rick Brookwell completed a partnership agreement with Dark Horse Comics and its CEO, Mike Richardson, to republish in archival hardcover form all 285 total issues of the original Creepy and Eerie. The first Creepy archival volume was published in August 2008, with additional releases available every four months. The first Eerie archival volume was released in March 2009, with subsequent archives available every four months.

In July 2009, Dark Horse Comics and New Comic Company LLC released the new Creepy magazine. Edited by Shawna Gore and Dan Braun with Craig Haffner, it displayed the work of artists Bernie Wrightson, Angelo Torres, Saskia Gutekunst, and Jason Shawn Alexander illustrating scripts by Michael Woods, Dan Braun, Joe Harris, and Bill DuBay.

== Awards ==
In 2009, Dan Braun and Shawna Gore won the Eisner Award for Best Archival Collection/Project—Comic Books for Creepy Archive #1.

== Cultural legacy ==
Uncle Creepy is mentioned in an early scene in Percy Jackson & the Olympians: The Lightning Thief.

The back cover of Roger Taylor's (drummer of rock band Queen) solo project album Fun in Space shows him reading the July 1980 issue of Creepy. The album's front cover flips the image, showing the alien from that issue reading a magazine about Roger Taylor.

In 2010, New Comic Company LLC signed a deal with mask company Trick or Treat Studios to release the first officially licensed Uncle Creepy mask in almost 20 years. The mask was sculpted by Trick or Treat Studios Art Director Justin Mabry and was available in Halloween and costumes stores across the world for the 2011 Halloween season.

By September 2012, the apparel company Stüssy launched a line of T-shirts and hats titled "Stüssy x Creepy" featuring Uncle Creepy, the Creepy logo and graphics from the magazines.

An issue of Creepy is visible on the second panel of the first page of The Immortal Hulk #30.
