= Luis Bermejo (illustrator) =

Spanish illustrator and comics artist (1931–2015)

- Born: Luis Bermejo Rojo; 12 August 1931 Madrid, Spain
- Died: 12 December 2015 (aged 84)
- Area: artist
- Notable works: Orka; El Capitán Trueno; El Señor de los Anillos

Luis Bermejo Rojo (12 August 1931 – 12 December 2015) was a Spanish illustrator and comics artist known for his work published in Spain, Italy, Great Britain, and the United States. He has illustrated a number of novels, and worked for a while with DC Comics.

== Biography ==
A sample of Bermejo's work, from American magazine Creepy #71.

Bermejo initially learned the trade as the assistant of Manuel Gago, before he began his comic book artist career in Britain in the late 1950s when through the agency A.L.I., he worked in the titles Girls' Crystal and Tarzan Weekly. He worked on Thriller Picture Library, John Steel, War, Battle Picture Libraries, and Pike Mason in the early 1960s. In 1962 he started drawing the war-themed comic strip Mann of Battle for The Eagle, and drew the strip Heros the Spartan for that title in 1963. Later in the 1960s he drew the superhero Johnny Future.

For much of the 1960s, Bermejo worked out of a studio in Valencia, Spain for the agency Bardon Arts with other artists including José Ortiz, Miguel Quesada, and Emilio Frego. These artists, including Bermejo, started working with Italian agent Pierro D'Ami in 1968, where they did many paintings for books and magazines. During this period Bermejo did a number of comic strips for the magazines Tell Me Why, Once Upon a Time, Look and Learn and Tiny Tots.

In 1974, Bermejo, along with fellow Valencia Studio artists José Ortiz and Leopoldo Sanchez, joined the agency Selecciones Ilustradas and soon started working for Warren Publishing in the US. Bermejo quickly became one of the most prolific artists for Warren, and drew a total of 78 stories from 1974 through 1983, more than any other artist except for José Ortiz and Esteban Maroto. Highlights of Bermejo's period with Warren included a full issue of Creepy (issue #71) dedicated to him, as well as the role of the primary artist for The Rook, which was Warren's most well known recurring character after Vampirella. Bermejo drew the serial The Fox in Vampirella in 1981-1982. He won the award for "Best All Around Artist" at Warren in 1981.

Bermejo wrote and drew an adaption of El Señor de los Anillos (The Lord of the Rings) in Spain in 1980. After Warren's collapse, he drew for Skorpio and Lanciostory in Italy, as well as Relatos Nuevo Mundo, Metropol and Zona 84 in Spain. He also created comics adaptations from the works of Isaac Asimov and Raymond Chandler.

== Sources ==
- Roach, David A.; Cooke, Jon B. The Warren Companion.
