= Reed Crandall =

American cartoonist (1917–1982)

- Reed Crandall as a youth
- Born: Reed Leonard Crandall; February 22, 1917 Winslow, Indiana
- Died: September 13, 1982 (aged 65)
- Areas: Penciller, Inker
- Pseudonym: E. Lectron
- Notable works: Blackhawk, EC Comics
- Awards: Will Eisner Comic Book Hall of Fame; Inkwell Awards SASRA (2023)

Reed Leonard Crandall (February 22, 1917 – September 13, 1982) was an American illustrator and penciller of comic books and magazines. He was best known for the 1940s Quality Comics' Blackhawk and for stories in EC Comics during the 1950s. Crandall was inducted into the Will Eisner Comic Book Hall of Fame in 2009.

== Biography ==
=== Early life and career ===
Reed Crandall was born in Winslow, Indiana, the son of Rayburn Crandall and wife. Crandall graduated from Newton High School in Newton, Kansas, in 1935, and then attended the Cleveland School of Art in Cleveland, Ohio, on a scholarship. He graduated in 1939. His father died in the spring of Crandall's freshman year at art school, which Crandall left temporarily to return to Kansas. His mother and sister moved to Cleveland during Crandall's junior year. With his schoolmate Frank Borth, Crandall found work painting signs on storefront windows. Crandall's art influences included the painters and commercial illustrators N.C. Wyeth, Howard Pyle and James Montgomery Flagg.

Another classmate, the son of the president of the Cleveland-based Newspaper Enterprise Association syndicate, recommended Crandall for a job at NEA as a general art assistant, where Crandall drew maps and other supporting material. Following his desire to be a magazine illustrator, Crandall unsuccessfully made the rounds of glossy magazines in New York City and Philadelphia, and at some point did a small amount of work for a children's book publisher. Moving to New York with his mother and sister, Crandall found work in the fledgling medium of comic books, joining the Eisner and Iger Studio, an early comic book packager that supplied complete, outsourced comics for publishers.

=== Quality Comics ===
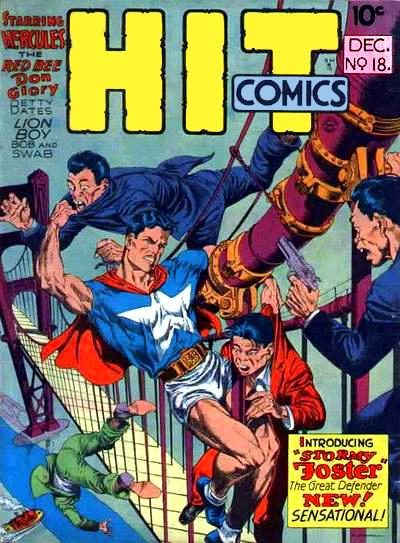
Hit Comics #18 (Dec. 1941), featuring Stormy Foster. Cover art by Crandall.

Crandall drew for comic books from 1939 until 1973. His first work appears in comics from publisher Quality Comics, for which he drew stories starring such superheroes as the Ray (in Smash Comics, beginning in 1941 and initially under the playful pseudonym E. Lectron) and Doll Man (first in Feature Comics in 1941, then in the character's own solo title). His earliest confirmed cover art is for Fiction House's Fight Comics #12 (April 1941) at the Grand Comics Database. Other early work includes inking the pencil art of future industry legend Jack Kirby on two of the earliest Captain America stories, "The Ageless Orientals That Wouldn't Die", in Captain America Comics #2 (April 1941), and "The Queer Case of the Murdering Butterfly and the Ancient Mummies" in #3 (May 1941).

With S.M. "Jerry" Iger credited as writer, Crandall co-created the superhero the Firebrand in Quality's Police Comics #1 (Aug. 1941) and began his long run as artist of his signature series, the World War II aviator-team strip "Blackhawk", in Military Comics #12-22 (Oct. 1942 - Sept. 1943) and, after his WWII service in the Army Air Force, in Blackhawk and in Modern Comics. During this time he also drew the adventures of Captain Triumph in Quality's Crack Comics. His final "Blackhawk" work was a seven-page story, plus the cover, for Blackhawk #67 (Aug. 1953).

=== EC Comics and afterward ===
Crandall went on to become a mainstay of EC Comics, whose line of hit horror and science fiction titles would become as influential to future generations of comics creators as they were controversial in their own time due to their often graphic nature and mature themes. Joining a group that included artists Johnny Craig, Jack Davis, Will Elder, Frank Frazetta, Graham Ingels, Jack Kamen, Bernard Krigstein and Wally Wood, Crandall made his debut there with the seven-page story "Carrion Death," written by Al Feldstein, in Shock SuspenStories #9 (June-July 1953).

He drew dozens of stories across a variety of genres for the EC anthologies Crime SuspenStories, Shock SuspenStories, Tales from the Crypt, Two-Fisted Tales, The Vault of Horror, The Haunt of Fear, Extra!, Impact, Piracy, and Weird Fantasy and its sequel series, Weird Science-Fantasy.

Following the demise of EC in the wake of the 1954 U.S. Senate hearings on juvenile delinquency and a wave of anti-comics sentiment, Reed freelanced for Atlas Comics, the 1950s iteration of Marvel Comics, as well as for the Gilberton Company's Classics Illustrated. Crandall's work for Classics Illustrated consisted of joint projects with EC veteran George Evans on four titles: No. 18, The Hunchback of Notre Dame (Fall 1960); No. 23, Oliver Twist (Fall 1961); No. 68, Julius Caesar (1962); No. 168, In Freedom's Cause (completed 1962; published UK 1963; published US 1969).

In 1960, he went under contract with the publisher of Treasure Chest, a comic book distributed exclusively through parochial schools. Crandall illustrated many covers and countless stories for Treasure Chest through 1972. In 1964, he illustrated books by Edgar Rice Burroughs for Canaveral Press. The following year, he began contributing to Warren Publishing's black-and-white war-comics magazine Blazing Combat, and soon went on to contribute to the company's line of black-and-white horror publications, including Creepy and Eerie. In the mid-to-late 1960s, he illustrated superhero-espionage stories for Tower Comics, and space opera science fiction in King Features Syndicate's King Comics comic-book version of the syndicate's long-running hero Flash Gordon.

In June 1970, Crandall and Buster Crabbe were guests at the Multicon-70 convention in Oklahoma City.

=== Final years ===
Crandall, who had left New York City in the 1960s in order to care for his ailing mother in Wichita, Kansas, had developed alcoholism. Recovering by the time of his mother's death, he nonetheless suffered debilitated health and left art in 1974 to work as a night watchman and janitor for the Pizza Hut general headquarters in Wichita. After suffering a stroke that year, he spent his remaining life in a nursing home and died in 1982 of a heart attack. One of his last published stories, "This Graveyard Is Not Deserted", appeared in Creepy #54 (July 1973). Creepy #58 contained "Soul and Shadow", possibly his last published comic book work.

== Family ==
Crandall married artist Martha Hamilton, and they had two children. Their daughter, artist Cathy Crandall, had three children. Their son, Navy veteran Reed L. "Spike" Crandall (Sept. 8, 1945-July 2, 2005), an artist who owned and operated Crandall's Creations (Clarkesville, Georgia), had a daughter, Samantha Pledger, and three grandchildren.

== Awards and tributes ==
Crandall was inducted into the Will Eisner Comic Book Hall of Fame in 2009.

He is referenced in Michael Chabon's Pulitzer Prize-winning novel The Amazing Adventures of Kavalier and Clay. The fictional character Joe Kavalier refers to Crandall as the "top" comic-book artist of his era. In 2023, Crandall was posthumously awarded the Inkwell Awards SASRA (Stacey Aragon Special Recognition Award).
