= Archie Goodwin (comics) =

American writer (1937–1998)

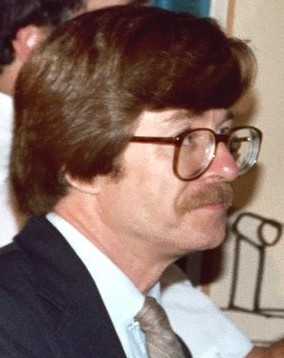
- Born: September 8, 1937 Kansas City, Missouri, U.S.
- Died: March 1, 1998 (aged 60) New York City, U.S.
- Areas: Writer, Penciller, Editor
- Notable works: Vampirella; Manhunter; Luke Cage; Iron Man; Star Wars (comics); Epic Illustrated
- Awards: Shazam Award; Eisner Award; Bill Finger Award; Inkpot Award

Archie Goodwin (September 8, 1937 – March 1, 1998) was an American comic book writer, editor, and artist. He worked on a number of comic strips in addition to comic books, and is known for his Warren and Marvel Comics work. For Warren he was chief writer and editor of landmark horror anthology titles Creepy and Eerie between 1964 and 1967. At Marvel, he served as the company's editor-in-chief from 1976 to the end of 1977. In the 1980s, he edited the publisher's anthology magazine Epic Illustrated and its Epic Comics imprint. He is also known for his work on Star Wars in both comic books and newspaper strips. He is regularly cited as the "best-loved comic book editor, ever."

== Biography ==
=== Early life and career ===
Archie Goodwin was born in Kansas City, Missouri, and lived in many small towns along the Kansas-Missouri border including Coffeyville, Kansas. He considered Tulsa, Oklahoma as his home town. There he spent his teen years at Will Rogers High School and in used magazine stores searching for EC Comics. He was also a contributor to EC fanzines during this time. His classmates at Will Rogers included illustrator Paul Davis and Broomhilda creator Russell Myers forming a cartoonist's club that met daily at the Owl Drugstore at 11th Street and Pittsburg in Tulsa. After one year at the University of Oklahoma, Goodwin moved to New York City to attend classes at what became the School of Visual Arts.

Goodwin began as an artist drawing cartoons for magazines and as a freelance "writer and occasional art assistant" to Leonard Starr's newspaper comic strip Mary Perkins, On Stage. His first editorial work was for Redbook magazine from 1960 to 1964, on which he worked both before and after his Army service as a draftee. He also did cartoons for Fishing World magazine in 1959.

"Comics writing is similar in form to writing a movie script or a play," Goodwin said in an article for the Tulsa Tribune, December 17, 1986. "I write a description of the panel (stage setting), and then the captions (dialogue)," he said. "Since I have some art background, I might do a series of thumbnail drawings before I write anything. Comics writings is like any other kind of writing. You draw on everything that's around you. Watching people on the street, eavesdropping in restaurants – sooner or later, you're going to use all of that."

=== Warren ===
His first story written before he went into the Army was drawn by Al Williamson and Roy Krenkel and published in 1962 just after his discharge from the Army. He was never on staff at Harvey Comics. By 1964 he was the main script writer for Warren's Creepy magazine. Much of his work there, according to Batman editor Mark Chiarello, was a "homage to the favorite comics of his youth, the E.C. line." By the second issue he was co-credited (alongside Russ Jones) as editor, and soon became editor of the entire Warren line: Creepy, Eerie and Blazing Combat. He worked for Warren between 1964 and 1967, as head writer and Editor-in-Chief, in which roles he is credited with providing a mythology for Warren's classic Vampirella character, as well as penning her most compelling stories.

After his departure from Warren in 1967, Goodwin would occasionally contribute stories over the next 15 years and even returned for a short stint as editor in 1974.

=== Famous name ===
Archie Goodwin's first prose story was published by Ellery Queen's Mystery Magazine, which warned him he could not use Archie Goodwin as a pen name because it was a Rex Stout character in the Nero Wolfe books. According to Goodwin's wife Anne T. Murphy, the magazine's editors "then were so delighted when he wrote back to say that it was his real name that they used the anecdote as the introduction to the story, which ran in the July 1962 issue." (It was actually the July 1964 issue.)

=== Comic strips ===
From 1967 to 1980, Goodwin wrote scripts for King Features Syndicate, including the daily strip Secret Agent X-9, drawn by Al Williamson and editor Sylvan Byck, as well as working on other strips ghost writing Captain Kate by Hale and Jerry Skelly. He also worked with Williamson on Flash Gordon comics #3–7 published by King Comics in 1966.

Star Hawks was a comic strip created by Ron Goulart and Gil Kane, first published on October 3, 1977, that ran through May 2, 1981 by United Feature Syndicate. It was written through April 1979 by Goulart, followed by Archie Goodwin (1979–1980).

His experience ghost writing Dan Flagg inspired "The Success Story" (drawn by Williamson, who had ghosted on Flagg) for Creepy No. 1 (1964), famed among comic strip fans for its EC style dark humor in depicting a creator whose only contribution to the strip that made him rich was his signature.

=== Blackmark ===
Blackmark is a paperback book (Bantam S5871) published by the American company Bantam Books in January 1971. It is one of the first American graphic novels. It was conceived and drawn by comic book artist Gil Kane, and scripted by Archie Goodwin from an outline by Kane.

=== DC Comics ===
Goodwin worked briefly for DC Comics during the 1970s, where he edited the war comics G.I. Combat, Our Fighting Forces, and Star Spangled War Stories, and replaced Julius Schwartz as editor of Detective Comics for one year. Goodwin's collaboration with Walt Simonson on the "Manhunter" back-up feature in Detective Comics won several awards. Goodwin also wrote the Batman lead feature in Detective Comics, where his collaborators included artists Jim Aparo, Sal Amendola, Howard Chaykin, and Alex Toth.

=== Marvel Comics ===
Goodwin first worked for Marvel Comics in 1968 and was the original writer on the Iron Man series which launched that year. According to Goodwin, when he entered editor Stan Lee's office to apply for a job with Marvel, Lee was in the middle of writing an Iron Man story and handed him photostats of the pages he was working on for his writer's test. Goodwin speculated, "I assume if he had been working on Sgt. Fury, I'd have been writing Sgt. Fury. Thank God he wasn't writing Millie the Model when I walked in." Goodwin and artist George Tuska co-created the supervillain the Controller in Iron Man No. 12 (April 1969).

Luke Cage, the first African American superhero to star in an eponymous Marvel comic book series, was created by Goodwin and artist John Romita Sr. in June 1972. While briefly writing The Tomb of Dracula series, Goodwin and artist Gene Colan introduced the supporting character Rachel van Helsing. Goodwin co-created (with Marie Severin) the first Spider-Woman, as well as writing her first appearance in Marvel Spotlight No. 32 (February 1977).

Goodwin also co-designed Marvel's New Universe line and created four of the eight series in the line. He explained, "[Marvel editor-in-chief] Jim Shooter keeps saying of me: 'Well, here's this guy, in one meeting, he suddenly spews out half the ideas for the New Universe.' What that doesn't take into account is that for about five or six years I've had these half-formed notions and finally here is a situation where they would all fit in. ...it wasn't like I just went into the meeting and suddenly four concepts sprang full-blown from my brow."

==== Star Wars ====
In 1976, Goodwin replaced Gerry Conway to become the eighth editor-in-chief of Marvel Comics, with the understanding that it would only be temporary until a permanent replacement could be found. He ultimately resigned at the end of 1977 and was replaced by Jim Shooter. While Goodwin was editor-in-chief, Marvel secured the rights to publish the Star Wars film's comic adaptation and tie-in series, which then sold phenomenally well (helped by a dearth of other Star Wars merchandise at the time) at a point when the comics industry was in severe decline. Goodwin recalled about the Star Wars comic book, "That really worked ... but I can't take any credit for it. Roy Thomas is the one who brought it to Marvel, and he had to push a little bit to get them to do it." He followed Thomas in adapting the Star Wars characters into an ongoing comic book with artist Carmine Infantino, as well as continuing the story (pre-Return of the Jedi) in a daily comic strip. Goodwin wrote the strips under his own name, although many websites and other sources erroneously claim he used the pseudonyms R.S. Helm and Russ Helm. Writer Mark Evanier corrected the matter by stating "Archie did write the Star Wars comic strip (as well as other Star Wars material) but only under his own name. Russ Helm was a completely different person writing under his own name." During Goodwin and Infantino's tenure on Marvel's Star Wars series, it was one of the industry's top selling titles. He wrote comic book adaptations for Marvel of the two Star Wars sequels as well as other science-fiction films such as Close Encounters of the Third Kind and Blade Runner.

=== Heavy Metal ===
Alien: The Illustrated Story, or simply Alien, is an American sixty-four-page graphic novel adaptation of the 1979 science fiction film Alien published by Heavy Metal magazine in 1979. It was scripted by Archie Goodwin and drawn by Walt Simonson. The book was a major critical and commercial success and was the first comic to ever be listed on the New York Times Bestsellers list.

While developing the comic, Goodwin worked from the original script. Simonson, as well, had access to production stills and even saw a rough cut of the film, which helped him capture the essence of the story. As a result, however, a few scenes that were cut from the final film ended up being included in the graphic novel.

One reviewer praised Archie Goodwin's script adaptation, which he felt improved on some flaws in the film: "Goodwin... seems to get more into the class divisions on board the Nostromo between Ripley and Parker... [T]he characters are a bit more fleshed out..."

Heavy Metal published an eight-page teaser for the book in Heavy Metal magazine in vol. 3, No. 1 (May 1979). A second eight-page preview was published in Heavy Metal vol. 3, No. 2 (June 1979). The original 64-page trade paperback was released in June 1979 and distributed by Simon & Schuster. The comic was also translated in Japanese, Spanish and Dutch.

==== Epic ====
After Marvel Comics passed on publishing the American incarnation of Metal Hurlant (Heavy Metal), Editor-in-chief Jim Shooter was charged with producing an alternate title, which became Epic Illustrated. It was initially edited by Rick Marschall, but Shooter approached publisher Stan Lee to urge a replacement: "I told Stan, 'There's one guy who could do this. I don't know if we can get him.' He said, 'Who's that?' 'Archie Goodwin.' The reason I didn't think we could get him is because he used to be my boss and I didn't know how he'd feel about coming back and me being his boss."

Goodwin was at the time still working for Marvel as a writer, and Shooter recalls concocting a plan whereby the company "pretended that Archie reported to Stan. In fact, I was doing all the paperwork and all the employee reviews and the budgets" so that Goodwin could have the illusion of not working for his successor. In the autumn of 1979, Marschall was fired and Goodwin hired as Epic's editor.

Shooter approached Goodwin after the moderate success of the Epic magazine and creator-owned graphic novels to produce a full-fledged line of creator-owned comics, Epic Comics. Goodwin initially balked at the additional workload, and Shooter turned the line over to Al Milgrom before Goodwin ultimately accepted editorship.

Goodwin introduced the first English translation of Katsuhiro Otomo's Akira and published English translations of the work of Jean Giraud, a.k.a. Moebius. Archie also gave many writers and artists their first jobs in comic including Todd McFarlane in Coyote #11-14 with his first cover on issue 13.

=== Return to DC ===
Goodwin returned to DC Comics as an editor and writer in 1989. He wrote the graphic novel Batman: Night Cries painted by Scott Hampton and published in 1992. Throughout the 1990s, Goodwin edited a number of Batman projects, including the Elseworlds miniseries Batman: Thrillkiller, and the Alan Grant-written/Kevin O'Neill-illustrated parody one-shot Batman: Mitefall, a take-off of the "Knightfall" saga, filtered through the character of Bat-Mite. Armageddon 2001 was a 1991 crossover event storyline. It ran through a self-titled, two issue limited series and most of the annuals DC published that year from May through October. Each participating annual explored potential possible futures for its main characters. The series was written by Goodwin and Dennis O'Neil and drawn by Dan Jurgens.

Among Goodwin's most notable last editorial projects were Starman, written by James Robinson and first published by DC in 1994 and DC's Batman: The Long Halloween by Tim Sale and Jeph Loeb. Loeb and Sale's first work on Batman appeared in Batman: Legends of the Dark Knight Halloween Special No. 1 (Dec. 1993) edited by Goodwin. It is a testament to Goodwin that Loeb has said that Goodwin inspired their portrayal of Gotham police chief Jim Gordon in The Long Halloween and its sequel Batman: Dark Victory, while Robinson (who considered Goodwin both a mentor and close personal friend), continued to list Goodwin as a "Guiding Light" on later issues of Starman published after Goodwin's death. Goodwin edited Batman: Legends of the Dark Knight and Azrael. Goodwin's Creepy work is cited by editor Mark Chiarello as informing the creation of the Batman: Black & White series.

=== Death ===
In the Spring of 1990 he was diagnosed as having cancer and undertook a course of chemo-therapy while still working at DC. Goodwin died on March 1, 1998, after battling the disease for 8 years.

=== Archives ===
The Archie Goodwin Archive and Collection are housed at OKPOP (Oklahoma Museum of Pop Culture) in Tulsa, Oklahoma. Donated by his children Jennifer and Seth Goodwin.

== Awards ==
Goodwin's work won him a good deal of recognition in the industry, including both the 1973 Shazam Award for Best Writer (Dramatic Division), and the 1974 Shazam Award for Best Writer (Dramatic Division) for the Manhunter series running in Detective Comics #437–443. In the same years, he also won Shazam Awards for Best Individual Short Story for "The Himalayan Incident" in Detective Comics No. 437 and for "Cathedral Perilous" in Detective Comics No. 441. In 1974, he also won Best Individual Feature-Length Story for "Götterdämmerung" in Detective Comics No. 443. All story awards were shared with Walt Simonson for Manhunter episodes). Goodwin's work on Manhunter, in which he both updated an obscure Golden Age hero, and, in the series' last episode, took the daring approach of killing him off (one of the few comic book deaths that has actually "taken" and not been reversed or retconned away in the decades since it occurred) is very well regarded by both fans and other comics professionals.

Goodwin stated in his final interview, "I think that Manhunter is one of just several projects that I've worked on that I consider a highlight in my career. It is something that I may never be able to top in a lot of ways. To have done that and for DC to have given me the opportunity to do that was great."

In 1980, he shared the Eagle Award for Favorite Comic Magazine given to Epic Illustrated.

In 1982, he received the Inkpot Award given by San Diego Comic-Con.

He threepeated winning the Harvey Award for Best American Edition of Foreign Material given to Epic's collected Moebius albums in 1988, for Epic's Moebius series The Incal in 1989 and in 1990 for Best Foreign Reprint given to Epic's Akira series.

He won "Bob Clampett Humanitarian" Eisner Award in 1992.

In 1993, he won the Wizard Fan Award with Denny O'Neil, Joe Quesada and Kevin Nowlan for the Favorite Miniseries for Batman: Sword of Azrael.

He was named Best Editor by the Eisners in 1993. As well as receiving the UK Comic Art Award for Best Graphic Novel with Scott Hampton for Batman: Night Cries.

1997 brought more Harvey Awards to Archie by winning Best Domestic Reprint Project, with Bob Kahan, for Batman: The Dark Knight Returns 10th Anniversary Edition Hardcover.

Archie was also awarded two Eisner Awards in 1997. First with Gary Gianni for Best Short Story for "Heroes" from Batman: Black & White and another with James Robinson, Tony Harris and Wade Von Grawbadger for Best Serialized Story for Starman "Sand and Stars" (Issues #20-23)

Goodwin was honored posthumously in 1998, by being named to the National Comics Award Roll of Honour and he was entered into the Eisner Hall of Fame.

In 2007, Goodwin was inducted into the Oklahoma Cartoonists Hall of Fame in Pauls Valley, Oklahoma, located in the Toy and Action Figure Museum.

In 2008, he was one of two recipients of that year's Bill Finger Award, which annually honors one living and one deceased comics creator. The award was presented July 25, 2008, during the 2008 Will Eisner Comic Industry Awards ceremony at San Diego Comic-Con.

== Appearances within comics ==
He makes a cameo appearance in a crowd scene on the splash page of Ms. Marvel volume 1 No. 15, (March 1978) with thought balloons showing him trying out various nicknames for himself.

Archie appears in a crowd scene on the cover/back cover of DC All New Collectors' Edition #56 "Superman vs. Muhammad Ali" (1978) drawn by Neal Adams and edited by fellow Oklahoman E. Nelson Bridwell. Archie is No. 15 on the key and is sitting in front of the Jackson 5 on the back cover.

He is name-checked in issues of Marvel's Star Wars comics including in the alien-language words "Niwdoog Eihcra", his name in reverse.

A character based on him appears in issue No. 82 of Cerebus (January 1986). He stands at the foot of the giant, living stone statue Tarim and repeats everything Tarim says – as if he is passing Tarim's commands to the masses. At the end, the annoyed Tarim threatens to kill "anyone pretending to speak for Tarim" when Archie's character looks up and stops repeating Tarim by telling the masses to get to work. The scene has often been interpreted as an allegory for Goodwin's relationship with Jim Shooter, but Cerebus writer/artist Dave Sim denies this and said "I have nothing but the greatest respect for Archie and in no way intended anything but a little 'hello' to one of my favorite New Yorkers."

In Marvel Comics', What The--?! No. 5, (July 1989) Goodwin appears as King Archibald the First in the short story The Alien-Ated Legion, which parodies the mature approach of Epic Comics. In the last panels, King Archibald says that he had never been interested in superhero comics.

The airport in fictional Gotham City, home of the Batman, is named the Archie Goodwin International Airport. The airport made its first appearance in Batman No. 34 (April 1946) and remained unnamed until it was given a name on a Gotham City map made for the Batman: No Man's Land crossover event in 1999.

In the first DC Comics spinoff of Batman: The Animated Series called The Batman Adventures. Goodwin appears as Mr. Nice, a super-strong, but childishly-innocent super-villain. He is one of a screwball trio of incompetent super-villains that includes The Mastermind (a caricature of Mike Carlin) and The Professor (a caricature of Dennis O'Neil). Their first appearance comes in No. 10 (July 1993) with the Riddler. The trio's first cover appearance came in No. 20 (May 1994) and their last story came in No. 30 (March 1995).

Batman: Gotham Adventures No. 13 (June 1999) features the last appearance of the characters with Mr. Nice leaving the group to fulfill a prophecy, with the issue being dedicated to Archie Goodwin.

== Bibliography ==
=== Adventure House Press ===
- His Name is Savage #1 (script with Gil Kane) (1968)

=== Atlas/Seaboard ===
- The Destructor #1–3 (1975)
- Savage Combat Tales #1–3 (1974–1975)
- Thrilling Adventure Stories #2 (1975)

=== DC Comics ===
- All-Out War #4–5 (1980)
- Armageddon 2001 No. 1 (1991)
- Batman Black and White No. 1, 4 (1996)
- Batman: Legends of the Dark Knight #132–136 (2000)
- Batman: Night Cries HC (1992)
- Detective Comics #437–443, Annual No. 3 (1973–1974, 1990)
- G.I. Combat #158–168, 170, 172–173 (Haunted Tank) (1973–1974)
- House of Mystery No. 198 (1972)
- Manhunter: The Special Edition TPB (incl. new story) (1999)
- Our Fighting Forces No. 146, 150 (1973–1974)
- Showcase '95 No. 11 (1995)
- Star Spangled War Stories #167–171, 176, 189, 197 (1973–1976)
- Unknown Soldier No. 234 (1979)

=== Harvey Comics ===
- Alarming Adventures #1 (1962)

=== Heavy Metal ===
- Alien: The Illustrated Story (1979)

=== King Comics ===
- Flash Gordon #2, 4–5 (1966–67)

=== Marvel Comics ===
- The Amazing Spider-Man 150, Annual No. 11 (1975–1977)
- Bizarre Adventures No. 28 (1981)
- Capt. Savage and His Leatherneck Raiders No. 7 (1968)
- Captain Marvel No. 16 (1969)
- Dazzler #38–42 (1985–1986)
- Epic Illustrated #2–3, 13, 17–24, 27, 29, 31–32, 34 (1980–1986)
- Fantastic Four #115–118, 182 (1971–1977)
- The Further Adventures of Indiana Jones #9, 13 (1983–1984)
- Hero for Hire #1–4 (1972)
- Heroes for Hope Starring the X-Men No. 1 (1985)
- The Incredible Hulk No. 106, 148–151, 154–157 (1968–1972)
- Iron Man #1–28, 88–90 (1968–1976)
- Iron Man and Sub-Mariner No. 1 (1968)
- Justice No. 1 (1986)
- Kull and the Barbarians No. 2 (1975)
- Marvel Premiere No. 4 (Doctor Strange) (1972)
- Marvel Spotlight No. 32 (Spider-Woman) (1977)
- Marvel Spotlight vol. 2 No. 4 (Captain Marvel) (1980)
- Marvel Super Action No. 1 (Punisher) (1976)
- Marvel Super Special No. 3 (Close Encounters of the Third Kind); No. 16 (The Empire Strikes Back); No. 22 (Blade Runner); No. 27 (Return of the Jedi) (1978–1983)
- Marvel Super-Heroes No. 15 (Medusa) (1968)
- Marvel Super-Heroes vol. 2 No. 4 (Spider-Man and Nick Fury) (1990)
- Nick Fury, Agent of S.H.I.E.L.D. #6–7 (1968)
- Nightmask #1–2, 4, 8 (1986–1987)
- Pizzazz (Star Wars comic) #7–16 (1978–1979)
- Power Man and Iron Fist #103–104, 108 (1984)
- Rawhide Kid No. 79 (1970)
- Savage Sword of Conan No. 1, 3–4 (1974–1975)
- Savage Tales No. 11 (1975)
- Savage Tales vol. 2 No. 1, 2, 8 (1985–1986)
- Sgt. Fury and his Howling Commandos No. 74 (1970)
- The Spectacular Spider-Man #4–5, 7–8, 15 (1977–1978)
- Star Wars #11–23, 25–45, 47, 50, 98 (1978–1985)
- Tales of Suspense No. 99 (Iron Man) (1968)
- Tales to Astonish No. 99, 101 (Sub-Mariner) (1968)
- The Tomb of Dracula #3–4 (1972)
- Unknown Worlds of Science Fiction Annual No. 1 (1976)
- Wolverine #17–23 (1989–1990)
- Wolverine/Nick Fury: The Scorpio Connection HC (1989)

=== Marvel UK ===
- Star Wars Weekly (original stories) #94–99, 104–106 (1979–1980)

=== Warren ===
- Blazing Combat #1–4 (1965–1966)
- Creepy #1–17, 29, 66, 78, 109–110, 112, 114 (1964–1979)
- Eerie #2–11, 15–16, 128 (1965–1981)
- Vampirella #8–9, 11–16, 37, 79, 100 (1970–1981)

Preceded by Gerry Conway	Marvel Comics Editor-in-Chief; 1976–1978	Succeeded by Jim Shooter
Preceded by Stan Lee	Iron Man writer 1968–1970	Succeeded by Allyn Brodsky
Preceded by Stan Lee	Fantastic Four writer 1971–1972	Succeeded by Stan Lee
Preceded by Roy Thomas	The Incredible Hulk writer 1972	Succeeded by Steve Englehart
Preceded by Julius Schwartz	Detective Comics editor 1973–1974	Succeeded by Julius Schwartz
Preceded by Bill Mantlo	Iron Man writer 1976	Succeeded by Gerry Conway
Preceded by Peter David	Wolverine writer 1989–1990	Succeeded by Jo Duffy
