= Eerie (magazine) =

American horror-comics magazine

- Eerie #11 (1967), cover art by Joe Orlando

Publication information
- Publisher: Warren Publishing
- Schedule: Bimonthly (later 9 times a year)
- Publication date: March 1966 – February 1983
- No. of issues: 139
- Editor(s): Archie Goodwin, Bill Parente, Billy Graham, J.R. Cochran, Bill DuBay, Louise Jones, Chris Adames, Timothy Moriarty

Eerie is an American magazine of horror comics introduced in 1966 by Warren Publishing. Like Mad, it was a black-and-white magazine intended for newsstand distribution and did not submit its stories to the comic book industry's voluntary Comics Code Authority. Each issue's stories were introduced by the host character, Cousin Eerie. Its sister publications were Creepy and Vampirella.

== Publication history ==
The first issue cost 35¢, was published in September 1965 and only had a 200-issue run of an "ashcan" edition. With a logo by Ben Oda, it was created overnight by editor Archie Goodwin and letterer Gaspar Saladino to establish publisher Jim Warren's ownership of the title when it was discovered that a rival publisher (later known as Eerie Publications) would be using the name. Eerie was launched as a companion magazine to Creepy.

Official distribution began with the second issue (March 1966), still priced at 35¢. Behind the Frank Frazetta cover were graphic horror tales edited by Goodwin and hosted by the lumpish Cousin Eerie, a curious character created by Jack Davis. With scripts by Goodwin, E. Nelson Bridwell and Larry Ivie, the second issue featured art by Gene Colan, Johnny Craig (as Jay Taycee), Reed Crandall, Jerry Grandenetti (uncredited), Gray Morrow, Joe Orlando, John Severin, Angelo Torres and Alex Toth. Other artists during this era included Wally Wood, Al Williamson, Neal Adams, Dan Adkins, and Steve Ditko. Eerie was published on a bi-monthly basis.

Goodwin would eventually resign as the editor of Eerie after issue #11 in September 1967. Warren was going through a financial crisis at the time, forcing pay cuts for both writers and artists, driving the majority of the magazine's leading artists to leave, and making Warren fill much of their content with Goodwin-era reprints, which would be prevalent in the magazine until issue #26 in March 1970. Editors during this period included Bill Parente and publisher Jim Warren himself. Things would pick up starting in 1969 with the premiere of Vampirella magazine. Some of Eerie's original artists including Frazetta, Crandall and Wood would return, as would Goodwin, as associate editor for issues #29 through 33.

A variety of editors would continue to manage Eerie after Goodwin's second departure, including Billy Graham and J.R. Cochran. Bill DuBay, who first joined Warren as an artist in 1970, would become editor of the magazine for issues #43 through 72. During this period the frequency of Eerie and Warren's other magazines was upped to nine issues per year. Color stories would begin appearing in Eerie starting with issue #54 in February 1974.

In late 1971, artists from the Barcelona Studio of Spanish agency Selecciones Illustrada started appearing in Eerie and other Warren magazines. These artists included Esteban Maroto, Jaime Brocal, Rafael Aura Leon, Martin Salvador, Luis Garcia, Jose Gonzalez, Jose Bea, Isidro Mones, Sanjulián and Enrich Torres. Additional artists from S.I.'s Valencia Studio joined Warren in 1974 including José Ortiz, Luis Bermejo, and Leopold Sanchez. Towards the end of DuBay's time as editor, artists from Eerie's first golden era, including Alex Toth and John Severin returned. Notable writers during DuBay's era as editor included Gerry Boudreau, Budd Lewis, Jim Stenstrum, Steve Skeates and Doug Moench.

Dubay resigned after issue #72 and was replaced by Louise Jones, his former assistant. Jones would edit the magazine until #110 (April 1980). Former DC Comics publisher Carmine Infantino would also join Warren shortly after she became editor. Much like the wave of Spanish artists that dominated the magazine throughout the mid-1970s, a number of artists from the Philippines would join Warren during Jones's period as editor, including Alex Niño, Alfredo Alcala and Rudy Nebres and would remain at Eerie until its end in 1983. The Rook, an adventurer who first appeared in #82 (March 1977), would appear in nearly every issue of the magazine over the next two years and would eventually be given his own magazine. While he had resigned as editor, DuBay remained with Warren and became their dominant writer during this period. Other dominant writers during this period included Bruce Jones, Bob Toomey and Roger McKenzie.

=== Cancellation and legal battles ===
After Louise Jones resigned as editor following issue #110, DuBay returned to edit the magazine using the alias "Will Richardson" until issue 120. After DuBay's departure various editors including Chris Adames and Timothy Moriarty held the position. Reprints would once again start predominantly appearing in the magazine, with many reprint issues being dedicated to a single artist. Eerie's last issue #139 was published in February 1983 when Warren went bankrupt.

In 1983, Harris Publications acquired Warren's assets, including Eerie, Creepy, and Vampirella. Harris published a single issue of Creepy (#146), but legal murkiness prevented him from publishing further issues or any issues of Eerie. In 2000, after a protracted legal dispute with Harris, Jim Warren and Warren Publishing regained sole ownership of all rights to Creepy and Eerie.

=== Collected editions ===
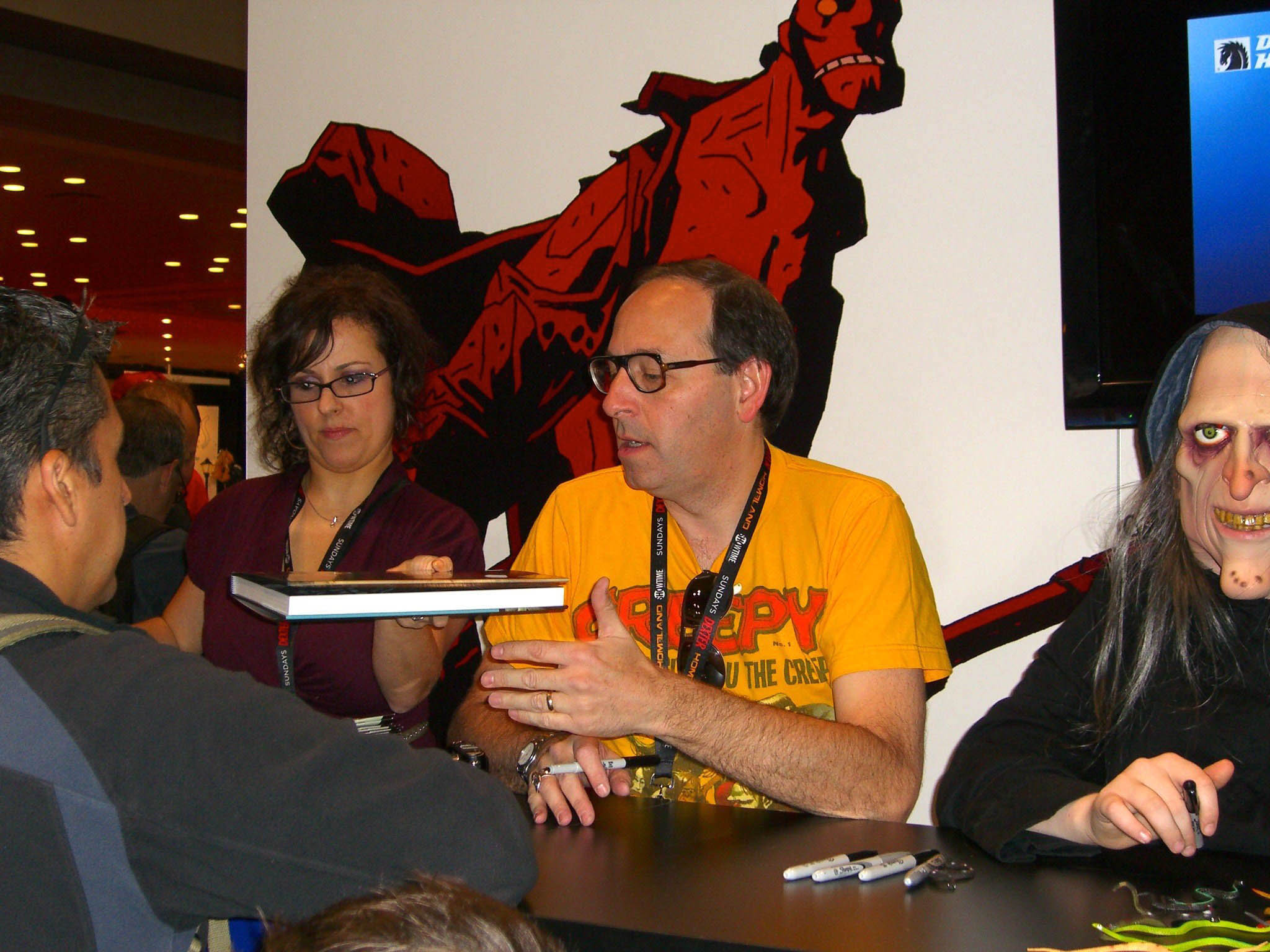
Editor Dan Braun signs collected edition of Creepy and Eerie next to a model dressed as the Creepy mascot, Uncle Creepy, at the Dark Horse Comics booth at the 2011 New York Comic Con.

In February 2007, New Comic Company, LLC, after seven years of effort, completed a total rights acquisition from Warren and his entity for all rights in perpetuity to Creepy and Eerie. Terms of the deal were never disclosed, although it has been rumored it was a complete buyout and all copyright renewals and trademarks have been re-established in the name of New Comic Company LLC.

Shortly after that rights acquisition deal, in June 2007, New Comic Company LLC principals Dan Braun, Craig Haffner, Josh Braun, and Rick Brookwell completed a partnership agreement with Dark Horse Comics and its CEO Mike Richardson to republish in archival hardcover form all 285 total issues of the original Creepy and Eerie. The first archival volume Creepy release date was August 2008, the second December 2008, with additional releases planned every four months. The first archival volume Eerie release date was March 15, 2009, with additional releases every four months. In addition, Dark Horse and New Comic Company launched the new Creepy comic magazine in June 2009.

== Recurring characters and series ==
Unlike its companion magazine, Creepy, which relied on standalone anthology stories, Eerie would become dominated by serialized storylines.

This started with #36 with the short-lived feature "Prince Targo of Manaii", which reappeared only in #37 and #40. A more lasting character debuted in #39 (April 1972) with the series "Dax the Warrior", which would run for twelve issues. By #48 (June 1973) most if not all of each issue contained continuing stores. Initially, most of the serials in Eerie were based on famous horror characters, including Dracula, the Werewolf, and the Mummy. Over time, they were replaced with original characters. Issue #130 was devoted to a huge crossover story with many of the better-known of the series characters, along with Vampirella. Some of the recurring characters and series that appeared in Eerie include the following:

"Dax the Warrior" - Art and writing by Esteban Maroto. Twelve parts in total, which appeared in #39-52. This series was a reprinting of Maroto's "Manly", which originally appeared in Spain. It featured the often downbeat adventures of Dax, a powerful warrior. During his travels Dax would encounter many sorcerers, witches, beasts and even Death itself. Ten out of twelve parts were reprinted in issue #59, and were heavily rewritten by writer Budd Lewis, who renamed the serial Dax the Damned.

"The Mummy Walks" - Art by Jaime Brocal Remohí, and written by Steve Skeates. Six parts in total, which appeared in issues #48-54. It starred Jerome Curry, a "warped and lowly man" in turn of the century Boston who was able to use the body of an Egyptian mummy to destroy his enemies and gain social status through amulet-based thought transference. The entire series was reprinted in issue #78.

"Curse of the Werewolf" - Originally written by Al Milgrom, with art by Bill DuBay and Rich Buckler. Arthur Lemming was the title character, a kindly English gentleman whose werewolf curse tears his whole life apart. In successive episodes, Arthur brutally murders his wife, his daughter, a whole camp full of friendly gypsies, and various friends and neighbors, while being hunted by a haughty, self-righteous werewolf-hunter turned magician named Goodman Blacker. After the first two parts, the artists were replaced by artist Martin Salvador. Milgrom would eventually be replaced as writer by Steve Skeates. This series had seven parts in total, which appeared in issues #48-56. This series and "The Mummy Walks" were combined for a three-part series titled "And the Mummies Walk" in issues #61-63, with art by Joaquin Blazquez.

"Dracula" - Art by Tom Sutton, and written by Bill DuBay, this series featured a Dracula character that had originally been developed in Vampirella, a relatively conscientious lord of the vampire world who traveled the world seeking to help the needy while researching a cure for his ancient curse. Three parts in total, the character appeared in issues #46-48. An additional three-part series starring Dracula would appear in Vampirella in issues #39-41.

"Dr. Archaeus" - Art by Isidro Monés, and written by Gerry Boudreau. Seven parts in total, appearing in issues #54-61. This series revolved around a man who had been sentenced to death, but survived his hanging and sought revenge on the jury, killing them in a manner inspired by the 12 days of Christmas.

"Hunter" - Art by Paul Neary, and written by Rich Margopoulos, Budd Lewis and Bill DuBay. Six parts in total, appearing in issues #52-57. Set in a near-future world devastated by nuclear war, it features Damien Hunter, a half man/half demon who seeks to destroy all the demons on Earth, including his father Oephal. As a half-breed consumed by self-loathing, Hunter frequently moralized on racial issues in contemporary America. The entire series would be reprinted in issue #69. Although Hunter died in the final part, a sequel titled "Hunter II", featuring a new character, appeared in issues #67, #68, #70-72, and #101. A "Hunter III" spoof appeared in #87. A crossover story with Darklon the Mystic appeared in #121.

"Schreck" - Art by Vicente Alcazar and Neal Adams (first appearance only), and written by Doug Moench. Four parts in total, appearing in issues #53-55. Radiation from nuclear testing causes mutations to occur to many people on Earth, turning them into bloodthirsty zombies. The title character would later re-appear in the later "Hunter" series toward its end.

"Child" - Art by Richard Corben, and written by Greg Potter and Budd Lewis (last part only), it is a retelling of the Frankenstein story, with the monster being a childlike creature. Three parts in total, the character appeared in issues #57-60.

"The Spook" - Originally written by Doug Moench, with art by Esteban Maroto, they would be replaced by writer Budd Lewis and artist Leopold Sanchez after the first few stories. This series explored slavery and race relations in the Old South by charting the adventures of a proud black zombie in the 19th century. Seven parts in total, The Spook appeared in issues #57-66. A spin-off story titled 'Papa Voodoo' appeared in issue #67.

"Night of the Jackass" - Art by José Ortiz, and written by Bruce Bezaire. Four parts in total, in issues #60-65. The story features a drug, Hyde 25(m), which causes anyone who uses it to become a powerful monster, but brings death after 24 hours. All four parts would be reprinted in issue #115.

"Exterminator One" - Art by Paul Neary, and written by Bill DuBay. Three parts in total, in issues #60, #63 and #64. The story features a cyborg assassin known as Exterminator One. Two additional stories in the "Exterminator" series that featured other characters appeared in issues #58 and #61, and an Exterminator would also appear in the "Hunter II" series.

"Apocalypse" - Art by José Ortiz, and written by Budd Lewis. Four parts in total, in issues #61-65. The story features the four horsemen of the Apocalypse - War, Famine, Plague and Death.

"Coffin" - Art by Jose Ortiz, and written by Budd Lewis. In the Old West, Coffin is a well-meaning "dude" from back East who mistakenly attacks a Native American village. Coffin received false information that the tribe attacked a stagecoach he was on. After being captured, he is staked to the ground and horrifically mutilated. He is then cursed by the last remaining Native American to live forever, and spends the remainder of the series trying to redeem himself and find a way to die. Four parts in total, Coffin appeared in issues #61, #67, #68 and #70.

"The Rook" - Art and writing by Bill DuBay, The Rook is scientist named Restin Dane, who comes from a family of scientists whose members include the unnamed protagonist of the novel The Time Machine by H. G. Wells. Dane gains his nickname from the fact that his time machine resembles a giant rook chess piece. Taking to wearing Western-style clothing and a gun belt, he has his first time-travel adventure at the Alamo in order to save an ancestor. There he succeeds in rescuing his great-great-grandfather Bishop Dane, who accompanies him on many of his adventures, along with three robots Restin has built. The feature appeared in Eerie #82-85, #87-96, #98-105, 132, #134 and #136, Vampirella #70, and Warren Comics Presents #2, as well as in the 14-issue series The Rook.

"Darklon the Mystic" - Story and art by Jim Starlin and is not to be confused with the Jim Starlin character Zyzygy Darklock. The first story about each character had the same title, "The Price". Darklon appeared in Eerie #79, 80, 84, and 100.
