= Esteban Maroto =

Spanish comic book artist (born 1942)

- Born: 1942 (age 83–84) Madrid, Spain
- Areas: Penciller, Inker
- Notable works: 1984; Creepy; Eerie; Vampirella

Esteban Maroto (born 1942) is a Spanish comic book artist.

== Career ==
Born in Madrid, he began his career in the 1960s with series like Cinco por infinito, published in English by Continuity Comics as Zero Patrol (heavily retouched by editor Neal Adams).

'Wolff' by Maroto was published in the UK by New English Library in the magazine Dracula. Dracula was published in the US by the Warren Publishing Company under the title Dracula Book 1 in 1972; the cover was by Esteban Maroto.

In the 1970s he started to be known in his own country when the magazine Trinca published Alma de Dragón. He designed the "metal bikini" for the character Red Sonja, in Savage Tales #3, Comixscene #5, and in the first issue of The Savage Sword of Conan and pencilled her first solo story, which was inked by Neal Adams and Ernie Chan. He also redesigned Satana for Marvel Comics and drew her second solo story in Vampire Tales #3. In issue 4 of the same series he drew an outstanding adaptation of the short story "The Drifting Snow" by August Derleth.

Maroto joined Warren Publishing in November 1971 when artists from the Spanish agency Selecciones Ilustradas started appearing in their three horror magazines, Creepy, Eerie and Vampirella. Maroto's first story, "Wolfhunt", appeared in Vampirella #14. He would eventually draw 101 stories for them, more than any other artist except Jose Ortiz. Maroto won the Warren Award for best artist/writer in 1972, and his story "A Scream in the Forest" won the best art in a story award in 1973. Maroto remained with Warren until its folding in 1983.

Two of Maroto's series were reprinted in Eerie and Vampirella. Manly, renamed Dax the Warrior, was reprinted in issues 39–41, 43–50 and 52 of Eerie. The whole issue 59 was dedicated to Dax, reprinting the majority of these stories. His series Tomb of the Gods was reprinted in Vampirella issues 17–22.

He also contributed black and white illustrations for the Roger Zelazny book Changeling and Larry Niven's The Magic Goes Away.

Maroto subsequently worked on the series Amethyst, Zatanna, Atlantis Chronicles, The Savage Sword of Conan, Cadillacs and Dinosaurs, Dracula: Vlad the Impaler and X-Men Unlimited. In Italy, he worked for Sergio Bonelli Editore's series Brendon.

== Bibliography ==
Comics work (interior art) includes:

=== DC ===
- Amethyst #1–4 (miniseries, 1987–88)
- Atlantis Chronicles #1–7 (miniseries, 1990)
- Zatanna #1–4 (miniseries, 1993)

=== Marvel ===
- Savage Sword of Conan (Red Sonja) #1 (1974), 225, 230–233 (1994–95); (Conan) #217–218 (1994)
- Savage Tales (Red Sonja) #3 (1974)
- Vampire Tales (Satana) #3; #4 (1974)
- X-Men Unlimited (Hellfire Club) #33 (2001)

=== Warren ===
- 1984 #1–6, 20–21, 24–28 (1978–82)
- Creepy #46–47, 49–54, 64–65, 73, 80–82, 88, 92, 95–97 (1972–78)
- Eerie #36, 38–41, 43–48, 50, 52, 57–59, 63, 67
- Vampirella #14, 16–18, 20–27, 31, 34–42, 45, 49–50, 53, 57–58, 60, 62–63, 67–68, 71–72, 74, 93–94, 98–99, 102–103, 106–107, 111–112 (1971–83)

=== Other publishers ===
- Dracula: Vlad the Impaler #1–3 (Topps, 1993)
- Cadillacs and Dinosaurs #3, 6–9 (Topps, 1994)
- Verotika #3 (Verotik, 1995)
- Wizard Presents: Lady Rawhide #1/2 (Topps, 1996)
- Zero Patrol #1–2 (Continuity, 1984–85)
- Zero Patrol (vol. 2) #1–5 (Continuity, 1987–89)
- Conan the Mercenary [Illustrator]. Ace Books, 1980.
- Conan: The Treasure of Tranicos [Illustrator]. Ace Books, 1982.
- Conan: The Flame Knife [Illustrator]. Ace Books, 1981.
- Conan and the Sorcerer [Illustrator]. Ace Books, 1979.
- The King Dragon [Illustrator]. Ace Books, 1980.
- Changeling [Illustrator]. Ace Books, 1980.
- Wolff (story), in Dracula magazine, [Illustrator]. New English Library, #1–12, 1971–72.

=== Role-playing games ===
- Conan: Adventures in an Age Undreamed Of (2016, Modiphius Entertainment, inner pages illustrations by Esteban Maroto, among others)
