= Al Williamson =

American cartoonist (1931–2010)

- Born: Alfonso Williamson; March 21, 1931 New York City, U.S.
- Died: June 12, 2010 (aged 79) Upstate New York, U.S.
- Areas: Penciller, Inker
- Awards: Eisner Award Best Inker (1991, 1997); Eisner Award Hall of Fame (2000); Inkwell Awards Joe Sinnott Hall of Fame (2010)

Alfonso Williamson (March 21, 1931 – June 12, 2010) was an American cartoonist, comic book artist and illustrator specializing in adventure, Western, science fiction and fantasy.

Born in New York City, he spent much of his early childhood in Bogotá, Colombia before moving back to the United States at the age of 12. In his youth, Williamson developed an interest in comic strips, particularly Alex Raymond's Flash Gordon. He took art classes at Burne Hogarth's Cartoonists and Illustrators School, there befriending future cartoonists Wally Wood and Roy Krenkel, who introduced him to the work of illustrators who had influenced adventure strips. Before long, he was working professionally in the comics industry. His most notable works include his science-fiction/heroic-fantasy art for EC Comics in the 1950s, on titles including Weird Science and Weird Fantasy.

In the 1960s, he gained recognition for continuing Raymond's illustrative tradition with his work on the Flash Gordon comic-book series, and was a seminal contributor to the Warren Publishing's black-and-white horror comics magazines Creepy and Eerie. Williamson spent most of the 1970s working on his own credited strip, another Raymond creation, Secret Agent X-9. The following decade, he became known for his work adapting Star Wars films to comic books and newspaper strips. From the mid-1980s to 2003, he was primarily active as an inker, mainly on Marvel Comics superhero titles starring such characters as Daredevil, Spider-Man, and Spider-Girl.

Williamson is known for his collaborations with a group of artists including Frank Frazetta, Roy Krenkel, Angelo Torres, and George Woodbridge, which was affectionately known as the "Fleagle Gang". Williamson has been cited as a stylistic influence on a number of younger artists, and encouraged many, helping such newcomers as Bernie Wrightson and Michael Kaluta enter the profession. He has won several industry awards, and six career-retrospective books about him have been published since 1998. Living in Pennsylvania with his wife Corina, Williamson retired in his seventies.

Williamson was inducted into the Will Eisner Comic Book Hall of Fame in 2000.

== Biography ==
=== Early life and career ===
Al Williamson was born in Manhattan, New York City, New York, one of two children of Sally and Alfonso Williamson, who was of Scottish descent and a Colombian citizen. The family relocated to Bogotá, Colombia, when Al was two years old. "My father was Colombian and my mother was American," Williamson said in 1997. "They met in the States, got married and went down there. I grew up down there so I learned both English and Spanish at the same time. It was comic books that taught me to read both languages." At age nine, Williamson took an interest in comic strips via the Mexican magazine Paquin, which featured American strips as well as Underwater Empire by Argentine cartoonist Carlos Clemen. Later, Williamson was attracted to Alex Raymond's Flash Gordon strip after his mother took him to see the Flash Gordon Conquers the Universe movie serial. While living in Bogotá he met future cartoonist Adolfo Buylla, who befriended him and gave him artistic advice. At age 12, in 1943, Williamson moved with his mother to San Francisco, California; they later moved to New York.

Late 1940s sketch

In the mid-1940s Williamson continued to pursue his interest in cartooning and began to take art classes with Tarzan cartoonist Burne Hogarth, and later at Hogarth's Cartoonists and Illustrators School. There he met future cartoonists Wally Wood and Roy Krenkel. According to Williamson, "Roy broadened my collecting horizons, he became my guide to all the great illustrators — the artists who directly influenced adventure cartoonists like [Alex] Raymond and [Hal] Foster. He showed me J.C. Coll, Franklin Booth, Joseph Franke, Dan Smith, Norman Lindsay, Fortunino Matania, and the great Blue Book illustrators like Herbert Morton Stoops and Frank Hoban." As he continued to learn about the cartooning field, he would visit the comic-book publisher Fiction House, meeting such artists as George Evans, Bob Lubbers, John Celardo, and Mort Meskin.

Williamson's first professional work may have been helping Hogarth pencil some Tarzan Sunday pages in 1948, although Williamson, who had initially believed so, reconsidered in a 1983 interview and recalled that his Tarzan work had come after his first two pieces of comic-book art: providing spot illustrations for the story "The World's Ugliest Horse" in Eastern Color's seminal series Famous Funnies #166 (May 1948), and a two-page Boy Scouts story, his first comics narrative, in New Heroic Comics #51 (Nov. 1948). (Williamson is also identified as co-penciler, with Frank Frazetta, of a three-page crime story, "The Last Three Dimes", in Standard Comics' Wonder Comics #20 [Oct. 1948].) Williamson explained that while Hogarth had offered him Tarzan work, Williamson "just couldn't do it. ... I couldn't get it into my little brain that he wanted me to do it exactly the way that he did it," and instead successfully recommended Celardo, artist of the Tarzan-like feature "Ka'a'nga" in Fiction House's Jungle Comics. As Williamson recalled:

...Hogarth got in touch with [Celardo], and the next thing you knew, he was penciling the Sunday page for him. He did it for quite some time and something must have happened ... but at that point I was going to the Hogarth school again in the evenings ... and he asked me again if I would like to give it a try, so I said OK. He gave me a page and he had already laid it out, so I just tightened it up. Then he gave me another page that I tightened up and he inked it. Then I said I'd like to try laying it out myself and asked if I could do that, and he said, 'Go ahead, Al,' and handed me the script. So I laid that page out on a sketchpad. He said fine and just made a couple of suggestions as to what I should do; then I just did it on the big Sunday page, and when I was through, he inked it and the other one I had done the same way, and that was it.

During this period Williamson met his main stylistic influence, Raymond: "I had just turned 18. I had been in the business about six months or so. He gave me about two hours."

=== 1950s ===
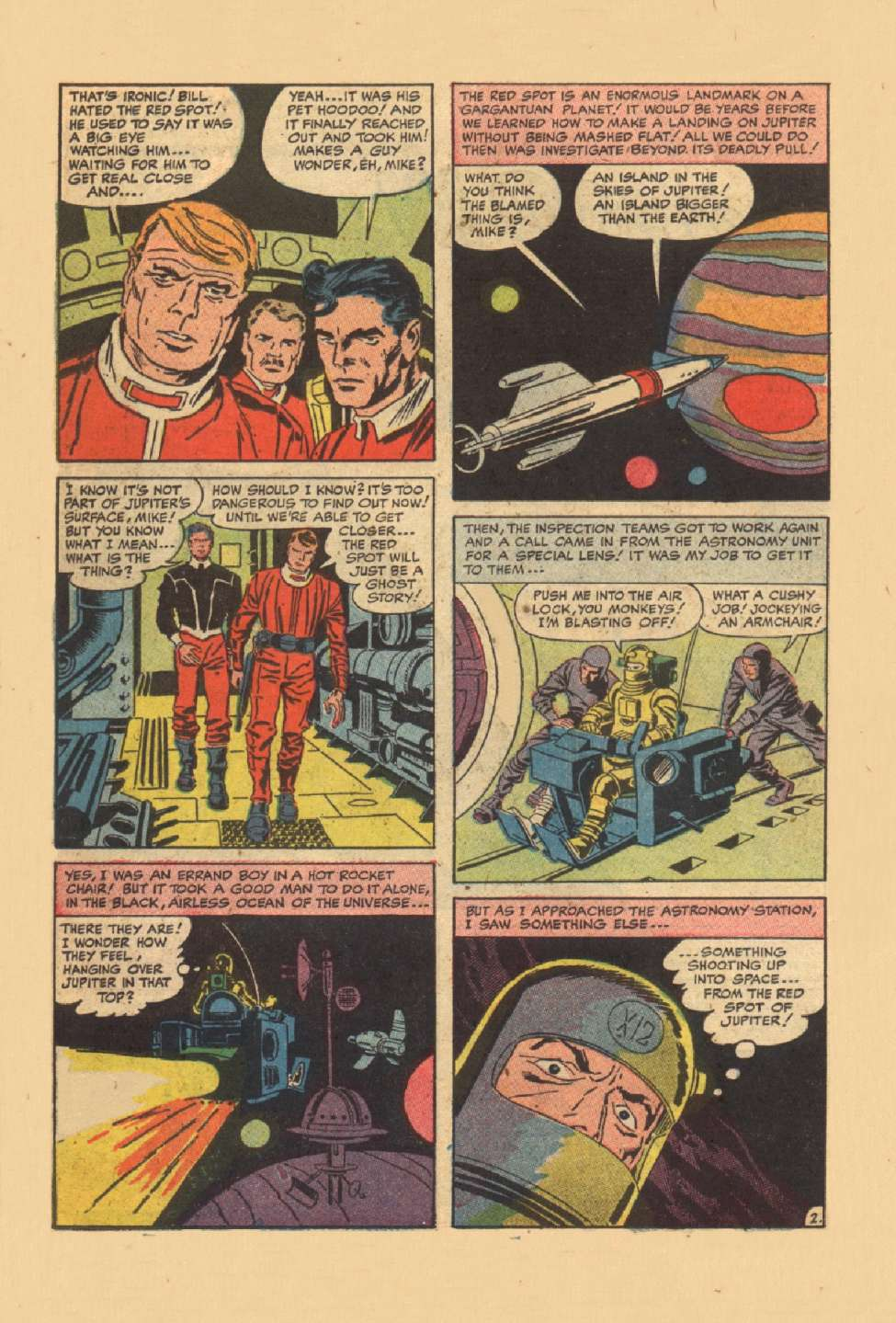
Race for the Moon #2 (September 1958), art by Jack Kirby and Al Williamson.

From 1949 to 1951, Williamson worked on science-fiction and Western stories for publishers such as American Comics Group (AGC), Avon Publications, Fawcett Comics, Standard Comics, and, possibly, Toby Press. He began collaborating with Frank Frazetta, who often inked his work; and with Roy Krenkel, who often did backgrounds. Examples of his work from that period include "Chief Victorio's Last Stand", in Avon's Chief Victorio's Apache Massacre (no number, no month, 1951); "Death in Deep Space", in Magazine Enterprises' Jet #4 (no month, 1951); and "Skull of the Sorcerer", in ACG's Forbidden Worlds #3 (Dec. 1951), inked by Wally Wood.

Five Williamson panels from "50 Girls 50", in EC Comics' Weird Science #20 (Aug. 1953).

In 1952, upon the suggestion of artists Wally Wood and Joe Orlando, Williamson began working for EC Comics, an influential comic book company with a reputation for quality artists. While at EC, Williamson frequently collaborated with fellow artists Frank Frazetta, Roy Krenkel and Angelo Torres, a group which, along with Nick Meglin and George Woodbridge, became affectionately known as the "Fleagle Gang", named after a notorious criminal gang. Williamson primarily worked on EC's science-fiction comics Weird Science, Weird Fantasy, and Weird Science-Fantasy, illustrating both original stories, primarily by writer Al Feldstein, and adaptations of stories by authors such as Ray Bradbury and Harlan Ellison, but his work occasionally appeared in EC's horror and crime comics as well.

Williamson worked at EC through 1956 until the cancellation of most of the company's line. Williamson's EC art has been lauded for its illustrative flamboyance, evident in such stories as "I, Rocket", in Weird Fantasy #20 (Aug. 1953), co-penciled and co-inked with Frank Frazetta; and "50 Girls 50", in Weird Science #20 (Aug. 1953), co-inked by Williamson and Frazetta. His final published EC story was the 10-page "A Question of Time", in Shock Illustrated #2 (Feb. 1956) with partial inking by Torres, who put his initials on the last page. In the fall of 1956, writer Larry Ivie introduced Williamson to future comics writers-editor Archie Goodwin, with whom he would become friends and, later, a frequent collaborator. Williamson eventually helped Goodwin enter the comics field, having him script a Harvey Comics story, "The Hermit", penciled by Reed Crandall and inked by Williamson.

From 1955 to 1957, Williamson produced over 400 pages of three-to-five-page stories for Atlas Comics, the 1950s forerunner of Marvel Comics, working in various genres but primarily Westerns. He continued to collaborate with Torres and Krenkel, as well as with Gray Morrow, George Woodbridge and Ralph Mayo. With Mayo, one of the first editors to give Williamson work, at Standard Comics, Williamson collaborated on the jungle girl series Jann of the Jungle #16–17 (April and June 1957). Following Mayo's death, Williamson drew stories solo for the planned #18, but the series was abruptly canceled before that issue could be published. His "prolific though somewhat uneven two-year stint at Atlas", where he first drew war comics, yielded superlative art in such stories as "The City That Time Forgot", in Marvel Tales #144 (March 1956); "Menace from the Stars", in Mystery Tales #44 (Aug. 1956); "The Unknown Ones", in Astonishing #57 (Jan. 1957); "Dreadnaught", in Navy Tales #2 (March 1957); and "Helpless", in Battle #55 (Nov. 1957). While "something appeared to be missing from a lot of his Atlas work: enthusiasm," Williamson's Atlas Westerns, at least, "form a strongly consistent body of work, characterized by minimal to nonexistent action, a preponderance of closeups and reaction shots, and well-defined figures set against sparse backgrounds."

From 1958 to 1959 Williamson worked for Harvey Comics collaborating with former EC artists Reed Crandall, Torres and Krenkel and inking the pencils of Jack Kirby (for Race to the Moon #2–3 and Blast-Off #1). On inking Kirby, Williamson relates: "I remember going up to Harvey and getting work there. They said, 'We haven't got any work for you, but we have some stories here that Jack penciled. Do you want to ink them?' I'd never really inked anybody else before, but I said, 'Sure,' because I looked at the stuff, and thought, I can follow this, it's all there. I inked it and they liked it, and they gave me three or four stories to do."

Additionally, Williamson drew stories for Classics Illustrated (in collaboration with Crandall and Woodbridge); Canaveral Press's line of Edgar Rice Burroughs books (inked by Crandall); Westerns for Dell Comics (including Gunsmoke #8–12) and Charlton Comics, including two complete issues of the Cheyenne Kid (#10–11) with Angelo Torres, and science-fiction stories for ACG, including "The Vortex", in Forbidden Worlds #69 (1958). He also worked with former EC artist John Severin on the "American Eagle" feature in Prize Comics Western #109 and #113 (1955).

Williamson's work during this decade was his most prolific in terms of comic book work and has garnered considerable praise for its high quality. He has been noted for his perfectionism and love for the medium. Despite its high reputation, S.C. Ringgenberg felt that Williamson's artwork from this period could at times be uneven and uninspired. Williamson was single during this period and, according to The Art of Al Williamson, had a bohemian and undisciplined lifestyle.

=== 1960s ===
In 1960, with little work to be found in the comic book field due to a downturn in the industry, he went to work as an assistant to John Prentice on the Alex Raymond-created comic strip Rip Kirby for a three-year period. According to Williamson: "The reason that I was called in to help him out was that John had decided to go to Mexico and Mac [Al McWilliams], John's prior assistant, didn't want to go... The deal was: would I be willing to go to Mexico?... and I said 'Si!'..." It proved to be a solid learning period for Williamson, as he credits Prentice with teaching him many fundamental illustration methods. According to Prentice: "...he was terrific. He's the best guy I ever had by far." During that time, Williamson assisted John Cullen Murphy on the Big Ben Bolt boxing strip and Don Sherwood on the strip Dan Flagg. He produced some sample pages for a proposed Sunday strip version of Modesty Blaise.

Williamson panel from King Features Flash Gordon #1 (Sept. 1966)

He returned to comics in 1965 doing one story each in Gold Key Comics' Ripley's Believe It or Not! #1 (June 1965), The Twilight Zone #12 (Aug. 1965), and Boris Karloff Tales of Mystery #11 (Sept. 1965), and helped launch Warren Publishing's black-and-white horror-comics magazines Creepy and Eerie with several stories in early issues, while contributing to Warren's war comics magazine Blazing Combat. He was instrumental in recruiting other former EC Comics artists as Frazetta, Krenkel, Torres, Crandall, and Evans, as well as artist Gray Morrow and writer-editor Archie Goodwin.

In 1966, he drew the first issue (Sept. 1966) of a new Flash Gordon comic book series, published by King Features. Williamson's work received positive reader response, and returned to draw issues #4–5 (March and May 1967), as well as the cover of #3 (Jan. 1967). Williamson received a National Cartoonist Society Best Comic Book art award for his work on that title. In 1967, on the strength of a backup feature he had done in the Flash Gordon book, he took over another Alex Raymond creation, the long-running Secret Agent X-9 comic strip, collaborating with writer Goodwin. At the start of their tenure, the title was changed to Secret Agent Corrigan.

Williamson helped assemble the first major book on Alex Raymond's Flash Gordon, published by Nostalgia Press in 1967, and wrote the introduction. In 1966, Wally Wood's alternative-press comic book witzend #1 published Williamson's "Savage World", a 1956 story originally drawn for a Buster Crabbe comic book that had been cancelled. With significant contributions by Frazetta, Krenkel, and Torres, the story is a prime sample of the "Fleagle Gang" style and has since been reprinted by Marvel Comics (in the black-and-white comics magazine Unknown Worlds of Science Fiction #1, January 1975), Pacific Comics and Kitchen Sink Press. Wood would later write the script for a three-page story drawn by Williamson, "The Tube", in another alternative-press comic, publisher Flo Steinberg's Big Apple Comix (1975).

By the end of the decade, Williamson was beginning to encourage younger artists whom he would meet at comic book conventions, helping Bernie Wrightson to enter the comics profession.

=== 1970s ===
This Secret Agent Corrigan panel (December 1, 1972) shows Williamson's skill with inking and contrasting techniques.

Williamson worked on Secret Agent Corrigan through the 1970s until he left the strip in 1980. The first Corrigan anthology was published in France in 1975, Le FBI joue et gagne, reprinting Williamson's first episode on the feature. He returned to Warren Publishing in 1976 and again in 1979 to draw three additional stories in Creepy (#83, 86, 112). These were published in France in the collection Al Williamson: A la fin de l'envoi in 1981.

He drew a few more stories for Gold Key Comics, in Grimm's Ghost Stories #5 and 8 (Aug. 1972, March 1973), and The Twilight Zone #51 (Aug. 1973), as well two mystery stories for DC Comics, in The Witching Hour #14 (May 1971), with inker Carlos Garzon, and House of Mystery #185 (April 1970), with Michael Kaluta, another artist whom he helped enter the professional field, assisting him. Comics historian Les Daniels noted that "Williamson's atmospheric technique, which relied on subtle textures as much as hard lines, was not typical of traditional DC art" and that editor Joe Orlando "got complaints from the production department" over using Williamson's art. He drew various Flash Gordon illustrations. In the burgeoning fan movement, Williamson became an early subject of comics historians with the publication of Jim Vadeboncoeur's Al Williamson: His Work in 1971 and the "Al Williamson Collector" by James Van Hise and Larry Bigman, featured in the fanzine Rocket's Blast Comicollector in the early 1970s. Samples of his sketches appear in various fanzines of the period. Marvel Comics began regularly reprinting Williamson's 1950 Atlas Comics Western stories, starting with The Ringo Kid #1 (Jan. 1970) and Kid Colt Outlaw #147 (June 1970), further introducing Williamson's early work to a latter-day generation.

=== 1980s ===
After leaving the Secret Agent Corrigan daily strip, he illustrated the Marvel Comics adaptation of The Empire Strikes Back with Carlos Garzon, as well as the 50th issue of the monthly Star Wars comic. Williamson was Lucasfilm's first choice as illustrator for the Star Wars newspaper comic strip, a project Williamson had been offered years earlier but had declined to take on at the time. He was offered the Empire Strikes Back adaptation upon Lucasfilm's specific request, as George Lucas had an appreciation of Williamson's EC Comics and Flash Gordon work. Writer Archie Goodwin cited "the comfort of knowing that I would be working with Al Williamson, an old friend that I've worked with over the years. He was absolutely the best Star Wars artist you could ever want to have. That makes it easier because you feel that whatever you do as a writer, you have an artist that will make it look great. He's also an artist that Lucasfilm kind of begged and pleaded for and always wanted to have do Star Wars material. There was that comfort factor in it as well."

A comic book adaptation of the Dino De Laurentiis' film, Flash Gordon, written by Bruce Jones and illustrated by Al Williamson, was released by Western Publishing in both hardcover and softcover formats to coincide with the film's release. A photograph of actor Sam J. Jones, who played Flash Gordon, was pasted into the original cover art. It was serialized in three issues of Whitman's Flash Gordon comic book, #31–33, March–May 1981. Alden McWilliams inked the backgrounds for the last 25 pages. According to Williamson, "It was the hardest job I ever had to do in my life." He then began drawing the Star Wars comic strip in February 1981 following Alfredo Alcala's tenure, with Goodwin writing. He drew the daily and Sunday feature until March 11, 1984, when the strip was canceled. Williamson's daily strips on this series were completely reprinted in Russ Cochran's three-volume slipcase edition in 1991.

Returning to comic books full-time for the first time since 1959, Williamson began work for Pacific Comics, collaborating with writer Bruce Jones for the Alien Worlds title (#1, 4, 8), and "Cliff Hanger", a six-issue adventure-strip backup feature in the Somerset Holmes miniseries. For Marvel, he illustrated the Blade Runner and Return of the Jedi movie adaptations. The two Archie Goodwin stories he illustrated for Epic Illustrated ("Relic" in issue #27, 1984; and "Out of Phase", in #34, 1986) have been considered to be some of his finest work, and Williamson himself named "Relic" as one of his best works. The letterer on all these projects was Ed King. Williamson drew a short story for Timespirits #4 (April 1985) and the full issue of Star Wars #98 (Aug. 1985). For DC Comics, he penciled and inked an eight-page story by Elliot S. Maggin for Superman #400 (Oct. 1984) and he inked Rick Veitch on the classic, oft reprinted Alan Moore Superman/Swamp Thing story "The Jungle Line" in DC Comics Presents #85 (Sept. 1985).

Following the expiration of his contract on the Star Wars newspaper strip, Williamson found that the weight of doing both pencil and inks suddenly became stressful to him, drastically reducing his output. As a response to this, in the mid-1980s Williamson made a successful transition to becoming strictly an inker, beginning at DC Comics inking Curt Swan on Superman #408–410 and #412–416. The longtime Man of Steel artist would later describe Williamson as "his favorite inker". Williamson then moved to Marvel where he inked such pencillers such as John Buscema, Gene Colan, Rick Leonardi, Mike Mignola, Pat Oliffe, John Romita Jr., Lee Weeks, and many others. John Romita Sr., Marvel's art director during that time, considered Williamson to be "one of the best pencillers in the world but he really can't make a living at penciling because he wants to do these beautifully pencilled pages with ample time to do them. That's why Al is inking now ... and adding a greater dimension to the penciller he's working with." He won nine industry awards for Best Inker between 1988 and 1997.

=== 1990s ===
Williamson promotional art for cover of Dark Horse Comics' Classic Star Wars: Han Solo at Star's End (1997)

Williamson provided the covers and additional artwork for Dark Horse Comics' 20-issue Classic Star Wars (Aug. 1992 – June 1994), which reprinted his Star Wars daily strips. He later inked the Star Wars: Episode I – The Phantom Menace and A New Hope film adaptations for the company. Through 2003, he was active as inker on several Marvel Comics titles, including Daredevil (#248–300), Spider-Man 2099 (#1–25), and Spider-Girl (#1–61), and such non-superhero projects as the four-issue Marvel / Epic Comics miniseries Atomic Age (Nov. 1990 – Feb. 1991), penciled by Mike Okamoto, one of the works for which Williamson won a 1991 Eisner Award for Best Inker. Daredevil penciler John Romita Jr. recalled that, "Working with Al Williamson was much like working with my father [comics artist John Romita Sr.] in that I felt that I was protected from mistakes. ... If my art wasn't correct, then Al would repair it. Oddly enough, Al said he never had to fix anything, claiming he just 'traced' over my pencils." In a 1988 interview Williamson indeed stated that "I'm just tracing [Romita's] pencils" and claimed that the only changes he made were occasionally leaving out an unnecessary background if he was in a rush.

In 1995, Marvel released a two-part Flash Gordon miniseries written by Mark Schultz and drawn by Williamson, which was his last major work doing both pencils and inks. Also with Schultz, he illustrated the short story "One Last Job" for Dark Horse Presents #120 (April 1997). In 1999, he drew the Flash Gordon character a final time when regular cartoonist Jim Keefe asked for his help on a Flash Gordon Sunday page.

=== Later life and career ===
Since 1998, there have been six career retrospective books published (see "Further Reading" section). Williamson cooperated with their production, with the exception of the books from Pure Imagination. He was interviewed for the 2003 Frank Frazetta documentary Painting with Fire, along with fellow surviving "Fleagle Gang" members Angelo Torres and Nick Meglin. In 2009, a Williamson-illustrated Sub-Mariner story written by Schultz and dedicated to Sub-Mariner creator Bill Everett was published. The story itself was originally drawn ten years previously. Williamson illustrated a "Xenozoic Tales" story written by Schultz that remains unpublished.

Living in Pennsylvania with his wife Corina, Williamson retired in his seventies and died on June 12, 2010, in Upstate New York. Some premature reports, based on unsubstantiated Twitter claims, erroneously gave June 13, 2010.

== Legacy ==
Williamson has been a stylistic influence on a number of younger artists such as Tom Yeates, Mark Schultz, Frank Cho, Steve Epting, Tony Harris, Jim Keefe, Dan Parsons, Dave Gibbons, and Paul Renaud.

== Awards ==
- 1966 National Cartoonists Society Award for Best Comic Book
- 1966 Alley Award for Best Pencil Work
- 1967 Alley Award for "Best Feature Story" (for "Lost Continent of Mongo" from Flash Gordon #4)
- 1969 Nova Award for excellence in illustrative art.
- 1984 Inkpot Award
- 2010 Inkwell Awards Joe Sinnott Hall of Fame Award

Harvey Award

- 1988 Al Williamson, for Daredevil, Marvel Comics
- 1989 Al Williamson, for Daredevil, Marvel Comics
- 1990 Al Williamson, for Daredevil, Marvel Comics
- 1991 Al Williamson, for Fafhrd and the Grey Mouser, Marvel Comics imprint Epic Comics
- 1993 Al Williamson, for Spider-Man 2099, Marvel Comics
- 1994 Al Williamson, for Spider-Man 2099, Marvel Comics
- 1995 Al Williamson, for Spider-Man 2099, Marvel Comics

Eisner Award

- 1989 Nominee, Best Art Team, for Daredevil, Marvel Comics, with penciler John Romita Jr.
- 1991 Winner, Best Inker
- 1996 Nominee, Best Penciller/Inker for Flash Gordon Marvel Comics imprint Marvel Select
- 1997 Winner, Best Inker, for The Amazing Spider-Man and Untold Tales of Spider-Man #17–18, Marvel Comics
- 1998 Nominee, Hall of Fame
- 1999 Nominee, Hall of Fame
- 2000 Inductee, Hall of Fame (Voter's choice)

Jack Kirby Hall of Fame

- Formally named finalist for induction in 1990, 1991, and 1992.
