= Alien Encounters (comics) =

- Cover to Eclipse Comics' Alien Encounters #1, art by Joe Chiodo.

Publication information
- Publisher: FantaCo Enterprises; Eclipse Comics
- Format: One-shot (FantaCo); Ongoing (Eclipse Comics)
- Genre: Science fiction
- Publication date: January 1981 (FantaCo); June 1985 - August 1987 (Eclipse Comics)
- No. of issues: 1 (FantaCo); 14 (Eclipse Comics)

Alien Encounters is an American science fiction anthology comic book published by FantaCo Enterprises and then Eclipse Comics. The comic debuted with FantaCo in 1981, and in 1985 was taken over by Eclipse.

== Publication history ==
The original FantaCo Alien Encounters was a 36-page 1981 one-shot black-and-white comic containing short, self-contained stories by Steve Bissette, Steve Stiles, Fred Hembeck, Mike Zeck and Howard Cruse, among others. After Pacific Comics went bankrupt in 1984, their titles were taken over by Eclipse Comics, including Bruce Jones' Alien Worlds, a similar science fiction-themed anthology. They decided to replace Alien Worlds with a new title that would feature a wider range of creators, and purchased the rights to the Alien Encounters title from FantaCo, with Ken Steacy designing the new series' logo.

Eclipse's version was a similarly sized bimonthly ongoing series edited by Cat Yronwode, and would run for 14 issues from June 1985 to August 1987; it was effectively replaced by a short-lived irregular revival of Alien Worlds. Creators who worked on the Eclipse series included Bissette, Cruse, Jones, Zeck, Ray Bradbury, John Bolton, Joe Chiodo, Richard Corben, Chuck Dixon, Gardner F. Fox, Rick Geary, Peter Ledger, David Lloyd, David Mazzucchelli, Gray Morrow, Ray Nelson, Timothy Truman and Thomas Yeates. The title featured painted pulp magazine-inspired covers by a variety of artists.

== Reception ==
Alien Encounters was sometimes criticized for featuring gratuitous nude scenes. Reviewing the fourth issue for Amazing Heroes, R.A. Jones was largely unimpressed by the lack of originality shown by the contents.

== Other media ==
The story "Nada" by Ray Nelson and Bill Wray, from Alien Encounters #6 (April 1986), was an adaptation of the story "Eight O'Clock in the Morning" by Nelson that was the inspiration for the 1988 John Carpenter film They Live.
