= Brent Anderson (illustrator) =

American comics artist

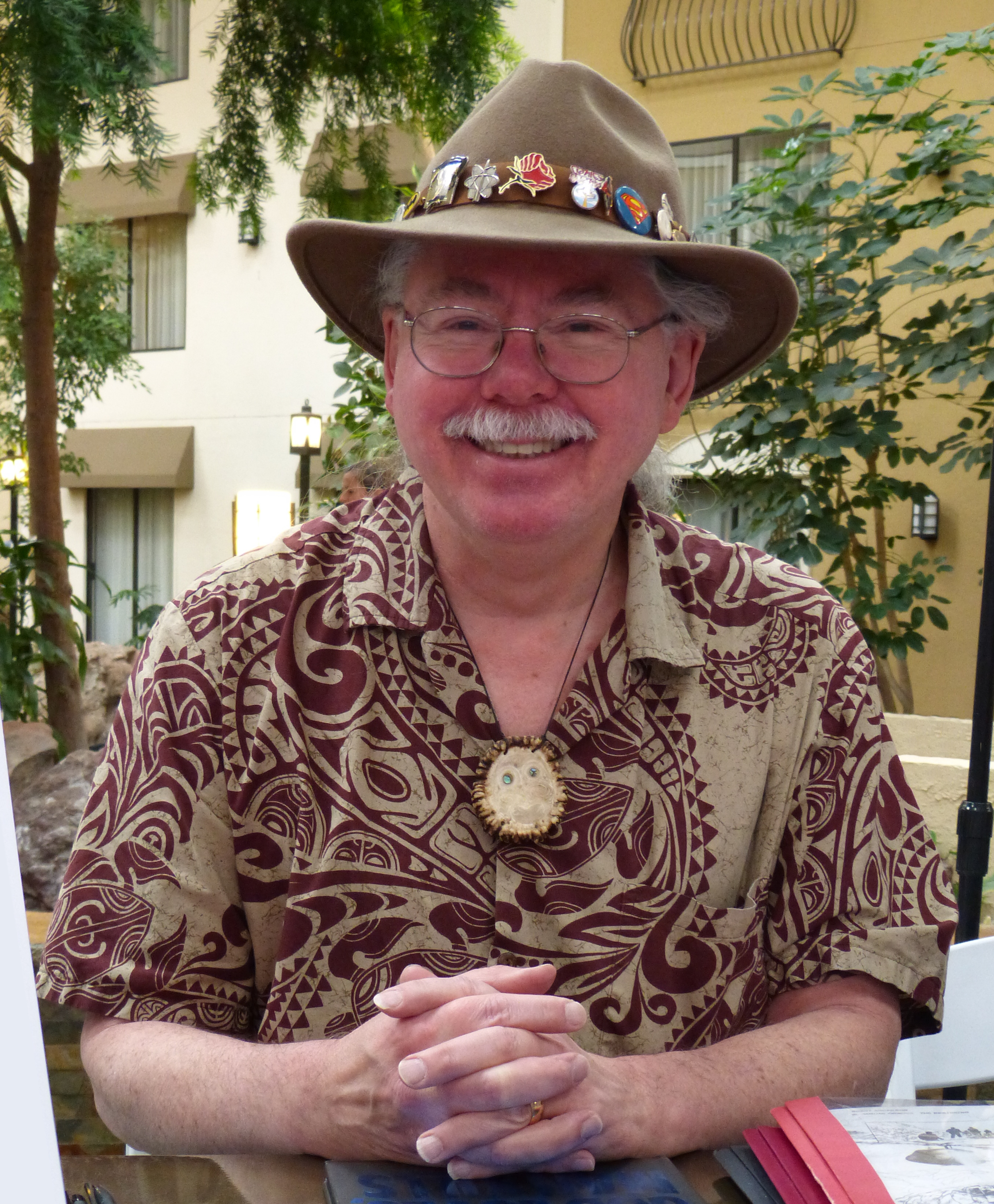
- Anderson in 2018
- Born: Brent Eric Anderson; June 15, 1955 (age 71) San Jose, California, U.S.
- Areas: Penciller, Artist
- Notable works: X-Men: God Loves, Man Kills; Astro City
- Awards: Inkpot Award, 1985; Harvey Award, 1996, 1997; Eisner Award, 1996–1998

Brent Anderson (born June 15, 1955) is an American comics artist known for his work on X-Men: God Loves, Man Kills and the comic book series Astro City.

== Early life ==
In junior high school, Brent Anderson discovered the pantheon of characters in Marvel Comics. The first Marvel comic he read was Fantastic Four #69, "By Ben Betrayed" (Dec. 1967), "They were a family who had super-powers and helped each other out. I wanted to be part of a family like that," he says. Anderson began writing and drawing his own comics on school binder paper, creating a pantheon of his own that included "Radium the Robot" and "The Chameleon". After doing fanzine illustrations, Anderson's first professional comics work appeared in the mid-1970s in independent/underground publications such as All-Slug, Tesserae, and Venture.

== Career ==
Anderson was one of several artists to draw the comics adaptation of Xanadu in Marvel Super Special #17 (Summer 1980). In 1981, Ka-Zar The Savage, written by Bruce Jones, became Anderson's first regular series. The X-Men: God Loves, Man Kills graphic novel followed, as well as artwork on a number of Marvel Comics series, including the heroic space-opera Strikeforce: Morituri. During this period, Anderson was active doing artwork for independent publishers Pacific Comics and Eclipse Comics, including the innovative cinematic comic Somerset Holmes.

In 1995, Anderson co-created with writer Kurt Busiek and cover artist Alex Ross, the award-winning Astro City. Other work included J. Michael Straczynski's Rising Stars: Untouchable spin-off series written by Fiona Avery covering the life story of special assassin Laurel Darkhaven. Work continues on a 200-plus page graphic novel, Jar of Ashes, written by Shirley Johnston. Anderson worked with writer Marv Wolfman on a one-shot featuring Green Lantern and Plastic Man entitled Green Lantern/Plastic Man: Weapons of Mass Deception, released in December 2010. A Phantom Stranger ongoing series written by Dan DiDio and drawn by Anderson began in September 2012. In June 2013, Busiek and Anderson relaunched their Astro City series as part of DC's Vertigo line. The ongoing Astro City series concluded as of issue #52 in 2018.

In April 2022, Anderson was reported among the more than three dozen comics creators who contributed to Operation USA's benefit anthology book, Comics for Ukraine: Sunflower Seeds, a project spearheaded by IDW Publishing Special Projects Editor Scott Dunbier, whose profits would be donated to relief efforts for Ukrainian refugees resulting from the February 2022 Russian invasion of Ukraine. Anderson and Kurt Busiek teamed up to contribute a new Astro City story to the anthology, which will harbor themes relevant to the events in Ukraine.

== Art style ==
Anderson's work fits into the category of "realism" defined by Neal Adams, one of Anderson's many artistic influences. Anderson's work is known for its focus on character. "My greatest joy in drawing comics comes when I've added nuance to a character with just the right expression and illustrated a scene that captures the perfect moment of mood. When the characters come to life I feel alive. That's why I've dedicated my professional life to creating comics."

== Awards ==
- Inkpot Award, 1985
- Eisner Award
  - Best New Series, 1996
  - Best Single Issue, 1996, 1997, 1998
  - Best Continuing Series, 1997, 1998
  - Best Serial Story, 1998
- Harvey Award
  - Best New Series, 1996
  - Best Single Issue or Story, 1996
  - Best Graphic Album, previously released work, 1997
- Don Thompson Award
  - Best Achievement by Penciler, 1996
  - Favorite Single Creative Team (with Kurt Busiek), 1998

== Bibliography ==
=== DC Comics ===
- 9-11: The World's Finest Comic Book Writers & Artists Tell Stories to Remember, Volume Two (2002)
- Action Comics vol. 2 #2 (2011)
- Anima #7 (1994)
- Batman: Gotham Knights #46 (2003)
- Batman: Legends of the Dark Knight #31 (1992)
- Batman: Turning Points #4 (2001)
- Fanboy #3 (1999)
- Gen^{13}: Medicine Song #1 (2001)
- Green Lantern Legacy: The Last Will & Testament of Hal Jordan HC (2002)
- Green Lantern/Plastic Man: Weapons of Mass Deception #1 (2011)
- Judge Dredd: Legends of the Law #1–4 (1994–1995)
- Night Force vol. 2 #1–3 (1996–1997)
- Phantom Stranger vol. 4 #0, #1–2, 4–5 (2012–2013)
- Silver Age: Green Lantern #1 (2000)
- Superboy Annual #4 (1997)
- Superman #90–91, 185 (1994–2002)
- Who's Who: The Definitive Directory of the DC Universe #2, 4–5 (1985)
- Wonder Woman Annual #4 (1995)

==== Vertigo ====
- Astro City vol. 3 #1–11, 13–16, 18–21, 23–24, 26, 29–30, 32–34, 37–38, 41, 43, 45–46, 49–52 (2013–2018)

==== Wildstorm ====
- Astro City vol. 2 #16–22 (1999–2000)
- Astro City: A Visitor’s Guide #1 (2004)
- Astro City: Local Heroes #1–5 (2003–2004)
- Astro City: The Dark Age Book One #1–4 (2005)
- Astro City: The Dark Age Book Two #1–4 (2007)
- Astro City: The Dark Age Book Three #1–4 (2009)
- Astro City: The Dark Age Book Four #1–4 (2010)
- Astro City: Supersonic
- Astro City: Samaritan (2006)
- Astro City: Beautie #1 (2008)
- Astro City: Astra #1–2 (2009)
- Astro City: Silver Agent #1–2 (2010)
- Astro City/Arrowsmith #1 (2004)
- Astro City Special #1 (2004)

=== Eclipse Comics ===
- Somerset Holmes #5–6 (1984)
- Total Eclipse #1 (1988)
- Valkyrie! #1–3 (1988)

=== Image Comics ===
- Kurt Busiek's Astro City #1–6 (1995–1996)
- Kurt Busiek's Astro City vol. 2 #1/2 , #1–15 (1996–1998)
- Kurt Busiek's Astro City: That Was Then...Special #1 (2022)

=== Marvel Comics ===
- The Avengers vol. 3 #51 (2002)
- Battlestar Galactica #21 (1980)
- Captain America vol. 3 #29 (2000)
- Fantastic Four Roast #1 (1982)
- Heroes for Hope Starring the X-Men #1 (1985)
- Hulk #23 (1980)
- Ka-Zar the Savage #1–15, 18–19 (1981–1982)
- Marvel Fanfare #30 (Moon Knight) (1987)
- Marvel Graphic Novel #5 (X-Men: God Loves, Man Kills) (1983)
- Marvel Treasury Edition #27 (Angel backup story) (1980)
- Moon Knight #33 (1983)
- Official Handbook of the Marvel Universe #6, 8–9 (1983)
- Official Handbook of the Marvel Universe Deluxe Edition #8 (1986)
- Power Pack #9–10, 13, 18–19, 21 (1985–1986)
- The Pulse #6–7 (2005)
- Punisher Movie Special #1 (1990)
- Strikeforce: Morituri #1–9, 11–15, 18–20 (1986–1988)
- Uncanny X-Men #144, 160, Annual #5 (1981–1982)
- Universe X: 4 (2000)
- Universe X: Iron Men #1 (2001)
- What If...? #34 (one page) (1982)

=== Now Comics ===
- Kato of the Green Hornet #1–2 (1991)

=== Pacific Comics ===
- Somerset Holmes #1–4 (1983–1984)

=== Slave Labor Graphics ===
- Spin World #1–4 (1997–1998)

Preceded by n/a	Ka-Zar the Savage artist 1981–1982	Succeeded by Ron Frenz
Preceded by n/a	Strikeforce: Morituri artist 1986–1988	Succeeded by Huw Thomas
Preceded by n/a	Phantom Stranger vol. 4 artist 2012–2013	Succeeded by Gene Ha
