= Somerset Holmes =

American comic book series

- Cover to Somerset Holmes collected edition, art by Brent Anderson.

Publication information
- Publisher: Pacific Comics (1983-1984); Eclipse Comics (1984)
- Schedule: Bimonthly
- Format: Limited series
- Publication date: September 1983-December 1984
- No. of issues: 6

Creative team
- Created by: Bruce Jones; April Campbell
- Written by: Bruce Jones; April Campbell
- Artist: Brent Anderson
- Colorist: Brent Anderson
- Editor: April Campbell

Somerset Holmes is a creator-owned American comic book series created by Bruce Jones and April Campbell. It was initially published as a six-issue limited series by Pacific Comics and then Eclipse Comics between 1983 and 1984.

== Creation ==
Somerset Holmes was a deliberate attempt to create a comics property that could then be sold to Hollywood as a film; the storyline, panel arrangements and scene angles were consciously cinematic. At the time Jones was already working with Pacific Comics on the anthologies Twisted Tales and Alien Worlds, and gathered further attention for a well-received run on Marvel Comics' Ka-Zar the Savage. Pacific was one of a growing number of independent comics publishers in America at the time that allowed creators to retain rights to their work, rather than the work for hire model used by larger rivals. As such Jones and Campbell would retain the rights to Somerset Holmes and directly profit from any adaptations of the work.

The physical appearance of the main character was based on Campbell, a former model and Jones' partner at the time. She posed as photo reference for the character, including the image used for the first issue's cover. Jones storyboarded the initial pages for artist Anderson, and noted Pacific gave him considerable creative control over the series.

== Publication history ==
The first issue of Somerset Holmes went on sale on July 15, 1983, and contained a brief piece showing Campbell modelling for the character with text explaining the creative process. Shortly after the fourth issue was published in April 1984, Pacific folded after suffering sustained financial problems. Most of Pacific's titles subsequently found a home at another independent, Eclipse Comics. They published the remaining two issues of Somerset Holmes in 1984 and subsequently collected all six issues in an oversized graphic album. The collection has long been out of print.

=== Planned film adaptation ===
After the first issue was published, director Harley Cokeliss, then working on Black Moon Rising, expressed an interest in adapting the story. The series was optioned by producer Ed Pressman, who considered musician Annie Lennox for the lead before offering it to Jamie Lee Curtis, but the project would slide into development hell and would not be made. Jones and Campbell's screenplay for the film however gained them agents and membership in the Screen Writers Guild. This led to both subsequently working on television and film projects.

Both Jones and Campbell would later go on to state their belief that Renny Harlin's 1996 film The Long Kiss Goodnight was plagiarised from Somerset Holmes, something Jones recalled was also noticed by Harlan Ellison. Both, however, were predated by Robert Ludlum's novel The Bourne Identity, published in 1980, which had the same premise of an amnesiac with remarkable fighting/survival skills being pursued by assailants.

== Plot ==
An amnesiac young woman is being chased by criminals intent on killing her. She attempts to stay alive while simultaneously struggling to solve the mystery of her past life and true identity - taking the assumed name Somerset Holmes from a sign advertising a housing project called Somerset Homes.

== Collected editions ==
Title	ISBN	Release date	Issues
Somerset Holmes	9780913035160	January 1986	Somerset Holmes #1-6

== Reception ==
Somerset Holmes has received generally positive reviews. Heidi MacDonald focused on reviewing the opening issues in The Comics Journal #93, noting the Alfred Hitchcock-style cinematic influences and stylings but also arguing that the series used elements which only worked as a comic, referring to the hybrid of styles as "Comicsmatics", while also gently ribbing a sequence where a character prepares to dry their face with a towel despite still having soap on it. The latter scene was also picked up on by Lars Ingebrigtsen, who broadly enjoyed the comic but felt there was a notable drop in quality between the Pacific and Eclipse issues.

In a retrospective review for Slings & Arrows, Frank Plowright gave the collected edition full marks, calling it "among the best crime-themed graphic novels published in the USA". Ed Catto called Somerset Holmes "a gorgeous comic with a gorgeous female lead". D. Aviva Rothschild was less effusive, criticising the "static" artwork and convoluted plot but admitting the series was a "page turner".
