= Alien Worlds (comics) =

Science Fiction comic anthology

- The cover of Alien Worlds #6, art by Frank Brunner.

Publication information
- Publisher: Pacific Comics 1982-1984; Eclipse Comics 1984-1988
- Schedule: Bimonthly
- Format: Anthology
- Publication date: December 1982 – May 1988
- No. of issues: 10

Creative team
- Created by: Bruce Jones
- Written by: Bruce Jones

Alien Worlds is an American science fiction anthology comic that was published by Pacific Comics and then Eclipse Comics between 1982 and 1985. It was edited by Bruce Jones and his partner April Campbell. It was a sister title to Jones' horror anthology Twisted Tales.

== Publication history ==
Alien Worlds was published on a bi-monthly schedule by Pacific Comics from December 1982 to April 1984 for eight issues, with a single issue of spin-off Three Dimensional Alien Worlds published in July 1984. After Pacific went bankrupt, two final issues were published by Eclipse Comics in November 1984 and January 1985. Eclipse considered continuing the title but instead opted to create Alien Encounters with a variety of writers. Instead Jones took Alien Worlds to Blackthorne Publishing, who produced a one-shot featuring reprints of stories taken from earlier issues. In 1987 Eclipse struck a deal with Jones & Campbell's new packaging operation Bruce Jones Associates for new prestige format bi-annual versions of Alien World, cancelling Alien Encounters to make room. Only a single issue of the new format was produced.

Following Eclipse's bankruptcy in 1995, the company's assets were purchased by Todd McFarlane. Believing that the deal included the names of the Jones/Campbell anthologies, he teased a series called Todd McFarlane's Alien Worlds in the 1998 one-shot Total Eclipse, but the comic would never appear.

== Content ==
Nearly all of the stories in Alien Worlds were written by Jones, with only a few exceptions (notably Jan Strnad's "Stoney End" in issue #8 and Frank Brunner's "The Reading!" in issue #9). For the most part Alien Worlds avoided the more intensely gruesome subject matter of Twisted Tales, which was being published at the same time, though part of Eclipse's reason for starting Alien Encounters was to cut down on the amount of sexual content. Among the cover artists for the series were John Bolton, Dave Stevens, Frank Brunner, William Stout, and Joe Chiodo.

== Features ==
=== 1982 series ===
Issue	Date	Contents
1	December 1982	"The Few and the Far" (art by Al Williamson): During an intergalactic war, two creatures on an uncharted planet keep their true forms hidden from the other via "Hypno-Screen".; "Domain" (art by Val Mayerik): The survivors of a disabled rocket on an alien world are forced to regress to prehistoric civilization under the orders of their crazed leader.; "Head of the Class" (art by Nestor Redondo): Robot students plot vengeance against their oppressive teacher.; "Talk to Tedi" (art by Tim Conrad): A super-intelligent robotic teddy bear follows its owner home after being inadvertently left behind on a planet millions of miles from Earth.
2	May 1983	"Aurora" (art by Dave Stevens): The adventures of an intergalactic female freedom fighter.; "Vicious Circle" (art by Ken Steacy): Eerie goings-on in a deep space bound space vessel.; "A Mind of Her Own" (art by Bruce Jones): Three children are marooned on an alien planet and one of them has the unwanted ability to bring her horrific thoughts to life.
3	July 1983	"The Inheritors" (art by Scott Hampton): Dolphin-like aliens from another world come to Earth to save the planet.; "Pi in the Sky" (art by Ken Steacy): Futuristic aerial dogfights.; "Dark Passage" (art by Thomas Yeates): Puppy love develops between a young boy and his robot "girlfriend".
4	September 1983	"Princess Pam" (art by Dave Stevens): A robot protects its mistress after they crash-land on an inhospitable planet.; "Girl of my Schemes" (art by Bo Hampton): A futuristic, exotic travel agency sets the stage for a comedic love story.; "One Day in Ohio" (art by Ken Steacy): A robot and a monkey are the only survivors of an apocalyptic nuclear war.; "Deep Secrets" (art by Bruce Jones): On the dark side of Alpha Centauri, a man gets revenge on his unfaithful lover.; "Land of the Fhre (art by Al Williamson): Humanity's triumph against alien invaders turns out to be the dreams of a brain dead survivor of the attack.
5	December 1983	"Lip Service" (art by John Bolton): A federation bureaucrat assigned to a six-week assignment on a leper-colony planetoid discovers to his horror the natives' praying mantis styled mating rituals.; "Game Wars" (art by Ken Steacy): Foes in a futuristic battle put aside their weapons to play card games; "Plastic" (art by Adolpho Buylla): Soldiers trapped on a planet in a meaningless war meet horrific fates as they discover who the true enemy is.; "Wasteland" (art by Thomas Yeates): A man stuck in a hospital bed watches a beacon from the future on the room's television set.
6	February 1984	"Planet Perfict" (art by Jim Sullivan and Arthur Suydam): An adventurer exploring an alien world finds a beautiful but not quite perfect woman.; "The Test" (art by Roy Krenkel and Val Mayerik): A man and a woman on a boating trip find hideous undersea monsters plotting to take over the Earth.; "Pride of the Fleet" (art by Frank Brunner and Mike Mignola): The adventures of a female warrior.
7	April 1984	"The Small World of Lewis Stillman" (art by Richard Corben): The last two adult survivors of a planet-wide alien attack come out of hiding and attempt to communicate with the savage, depraved remnants of humanity that remain: all children.; "Small Change" (art by Brent Anderson): A tiny alien piloting a Frisbee-like flying disc helps a young boy earn some cash.; "It All Fits" (art by Gray Morrow): Flesh-eating creatures attack scientists in a compound on an icy planet.; "Ride the Blue Bus (art by George Pérez): After a devastating war, a specially designed bus provides cross country tours to chosen survivors to instil in them the need to rebuild civilization.
8	November 1984	"...And Miles To Go Before I Sleep" (art by Al Williamson): As a final wish, a dying space explorer has robot-replacement created to visit his elderly parents on faraway Earth.; "Soft Boiled" (art by Paul Rivoche): A film noir-ish detective discovers his very existence is a sham created by robots.; "Collector's Item" (art by Ken Steacy): A set of trading cards reveal the mechanics of an imminent alien invasion to a young boy.; "Stoney End" (art by Rand Holmes): Doomed astronauts who have crash landed on a planet attempt to temporarily "escape" the horror of their impending deaths by reading science fiction comic books.
9	January 1985	"10 Devils" (art by Bo Hampton): Soldiers fight a horde of intelligent, advanced and heavily armed gigantic ants.; "The Reading" (art by Frank Brunner): Somewhere between time and space, an eerie tarot card reading reveals that the Earth no longer exists.; "Small Game" (art by Mike Hoffman): Miniaturized hunters kill insects for sport.; "The Maiden and the Dragon" (art by Bo Hampton): A clever young woman slays a hideous sea serpent.

=== 1987 series ===
Issue	Date	Contents
-	May 1988	"Phony Express" (art by Thom Enriquez): A newly hired postal rider on an alien outpost finds a letter in his pouch revealing his wife's adulterous ways.; "Looking For Louie" (art by Ralph Reese): The whacky adventures of human-sized cockroach space travellers.; "Boots and Jackets" (art by Eric Shanower): An old tracker gets one last chance for adventure in the jungles of a distant planet.; "In The Meadow" (art by Mike Dringenberg): While swimming in a pond, a young teenaged girl and her dog encounter an alien hunting for trophies.; "Jupiter Rising" (art by Bill Wray): One morning a man and his house-cat repeatedly stumble backwards into prehistoric time.; "Worlds Apart" (art by Bob Fingerman): An advanced frog-like alien becomes stranded on Earth.

== Revival series ==
In 2010, Jones and actor Thomas Jane announced that they were writing a revival series slated for release sometime in the future. As of 2025 no further news has emerged.
