= John Watkiss =

British artist (1961–2017)

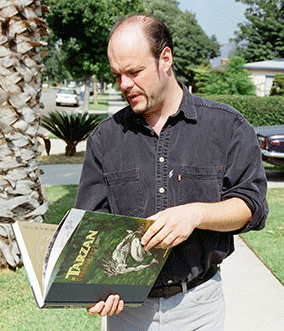
- Born: 28 July 1961; Stoke on Trent, Staffordshire, England
- Died: 20 January 2017 (aged 55); Brighton, Sussex, England
- Occupation: Artist
- Years active: 1983–2017
- Known for: Tarzan

John Watkiss (28 July 1961 – 20 January 2017) was a British artist, known for his painting and his work in comics and film production. His career led him from artist for graphic novels to storyboard artist and character designer. He is arguably best known for his visual development work on Tarzan.

== Biography ==
Watkiss was born in England in 1961. After growing up in the Midlands, he graduated from The Faculty of Arts and Architecture, Brighton University with a Bachelor of Fine Arts degree. He began his career in London as a portrait painter and illustrator, then also taught anatomy and fine art at the Royal College of Art. He worked for the Museum of the Moving Image in London, Steven Spielberg's Amblimation, Derek Jarman, Saatchi & Saatchi, Ridley Scott Associates, Francis Ford Coppola, DreamWorks, 20th Century Fox, and Disney (where he worked on the 1999 animated movie Tarzan).

One of his paintings, The Boxer, sold at Christie's in 2001, and in 2002 he was commissioned to provide a mural for the Ford Museum.

Watkiss' comics illustration work includes DC Comics' The Sandman #39 (1992) and #52 (1993), Sandman Mystery Theatre #5–8 (1993), Starman #18 (1996), and all 13 issues of Deadman written by Bruce Jones (2006–2007); Ring of Roses (1992) written by Das Petrou; and various Conan comics (1993–1995) for Dark Horse; John Jakes' Mullkon Empire for Tekno Comix (1995); and Surgeon X with writer Sara Kenney (Image Comics, 2016).

Watkiss died of cancer at the age of 55.
