= Deadman (Vertigo) =

Comic book series by Bruce Jones

- Deadman #1 (October 2006), art by John Watkiss.

Publication information
- Publisher: DC Comics
- Schedule: Monthly
- Format: Ongoing series
- Publication date: October 2006 – November 2007
- No. of issues: 13

Creative team
- Written by: Bruce Jones
- Artist(s): John Watkiss & Ronald Wimberly
- Letterer: Jared K. Fletcher
- Colorist: Jeromy Cox

Collected editions
- Deadman Walking: ISBN 1-4012-1236-0

Deadman is a supernatural comic book series written by Bruce Jones and published by the Vertigo imprint of DC Comics. The series was loosely based on the DC superhero character Deadman, although the similarities between the properties are few. The series lasted for 13 issues.

== Plot ==
Airline pilot Brandon Cayce is killed when a plane he is on crashes. Cayce, however, utterly refuses to pass on into death, and resurrects to a sort of half-life, but finds himself experiencing visions of what seem to be other realities and timelines. He meets with Sarah, his former lover and also the pregnant widow of his brother Scott, and tells her that they are being pursued by men who wish to gain possession of her unborn child. Brandon discovers that his brother had been possessed by an entity named "Devlin" while the child was being conceived, and Devlin has abducted the fetus and implanted it in the body of another woman, named Eve. Devlin's agents imprison Eve while waiting for her newfound pregnancy to come to term. Eventually, Eve gives birth to a being Devlin claims is the next step in human evolution, which will be the first human with a complete awareness of other dimensions. After giving birth, Eve is killed by her husband, although Sarah shows up and absconds with what had formerly been her baby. Attempting to reacquire the child, Devlin proposes a bargain to Brandon: take the life of the baby, in exchange for the continued lives of Brandon and Sarah. If Brandon refuses this deal, he will die. Nobly, Brandon chooses death to allow Sarah and the child to live free.

== Collected editions ==
Only the first five issues have been released in trade paperback, under the title Deadman: Deadman Walking (ISBN 1-40121-236-0).
