= Ring of Roses =

1992 graphic novel

Ring of Roses is a graphic novel originally created by writer Das Petrou and artist John Watkiss and published by Dark Horse Comics in 1992. Essentially, this is a murder mystery set in 1991 London, but in an alternate reality where the Catholic Church is incredibly powerful, to the point of limiting science and technology to levels similar to World War II. There are shades of Dan Brown's The Da Vinci Code here although published 11 years before Brown's book.
