= Gray Morrow =

American illustrator (1934–2001)

- Born: Dwight Graydon Morrow; March 7, 1934 Fort Wayne, Indiana, U.S.
- Died: November 6, 2001 (aged 67) Kunkletown, Pennsylvania, U.S.
- Areas: Penciller, Inker
- Notable works: Tarzan, Buck Rogers, Flash Gordon, The Illustrated Roger Zelazny
- Awards: Nominated for Hugo Award in 1966, 1967, and 1968

Dwight Graydon "Gray" Morrow (March 7, 1934 – November 6, 2001) was an American illustrator of comics, magazine covers and paperback books. He was the co-creator of the Marvel Comics muck-monster the Man-Thing and of DC Comics Old West vigilante El Diablo.

== Biography ==
=== Early life and career ===
Morrow was born March 7, 1934, in Fort Wayne, Indiana, and he attended North Side High School. He recalled in 1973 that, "Comic art was certainly the first artform I remember being impressed with ... [T]hose gorgeous gory newsstand spreads ..." After serving as editor of his high-school yearbook, for which he did cartoons and illustration, and working a number of odd jobs including "soda jerk, street repairman, tie designer, exercise boy on the race track circuit, etc.," he enrolled in the Chicago Academy of Fine Arts in Chicago, Illinois, in late summer 1954, studying two nights a week for three months under Jerry Warshaw for "the total of my entire formal art training." His first formal commission "was something like a bank ad or a tie design when I was still in my teens." He joined the city's Feldkamp-Malloy art studio, later being fired. Feeling encouraged by a meeting with comic-strip artist Allen Saunders, Morrow submitted strip samples to various syndicates with no luck.

Undaunted, he moved to New York City in winter 1955 and by the following spring had met fellow young comics artists Al Williamson, Angelo Torres, and Wally Wood. He sold his first comic-book story, a romance tale, to Toby Press, which went out of business before it could be published. Morrow next did two stories for another company — a Western with original characters and an adaptation of pulp-fiction writer Robert E. Howard's "The Tower of the Elephant", but this company, too, went defunct. He then worked for Williamson and Wood doing backgrounds and layouts, and through Williamson began contributing to Atlas Comics, the 1950s iteration of Marvel Comics, drawing several supernatural-fantasy stories plus at least four Westerns and one war story on titles cover-dated July 1956 to June 1957.

Morrow illustrated several stories for EC Comics in the 1950s, including horror, suspense and science fiction. He later did covers and stories for the company's New Trend comics and Picto-Fiction magazines.

In late 1956, Morrow was drafted into the U.S. Army. Stationed at Incheon and Wolmido Island, South Korea, with Fox Company, he did "illustrations and paintings for the officers' club, day rooms, insignias on helmets for their parades ... you know, anything and everything. That was my official duty." After being discharged in 1958, "My friend Angelo Torres took me around to a couple of his clients, one being 'Classics' [i.e., the Gilberton Company, publisher of the Classics Illustrated comic-book series of literary adaptations], and I was given a script. One thing led to another and I was soon working on a regular basis.

Prior to his Gilberton stint, Morrow contributed to one of the first black-and-white horror-comics magazines, the Joe Simon-edited Eerie Tales #1 (Nov. 1959) from Hastings Associates, penciling and inking two four-page stories by an unknown writer, "The Stalker" and "Burn!"

=== 1960s to 1970s ===
In the early 1960s, Morrow anonymously illustrated three literary adaptations for Classics Illustrated: The Octopus by Frank Norris (#159, Nov. 1960); Master of the World by Jules Verne (#163, July 1961); and The Queen's Necklace by Alexandre Dumas (#165, Jan. 1962), which he said he penciled and inked at the rate of "eight pages a day ... as fast as I've ever been able to go" since "I'd moved to California and needed those checks badly." Morrow also supplied drawings for chapters in Classics Illustrated Special Issue #159A, Rockets, Jets and Missiles (Dec. 1960), and in 13 World Around Us issues ranging from Prehistoric Animals (Nov. 1959) to Famous Teens (May 1961). One of those, #W28, Whaling (Dec. 1960), resulted in unexpected controversy when he accurately depicted African-American whalers:

[T]he page rate [at Gilberton in general] wasn't much for the accuracy and authenticity they expected, but it was a challenge to 'do it right.' Roberta and Len Cole were demanding but genial editors. One job I do remember ... something about whaling, got me in dutch [i.e. trouble] with Roberta. My research indicated that many of the whalers were black — so that's what I drew. She had a fit and insisted they all be redrawn to 'avoid controversy.'

In the end, the problematic chapter, "The Long Voyage", retained what one comics historian called "a respectable number of African-American whalemen." Morrow, however, recalled, "[T]hey had me make them all white. I had to change their features."

Concurrently, Morrow also illustrated entries in the Bobbs-Merrill juvenile book series "Childhood of Famous Americans", continuing with that publisher after Gilberton ceased production of new titles. Morrow's art appears in Henry Clay: Young Kentucky Orator (1963), Douglas MacArthur: Young Protector and other entries. Some, including Crispus Attucks, Black Leader of Colonial Patriots, Teddy Roosevelt, Young Rough Rider, and Abner Doubleday: Young Baseball Pioneer, were reprinted by successor publishers in the 1980s and 1990s.

Morrow next began a three-year association with Warren Publishing's line of black-and-white horror-comics magazines in 1964, starting with the six-page story "Bewitched!," written by Larry Ivie, in Creepy #1, and contributed over a dozen stories to that magazine and its sister publication Eerie, as well as to the war-comics magazine Blazing Combat, through 1967. He also painted four horror covers for Warren. For competitor Skywald Publications, he drew the eight-page "The Skin And Bones Syndrome" for Psycho #1 (Jan. 1971), and co-created the muck-monster Man-Thing, with writers Roy Thomas and Gerry Conway, in Marvel Comics' first entry into the adult-oriented comics-magazine market, the black-and-white Savage Tales #1 (May 1971).

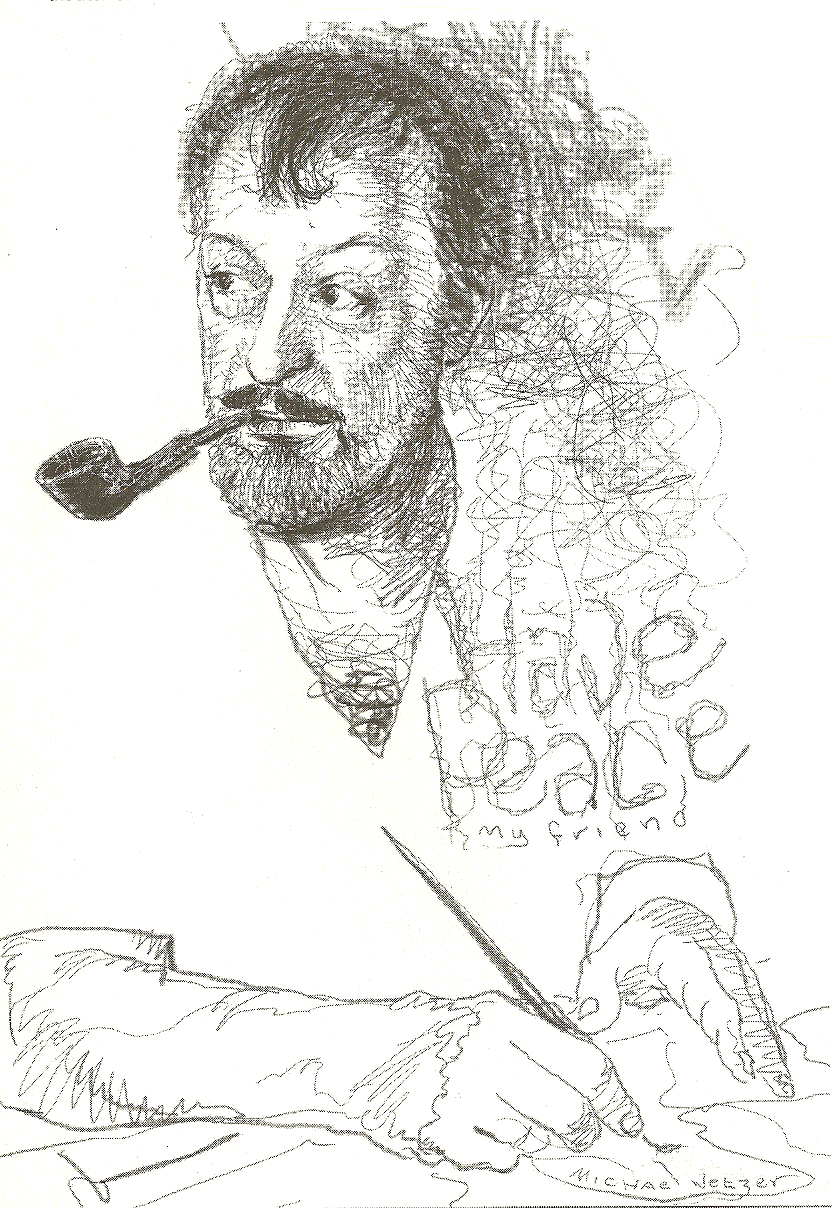
Gray Morrow by Michael Netzer

By 1970, Morrow was married to Betty Morrow, who wrote a story he drew, "The Journey", in the early independent comic witzend #7 (1970). That same year he returned to color comics, drawing several supernatural-fantasy stories for DC Comics' Witching Hour, House of Secrets and House of Mystery, as well as a smattering of romance and superhero tales. He also drew Western stories, and with writer Robert Kanigher co-created the Old West vigilante El Diablo in All-Star Western #2 (Oct. 1970). He did a small amount of work for Marvel during this time, with the cover and a romance story for My Love #14 (Nov. 1971), a Man-Thing cover and story in Adventure into Fear #10 (Oct. 1972), two "Gullivar Jones, Warrior of Mars" stories in Creatures on the Loose #20-21 (Nov. 1972 - Jan. 1973), and virtually his only Marvel superhero story, a 10-page Falcon feature in Captain America #144 (Dec. 1971).

By 1973, Morrow had served as an uncredited ghost artist or art assistant on the syndicated comic strips Rip Kirby by John Prentice, Secret Agent X-9 by Al Williamson and Big Ben Bolt by John Cullen Murphy. He took over the Buck Rogers strip in 1979 and the Tarzan Sunday strip from 1983 to 2001. He recalled trying out for Prince Valiant, saying he provided a sample "when [strip creator] Hal Foster decided to go into semi-retirement. It was done in August and published in October or November of '71. It was done as a sample when Foster interviewed [me] and a couple of others (Wally Wood and John Cullen Murphy) to take over."

Through 1974 and early 1975, he edited and frequently drew stories for Archie Comics' imprint of non-teen-humor titles, Red Circle Comics, including Chilling Adventures in Sorcery, its successor Red Circle Sorcery, and the single-issue The Super Cops, based on two real-life New York City Police Department detectives. Following this, he specialized in covers and stories for such black-and-white Marvel magazines as Masters of Terror, Unknown Worlds of Science Fiction and Marvel Preview. Afterward, through 1976, he was art director of Charlton Comics' black-and-white magazine Space: 1999, based on the TV series of that name. Active in the early independent comics of the 1970s, Morrow contributed mostly spot illustrations, covers and pinups rather than stories to titles including publisher David Jablin's Imagination #1 (1971); Mark Feldman's I'll Be Damned #4 (1971); John Carbonaro's Phase #1 (Sept. 1971); Doug Murray & Richard Garrison Heritage #1A and 1B (1972); and Gary Berman & Adam Malin's Infinity #2, 3B, 4-5 (1970?-1973).

Perry Rhodan #20: The Thrall of Hypno (Ace Books, 1972). Cover art by Morrow

In 1978, he began publishing, in Heavy Metal magazine, a series of stories that would be collected in 2012 as chapters of the sword and sorcery graphic novel Orion. Likewise, his Playboy feature "Amora", which he both wrote and drew, was collected as Heritage presents ... Amora, from the Forest Park, Georgia publisher Heritage in 1971. He illustrated and colored each of the several Roger Zelazny stories that the author self-adapted for the 96-page graphic short-story collection The Illustrated Roger Zelazny, produced by Byron Preiss Enterprizes and published by Baronet Publishing in February 1979.

In addition to comics, Morrow in the 1960s and 1970s was an illustrator for many science-fiction magazines, with examples of his work gracing most of the covers of the American version of the Perry Rhodan paperback-book series. He did regular interior artwork for Galaxy Science Fiction from 1964 to 1968 including the illustrations for the original Galaxy Science Fiction publication of the Hugo-winning novella Soldier, Ask Not by Gordon R. Dickson. Additionally, he drew for satirical-humor magazine National Lampoon

=== Later career ===
In the 1980s, he wrote and drew Pacific Comics' three-issue Edge of Chaos (July 1983 - Jan. 1984), a science-fiction retelling of the story of the Greek gods. Through the decade he did sporadic but diverse work for Marvel and DC, ranging from stories of Lois Lane to those of Mark Hazzard: Merc, as well as horror and science-fiction stories for Eclipse Comics; satirical humor for Cracked; "The Sex Vampires from Outer Space" and other stories for the same publisher's black-and-white comics magazine Monsters Attack; and Marvel Graphic Novel: Dreamwalker (1989), a 63-page superhero/espionage thriller written by actors Miguel Ferrer and Bill Mumy. He drew the comics adaptations of the Sheena and Supergirl movies in 1984. Morrow briefly drew DC's Spectre series in 1988.

The following decade, continuing his trend of wide-ranging work, he drew the superhero feature "Powerline", by writers D. G. Chichester and Margaret Clark, in several issues of the Marvel/Epic Comics anthology A Shadowline Saga: Critical Mass; inked Michael Davis on writer Mike Grell's DC Comics miniseries Shado: Song of the Dragon #1-4; contributed to DC's "The Big Book of ..." trade paperback line of non-fiction vignettes on a variety of topics; drew the Historical Souvenir Co.'s 40-page, non-fiction Epic Battles of the Civil War #2 - Shiloh (1998); drew children's Mighty Morphin Power Rangers adventurers for Hamilton Comics and adult-oriented stories for Penthouse Comix; and did work for such independent comics publishers as Aardwolf Publishing, Dark Horse Comics and NBM, and the underground comix publisher Rip Off Press. His last new work was his posthumously published contribution, with four other artists, to the 10-page story "Letters From a Broken Apple", written by Neil Kleid, in Alternative Comics' benefit one-shot 9-11 Emergency Relief (Jan. 2002).

=== Other work ===
Morrow worked in television animation, including on a Spider-Man TV series, and was a member of The Animation Guild, I.A.T.S.E. Local 839.

He painted or drew the theatrical one-sheet for the Al Adamson horror film Five Bloody Graves (1970), and drew the King Kong cover of the premiere issue of The Monster Times.

=== Personal life ===
By 1973, when he was living in Brooklyn, Morrow was married with a family that included adopted children.

He was living in Kunkletown, Pennsylvania, and suffering from Parkinson's disease when he died November 6, 2001, from a self-inflicted gunshot wound. He was survived by his later wife, Pocho Morrow.

== Awards ==
Morrow was nominated for the Hugo Award for best professional artist in 1966, 1967, and 1968. In 2005, he was posthumously inducted into the Oklahoma Cartoonists Associates Hall of Fame in Pauls Valley, Oklahoma, located in the Toy and Action Figure Museum.

== Bibliography ==
=== Books ===
- Philip José Farmer Behind the Walls of Terra. Ace Books 71135. (1970). Cover art by Gray Morrow. (Book 4 of The World of Tiers series).
- Morrow, Gray; Seuling, Phil (1970). Dark Domain. Kew Gardens, New York: Screen Facts Press.
- Morrow, Gray (1994). Babes & Bimbos: The Unseen Art of Gray Morrow. Morristown, New Jersey: C.T. Ltd. Editions.

=== Comics ===
==== Alternative Comics ====
- 9-11 Emergency Relief #1 (2002)

==== Archie Comics ====
- Archie's Super Hero Comics Digest Magazine #2 (Black Hood) (1979)
- Archie's Super Hero Special #1 (1978)
- Black Hood #1, 3 (1983)
- Blue Ribbon Comics vol 2. #8 (1984)
- Chilling Adventures in Sorcery #3–5 (1973–1974)
- Mad House #97 (1975)
- Red Circle Sorcery #6–8, 10 (full art); 11 (inks over Jim Mooney) (1974–1975)
- The Super Cops #1 (1974)
- Teenage Mutant Ninja Turtles Adventures #62, 65–66 (1994–1995)

==== Baronet Publishing ====
- The Illustrated Roger Zelazny (1979)

==== Charlton Comics ====
- Space: 1999 #1–3, 5–6, 8 (1975–1976)

==== Dark Horse Comics ====
- Dark Horse Presents #53–55 (1991)
- Dark Horse Presents Annual (1998)
- The Young Indiana Jones Chronicles #3–6 (1992)

==== DC Comics ====
- Adventure Comics #413–415 (Zatanna); #417, 422 (Vigilante) (1971–1972)
- All-Star Western #2–4, 10–11 (El Diablo) (1970–1972)
- Batman Annual #13 (inks over Michael Bair) (1989)
- Batman: Legends of the Dark Knight Annual #3 (inks over Mike Manley) (1993)
- Christmas with the Super-Heroes #2 (1989)
- DC Comics Presents #65 (Superman/Madame Xanadu) (1984)
- G.I. Combat #159–161 (1973)
- Green Arrow: The Wonder Year #1–4 (inks over Mike Grell) (1993)
- Heroes Against Hunger #1 (inks over Joe J. Brozowski) (1986)
- House of Mystery #192, 196, 255, 320 (1971–1983)
- House of Secrets #86, 89–90 (1970–1971)
- Jonah Hex #90–92 (1985)
- Lois Lane #1–2 (1986)
- Outsiders #12 (inks over Mark Beachum) (1986)
- Scarlett #5–9 (1993)
- Secret Origins vol. 2 #21 (Jonah Hex) (1987)
- Shado: Song of the Dragon #1–4 (inks over Michael Davis) (1992)
- Spectre vol. 2 #9–15 (1987–1988)
- Star Trek #28, 35–36, 56, Annual #1 (1986–1990)
- Supergirl Movie Special #1 (1985)
- Superman #238 (World of Krypton) (1971)
- Superman's Girl Friend, Lois Lane #111 (Rose and the Thorn) (1971)
- Tarzan #208 (1972)
- Who's Who in Star Trek #1–2 (1987)
- Who's Who: The Definitive Directory of the DC Universe #4, 7, 25–26 (1985–1987)
- Who's Who Update '88 #4 (1988)
- The Witching Hour #10, 13, 15–16 (1970–1971)
- World's Finest Comics #245–248 (Vigilante) (1977)
- Young Love #80, 82 (1970)
- Zatanna Special #1 (1987)

===== Paradox Press =====
- The Big Book Of Bad (1998)
- The Big Book of Hoaxes (1996)
- The Big Book of Losers (1997)
- The Big Book of the '70s (2000)
- The Big Book of the Weird Wild West (1998)
- The Big Book of Thugs (1996)
- The Big Book of Vice (1999)

==== Eclipse Comics ====
- 3-D Alien Terror #1 (1986)
- Alien Encounters #10 (1986)
- Tales of Terror #3–4 (1985–1986)
- Twisted Tales #10 (1984)

==== Fantagraphics ====
- Cosmic Kliti #1 (1991)

==== Forbidden Fruit ====
- Gray Morrow's Private Commissions #1–2 (1992)

==== Gilberton Company ====
- Classics Illustrated #159, 163, 165, 169 (1960–1969)
- Classics Illustrated Special Issue #159A (1960)
- The World Around Us #15, 18–19, 23, 25–26, 28, 30, 32 (1959–1961)

==== Globe Communications ====
- Cracked #228, 241 (1987–1988)
- Monsters Attack #1–5 (1989–1990)

==== Hamilton Comics ====
- Dread of Night #1 (1991)
- Grave Tales #1 (1991)
- Maggots #3 (1992)
- Saban's Mighty Morphin Power Rangers #1, 4, 6 (1995)

==== HM Communications, Inc. ====
- Heavy Metal #v1#10, #v1#12–13, #v2#1, #v2#3–8, #v3#1, #v3#3, #v3#5, #v6#8 (1978–1982)

==== Marvel Comics ====
- Adventure into Fear #10 (Man-Thing) (inks over Howard Chaykin) (1972)
- Astonishing #52, 61 (1956–1957)
- Barbie #32 (1993)
- Battlefront #41 (1956)
- Captain America #144 (1971)
- Creatures on the Loose #20–21 (1972–1973)
- Destroyer #3 (1992)
- Frontier Western #8 (1957)
- Heroes for Hope Starring the X-Men #1 (1985)
- Hook Magazine #1 (1992)
- Journey into Mystery #41–42 (1956–1957)
- Journey into Unknown Worlds #48 (1956)
- Kid Colt, Outlaw #60 (1956)
- Mark Hazzard: Merc #1–2, 4, 8, 10–11 (1986–1987)
- Marvel Fanfare #9 (Man-Thing) (inks over Joe J. Brozowski) (1983)
- Marvel Graphic Novel: The Dreamwalker (1989)
- Marvel Super Special #34 (Sheena) (1984)
- Marvel Tales #150, 152, 156 (1956–1957)
- Monsters Unleashed #3 (1973)
- My Love #14 (1971)
- Mystery Tales #50 (1957)
- Mystic #51 (1956)
- Power Pack #51 (1989)
- Quick-Trigger Western #18 (1957)
- Savage Tales #1–2 (1971–1973)
- Savage Tales vol. 2 #1–2, 7 (1985–1986)
- Strange Stories of Suspense #13 (1957)
- Strange Tales #52, 54, 57 (1956–1957)
- Strange Tales of the Unusual #10 (1957)
- Two-Gun Western #9–10 (1957)
- Uncanny Tales #46, 51 (1956–1957)
- Unknown Worlds of Science Fiction #5 (1975)
- Western Gunfighters #26 (1957)
- World of Fantasy #7 (1957)

===== Epic Comics =====
- Clive Barker's Hellraiser #8 (1991)
- Powerline #4–7 (1989)
- A Shadowline Saga: Critical Mass #1, 3–4, 6–7 (1990)
- Wild Cards #4 (1990)

==== Pacific Comics ====
- Alien Worlds #7 (1984)
- Edge of Chaos #1–3 (1983–1984)

==== Penthouse ====
- Penthouse Comix #2–7 (1994–1995)

==== Valiant Comics ====
- Nintendo Comics System #1 (1991)

==== Warren Publishing ====
- Blazing Combat #1–3 (1965–1966)
- Creepy #1–7, 9–10, 13, 20, 24, 26, 55, 87 (1964–1977)
- Eerie #2, 4, 15, 19 (1966–1968)

==== Wonderful Publishing Company ====
- witzend #6–7 (1969–1970)
