= Mark Hazzard: Merc =

Mark Hazzard

Publication information
- Publisher: Marvel Comics
- First appearance: Mark Hazzard: Merc #1
- Created by: Archie Goodwin

In-story information
- Alter ego: Mark Hazzard
- Abilities: West Point graduate Years of combat experience

Mark Hazzard: Merc is a comic book series published by Marvel Comics under their New Universe imprint. The series ran for twelve issues in 1986 and 1987, plus one annual.

== Publication history ==
Mark Hazzard: Merc is one of four New Universe titles created by Archie Goodwin. The initial writer for the series was Peter David, but he left after only four issues and was succeeded for the rest of the run by Doug Murray. Whereas David's run dealt with Mark Hazzard's struggles between his family and his military background, Murray focused almost entirely on Mark Hazzard's mercenary career. Though Mark Hazzard: Merc never secured a stable art team, nearly half the issues were penciled by Gray Morrow.

With the series due to be cancelled, Murray had the title character killed in Mark Hazzard: Merc Annual #1, which was published before the final issue (#12) of the regular series. As such, issue #12 was retitled simply Merc on the cover, and featured a cast of Mark Hazzard's associates in the starring role. Of the four New Universe titles that were cancelled at the end of the imprint's first year (the others being Codename: Spitfire, Kickers, Inc., and Nightmask), Mark Hazzard: Merc was the only one to publish an annual.

An eight-page special was printed in February 2006 as a backup story in Amazing Fantasy #18 as part of an Untold Tales of the New Universe event, which was created to commemorate the twentieth anniversary of the New Universe and to serve as a preamble for Warren Ellis' newuniversal re-imagining. The story was a Mark Hazzard adventure set at an unspecified time during the first half dozen issues of Mark Hazzard: Merc.

== Fictional character biography ==
Mark Hazzard's father was a career soldier who was very demanding of Mark; although Mark was generally very successful academically and as a football player, his father was perpetually disappointed in him for not being "the best". In high school, Mark met and fell in love with his future wife, Joan. After graduating from high school, he went to West Point, where he was a cadet officer. Fed up with his father - notably his disapproval of Joan - Mark dropped out, got married, and enlisted in the United States Army. Hazzard spent three tours in Vietnam, discovering something at which he was among the best: combat. While "in country", Hazzard met his future accomplices Louis "Treetop" Barrington and Sgt. Major Peel. Returning home, Mark and Joan produced a son, Scott, but Hazzard couldn't find work. Mark finally became a mercenary, then a mercenary commander. Under Hazzard's leadership, his mercenary crew tended to be more scrupulous than most in its choice of clients. Mark was happy, but his wife wasn't; she gave him an ultimatum, to choose between his life as a merc or their marriage.

After their divorce, Joan married a lawyer named Gordon. Convinced that Joan and Scott both still loved Hazzard more than him, Gordon arranged for Hazzard to be captured in Iran. Hazzard was rescued by his merc crew, and then investigated his betrayal. Tracking it back to Gordon, Hazzard strangled him but not before Gordon was able to inflict a fatal injury on Hazzard. Taken to a hospital, Hazzard was removed from life support at Scott's request; Scott believed his father would prefer it that way.

== Mark's Shop ==
- Louis "Treetop" Barrington - pilot during the Vietnam War.
- The Doc - South Vietnamese army field medic, after the war she moved to America.
- Lincoln "Stryker" Griffin - former Navy SEAL, during the Vietnam War, now used his skills with Mark Hazzard.
- Sgt. Major Peel - a man who found himself in mercenary work after the Vietnam War. He hired Mark Hazzard to help teach Afghanistan insurgents to fight in 1980's.
- The Priestess - a fourteen-year-old runaway whose life was saved by Mark Hazzard.
- Ritter - ex-Air Force who now used his skills for personal profit.
- Mal Rossi - Mark Hazzard's oldest and best friend, a New Zealander who could not deal with "regular" life, became alcoholic and lecherous, but was saved by Mark, who gave him a regular paying job using his combat skills.

== Writers ==
- Peter David - Mark Hazzard: Merc #1-4 (November 1986-February 1987)
- Doug Murray - Mark Hazzard: Merc #5-12 (March 1987-October 1987); Mark Hazzard: Merc Annual #1 (1987)
- Tony Lee - Mark Hazzard: Merc Amazing Fantasy #18 (February 2006)

== Pencilers ==
- Gray Morrow - Mark Hazzard: Merc #1-2, 8, 10-11 (November 1986-December 1986, June 1987, August 1987-September 1987)
- Alan Kupperberg - Mark Hazzard: Merc #3-4 (January 1987-February 1987)
- Mark Beachum - Mark Hazzard: Merc #5 (March 1987)
- Vincent Giarranno - Mark Hazzard: Merc #6, 12 (April 1987, October 1987)
- Val Mayerik - Mark Hazzard: Merc #7 (May 1987)
- Andy Kubert - Mark Hazzard: Merc #9 (July 1987)
- Vincent Waller - Mark Hazzard: Merc Annual #1 (1987)
- Leonard Kirk - Mark Hazzard: Merc Amazing Fantasy #18 (February 2006)
