= Herbert Morton Stoops =

American illustrator and painter (1888–1948)

- Born: 1888; Logan, Utah, US
- Died: May 19, 1948 (aged 60); New York City, US
- Education: Utah State College, School of the Art Institute of Chicago
- Known for: Artwork for magazines and books

Herbert Morton Stoops (1888 – May 19, 1948) was an American illustrator and painter who provided artwork for numerous magazines and books. Raised on a ranch in Idaho, Stoops began studying art formally while attending college in Utah before attaining employment with numerous magazines. He was especially associated with the magazine Blue Book, for which he frequently provided cover artwork for thirteen years. He often depicted Western and military subjects. Stoops was a 2009 inductee into the Society of Illustrators' Hall of Fame.

== Biography ==
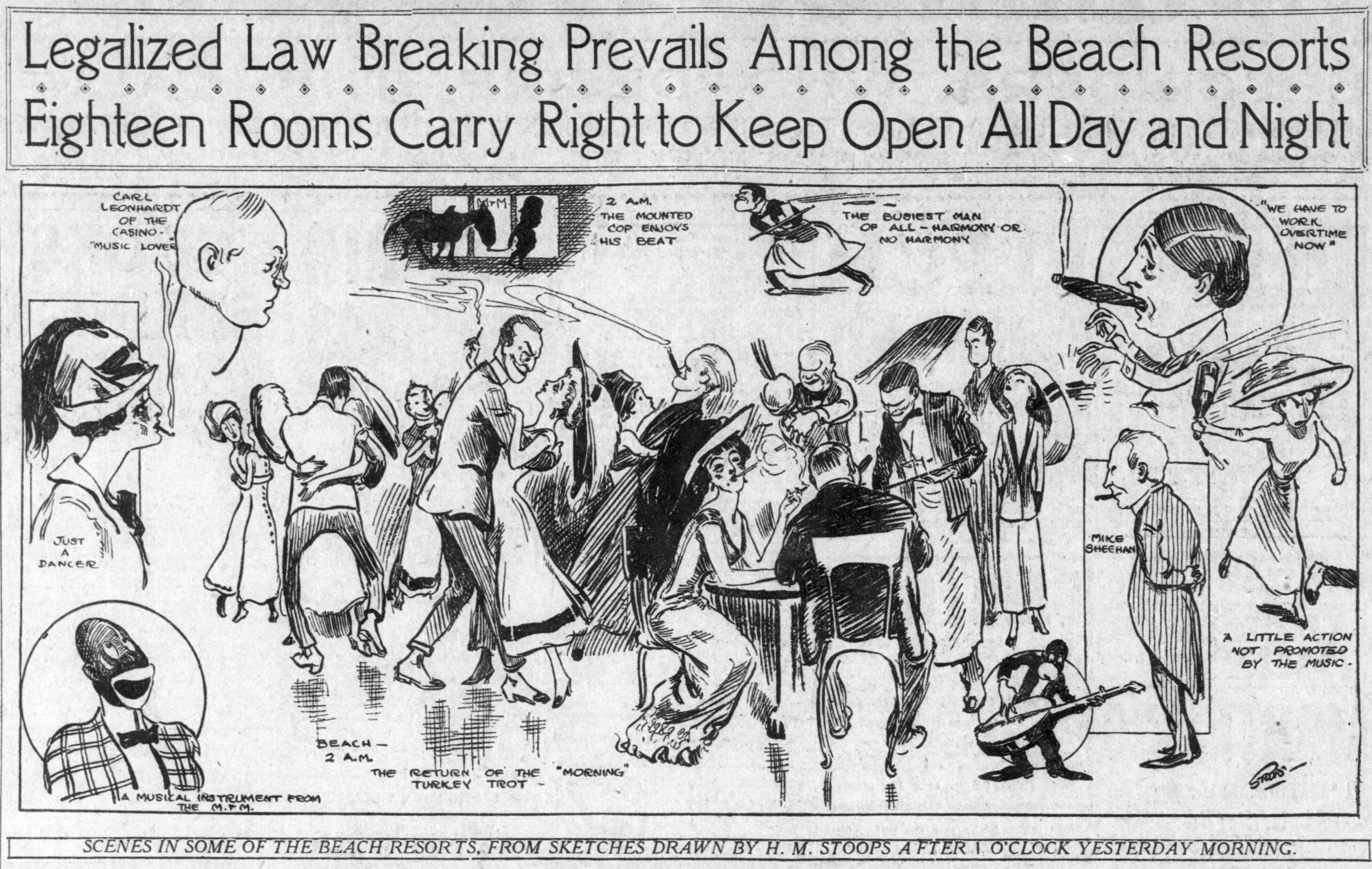
From The San Francisco Call in 1911

Stoops was born in Logan, Utah, in 1888. His father was a Mormon preacher. He grew up on a ranch in Idaho before returning to Utah to attend Utah State College, where he first studied art formally. He graduated in 1905 and attained employment as an artist for the San Francisco Chronicle by 1910. He also later worked for the San Francisco Examiner. Stoops moved to Chicago in 1914 and worked as a staff artist for the Chicago Tribune while studying at the School of the Art Institute of Chicago.

In 1917, Stoops joined the Army and served as a first lieutenant in the Sixth Field Artillery in the First Division. While in France, he sketched soldiers and battle scenes, which he sent back to America; a compilation of these drawings were published in 1924 under the title Inked Memories of 1918. After the conclusion of World War I, Stoops moved to New York City and married a woman named Elise Borough. At some point, the artist Harvey Dunn began tutoring Stoops, whose work improved.

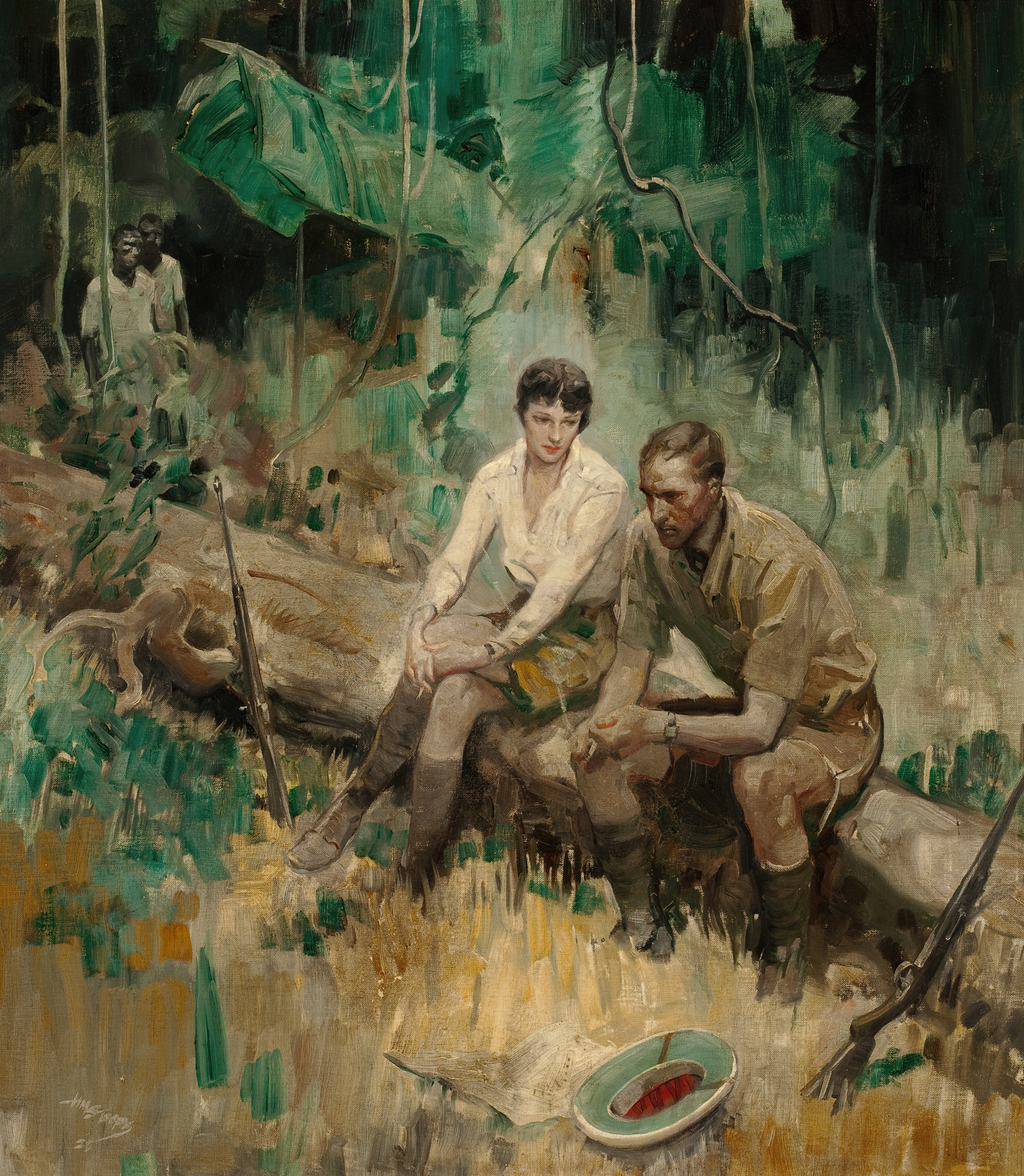
Break from the Hunt, 1925

As the quality of Stoops' work increased, he became a highly desired artist; magazines such as the Blue Book, Collier's, and The American Legion frequently featured his work on their covers and in their articles. He was especially associated with Blue Book, frequently providing cover illustrations for the magazine from 1935 until his death. In addition to magazines, he also provided illustrations for books; for example, his artwork was used in many of Frank Bird Linderman's works. Stoops occasionally signed his work with one of two pseudonyms, Jeremy Cannon and Raymond Sisley. Outside of his illustration work, he also produced and exhibited oil paintings.

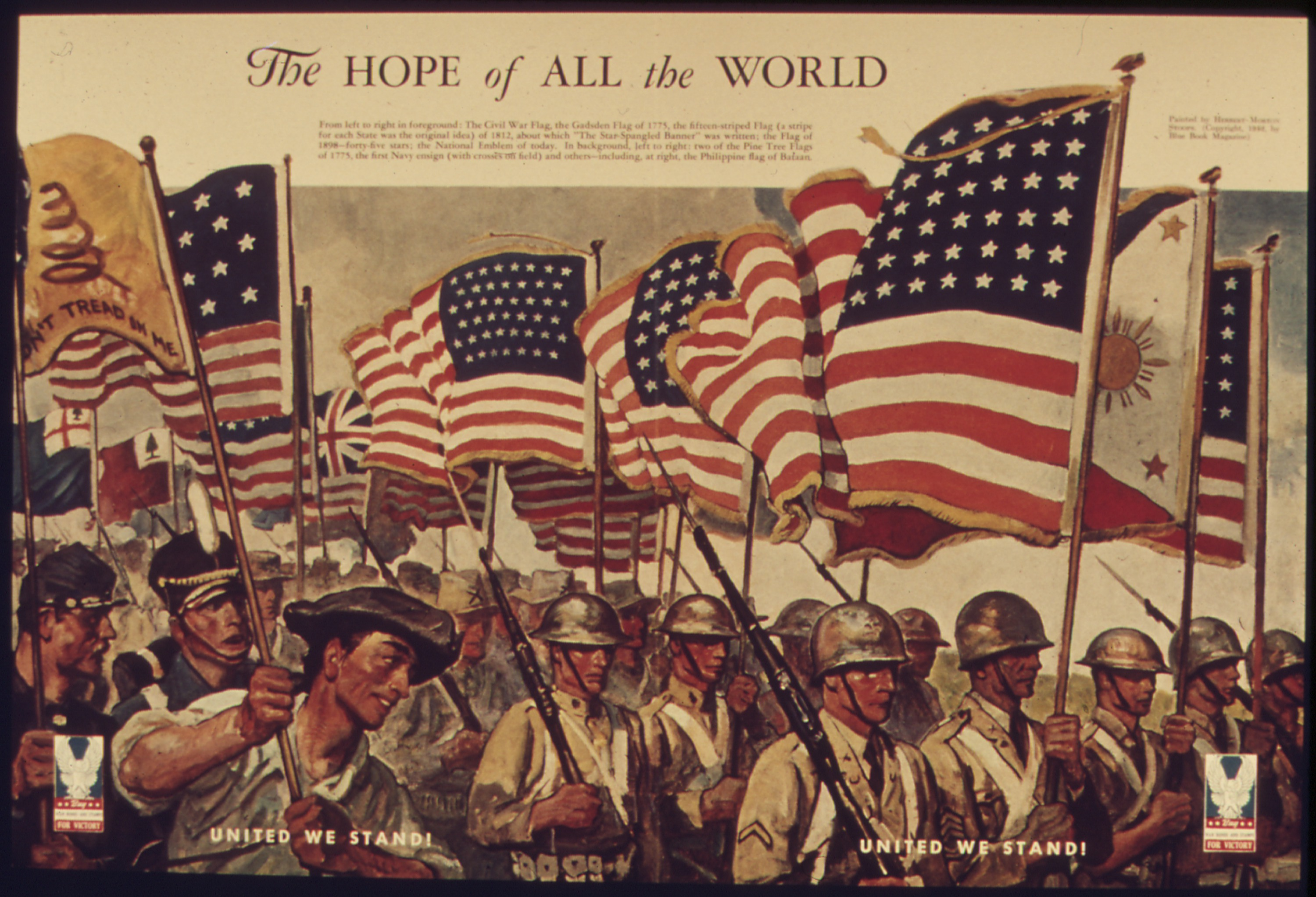
Poster from 1942

Stoops received the Isidor Medal from the National Academy of Design in 1940 for Anno Domini, a work depicting war's effect on refugees. He was the president of the Artist's Guild in New York, a member of the Salmagundi Club and the Society of Illustrators, and an honorary member of the New York Association of Veterans of the French Foreign Legion. Before Stoops' death, he began working on a series of covers for Blue Book depicting the history of each US state; he completed 17 before he succumbed to a prolonged illness on May 19, 1948, at the age of 60. He died in his art studio in Greenwich Village. Stoops was a 2009 inductee into the Society of Illustrators' Hall of Fame.

=== Work ===
Stoops was capable of utilizing a wide array of mediums, including oil, tempera, charcoal, and watercolor. His work was used in a variety of types of media, such as magazines, pulps, and books; he also exhibited standalone paintings from time to time. The most common themes of his work were Western and military subjects.
