= Ken Steacy =

Canadian comics artist and writer (born 1955)

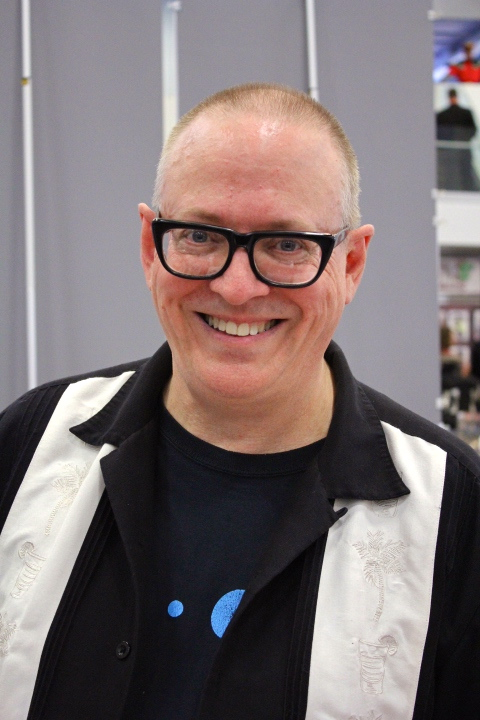
- Steacy at the 2013 Wizard World New York Experience in Manhattan
- Born: January 8, 1955 (age 71)
- Areas: Writer, Artist, Publisher
- Notable works: Astro Boy; Jonny Quest; Jello Man and Wobbly

Ken Steacy (born January 8, 1955) is a Canadian comics artist and writer best known for his work on the NOW Comics comic book series of Astro Boy and of the Comico comic series of Jonny Quest, as well as his graphic novel collaborations with Harlan Ellison (Night and the Enemy, 1987) and Dean Motter (The Sacred and the Profane, 1987). Steacy was a member of the Royal Canadian Air Cadets 386 Comox Squadron.

== Career ==
Ken Steacy had work published in several issues of the Star Reach comics anthology series from 1977 to 1979. He collaborated with writer Dean Motter on "The Sacred and the Profane" in Star Reach and the feature was later redrawn and expanded in Epic Illustrated #20–26 (Oct. 1983–Oct. 1984). The entire story was collected into a trade paperback by Eclipse Comics in 1987. Steacy's adaptations of Harlan Ellison's short stories "Sleeping Dogs" in Epic Illustrated #4 (Winter 1980), "Life Hutch" in #6 (June 1981), and "Run for the Stars" in #11 (April 1982) were later collected in the Night and the Enemy graphic novel published by Comico. Steacy drew four issues of Marvel Fanfare – three featuring Iron Man and one starring Alpha Flight. At DC Comics, Steacy was one of the artists on Batman #400 (Oct. 1986) and he wrote and drew the Tempus Fugitive limited series in 1990. Steacy has operated his own publishing company called Ken Steacy Publishing since 2004.

In late 2011, Steacy and his wife, graphic novelist Joan Steacy, started teaching a visual storytelling course at Camosun College in Victoria, British Columbia. The Steacys have since developed a comics and graphic novels certificate program to be offered through Camosun College. In 2018, Steacy and writer Margaret Atwood's graphic novel War Bears was published by Dark Horse.

== Charitable work ==
Steacy made several appearances in the Desert Bus for Hope charity webcasts (specifically in 2009–2012, 2014–2019, and 2023–2026), run by the sketch comedy group LoadingReadyRun (of which his son Alex is a member). For a donation of $500 he drew a picture of Amaterasu, the main character of Ōkami. For $1100, he drew a picture of Link and Epona from the Legend of Zelda franchise. He also donated a large amount of items for auction. For his contributions he was given the nickname "Value Added". During the 2014 Desert Bus for Hope, Steacy made an appearance wearing an Astro Boy costume auctioning off pieces from his collection.

== Awards ==
In 2009, Steacy was inducted into the Canadian Comic Book Creator Hall of Fame. He won the Eisner Award for Best Art Team (with Steve Rude and Willie Blyberg) in 1988.

== Bibliography ==
=== Andromeda Publications ===
- Andromeda #2 (three pages) (1978)

=== Blackthorne Publishing ===
- Alien Worlds vol. 2 #1 (1986)

=== Comico ===
- Jonny Quest #8 (1987)
- Night and the Enemy GN (1987)
- Robotech the Graphic Novel (1986)
- Space Ghost #1 (colourist) (1987)

=== DC Comics ===
- Batman #400 (1986)
- Blackhawk #272 (1984)
- Doom Force Special #1 (1992)
- Doom Patrol vol. 2 #53 (1992)
- Harlan Ellison's 7 Against Chaos HC (colourist) (2013)
- Secret Origins #35 (1988)
- Tempus Fugitive #1–4 (1990–1991)
- Who's Who in the DC Universe #15 (1992)
- Who's Who in the Legion of Super-Heroes #6 (1988)
- Who's Who: The Definitive Directory of the DC Universe #11, 19 (1986)

=== Eclipse Comics ===
- Alien Worlds #8 (1984)
- The Sacred and the Profane GN (1987)

=== Marvel Comics ===
- Amazing High Adventure #5 (1986)
- Epic Illustrated #4, 6, 11, 20–26 (1980–1984)
- Marvel Comics Presents #78 (1991)
- Marvel Fanfare #22–23, 28, 44 (1985–1989)
- Savage Tales vol. 2 #5 (1986)
- Star Wars #105–106 (1986)
- Strip #11 (1990)

=== Now Comics ===
- The Original Astro Boy #1-16

=== Orb Publications ===
- Orb Magazine #3–4 (1974–1975)

=== Pacific Comics ===
- Alien Worlds #2–5 (1983)
- Silverheels #1–3 (1983–1984)
- Twisted Tales #2 (1983)

=== Star Reach ===
- Star Reach #8–14, 16 (1977–1979)

=== Vortex Comics ===
- Vortex #3–5 (1983)

=== Welsh Publishing Group ===
- The Adventures of Jell-O Man and Wobbly #1 (1991)
