= Twisted Tales =

Horror comic anthology

- The cover of Twisted Tales #2, illustrated by Bernie Wrightson

Publication information
- Publisher: Pacific Comics 1982-1984; Eclipse Comics 1984-1987
- Schedule: Bimonthly
- Format: Anthology
- Publication date: November 1982 – December 1984; November 1987
- No. of issues: 11

Creative team
- Created by: Bruce Jones
- Written by: Bruce Jones

Twisted Tales was a horror comics anthology published by Pacific Comics and, later, Eclipse Comics, in the early 1980s. The title was edited by Bruce Jones and April Campbell.

== Publication history ==
Twisted Tales was published on a bi-monthly schedule by Pacific Comics from November 1982 to May 1984, running for eight issues. After Pacific went bankrupt, the titles were taken over by Eclipse. After publishing two further editions, Eclipse announced they wouldn't be continuing Twisted Tales or Jones and Campbell's fellow anthology Alien Worlds, instead replacing them with their own titles, with the sexual content reduced. The replacement for Twisted Tales was Tales of Terror; while Jones occasionally contributed to the new anthology it featured numerous other writers. In August 1986, Blackthorne Publishing released Twisted Tales 3-D #1 (#7 in their 3-D series), with reprints of stories taken from earlier issues; meanwhile Eclipse would publish The Twisted Tales of Bruce Jones, reprinting various material.

The title was resurrected as a bi-annual prestige format ongoing by Jones under his Bruce Jones Associates packaging company, to be published once again through Eclipse. The deal also covered a similar format for Alien Worlds, Jones' superhero series Man of War and supernatural detective series Hand of Fate. However, only a single issue of the new Twisted Tales - featuring a cover by Dave Stevens - would appear, in November 1987.

Following Eclipse's bankruptcy in 1995, the company's assets were purchased by Todd McFarlane. Believing that the deal included the names of the Jones/Campbell anthologies, he teased a series called Todd McFarlane's Twisted Tales in the 1998 one-shot Total Eclipse; however, the comic would never appear. In January 2005, McFarlane announced that he was set to produce a half-hour anthology television series for Fox called Twisted Tales, based on the comic book.

== Content ==
With three exceptions (William F. Nolan's "The Party" in Issue # 8, Dennis Etchison's "Wet Season" in Issue #9, and David Carren's "If She Dies" in issue #10, which was later adapted into an episode of the 1980s revival of The Twilight Zone), all of the stories in the entire run of Twisted Tales were written by Jones, who had already worked as scripter for Warren Publishings Creepy and Eerie titles. As noted in his editorial in Issue #1, his chief inspiration was the bloody and ironically moralistic tales of the EC horror comics. His work in Twisted Tales, often utilizing twist endings, added huge dollops of graphic violence and sexuality to the EC formula, complete with copious female nudity. Several issues sported a "Recommended For Mature Readers" warning on the cover.

Front covers for the comic were by - among others - Richard Corben, John Bolton, and Bernie Wrightson. Interior artists included Corben, Bolton, Wrightson, Mike Ploog, Val Mayerik, Bill Wray, Tim Conrad, Alfredo Alcala, and Rick Geary, as well as one story written and illustrated by Jones himself.

== Features ==
=== 1982 series ===
Issue	Date	Contents
1	November 1982	"Infected" (art by Richard Corben): A sleazy credit collector seduces beautiful woman who warns him beforehand that she has "crabs".; "Out of His Depth" (art by Alfredo Alcala): A rich but stupid man returns from the grave to kill the wife who murdered him.; "A Walk in the Woods" (art by Bret Blevins): A couple vacationing in Germany find themselves trapped in an increasingly horrific fairy tale.; "All Hallows" (art by Tim Conrad): A group of boys help the mouldering corpse of a friend who was murdered seek vengeance on his killers every Halloween.
2	April 1983	"Over His Head" (art by Mike Ploog): A loser's daydreams about a love affair with a beautiful woman result in her "murder" and his death by drowning.; "Night Watch" (art by Ken Steacy): Warfare between members of a platoon and giant rat turns out to be a child playing with toy soldiers.; "Infant Terrible" (art by Val Mayerik): The aborted foetus of a young woman dumped into polluted river mutates into a monster that drives her insane.; "Speed Demons" (art by Rand Holmes): A ghostly couple force taxi driver to drive recklessly fast.
3	June 1983	"Me an' ol' Rex" (art by Richard Corben): A boy's dinosaur imaginary friend is really his cannibal father chained up in a wood shed.; "Off Key" (art by Doug Wildey): A young couple find their lives inadvertently controlled by a friend's constantly changing screenplay draft.; "With Honor" (art by Bill Wray): A Japanese soldier convinces his friend to remain behind on an island for years following World War II so he can steal the man's wife.; "Sunken Chest" (art by Bret Blevins): An abusive fisherman left in the ocean to die by his wife's lover is consumed by a large shark.
4	August 1983	"The Well" (art by John Bolton): A young woman follows her husband into a well and is impregnated by a hideous monster.; "Nick of Time" (art by Don Lomax): Two lesbians concoct an elaborate plan to rid themselves of their husbands.; "The Secret Place" (art by Bruce Jones): A lonely boy develops a friendship with a creature hidden in a lake.
5	October 1983	"Terminated" (art by Richard Corben): Villagers murder a horribly diseased man, whose bloody remains fall into the town's water supply.; "Scritch...Scritch...Scritch" (art by Bill Wray): A man devises an ingenious plan to force his friend to commit suicide, so he can seduce the dead man's wife.; "Majority of One" (art by Val Mayerik): In a world populated by werewolves, "normal" men and women are routinely hunted down and killed.; "Banjo Lessons" (art by Rand Holmes): A man on trial for the gruesome murders of his three best friends reveals the circumstances leading to their deaths.
6	January 1984	"You, Illusion" (art by John Bolton): An old man can control other people's lives in his dreams.; "Evening Walk" (art by John Totleben): A man walking in the city at night turns into a dog, while the man's dog transforms into a woman.; "Home Ties" (art by Mike Hoffman): In a haunted house, a man sees a murder and suicide re-enacted by ghosts.; "Roomers" (art by Attilio Micheluzzi): A decrepit old man sits in his apartment and waits to die.
7	March 1984	"Holly's Hobby" (art by John Bolton): An eccentric old woman murders visitors and keeps their severed heads to talk to.; "Hooked!" (art by Bill Wray): A gigolo encounters his latest target's murderous mutant son.; "Sasquatch" (art by Ian Aiken & Brian Garvey): Cannibalism, murderous vengeance and the Abominable Snowman.; "Shut-In" (art by Tanino Liberatore): A mute old man incapable of movement fantasises about murdering his sexy teenaged babysitter and her boyfriend.
8	May 1984	"Way Down There in the Dark" (art by Thom Enriquez): An abused young boy has a telepathic connection with a mutant-thing in the sewer.; "First Impressions" (art by Butch Guice): After desecrating his obnoxious professor's grave, a young college student steals the dead man's watch - only to have the corpse bite his leg, leaving teeth permanently imbedded in the flesh.; "An Unsettling Incident" (art by Rick Geary): In 1735 a young man murders his wife and her sister with an axe.; "The Party" (art by Mike Hoffman): A man finds himself trapped for eternity in a hellish party.
9	November 1984	Warped Panels" (art by Thom Enriquez): A writer and his artist friend find themselves trapped in a comic book story.; "Deadlights" (art by Bill Wray): Ghostly 1950s teenagers haunt a highway.; "Spade, the Werewolf, and Me" (art by Val Mayerik): After being bitten by a monstrous wolf, a boy's beloved pet dog becomes a werewolf.; "Wet Season" (art by Mike Hoffman): Numerous human-shaped female-things from a watery world marry eligible men in a small town and transform the area into a rain-soaked place of horror.
10	December 1984	"Egg in Your Beer" (art by Berni Wrightson): A newcomer in a snowy Canadian village stops off at a bar for a beer and is told an outlandish story about the Sasquatch.; "One for the Money…" (art by Bill Wray): A thief robs a house during a costume party, and murders a guest in a bear suit who has caught him in the act. Stealing the dead man's costume, he escapes into the woods and is killed by hunters.; "Hatchet Job" (art by Gray Morrow): A time traveler thinks he will act as a witness to the Lizzie Borden murders, but ends up committing the crimes himself.; "…Two for the Show!" (art by Bill Wray): At a costume party, a man in a bear suit accidentally kills a burglar during a struggle. He pockets the stolen loot himself, then escapes into the woods and is killed by a grizzly bear.; "If She Dies" (art by Attilio Micheluzzi): A father struggling with the imminent death of his daughter is visited by the ghost of a young girl.; "Poison in the Pantry" (art by Rick Geary): A woman kills new husband and his family with 'Rat-Pruf' poison.

=== 1987 series ===
Issue	Date	Contents
-	November 1987	"Termites from Mars" (art by Rick Stasi): 1950s small town boys who love science fiction movies experience an unforgettable evening in a haunted house.; "Fraternity" (art by Scott Saavedra): A lonely fat man picks up women in bars by telling them sob stories about his non-existent dead brother.; "Night Dive" (art by Henry Mayo): An ambitious young man joins an exclusive yacht club and finds it is his one-way ticket to Davy Jones' Locker.
