= Joe Chiodo =

American artist and colorist

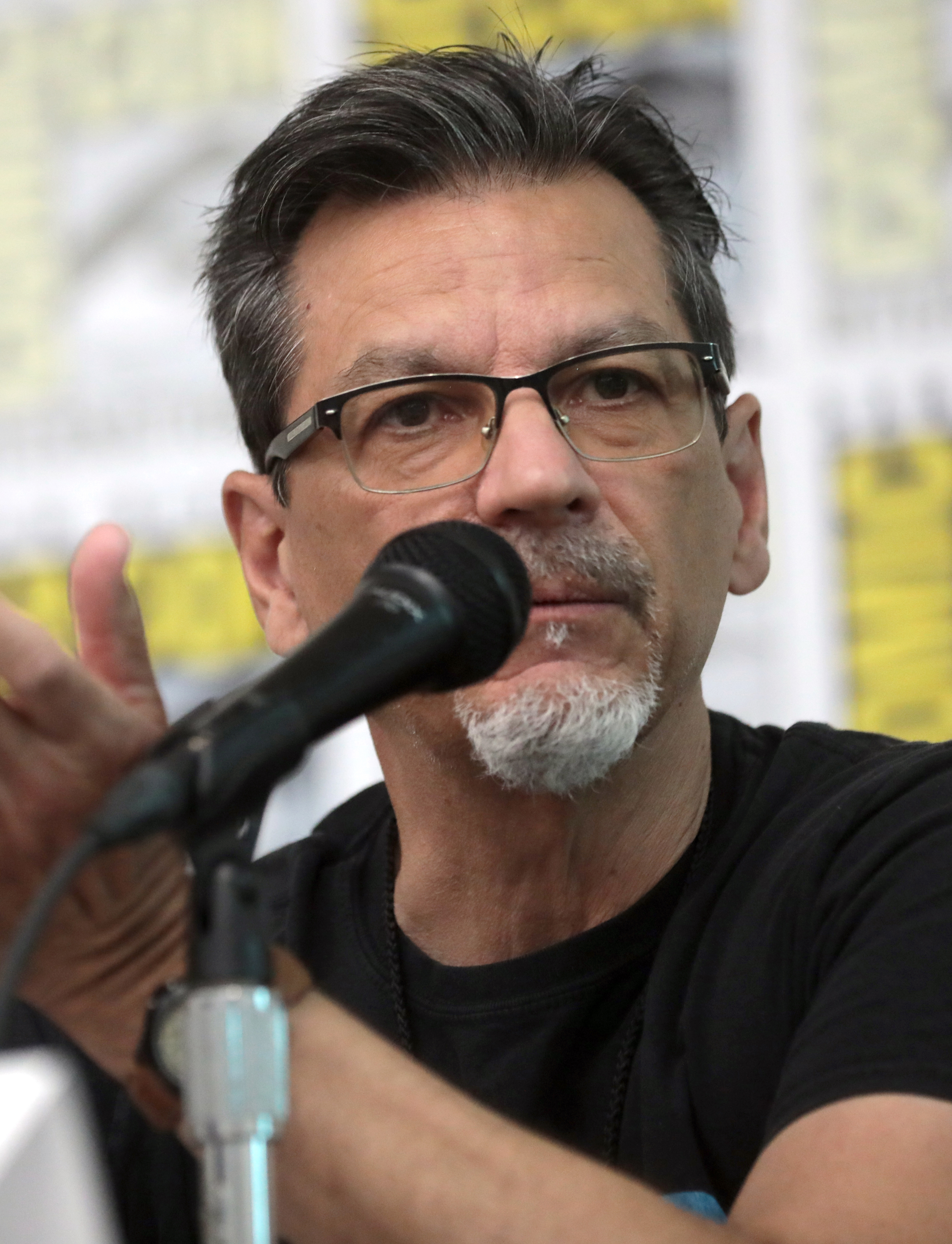
- Chiodo at the 2021 San Diego Comic-Con
- Born: January 22, 1958 (age 68)
- Area: Colourist

Joe Chiodo (born 22 January 1958) is an American artist and colorist who has worked in the comics industry. He has been recognized for his work with a nomination for the Comics Buyer's Guide Favorite Colorist Award in 1997 (with the company Wildstorm FX and colleague Jessica Ruffner), and in 1998 under his own name.

== Biography ==
Chiodo is the youngest of four boys and raised in San Jose, California. He graduated from Andrew Hill High School in 1975.

He traveled to various places such as New York and Los Angeles, where he worked for a diverse client base, doing book covers, and other work for toy companies, games, and comics, eventually settling in San Diego.

Chiodo has been recognized as an award-winning pin-up artist and illustrator. He combines cartoony techniques with those of classic pin-up artists, often working on a range of body types and pulp themes. He illustrated the children's alphabet board book The Adventures of WonderBaby, and wrote a book, How To Draw And Paint Pin-Ups.

He has also had his works compiled in Works of Art: Joe Chiodo and Sketches, Drawings, and Paintings by Joe Chiodo, both of which were published by American publisher Hermes Press.

Chiodo currently works out of his home which he shares with his wife and two children.
