= Marvel Fanfare =

Comics anthology series

- Cover for Marvel Fanfare #1 (March 1982). Art by Michael Golden

Publication information
- Publisher: Marvel Comics
- Schedule: (Vol. 1) bimonthly (Vol. 2) monthly
- Format: Series
- Publication date: (Vol. 1); March 1982–December 1991 (Vol. 2); September 1996–February 1997
- No. of issues: (Vol. 1): 60 (Vol. 2): 6
- Editor: List: (Vol. 1) Al Milgrom (Vol. 2) James Felder

Marvel Fanfare is an anthology comic book series published by American company Marvel Comics. It was a showcase title featuring a variety of characters from the Marvel universe.

== Volume one ==
Marvel Fanfare featured characters and settings from throughout the Marvel Universe, and it included stories of varying lengths by an array of creators. The title was published every two months and ran for 60 issues, cover dated from March 1982 to December 1991. It was edited throughout its run by Al Milgrom, who also wrote and drew an illustrated column, entitled "Editori-Al", in most issues. Marvel Fanfare's original working title was Marvel Universe, which was later appropriated by Marvel editor-in-chief Jim Shooter for the encyclopedia series The Official Handbook of the Marvel Universe.

The series began with a Spider-Man/Angel team-up story by Chris Claremont and Michael Golden. Other Spider-Man appearances in the title included team-ups with the Scarlet Witch in issue #6 (Jan. 1983) and the Hulk in issue #47 (Nov. 1989). Several characters appeared in multiple issues including Doctor Strange, Weirdworld, the Warriors Three, the Black Knight, and Shanna the She-Devil. Writer Roger McKenzie wrote several stories for Marvel Fanfare including a two-part Iron Man vs. Doctor Octopus tale drawn by Ken Steacy. A Captain America backup story in issue #29 (Nov. 1986) featured early work by artist Norm Breyfogle.

Marvel Fanfare was envisioned as a showcase of the comics industry's best talent. Each issue featured 36 pages of material with no advertisements and it was printed on magazine-style slick paper. It was more than twice as expensive as standard comic books ($1.25 in 1982 when most titles were 60 cents and $2.25 in 1991 when most were $1).

Editor Milgrom wrote of his experience with the series:

It was intended that [Marvel Fanfare] would appeal especially to the fans. [I] tried to get the best possible stuff ( . . . by either established pros or talented newcomers). At least part of the purpose was to use better paper, more elaborate, detailed coloring and, by charging a higher cover price, to eliminate all those unsightly ads. The creators were paid a bonus 50% rate, too. I was sometimes 'accused' of just using up inventory material — as if that was necessarily a bad thing. I did use some inventory stuff — if I thought it was of high enough quality. As with any grand vision, the results sometimes fell short of the goal. . . . What finally killed it was the advent of incentive payments to freelancers — top creators could make far more than the rate-and-a-half Fanfare paid if they worked on many of the better-selling regular titles. That and my workload and family obligations made it tough to keep the book going. And sales had begun to drop as well.

Examples of inventory stories which saw publication in Marvel Fanfare include a comics adaptation of The Jungle Book in issues #8–11, the Black Widow serial in #10–13, the Hulk story in #29, and the Silver Surfer story by Steve Englehart and John Buscema in #51.

=== Stories in Volume 1 ===
Issue #	A Story	B Story	C Story/Pinups
1	X-Men and Spider-Man "In the Savage Land"; Chris Claremont, Michael Golden, Dave Cockrum, Paul Smith; Collected in X-Men: In the Savage Land; Marvel Fanfare: Strange Tales; X-Men Epic: I, Magneto; and Uncanny X-Men Omnibus Vol 2	Daredevil "Snow"; Roger McKenzie, Paul Smith; Collected in Marvel Fanfare: Strange Tales, Daredevil Epic Collection Vol 9: Resurrection, and Marvel Masterworks: Daredevil Vol 16	No C Story
2	X-Men and Spider-Man "In the Savage Land"; Chris Claremont, Michael Golden, Dave Cockrum, Paul Smith; Collected in X-Men: In the Savage Land; Marvel Fanfare: Strange Tales; X-Men Epic: I, Magneto; and Uncanny X-Men Omnibus Vol 2	Fantastic Four "Annihilation"; Roger McKenzie, Trevor VonEeden Collected in Marvel Fanfare: Strange Tales and Marvel Masterworks: Fantastic Four Vol 22	No C Story
3	X-Men and Spider-Man "In the Savage Land"; Chris Claremont, Michael Golden, Dave Cockrum, Paul Smith; Collected in X-Men: In the Savage Land; Marvel Fanfare: Strange Tales; X-Men Epic: I, Magneto; and Uncanny X-Men Omnibus Vol 2	Hawkeye "Swashbucklers"; Charlie Boatner, Trevor VonEeden Collected in Marvel Fanfare: Strange Tales, Marvel Masterworks: The Avengers Vol 21, and Hawkeye Epic Collection: The Avenging Archer	No C Story
4	X-Men and Spider-Man "In the Savage Land"; Chris Claremont, Michael Golden, Dave Cockrum, Paul Smith; Collected in X-Men: In the Savage Land; Marvel Fanfare: Strange Tales; X-Men Epic: I, Magneto; and Uncanny X-Men Omnibus Vol 2	Deathlok "Mindgame"; David Kraft, Michael Golden; Collected in Marvel Fanfare: Strange Tales and Marvel Masterworks: Deathlok Vol 1	Iron Man "Ordeal!"; David Michelinie, David Winn, Michael Golden; Collected in Marvel Fanfare: Strange Tales and Marvel Masterworks: Iron Man Vol 16
5	Dr. Strange "To Steal the Sorcerer's Soul"; Chris Claremont, Marshall Rogers; Collected in Marvel Fanfare: Strange Tales, Doctor Strange: What Is It That Disturbs You, Stephen? and Marvel Masterworks: Doctor Strange Vol 8	Captain America "Shall Freedom Endure"; Roger McKenzie, Luke McDonnell; Collected in Marvel Fanfare: Strange Tales and Marvel Masterworks: Captain America Vol 16	No C Story
6	Spider-Man and Scarlet Witch "Switch Witch"; Mike W. Barr, Sandy Plunkett; Collected in Marvel Fanfare: Strange Tales, and Marvel Masterworks: Vision and the Scarlet Witch Vol 1	Dr. Strange "The Showdown"; Roger Stern, Charlie Vess; Collected in Marvel Fanfare: Strange Tales, Doctor Strange: What Is It That Disturbs You, Stephen? and Marvel Masterworks: Doctor Strange Vol 9	No C Story
7	Hulk, Blob and Unus "With Friends Like These"; Steven Grant, Joe Barney; Collected in Marvel Fanfare: Strange Tales and Marvel Masterworks: The Incredible Hulk Vol 18	Daredevil "Bless the Beasts and Children"; Bill Mantlo, George Freeman; Collected in Marvel Fanfare: Strange Tales and Marvel Masterworks: Daredevil Vol 18	No C Story
8	Dr. Strange "The Light That Never Was"; Al Milgrom Collected in Marvel Masterworks: Dr. Strange Vol 11	The Jungle Book (Adaptation) Gil Kane, Mary Jo Duffy, P. Craig Russell; Collected in The Jungle Book	"The Bill Sienkiewicz Portfolio" Features Thor and Hulk
9	Man-Thing "Rock and Soul"; J.M. DeMatteis, Joe Brozowski	The Jungle Book (Adaptation) Gil Kane, Mary Jo Duffy, P. Craig Russell; Collected in The Jungle Book	"The Butch Guice Portfolio" Features Wolverine, Kitty Pryde, Power Man & Iron Fist, Gorgon, Howard the Duck
10	Black Widow "Widow"; Ralph Macchio, George Perez; Collected in Black Widow: Web of Intrigue, Black Widow Epic: The Coldest War, Black Widow Strikes Omnibus, and Marvel Masterworks: Daredevil Vol 18	The Jungle Book (Adaptation) Gil Kane, Mary Jo Duffy, P. Craig Russell; Collected in The Jungle Book	No C Story
11	Black Widow "Widow"; Ralph Macchio, George Perez; Collected in Black Widow: Web of Intrigue, Black Widow Epic: The Coldest War, Black Widow Strikes Omnibus, and Marvel Masterworks: Daredevil Vol 18	The Jungle Book (Adaptation) Gil Kane, Mary Jo Duffy, P. Craig Russell; Collected in The Jungle Book	No C Story
12	Black Widow "Widow"; Ralph Macchio, George Perez; Collected in Black Widow: Web of Intrigue, Black Widow Epic: The Coldest War, Black Widow Strikes Omnibus, and Marvel Masterworks: Daredevil Vol 18	No B story	No C Story
13	Black Widow "Widow"; Ralph Macchio, George Perez; Collected in Black Widow: Web of Intrigue, Black Widow Epic: The Coldest War, Black Widow Strikes Omnibus, and Marvel Masterworks: Daredevil Vol 18	Warriors Three "Ballad of the Warriors Three"; Alan Zelenetz, Charles Vess; Collected in Thor: The Warriors Three	No C Story
14	Vision and Fantastic Four "Dangerous Vision"; Roger McKenzie, Rick Leonardi Collected in Marvel Masterworks: The Fantastic Four Vol 24 and Marvel Masterworks: Vision and the Scarlet Witch Vol 1	Quicksilver and the Inhumans "Against Attilan"; Mary Jo Duffy, Alan Weiss Collected in Marvel Masterworks: Inhumans Vol. 2	No C Story
15	The Thing "that night..." Barry Windsor-Smith; Collected in The Best of the Fantastic Four, Vol 1 and The Thing Omnibus Vol 1	Daredevil "Crimson Ash"; Roger McKenzie, Jack Sparling	No C Story
16	Sky-Wolves "Sky-Wolf!"; Marv Wolfman, Dave Cockrum	Sub-Mariner "A Fable"; Bill Mantlo, Mike Mignola; Collected in Doctor Strange & Doctor Doom: Triumph & Torment	No C Story
17	Sky-Wolves "Sky-Wolf!"; Marv Wolfman, Dave Cockrum	Hulk "A Day in the Life"; David Kraft, Tony Salmons, Al Milgrom	No C Story
18	Captain America "Home Fires"; Roger Stern, Roger McKenzie, Frank Miller; Collected in Captain America Epic: Society of Serpents and Marvel Universe by Frank Miller Omnibus	"Kevin Nowlan Portfolio" Featuring Nova, Black Widow, Phoenix, Red Sonja, Dagger, She-Hulk	"The Terry Austin Portfolio" Featuring Dr. Doom
19	Cloak & Dagger "Such Sweet Sorrow"; Bill Mantlo, Tony Salmons; Collected in Cloak & Dagger: Crime and Punishment, Cloak & Dagger Omnibus Vol 1, and Cloak & Dagger: Shadows and Light	Cloak & Dagger "Dancin' the Night Away"; Bill Mantlo, Rick Leonardi; Collected in Cloak & Dagger: Crime and Punishment, and Cloak & Dagger Omnibus Vol 1	Cloak & Dagger "Dagger's Light"; Bill Mantlo, Kerry Gammill; Collected in Cloak & Dagger: Crime and Punishment, and Cloak & Dagger Omnibus Vol 1
20	Thing and Dr. Strange "The Clash"; Jim Starlin	No B Story	No C Story
21	Thing and Dr. Strange "The Clash"; Jim Starlin	No B Story	No C Story
22	Iron Man "Night of the Octopus"; Roger McKenzie, Ken Steacy; Collected in Iron Man Epic: Return of the Ghost	No B Story	Pinups Featuring Fantastic Four, Spider-Man, Thor, Hulk, Captain America, Conan
23	Iron Man "Night of the Octopus"; Roger McKenzie, Ken Steacy; Collected in Iron Man Epic: Return of the Ghost	No B Story	No C Story
24	Weirdworld "Weirdworld"; Doug Moensch, Mike Ploog; Collected in Weirdworld	Ms. Marvel/Binary "Elegy"; Chris Claremont, David Ross, Bob Wiacek; Collected in Ms. Marvel Epic Collection: The Woman Who Fell to Earth; Marvel Masterworks: Ms. Marvel Vol 2; and Captain Marvel: Ms. Marvel – A Hero Is Born Omnibus	No C Story
25	Weirdworld "Weirdworld"; Doug Moensch, Mike Ploog; Collected in Weirdworld	Captain Universe "School's Out"; Bill Mantlo, June Brigman; Collected in Captain Universe: Power Unimaginable	No C Story
26	Weirdworld "Weirdworld"; Doug Moensch, Mike Ploog; Collected in Weirdworld	Captain America "Death and the Queen"; Will Jungkuntz Collected in Captain America by Mark Gruenwald Omnibus Vol 1	No C Story
27	Daredevil "Cars"; Bill Mantlo, Tony Salmons	Spider-Man "Spidey Gets Antsy"; Marc Hempel Collected in Marvel Masterworks: Amazing Spider-Man Vol 26	No C Story
28	Alpha Flight "Murder by Number, 1, 2, 3..."; Bill Mantlo, Ken Steacy Collected in Alpha Flight by Bill Mantlo and Jim Lee Omnibus	No B Story	No C Story
29	Hulk "A Terrible Thing to Waste"; John Byrne; Collected in The Incredible Hulk Visionaries — John Byrne; Marvel Universe by John Byrne Omnibus Vol 1; and Hulk Epic: Going Gray	Captain America "Story"; Norm Breyfogle; Collected in Captain America Epic: Justice Is Served; Captain America by Mark Gruenwald Omnibus Vol 1	No C Story
30	Moon Knight "Real-to-Reel"; Ann Nocenti, Bent Eric Anderson; Collected in Essential Moon Knight vol. 3, Moon Knight Omnibus Vol 2, and Moon Knight Epic: Butcher's Moon	No B Story	No C Story
31	Captain America "A Plague of Frogs"; J.M. DeMatteis, Kerry Gammill Collected in Captain America Epic: Justice Is Served, Captain America by Mark Gruenwald Omnibus Vol 1	Dr. Strange "Dr. Owl"; Mark Wheatley Collected in Marvel Masterworks: Dr. Strange Vol 11	Daredevil "The Call"; Norm Breyfogle
32	Captain America "A Plague of Frogs"; J.M. DeMatteis, Kerry Gammill Collected in Captain America Epic: Justice Is Served, Captain America by Mark Gruenwald Omnibus Vol 1	Vision and Scarlet Witch "Rosie"; Roger McKenzie, Paul Smith Collected in Marvel Masterworks: Vision and the Scarlet Witch Vol 1	No C Story
33	X-Men "Shadows on the Soul"; Chris Claremont, June Brigman; Collected in The Uncanny X-Men Omnibus Vol 5, X-Men: Mutant Massacre Omnibus, Marvel Masterworks: Uncanny X-Men Vol 13, and X-Men Epic Collection Vol 13: Wounded Wolf	No B Story	No C Story
34	Warriors Three "Warriors Three"; Alan Zelenetz, Charles Vess; Collected in Thor: The Warriors Three	No B Story	Pinups Featuring Warriors Three, Baron Zemo, Red Skull, Kraven, Dormammu, Kang, Loki, Nightmare, Attuma
35	Warriors Three "Warriors Three"; Alan Zelenetz, Charles Vess; Collected in Thor: The Warriors Three	No B Story	Pinups Featuring Phoenix, Scarlet Witch & Vision, Cloak & Dagger, Colossus, Shadowcat, Dr. Strange, Frankenstein, Loki, Man-Thing
36	Warriors Three "Warriors Three"; Alan Zelenetz, Charles Vess; Collected in Thor: The Warriors Three	No B Story	No C Story
37	Warriors Three "Warriors Three"; Alan Zelenetz, Charles Vess; Collected in Thor: The Warriors Three	Fantastic Four "Synchronicity"; Mark Borax, Norm Breyfogle Collected in Marvel Masterworks: The Fantastic Four Vol 27	No C Story
38	Moon Knight "Whatever Happened to the Podunk Slam?"; Jo Duffy, Judith Hunt; Collected in Essential Moon Knight vol. 3, Moon Knight Omnibus Vol 2, and Moon Knight Epic: Butcher's Moon	Rogue and Dazzler (X-Men) "Duet"; Jo Duffy, Colleen Doran; Collected in Marvel Masterworks: Dazzler Vol 4, Dazzler Omnibus, and Uncanny X-Men Omnibus Vol 6	No C Story
39	Hawkeye "The Cat's Tale"; J.M. DeMatteis, Joe Staton Collected in Hawkeye Epic Collection: The Avenging Archer	Moon Knight "#*@%&¢!"; Michael Carlin, Bill Reinhold; Collected in Essential Moon Knight vol. 3, Moon Knight Omnibus Vol 2, and Moon Knight Epic: Butcher's Moon	No C Story
40	Angel (X-Factor) "Chiaroscuro"; Ann Nocenti, Dave Mazzuchelli Collected in X-Factor: The Original X-Men Omnibus Vol 1	Storm and Mystique (X-Men) "Deal with the Devil"; Chris Claremont, Craig Hamilton; Collected in The Uncanny X-Men Omnibus Vol 4, X-Men: Inferno Prologue Omnibus, Marvel Masterworks: Uncanny X-Men Vol 10, and X-Men Epic Collection Vol 11: Lifedeath	Pinups Featuring Dr Strange & Clea by Craig Hamilton, Ka-Zar & Shanna by Craig Hamilton, Sub-Mariner by Kent Williams, Elektra by George Pratt, Storm (back cover) by Craig Hamilton
41	Dr. Strange "...Perchance to Dream"; Walt Simonson, Dave Gibbons	No B Story	No C Story
42	Spider-Man "Windfall"; Carl Potts	Captain Marvel (Photon) "Once More in the City of Light"; Dennis Mallonee, Bob Hall; Collected in Captain Marvel: Monica Rambeau	No C Story
43	Sub-Mariner "Time After Time"; Bill Mantlo, Mike Mignola; Collected in Doctor Strange & Doctor Doom: Triumph & Torment	Fantastic Four "Death in a Vacuum"; Bill Mantlo, Greg Brooks	No C Story
44	Iron Man "Doom Bug"; Ken Steacy; Collected in Iron Man Epic: Return of the Ghost	No B Story	No C Story
45	All-Pinup Issue	No B Story	No C Story
46	Fantastic Four "Inside Job"; Mike W. Barr, Louis Williams	Thing "The Day After"; Danny Fingeroth, Todd Smith	No C Story
47	Spider-Man and Hulk "Renovation"; Bill Mantlo, Michael Golden	No B Story	No C Story
48	She-Hulk "World's Hero, Father's Shame"; Dwight Jon Zimmerman, Kerry Gammill; Collected in She-Hulk Epic Collection: Breaking The Fourth Wall	She-Hulk "California (State) Dreaming"; Sue Flaxman, Don Perlin; Collected in She-Hulk Epic Collection: Breaking The Fourth Wall	Vision "Run Through the Jungle"; Michael Higgins, Ron Wilson Collected in Marvel Masterworks: Vision and the Scarlet Witch Vol 1
49	Dr. Strange, Nick Fury "Strange on the Range"; Alan Weiss	Two-Gun Kid "Two Guns Against the Gang!"; Mike W. Barr, Tod Smith	No C Story
50	X-Factor "If I Had the Wings of an Angel"; Mary Jo Duffy, Joe Staton Collected in X-Factor: The Original X-Men Omnibus Vol. 3	No B-story	No C Story
51	Silver Surfer "The Great Terror"; Steve Englehart, John Buscema; Collected in Essential Silver Surfer vol. 2, Silver Surfer Epic: Freedom, Silver Surfer: Return to the Spaceways Omnibus	Nightmare "The Believer"; Dean Schreck, Gene Colan	No C Story
52	Black Knight "The Legend of the Black Knight"; Steven Grant, Scott Hampton	Dr. Strange "Mirror, Mirror"; Dean Schreck, Gene Colan	Pinups by Paul Ryan Featuring Nova, Silver Surfer, Galactus
53	Black Knight "The Legend of the Black Knight"; Steven Grant, Scott Hampton	Iron Man "Never Say 83!"; Dan Mishkin, Dave Ross	No C Story
54	Black Knight "The Legend of the Black Knight"; Steven Grant, Scott Hampton	Wolverine "One Life to Die"; Richard Howell; Collected in Wolverine Omnibus Vol 3	No C Story
55	Power Pack and New Mutants "The Battle of P.S.87!"; Terry Austin, Colleen Doran; Collected in Power Pack Classic Omnibus Volume 2 and New Mutants Omnibus Vol 3	Wolverine "One Life to Die"; Richard Howell; Collected in Wolverine Omnibus Vol 3	No C Story
56	Shanna the She-Devil "Crimes of Pride!"; Steve Gerber, Carmine Infantino, Bret Blevins, Tony DeZuniga Collected in Marvel Masterworks: Ka-Zar Vol 4	A Reader "Toys Night Out!"; Bill Mantlo, Don Heck	No C Story
57	Shanna the She-Devil "Crimes of Pride!"; Steve Gerber, Carmine Infantino, Bret Blevins, Tony DeZuniga Collected in Marvel Masterworks: Ka-Zar Vol 4	Captain Marvel (Photon) "Power and Duty"; Bill Mantlo, George Freeman; Collected in Captain Marvel: Monica Rambeau	No C Story
58	Shanna the She-Devil "Crimes of Pride!"; Steve Gerber, Carmine Infantino, Bret Blevins, Tony DeZuniga Collected in Marvel Masterworks: Ka-Zar Vol 4	Vision and Scarlet Witch "Hometown"; Bill Mantlo, Sandy Plunkett Collected in Marvel Masterworks: Vision and the Scarlet Witch Vol 1	Pinups Featuring Wonder Man, Nick Fury, Punisher
59	Shanna the She-Devil "Crimes of Pride!"; Steve Gerber, Carmine Infantino, Bret Blevins, Tony DeZuniga Collected in Marvel Masterworks: Ka-Zar Vol 4	Hellcat "The Town and Patsy Walker"; Richard Howell; Collected in Women of Marvel: Celebrating Seven Decades	No C Story
60	Black Panther "Big Applesauce"; Walt Simonson, Denys Cowan; Collected in Black Panther Epic Collection Volume 3: Panther's Prey and Black Panther Omnibus: Revenge of the Black Panther	Rogue (X-Men) "The Mission"; Ann Nocenti, Dave Ross; Collected in Classic X-Men Omnibus, and X-Men Classic Complete Collection Vol 2	Daredevil "The Monkey Never Dies"; Paul Smith

== Volume two ==
Marvel Fanfare volume two was published monthly for six issues, dated September 1996 to February 1997. This version of the title was edited by James Felder.

Like the first volume, the title featured different creative teams in each issue and starred different characters from around the Marvel universe. However, the talent were mostly newcomers, the paper was cheap and it cost half the price of most other comics (99 cents when most comics cost $1.95).

The title features the early work of writer Joe Kelly and penciller Scott Kolins.

=== Stories in Volume 2 ===
Issue #	A Story
1	Captain America and Falcon
2	Wolverine and Hulk Collected in Spider-Man by Joe Kelly Omnibus
3	Spider-Man and Ghost Rider Collected in Spider-Man by Joe Kelly Omnibus
4	Longshot and Dazzler Collected in X-Men: Trial of Gambit Omnibus
5	Longshot and Dazzler Collected in X-Men: Trial of Gambit Omnibus
6	Luke Cage, Iron Fist, X-Factor Collected in X-Factor Epic Collection Vol 10: Wreaking Havok

== Collected editions ==
In 2024, Marvel Comics announced it would be collecting the entire series of Marvel Fanfare in three omnibus volumes.

Volume	Years Collected	Material Collected	Pages	Release date	ISBN
1	1982-1984	Marvel Fanfare (1982) #1-19	736	May 13, 2025	978-1302962272
2	1985-1988	Marvel Fanfare (1982) #20-40	784	February 3, 2026	978-1302962654
3	1988-1992	Marvel Fanfare (1982) #41-60	792	August 25, 2026	978-1302968465

=== Other Collected Editions ===
- X-Men: In the Savage Land collects Marvel Fanfare #1–4, 96 pages, June 1988, ISBN 978-0871353382
- Marvel Fanfare: Strange Tales collects Marvel Fanfare #1–7, 244 pages, April 2008, ISBN 978-0785127024
- The Jungle Book includes material from Marvel Fanfare #8–11, 64 pages, April 2007
- Black Widow: Web of Intrigue collects Marvel Fanfare #10–13, 176 pages, April 2010, ISBN 978-0-7851-4475-5
- Thor: The Warriors Three collects Warriors Three stories from Marvel Fanfare #13 and #34–37, 136 pages, September 2010, ISBN 978-0785144809
- Doctor Strange & Doctor Doom: Triumph & Torment includes Namor the Sub-Mariner stories from Marvel Fanfare #16 and #43, 160 pages, 2013, ISBN 978-0-7851-8454-6
- Cloak & Dagger: Crime and Punishment includes Marvel Fanfare #19, 264 pages, June 2012, ISBN 978-0785161295
- Weirdworld includes Marvel Fanfare #24–26, 312 pages, April 2015, ISBN 978-0785162889
- The Incredible Hulk Visionaries — John Byrne includes the Hulk story from Marvel Fanfare #29, 208 pages, June 2008, ISBN 978-0785127055
- Essential Moon Knight vol. 3 includes Moon Knight stories from Marvel Fanfare #30 and 38–39, 528 pages, November 2009, ISBN 978-0-7851-3070-3
- Essential Silver Surfer vol. 2 includes Marvel Fanfare #51, 600 pages, June 2007, ISBN 978-0-7851-2700-0
- Women of Marvel: Celebrating Seven Decades includes Hellcat story from Marvel Fanfare #59, 1,160 pages, January 2011, ISBN 978-0785143260
- Uncanny X-Men Omnibus Volume 2 includes the Savage Land story from Marvel Fanfare #1–4, 912 pages, April 2014, ISBN 0-7851-8572-0

== See also ==
- Showcase
