= Bruce Jones (comics) =

American writer and artist

- Born: Bruce Eliot Jones; October 31, 1946 (age 80)
- Areas: Writer, artist
- Pseudonyms: Philip Roland, Bruce Elliot
- Notable works: Alien Worlds, Conan the Barbarian, The Incredible Hulk, Ka-Zar the Savage, Twisted Tales
- Awards: Inkpot Award 2004
- Spouse: April Campbell (m. 1984)

Bruce Eliot Jones (born 1946) whose pen names include Philip Roland and Bruce Elliot, is an American comic book writer, novelist, illustrator, and screenwriter whose work included writing Marvel Comics' The Incredible Hulk from 2001 to 2005.

== Biography ==
=== Early career ===
Jones broke into comics in 1969 when he moved to New York City from his native Kansas City, Missouri, looking for work as a comics artist. He made his professional debut with Major Publications' black-and-white horror-comics magazine Web of Horror #3 (cover dated April 1970), writing and drawing the six-page story "Point of View". Jones then wrote for Warren Publishing's black-and-white horror-comics Creepy and Eerie, and, under the pseudonym "Philip Roland", for rival Skywald Publications' line. During this time he wrote his first novel, The Contestants (Bee-Line, 1970).

Jones later freelanced for Marvel Comics, writing stories for Ka-Zar and Conan the Barbarian, as well as writing and drawing anthological science fiction and other stories for Marvel's black-and-white magazine line. In 1979, Jones met April Campbell and formed a writing partnership. From 1982 to 1984, Jones and Campbell, who formed the company Bruce Jones Associates, packaged, edited, and chiefly wrote the Pacific Comics titles Twisted Tales and Alien Worlds, as well as Somerset Holmes, Silverheels, and Pathways to Fantasy. When Pacific went bankrupt, subsequent issues were published by Eclipse Comics.

During this time, Eclipse published the four-issue limited series The Twisted Tales of Bruce Jones, with stories and almost all the artwork by Jones himself.

=== Later career ===
Jones wrote artist Richard Corben's Rip in Time five-issue miniseries (1986–1987), published by Fantagor Press. By the early 1990s, Jones had shifted to screenwriting, working on HBO's The Hitchhiker TV series and several television movies with writing partner and now-wife April Campbell Jones. He also wrote a series of thriller novels including Sprinter, Maximum Velocity, and Game Running. From 1990 to 1992, Jones took over as writer of the newspaper comic strip Flash Gordon, then drawn by Ralph Reese, occasionally assisted by Gray Morrow. He returned to Kansas City with his wife and children in 2000 and wrote two more novels, Still Life and Death Rites, under the pseudonym "Bruce Elliot".

In 2001, he was contacted by Marvel editor Axel Alonso, with whom Jones had worked when Alonso was at rival company DC Comics. Alonso offered him a job scripting the then-floundering comic The Incredible Hulk. Sales of the title rose significantly, and in 2003, Jones noted that he planned to stay on as Hulk writer "until they [Marvel] throw me off". However, the following year he signed a two-year contract with rival company DC Comics. In the interim, he scripted the five-issue series Call of Duty: The Precinct #1–5, a naturalistic drama about the New York City Police Department.

Other work includes a seven-issue stint on Nightwing, a Deadman series for Vertigo, and various limited series for DC comics, including Man-Bat, OMAC, and Vigilante.

In 2005, Jones' 10-page story "Jenifer" from Creepy #63 (July 1974), drawn by Bernie Wrightson, became the basis for filmmaker Dario Argento's segment of Masters of Horror, a Showtime television series.

== Personal life ==
Jones and his oft-times writing partner April Campbell have been married since 1984.

== Awards ==
Bruce Jones received an Inkpot Award in 2004.

== Bibliography ==
=== DC Comics ===
- Batman #345–346, 348–351 (Catwoman backup stories) (1982)
- Batman Villains Secret Files and Origins 2005 #1 (2005)
- Batman: Legends of the Dark Knight #207–211 (2006)
- Batman: Through the Looking Glass #1 (2012)
- Checkmate vol. 2 #26–31 (2008)
- DCU: Brave New World #1 (2006)
- Deadman #1–13 (2006–2007)
- Flinch #1, 4, 9, 12, 14 (1999–2000)
- Ghosts #109 (1982)
- House of Mystery #294–295, 298–309, 311–312, 320 (1981–1983)
- Man-Bat #1–5 (2006)
- Mystery in Space #117 (1981)
- Nightwing #118–124 (2006)
- OMAC vol. 3 #1–8 (2006–2007)
- Our Fighting Forces #139 (1972)
- Saga of the Swamp Thing #1 (Phantom Stranger backup story) (1982)
- Saga of the Swamp Thing Annual #1 (1982)
- Strange Adventures vol. 2 #2 (1999)
- Talent Showcase #18 (1985)
- Texas Chainsaw Massacre: Raising Cain #1–3 (2008)
- Vigilante vol. 2 #1–6 (2005–2006)
- The War that Time Forgot #1–12 (2008–2009)
- The Warlord vol. 3 #1–10 (2006–2007)
- Weird War Tales #103 (1981)
- Weird War Tales Special #1 (2000)
- Weird Western Tales vol. 2 #4 (2001)
- Wildstorm Winter Special #1 (Wildcats) (2005)
- Year One: Batman Scarecrow #1–2 (2005)

=== Eclipse Comics ===
- Alien Encounters #6–9 (1986)
- Alien Worlds #8–9 (1984–1985)
- Somerset Holmes #5–6 (1984)
- Tales of Terror #4, 6–7, 9 (1986)
- The Twisted Tales of Bruce Jones #1–4 (1986)

=== Marvel Comics ===
- The Amazing Spider-Man Annual #26 (1992)
- Bizarre Adventures #29, 33 (1981, 1982)
- Call of Duty: The Precinct #1–5 (2002–2003)
- Captain America: Red, White & Blue HC (2002)
- Captain America: What Price Glory #1–4 (2003)
- Clive Barker's Hellraiser #15 (1992)
- Conan the Barbarian #131–134, 136–144, 147–149 (1982–1983)
- Daredevil: The Movie #1 (2003)
- Epic Illustrated #3 (1980)
- Heroes for Hope Starring the X-Men #1 (1985)
- Hulk and Thing: Hard Knocks #1–4 (2004–2005)
- Hulk/Wolverine: Six Hours #1–4 (2003)
- Hulk: The Official Movie Adaptation #1 (2003)
- The Incredible Hulk vol. 3 #34–76 (2002–2004)
- Ka-Zar the Savage #1–27 (1981–1983)
- Kingpin #1–7 (2003–2004)
- Kull the Conqueror #1 (1983)
- Marvel Comics Presents #13 (Shanna the She-Devil) (1989)
- Marvel Feature #2–5 (Red Sonja) (1976)
- Marvel Graphic Novel: Arena (1989)
- Marvel Holiday Special #2 (Punisher) (1993)
- Moon Knight: Divided We Fall #1 (1992)
- Savage Sword of Conan #8, 64, 67, 70, 72, 77, 79–82, 157 (1975–1989)
- The Spectacular Spider-Man Annual #12 (1992)
- Spider-Man's Tangled Web #7–9 (2001–2002)
- Unknown Worlds of Science Fiction #2–6, Annual #1 (1975–1976)
- Venom: The Enemy Within #1–3 (1994)
- Web of Spider-Man Annual #8 (1992)
- Wolverine: Xisle #1–5 (2003)
- X-Men Unlimited #46, 48 (2003)

=== Pacific Comics ===
- Alien Worlds #1–7 (1983–1984)
- Silverheels #1–3 (1983–1984)
- Somerset Holmes #1–4 (1983–1984)
- Three Dimensional Alien Worlds #1 (1984)
- Twisted Tales #1–8 (1982–1984)

Preceded by n/a	Ka-Zar the Savage writer 1981–1983	Succeeded by Mike Carlin
Preceded by Paul Jenkins and Sean McKeever	The Incredible Hulk vol. 3 writer 2002–2004	Succeeded by Peter David
Preceded by Devin K. Grayson	Nightwing writer 2006	Succeeded by Marv Wolfman
Preceded by Greg Rucka	Checkmate vol. 2 writer 2008	Succeeded by n/a
