= Heroes, Inc. Presents Cannon =

- Heroes, Inc. Presents Cannon (1969), cover art by Wally Wood.

Publication information
- Publisher: Issue #1: Wally Wood; Issue #2: CPL Gang Publications
- Publication date: Issue #1: 1969; Issue #2: 1976
- Main character(s): Cannon; The Misfits; Dragonella

Creative team
- Writer(s): Wally Wood, Ron Whyte
- Artist(s): Wally Wood, Steve Ditko, Ralph Reese

Heroes, Inc. Presents Cannon is a two-issue comic book series that represents one of the earliest independent comics. The first issue was self-published by prominent writer-artist Wally Wood in 1969, with a second issue published by CPL Gang Publications in 1976.

This comic-book series is unrelated to the organization HEROES, Inc. ("Honor Every Responsible Officer's Eternal Sacrifice"), a Washington, D.C., aid group for families of police and firefighters killed in the line of duty.

== Publication history ==
Writer-artist Wally Wood, who by 1969 had had a critically admired two decades in comic books, self-published the first issue of his mature-audience comic Heroes, Inc. Presents Cannon that year, after having already self-published a similar anthology, witzend. These comics, along with such titles by other publishers as Star Reach (1974), Big Apple Comix (1975), and American Splendor (1976), helped bridge the gap between the countercultural underground comics and traditional mainstream fare, providing genre stories for an adult audience. Like those other examples, it was a forerunner of the late-1970s rise of the modern graphic novel and the 1980s independent-comic publishing boom.

Created for the military readership Wood had cultivated with his "Sally Forth" feature in Military News and Overseas Weekly, the first issue contained no U.S. Postal Service indicia. The only publishing information was on an editorial page that gave the office address as "Armed Forces Dist., P.O. Box 23635, Pleasant Hill, Calif." Not targeted at children and carrying no Comics Code seal, it contained more action/combat violence and more revealing clothing on young women than did mainstream comics, though it did not contain nudity or gore; most deaths occurred in silhouette, off-panel or indeterminately within battle scenes. The glossy cover promoted "Amazing Adult Adventure".

In October 2005, Heritage Auctions auctioned off a lot containing approximately 70,000 copies of the issue.

=== First issue ===
The 32-page, color comic book featured three stories with original characters. Priced at 15 cents when a typical comic book cost 12 cents, it bore no issue number. The cover was signed "Wally Wood 1969". The inside front cover bore a full-page ad for Mesa Hills home sites, P.O. Box 788m Santa Fe, New Mexico. A full-page ad following the first story advertised National Diamond Sales, 437 12th Street, Oakland, California. The following page contained two stacked, half-page public-service ads, one for the U.S.O., the other for U.S. Savings Bonds. A Military Diamond Sales ad after the second story gave the same address as the editorial office. Following the stories came a full-page ad for U.S. Diamond Sales, 1128 Broadway, Oakland, California. The inside back cover contained the text piece "Salute to a Medal of Honor Winner", with a black-and-white photo of U.S. Marine Corps Corporal Robert E. O'Malley. The back cover was yet another diamond-company ad, for Armed Forces Diamond Sales, 1126 Broadway, Oakland, California.

The 12-page "Cannon", written and inked by Wood, penciled by Steve Ditko and credited as "Wally Wood 1969" and "Art by Ditko and Wood", was an espionage adventure starring the titular C.I.A. agent, who has been brainwashed so deeply during capture by Cold War Communists that, when recovered by the United States military, scientists "go all the way" and continue brainwashing him as a covert assassin for the U.S. He is assigned to rescue or assassinate Jean Voss, a young member of an American anti-missile defense lab, who was kidnapped by Asian, presumably Red Chinese, Communists with a base on the Yucatán Peninsula.

"Cannon" went on to be published in serial form, in the U.S. Army's Overseas Weekly, starting in 1971.

"The Misfits", a 10-page story written and penciled by Wood, inked by Ralph Reese and credited "W. Wood and R. Reese" and "Copyright Wally Wood 1969", follows Mystra, a young artificial human with telepathic abilities; Shag, a boyish blue extraterrestrial stranded on Earth; and Glomb, a human infant mutated by American scientists into a gray, simpleminded giant created to explore the planet Jupiter. Captives of the government's "Operation Misfit", they escape, only to confront an albino alien invader.

Heroes, Inc. Presents Cannon #2 (1976), cover art by Wally Wood.

Reflecting less-enlightened times, page two of "The Misfits" includes this dialog from English-speaking officials at the scene of a spaceship landing:

"A man just emerged from the ship... Hey! It's a white man..."
"Well, that's a good sign, anyway...."

The five-page "Dragonella" credited "Script by Ron Whyte and W. Wood", with art by Wood, and noted "Copyright Wally Wood 1969", is a humorous adventure of a fairy-tale baby abandoned in the woods and raised into young womanhood by kindly dragons "of the ancient and noble family Isaurus". Named Dragonella, she eventually ventures forth seeking a prince to marry, accompanied by her dragon "brother", St. George.

Before the final story is a letter-from-the-editor page, hand-lettered on a montage of Wood art and signed "Sincerely, Wallace Wood".

=== Second issue ===
Published in 1976 by CPL Gang Publications—which published the fanzines CPL (Contemporary Pictorial Literature) and Charlton Bullseye before its various editors and artists, including Roger Slifer and Roger Stern, turned professional—this magazine-sized second issue carried a $2 cover price.

It contains an untitled, seven-page "The Misfits" story written and drawn by Wood; the superhero feature "The Black Angel", with the seven-page story "Beware the Sirens” by co-writers Mike Vosburg and Roger Stern, drawn by Vosburg; and an untitled, 14-page "Cannon" story, written and inked by Wood and drawn by Ditko.

In addition, the inside front cover contained a full-page Wood illustration of the character Dynamo, from Tower Comics' T.H.U.N.D.E.R. Agents; a two-page centerspread illustration of the original character Kadavahr the Resurrected, by John Byrne, plus an additional page of Byrne art; and a back-cover illustration by Wood of the original character Animan.

The covers for both issues were colored by Marie Severin.
