= E-Man =

- E-Man #1 (First Comics)

Publication information
- Publisher: Charlton Comics (1973–75), First Comics (1983–86), Comico (1989–90), Alpha Productions (1993–94), Digital Webbing (2006–08)
- First appearance: E-Man #1 (1973)
- Created by: Nicola Cuti; Joe Staton

In-story information
- Alter ego: Alec Tronn
- Abilities: Energy-based

E-Man is a comic-book character, a superhero created by writer Nicola Cuti and artist Joe Staton for the American company Charlton Comics in 1973. Although the character's original series was short-lived, the lightly humorous hero has become a cult classic occasionally revived by different independent comics publishers. The character was originally owned by Charlton but was eventually transferred to its creators.

== Publication history ==
After editor Dick Giordano left the Derby, Connecticut-based Charlton Comics, in 1968, the publisher ended its superhero line. A later editor, George Wildman, persuaded the publisher to try superheroes again, prompting writer Nicola Cuti and artist Joe Staton to devise E-Man.

Cuti said that his inspirations included the Golden Age of Comics superhero Plastic Man, such that he wanted to create a similarly fun and whimsical character. Cuti also admired Albert Einstein and his formula E=mc^{2}. He conceived a character who was caught in a factory explosion and became an energy being that could take on the form of any type of matter. When he shared this idea with artist Joe Staton, Staton felt the origin was too similar to that of Charlton's Captain Atom and the atomic-accident origins that had often been used by Marvel Comics writer-editor Stan Lee. Inspired by the works of Arthur C. Clarke, Cuti created a new origin that made E-Man a packet of sentient energy created as a star went nova.

Cuti asked Staton to design the costume, requiring only that the character not wear a cape and that the formula E=mc^{2} be his chest emblem. Staton based E-Man's face on that of actor Roger Moore, making him appear heroic but somewhat generic. When Staton delivered his design to Cuti, Cuti colored it with yellows and oranges to differentiate it from the reds and blues so frequently in other superhero costumes.

E-Man took a light whimsical tone to differentiate itself from super hero comics at Marvel and DC. Cuti enjoyed scripting wisecracking banter between E-Man and his girlfriend, Nova Kane, inspired by films like The Thin Man and Mr. and Mrs. North. He, however, did not intend to spoof superhero comics, but present serious situations that the characters could make light of. Inspired by the work of Wally Wood in MAD magazine, Staton inserted sight gags into each issue.

Cuti promoted E-Man in advance of the first issue by sending letters to assorted fanzines, such as Rocket's Blast ComiCollector and The Comic Reader, with a photostat illustration of the titular hero. The letter announced Charlton's re-entrance into the superhero genre and promised that one-third of each issue would feature a new superhero, an idea suggested by Wildman to try out new superhero properties.

=== Charlton Comics ===
E-Man first appeared in E-Man #1, cover-dated October 1973, on a bi-monthly publishing schedule. In the first issue, E-Man tangles with "the Brain from Sirius", a giant villainous pink brain in a clear Plexiglas dome who crash-lands on Earth and wants to detonate its "hate bomb". The series ran for 10 issues until cover date September 1975.

Cuti suggested the title "E-Mail", for the series' letter column, a term not yet in common use. The last four issues, along with other Charlton titles, featured painted covers after Charlton began working with a Texas company that could do painted color separations cheaper than Charlton could do hand separations.

Due to a nationwide paper shortage caused by a Canadian paper-mill strike, six months passed between issues #2 and #3. This gave Cuti and Staton time to push other material back and produce a story titled "The Energy Crisis", a social commentary on the 1973 oil crisis. This gap in publication also gave Staton the opportunity to refine the title's art style, making it darker and moodier.

E-Man was Charlton's lowest-selling title on newsstands but was the company's best-selling subscription. When Wildman told Cuti that the title was to be cancelled after issue #10, he explained that the publisher had allowed it to continue publication to that point only out of loyalty to Cuti. CPL Gang publisher Bob Layton agreed to publish E-Man stories in the fanzine Charlton Bullseye, but only a single story saw print, "...And Why the Sea Is Boiling Hot" in issue #4 of that title.

Steve Ditko's "Killjoy", a two-issue backup feature.

All issues of E-Man except for #8 featured a backup story:

- "The Knight", by Cuti and artist Tom Sutton, appeared in the first issue, starring a superspy agent of C.H.E.S.S.
- "The Dragon Killer", by writer Joe Gill and artist Wayne Howard, appeared in issue #3, which featured Travis, a time-travelling youngster.
- "Killjoy", written and illustrated by Steve Ditko, appeared in issues #2 and #4, expressing a similar tone and philosophy as another Ditko creation, Mr. A. The stories featured a silent but frenetic hero battling criminals who protested that Killjoy's constant interruption of their crimes was a violation of their rights.
- In E-Man #5, "The City Swallower" featured a character based on Heidi Saha, the science-fiction and comic-book costume and cosplay legend.
- "Liberty Belle", by artist Joe Gill and artist Steve Ditko, was featured in issue #5. The character was to be the company's "women's libber". Artists Mike Vosburg and Dan Adkins worked on the character's development but were replaced by Ditko.
- "Rog-2000" was featured in issues #6, #7, #9 and #10, written by Cuti with artist John Byrne making his professional comics debut. Rog-2000 was the most popular of the back-up features and Byrne had several ideas to expand the character into its own title. Staton and Byrne formed a friendly rivalry during the feature's run, with each of them inserting sight gags to jab at the other.

A supporting character, the grubby but right-hearted detective Michael Mauser, got his own backup series in Charlton's Vengeance Squad. In 1977, six issues were reprinted under the Modern Comics label for sale as bagged sets in North American discount department stores.

=== First Comics ===
When Staton became art director at First Comics, the publisher acquired the rights to the character from Charlton and launched a series. Cuti was asked to write the title, but his obligations to DC Comics prevented him from accepting. The series was initially written by Martin Pasko, who had previously worked with Staton on Plastic Man and Metal Men. After Pasko's run, Staton and Paul Kupperberg wrote the series until Cuti took over as writer with issue #24.

As a direct-market publisher not distributed to newsstands, the First series was not obligated to seek Comics Code Authority approval and could address more mature topics than Code-approved comics. Where the Charlton series featured broad whimsical themes, the First Comics series engaged in more specific satire directed at targets including the X-Men, Steven Spielberg, and Scientology.

The first 10 issues each contained a one-page parody of the Hostess snack advertisements that ran in comics through the 1970s and 1980s. These parodies were written and drawn by various creators and featured characters from across the independent comics industry. These parodies included:

- Rog-2000 by John Byrne
- Mike Mist by Max Allan Collins and Terry Beatty
- Pudge, Girl Blimp by Lee Marrs
- Teddy-Q by Bruce Patterson
- Omaha the Cat Dancer by Reed Waller
- Fred Hembeck by Hembeck himself
- Cutey Bunny by Joshua Quagmire
- Nexus by Mike Baron and Steve Rude
- Buck Godot by Phil Foglio
- Issue #10 did not feature comics characters but parodied the First Comics office; it was written and drawn by Bruce Patterson.

E-Man ended with issue #25. It was followed by the seven issue mini-series The Original E-Man and Michael Mauser, reprinting the Charlton series and Mauser's backup stories in Vengeance Squad. Issue #7 of the miniseries featured a previously unpublished story introducing E-Man's sister Vamfire.

During the mid-1980s run, Staton acquired rights to the character from First, although First Comics retained ownership of their publications. As Staton described:

The deal with E-Man was that I had an arrangement with First Comics so that they bought the rights to E-Man from Charlton, and then I was to repay First all their expense out of my royalties. The rights to E-Man were then supposed to revert to me completely. But some of us needed more lawyers than we knew, and the end result of how it stands, as I understand it, is that I have the right to do any new E-Man stories I want to, and I have the right to license any new E-Man material I want. Ken Levin, the lawyer for First, controls the rights to what First published. To keep the rights unified, Ken and I decided he would represent the whole E-Man package. ... [W]hatever I get in, Nick [Cuti] gets 50%, but so far, it's been nothing.

=== Later publications ===
In 1989, Comico published an E-Man one-shot (Sept. 1989) by Cuti and Staton followed by a three-issue miniseries (Jan.-March 1990). After Comico's demise, Alpha Productions issued two one-shot publications, E-Man (Sept. 1993) and E-Man Returns (1994).

E-Man appeared in the two-page story "Come and Grow Old With Me", by Cuti and Staton, published in the magazine Comic Book Artist #12 (March 2001).

In 2006, Cuti and Staton produced three one-shots released by Digital Webbing Press: E-Man: Recharged (Oct. 2006); E-Man: Dolly (Sept. 2007); and E-Man: Curse of the Idol, per its cover-logo trademark, a.k.a. E-Man: The Idol, as copyrighted, per its postal indicia (Nov. 2008) abetted by co-writer Randy Buccini on the third. The indicia for each listed E-Man as copyrighted by "Joe Staton/First Comics".

A previously unpublished E-Man story (done originally for Alpha Productions) by Cuti & Staton saw print in Charlton Spotlight #6 (2008) along with an unpublished Mike Mauser story.

In 2011, E-Man appeared in War of the Independents, a (still-unfinished) crossover mini-series by Dave Ryan featuring more than 200 independent and creator-owned characters.

Since 2014, Cuti and Staton have been collaborating on a new three-part E-Man story, which was to be published in an issue of Charlton Action, a tribute comic fanzine celebrating Charlton's legacy. Staton said at the time that he was approaching the project as the final E-Man story. The story was finally published in three issues of a rebooted Charlton Arrow in 2017 and 2018.

== Fictional character biography ==
E-Man is a sentient packet of energy thrown off by a nova. Traveling the galaxy it learned about life, how to duplicate the appearance of life, and about good and evil. Reaching Earth, it met exotic dancer/grad student Katrinka Colchnzski (who attended Xanadu University), also known as Nova Kane, and formed itself into a superhero dubbed E-Man, with a civilian identity dubbed "Alec Tronn" (electron). His emblem was the famous mass-energy equivalence formula "E=mc^{2}", and his powers included firing energy blasts from his hands and transforming his body into anything he could envision (e.g., turning his feet into jet engines so he could fly).

E-Man's origin was expanded by retcon in Charlton issue #10 and in the First Comics series.

Nova was later caught in a nuclear explosion, gained the same powers as E-Man, and became his partner; later still, she lost her powers (in a parody of X-Men's Phoenix) and then regained them. During their early adventures they acquired a pet koala named Teddy Q, whose intelligence grew to the point where he had a job waiting tables in a café.

== See also ==
- The F-Men
