= CPL Gang =

The CPL Gang was a group of comic book enthusiasts who published a number of fanzines in the mid-1970s, including Contemporary Pictorial Literature (CPL) and Charlton Bullseye. Founded by Roger Stern and Bob Layton, the CPL Gang eventually included Roger Slifer, Duffy Vohland, Tony Isabella, Don Maitz, Michael Uslan, Steven Grant, and John Byrne, all of whom later became comics professionals.

== History ==
=== CPL ===
Layton and Stern began publishing the CPL fanzine out of Layton's Indianapolis apartment. Stern recalls that "CPL started out as Bob's sale catalog. Bob was drawing the covers and including little reviews written by some of his customers".

By issue #5, CPL "... turned into a small 'zine with a catalog insert, and [Stern] started writing short articles for it. [He] eventually became an editor of sorts". CPL featured a mix of articles, interviews, columns, art, and comics strips. In addition to CPL Gang members, contributors included established industry professionals like Gil Kane, Alex Toth, Paul Gulacy, Mike Vosburg, Dan Adkins, P. Craig Russell, and Joe Sinnott. Rog-2000, the John Byrne-created CPL "mascot", went on to become a character in the Charlton Comics universe.

CPL rapidly became a popular fan publication, and led to Layton and Stern forming an alliance with Charlton Comics to produce and publish a one-shot called Charlton Portfolio (actually CPL #9/10) in 1974, which included the unpublished sixth issue of Blue Beetle vol. 5 (1967 series).

Twelve issues of CPL were published. An issue #13 was promised, but was never published.

=== Charlton Bullseye ===
The success of Charlton Portfolio convinced Charlton of the merits of a "fan" publication. During the mid-1970s, both Marvel and DC were publishing in-house fan publications (F.O.O.M. and The Amazing World of DC Comics respectively), and Charlton wished to make inroads into the superhero market, as well as "establish a fan presence".

Charlton gave Layton and Stern "access to unpublished material from their vaults by the likes of Steve Ditko, Jeff Jones and a host of others" for use in Charlton Bullseye, which published five issues from 1975–1976.

=== Professional springboard ===
Layton's association with Charlton (and the company's production manager Bill Pearson) in turn led to him becoming acquainted with the legendary Wally Wood, with whom he apprenticed. This apprenticeship led to work for Charlton (on anthology titles, but not working from the Charlton offices), Marvel Comics and DC Comics, while still publishing fanzines. Along with Bill Pearson's Wonderful Publishing Company, the CPL Gang co-published issue #10 of the Wally Wood-founded witzend comics anthology in 1976.

By 1976, Layton, Stern, and most of the other members were full-fledged comics professionals, and the CPL Gang disbanded to pursue their burgeoning careers.

== Titles published ==
- Contemporary Pictorial Literature (CPL) #1–12 (c. 1973–1975)
- Charlton Bullseye #1–5 (1975–1976)
- Heroes, Inc. Presents Cannon #2 (Wally Wood, 1976)
- witzend #10 (co-published with Bill Pearson's Wonderful Publishing Company, 1976)
