= Rog-2000 =

- Pacific Comics' one-shot (July 1982), cover by John Byrne.

Publication information
- First appearance: fanzine: CPL #11 (1974) comics: E-Man #6 (Jan. 1975)
- Created by: John Byrne

In-story information
- Species: Robot
Rog-2000

Rog-2000 (pronounced "Rahj-two-thousand", and sometimes spelled "ROG 2000") is a fictional robot that was the first professional creation of comic book artist-writer John Byrne. Rog-2000 serves as the mascot of Byrne Robotics.

== Publication history ==
Detail from Rog-2000's first appearance, CPL #11 (1974).

The character began life during Byrne's fan-artist days in the 1970s, as a spot illustration for Roger Stern and Bob Layton's fanzine CPL (Contemporary Pictorial Literature). Layton gave the character a name (riffing on the amount of "Rogers" – specifically Roger Stern and Roger Slifer – who contributed to CPL), and he and Stern began using him as a magazine mascot, with Byrne supplying additional art. A Rog-2000 story, "The Coming of the Gang", appeared in CPL #11 (1974), written by Stern with art by Byrne and Layton, and featuring caricatures of "the CPL Gang", including Byrne and fellow CPL contributor Duffy Vohland.

On the strength of that fan piece, Charlton Comics writer Nicola Cuti contacted Byrne about drawing the character for professional comic books. During this same period, the CPL Gang was producing the officially sanctioned fanzine Charlton Bullseye. Written by Cuti, "Rog-2000" became one of several alternating backup features in the Charlton Comics superhero series E-Man, starting with the eight-page "That Was No Lady" in issue #6 (Jan. 1975). This marked the color-comics debut of future industry star Byrne, who'd previously drawn a two-page story for Skywald Publications' black-and-white horror-comics magazine Nightmare #20 (Aug. 1974). The character also appeared the same month in the small-press hobbyist magazine The Comic Reader #44 (Jan. 1975).

As Byrne recalled the character's origin in a 2000 interview:

I was doing a lot of spot illos [illustrations] for 'zines, mostly for Stern's and Layton's CPL (Contemporary Pictorial Literature). One of the doodles I sent in was a robot with his arm blown off. Layton and Stern turned this into an editorial gag illo, and, since there were several Rogers involved in CPL at the time, Layton named him ROG-2000. Then they asked for more drawings of the same robot. Since I had no access to a Xerox machine, I did not have a copy of the original drawing, so I recreated the character as best I could from memory. Later, Stern wrote a ROG-2000 story for CPL, which I illustrated. It was on the strength of this that Nick Cuti asked if I would like to do ROG for a backup feature in E-Man, which he would write.

Three additional, seven-page "Rog-2000" stories – "Withering Heights", "The Wish", and "Rog. vs. The Sog", all by Cuti & Byrne – appeared in E-Man #7, 9–10 (March, July–Sept. 1975), respectively. All the Charlton stories were reprinted in Pacific Comics' ROG 2000 #1 (June 1982), as well as in A-Plus Comics' Hot 'N Cold Heroes #1 (1990) and Herbie #4-4 (1991).

In a 2000 interview, Byrne recalled that:

We talked about a Rog book, and I even came up with a full-length story idea, a sequel to the sewer-monster story that was, if memory serves, the last published Rog story at Charlton. I think I even laid out a cover. But Charlton was not interested, and Marvel was beckoning rather relentlessly at that point. I'm not sure anymore who owns Rog. I had a handshake from [Charlton managing editor] George Wildman to the effect that Rog would always be mine, but we all know what Samuel Goldwyn said about verbal agreements! In any case, it has been so long since I did anything with Rog, I would not be at all surprised if the copyright has lapsed.

Stern was reunited with Rog-2000 when Charlton accepted two of his scripts for the feature, but the company then canceled E-Man the following workday.
