= Grass Green =

American cartoonist (1939–2002)

- Born: Richard Edward Green; May 7, 1939 Fort Wayne, Indiana
- Died: August 5, 2002 (aged 63) Fort Wayne, Indiana, U.S.
- Areas: Cartoonist, Penciller
- Notable works: Xal-Kor the Human Cat; Super Soul Comix
- Awards: Alley Award, 1966

Richard Edward "Grass" Green (May 7, 1939 – August 5, 2002) was an African American cartoonist notable for being the first black participant in both the 1960s fan art movement and the 1970s underground comics movement. In the 1960s, Green's Harvey Kurtzman-like zany, action-packed, humorous comics parodies appeared in numerous fanzines. His "outrageous" 1970s and 1980s underground work used searing humor to expose America's racism and bigotry.

== Biography ==
Born in Fort Wayne, Indiana, Green was given the nickname "Grass" by his childhood friend Ronn Foss, with whom he later collaborated in editing two issues of the magazine Alter Ego. Beginning in 1964, Green's fan art appeared in such fanzines as Alter Ego, Star-Studded Comics, Fantasy Illustrated, The Buyer's Guide to Comics Fandom, Rocket's Blast Comicollector, Komix Illustrated, Super-Hero, and Masquerader.

In 1967, Green broke into the professional comics world, collaborating with Roy Thomas on "The Shape" in Charlton Premiere #1. In the late 1960s, Green drew several more humorous strips for Charlton Comics, mostly in Go-Go Comics. (He also had work published in Bill Pearson's witzend.) He then became involved in the underground comix movement, where his work was published in Super Soul Comix (Kitchen Sink Press) and a Wildman and Rubberroy series. Super Soul Comix #1 (1972) sold 200,000 copies. In the 1990s, Green produced work for, among other places, Eros Comics.

=== Xal-Kor the Human Cat ===
Green's Xal-Kor the Human Cat is a classic Golden Age-type superhero. Sent from the planet Felis by the Great White Cat, Xal-Kor fights the Rat People with his Dimension Belt, which enables him to change form from a common house cat to a hybrid man-cat form, and then into a fully human form. As a human, his alter ego is photojournalist Colin Chambers.

Xal-Kor (who first appeared in 1964) was often voted the most popular fan creation in the fanzine Star-Studded Comics. The character returned several times over the years, most recently in May 2002 in a collection from TwoMorrows Publishing. Green was working on a new series of Xal-Kor adventures when he died in August 2002.

=== Holiday Out ===
Green collaborated for many years with writer Michael Vance, including for four years on the comic book strip Holiday Out, featuring the characters Plastic Mam and Rok. Holiday Out stories were collected in Holiday Out #1-3, from Renegade Press, as well as books like Comico Primer (Comico), and Mangazine (Antarctic Press); much of it was re-released in June 2002 from Blue Moon Comics.

=== REGCo ===
In the 1960s, Green founded the company REGCo, an acronym for his name, Richard Edward Green, which offered comic book artists and newspaper cartoonists ready-to-use layout art boards with borders and panels pre-drafted, delineated with non-repro blue ink. Green promoted this as a major time-saver for fellow artists, recognizing the time and tedium required for repeatedly laying out pages by hand. Although this was a practical idea, his business was only modestly successful, as many comic artists tend(ed) to be very particular about which type of art board they penciled and inked on.

Around 1963, effectively as art objects, Green hand-drew and hand-colored ten issues of his REGCO Variety Showcase strip-zine (an amateur fanzine that contains comic book stories). No reproduction copies were made from these "masters," so there is only one copy of each issue — each of the ten artifacts essentially eight pages of original artwork stapled together. #1 is in the holdings of Archive West, and #9 ("...Presents Twist-O") is in the collection of fanzine archivist Emanuel Maris.

== Personal life and death ==
Green was also a musician, who as a young man appeared on Ted Mack's The Original Amateur Hour. On the Ted Mack show, Green won the talent contests with his singing, guitar-playing, and comedy performances, and, for a short time, he became a local celebrity, which offered him an opportunity to perform professionally at various clubs around the Fort Wayne area.

Green died of lung cancer in Fort Wayne, Indiana, on August 5, 2002. He was survived by his wife, Janice.

== Awards ==
Green won a 1966 Alley Award for Best Fan Comic Strip for "Xal-Kor."
