= Sally Forth (Wally Wood comic strip) =

American comic strip by Wally Wood

- Sally Forth, from a French trade paperback collection, art by Wally Wood.

Publication information
- Publisher: Armed Forces Diamond Sales; Overseas Weekly
- First appearance: Military News (June 1968)
- Created by: Wally Wood

In-story information
- Partnerships: Lt Q.P. Dahl, Kicky McCann, Wild Bill Yonder, Hairy James, Snorky
Sally Forth
Creative team
- Written by: Wally Wood
- Artist(s): Wally Wood; Nick Cuti; Paul Kirchner; Larry Hama
- Editor: Bill Pearson
Collected editions
- The Compleat Sally Forth: ISBN 1-56097-291-2

Sally Forth is an American comic strip and sex farce created by Wally Wood for a military male readership, featuring a sexy action-adventure character who is often depicted nude. Her name is a play on words – "to sally forth" means to leave or attack from a military encampment.

It is unrelated to Greg Howard's Sally Forth, a daily newspaper comic strip about an American housewife that began in 1982.

== Overview ==
Sally Forth began as a recruit in a commando unit in the June 1968 Military News, a 16-page tabloid from Armed Forces Diamond Sales.

In 1976, Wood recalled:

It all started in 1968, when I was asked to do a complete comic section for a proposed tabloid newspaper for servicemen, four pages of full-color, service-oriented humor strips ... There was a high-flying lowlife named 'Wild Bill Yonder', a couple of others that for some reason escape my memory ... (such an embarrassment) and one that I felt, and still feel, had a great name for a comic heroine ... Sally Forth.

Sally returned on July 26, 1971, in the Overseas Weekly, a tabloid intended for U.S. military men serving outside North America. With Wood getting an assist from writer-artists Nick Cuti, Paul Kirchner and Larry Hama, Sally Forth continued in the Overseas Weekly until April 22, 1974. The Sally Forth comics were translated into Dutch during the late 1970s. The character was named Doortje Stoot and it appeared in the male-oriented magazine Gummi.

Wood collected the strip in a series of four oversize (10"x12") magazines. In 1993–95, writer-editor Bill Pearson, Wood's friend and an associate of the Wood Studio, reformatted the strips into a series of comics published by Eros Comix, an imprint of Fantagraphics. During 1998, Pearson edited the entire run into a single 160-page volume also published by Fantagraphics.

Near the end of his life, two pornographic Sally Forth stories featuring Sally and Bill Yonder were created and published by Wood in the adult comic book series Gang Bang #1 in 1980 and #2 in 1981.

== Characters ==
Sally in one of her more popular "uniforms"

- Sally Forth: Provides fan service and distractions to enemy males.
- Lt. Q. P. Dahl: Commander of the unit, who is half the height of everyone else and looks like a child. The name is a play on the phrase "kewpie doll".
- Kicky McCann: Martial arts expert.
- Wild Bill Yonder: The team's pilot, the name is a play on the phrase "wide blue yonder", meaning sky.
- Hairy James: Weapons and demolitions expert.
- Snorky: Resident Martian.

== See also ==
- Little Annie Fanny
- Pussycat
- Torchy
