= Wally Wood =

American comic strip cartoonist and illustrator (1927–1981)

- Self-portrait by Wood
- Born: Wallace Allan Wood; June 17, 1927 Menahga, Minnesota, U.S.
- Died: November 2, 1981 (aged 54) Los Angeles, California, U.S.
- Areas: Cartoonist, Writer, Penciller, Inker, Publisher
- Pseudonym: Woody
- Awards: List: National Cartoonists Society Comic Book Division awards, 1957, 1959, and 1965. Alley Award, Best Pencil Artist, 1965 Alley Award, Best Inking Work, 1966 Angoulême International Comics Festival, Best Foreign Cartoonist Award, 1978 Jack Kirby Hall of Fame, 1989 The Will Eisner Award Hall of Fame, 1992 Inkwell Awards Joe Sinnott Hall of Fame (2011)

Wallace Allan Wood (June 17, 1927 – November 2, 1981) was an American comic book writer, artist and independent publisher, widely known for his work on EC Comics's titles such as Weird Science, Weird Fantasy, and MAD Magazine from its inception in 1952 until 1964, as well as for T.H.U.N.D.E.R. Agents, and work for Warren Publishing's Creepy. He drew a few early issues of Marvel's Daredevil and established the title character's distinctive red costume. Wood created and owned the long-running characters Sally Forth and Cannon.

He wrote, drew, and self-published two of the three graphic novels of his magnum opus, The Wizard King trilogy, about Odkin son of Odkin before his (Wood’s) death by suicide.

Much of his early professional artwork is signed Wallace Wood; some people call him Wally Wood, a name he disliked. Within the comics community, he was also known as Woody, a name he sometimes used as a signature.

In addition to Wood's hundreds of comic book pages, he illustrated for books and magazines while also working in a variety of other areas – advertising; packaging and product illustrations; gag cartoons; record album covers; posters; syndicated comic strips; and trading cards, including work on Topps's landmark Mars Attacks set.

EC publisher William Gaines once stated, "Wally may have been our most troubled artist ... I'm not suggesting any connection, but he may have been our most brilliant".

He was the inaugural inductee into the comic book industry's Jack Kirby Hall of Fame in 1989, and was inducted into the Will Eisner Comic Book Hall of Fame in 1992.

== Biography ==
=== Early life and career ===
Wallace Wood was born June 17, 1927, in Menahga, Minnesota. He began reading and drawing comics at an early age. He was strongly influenced by the art styles of Alex Raymond's Flash Gordon, Milton Caniff's Terry and the Pirates, Hal Foster's Prince Valiant, Will Eisner's The Spirit and especially Roy Crane's Wash Tubbs. Recalling his childhood, Wood said that his dream at age six, about finding a magic pencil that could draw anything, foretold his future as an artist. Wood graduated from high school in 1944, signed on with the United States Merchant Marine at the close of World War II and enlisted in the U.S. Army's 11th Airborne Division in 1946. He went from training at Fort Benning, Georgia, to occupied Japan, where he was assigned to the island of Hokkaidō.

In 1947, at age 20, Wood enrolled in the Minneapolis School of Art but only lasted one term. Arriving in New York City with his brother Glenn and mother Alma (of Finnish descent), after his military discharge in July 1948, Wood found employment at Bickford's restaurant as a busboy. During his time off he carried his thick portfolio of drawings all over midtown Manhattan, visiting every publisher he could find. He briefly attended the Hogarth School of Art but dropped out after one semester. In 1948, he enrolled in the Cartoonists and Illustrators School (now known as the School of Visual Arts), staying less than one year (although he made a number of professional contacts which helped him later).

By October, after being rejected by every company he visited, Wood met fellow artist John Severin in the waiting room of a small publisher. After the two shared their experiences attempting to find work, Severin invited Wood to visit his studio, the Charles William Harvey Studio, where Wood met Charlie Stern, Harvey Kurtzman (who was working for Timely/Marvel) and Will Elder. At this studio Wood learned that Will Eisner was looking for a Spirit background artist. He immediately visited Eisner and was hired on the spot.

Over the next year, Wood also became an assistant to George Wunder, who had taken over the Milton Caniff strip Terry and the Pirates. Wood cited his "first job on my own" as Chief Ob-stacle, a continuing series of strips for a 1949 political newsletter. He entered the comic book field by lettering, as he recalled in 1981: "The first professional job was lettering for Fox romance comics in 1948. This lasted about a year. I also started doing backgrounds, then inking. Most of it was the romance stuff. For complete pages, it was $5 a page ... Twice a week, I would ink ten pages in one day".

Artists' representative Renaldo Epworth helped Wood land his early comic-book assignments, making it unclear if that connection led to Wood's lettering or to his comics-art debut, the ten-page story "The Tip Off Woman" [sic] in the Fox Comics Western Women Outlaws No. 4 (cover-dated January 1949, on sale late 1948). Wood's next known comic-book art did not appear until Fox's My Confession No. 7 (August 1949), at which time he began working almost continuously on the company's similar My Experience, My Secret Life, My Love Story and My True Love: Thrilling Confession Stories. His first signed work is believed to be in My Confession #8 (October 1949), with the name "Woody" half-hidden on a theater marquee. He penciled and inked two stories in that issue: "I Was Unwanted" (nine pages) and "My Tarnished Reputation" (ten pages).

Wood began at EC co-penciling and co-inking with Harry Harrison the story "Too Busy For Love" (Modern Love #5), and fully penciling the lead story, "I Was Just a Playtime Cowgirl", in Saddle Romances No. 11 (April 1950), inked by Harrison.

=== 1950s ===
Working from a Manhattan studio at West 64th Street and Columbus Avenue, Wood began to attract attention in 1950 with his science-fiction artwork for EC and Avon Comics, some in collaboration with Joe Orlando. During this period, he drew in a wide variety of subjects and genres, including adventure, romance, war and horror; message stories (for EC's Shock SuspenStories); and eventually satirical humor for writer/editor Harvey Kurtzman in Mad including a satire of the lawsuit Superman's publisher DC filed against Captain Marvel's publisher Fawcett called "Superduperman!" battling Captain Marbles.

Wood was instrumental in convincing EC publisher William Gaines to start a line of science fiction comics, Weird Science and Weird Fantasy (later combined under the single title Weird Science-Fantasy). Wood penciled and inked several dozen EC science fiction stories. Wood also had frequent entries in Two-Fisted Tales and Tales from the Crypt, as well as the later EC titles Valor, Piracy, and Aces High.

Working over scripts and pencil breakdowns by Jules Feiffer, the 25-year-old Wood drew two months of Will Eisner's Sunday-supplement newspaper comic book The Spirit, on the 1952 story arc "The Spirit in Outer Space". Eisner, Wood recalled, paid him "about $30 a week for lettering and backgrounds on The Spirit. Sometimes he paid $40 when I did the drawings, too".

Books illustrated by Wood

Feiffer, in 2010, recalled Wood's studio, "which was at that time in the very slummy Upper West Side [of Manhattan] in the [West] 60s, years before it was [the] Lincoln Center [area]. It was a cartoonist and science-fiction writers' ghetto – just a huge room where the walls were knocked down, dark, smelly, roach-infested, and all these cartoonists and writers bent over their tables. One was [science-fiction writer] Harry Harrison."

Between 1957 and 1967, Wood produced both covers and interior illustrations for more than 60 issues of the science-fiction magazine Galaxy Science Fiction, illustrating stories by such authors as Isaac Asimov, Philip K. Dick, Jack Finney, C. M. Kornbluth, Frederik Pohl, Robert Silverberg, Robert Sheckley, Clifford D. Simak and Jack Vance. He painted six covers for Galaxy Science Fiction Novels between 1952 and 1958. His gag cartoons appeared in the men's magazines Dude, Gent and Nugget. He inked the first eight months of the 1958–1961 syndicated comic strip Sky Masters of the Space Force, penciled by Jack Kirby.

Wood expanded into book illustrations, including for the picture-cover editions (though not the dust-jacket editions) of titles in the 1959 Aladdin Books reissues of Bobbs Merrill's 1947 "Childhood of Famous Americans" series.

=== Silver Age and Bronze Age ===
Wood additionally did art and stories for many different comic-book companies – including Marvel (and its 1950s iteration Atlas Comics), DC (including House of Mystery and Jack Kirby's Challengers of the Unknown), and Warren (Creepy, Eerie, 1984), Avon (Eerie, Strange Worlds), Charlton (War and Attack, Jungle Jim), Fox (Martin Kane, Private Eye), Gold Key (M.A.R.S. Patrol Total War, Fantastic Voyage), Harvey (Unearthly Spectaculars), King Comics (Jungle Jim), Atlas/Seaboard (The Destructor), Youthful (Captain Science) and the toy company Wham-O (Wham-O Giant Comics). In 1965, Wood, Len Brown, and possibly Larry Ivie created T.H.U.N.D.E.R. Agents for Tower Comics. He wrote and drew the 1967 syndicated Christmas comic strip Bucky's Christmas Caper. During the 1960s, Wood did many trading cards and humor products for Topps Chewing Gum, including concept roughs for Topps' famed 1962 Mars Attacks cards prior to the final art by Bob Powell and Norman Saunders.

Daredevil #7 (April 1964): Wood's best-known work for Marvel, debuting Daredevil's modern red costume.

For Marvel during the Silver Age of Comic Books, Wood's work as penciler-inker of Daredevil #5–8 and inker over Bob Powell of issues #9-11 established the title character's distinctive red costume (in issue #7). Wood and Stan Lee introduced the Stilt-Man in Daredevil #8 (June 1965). When Daredevil guest-starred in Fantastic Four #39–40, Wood inked that character, over Jack Kirby pencils, on the covers and throughout the interior.

Wood penciled and inked the first four 10-page installments of the company's "Dr. Doom" feature in Astonishing Tales #1–4 (Aug. 1970-Feb. 1971), and both wrote and drew self-contained horror/suspense tales in Tower of Shadows #5–8 (May–Nov. 1970), as well as sporadic other work.

Wood is known as the artist of the unsigned satirical Disneyland Memorial Orgy poster, which first appeared in Paul Krassner's magazine The Realist. The poster depicts a number of copyrighted Disney characters in various unsavory activities (including sex acts and drug use), with huge dollar signs radiating from Cinderella's Castle. Wood himself, as late as 1981, when asked who did that drawing, said only, "I'd rather not say anything about that! It was the most pirated drawing in history! Everyone was printing copies of that. I understand some people got busted for selling it. I always thought Disney stuff was pretty sexy ... Snow White, etc." Disney took no legal action against either Krassner or The Realist but did sue a publisher of a "blacklight" version of the poster, who used the image without Krassner's permission. The case was settled out of court.

At DC Comics, he and writer Jim Shooter launched the Captain Action comic book series in 1968. The following year, Wood briefly served as inker of the Superboy series. Discovering from Roy Thomas that Jack Kirby had returned to DC in 1970, Wood called editor Joe Orlando in an attempt to get the assignment to ink Kirby's new work, but that role was already filled by Vince Colletta. That same year, Wood was a ghost artist for an episode of Prince Valiant. Wood worked on various series for DC between 1975 and 1977, producing several covers for Plop! and inking the pencil artwork of Steve Ditko on Stalker and Jack Kirby on The Sandman. He worked on the Hercules Unbound series as well, providing inks for José Luis García-López and Walt Simonson. Wood inked and sometimes also pencilled All Star Comics, where, according to Mark Evanier, he made a point of expanding the bust-line of the heroine Power Girl by a half-inch every issue. Active with the 1970s Academy of Comic Book Arts, Wood contributed to several editions of the annual ACBA Sketchbook. In one of his final assignments, Wood returned to a character he helped define, inking Frank Miller's cover of Daredevil #164 (May 1980). His last known mainstream credit was inking Wonder Woman #269 (July 1980).

Over several decades, numerous artists worked at the Wood Studio. Associates and assistants included Dan Adkins, Richard Bassford, Howard Chaykin, Tony Coleman, Nick Cuti, Leo and Diane Dillon, Larry Hama, Russ Jones, Wayne Howard, Paul Kirchner, Joe Orlando, Bill Pearson, Al Sirois, Ralph Reese, Bhob Stewart, Tatjana Wood, and Mike Zeck.

=== Publisher ===
In 1966, Wood launched the independent magazine witzend (originally to be titled et cetera, a name which had to be withdrawn when Wood was told another magazine had already used this) one of the first alternative comics, a decade before Mike Friedrich's Star Reach or Flo Steinberg's Big Apple Comix (for which Wood drew the cover and contributed a story). Wood offered his fellow professionals the opportunity to contribute illustrations and graphic stories that detoured from the usual conventions of the comics industry. After the fourth issue, Wood turned witzend over to Bill Pearson, who continued as editor and publisher through the 1970s and into the 1980s. Wood additionally collected his feature Sally Forth, published in the U.S. servicemen's periodicals Military News and Overseas Weekly in 1968–1974, in a series of four oversize (10"x12") magazines. Pearson, in 1993–95, reformatted the strips into a series of comics published by Eros Comix, an imprint of Fantagraphics Books, which in 1998 collected the entire run into a single 160-page volume.

In 1969, Wood created another independent comic, Heroes, Inc. Presents Cannon, intended for his "Sally Forth" military readership as indicated in the ads and indicia. Artists Steve Ditko and Ralph Reese and writer Ron Whyte are credited with primary writer-artist Wood on three features: "Cannon", "The Misfits", and "Dragonella". A second magazine-format issue was published in 1976 by Wood and CPL Gang Publications. Larry Hama, one of Wood's assistants, said, "I did script about three Sally Forth stories and a few of the Cannon's. I wrote the main Sally Forth story in the first reprint book, which is actually dedicated to me, mostly because I lent Woody the money to publish it".

In 1980 and 1981, Wood did two issues of a pornographic comic book titled Gang Bang. It featured two sexually explicit Sally Forth stories, and sexually explicit satirical versions of Disney's Snow White and the Seven Dwarfs, titled So White and the Six Dorks; Terry and the Pirates, titled Perry and the Privates; Prince Valiant, titled Prince Violate; Superman and Wonder Woman, titled Stuporman Meets Blunder Woman; Flash Gordon, titled Flasher Gordon; and Tarzan titled Starzan. A third volume, published in 1983, contained three more sexually explicit parodies of Alice in Wonderland, titled Malice in Blunderland; a second Flash Gordon sendup titled Flesh Fucker Meets Women's Lib!; and The Wizard of Oz, titled The Blizzard of Ooze.

=== "Panels That Always Work" ===
Wood struggled to be as efficient as possible in the often low-paying comics industry. Over time he created a series of layout techniques sketched on pieces of paper which he taped up near his drawing table. These "visual notes," collected on three pages, reminded Wood (and select assistants he showed the pages to) of various layouts and compositional techniques to keep his pages dynamic and interesting. (In the same vein, Wood also taped up another note to himself: "Never draw anything you can copy, never copy anything you can trace, never trace anything you can cut out and paste up.")

In 1980, Wood's original, three-page, 24-panel (not 22) version of "Panels" was published with the proper copyright notice in The Wallace Wood Sketchbook (Crouch/Wood 1980). Around 1981, Wood's ex-assistant Larry Hama, by then an editor at Marvel Comics, pasted up photocopies of Wood's copyrighted drawings on a single page, which Hama titled "Wally Wood's 22 Panels That Always Work!!" (It was subtitled, "Or some interesting ways to get some variety into those boring panels where some dumb writer has a bunch of lame characters sitting around and talking for page after page!") Hama left out two of the original 24 panels as his photocopies were too faint to make out some of the lightest sketches. Hama distributed Wood's "elegantly simple primer to basic storytelling" to artists in the Marvel bullpen, who in turn passed them on to their friends and associates. Eventually, "22 Panels" made the rounds of just about every cartoonist or aspiring comic book artist in the industry and achieved its own iconic status.

Wood's "Panels That Always Work" is copyright Wallace Wood Properties, LLC as listed by the United States Copyright Office which assigned the work Registration Number VA0001814764.

==== Homages and tributes to "22 Panels" ====
In 1986, Tom Christopher, who had been given a copy by Larry Hama at the DC office in 1978 light-boxed the pages, incorporating a non-linear dialogue, and asked Par Holman to ink it. Holman inked and lettered the piece, and the completed art was distributed through Clay Geerdes' Comics World Co-Op, whose members produced mini- and digest-sized comics. In 2006, writer/artist Joel Johnson bought the Larry Hama paste-up of photocopies at auction and made it available for wide distribution on the Internet. In 2010 Anne Lukeman of Kill Vampire Lincoln Productions produced a short film adapting the "22 Panels That Always Work" into a film noir-style experimental piece called 22 Frames That Always Work. Artist Rafael Kayanan created a revised version of "22 Panels" that used actual art from published Wood comics to illustrate each frame. In 2006, cartoonist and publisher Cheese Hasselberger created "Cheese's 22 Panels That Never Work," featuring bizarre situations and generally poor storytelling techniques. In 2012, Michael Avon Oeming created a Powers-themed update/homage to "22 Panels," making it available for distribution. In July 2012, Cerebus TV producer Max Southall brought together materials and released a documentary that featured Dave Sim's homage to Wallace Wood and a focus on his 22 Panels, including a tribute that features a creation using the motif of one of them, depicting Daredevil and Wood himself, in Wallace Wood style – and the Wallace Wood Estate's official print of the panels.

=== Personal life and final years ===
Wood was married three times. His first marriage was to artist Tatjana Wood, who later did extensive work as a comic-book colorist. Their marriage ended in the late 1960s. His second marriage, to Marilyn Silver, also ended in divorce.

For much of his adult life, Wood had chronic, unexplainable headaches. In the 1970s, following bouts with alcoholism, Wood had kidney failure. A stroke in 1978 caused a loss of vision in one eye. Faced with declining health and career prospects, he shot and killed himself in Los Angeles on November 2, 1981. Toward the end of his life, an embittered Wood would say, according to one biography, "If I had it all to do over again, I'd cut off my hands."

=== Biographies, criticism, collections ===
Wally's World: The Brilliant Life & Tragic Death of Wally Wood, the World's 2nd Best Comic Book Artist by Steve Starger & J. David Spurlock, is a comprehensive biography. It was published in 2006 by Vanguard, which also publishes collections of Wood's comic book work, including Wally Wood: Strange Worlds of Science Fiction, Wally Wood: Eerie Tales of Crime & Horror, Wally Wood: Dare-Devil Aces, Wally Wood: Jungle Adventures, Wally Wood: Torrid Tales of Romance, new editions of The Wizard King books, and the Wally Wood Sketchbook.

In 2017 and 2018, Fantagraphics Books published The Life and Legend of Wallace Wood, a set of two hardcover books (ISBN 978-1-60699-815-1, ISBN 978-1-68396-068-3), mainly compiled by his former assistant Bhob Stewart over a 30-year period. It is a revised, expanded, and uncensored version of his previous Wood book Against the Grain: Mad Artist Wallace Wood (TwoMorrows, 2003). It features personal recollections of Wood's friends, colleagues, and assistants, including John Severin, Al Williamson, Paul Krassner, Trina Robbins, Larry Hama, and Paul Levitz; previously unpublished artwork and photographs; and a detailed examination of his life and career. It was Stewart's last publishing project, but he did not live to see it in print.

== Awards ==
- National Cartoonists Society Comic Book Division awards, 1957, 1959, and 1965.
- Alley Award, Best Pencil Artist, 1965
- Alley Award, Best Inking Work, 1966
- Best Foreign Cartoonist Award, Angoulême International Comics Festival, 1978
- Inkpot Award, 1980
- Jack Kirby Hall of Fame, 1989
- The Will Eisner Award Hall of Fame, 1992
- The Inkwell Awards Joe Sinnott Hall of Fame Award, 2011.

== Bibliography ==
=== DC Comics ===
- All-American Men of War #29–30 (1956)
- All Star Comics #58–59 (inks over Ric Estrada) 60–63 (inks over Keith Giffen); #64–65 (plotter/artist) (1976–1977)
- Amazing World of DC Comics #13 (inks over Steve Ditko) (1976)
- Angel and the Ape #2–4, 6 (inks over Bob Oksner), #5 (inks over Art Saaf) (1969)
- Anthro #6 (inks over Howie Post) (1969)
- Captain Action #1 (artists) #2–3, 5 (inks over Gil Kane) (1968–1969)
- Challengers of the Unknown #2–8 (inks over Jack Kirby) (1958–1959)
- DC 100 Page Super Spectacular #5 (inks over Ric Estrada) (1971)
- DC Special Series #11 (The Flash) (inker) (1978)
- Falling in Love #108 (1969)
- Ghosts #2 (inks over Bob Brown) (1971)
- Girls' Love Stories #143, 150 (1969–1970)
- Green Lantern #69 (inker) (1969)
- Hercules Unbound #1–6 (inks over Jose Luis Garcia-Lopez), 7–8 (inks over Walt Simonson) (1975–1976)
- House of Mystery #180, 184 (inks over Gil Kane), 183, 189 (inks over Jerry Grandenetti); #199, 251 (artist) (1969–1977)
- House of Secrets #91, 96 (1971–1972)
- Isis #1 (inks over Ric Estrada) (1976)
- Limited Collectors' Edition #C-34 (inks over Bob Oksner) (1975)
- Meet Angel #7 (inks over Bob Oksner) (1969)
- Our Army at War #249 (writer/artist) (1972)
- Our Fighting Forces #10 (1956)
- Plop! #14 (artist); #16 (inks over Steve Ditko); #23 (writer/artists) (1975–1976)
- Richard Dragon, Kung-Fu Fighter #4–8 (inks over Ric Estrada) (1975–1976)
- Sandman #4, 6 (inks over Jack Kirby) (1975)
- Showcase #12 (Challengers of the Unknown) (inks over Jack Kirby) (1958)
- Stalker #1–4 (inks over Steve Ditko) (1975)
- Strange Adventures #154 (inks over Gil Kane) (1963)
- Super-Team Family #1, 3 (The Flash and Hawkman team-up) (inker) (1976)
- Superboy #153–155, 157–161 (inks over Bob Brown) (1969)
- Swing with Scooter #30–31, 33 (inks over Art Saaf) (1970–1971)
- Teen Titans #19 (inks over Gil Kane) (1969)
- The Unexpected #122, 137 (inks over Jerry Grandenetti; #138 (artist) (1970–1972)
- Weird Mystery Tales #23 (1975)
- The Witching Hour #15 (1971)
- Wonder Woman #195 (inks over Mike Sekowsky), 269 (inks over Jose Delbo) (1971–1980)
- Young Love #84 (inks over Art Saaf) (1971)

=== EC Comics ===
- Aces High #1–5 (1955)
- Confessions Illustrated #1 (1956)
- The Crypt of Terror #18 (1950)
- Gunfighter #13–14 (inks over Harry Harris) (1950)
- The Haunt of Fear #15–16 (inks over Harry Harris), 4–5, 24 (1950–1954)
- Mad #1–21, 23–86, 90, 143 (1952–1964, 1971)
- Modern Love #5–8 (1950)
- A Moon, a Girl ... Romance #10–12 (1949–1950)
- Piracy #1–2 (1954–1955)
- Saddle Romances #10–11 (1950)
- Shock SuspenStories #2–15 (1952–1954)
- Tales from the Crypt #21, 24–27 (1950–1952)
- Three Dimensional EC Classics #1 (1954)
- Two-Fisted Tales #18–28, 30–35, 41 (1950–1955)
- Valor #1–2, 4–5 (1955)
- Vault of Horror #12–14 (inks over Harry Harris), 39 (1950–1954)
- Weird Fantasy #13–14 (inks over Harry Harris), 15–17, 6–14, 17 (1950–1953)
- Weird Science #12–13, 5–22 (1950–1953)

=== Marvel Comics ===
- Astonishing Tales #1–4 (Doctor Doom) (1970–1971)
- Avengers #20–22 (inks over Don Heck) (1965)
- Captain America #127 (inks over Gene Colan) (1970)
- Cat #1 (inks over Marie Severin) (1972)
- Daredevil #5–10 (1964–1965); #10 (as writer); #11 (inks over Bob Powell) (1965)
- Journey into Mystery #39 (full art); #51 (inks over Jack Kirby) (1956–1959)
- Journey into Unknown Worlds #51 (1956)
- Kull the Conqueror #1 (inks over Ross Andru) (1971)
- Marvel Spotlight #1 (Red Wolf) (inks over Syd Shores) (1971)
- Marvel Tales #152 (1956)
- Mystic #52 (1956)
- Strange Tales #134 (Human Torch and the Thing) (inks over Bob Powell) (1965)
- Tales of Suspense #71 (Iron Man) (inks over Don Heck) (1965)
- Tower of Shadows #5–8 (writer/artist) (1970)
- Unknown Worlds of Science Fiction #1 (writer) (1975)
- Western Gunfighters #22 (1956)

=== Tower Comics ===
- Dynamo #1–4 (1966–1967)
- T.H.U.N.D.E.R. Agents #1–20 (1965–1969)

=== Warren Publishing ===
- 1984 #1–2, 5 (1978–1979)
- Blazing Combat #3–4 (1966)
- Comix International #1 (1975)
- Creepy #38, 41, 55, 75, 78, 91 (1971–1977)
- Eerie #5, 11, 14, 60–61, 131 (1966–1974)
- Famous Monsters of Filmland #58 (1969)
- Galactic Wars Comix #1 (1978)
- Monster World #1 (1964)
- Vampirella #9–10, 12, 19, 27, Annual #1 (1971–1973)
- Warren Presents #1, 3 (1979)

== Gallery ==
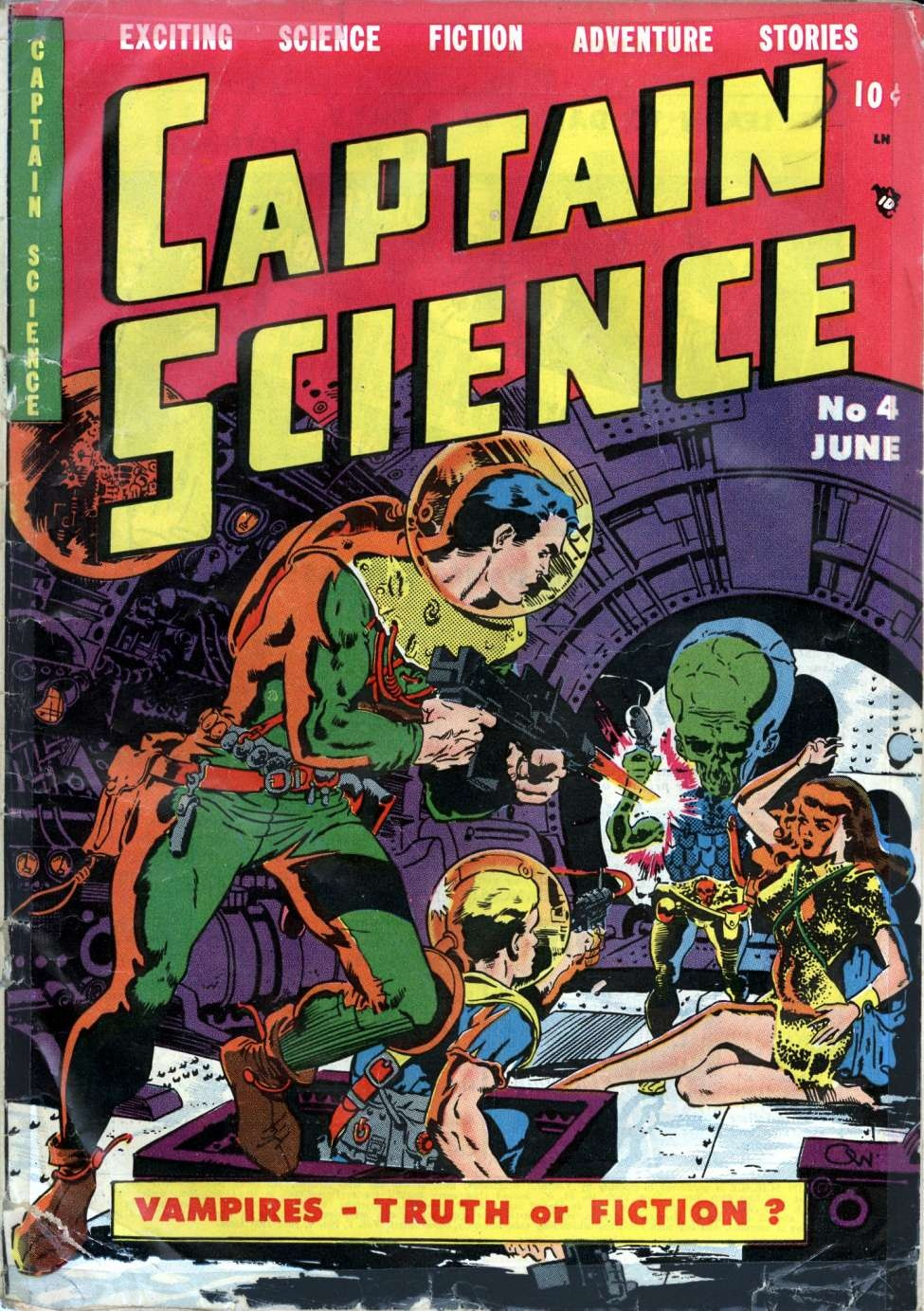
Captain Science #4 (June 1951), Joe Orlando and Wally Wood

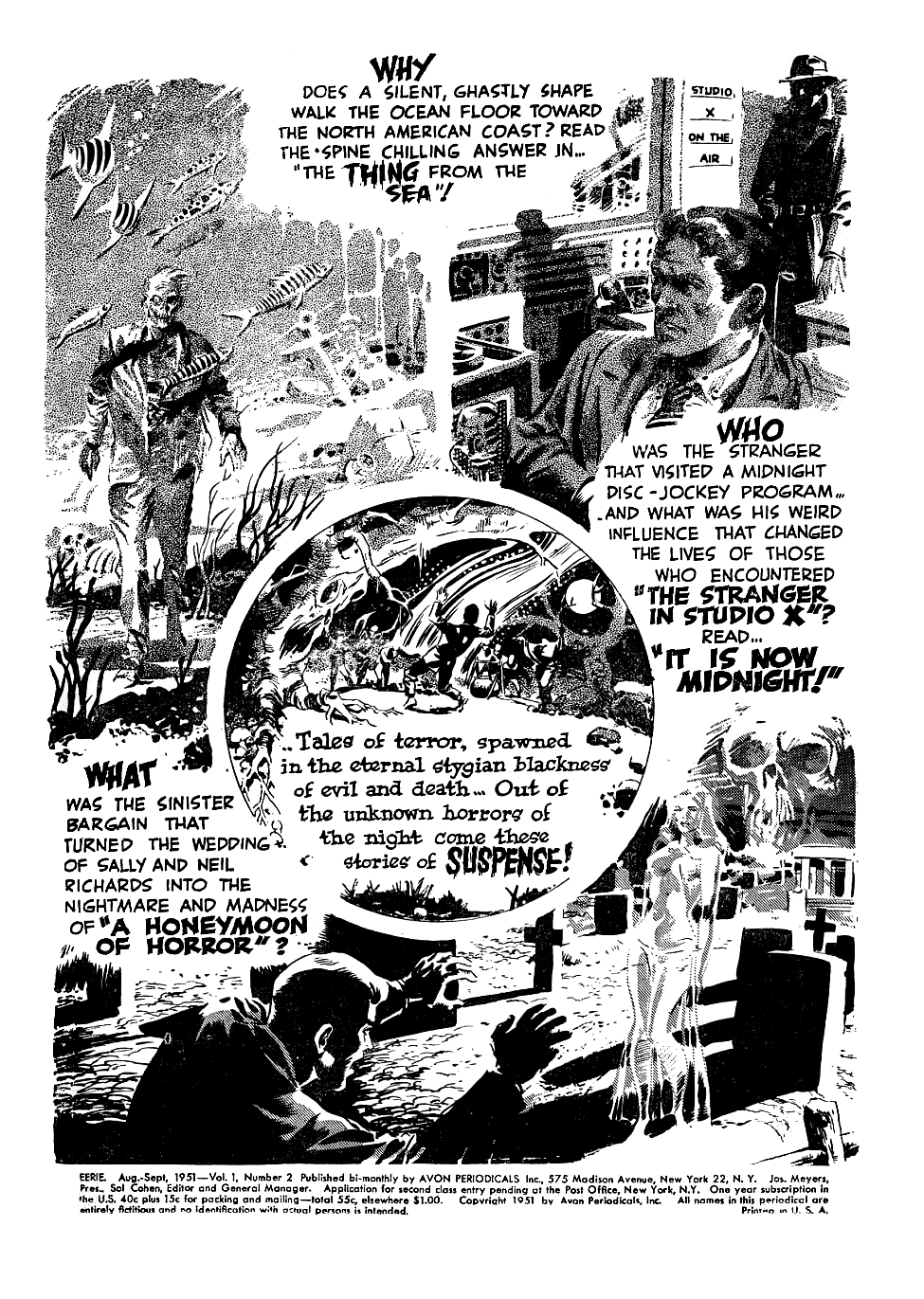
Page from Eerie Comics #2 (August 1951)

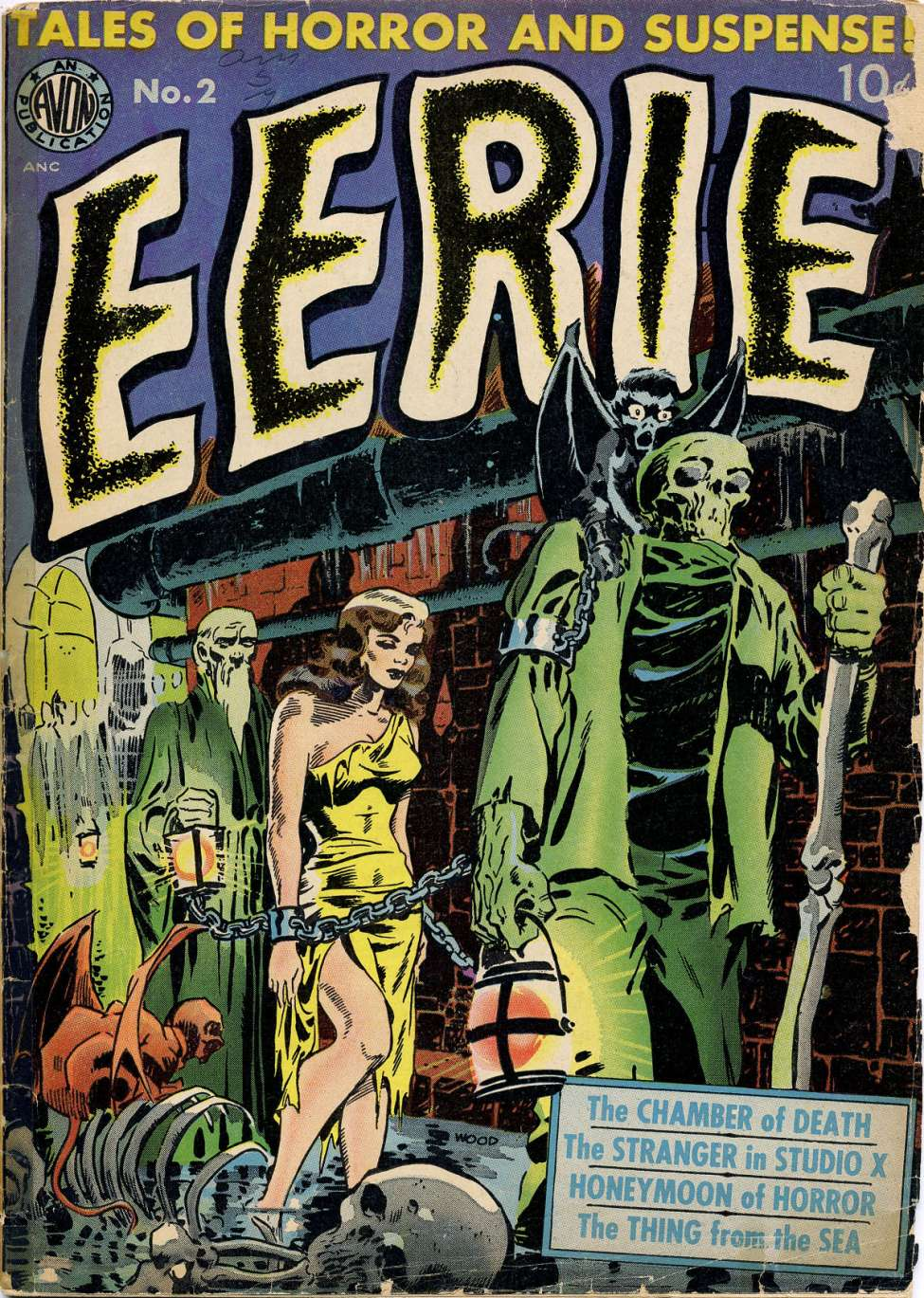
Eerie Comics #2 cover 1951, Avon Comics

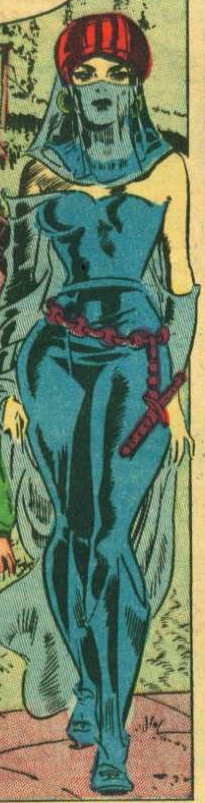
Fah lo Suee in The Mask of Dr. Fu Manchu (1951)

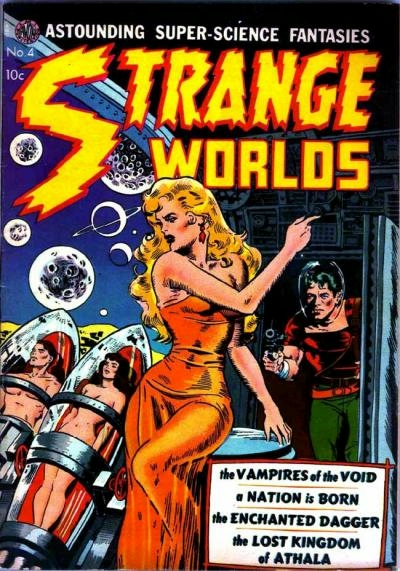
Strange Worlds #4 cover (January 1952), Avon Comics

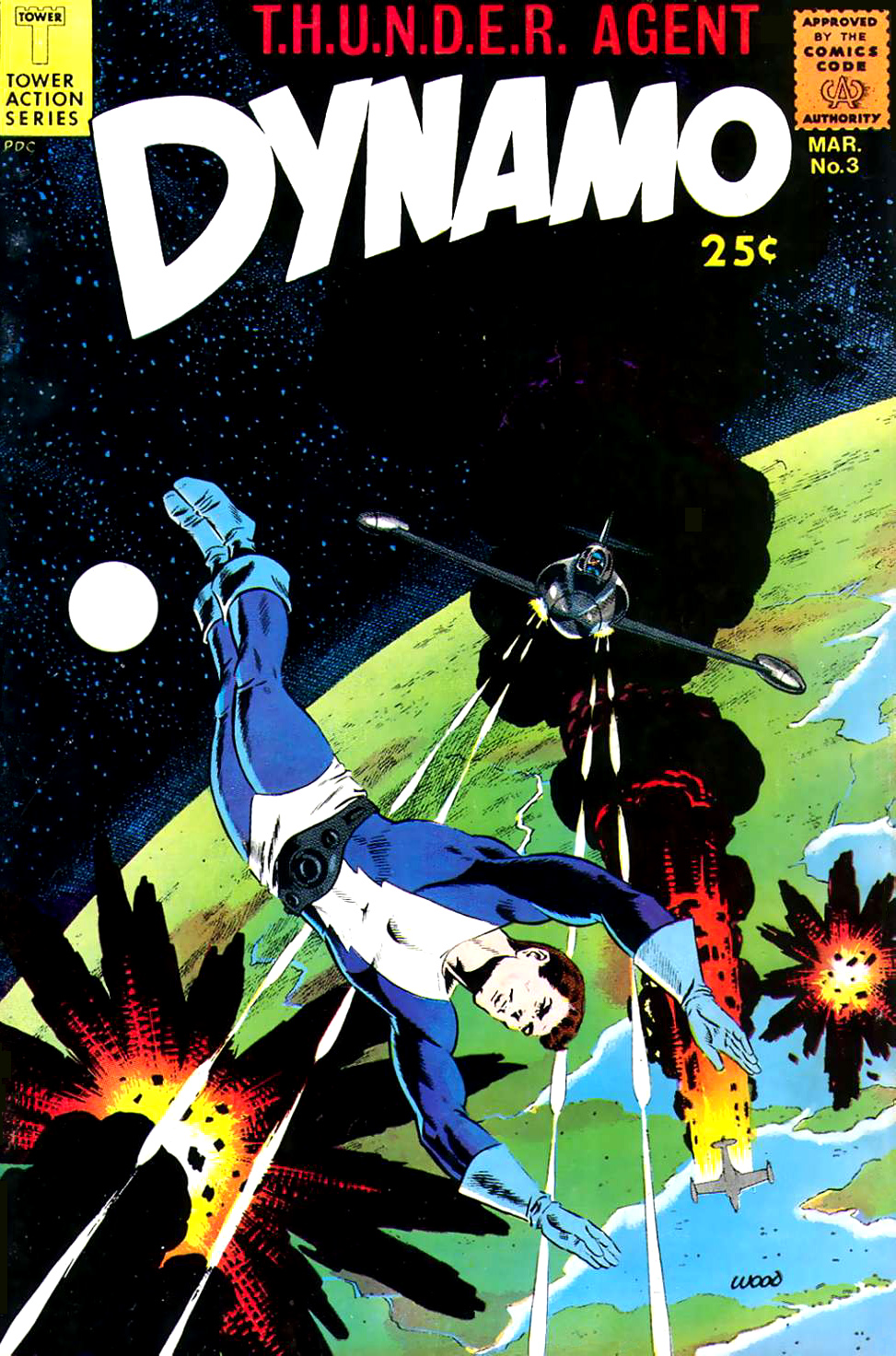
Dynamo #3 (1967), Tower Comics

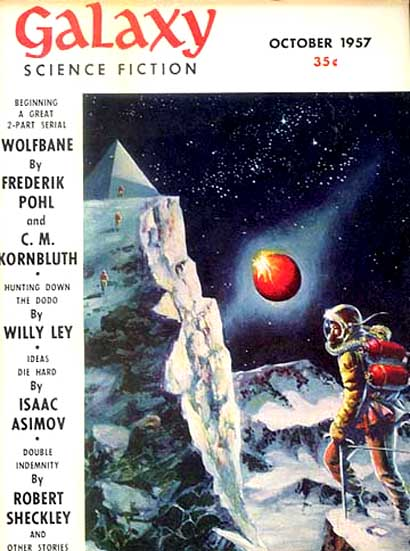
Galaxy Science Fiction cover (October 1957)

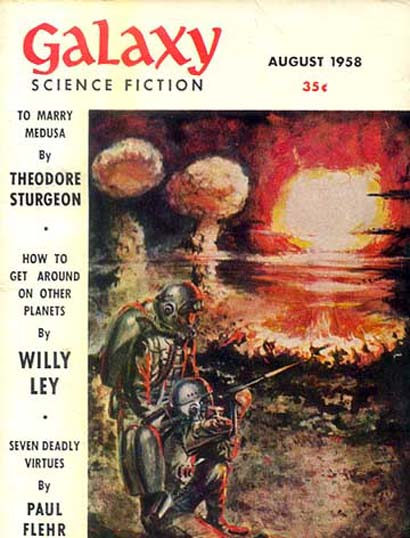
Galaxy Science Fiction cover (August 1958)

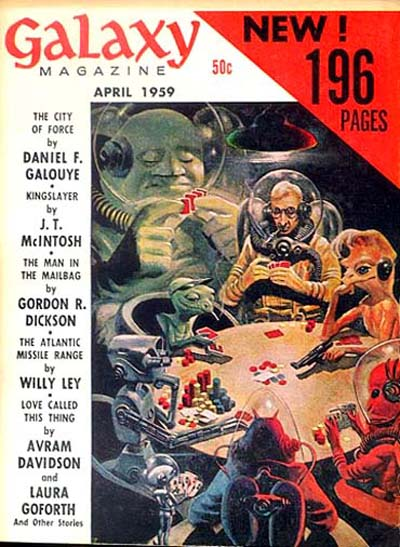
Galaxy Science Fiction cover (April 1959)

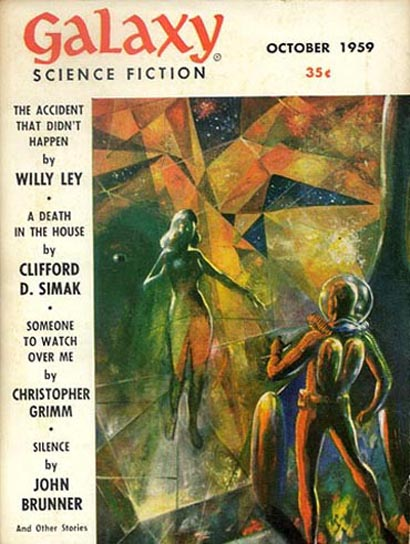
Galaxy Science Fiction cover (October 1959)
