= Ralph Reese =

American artist

- Born: May 19, 1949 (age 77) New York City, US
- Areas: Artist, Inker
- Awards: Shazam Award, 1973, 1974

Ralph Reese (born May 19, 1949) is an American artist who has illustrated for books, magazines, trading cards, comic books and comic strips, including a year drawing the Flash Gordon strip for King Features. Prolific from the 1960s to the 1990s, he is best known for his collaboration with Byron Preiss on the continuing feature "One Year Affair", serialized in the satiric magazine National Lampoon from 1973 to 1975 and then collected into a 1976 book.

Reese early in his career worked in the studio of Wally Wood, assisting on both mainstream and alternative-press comics and on trading cards. He went on to do mainly fantasy and horror illustrations for science-fiction magazines and black-and-white horror-comics magazines. He drew many fantasy, horror and science-fiction stories for Marvel Comics, DC Comics and Valiant Comics.

== Early life ==
Born in New York City, Reese attended New York's High School of Art and Design. He was in the same graduating class as Larry Hama and Frank Brunner.

== Career ==
=== Early career ===
While still an art student in 1966, Reese began his career at age 16 as an assistant to artist Wally Wood, who became a dominant influence on Reese's art.

=== Wally Wood studio ===
Reese contributed to various Wood projects, including Topps trading cards, DC Comics stories and Wood's independent comics. His first confirmed comics work is an illustration for a one-page text story, "...And Thereby Hangs A Tale...", in witzend #1 (Summer 1966). His first comics story was co-penciling and co-inking with Wood a 10-page science-fiction in Heroes, Inc. Presents Cannon (1969). In 2001, Reese recalled his duties at the Wood's studio:

After a while, I got to keeping his files in order. His file was astounding! He must have had 30 file drawers of clippings, and I kept them in order. I also kept the place in order. When I first met Wally he had been working in the same room for 12 years, so there was a lot of clutter. The first time I saw his studio I couldn't figure out what was hanging from the ceiling. There were all these things with grey felt on them. They turned out to be hundreds of model airplanes on strings, covered with dust.

With the Wood Studio as a launching pad, Reese became a prolific freelancer. In 1969, he did a cover and numerous interior illustrations for Galaxy Science Fiction. For Robert Sproul's Major Publications, he was a regular 1969-70 contributor to Web of Horror, edited by Terry Bisson. His first confirmed solo comics story credit is as penciler-inker of Bisson's four-page story "The Skin-Eaters' in Major Publications' Web of Horror #1 (Dec. 1969). He illustrated two Otto Binder stories in Web of Horror #2 (Feb. & April 1970).

=== Comics and commercial illustration ===
During the 1970s, Reese's artwork surfaced in a wide variety of publications, from underground comics to slick magazines, including National Lampoon and Esquire. He sometimes collaborated with Larry Hama. In Comics Interview #37 (1986), Hama recalled working with Reese and Wood:

I guess in 1971 or thereabouts, I was living in Brooklyn and working with Ralph Reese, freelance stuff. I was penciling, and he was inking. We were doing a lot of jobs for National Lampoon. At the time, Woody was moving to Brooklyn, six to eight blocks from where I lived. In the process of helping him move, he said, "Hey, are you interested in a semi-regular job?" I said sure.

Reese worked from 1972 to 1977 at Neal Adams' Continuity Associates studio at 9 East 48th Street in Manhattan. There he became acquainted with a group of freelance artists that included Jack Abel, Sergio Aragones, Dick Giordano, Russ Heath, Bob McLeod, Marshall Rogers, Joe Rubinstein and Lynn Varley. At Continuity, Reese and Hama sometimes worked as a team, and they created illustrations for a variety of clients, including the Children's Television Workshop.

Reese's comic book credits include pages for Acclaim, Byron Preiss, Eclipse Comics, Marvel Comics, Skywald Publications and Warren Publishing. While working in the mainstream, he also contributed to underground titles, including Conspiracy Capers, Drool, and editor Jay Lynch's Kitchen Sink Press comic Bijou Funnies.

His work for DC Comics included stories for House of Mystery, House of Secrets, The Witching Hour and The Unexpected.

In 1973, Reese illustrated Thomas Disch's "The Roaches" for the black-and-white horror-comics magazine Monsters Unleashed, published by Marvel's Curtis Magazines imprint, and the following year, he continued in a similar vein with art for Gerry Conway's story, "The Rats" in Haunt of Horror. With these two stories, featuring extreme close-up drawings of roaches and rats, Reese depicted horror lurking in real-life vermin, and both stories had several reprints.

After he collaborated with Byron Preiss on the feature "One Year Affair" in the National Lampoon, the two did installments of a follow-up, "Two Year Affair". For Atlas/Seaboard Comics he drew "Midnight Muse" in Devilina #1 (January 1975). In 1982, Reese teamed with Al Williamson, Dan Green and Carlos Garzon on a comics adaptation of the movie Blade Runner. In 1985, Reese horror stories were reprinted in the two issues of Reese's Pieces (Eclipse). Also during the 1980s, Reese illustrated more than a dozen titles in Bantam Books' Choose Your Own Adventure series.

In 1989 and 1990, he drew both the daily and Sunday strips of King Features' Flash Gordon, scripted by Bruce Jones. From 1992 to 1997, he did much work for the comic book Magnus Robot Fighter and other Valiant Comics series, including Raj and X-O Manowar. Also in the 1990s, he contributed to several Paradox Press titles: The Big Book of Hoaxes, The Big Book of Freaks, The Big Book of Losers and The Big Book of Little Criminals.

In 2009, Reese returned to DC with "The Thirteenth Hour" in issue #13 (July 2009) of editor Angela Rufino's House of Mystery revival for Vertigo. In 2010, an interview with Reese was reprinted in Pure Imagination's Wild Wood.

== Awards ==
- Shazam Award for Best Inker (Humor Division) in 1973 and 1974.

== Bibliography ==
- One Year Affair (Workman, 1976)
- Nightshade Book One: Terror, Inc. (Pyramid, 1976)
- The Ray Bradbury Chronicles, Volume two (NBM, 1992)
- The Secret Life of Cats (Collier Macmillan, 1982)
- Trouilles Noires (Triton, 1979)
- The Wally Wood Treasury (Pure Imagination, 1980)
- Wild Wood (Pure Imagination, 2010)
