= Richard Bassford =

American illustrator

- Born: 1936 (age 89–90) New York City
- Areas: Illustrator, Artist
- Collaborators: Nick Kenny

Airbrush illustration of F-4D Phantom by Richard Bassford

Richard Bassford (born 1936) is an American illustrator who has worked in both advertising and comic books.

Born in Manhattan, Bassford lived from age three in the Queens neighborhoods of Maspeth, Corona and Whitestone until his marriage in 1961, when he moved to Flushing. In 1975, Bassford settled in Cold Spring, New York.

== Comic books ==
As a teenager, he took particular note of comic books drawn by Wally Wood, who became a major influence. In Manhattan, Bassford studied at the School of Industrial Art (which later became the High School of Art and Design), and he entered the commercial art field in the early 1950s with magazine gag cartoons and packaging art for toy boxes. His pen-and-ink illustrations were published in the magazine Amateur Art & Camera in 1954.

Bassford's first work in comics came in 1957 with "What Happened on the Mountain!" for Atlas Comics' World of Mystery, reprinted in Atlas' World of Fantasy #13 (August 1958). At the Wally Wood Studio, Bassford was an artist on Tower Comics' T.H.U.N.D.E.R. Agents almost from the start. Beginning with the second issue, he assisted Wood on the penciling of "Dynamo Battles Dynavac" (reprinted in Tower's The Terrific Trio paperback). Bassford, Wood and Dan Adkins teamed on The Munsters, a comic book adaptation of the 1964-66 CBS television series. Bassford also worked with Gil Kane on Undersea Agent.

Richard Bassford illustration in Vampirella 11 (May 1971)

An interview with Bassford about Wally Wood in CFA-APA #40 noted the educational aspect of the Wood Studio: "His later black-and-white work using Craftint doubletone board was truly amazing. I learned to use the valuable tones available with Zip-A-Tone Benday shading sheets simply by studying Woody's application."

After James Warren recruited Bassford for Warren Publishing in the early 1970s, beginning with an illustration in Vampirella #11 (May, 1971), he contributed to both Creepy and Eerie. For Creepy #39 he drew "The Dragon Prow" from a Steve Skeates script, and in issue #41, he executed "The Hangman of London" for "Creepy's Loathsome Lore." For Eerie #39, he illustrated Doug Moench's "The Mysterious Men in Black!" for "Eerie's Monster Gallery."

His work as an illustrator spans a wide range of subjects from science fiction and fantasy interiors to color cartoons and the poems of Nick Kenny. His airbrushed informational-card illustrations for International Masters Publishers have covered military aircraft; mermaids and creatures for IMP's Myths and Monsters series; and Sports Heroes, Feats & Facts.

Bassford's drawings have appeared in a variety of publications, including Screw and Bill Pearson's Sata. For the magazine Fantastic he illustrated two stories: "The Forest of Unreason" by Robert F. Young (July 1961) and The Trekkers by Daniel F. Galouye (September 1961).

== Ad art ==
The client list for Bassford's advertising art includes Disney, General Electric, IBM, Nestle, People's Bank and Waldenbooks. Over decades, he continued to do cartoons and illustrations for corporate audio-visual advertising art presentations, such as a slide show of 79 cartoons for GE Lighting and 36 cartoons for a People's Bank promotion. He returned to comics in 1986 when he teamed with Pearson on the story "Daddy's Little Girl" for Lurid Tales, published by Eros Comix, an imprint of Fantagraphics Books.

== Books ==
For Hope Farm Press, Bassford illustrated Crisis in the Lower Hudson (1995), about Benedict Arnold’s attempt to sell West Point to the British during the American Revolution, the capture of British Major John André and his execution in Tappan, New York. In 2003, he was a contributor of both text and art to Bhob Stewart's Against the Grain: Mad Artist Wallace Wood, and his T.H.U.N.D.E.R. Agents pages were reprinted in the hardback T.H.U.N.D.E.R. Agents Archive series (2003–05), published by DC Comics. In 2006, he provided illustrations for Bill Pearson's novel, Drifter's Detour.

== See also ==
- Nick Kenny

== Sources consulted ==
- Richard Bassford at the Comic Book DB (archived from the original)
