= Mr. A =

Fictional character

- Mr. A, in a panel from witzend #4, 1968. Art by Steve Ditko.

Publication information
- First appearance: witzend #3 (1967)
- Created by: Steve Ditko

In-story information
- Alter ego: Rex Graine
- Abilities: Wears armored gloves and full-head armored mask for protection Proficient at hand to hand combat

Mr. A is a fictional comic book hero created by Steve Ditko. Unlike most of Ditko's work, the character of Mr. A remained the property of Ditko, who wrote and illustrated the stories in which the character appeared entirely himself. The character first appeared in Wally Wood's witzend #3 (1967).

Mr. A was inspired by Objectivism, the philosophical system and ethical egoism of the philosopher-novelist Ayn Rand. Ditko has been quoted as saying that his creation The Question was intended as a version of Mr. A that would be acceptable to the Comics Code Authority that censored mainstream comics during the era. Ditko explained: "Where other ‘heroes’ powers are based on some accidental super-element, The Question and Mr. A’s ‘power’ is deliberately knowing what is right and acting accordingly", and "Where other heroes choose to be selfmade neurotics, The Question and Mr. A choose to be psychologically and intellectually healthy."

== Fictional character biography ==
Rex Graine is a newspaper reporter for the Daily Crusader. He is known for his uncompromising principles and incorruptibility. In order to fight crime, Graine wears metal gloves and a steel mask that resembles a placid face, thus becoming Mr. A. In keeping with the hardboiled detective theme, both personae typically wear suits and fedora hats; Mr. A's outfit is completely white. There is no origin story for the character, thus the only discernible reason why Graine sometimes disguises himself (both his identities are equally threatened by criminals and sometimes hated by the general public) is due to his choice to become a vigilante. Mr. A uses half white-half black calling cards to signify his arrival, as well as to represent his belief that there can only be good and evil, and no moral grey area.

== Influence ==
Comics creator Alan Moore was once a member of the band "The Emperors of Ice Cream", who performed a Moore-penned song entitled "Mr. A." (to the tune of The Velvet Underground's song "Sister Ray") parodying Steve Ditko's political ideology. Moore later created the character Rorschach for the series Watchmen, which was based on both The Question and Mr. A. Moore related a story about an unspecified acquaintance who said he asked Ditko about whether he was familiar with Rorschach. Reportedly, Ditko acknowledged Rorschach as being "like Mr. A, except...insane".

== Publication history ==
- "Mr. A." (5 pages) (witzend #3, 1967)
- "Mr. A." (10 pages) (witzend #4, 1968)
- Eon #3 zine by Gustaveson (1968/9) back cover Mr. A by Steve Ditko
- "Middle of the Road?" (5 pages) (Graphic Illusions #1, 1971) (Considered Eon #4)
  - Also 2 color back cover of Graphic Illusions #1 Mr. A. by Steve Ditko (Summer 1971)
    See also Guts, the Magazine with Intestinal Fortitude.
  - Above reprinted in The Ditko Collection #1, by Fantagraphics without permission 2/85
- "When Is a Man to Be Judged Evil?" (6 pages) (The Collector #26, Sum/72)
- wrap-around cover to The Collector #26, Sum/72
- "What Happens to a Man When He Refuses to Uphold the Good" (8 pages) (Comic Crusader #6, Sum/69 and #7, Fal/69)
- "Mr. A.: Chapterplay" (8 pages) (Comic Crusader #13, 1972)
- "Right to Kill" (9 pages)
  - Above published as Mr. A. #1 by Comic Art Publishers, 1973
  - Above reprinted in The Ditko Collection #1, by Fantagraphics 2/85
- "Count Rogue" (16 pages)
- "Brotherhood of the Collective" (16 pages)
  - Above published in Mr. A. #2 by Bruce Hershenson, 1975 (labelled "D.4" on the cover, other 2 were the Ditko comics Avenging World and Wha!?! published by Hershenson)
- "Death vs. Love-Song" (10 pages) (Comic Crusader Storybook, 1978)
  - Above reprinted in The Ditko Collection #2, by Fantagraphics, 8/86

Bruce Hershenson promoted "Mr. A. vs. the Polluters" on the backcover of #2, but it never appeared. A new series was advertised by Mort Todd's AAA around 1991 but never published. Further, only a few images have been seen publicly, in addition to a sticker set and a T-shirt.

- "Mr. A. Faces The Knifer" (30 pages). (Steve Ditko's 176-Page, Heroes Package, Robin Snyder & Steve Ditko, 2000)
- "Mr. A." (8 pages) (Ditko Continued, Robin Snyder & Steve Ditko, 2009 and Oh, No! Not Again, Ditko!, Robin Snyder & Steve Ditko, 2009)

A new edition of the 1973 Mr. A. #1 comic was published by Snyder and Ditko in late 2009 (dated January 2010). This edition has all the story contents of the original, though with a different story order, the covers and centerfold printed in black and white and the splash page to "Right to Kill!" restored to Ditko's original intent.

- "The Best Deal" (20 pages)
- "Exploder" (11 pages)
  - Above published in Mr. A. #15 Robin Snyder & Steve Ditko, 2014
- "Mr. A. and the Horror" (11 pages)
- "The Score" (20 pages)
  - Above published in Mr. A. #18 Robin Snyder & Steve Ditko, 2016

In addition, Ditko drew numerous single-page Mr. A images for fanzines in the 1960s and 1970s.

== Bibliography ==
- Mr. A, part 1, Dial B For Blog #296
- Mr. A, part 2, Dial B For Blog #297
- Mr. A, part 3, Dial B For Blog #298
- Mr. A at Comic Book DB
- Steve Ditko's Mr. A at VicSage.com
