= Roger Stern =

American comic book author

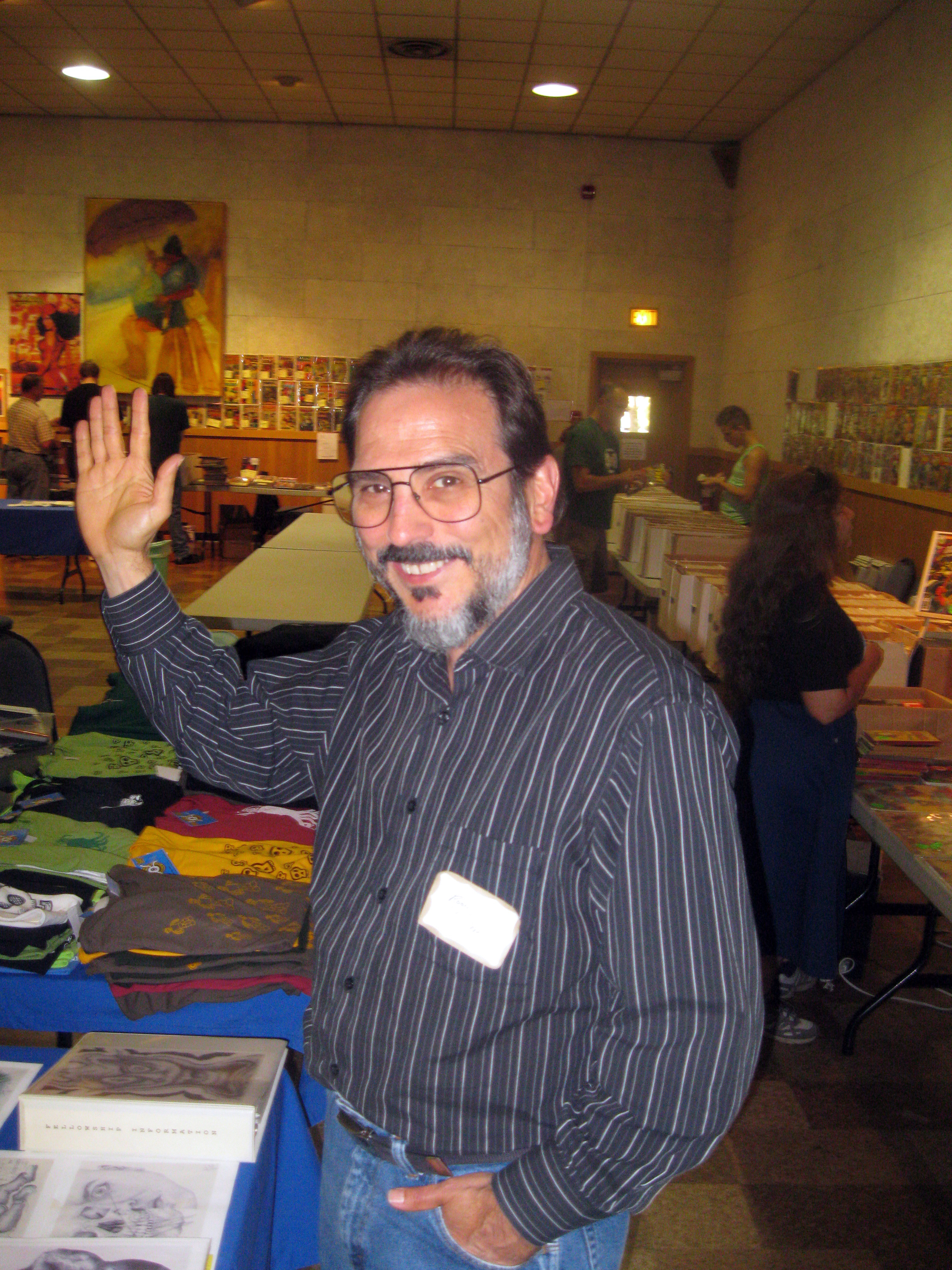
- Stern photographed at Ithacon 35, Part II in 2010
- Born: September 17, 1950 (age 76) Noblesville, Indiana, U.S.
- Area: Writer
- Notable works: Action Comics; The Amazing Spider-Man; The Avengers; Captain America; Doctor Strange; Power of the Atom; Starman; Triumph and Torment

Roger Stern (born September 17, 1950) is an American comic book author and novelist. He is best known for his work on The Amazing Spider-Man, The Avengers, Captain America, and Doctor Strange for Marvel Comics and for his work on Superman for DC Comics including "The Death of Superman" storyline.

Among the comic characters Stern co-created are Nebula, Monica Rambeau, Doomsday, Hobgoblin and Maxima. He also created the Westcoast Avengers team.

== Biography ==
=== Early career ===
In the early 1970s, Stern and Bob Layton published the fanzine CPL (Contemporary Pictorial Literature), one of the first platforms for the work of John Byrne. CPL rapidly became a popular fan publication, and led to the two forming an alliance with Charlton Comics to produce and publish "the now-famous Charlton Bullseye magazine". During the mid-1970s, both Marvel and DC were publishing in-house "fan" publications (FOOM and The Amazing World of DC Comics respectively), and Charlton wished to make inroads into the superhero market, as well as "establish a fan presence," leading to the alliance with CPL to produce the Charlton Bullseye. This led to Charlton giving Layton and Stern "access to unpublished material from their vaults by the likes of Steve Ditko, Jeff Jones and a host of others."

=== Comics ===
The Hobgoblin character co-created by Stern. Art by John Romita Jr.

Stern broke into the industry as a writer in 1975 as part of the Marvel Comics "third wave" of creators, which included artists John Byrne and Frank Miller, and writers Jo Duffy, Mark Gruenwald and Ralph Macchio. Stern worked as an editor from 1976 to 1980. Jim Shooter claims that Stern co-plotted (as a ghostwriter) his last few stories for DC Comics in 1976. Stern wrote the "Guardians of the Galaxy" feature in Marvel Presents #10-12 in 1977. He briefly collaborated with Byrne on Captain America. The two produced a story wherein Captain America considered running for the office of President of the United States, an idea originally developed by Roger McKenzie and Don Perlin. Stern, in his capacity as editor of the title, had originally rejected the idea but later changed his mind about the concept. McKenzie and Perlin received credit for the idea on the letters page at Stern's insistence. His first regular monthly book was as staff writer for The Incredible Hulk taking over for departing Len Wein in 1978. Stern later became the writer of The Spectacular Spider-Man with issue #43 (June 1980). He then took over The Amazing Spider-Man with issue #224 (January 1982). In addition to his Spider-Man work, Stern is known for his lengthy stints on Doctor Strange, and The Avengers. In 1982, he co-created Marvel's second Captain Marvel and the Hobgoblin, both with artist John Romita Jr. Stern wrote "The Kid Who Collects Spider-Man" in The Amazing Spider-Man #248 (January 1984), a story which ranks among his most popular. Stern ended his run with Amazing Spider-Man #252 (May 1984), chiefly due to his difficulty working with new Spider-Man editor Danny Fingeroth. Later that same year, he co-created the Avengers spin-off The West Coast Avengers, with artist Bob Hall.

In 1987, after a dispute with editor Mark Gruenwald over upcoming storylines, Stern was fired from The Avengers. He began freelancing for DC Comics, where he was one of the core Superman writers for almost a decade, working on Superman (vol. 2), Action Comics, and Superman: The Man of Tomorrow. He contributed to such storylines as "Panic in the Sky" and "The Death of Superman" which revived interest in the character in the early 1990s. He created the Eradicator in Action Comics Annual #2 and later incorporated the character into the "Reign of the Supermen" story arc beginning in The Adventures of Superman #500. Stern wrote the 1991 story wherein Clark Kent finally revealed his identity as Superman to Lois Lane. In Summer 1995, Stern and artist Tom Grummett created a new quarterly series, Superman: The Man of Tomorrow. Additionally, Stern was one of the many creators who worked on the Superman: The Wedding Album one-shot in 1996 which featured the title character's marriage to Lois Lane. Besides his work on Superman, Stern (with co-plotter Tom McCraw) wrote Legionnaires from 1996 to 1999. Other work for DC included a relaunched Atom series, drawn by Dwayne Turner and the co-creation of the Will Payton version of Starman with artist Tom Lyle.

In 1996, Stern returned to Marvel to write the miniseries Spider-Man: Hobgoblin Lives, and contributed to three issues of Spectacular Spider-Man in 1998 which featured the first confrontation between Norman Osborn and Roderick Kingsley. Over the next four years, he wrote the short-lived Marvel Universe series, as well as such miniseries as Avengers Two, Avengers Infinity, and Spider-Man: Revenge of the Green Goblin. Stern collaborated with Avengers writer Kurt Busiek on Iron Man and the miniseries Avengers Forever, and with John Byrne on Marvel: The Lost Generation.

After a major editorial shuffle at Marvel in 2000 left him without assignments, Stern began writing for European publisher Egmont, for whom he produced scripts for Fantomen (The Phantom), and Panini UK, for whose Marvel Rampage magazine he wrote Spider-Man and Hulk stories. Stern and Busiek co-wrote the Darkman vs. Army of Darkness limited series which was drawn by artist James Fry and published by Dynamite Entertainment. In 2007, Stern wrote an issue of The All-New Atom and reunited with Byrne to produce a five-issue story arc for JLA Classified for DC in 2008.

The next year, Stern returned to Marvel, where he wrote new stories for Giant-Size Incredible Hulk, The Amazing Spider-Man, Young Allies 70th Anniversary Special, Amazing Spider-Man Family, Web of Spider-Man (vol. 2), Captain America and The Many Loves of the Amazing Spider-Man. He collaborated again with Busiek, co-writing several issues of Marvels: Eye of the Camera, the sequel to the Marvels miniseries. Stern has continued to freelance for Marvel, writing the 2010 miniseries Captain America: Forever Allies and Captain America Corps, another miniseries, in 2011. In 2012, he worked on an issue of the limited series Hulk Smash Avengers with artist Karl Moline, and wrote issue #156.1 of Peter Parker: Spider-Man vol. 2. In 2015, he contributed a story to Spider-Verse Team-Up #1.

As part of Marvel Comics' 80th Anniversary the one-shot Avengers: Loki Unleashed! by Roger Stern and artist Ron Lim that takes place after Stern's famous "The Siege" storyline, has been published in September 2019.

For the Binge Books label of publisher Sitcomics, Stern wrote the 68-page comic book Heroes Union #1 (August 2021), pencilled by Ron Frenz and inked by Sal Buscema. That same year, Stern contributed a two-page story titled "A Climate of Hope" to Rewriting Extinction for The Most Important Comic Book on Earth: Stories to Save the World, an anthology about the climate and the biodiversity crisis.

In 2023, Stern contributed a story to The Death of Superman 30th Anniversary Special #1, drawn by Butch Guice. He also wrote a five-page story for the anniversary issue Doctor Strange #450, published in 2025.

=== Graphic novels ===
Stern has also written a number of graphic novels, including Doctor Strange & Doctor Doom: Triumph and Torment; Superman for Earth; The Incredible Hulk vs. Superman; Superman: A Nation Divided; and Untold Tales of Spider-Man: Strange Encounters.

=== Prose ===
In addition to his comics work, Stern has written three novels: The Death and Life of Superman (Bantam Books, 1993), Smallville: Strange Visitors (Warner Books, 2002), and Superman: The Never-Ending Battle (Pocket Books, 2005). The Death and Life of Superman was a New York Times bestseller in hardcover and was released as a mass market paperback in 1994; a new trade paperback edition was released by Barnes & Noble in 2004.

=== Personal life ===
Stern married Cornell University chemistry professor Carmela Merlo in Ithaca, New York, on June 19, 1982, at a ceremony attended by many Marvel staffers, including editor-in-chief Jim Shooter.

== Bibliography ==
=== DC Comics ===
- 9-11 – The World's Finest Comic Book Writers & Artists Tell Stories to Remember Volume 2 (2002)
- Action Comics #601–642, 644–657, 659–665, 667–693, 696–700, 737, Annual #2–3 (1988–1994)
- The Adventures of Superman #453–454, 457 (with George Perez), 462, 500 (1989–1993)
- The All-New Atom #16 (2007)
- The Death of Superman 30th Anniversary Special #1 (2023)
- Doomsday Annual #1 (1995)
- Green Lantern Corps Quarterly #1–4 (1992–1993)
- JLA Classified #50–54 (2008)
- Legion of Super-Heroes vol. 4 #91, 100, 105 (1998)
- Legionnaires #35–53, 55–74, 76–77, Annual #3 (1996–1999)
- Newstime #1 (1993)
- Power of the Atom #1–11, 14–15 (1988–1989)
- Secret Origins vol. 2 #29 (1988)
- Showcase '95 #4–5 (1995)
- Starman #1–28 (1988–1990)
- Supergirl vol. 3 #1–4 (1994)
- Supergirl and Team Luthor Special #1 (1993)
- Superman vol. 2 #23–28, 30–34. Annual #2, 7 (1988–1995)
- Superman: A Nation Divided #1 (1999)
- Superman: For Earth #1 (1991)
- Superman Secret Files #1 (1998)
- Superman: The Legacy of Superman #1 (1993)
- Superman: The Man of Steel #1, 57 (1991–1996)
- Superman: The Man of Tomorrow #1–10 (1995–1998)
- Superman: The Sunday Classics 1939–1943 (introduction) (2006)
- Superman: The Wedding Album #1 (1996)
- Superman Villains Secret Files #1 (1999)
- Underworld Unleashed: Patterns of Fear #1 (1995)
- Who's Who in the DC Universe #3–7, 10–14, 16 (1990–1992)
- Who's Who in the DC Universe Update 1993 #1–2 (1992–1993)

=== DC Comics / Marvel Comics ===
- The Incredible Hulk vs. Superman #1 (1999)
- Spider-Boy Team-Up #1 (1997)

=== Marvel Comics ===
- The Amazing Spider-Man #206, 224–227, 229–252, 580, 627–629, Annual #15–17, 22, Annual '97 (1980–1988, 1997, 2009–2010)
- Amazing Spider-Man Family #7 (2009)
- The Avengers #189–190, 201, 227–279, 281–287, Annual #13–14 (1979–1988)
- Avengers 1½ (1999)
- Avengers Forever #3–12 (1998–1999)
- Avengers Infinity #1–4 (2000)
- Avengers: Loki Unleashed! #1 (2019)
- Avengers: The Ultron Imperative #1 (2001)
- Avengers Two: Wonder Man and Beast #1–3 (2000)
- Captain America #230, 247–255, 600 (1979–1981, 2009)
- Captain America Corps #1–5 (2011)
- Captain America: Forever Allies #1–4 (2010–2011)
- Captain America: Sentinel of Liberty #6–7 (1999)
- Crazy Magazine #63, 65 (incorrectly marked as #66 on cover) (1980)
- Doctor Strange vol. 2 #27–30, 32–33, 35–37, 47–62, 65–73, 75 (1978–1986)
- Doctor Strange/Doctor Doom: Triumph and Torment (1989)
- Doctor Strange: From the Marvel Vault (2011)
- Doctor Strange #450 (oneshot) (2025)
- Epic Illustrated #20 (1983)
- Fantastic Four #183, 294–295, 297–302 (1977, 1986–1987)
- FOOM #7, 14, 21–22 (1974–1978)
- Ghost Rider vol. 2 #68–70, 72–73 (1982)
- Giant-Size Incredible Hulk #1 (2008)
- Heroes for Hire #1 (1996)
- The Hulk #23 (1980)
- Hulk Smash Avengers #3 (2012)
- The Incredible Hulk vol. 2 #218–221, 223–229, 231–243, Annual #7–8 (1978–1980)
- Iron Man #129, Annual #4 (1977–1979)
- Iron Man vol. 3 #14–25 (1999–2000)
- Iron Man/Captain America Annual '98 (1998)
- The Many Loves of the Amazing Spider-Man #1 (2010)
- Marvel Age #3, 33, Annual #3–4 (1983–1988)
- Marvel Comics #1001 (among others) (2019)
- Marvel Fanfare #6, 12, 18, 57 (1983–1985, 1991)
- Marvel No-Prize Book #1 (research) (1983)
- Marvel Premiere #50 (1979)
- Marvel Presents #8, 10–12 (1977)
- Marvel Preview #20–21, 23 (1980)
- Marvel Super-Heroes #103–104 (1981)
- Marvel Team-Up Annual #3 (1980)
- Marvel: The Lost Generation #1–12 (12–1) (2000–2001)
- Marvel Treasury Edition #13 (1977)
- Marvel Universe #1–7 (1998)
- Marvels: Eye of the Camera #3–6 (2009–2010)
- Official Handbook of the Marvel Universe #5 (1983)
- Omega the Unknown #8 (1977)
- Peter Parker: Spider-Man vol. 2 #156.1 (2012)
- Power Pachyderms #1 (1989)
- Shadows and Light vol. 2 #3 (1998)
- Solo Avengers #2–4 (1988)
- The Spectacular Spider-Man #43, 45–52, 54–61, 85, 259–261, Annual #3 (1980–1981, 1998)
- Speedball #1–8 (1988–1989)
- Spider-Man: Dead Man's Hand #1 (1997)
- Spider-Man: Hobgoblin Lives #1–3 (1997)
- Spider-Man: Revenge of the Green Goblin #1–3 (2000)
- Spider-Man Team-Up #2 (1996)
- Spider-Verse Team-Up #1 (2015)
- Thor #394, Annual #6 (1977–1988)
- Thunderbolts #7–9 (1997)
- Untold Tales of Spider-Man #–1, 25 (1997)
- Untold Tales of Spider-Man: Strange Encounter (1997)
- Web of Spider-Man Annual #3 (1987)
- Web of Spider-Man vol. 2 #12 (2010)
- West Coast Avengers mini-series #1–4 (1984)
- What If? #31, 34–35 (1982)
- X-Men: Odd Men Out #1 (2008)
- X-Men vs. The Avengers #1–3 (1987)
- Young Allies 70th Anniversary Special #1 (2009)

=== Panini UK ===
- Marvel Rampage #8–10, 12–14 (2005)

=== Other publishers ===
- Charlton Bullseye #1–2, 4–5 (1975–1976)
- Dark Man vs. Army of Darkness #1–4 (2006–2007)
- The Complete Rog 2000 (1982)
- Contemporary Pictorial Literature #9/10 (double issue), 11–12 (1974–1975)
- Don Rosa's Comics and Stories #1 (introduction) (1983)
- Fantaco Chronicles #5 (1982)
- Fantomen (Egmont) #13/2004 (#1334)
- Heroes, Inc. #2 (1976)
- Heroes Union #1 (2021)
- Images of Omaha #2 (1992)
- Magnus Robot Fighter #15–17 (1992)
- Monster in My Pocket #1 (plot) (1991)
- The Most Important Comic Book on Earth: Stories to Save the World (2021)
- Prince Valiant Vol.14: 1963–1964 (introduction) (2016)
- Star Hawks comic strip (writing assistance) (1980)
- Stray Bullets #2 (text piece) (1995)
- The Spirit #30 (1981)
- Superman & Batman Magazine #3, 8 (1994–1995)
- The Uncanny Dave Cockrum... A Tribute (2004)
- Writer's Block 2003

| Preceded by Len Wein | The Incredible Hulk writer 1978–1980 | Succeeded by Steven Grant |
| Preceded by Roger McKenzie | Captain America writer 1980–1981 (with John Byrne in early 1980) | Succeeded by J. M. DeMatteis |
| Preceded by Dennis O'Neil | The Amazing Spider-Man writer 1982–1984 | Succeeded by Tom DeFalco |
| Preceded by Steven Grant | The Avengers writer 1983–1987 | Succeeded by Ralph Macchio |
| Preceded by John Byrne | Fantastic Four writer 1986–1987 | Succeeded by Steve Englehart |
| Preceded by John Byrne | Superman writer 1988–1989 | Succeeded by Jerry Ordway |
| Preceded by John Byrne | Action Comics writer 1988–1994 | Succeeded by David Michelinie |
| Preceded by Tom McCraw and Tom Peyer | Legionnaires writer 1996–1999; With: Tom McCraw | Succeeded by Dan Abnett and Andy Lanning |
| Preceded by Kurt Busiek | Iron Man writer 1998–2000 (with Kurt Busiek) | Succeeded by Joe Quesada |
