= Roger Slifer =

American comic book writer, screenwriter, and television producer (1954–2015)

- Roger Slifer
- Born: Roger Allen Slifer; November 11, 1954 Shelbyville, Indiana, U.S.
- Died: March 30, 2015 (aged 60) Greensburg, Indiana, U.S.
- Areas: Writer, Editor, Letterer, Colourist
- Notable works: Lobo; Omega Men

Roger Allen Slifer (/ˈslaɪfər/; November 11, 1954 – March 30, 2015) was an American comic book writer, screenwriter, and television producer who co-created the character Lobo for DC Comics. Among the many comic-book series for which he wrote was DC's Omega Men for a run in the 1980s.

Slifer was the victim of a hit-and-run collision in 2012 that left him in institutional care until his death.

== Biography ==
Slifer was born on November 11, 1954. He had a sister, Connie.

Slifer spent most of his childhood in Morristown, Indiana.

=== Comics ===
Slifer started out in comics as a member of the so-called CPL Gang, a group of amateur comics enthusiasts based in Indianapolis, many of whom later went on to careers in the comics industry.

By the mid-1970s, Slifer was working as a freelance writer for Marvel Comics. Thanks to Marvel staffers (and former CPL Gang members) Duffy Vohland and Jenny Isabella, in the late 1970s Slifer was hired as an assistant editor at Marvel, where he wrote for a number of comic-book series including The Defenders. He also became a colorist. Eventually, Slifer became a special projects editor at Marvel, overseeing comics magazines published by Marvel's parent company such as The Rampaging Hulk. During this time, Slifer worked on the Marvel Classics Comics line, in addition to film adaptations.

In 1979, Slifer (with the financial assistance of David Anthony Kraft), under the publishing imprint Excalibur Enterprises, published Collector's Classics #1: Manhunter: The Complete Saga, which reprinted the Archie Goodwin/Walt Simonson run of Manhunter backup stories from DC Comics' Detective Comics #437–443.

Slifer moved to DC Comics in February 1981, ostensibly as the company's first sales manager to comic book specialty stores. He continued writing sporadically, most notably on Omega Men, where he co-created the extraterrestrial alien mercenary anti-hero Lobo with artist Keith Giffen. Slifer served as an editor at DC from 1984 to 1985 and oversaw the Green Lantern/Green Arrow reprint series, New Talent Showcase, and World's Finest Comics. Slifer left DC after clashing with the company about its stance regarding creators' rights. Slifer had been involved in the creators' rights issue since the late 1970s.

=== Animation ===
After leaving DC, Slifer found work with Sunbow Entertainment, an animation production company with ties to Marvel Comics and Marvel Productions. Slifer eventually became a supervising producer, story editor, and writer for the animated television program Jem and the Holograms. He produced and was story editor on other animated series including G.I. Joe Extreme, My Little Pony 'n Friends, Transformers, Street Fighter, Conan the Adventurer, and Bucky O'Hare. During his time at Sunbow, Slifer's colleagues included former Marvel Comics writers Steve Gerber and Marv Wolfman.

Slifer co-produced the first season of Yu-Gi-Oh! for 4Kids Entertainment in the United States.

=== Video games ===
Slifer worked as a writer and consultant in the video games industry.

== Personal life ==
Prior to 2012, Slifer lived in Santa Monica, California.

=== Hit-and-run crash ===
Early on June 23, 2012, Slifer was hit by a motorist while walking in Santa Monica, California, after spending the evening with friends. The driver fled the scene. Slifer was seriously injured, suffering breaks to some ribs, his collar bone, and his shoulder. Most critically, due to head injuries, doctors had to remove a portion of Slifer's skull and place him in an induced coma at the Ronald Reagan UCLA Medical Center.

S.L.I.F.E.R., the Society for Legal, Investigative and Financial Empowerment and Recovery, was created in July 2012 to assist in bringing the hit-and-run driver to justice and providing updates on Slifer's condition. The nonprofit assistance organization The Hero Initiative helped raise money to assist in Slifer's legal case and medical care.

Slifer's sister Connie Carlton took over his care, and in late July 2012, Slifer was moved from UCLA's Ronald Reagan Neuroscience/Trauma Intensive Care Unit to Barlow Respiratory Hospital in Los Angeles. At that point, he was still comatose. Slifer's condition improved at Barlow, and he emerged from his coma. In late September 2012, he was transferred to the sub-acute care facility Goldstar Rehabilitation Services, in Santa Monica.

As of late February 2013, Slifer was awaiting surgery to replace the portion of his skull removed immediately after the crash. Carlton had arranged to transport Slifer to Indiana for further rehabilitation. He died on March 30, 2015.

== Tributes ==
Slifer had three fictional characters named at least in part after him:

- John Byrne's robot character Rog-2000 was named as such by Bob Layton in 1974, who was riffing on the amount of "Rogers" – specifically Slifer and Roger Stern – who contributed to the Contemporary Pictorial Literature fanzine.
- The true identity of Ghost Rider villain Inferno, created in 1974 by Tony Isabella and Jim Mooney, is that of a demon named "Slifer, Fear-Monger". Isabella had met Slifer through a mutual friend.
- An Egyptian God card in the Yu-Gi-Oh! Trading Card Game, originally named Sky Dragon of Osiris (オシリスの天空竜, Oshirisu no Tenkūryū), was renamed "Slifer the Sky Dragon" after Slifer by 4Kids Entertainment employee Sam Murakami.

== Bibliography ==
=== Comic books ===
==== DC Comics ====
- Batman #347 (1982)
- Green Lantern / Green Arrow #1 (introduction only) (1983)
- Omega Men #1–13 (1983–1984)

==== Marvel Comics ====
- The Avengers Annual #8 (1978)
- The Defenders #44–47 (1977)
- Fantastic Four #183 (1977)
- Giant-Size Defenders #4–5 (1975)
- Iron Man #84–85 (1976)
- Marvel Two-in-One #13, 38–40 (1976–1978)
- Power Man #46 (1977)

== Screenwriting credits ==
- series head writer denoted in bold

=== Television ===
- G.I. Joe: A Real American Hero (1985)
- The Transformers (1988): season 5 Tommy Kennedy segments
- **Jem** (1986–1988)
- Robocop (1988)
- G.I. Joe: A Real American Hero (1990)
- **Bucky O'Hare and the Toad Wars** (1991)
- My Little Pony Tales (1992)
- Conan the Adventurer (1992–1993)
- **Tenko and the Guardians of the Magic** (1995)
- **G.I. Joe Extreme** (1996): season 2 head writer
- **Street Fighter** (1996): season 2 head writer
- Spider-Man Unlimited (2001)
- Teenage Mutant Ninja Turtles (2006)

=== Film ===
- The Transformers: The Movie (1986): associate story consultant

== Producer ==
=== Television ===
- The Transformers (1985–1986): associate producer for seasons 2–3
- Yu-Gi-Oh! Duel Monsters (2001): co-producer

== See also ==
- Bill Mantlo

Preceded by Gerry Conway	The Defenders writer 1977 (with Gerry Conway and David Anthony Kraft)	Succeeded by David Anthony Kraft
Preceded by n/a	Omega Men writer 1983–1984	Succeeded by Todd Klein
