= Charlton Bullseye (fanzine) =

Armature comics publication

- The cover of The Charlton Bullseye #1, art by Al Milgrom.
- Categories: Charlton Comics news, reviews, and criticism
- Publisher: CPL Gang
- Founded: 1975
- Final issue: September 1976
- Country: United States
- Based in: Indianapolis, Indiana
- Language: English

The Charton Bullseye is a fanzine that was published in 1975–76 by the CPL Gang highlighting Charlton Comics. It was a large format publication, with color covers on card stock and black and white interiors. Charton Bullseye published several previously unpublished Charlton superhero and adventure stories, along with articles on Charlton comics, news, reviews, pinups, and more.

== History ==
The CPL Gang was a group of comics enthusiasts who published the fanzine Contemporary Pictorial Literature (CPL) in the mid-1970s. Founded by Roger Stern and Bob Layton, the CPL Gang included Roger Slifer, Duffy Vohland, and a young John Byrne, all of whom themselves became comics professionals by the end of the 1970s.

CPL rapidly became a popular fan publication, and led to the CPL Gang forming an alliance with Charlton. During the mid-1970s, both Marvel Comics and DC Comics were publishing in-house "fan" publications (F.O.O.M. and The Amazing World of DC Comics respectively), and Charlton wished to make inroads into the superhero market, as well as "establish a fan presence". The CPL Gang first got permission to publish a one-shot called Charlton Portfolio (actually CPL #9/10) in 1974 which included the unpublished sixth issue of Blue Beetle vol. 5 (1967 series).

The positive response to Charlton Portfolio led to the CPL Gang getting approval to publish a Charlton-focused fanzine, Charlton Bullseye. This in turn led to Charlton giving Layton and Stern "access to unpublished material from their vaults by the likes of Steve Ditko, Jeff Jones and a host of others". Much of this material made it into the five issues of Charlton Bullseye.

== Issues ==
1. First half of unpublished Captain Atom #90 story, finished by John Byrne.
2. Second half of unpublished Captain Atom story.
3. Kung Fu issue, unpublished "Wrong Country" by Sanho Kim intended for Yang.
4. (Apr. 1976) — new E-Man story and first half of unpublished final Doomsday+1 story.
5. (Sept. 1976) — new The Question story by Alex Toth and second half of unpublished final Doomsday+1 story.

== See also ==
- Charlton Spotlight
