= Bill Pearson (American writer) =

American journalist

- Born: William Pearson; July 27, 1938 (age 88) Belle Fourche, South Dakota, U.S.
- Areas: Writer, Artist, Editor, Publisher, Letterer
- Notable works: witzend
- Collaborators: Wally Wood

William Pearson (born July 27, 1938), known professionally as Bill Pearson, is an American novelist, publisher, editor, artist, comic book scripter and letterer, notable as the editor-publisher of his own graphic story publication, witzend.

== Biography ==
=== Early years ===
Born in Belle Fourche, South Dakota, Pearson was employed in 1957 as a technical illustrator at the Ziff Davis publishing firm and began night classes at the School of Visual Arts, including an anatomy course taught by Burne Hogarth. Work as a technical illustrator for the Underwood Typewriter Company in 1959 was followed by two years as a mechanical draftsman at Motorola in Phoenix, Arizona.

While serving in the military at Fort Polk in Louisiana during the early 1960s, he met artist Ed Paschke. Working together in Fort Polk's Training Aids Department, they provided illustrations for publications, signs, targets and manuals to explain weapons and procedures to incoming troops. The two remained lifelong friends, and Paschke later was a contributor to Pearson's witzend.

Bill Pearson's cover for witzend #11 (1978)

During the mid to late 1960s, Pearson was an artist and production manager with the Manhattan art agency Admaster Prints, which had many national clients, including Citibank, the New York Life Insurance Company and Winchester Rifles. Income from Admaster and various freelance jobs made it possible for Pearson to underwrite his witzend (which had no national distributor and carried no advertising).

=== Comic books ===
==== witzend ====
As a close associate of Wally Wood, Pearson made many contributions to projects at the Wally Wood Studio. When Wood launched his alternative comics magazine, witzend in 1966, Pearson was an associate editor, and after the fourth issue, Wood turned witzend over to Pearson with an agreement that at least four more issues would appear.

Pearson, using the publisher name Wonderful Publishing Company, edited and published witzend for many years, continuing it into the 1980s. One entire issue focused on W.C. Fields, and a special theme issue, Good Girls, filled page after page with good girl art.

==== T.H.U.N.D.E.R. Agents ====
While he was still an assistant on witzend in the mid-1960s, he became involved in the creation of Wood's T.H.U.N.D.E.R. Agents team for Tower Comics. In addition to scripting a half-dozen NoMan tales for T.H.U.N.D.E.R. Agents and an equal number of Undersea Agent adventures, he did ghostwriting on Wood's Dynamo scripts. In 2003-05, these stories were collected into hardback books as part of DC Comics' five-volume T.H.U.N.D.E.R. Agents Archive series. The many examples of collaborations between Wood and Pearson include the cover of The Wallace Wood Checklist (2003).

==== Charlton and other publishers ====
While an editor at Charlton Comics during the 1970s and early 1980s, Pearson designed and colored over 200 comic book covers. Equally extensive were the numerous comic book scripts the prolific Pearson wrote for a wide variety of publishers, including Gold Key, Tower Comics, King Comics (Flash Gordon), Charlton, Eclipse, Gladstone and Warren Publications. He was the writer of Gold Key's Popeye the Sailor comic book throughout the late 1970s and early 1980s.

His work as an inker included Ocean's Popeye: Borned to the Sea (1987) and a Spider-Man spoof. For two decades (1975–95), he lettered for almost every comics publisher, and he was the first art director at Another Rainbow.

==== Eros ====
Pearson has edited several books of Wood's comics for Eros Comix, an imprint of Fantagraphics Books. These include Cannon (1991), Sally Forth (1993–95) and Naughty Knotty Wood (1998). In 2002, he published his own drawings, inked by Wood, in three portfolios—Fancy Animals, Human Beans and Naked Aliens. Each Pearson/Wood portfolio has 12 plates in an illustrated envelope, and each was published in a limited edition of 500 copies.

=== Novels ===
==== Drifter's Detour ====
His mystery novel, Drifter's Detour (2007), displays an unusual visual concept. The story is highlighted by more than 40 illustrations by 20 artists, including Dan Adkins, Jim Amash, Richard Bassford, Nick Cuti, Steve Fiorilla, Michael T. Gilbert, Dennis Janke, Gary Kato, Russ Miller, Mitch O'Connell, James Romberger, Guy Staats, Joe Staton, Steve Stiles, Jim Steranko, Ronn Sutton, Jim Wheelock and Pearson himself. In the book's concluding acknowledgments page, Pearson explained:

Yes, it's obvious the characters don't resemble each other from picture to picture, but that's on purpose. I wanted each artist to envision the story and people in it from their own perspective, without a lot of restricting guidelines. Everybody knows Rhett Butler looks exactly like Clark Gable, but every reader of Gone with the Wind had their own idea about his appearance before the movie was made. Early on, I made a point that my hero, Rance, wasn't handsome at all, but I knew most of the guys would make him so. We all want to enhance ourselves and our heroes in our minds, and artists are only human.

==== Dancing Partners ====
Dancing Partners, a comedy/chase novel with many classic movie stars as characters, was published by xLibris, an online print-on-demand publishing company in 2010.

==== Last Of The Wolfdragons ====
In 2015, Last Of The Wolfdragons, a science fiction novel, was also published by xLibris, with a cover illustration by the author.

== See also ==
- List of novelists from the United States

== Sources ==
- Comic Book Database: Bill Pearson
