= Ron Whyte =

American dramatist

- Born: November 18, 1941; Black Eagle, Montana, U.S.
- Died: September 13, 1989 (aged 47); New Haven, Connecticut, U.S.
- Education: Whitworth University; San Francisco State University (BA); Yale University (MFA); Columbia University (M.Div.)

Ronald Melville Whyte (1941–1989) was an American playwright, critic, and disability rights activist.

== Early life ==
Whyte was born November 18, 1941, in Black Eagle, Montana, to Eva Ranieri, a homemaker. and Henry Melville Whyte, a railroad machinist. The family moved to Great Falls, Montana and later to St. Paul, Minnesota.

Whyte was born with congenital birth defects of both legs and one arm, and as a child he was put in leg braces built by his father and walked with the help of these devices. He was run over by a school bus in an accident while he was in high school, and both of his ankles were crushed. By the time he was at the end of his college years in San Francisco, he opted to have then-experimental surgery that amputated both legs below the knees, and after a period of recovery he began wearing prostheses.

== Education ==
Whyte attended University of Minnesota High School, studying with Arthur H. Ballet, among others. He completed his studies in Spokane, Washington, where the family had moved as his father held a series of increasingly responsible positions with the Great Northern Railway.

He attended Whitworth College in Spokane for one year, then transferred to San Francisco State University, where he studied drama. Among his professors was Kay Boyle. After receiving a Bachelor of Arts, he was accepted for graduate study at the Yale School of Drama, from which he received a master of fine arts degree in 1967. His professors at Yale included Dean Robert Brustein, theater historian John Gassner, film and theatre critic Stanley Kauffmann, critic Harold Clurman, with whom he later worked at The Actors Studio in New York, and Stella Adler. He subsequently enrolled at Union Theological Seminary in the City of New York of Columbia University, from which he received a master of divinity (M.Div.) degree in 1976. At Union, his mentor was the founder of Black Liberation Theology, James H. Cone. He was a member of The Riverside Church in New York during the ministry of William Sloane Coffin and was in care for ordination as a minister in the United Church of Christ.

== Professional activities ==
=== Literature ===
As a young man, Whyte was a contributor to the Baum Bugle of the L. Frank Baum Scholarship and The Baker Street Journal ("an irregular quarterly of Sherlockiana," and the journal of The Baker Street Irregulars).

While a student at Yale School of Drama, he was a writer in the 1960s for Marvel Comics, authoring stories in Marvel's Western series, including Rawhide Kid, Two-Gun Kid, and Kid Colt. A comic-book character created by Whyte at Yale, "Method Man," was the subject of a graphic issue of a 1967 Yale Drama Review. Whyte also wrote for the magazines Creepy and Eerie in the 1960s. He compiled his experiences as an author into a book, contracted with St. Martin's Press but was not able to complete it before his death.

In the late 1970s, Whyte was one of the literary artists in the Cultural Council Foundation CETA Artists Project in New York City.

Whyte was Arts Editor and Book Review Editor of the SoHo Weekly News in New York; Drama Editor of The American Book Review; and a book reviewer for other publications. His books included The Flower That Finally Grew; the play Welcome To Andromeda and Variety Obit, and Disability: A Comedy (New York: Theatre Development Fund, 1983).

=== Theater ===
==== Playwriting ====
While in San Francisco, Whyte wrote the first of more than a hundred playscripts and screenplays. At the Yale School of Drama in 1968, he wrote Welcome To Andromeda, a one-act play for two characters written. It was produced in workshop in 1969 at The American Place Theatre in New York before going on to an Off-Broadway production at the Cherry Lane Theatre in 1973. The work was named one of the Ten Best Plays of 1973 by Time magazine, which said of it: "The hero was almost totally paralyzed, but Ron Whyte's first play quivered with instinctual dramatic life." David Richards, theater critic for the Washington Star called Whyte "the most original dramatic voice since Edward Albee." Welcome To Andromeda was also performed at Postus-Teatret in Copenhagen, Denmark, and the Actors Theatre of Louisville in 1975. It was published in an acting edition by Samuel French.

Whyte's first major theatrical production was the play-with-music or musical Horatio, based on the life and stories of Horatio Alger, with music by Broadway composer Mel Marvin. Horatio was produced at the Loretto-Hilton Theatre in St. Louis, Missouri, 1970; Arena Stage in Washington, D.C., 1974, and the American Conservatory Theater in San Francisco, 1976.

He also wrote the autobiographical play-with-music Funeral March for a One-Man Band, with earlier versions including the title X: Notes on a Personal Mythology. Funeral March received its first Off-Broadway production at Westbeth Theatre Center in New York in 1978 and subsequent productions at the St. Nicholas Theatre in Chicago in 1979 and 1981. The 1979 Chicago production received four Joseph Jefferson Awards including Best Musical Production. The play had music again by Mel Marvin and was conceived in collaboration with H. Thomas Moore (Tom Moore).

Another play was an adaptation of Victor Hugo's The Hunchback of Notre Dame, produced first at the American Festival Theatre in Milford, New Hampshire, in 1979 and subsequently expanded in a production at Joseph Papp's New York Shakespeare Festival (The Public Theater) in 1981.

At the Actors Studio, Whyte wrote a second act for Welcome To Andromeda and the now two-act play was premiered with Ellen Burstyn in the role of the Nurse. The two-act version was titled Andromeda II. Whyte wrote a third act later, Andromeda III, but it has not yet been performed.

Whyte wrote Disability: A Comedy, which drew on his own experience as a disabled person. It tells the story of a young quadriplegic man, Larry, trapped at home in a Manhattan apartment with his parents, who takes out a personal ad to meet a young woman. Whyte dedicated the play to Alfred Hitchcock. Disability was first performed in workshop at Arena Stage in Washington, D.C,. in the Old Vat Room as a workshop in 1979 and then in full production in Arena's Kreeger Theatre in 1982. Productions followed at the Mark Taper Forum in Los Angeles and the Odyssey Theatre, also in Los Angeles, where the play received a Drama-Logue Award for Best Play. Disability was performed at the Actors Theatre of St. Paul, for which production the play was nominated for the 1983 Pulitzer Prize in Drama. In 1990, it was produced at the Detroit Repertory Company. Most recently, Disability was produced in 2003 at Frank Condon's River Stage in Sacramento, California, where the Sacramento Bee wrote: "... amazing ... excellent ... Rarely does a play energize, stimulate--and surprise--the way DISABILITY does."

In 2022, Whyte's theatre work was recognized with his inclusion in the book 50 Key Figures in Queer US Theatre, in a profile written by theatre scholar Patrick McKelvey.

==== Backstage ====
While serving both as Playwright-in-Residence as well as Coordinator of the Playwrights and Directors Unit (established by Clifford Odets) at The Actors Studio and working directly with Harold Clurman and Lee Strasberg, Whyte organized a 1981 Festival of New Plays that included first productions of works by Ishmael Reed, John Ford Noonan, John Guare, and Christopher Durang. Whyte left The Actors Studio after the Strasberg's death.

=== Film and television ===
Whyte wrote the scripts for three films that received commercial theatrical release: Valentine Eve (1967); The Happiness Cage (later retitled The Mind Snatchers) (1972), directed by Bernard Girard; and Pigeons (Sidelong Glances of a Pigeon Kicker) (1970), directed by John Dexter. He also wrote teleplays for several programs including Look Up and Live on CBS-TV and the syndicated series Tales from the Dark Side.

== Activism ==
Whyte's work as a disability rights activist led him to found A.N.D.: The National Task Force for Disability and the Arts in 1978 and brought him in advisory capacities onto boards and committees that included the New York State Council on the Arts, the John F. Kennedy Center for the Performing Arts, the National Endowment for the Arts, and the President's Committee on Employment of the Handicapped.

== Honors ==
Whyte received several Sam Shubert Fellowships while at the Yale School of Drama; a Rockefeller Foundation Playwrights Fellowship in 1981; the Joseph Jefferson Award for Best Musical in Chicago in 1979; nomination for the Pulitzer Prize in Drama in 1983, and the Drama-Logue Award for Best Play in Los Angeles in both 1978 and 1989.

== Death and legacy ==
Whyte died of a cerebral hemorrhage on September 13, 1989, while summering in the New Haven, Connecticut, home of Rep. Paula Elliott Bradley and Dr. William Lee Bradley, the parents of his longtime partner, Paul William Bradley, a minister and seminary administrator. He was buried in the Grove Street Cemetery in New Haven.

Whyte's archives and papers are in the collection of the Beinecke Rare Book and Manuscript Library of Yale University. His library of 5,000 drama and theatre books was donated after his death primarily to The New School's library in New York City, as well as several hundred items to the Esther Raushenbush Library at Sarah Lawrence College. Several hundred non-theater-related items from Whyte's collection are held by the General Research Division of the New York Public Library in New York City. The manuscript of The Story of Film is held by the Smithsonian Archives of American Art of the Smithsonian Institution in New York City in its Gregory Battcock Papers.

== Bibliography ==
- Disability: A Comedy. New York: Theatre Development Fund, 1983.
- The Flower That Finally Grew. New York: Crown Publishers, 1970.
- Welcome To Andromeda and Variety Obit. New York: Samuel French & Co., 1973. Catalogue copy
- "Welcome to Andromeda," The Best Short Plays of 1974, edited by Stanley Richards. Philadelphia: Chilton, 1975.
- "Exeunt Dying: Theatrical Mysteries." Murder Ink: The Mystery Reader's Companion, edited by Dilys Winn. Workman Publishing, 1977.
- A Guide to Arena Stage Historical Documents 1950-1998, Repository: Special Collections and Archives, George Mason University

== Sources ==
- Whyte, Ron (September 19, 1989). "Ron Whyte, 47, Dead; Playwright of Disabled". The New York Times.
- "Ron Whyte Screenwriter, Biography,"
- Kalem, T.E., "Dolphin in the Dark: Welcome to Andromeda and Variety Obit," TIME, February 26, 1973,
- Ron Whyte Papers. Yale Collection of American Literature, Beinecke Rare Book and Manuscript Library.
