= Overseas Weekly =

Newspaper published in Frankfurt, Germany

The Overseas Weekly was an English-language newspaper published in Frankfurt, Germany, from 1950 to 1975. Its primary audience was American military personnel stationed in Europe, especially enlisted men and especially in Germany, reaching a circulation of about 50,000 copies a week. Sister publications eventually included Overseas Family and Overseas Traveler, as well as a Pacific edition during the height of the Vietnam War. Conflict with the U.S. military establishment was a frequent occurrence.

== History ==
The OW was founded by an American civilian, Marion von Rospach, and three male colleagues who were then completing their military service. With a capitalization of $3,000, they produced their early issues out of their homes and "an elderly Volkswagen." With the outbreak of the Korean War in June 1950, the men were retained in the U.S. Air Force and left Rospach to carry on alone. By focusing on stories too racy for the official military daily, Stars and Stripes, OW had a circulation of 15,000 by 1953, when the military establishment banned it from base newsstands on the grounds of "sensationalism" and denied its use of the printing and circulation facilities of Stars and Stripes. Rospach enlisted the help of California Sen. William F. Knowland and filed suit against the Secretary of Defense, Charles Erwin Wilson, actions that succeeded in lifting the ban and increasing its profile.

Rospach rented offices in the Frankfurt Press Club, contracted with the Frankfurter Allgemeine Zeitung to print the newspaper and hired a staff of German and expatriate civilians and former U.S. military men, with the Americans paid a starting salary of $60 a week, later raised to $70. An early hire was a German-born ex-serviceman, John Dornberg, who became the paper's news editor and later a correspondent for Newsweek and author of books such as Schizophrenic Germany and articles about Germany and Eastern Europe. Life magazine took note of the newspaper about this time, describing Rospach as "a stubby dynamo of a woman" and OW as "the bane of the U.S. armed forces command in Germany."

"The OW was a tabloid whose front page featured a partially clad young woman and two or more enticing headlines--sometimes printed in red ink--on the lines of "LT SEDUCED MY WIFE, GENIUS GI TELLS COURT." Courts-martial, generally not covered by the Stars and Stripes, was a news staple, along with more pin-up photos, the comic strip Beetle Bailey and an editorial bias that favored enlisted men over their officers. To the military it was known as the "Oversexed Weekly". In 1958 Rospach added a second weekly, the Overseas Family, edited by Cecil Neff and more genteel in content, to appeal to the wives and children of military personnel.

In 1961 an OW reporter broke the story of the "pro-Blue" program sponsored by Maj. Gen. Edwin Walker, commander of the U.S. Army's 24th Infantry Division in Augsburg. In a front-page story, the newspaper accused Walker of brainwashing soldiers with right-wing materials from the John Birch Society In return, Walker condemned the OW as "immoral, unscrupulous, corrupt and destructive." Relieved of his command and passed over for promotion, Walker resigned from the U.S. Army that October.

Curtis Daniell, a recently discharged serviceman, became the OW's executive editor in 1963, when the newspaper reached a weekly circulation of about 50,000. As the Vietnam War began to intensify, Daniell hoped to publish a Pacific edition but was refused space on military newsstands in South Vietnam. Nevertheless, in 1966 he sent reporter Ann Bryan to Saigon to establish a bureau there, and in time she won permission to publish a Pacific edition of the OW, printed in Hong Kong and flown to Saigon each week.

Rospach died from a fall at her home in New York City in October 1969, at which time the New York Times estimated its circulation as 40,000. The Overseas Weekly was purchased from her estate by Joe Kroesen, with Daniell continuing as executive editor.

The OW ceased publication in 1975.
