= Dan Adkins =

American illustrator (1937–2013)

- Dan Adkins c.1975
- Born: Danny L. Adkins; March 15, 1937 Midkiff, West Virginia, U.S.
- Died: May 3, 2013 (aged 76) Reading, Pennsylvania, U.S.
- Areas: Penciller, Inker
- Awards: Inkwell Awards Joe Sinnott Hall of Fame (2019)

Danny L. Adkins (March 15, 1937 – May 3, 2013) was an American illustrator who worked mainly for comic books and science-fiction magazines.

== Biography ==
=== Early life and career ===
Dan Adkins was born in West Virginia, in the basement of an unfinished house. He left the state "when I was about 7" as his family moved to Pennsylvania; Reno, Nevada; Phoenix, Arizona; New York; Ohio; and New Jersey. When he was "about 11" years old, Adkins said, he had a bout with rheumatic fever that left him paralyzed from the waist down for six months. Serving in the Air Force in the mid-1950s, stationed at Luke Field outside Phoenix, Adkins was a draftsman. As he described the job,

If a change was made to a building on the base, we'd have to update the blueprints. I also drew a lot of electronics stuff, engine corrections, etc. After I got a second stripe as Airman Second Class, I became an illustrator, from about eight months after basic training, for the remaining three years I was in the service. When I got out, I was the equivalent of a staff sergeant. As an illustrator, I had a whole room to myself with equipment to turn out posters to put in front of the base library or movie theatre. We also did a magazine where we'd list all the happenings. We had to spend a certain amount of money per month in order to get the same amount the next month. And I couldn't come up with enough things to spend the money on, so I started a fanzine.

Launched in 1956, that publication was Sata, filled with fantasy illustrations and reproduced on a spirit duplicator. In Phoenix, Arizona, Adkins met artist-writer Bill Pearson who signed on as Sata's co-editor. In 1959, Pearson became the sole editor of Sata, ending the 13-issue run with several offset-printed issues . Adkins contributed to numerous other fan publications, including Amra, Vega and Xero.

At 19, Adkins began doing freelance illustration for science-fiction magazines. He moved to New York City and when he was "about 24" years old was an art director for the Hearst Corporation's American Druggist and New Medical Material magazines. As he recalled:

We turned out 92-page biweekly medical journals. We had this big dummy room with all these shelves where we laid out every sheet. You had to order the galleys, what they called thumbnails, which is a block of print that's a photograph. I learned a lot there. I quit after about three months and went into advertising, working for Advertising Super Mart, where I did paste-up mechanicals, then Le Wahl Studios.

=== Silver Age of comic books ===
Dr. Strange #169 (June 1968). Cover art by Adkins.

In 1964, during the period comic-book fans and historians call the Silver Age of Comics, Adkins joined the Wally Wood Studio as Wood's assistant. Wood and Adkins collaborated on a series of stories for Warren Publishing's black-and-white horror-comics magazines Creepy and Eerie. Adkins was among the original artists of Wood's T.H.U.N.D.E.R. Agents, for Tower Comics, drawing many Dynamo stories during his 16 months in the Wood Studio.

He joined Marvel Comics in 1967. working primarily as an inker but also penciling several stories for Doctor Strange and other titles. Adkins additionally worked for a variety of comics publishers, including Charlton Comics, DC Comics (Aquaman, Batman), Dell Comics/Western Publishing, Eclipse Comics, Harvey Comics, Marvel, and Pacific Comics.

In addition to penciling and inking, Adkins also did cover paintings, including for Amazing Stories, Eerie (issue 12) and Famous Monsters of Filmland (issues 44, 46). His magazine illustrations were published in Argosy (with Wood), Amazing Stories, Fantastic, Galaxy Science Fiction, Infinity, Monster Parade, Science-Fiction Adventures, Spectrum, Worlds of If and other magazines.

In the 2000s, he illustrated Parker Brothers products, and his artwork for Xero was reprinted in the hardback The Best of Xero (Tachyon, 2004).

== Awards ==
In 2019, Adkins was inducted into the Inkwell Awards Joe Sinnott Hall of Fame for his lifetime achievement and outstanding accomplishments.

== Personal life ==
Adkins was married to Jeanette Strouse.

Adkins died May 3, 2013, at age 76.
