= Jessie Lilley =

American writer, editor and small-press magazine publisher

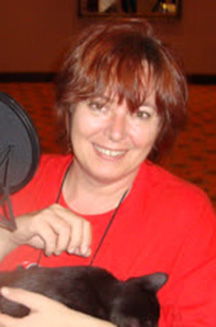
- Born: April 24, 1958 (age 68); Greenwich Village, New York City
- Occupations: Writer, editor, publisher
- Writing career
- Notable works: Publisher: Scarlet Street Magazine; Editor: Famous Monsters of Filmland, Worldly Remains, Mondo Cult
- Website: mondocult.com

Jessie Lilley is an American writer, editor and small-press magazine publisher best known as the original publisher of Scarlet Street magazine. She is currently editor-in-chief of Mondo Cult. magazine.

Lilley began publishing Scarlet Street in 1990 before her association with a number of small-press film magazines like RetroVision, Chiller Magazine, Worldly Remains: A Pop Culture Review, Cinefantastique, Scary Monsters, Femme Fatales, Little Shoppe of Horrors and the recent re-launch of Famous Monsters of Filmland. One of the first women active in this area of publishing, Lilley was a Monster Kid Hall of Fame Inductee at the 2012 Rondo Awards. She has edited two books - You Grew Up: the Life and Career of Paul Reed, Sr. and Gloria, the memoir of Bond girl Gloria Hendry.

She has small roles in a few direct-to-video features and was an occasional guest of Joe Franklin's on WWOR-TV. She was married to musician David Paul Campbell (1946-2022) with whom she founded Mudbug International Records. Ms. Lilley resides in Santa Cruz County, CA.

== Chairs ==
- Monterey Bay News & Views (California Central Coast) - Writer
- Cinefantastique (print) - Editor
- Valley Scene Magazine (LA) - Writer
- Mondo Cult - Editor-In-Chief
- Famous Monsters of Filmland - Editor
- Mondo Cult - President and Publisher
- Femme Fatales - Writer
- SPFX - Writer
- RetroVision - Managing Editor
- Scarlet Street - President and Publisher
