= WonderFest =

American fan convention

WonderFest is an American fan convention focusing on science fiction and horror, held annually since 1992 after two years as a predecessor event. "One of the biggest hobby events in the country," it takes place in Louisville, Kentucky, and is the site of the annual presentation of the Rondo Hatton Classic Horror Awards.

== History ==
WonderFest originated in 1990 as the hobbyist club The Scale Figure Modelers Society's Louisville Plastic Kit & Toy Show, held at a Ramada Inn hotel. The club had been founded the year before by Irwin Severs and Larry Johnson. In 1992, the convention changed its name to WonderFest, and was held at a larger venue. Four years later, it relocated to its current home, the hotel Crowne Plaza, formerly Executive West. The convention formally split off from the hobbyist club after the 1997 show. The edition originally scheduled for May 30–31, 2020, and then October 24–25, 200, was canceled because of the COVID-19 pandemic.

Guests throughout the years have included filmmakers / TV producers Joe Dante, D. C. Fontana, Nicholas Meyer, Greg Nicotero, and George A. Romero, genre-film actors and actresses Dirk Benedict, Martine Beswick, Veronica and Angela Cartwright, Joanna Cassidy, Yvonne Craig, Claudia Christian, Denise Crosby, Sybil Danning, Keir Dullea, Anne Francis, Marta Kristen, Gary Lockwood, Kevin McCarthy, Lee Meriwether, Caroline Munro, Robert Picardo, Linnea Quigley, and Brinke Stevens, special effects artists Ray Harryhausen, Tom Savini, and Chris Walas, comics and children's-book writers / artists Frank Cho, Basil Gogos, Joe Jusko, Michael Kaluta, Mark Schultz, William Stout, and Bernie Wrightson, and horror scions Sara Karloff and Vanessa Harryhausen. It also features cosplayers.

Events there include the annual presentation of the Rondo Hatton Classic Horror Awards and the WonderFest Model Contest, hosted by Amazing Figure Modeler magazine. Charitable outreach has included raffles to benefit the Pediatric AIDS Foundation and the WHAS Crusade for Children.

In 2014, three Louisville, Kentucky-based podcasters attempted to set a Guinness World Record at WonderFest for the Longest Uninterrupted Webcast (now called now Longest Audio-Only Live Stream), Tower of Technobabble, to raise money for a local animal organization's spay and neuter program. They set the then-record of 41 hours.

The CEO as of 2004 was Dave Hodge. As of 2022, its CEO was Melina Angstrom.

== See also ==
- Wonder Festival
