= Rui Kumae =

Japanese model

- 熊江 琉唯
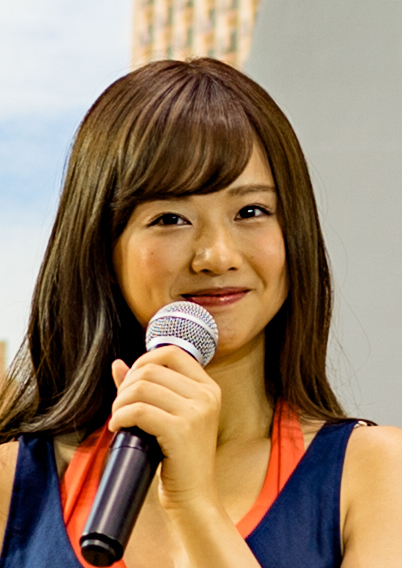
- Born: 17 April 1995 (age 31); Sichuan, China
- Other name: Kumako (くまこ、くま子)
- Citizenship: Japan
- Occupations: Model; tarento; gravure idol
- Years active: 2015–
- Modeling information
- Height: 172 cm (5 ft 8 in) (2015)
- Agency: Idea

Rui Kumae
- Simplified Chinese: 熊江琉唯
Transcriptions
Standard Mandarin
- Hanyu Pinyin: Xióngjiāng Liúwéi

Rui Kumae (熊江 琉唯, Kumae Rui; born 17 April 1995, in Sichuan) is a Chinese Japanese model, tarento, and gravure idol.

She is represented with the agency Idea and she has a business alliance with Hour Songs Creative from K-Dash.

== Biography ==
She started in the modelling business from her high school days, and started full-fledged activities while entering university.

In the Wonder Festival on 8 February 2015 of 2015 Winter, she was introduced as a new member of the "Racing Mix Supporters 2015" and debuted as a race queen at the 1st Okayama International Circuit of the Super GT on 4 April. From 2 July she made regular appearances in Jisedai Idol Hakkutsu Variety: Ninki-sha ni narou! as a candidate for Nikkei Telegenic 2015, and was elected Nittelegenic 2015 on 10 September, and on 18 December she released the image DVD Ryuki's Color Time.

On 28 February 2016, she participated in the Tokyo Marathon.

On 19 March of the same year, she was elected as the Tokyo Girls Collection Official Running Team Tokyo Girls Run 5th grader, and on 25 March became a regular weather presenter on Pon! on Mondasy. As a member of the Tokyo Girls Run on 22 May she ran in the Karuizawa Half Marathon and finished in 2 hours and 6 minutes. She was selected as "2017 San Ai Swimsuit Image Girl" on 7 November.

== Personal life ==
Kumae was born in China, where she spent her early childhood. She is fluent in Chinese and also teaches the language.

== Works ==
=== Videos ===
Date	Title	Publisher
18 Dec 2015	Ryuki's Color Time	E-Net Frontier

== Filmography ==
=== Television ===
Dates	Title	Network	Notes
2 July–Sep 2015	Jisedai Idol Hakkutsu Variety: Ninki-sha ni narou!	NTV	
28 Mar 2016 –	Pon!	NTV	Monday weather presenter (– 27 Mar 2017); Entertainment reporter (Jan 2017 – )
26 Mar 2017 –	Ichiya zuke	TX	Assistant (5th)

=== Radio ===
Dates	Title	Network	Notes
16 Apr 2017 –	Ore-tachi gocha maze'!: Atsumare Yang Yang	MBS Radio	9th Generation Yang Yang Girl

=== Shows ===
Date	Show
27 Sep 2015	Tokyo Girls Collection
19 Mar 2016	Tokyo Girls Collection

=== Race queen ===
Year	Title	Notes
2015	Racing Mix Supporters	Other members: Noa Mizutani, Tsukasa Arai, Kelal Yamamura

=== Events ===
Date	Title	Location
8 Feb 2015	Wonder Festival 2015 Winter	Makuhari Messe
11 Jul 2015	Galpara Tanabata Festival 2015	Pasera Resorts Akiba
26 Jul 2015	Wonder Festival 2015 Summer	Makuhari Messe
15 Aug 2015	Ninki-sha ni narou! Blue	Pia31 Bayside
22–23 2015	Chara Hobi 2015 C3×Hobby	Makuhari Messe
5 Sep 2015	"Jisedai Idol Hakkutsu Variety: Ninki-sha ni narou!" Special Event "Fascinating Summer Festival 2015"	Premiere Yokohama

=== Advertisements ===
Title	Ref.
2017 San Ai Swimsuit Image Girl	

== Bibliography ==
=== Magazines ===
Title	No.	Ref.
Weekly Playboy	21 Sep 2015	
Weekly Young Jump	14 Jun 2016	
Ray	Sep 2016	
