= Bill Diamond =

American puppeteer and producer (born 1957)

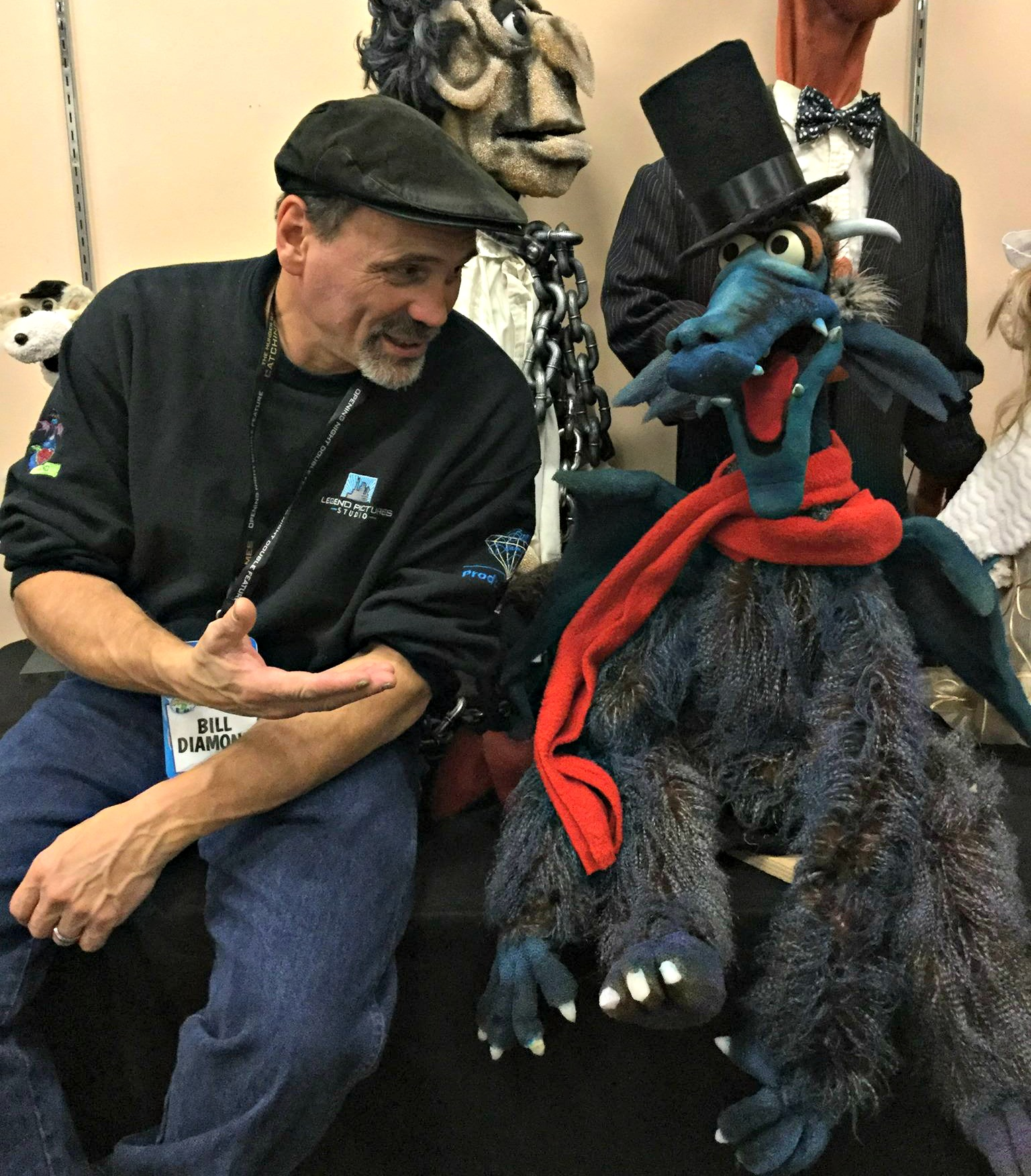
Bill Diamond with Gorgo the Gargoyle at a fan convention in Hanover, MA

Bill Diamond (born June 5, 1957) is an American puppeteer, puppet fabricator, producer, set designer, and lighting director. He worked for Jim Henson at his New York office, and has won three Emmy Awards for his work on the YES Network.

== Background ==
Diamond began his career in the entertainment industry as a child actor. As a teenager in High School, he created his own stop-motion animation films, ran his own theatre company, and began building puppets. At the age of twenty-three, Diamond was introduced to Muppet’s creator, Jim Henson.

== Career ==
In 1976, Diamond created his production company, Bill Diamond Productions. Diamond produced and directed multiple television series in the ’80s and ’90s, including Stuffy’s Place, The Land of the Moonshins, and Dr. Rock’s Dinosaur Adventures, which appeared on Fox. He was also the associate producer of the documentaries, The Phantom of the Opera: Unmasking the Masterpiece, and The Aurora Monsters: The Model Craze That Gripped the World.

The off-Broadway version of Audrey 2, the carnivorous plant from Little Shop of Horrors, was originally created by Sesame Street puppeteer Martin P. Robinson. The play became extremely popular, and in 1984, Diamond was hired to build and puppeteer Audrey 2, and still operates the giant plant puppet for the Little Shop of Horrors road tours to this day.

In 2001, a massive blaze completely engulfed Diamond's studio in Peekskill, New York. Over 200 of Diamond's puppets and original creations were destroyed. Diamond rebuilt the studio in an industrial complex in Cornwall, New York, but in January 2012, a six alarm fire destroyed the majority of that industrial complex. Diamond's studio and creations survived the second fire, leaving only water damage in the complex. The smoke from the fire was seen from the George Washington Bridge more than 40 miles away.

In 2016, The Jim Henson Company sponsored a fan film competition held on The Dark Crystal website. The competition invited fans to create and submit animated short films inspired by the Jim Henson film. Bill Diamond Productions submitted a short film for the competition titled, “Rise of the Skeksis”, and received an honorable mention.

In 2021, the first episode of the Toking with the Dead series was released to the public. This production, directed and produced by Bill Diamond, and based on the comic book of the same name, is a series based on educating through adult humor the positive effects of medical cannabis.

In 2021, Bill Diamond Productions released their holiday special, Claus and the Fairies. The film was written and created by Tammy Stallard, and sponsored by The Beast Within Productions. The charming holiday special, based on the early folklore of Santa Claus being a part of the fairy kingdom, features quaint character puppets such as Gnome Brooks, narrated by Gremlins and Salacious B. Crumb (Return of the Jedi) voice actor, Mark Dodson (actor), which also features other voices of fairies, gnomes, and sprites in the film. Bill Diamond puppeteers multiple characters in the production.

Diamond designed and built sets for the 2024 slasher film, Terrifier 3. He is also an associate producer on the film.

Since 2024, Diamond has produced and hosted his travel show, Bill Diamond on the Road. The series documents the travels of Bill Diamond and his production team as they film movies and television projects, make appearances at comic and fan conventions, and explore notable attractions in each town they visit. The program showcases local restaurants, hotels, historical sites, and other points of interest while providing a behind-the-scenes look at the group's productions and travels.

As of 2026, Diamond has produced, directed, and hosted an ongoing docuseries about illustrator Basil Gogos and his work for Famous Monsters of Filmland magazine. The series is entitled Basil Gogos: King of the Monsters and includes interviews with Gogos and others such as James Warren, Forrest J Ackerman, Daniel Roebuck, and Victoria Price.

== Awards ==
In 2005, Bill Diamond was presented with an Aurora Award for his television creation, Monster TV Network, which "reunites the classic horror monsters (in puppet form) in their very own show".

Diamond won a bronze Telly Award for producing and directing the show, Mike Bennett on the Road, in 2008.

In 2015, Diamond won his first Emmy Award for his work on the YES Network's Yankees Post Game Show - Mo’s Last Home Game as the lighting director.

He won his second Emmy in 2017 for set design on the YES Network for Brooklyn Nets Specialty Set Design, and was nominated for another for lighting director for YES's Brooklyn Nets Specialty Look.

In 2019, Diamond's company, Bill Diamond Productions, was one of the Telly Award's Silver Winners for the Entertainment General-Online category. The company received the award for their production, Gorgo's Christmas Carol Narrated by Vincent Price.

Diamond won his third Emmy Award in 2020. This time for set design for the YES Network's Yankees Buzz in the Bronx.

Bill Diamond and Bill Diamond Productions won their third Telly Award in the Bronze category in 2021 for their production of "Claus and the Fairies”, written and created by Tammy Stallard.

Bill Diamond and the Bill Diamond Productions crew won their fourth Telly Award in the Bronze category in 2024 for the first episode of their new streaming series Gorgo's Graveyard Shift. The series features celebrity interviews from the Monster TV Network host, Gorgo the Gargoyle. The first episode features interviews with Lucinda Jenney, Sam Irvin, and Veronica Carlson.

Bill Diamond's docuseries, Basil Gogos: The King of the Monsters won the 2026 Rondo Award for Best Documentary.
