= The Ultimate Thrill =

1974 film by Robert Butler

- Directed by: Robert Butler
- Written by: John McGinn (story); John Rester Zodrow (writer)
- Produced by: William D. Sklar; Peter S. Traynor
- Starring: Barry Brown; Britt Ekland; Eric Braeden; Michael Blodgett
- Cinematography: Isidore Mankofsky
- Edited by: Peter Parasheles
- Music by: Ed Townsend
- Production company: Century Films
- Distributed by: General Film Corporation
- Release date: October 1974
- Running time: 110 min.
- Country: United States
- Language: English
- Budget: $650,000

The Ultimate Thrill is a 1974 American thriller film directed by Robert Butler and starring Barry Brown, Britt Ekland and Eric Braeden. It was also released under the title Ultimate Chase. The soundtrack was by Ed Townsend which to the present day has not been released.

== Cast ==
- Barry Brown as Joe Straker
- Britt Ekland as Michele Parlay
- Eric Braeden as Roland Parlay
- Michael Blodgett as Tom
- John Davis Chandler as Evans
- Ed Baierlein as Webster
- Paul Feliz as Fielder
- Carol Adams as The Secretary
- Sam Darling as The Bartender
- June Goodman as Pretzel
- Mary Hampton as Woman At Deli
- David Kahn as Denver Clerk
- Hallie McCollum as Day Clerk
- Ronald L. Schwary as Danny
- Gary Tessler as Night Clerk

== See also ==
- List of American films of 1974
