= Bad Company (1972 film) =

1972 American Western film directed by Robert Benton

- Theatrical release poster
- Directed by: Robert Benton
- Written by: Robert Benton; David Newman
- Produced by: Stanley R. Jaffe
- Starring: Barry Brown; Jeff Bridges; Jim Davis; David Huddleston
- Cinematography: Gordon Willis
- Edited by: Ron Kalish; Ralph Rosenblum
- Music by: Harvey Schmidt
- Distributed by: Paramount Pictures
- Release date: October 20, 1972
- Running time: 93 minutes
- Country: United States
- Language: English

Bad Company is a 1972 American Western film directed by Robert Benton (in his directorial debut), who also co-wrote the film with David Newman. It stars Barry Brown and Jeff Bridges as Jake Rumsey and Drew Dixon, two of a group of young men who flee the draft during the American Civil War to seek their fortune and freedom on the unforgiving American frontier.

Later classified by critics as an acid Western, Bad Company attempts in many ways to demythologize the American West in its portrayal of young men forced by circumstance and drawn by romanticized accounts to forge new lives for themselves on the wrong side of the law. Their initial eagerness to be outlaws soon abates, however, when the boys are confronted with the realities of preying on others in a nation ravaged by war and exploitation. The film is often credited with inspiring the name of the classic rock band of the seventies Bad Company which according to Paul Rodgers (the band's lead singer) is incorrect and the name is in fact taken from an illustration in a Victorian book of morals he once perused.

== Plot ==
A group of soldiers pulls up to a modest white house and goes inside. Moments later, they exit, dragging a boy in a dress who is frantically resisting them. The soldiers throw the boy in a wagon with other boys, one of whom is also dressed as a woman to avoid conscription. At the Dixon home, the soldiers search for Drew despite his mother's protest. She explains that she has already lost one son to the war. When the soldiers leave, Drew emerges from his hiding place. Mrs. Dixon and her husband Joe give Drew $100 and urge him to go West, giving him their picture and his brother's watch as mementos.

In St. Joseph, Missouri, Drew is approached by Jake Rumsey who pistol-whips him and takes some of his money in an alley. Jake runs a gang of petty thieves who steal purses and rob children of their pocket change. While Drew is recovering at a minister Reverend Clum's house, Jake arrives to return the purse that one of his gang stole from the minister's wife Mrs. Clum, hoping to collect a reward. Once inside, he purloins various household items until Drew sees him and attacks, demanding his money back. After a long struggle, Jake finally bests Drew and convinces him that he has no choice but to join his gang.

Jake introduces Drew to his gang of thieves: the brothers Jim Bob and Loney Logan, Arthur Simms, and the ten-year-old Boog Bookin. Loney demands that Drew demonstrate his worth by committing a robbery and bringing in some money. Drew agrees and claims to have robbed a hardware store, when in fact he simply took $12 from his boot where he is hiding his parents' money.

The gang heads West, hoping to improve their fortunes. At night, Drew reads to everyone from Jane Eyre. When they spy a rabbit, all six of them shoot at it, barely managing to kill it. Jake orders Boog to clean the rabbit, but Boog declines. Jake is stunned to realize that no one in the gang knows how to clean the rabbit. He demonstrates how to do it, but his barely contained disgust reveals that he is skinning his first rabbit. The next day, a settler and his wife Min are returning from the West, where they went bust. The settler offers Min to all six boys for $10. Drew declines, citing his morals.

The following morning, Big Joe and his thugs, led by Hobbs, come upon the boys while they are still asleep. During the robbery, Jake aims his gun at Big Joe, but doesn't have the nerve to fire. Flat broke, the gang tries unsuccessfully to mount a string of robberies, which results in Arthur running away with a stagecoach (which he was supposed to be robbing) and Boog being shot and killed while running with a pie stolen from a window sill.

The gang finally disintegrates for good when the Logan brothers rob Jake and Drew, taking his brother's watch and the horses. Left with only a mule, Jake and Drew wander aimlessly. Eventually, they come across the Logan brothers' corpses hanging from a tree. Big Joe's gang has killed them, and as Jake and Drew bury their bodies, Hobbs leads the thugs to attack them, despite Big Joe's warning that they would bungle the job. Sure enough, Jake and Drew manage to kill all four thugs, and as Drew leans over Hobbs to retrieve his watch, he reveals a hole in his boot. Jake sees a $10 bill through the hole and realizes that Drew had lied about robbing the hardware store. He pistol-whips Drew again and takes the money.

When Drew awakens, he wanders alone, swearing that he'll kill Jake if he ever sees him again. Seeing smoke on the horizon, he investigates, only to find that it was the result of a burning barn, set afire during a raid by Big Joe. Before he is hanged for taking part in the raid, one of Joe's men confirms to Drew that Jake has joined up with the gang. Drew joins the posse in order to get his revenge on Jake.

The posse captures Big Joe's gang, and as Drew guards Jake, he realizes how guilty he is by lying about his money. Jake offers to split $1,000 that the gang has buried. Drew helps him escape during the night, but after a few days of riding, he realizes that there is no buried money. Jake assumes that Drew will kill him, but Drew swears instead to stick with Jake until he has repaid every cent that he owes Drew.

In the final scene, as they approach a town, Jake asks Drew, "So how'd that Jane Eyre turn out in the end?" Drew replies, "Fine. Just fine." The two boys walk into the Wells Fargo and rob it.

== Cast ==
- Jeff Bridges as Jake Rumsey
- Barry Brown as Drew Dixon
- Jim Davis as Marshal
- David Huddleston as Joe "Big Joe"
- John Savage as Loney
- Jerry Houser as Arthur Simms
- Damon Cofer as Jim Bob Logan
- Joshua Hill Lewis as "Boog" Bookin
- Geoffrey Lewis as Hobbs
- Raymond Guth as Jackson
- Ed Lauter as Orin
- John Quade as Nolan
- Jean Allison as Mrs. Dixon
- Ned Wertimer as Mr. Dixon
- Charles Tyner as Egg Farmer
- Ted Gehring as Zeb
- Claudia Bryar as Mrs. Clum
- John Boyd as Prisoner

== Critical reception ==
Film critic Roger Ebert liked the film and wrote, "The movie is built as a series of more-or-less self-contained episodes, and the episodes that work are worth the effort. But we get the feeling the movie doesn't know where it's headed and the last scene (one of those freeze-frames that's supposed to crystallize a significant moment for us) left me suspended in midair. If there were ever a movie that just plain stopped, instead of arriving at a conclusion, this is it. Still, there were some good moments along the trail."

Film critic Dennis Schwartz also liked the film and wrote, "Revisionist Western that questions heroes and America as the land of opportunity, as is the want [sic] of many hipster films from the turbulent 1970s. It's the directorial debut for the co-screenwriter with David Newman of Bonnie and Clyde (1967), Robert Benton (Kramer vs. Kramer/The Late Show/Nadine), who again teams with the writer Newman. I thought this was the best film Benton ever directed, including his Oscar-winning Kramer vs. Kramer, and he disappointed me by never coming close again to being as subversive and hard-hitting as he was in this film. The ironic comical Western prides itself in taking on the Horatio Alger myth by debunking the belief that going West would lead adventurers to the land of plenty, as it bitterly points out the harsh realities of life and that taking to the road will more than likely mean meeting with bad company and hardship rather than good company and fortune."

The film holds a rating of 84% from 25 reviews on Rotten Tomatoes with the consensus: "Well-acted and pleasantly gritty, Bad Company is one of the more authentic Westerns of its era -- and an auspicious debut for director Robert Benton."

== See also ==
- List of American films of 1972
