= Castle of Frankenstein =

American magazine

Castle of Frankenstein is an American horror, science fiction and fantasy film magazine first published between 1962 and 1975 by Calvin Thomas Beck's Gothic Castle Publishing Company, distributed by Kable News. Larry Ivie—who also was cover artist for several early issues—and Ken Beale edited the first three issues. Writer-artist Bhob Stewart edited the magazine from 1963 into the early 1970s. Although promoted and sold as a "monster magazine," readers were aware that Castle of Frankenstein, at the time, was the only nationally distributed magazine devoted to a legitimate and serious coverage of B movies. In addition to its central focus on classic and current horror films, Castle of Frankenstein also devoted pages to amateur filmmakers and fanzines. Its advertising pages sold full-length silent feature films such as The Lost World and The Golem: How He Came into the World.

== History ==
Following employment as an editor for publisher Joe Weider, Calvin Beck (1929–1989) entered the monster magazine arena in 1959 with his one-shot issue Journal of Frankenstein, which featured John Zacherle on the cover and had a small circulation. As an experiment, Beck printed part of the run on slick paper. After a hiatus and a title change, Beck returned with Castle of Frankenstein #1 in 1962.

Beck claimed that since his magazine carried no outside advertising, a standardized schedule was unneeded. Issues were published whenever they were completed, leading to an erratic, irregular schedule. Distribution also varied; while many well-stocked periodical outlets did not carry the magazine, some less-likely outlets (such as grocery stores) did.

The magazine ran 25 issues, plus one annual (the 1967 Fearbook); the final issue of this initial run was published in 1975.

In 1999, publisher Dennis Druktenis revived both Castle of Frankenstein (releasing 10 more issues) and the original title Journal of Frankenstein (releasing five more issues).

== 2021 ==
In 2021, publishers Don and Vicki Smeraldi once again revived "Castle of Frankenstein," issuing #36 in October, with plans to release new issues twice a year every spring and fall. In 2024, the Smeraldis were inducted into the Rondo Hatton Classic Horror Awards' Monster Kid Hall of Fame.

== Contributors ==
In addition to book reviews by Charles Collins and Lin Carter, contributors included Barry Brown, Richard A. Lupoff and William K. Everson.

Inspired by the ratings and reviews of films in Cahiers du Cinéma, Stewart introduced a similar system with the "Comic Book Council". Commentary and ratings of underground comics were juxtaposed with reviews of mainstream comics. Another feature was the "Frankenstein Movieguide", an attempt to document all fantastic films seen on television with capsule reviews written by Joe Dante and Stewart. Included were experimental and foreign art films.

With new art and reprints of vintage fantasy art, the magazine published such artists as Aubrey Beardsley, Hannes Bok, Harry Clarke, Virgil Finlay, Jim Steranko, Wally Wood and Weird Tales illustrator Matt Fox. Color photos rather than paintings were used on the covers of issues 6-14. With issue 11's cover photo of Leonard Nimoy, Castle of Frankenstein was the first magazine to feature Star Trek as a major cover story. Other issues displayed cover paintings by Robert Adragna, Marcus Boas, Bok, Frank Brunner, Maelo Cintron, Larry Ivie, Russ Jones, Ken Kelly, Los Angeles painter Tom Maher and Lee Wanagiel.

Interior art included graphic stories by Ivie, Brunner, Bernie Wrightson and the team of Marv Wolfman and Len Wein, plus the first published comics page by Marvel artist-writer-editor Larry Hama. Castle of Frankenstein also carried an original comic strip, Baron von Bungle by Richard Bojarski, which gave a humorous twist to the world depicted in Universal horror films.

== Books ==
Calvin Beck edited this anthology for Ballantine Books in 1962.

Beck, with an editorial assist by fantasy fiction scholar Haywood P. Norton, assembled the paperback anthology The Frankenstein Reader (Ballantine Books, 1962). The book republished vintage horror-fantasy tales by E. F. Benson, Ambrose Bierce, Robert W. Chambers, Ralph Adams Cram, Charles Dickens, Amelia B. Edwards, Katharine Fullerton Gerould, Richard Middleton, Sir Arthur Quiller-Couch, Robert Louis Stevenson and H. G. Wells.

In Heroes of the Horrors (Macmillan, 1975), Beck wrote illustrated biographies of six leading horror film stars (Lon Chaney Sr., Lon Chaney Jr., Boris Karloff, Peter Lorre, Bela Lugosi, Vincent Price) and writers such as Robert Bloch and Richard Matheson. The book reworked information previously published in Castle of Frankenstein articles.

Bhob Stewart and Beck then collaborated on Scream Queens: Heroines of the Horrors (Macmillan, 1978), containing illustrated biographical profiles of 29 fantasy film actresses and directors. The book included an article by actor Barry Brown, research by Drew Simels, and articles on Alice Guy-Blaché, Joan Crawford, Bette Davis, Veronica Lake, Elsa Lanchester, Agnes Moorehead, Mary Philbin, Barbara Steele, Vampira, Fay Wray and others. Scream Queens also incorporated material from the Castle of Frankenstein files of manuscripts and still photographs.

== See also ==
- Science fiction magazine
- Fantasy fiction magazine
- Horror fiction magazine
