= Marilyn Brown (actress) =

American actress (1953–1997)

- Born: Marilyn Louise Brown; March 9, 1953; San Jose, California, U.S.
- Died: July 28, 1998 (aged 45); Los Angeles, California, U.S.
- Occupation: Actress
- Years active: 1958–1976

Marilyn Louise Brown (March 9, 1953 – July 28, 1998) was an American actress who performed on stage and in television dramas and feature films. She was the sister of actor/author/playwright Barry Brown and author James Brown.

== Career ==
Marilyn and her brother Barry both made their film debuts in uncredited bit roles in the 1958 motion picture In Love and War. Brown had small roles in the lowbrow mid-70s drive-in exploitation comedies Chesty Anderson U.S. Navy and The Amorous Adventures of Don Quixote and Sancho Panza. Outside of her sparse movie credits, Marilyn also acted in a few off-off-Broadway stage productions.

== Personal life ==
Brown committed suicide at age 45 on July 28, 1998.

Her childhood and family life with her brother Barry were discussed in books by her younger brother James—Hot Wire (1985), Final Performance (1988), and The Los Angeles Diaries (2003).

== Films ==
- Chesty Anderson U.S. Navy (1976) - Barracks Girl
- The Amorous Adventures of Don Quixote and Sancho Panza (1976) - Maid
- In Love and War (1958)
