= Famous Monsters of Filmland =

American film magazine

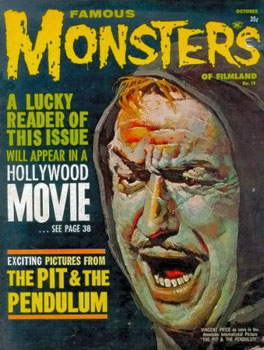
- Famous Monsters of Filmland #14, October 1961 issue. Cover illustration by Basil Gogos.
- Editor: Forrest J Ackerman
- Categories: Horror film, science fiction film magazine
- Frequency: Monthly, bi-monthly, annual
- Publisher: Warren Publishing, Self-Published
- First issue: February 1958
- Final issue Number: March 1983; 191 (Warren)
- Country: United States
- Based in: Philadelphia, Pennsylvania (Warren); New York City, New York (Warren); Santa Rosa, California (Kim)
- Language: English
- Website: famousmonsters.com

Famous Monsters of Filmland is an American genre-specific film magazine, started in 1958 by publisher James Warren and editor Forrest J Ackerman.

Famous Monsters of Filmland directly inspired the creation of many other similar publications, including Castle of Frankenstein, Cinefantastique, Fangoria, The Monster Times, and Video Watchdog. In addition, hundreds, if not thousands, of FM-influenced horror, fantasy and science fiction film-related fanzines have been produced, some of which have continued to publish for decades, such as Midnight Marquee and Little Shoppe of Horrors.

== Publication history ==
=== 1958–1983 ===
Famous Monsters of Filmland was originally conceived as a one-shot publication by Warren and Ackerman, published in the wake of the widespread success of the Shock Theater package of old horror movies syndicated to American television in 1957. The issue, published in February 1958, was so successful that it required a second printing to fulfill public demand, and a second issue was published eight months later. Its future as part of American culture was immediately obvious to both men. The success prompted spinoff magazines such as Spacemen, Favorite Westerns of Filmland/Wildest Westerns, Screen Thrills Illustrated, Creepy, Eerie, and Vampirella.

FM offered brief articles, well-illustrated with publicity stills and graphic artwork, on horror movies from the silent era to the current date of publication, their stars and filmmakers. Warren and Ackerman decided to aim the text at late pre-adolescents and young teenagers.

In the pages of FM, Forrest J Ackerman promoted the memory of Lon Chaney Sr., whose silent works were mostly beyond the accessibility of fans for most of the magazine's life, but were a great influence on his own childhood. He also introduced film fans to science fiction fandom through direct references, first-person experiences, and adoption of fandom terms and customs. The magazine regularly published photos from King Kong (1933), including one from the film's infamous "spider pit sequence", featured in Issue #108 (1974) which, until Ackerman discovered a photo of a spider in the cavern setting, had never been proven definitively to have actually been filmed.

FM's peak years were from its first issues through the late 1960s, when the disappearance of the older films from television and the decline of talent in the imaginative film industry left it with a dearth of subject matter acceptable to both editor and fan.

Warren and Ackerman created a jump in issue numbering from issue 69, which was printed in September 1970, to issue 80 in October 1970, because (according to the editorial in issue 80) it moved them closer to issue #100. Ackerman justified this in the editorial with "if, once upon a time, we had simply published 10 more numbers of FM instead of putting the same material in a companion magazine—Monster World—we would indeed by now have reached issue #80." This echoed the preface written by Warren in the November 1964 debut issue of Monster World, where he wrote "Now here's an Open Secret: for all practical purposes, FAMOUS MONSTERS and our brand new companion, MONSTER WORLD, are one and the same!", as well as "You asked for FAMOUS MONSTERS 12 times a year—now it's here!"

During the 1970s, the magazine came to rely heavily on reprints of articles from the 1960s. In the early 1980s, the magazine folded after Warren became ill and unable to carry on as publisher, and Ackerman resigned as editor in the face of the increasing disorganization within the leaderless Warren Publishing Company. The magazine stopped publication in 1983 after a run of 191 issues.

==== Convention ====
In November 1974 and November 1975, New York City was host to the "Famous Monsters Convention," a fan convention centered on FM, which featured such guests as Forrest J Ackerman, Verne Langdon, James Warren, Peter Cushing, Ingrid Pitt, Barbara Leigh, Catherine Lorre, Cal Floyd, and Sam Sherman. A similar gathering was held in 1995 in Los Angeles, with such guests as Maila Nurmi, Ray Harryhausen, John Landis, Joe Dante, Richard Matheson, Ray Bradbury, Curt Siodmak, Adam West, John Agar, Les Tremayne, Angus Scrimm, William Schallert, and Al Lewis.

=== Monsterland (1984–1987) ===
After Famous Monsters of Filmland ceased publication in 1983, Ackerman was coaxed into briefly resuming his title as editor of a horror-oriented magazine with Forrest J Ackerman's MONSTER LAND (with the official publication title inside as one all-caps word – "MONSTERLAND", and then "Monsterland" from 1986 onward) by Hal Schuster of New Media Publishing, which began publication in December 1984. After two fill-in editorials by Ackerman as "Editor & Chief" (beginning with issue #10 /1986), the cover title Forrest J Ackerman's MONSTER LAND was shortened to MONSTER LAND, and Ackerman's title changed to "Editor Emeritus" (with James Van Hise assigned as "Editor"). Inside that issue, host character "Evila" states that "Forry [had] moved on." After the end of New Media Publishing in 1985, beginning with issue #10 the magazine was published by a new Schuster publishing entity, Movieland Publishing, Inc., until the final issue, #17 (summer 1987).

=== Revival (1993–2008) ===
Famous Monsters of Filmland was resurrected in 1993 by New Jersey portrait photographer and monster movie fan Ray Ferry. After finding that the Famous Monsters of Filmland title had not been "maintained" under law, Ferry filed for "intent to use" for the magazine's trademark, unbeknownst to Ackerman or the trademark's owner and creator, Jim Warren. Ferry, poised to restart publication of FM on a quarterly basis, offered Ackerman the position of editor-in-chief for a fee of $2,500 per issue, which he accepted. Starting at issue #200, the new Famous Monsters acquired subscribers and over-the-counter buyers who believed they would be reunited with Ackerman in print. While Ferry tried to maintain Ackerman's style in his own writings, he heavily edited and rejected contributions from the man himself.

In an effort to help Ferry finance his full-time efforts on behalf of FM, Ackerman agreed to a reduced editor's fee of $1,500 per issue. With four consecutive unpaid issues and a continued rejection of his work, Ackerman resigned from his position. Aside from removing Ackerman's name from the masthead, Ferry did not inform FM readers that they were no longer reading material by, or authorized by, Ackerman. Instead, Ferry infused his writing with Ackerman's trademark puns, and mimicked his writing style, which led to legal action brought forth by Ackerman.

==== Libel lawsuit ====
In 1997, Ackerman filed a civil lawsuit against Ferry for libel, breach of contract, and misrepresentation; Ferry had publicly claimed that Ackerman's only connection with the new FM was as a hired hand and that Ferry “had to let Forry go” because he was no longer writing or editing for the magazine. Ferry also claimed rights to pen names and other personal properties of Ackerman. On May 11, 2000, the Los Angeles Superior Court jury decided in Ackerman's favor and awarded him $382,500 in compensatory damages and $342,000 in punitive damages. This verdict was appealed by Ferry, but the verdict was upheld by the Appellate Court of California, on November 12, 2002. With judgments in Ackerman's favor, Ferry filed for bankruptcy.

As of mid-2007, Ferry had been allowed to continue to publish issues of FM due to lack of efforts on the part of bankruptcy trustees and Ackerman's lawyers to force the sale of the trademark or personal assets attached to his income. Ferry had also failed to pay any of the $720,000-plus cash judgment against him.

=== 2008 to 2019 ===
In late 2007, Philip Kim, an entrepreneur and a private equity investor, purchased the rights to the logo and title, entering into an agreement with Ackerman to use his trademarks to retain the magazine's original look and feel. The new Famous Monsters of Filmland website was launched in May 2008 and on December 7, 2009, Kim announced the magazine's return to print. Ackerman died just before midnight on Thursday, December 4, 2008.

The revival of the classic horror magazine came in July 2010, with the publication of Famous Monsters of Filmland #251 at the Famous Monster Convention in Indianapolis, Indiana. The success of the print magazine at the Famous Monster Convention and Comic-Con International in San Diego yielded the announcement of the magazine's expansion in distribution and circulation into major bookstore chains and independent retailers throughout North America and select markets in the US, Canada, and UK. Publisher Movieland Classics, LLC announced concurrently that the magazine would be entering into a bi-monthly publication schedule to meet the significant increase in requests from readers beginning with Issue 253.

Editors changed in quick succession until the promotion of Ed Blair in 2011. As executive editor of the magazine, Blair steered FM to success starting with Issue 256 in 2011 through issue 282 in 2015, when the torch of editorial leadership was handed over to David Weiner, a 13-year veteran of the syndicated television program Entertainment Tonight. Weiner held the position through Issue 288.

In 2017, Famous Monsters transitioned to an annual print format with Issue 289, which saw longtime associate editor Holly Interlandi take the position of executive editor.

==== Awards & Imprints ====
In 2011, the new magazine's first Rondo Hatton Award (Best Interview of the Year) was awarded to A Talk with Haruo Nakajima conducted by author and Associate Editor August Ragone in Blair's first issue (#256). More Rondos followed for cover art, interviews, and articles under Blair's and later Weiner’s leadership. For Famous Monsters, Weiner also received a Best Interview of the Year for his interview with Mel Brooks for the 40th anniversary of Young Frankenstein in 2015. The magazine also won two consecutive Best Classic Magazine Rondos in 2015 and 2016.

In 2015, Famous Monsters launched American Gothic Press, a comic book publishing imprint, marking their first foray into comics since Forrest Ackerman co-created Vampirella.

== Pop-culture connections ==
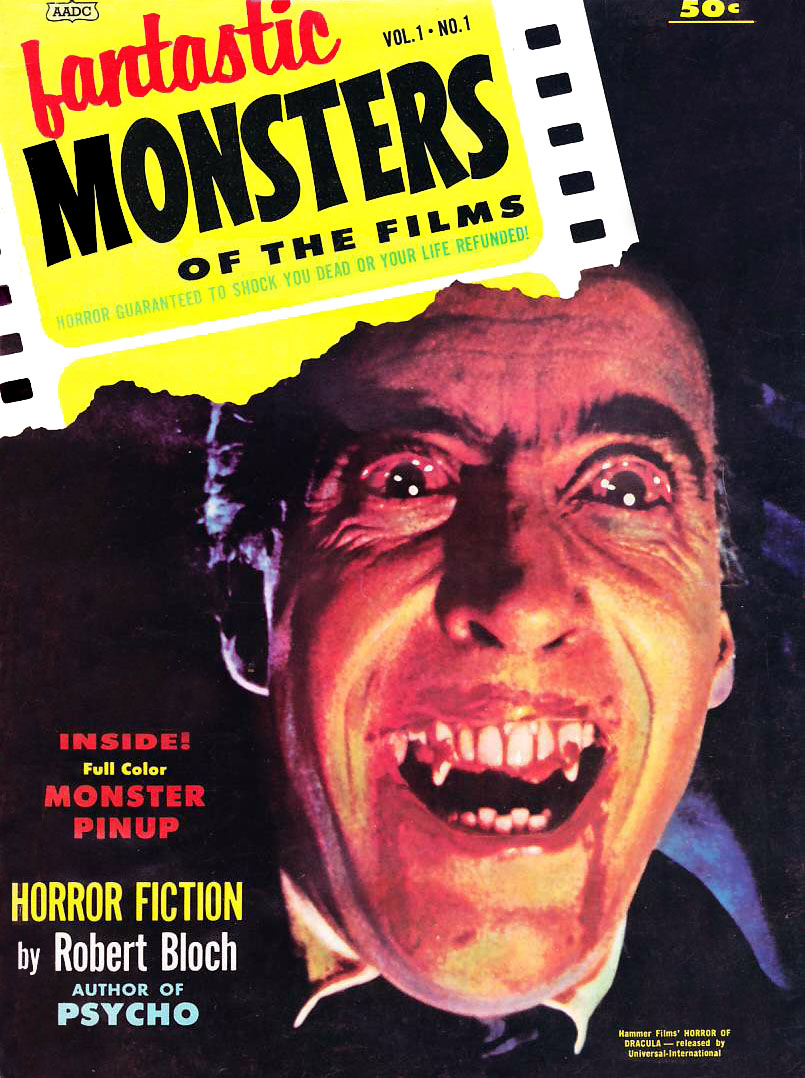
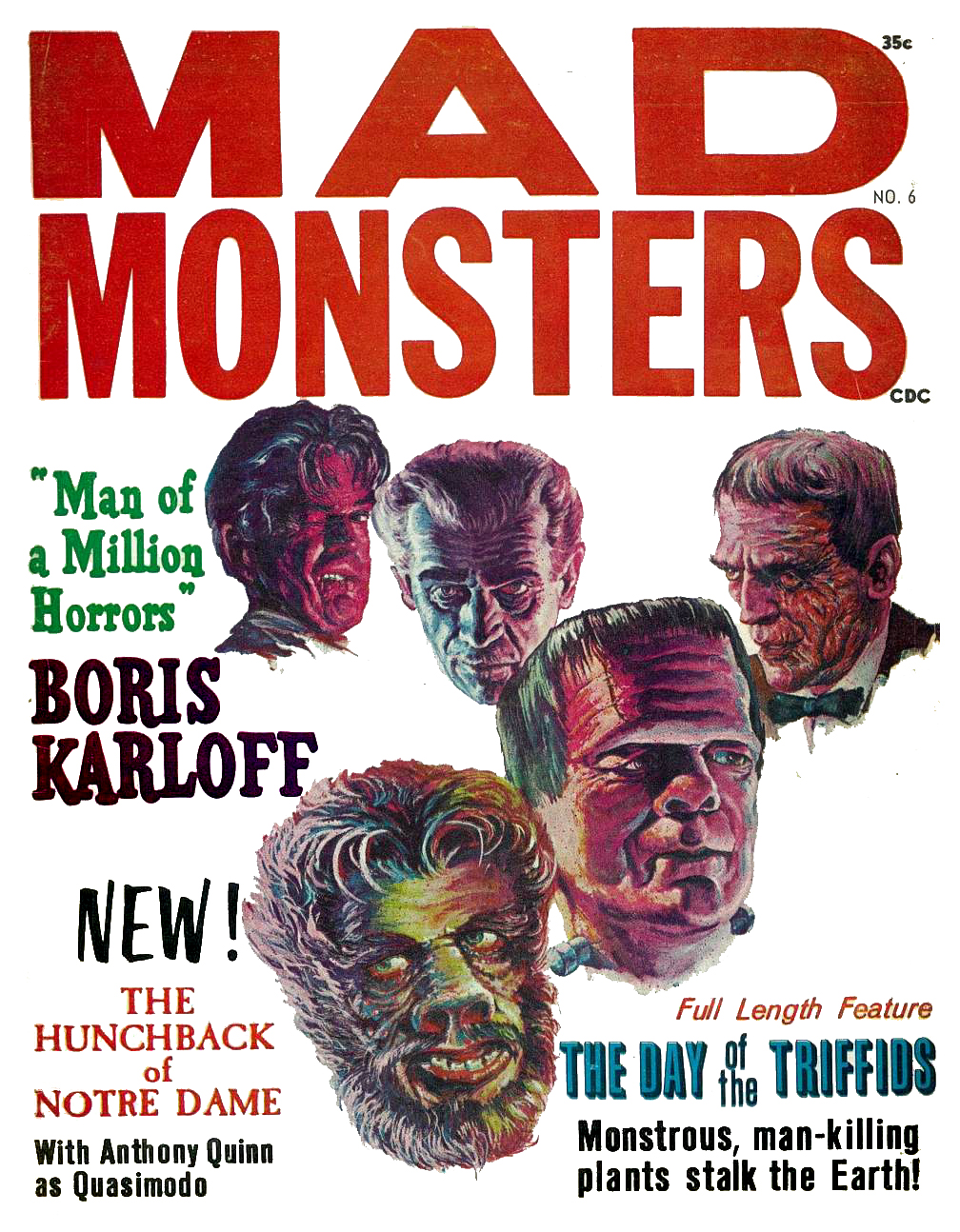
Famous Monsters of Filmland directly inspired the creation of many other similar publications.

In April 1981, the punk band The Misfits began using the magazine's distinctive logo font on most albums, T-shirts, and other associated promotional materials. In 1999, The Misfits released an album named Famous Monsters.

In his 2000 non-fiction book On Writing, Stephen King describes his own history with Ackerman's work and calls Famous Monsters of Filmland a life-changing publication, adding: "Ask anyone who has been associated with the fantasy–horror–science fiction genres in the last thirty years about this magazine, and you’ll get a laugh, a flash of the eyes, and a stream of bright memories—I practically guarantee it."

Famous Monsters was mentioned by Billy Bob Thornton in an infamous 2009 interview with host Jian Ghomeshi on the CBC Radio One program Q. Thornton; upset by Ghomeshi's mentioning his career in the film industry during the interview with The Boxmasters, he became non-responsive before relating a long story of how he read and entered a contest sponsored by FM when he was a boy.

The Sci-Fi Boys, a 2006 documentary by Paul Davids, focuses heavily on Famous Monsters and Forrest J Ackerman. The film features interviews with Ackerman and several of the current top names in the science fiction genre, including Peter Jackson and Rick Baker, who attest to the influence of the magazine and of Ackerman himself.

Writer and filmmaker Jason V. Brock created The Ackermonster Chronicles!, a 2012 documentary about Ackerman. The film has been shown at several venues (including a special screening at Loscon 39 in Los Angeles), and been critically well received in magazines such as Fangoria, Scary Monsters, and VideoScope. The movie is billed as the definitive film about Ackerman's life and cultural influence, and features in-depth interviews with Ackerman, Ray Bradbury, John Landis, Greg Bear, Richard Matheson, Dan O'Bannon, Ray Harryhausen, David J. Skal, and others.

== Reception ==
David Sanjek in Literature/Film Quarterly (1990) found that the magazine indulged in "wearisome punning" and that for all its good humor it was devoted to what James B. Twitchell described as "artificial horror". Twitchell described the term as "what an audience searches for in verbal or visual text when it wants a particular kind of frisson without much intellectual explanation or sophistication."

== See also ==
- Forrest J. Ackerman
- Castle of Frankenstein
- Cinefantastique
- Fangoria
- The Monster Times
- Rue Morgue (magazine)
- Scream (magazine)
- Vampirella
- Video Watchdog
