= Lawman Without a Gun =

1978 TV film by Jerrold Freedman

- Genre: Drama
- Written by: Jerrold Freedman
- Directed by: Jerrold Freedman
- Starring: Louis Gossett Jr. Clu Gulager; Mary Alice; Barry Brown
- Music by: Fred Karlin
- Country of origin: United States
- Original language: English

Production
- Executive producer: Abby Mann
- Producer: Harry R. Sherman
- Production location: Kentucky
- Cinematography: Tak Fujimoto
- Editor: John F. Link
- Running time: 90 minutes
- Production companies: EMI Television; Roger Gimbel Productions

Original release
- Network: BBC
- Release: December 4, 1978

Lawman Without a Gun (also known as This Man Stands Alone) is a 1978 American made-for-television drama film starring Louis Gossett Jr., written and directed by Jerrold Freedman. It premiered on the BBC on December 4, 1978. It was later shown on American television on NBC on May 30, 1979.

== Plot ==
A black man runs for the position of sheriff in a small town. This movie is about Dr. Rev. Thomas Earl Gilmore Sr. Raised in Forkland, Alabama and known as the "sheriff without a gun," he became the first black sheriff of Greene County and the second black sheriff in the state of Alabama. He died in 2015.

== Cast ==
- Louis Gossett Jr. as Tom Hayward
- Clu Gulager as Marvin Tayman
- Mary Alice as Minnie Hayward
- Barry Brown as Fred Tayman
- Barton Heyman as George Tayman
- James McEachin as Harris McIntyre
- Lonny Chapman as Sheriff Harvey Johnson
- Andy Griffith as Sheriff Andy Taylor cameo
