= Femme Fatales (magazine) =

American men's magazine

- Cover of the premiere issue of Femme Fatales, Summer 1992, featuring B-movie actress Brinke Stevens.
- Categories: Men's magazines, Film journals and magazines
- Frequency: Bi-monthly
- Circulation: 70,000
- Publisher: David E. Williams
- First issue: Summer 1992
- Final issue: Fall 2008
- Company: Femme Fatales Media
- Country: United States
- Language: English
- ISSN: 1062-3906

Femme Fatales was an American men's magazine focusing on film and television actresses. It was in circulation between 1992 and 2008.

== History and profile ==
Femme Fatales was founded by Frederick S. Clarke in the summer of 1992, as the sister publication to his science fiction film magazine Cinefantastique. Published by Clarke, it was originally edited by pin-up photography collector and expert Bill George. Cinefantastique contributor Dan Cziraky joined the staff as Associate Editor several months prior to its launch. It focused on science-fiction, fantasy, and horror actresses, from B-movies to Academy Award winners, featuring provocative non-nude photography pictorials, alongside extensive career interviews. It was unique in that it encouraged contributions from the actresses themselves, and featured articles penned by "scream queens" Brinke Stevens, Tina-Desiree Berg and Debbie Rochon, amongst others. Interviews with filmmakers that helped bolster the "scream queen" market, such as Andy Sidaris and Fred Olen Ray, were also featured. It was a publishing success, at one time producing an issue every three weeks. Cziraky left the magazine in 1994 over creative differences with George, and was replaced as associate editor by Rochon.

Clarke committed suicide in 2000, and for two years, both magazines were published by his widow, Celeste Casey Clarke. At the end of 2002, Femme Fatales was published bi-monthly, and had an unaudited circulation of 70,000. In 2002, Clarke contacted Mark A. Altman, the president and chief operating officer of Mindfire Entertainment, a film/TV writer and producer, the former editor-in-chief of Sci-Fi Universe and a regular contributor to both Cinefantastique and Femme Fatales, allowing Mindfire to take over their publication. David E. Williams, a former executive features editor at The Hollywood Reporter, became editor-in-chief of both publications. Both magazines' operations were moved from Chicago to Culver City.

Williams planned the 2003 revamp of Femme Fatales as a version of the men's magazine Maxim focusing on actresses in science fiction and horror films.

After a brief hiatus, Mark Gottwald took over publication and Femme Fatales began printing again at the end of 2007 as a bi-monthly magazine. The final issue of Femme Fatales was printed in September 2008 and featured Jolene Blalock on the cover.

Femme Fatales was purchased by Williams in 2010.

The magazine became the basis of the film noir-inspired TV series Femme Fatales, which aired on Cinemax from May 13, 2011 to August 10, 2012.

Mark A. Altman was the co-creator and executive producer of the show while Williams was credited as co-executive producer.
