= Barry Brown (actor) =

American actor and writer

- Brown (right) with Jeff Bridges photographed by Chris von Wangenheim shortly after they appeared together in Robert Benton's Bad Company (1972)
- Born: Donald Barry Brown; April 19, 1951; San Jose, California, U.S.
- Died: June 25, 1978 (aged 27); Silver Lake, Los Angeles, California, U.S.
- Occupations: Author, playwright, actor
- Years active: 1956–1978
- Spouse: Jennie Vlahos (m. 1972–1972)
- Relatives: Marilyn Brown (sister)

Donald Barry Brown (April 19, 1951 – June 25, 1978) was an American author, playwright and actor who performed on stage and in television dramas and feature films, notably as Frederick Winterbourne in Peter Bogdanovich's Daisy Miller (1974), adapted from the classic Henry James novella (1878). Bogdanovich praised Brown's contribution to the film, describing him as "the only American actor you can believe ever read a book."

== Early life ==
Born Donald Barry Brown in San Jose, California, he was the eldest child of Donald Bernard Brown and Vivian Brown (née Agrillo). His sister was the actress Marilyn Brown, who died by suicide in 1998 at the age of 45. His brother is the novelist James Brown (Final Performance, Hot Wire), who etched an intimate portrait of their dysfunctional family in his acclaimed memoir The Los Angeles Diaries, published by HarperCollins in 2003.

== Career ==
Brown began his acting career as a child of five and took part in many television and live performances. He appeared with Van Johnson in a stage production of The Music Man at the age of ten.

Brown was 19 when he made his first major screen appearance in Halls of Anger (1970), followed by The Great Northfield Minnesota Raid (1972) and his breakthrough role as the American Civil War draft dodger Drew Dixon in Robert Benton's critically acclaimed Bad Company (1972), co-starring with Jeff Bridges. The publicity and promotion for this film was capped by an article in Esquire introducing filmgoers to the "dashing, brooding Brown" in color photographs by Chris von Wangenheim, along with a text mention of Brown's obituary collection focusing on little-known and forgotten Hollywood personalities.

After playing opposite Cybill Shepherd in Daisy Miller, Brown concentrated on television throughout the 1970s, including the TV movie The Disappearance of Aimee (1976), about evangelist Aimee Semple McPherson, and numerous TV episodes. His final features were the crime drama The Ultimate Thrill (1974) and Joe Dante's Piranha (1978).

An authority on actors and film history, Brown was a contributor to Scream Queens: Heroines of the Horrors by Calvin Beck and Bhob Stewart. Published by Macmillan in 1978, the book features illustrated biographical profiles of 29 fantasy film actresses and directors. Brown did a similar survey, the unpublished Unsung Heroes of the Horrors, covering the lives of some lesser known Hollywood talents, and he also contributed to various magazines, including Films in Review and Castle of Frankenstein. The book Who Was Who on Screen Third Edition, by Evelyn Mack Truett was dedicated to Brown, whom she credited with giving data support for the previous edition.

== Personal life and death ==
Brown's marriage to Jennie Vlahos on March 4, 1972, ended in divorce May 1972. On June 27, 1978, Brown shot himself at his home in Los Angeles, California. He was cremated, and his ashes were scattered over the Chetco River.

== Filmography ==
Film
Year	Title	Role	Notes
1958	In Love and War	Minor Role	Uncredited
1970	Halls of Anger	Winger	
1972	Bad Company	Drew Dixon	
1972	Lapin 360	Howie	
1972	The Great Northfield Minnesota Raid	Henry Wheeler	
1972	Premonition	Mike	Alternative titles: The Impure; Head
1974	Daisy Miller	Frederick Winterbourne	
1974	The Ultimate Thrill	Joe Straker	Alternative title: The Ultimate Chase
1978	Piranha	Trooper	
Television
Year	Title	Role	Notes
1969–1970	The Mod Squad	Don Jennings; Dana Sterling	2 episodes
1970	Then Came Bronson	Len Tayman	1 episode
1970	The Bold Ones: The Senator	Steve Lascoe	1 episode
1970	Ironside	Charles Borrow	1 episode
1970	Matt Lincoln		1 episode
1970	Gunsmoke	Jared Sprague	1 episode
1970	The Psychiatrist: God Bless the Children	Fritz	Television movie
1970–1971	Marcus Welby, M.D.	Greg Wells Jr.	3 episodes
1971	Night Gallery	Archie Dittman Jr.	1 episode
1971	The Birdmen	Donnelly	ABC Movie of the Week
1972	The Bravos	Garratt	Television movie
1974	Rhoda	Jimmy Klein	1 episode
1975–1976	Insight	Brother Francis; Keith Forman	2 episodes
1975	Joe Forrester	Jamie Herron	1 episode
1976	Barnaby Jones	Cory Doyle	1 episode
1976	Police Woman	Scott Swanson	1 episode
1976	The Disappearance of Aimee	Wallace Moore	Television movie
1977	Testimony of Two Men	Howard Best	Television miniseries
1978	Lawman Without a Gun	Fred Tayman	Television movie (final film role)
