= James Brown (author) =

American novelist

- Born: Santa Clara, California, U.S.
- Education: San Francisco State University; University of California, Irvine (MFA)
- Occupation: Novelist
- Spouse: Paula Priamos-Brown
- Relatives: Barry Brown (brother); Marilyn Brown (sister)
- Writing career
- Genres: Fiction; non-fiction

James Brown is an American novelist who has also written short fiction and nonfiction. He is known for his trilogy of memoirs, The Los Angeles Diaries (2003), This River (2011), and Apology to the Young Addict

== Early life and education ==
Living in San Jose, Brown studied creative writing at San Francisco State University and then attended the University of California, Irvine where he received an MFA degree in creative writing.

== Career ==
His first novel, Going Fast, published in a limited edition by Border Mountain Press, was reviewed by Merritt Clifton in Samisdat.

His second novel, Hot Wire, focuses on the struggles of a waitress and her three sons. The semi-autobiographical Final Performance (Sceptre, 1988), about two brothers in Los Angeles, was reviewed in Library Journal by Kimberly G. Allen, who commented, "Its characters imbued with an honest emotional depth, this work is compelling and profoundly moving."

He followed with The Second Story Theatre and Two Encores (Story Line collecting together a novella and short stories, "The Rat Boy" and "The Friend." His novel Lucky Town (Harcourt, follows a young boy who runs away from a foster home to meet his ex-con father.

Brown's acclaimed first memoir, The Los Angeles Diaries (HarperCollins, 2003), is an intimate portrait of his dysfunctional family, covering his childhood, Hollywood script meetings, his splintered marriage and life with his older brother, the actor Barry Brown (1951–78), and his sister, the actress Marilyn Brown (1953–97), who both committed suicide. It was named a Best Book of the Year by Publishers Weekly, The San Francisco Chronicle and The Independent of London. Brown and Patrick O'Neil co-authored, Writing Your Way to Recovery: How Stories Can Save Our Lives, a book on utilizing creative writing techniques in the drug and alcohol recovery community.

This River (Counterpoint Books, 2011) is a continuation of The Los Angeles Diaries, picking up where the first memoir ended with many of the same themes of family, addiction and recovery.

His third memoir, Apology to the Young Addict, is the last of a trilogy dealing with addiction, recovery, and helping others achieve sobriety.

His personal essays have appeared in GQ, The New York Times Magazine, The Los Angeles Times Magazine and Ploughshares. His writing has also been featured in Denver Quarterly and New England Review. He has been anthologized in Best American Sports Writing of 2006, Fathers and Sons and Sports: An Anthology of Great American Sports Writing (ESPN, 2008).

== Awards and honors ==
Brown received the Nelson Algren Award for Short Fiction, a National Endowment for the Arts Fellowship in fiction writing and a Chesterfield Film Writing Fellowship from Universal/Amblin Entertainment.

He was a visiting fellow at the Bread Loaf Writers' Conference and the Sewanee Writers' Conference.

== Bibliography ==
- Going Fast (Border Mountain Press, 1977)
- Hot Wire (Arbor House, 1985)
- Final Performance (Sceptre, 1988)
- The Second Story Theatre and Two Encores (Story Line Press, 1994)
- Lucky Town (Harcourt, 1994)
- The Los Angeles Diaries (HarperCollins, 2003)
- This River (Counterpoint Books, 2011)
- Apology to the Young Addict (Counterpoint Books, 2020)
- Writing Your Way to Recovery: How Stories Can Save Our Lives (co-authored with Patrick O'Neil, 2021)
