= Basil Gogos =

American illustrator (1929–2017)

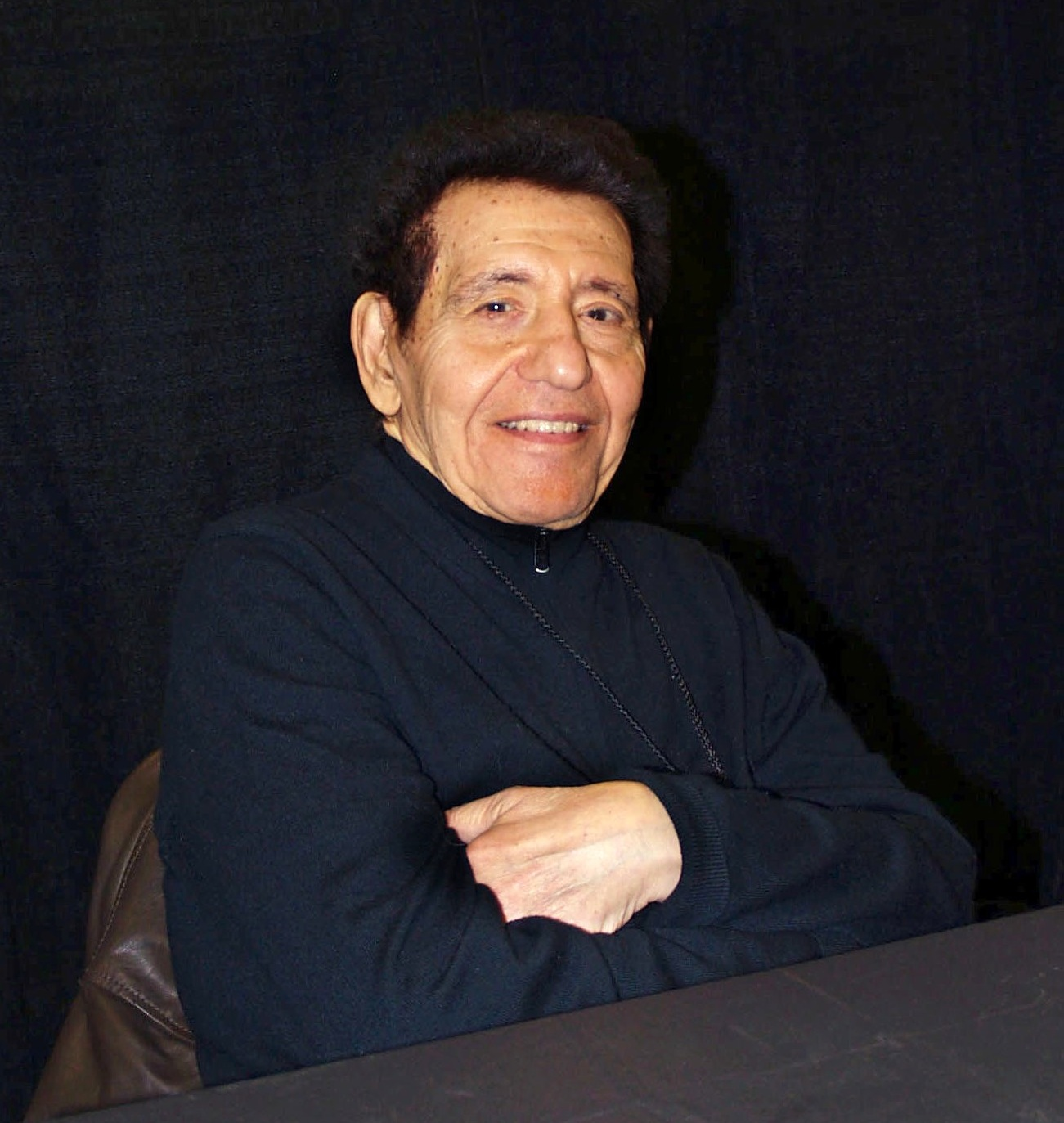
- Gogos at the 2015 East Coast Comicon in Secaucus, New Jersey
- Born: March 12, 1929; Alexandria, Kingdom of Egypt
- Died: September 13, 2017 (aged 88); Manhattan, New York
- Known for: Painting and drawing
- Notable work: Famous Monsters of Filmland
- Awards: Monster Kid Hall Of Fame Rondo Hatton Classic Horror Awards

Basil Gogos (Note: Pronounced /ˈɡoʊɡoʊs/ GOH-gohss) (March 12, 1929 – September 13, 2017) was an Egyptian-American illustrator best known for his portraits of movie monsters which appeared on the covers of Famous Monsters of Filmland magazine in the 1960s and 1970s.

== Early life ==
Basil Gogos was born to a Greek family living in Egypt. Gogos was 16 years old when he and his family immigrated to the U.S. Interested in art from a young age, Gogos spent his early adult years working at various jobs and studying art periodically with the goal of eventually becoming a fine artist. Gogos attended several New York area schools including The National School of Design, The Phoenix School of Design and The School of Visual Arts. While attending the Art Students League of New York, Gogos had his greatest artistic growth studying with noted illustrator Frank J. Reilly. After winning a competition at the school sponsored by Pocket Books, Gogos began his professional career with the cover painting for a western paperback novel called Pursuit published in 1959.

== Career ==
During the 1960s, Gogos provided a steady stream of illustrations for a variety of New York-based publications. The majority of his work during this period was for men's adventure magazines for which he painted many scenes of World War II battles, jungle perils, and crime as well as cheesecake portraits of beautiful women. However, Gogos' greatest impact as an illustrator was the work he did for Warren Publishing.

Famous Monsters of Filmland magazine, created by publisher James Warren and editor Forrest J Ackerman, premiered in 1958 and was aimed at young readers who were then discovering the classic horror films of the 1930s and 1940s on television. The magazine's covers were usually eye-catching close-ups of horror movie characters. Gogos' first work for Warren was the cover of Famous Monsters of Filmland #9 (November 1960) featuring a portrait of Vincent Price from House of Usher painted in shades of red, yellow and green. Over the next two decades, he created almost 50 covers for Famous Monsters, many of which have become iconic images of that period. Gogos also provided cover art for several other Warren magazines including Creepy, Eerie, Spacemen, Wildest Westerns, and The Spirit.

Gogos' Famous Monsters cover art featured most of the classic horror characters such as the Phantom of the Opera, Frankenstein's monster, Count Dracula, the Wolf Man, the Mummy, King Kong, Godzilla, and the Creature from the Black Lagoon and popular horror actors like Boris Karloff, Bela Lugosi, Vincent Price, Lon Chaney, Christopher Lee, and Peter Cushing. Gogos often captured his subjects in an array of vivid colors using a technique in which the artist imagined the character bathed in colors from multiple light sources. He enjoyed painting monsters more than most of his more conventional assignments because of the "freedom" he was given and because of the challenge of painting such unusual characters which he endeavored to portray as both frightening and sympathetic.

In the late 1970s, Gogos gave up full-time commercial illustration to devote himself more to his original goal of doing fine art. He produced personal art pieces in watercolor and other media, while earning his livelihood as a photo retouch artist in the ad department of United Artists. While there, he also did occasional illustrations for movie posters. Gogos later moved into advertising where he produced presentation sketches and storyboards for commercials for a major advertising agency.

Due to a resurgence of interest in classic horror films and collectibles, Gogos returned to the horror genre in the 1990s. During this time, new Gogos monster portraits appeared on trading cards, lithographs, and the covers of Monsterscene magazine. He has also painted album covers for rock stars Rob Zombie, The Misfits, and Electric Frankenstein.

In 2006, Vanguard Productions published the coffee table book, Famous Monster Movie Art of Basil Gogos by Kerry Gammill and J. David Spurlock.

Gogos' career, especially his work for Famous Monsters is the subject of a docuseries by Bill Diamond Productions. The series is entitled Basil Gogos: King of the Monsters and includes interviews with Gogos and others such as Warren, Ackerman, Bob Burns, and Victoria Price.

== Death ==
Gogos died in Manhattan on September 13, 2017, at age 88.

== Awards ==
In 2006, Gogos was inducted to the Monster Kid Hall Of Fame at the Rondo Hatton Classic Horror Awards for his contributions to the field of classic horror. He was awarded the Inkpot Award in 2006.
