= Verne Langdon =

American actor and singer (1941–2011)

- Born: Vernon Loring Langdon; September 15, 1941; Oakland, California, U.S.
- Died: January 1, 2011 (aged 69); Arizona, U.S.
- Resting place: Valhalla Memorial Park Cemetery
- Occupations: Mask maker; Magician; Musician; Circus clown; Make-up artist; Wrestler
- Relatives: Red Nichols (uncle)
- Website: vernelangdon.com

Vernon Loring "Verne" Langdon (September 15, 1941 – January 1, 2011) was an American mask maker, musician, magician, circus clown, make-up artist, and wrestler. He was also a member of the American Society of Composers, Authors and Publishers.

== Biography ==
Born in Oakland, California, Langdon was known in cult monster mask circles as the creative force behind the Don Post Studios "Calendar Masks" (1963 to 1968). He was also the creator of the most sought-after collector's mask, "The Zombie", and was creator-producer of the cult classic Decca LP An Evening With Boris Karloff And His Friends. With Jay Stein and Terry Winnick he created The Land of a Thousand Faces Makeup Show in 1975 and the Castle Dracula horror show in 1980 for Universal Studios Tour, Hollywood, California. He has produced, written, performed and recorded thirty one albums for two record labels, Electric Lemon Record Co., and Dejavu Record Company. His most recent album was released on March 16, 2009, Jonathan Winters – A Very Special Time. The nineteen-track, spoken-word album, featured memorial tracks with all music composed by Verne Langdon.

Langdon was a member of the American Society of Composers, Authors and Publishers. He was a special guest of the Monsterpalooza – The Art of Monsters on April 9, 2010, in The Marriott Burbank Airport Hotel in Burbank, California.

Langdon died, at the age of 69, on January 1, 2011.
