= Matt Fox (comics) =

American illustrator and comic book artist

- Born: November 8, 1906; New York City, New York, U.S.
- Died: February 20, 1988 (aged 81); West Haven, Connecticut, U.S.
- Occupation: Pulp magazine artist
- Known for: cover art for Weird Tales

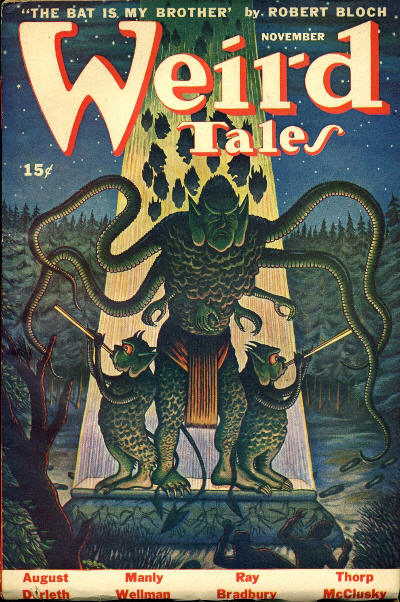
Matt Fox cover for Weird Tales, November 1944

Marcy Matthew Fox (November 8, 1906 – February 20, 1988), best known as Matt Fox, was an American illustrator and comic book artist. Fox notably illustrated the covers for the horror pulp magazine Weird Tales from 1943 to 1951. He also contributed art to other pulps, including Crack Detective, Famous Fantastic Mysteries, and Planet Stories. In the 1950s and 1960s he worked for Atlas Comics, contributing inking and penciling to comics publications like Journey into Mystery, World of Fantasy, Tales of Suspense and Journey into Unknown Worlds and for Youthful Comics on Chilling Tales

Marcy Matthew Fox was born in New York City on November 8, 1906, to Morris and Minnie (née Flesche) Fox.

Fox was much older than most of his colleagues, and his comics are noted for their large amount of detail, and stiff "Victorian woodcut" style.

Fox never gave an interview and his only public statement was his own entry for the 1973 edition of Who's Who of American Comics. In it, he names Alex Raymond as his only influence and lists "lithographs, water colors, color woodcuts, oils and etchings" as his other mediums. Fox's last known published work is an advertisement, printed in 1967, for original mail-order glow-in-the-dark posters. Two of his comics appear in the 2010 book Art in Time, a collection of works by "unheralded" comics artists who worked between 1940 and 1980.

Fox moved to Norfolk, Connecticut, in 1968, and lived there until the end of his life. Fox died after a long illness at West Haven Veterans' Administration Hospital in West Haven, Connecticut, on February 20, 1988, and was buried at Bethel Cemetery in Woodbridge, New Jersey.
