= Frederick S. Clarke =

American magazine publisher and editor

- Born: 1949; Steubenville, Ohio, U.S.
- Died: October 17, 2000 (aged 50–51); Adair County, Iowa, U.S.
- Education: University of Illinois at Chicago
- Occupations: Magazine publisher, editor, writer
- Known for: Founder and editor of Cinefantastique
- Spouse: Celeste Casey Clarke
- Children: 2

Frederick S. Clarke (1949 – October 17, 2000) was an American magazine publisher, editor, graphic artist and writer. He is best known as the founder of the film periodical Cinefantastique which specialized in science fiction, fantasy and horror cinema.

== Early life ==
Clarke was born in Steubenville, Ohio, in 1949. A long-time admirer of science fiction films, his interest began after seeing When Worlds Collide (1951) as a child. He earned a bachelor's degree in physics from the University of Illinois, where he also studied quantum mechanics.

== Career ==
While still a student, Clarke began publishing Cinefantastique as a mimeographed newsletter produced in his mother's attic. In 1970 he launched the magazine in glossy form with a small initial circulation of about 1,000 copies, which eventually grew to 30,000. Clarke was noted for his insistence on editorial independence, declining studio advertising to preserve objectivity. His detailed coverage of film production and critical analyses set Cinefantastique apart from contemporary fan publications and influenced later genre magazines such as Starlog, Cinefex and Fangoria.

He later created several other magazines, including Femme Fatales in 1992, which focused on actresses in genre cinema, as well as Imagi-Movies and AnimeFantastique.

== Later life and death ==
Clarke lived in Oak Park, Illinois, where his wife Celeste Casey Clarke served as business manager of his publications. He suffered from depression and died by suicide on October 17, 2000, in Adair County, Iowa. He was survived by his wife, two daughters and two stepchildren.
