= Wonder Festival =

Semiannual event held in Japan

The Wonder Festival (ワンダーフェスティバル), or Wonfes (ワンフェス, Wanfesu), is a semiannual (February and August) event held in the Makuhari Messe, in Chiba, Japan. It is sponsored by the Kaiyodo manufacturing company. The main focus is to display and sell "garage kits", which are sculptures that usually represent not only anime and game characters, but also popular mecha/sci-fi characters and creatures such as Kuratas. These models are extremely detail oriented, and many of these sculptures appear in very small quantities due to the amateur nature of their reproduction. Unusually skilled artisans are promoted specifically during the "wonder showcase" (WSC), in which their works are given special attention and limited quantities of their masterpieces are sold for high prices to avid collectors. It also showcases future releases by major toy companies.

== See also ==
- WonderFest
