= Monsterpalooza =

American multigenre convention

Coordinates: 34.1808°N 118.3090°W

- Status: Active
- Genre: Horror, Multi-genre
- Locations: Los Angeles, California
- Country: United States
- Website: http://www.monsterpalooza.com/

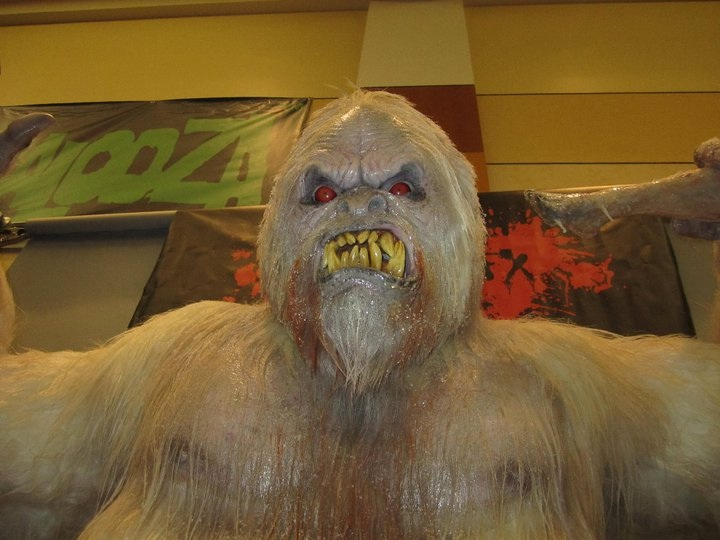
Display of the Abominable Snowman creature at Monsterpalooza 2011

Monsterpalooza is an American multigenre convention focusing on horror, creatures and makeup work. The convention takes place every spring in Los Angeles County, California, most recently in the Pasadena Convention Center. A smaller offshoot convention, "Son of Monsterpalooza" is held in Burbank in the fall.

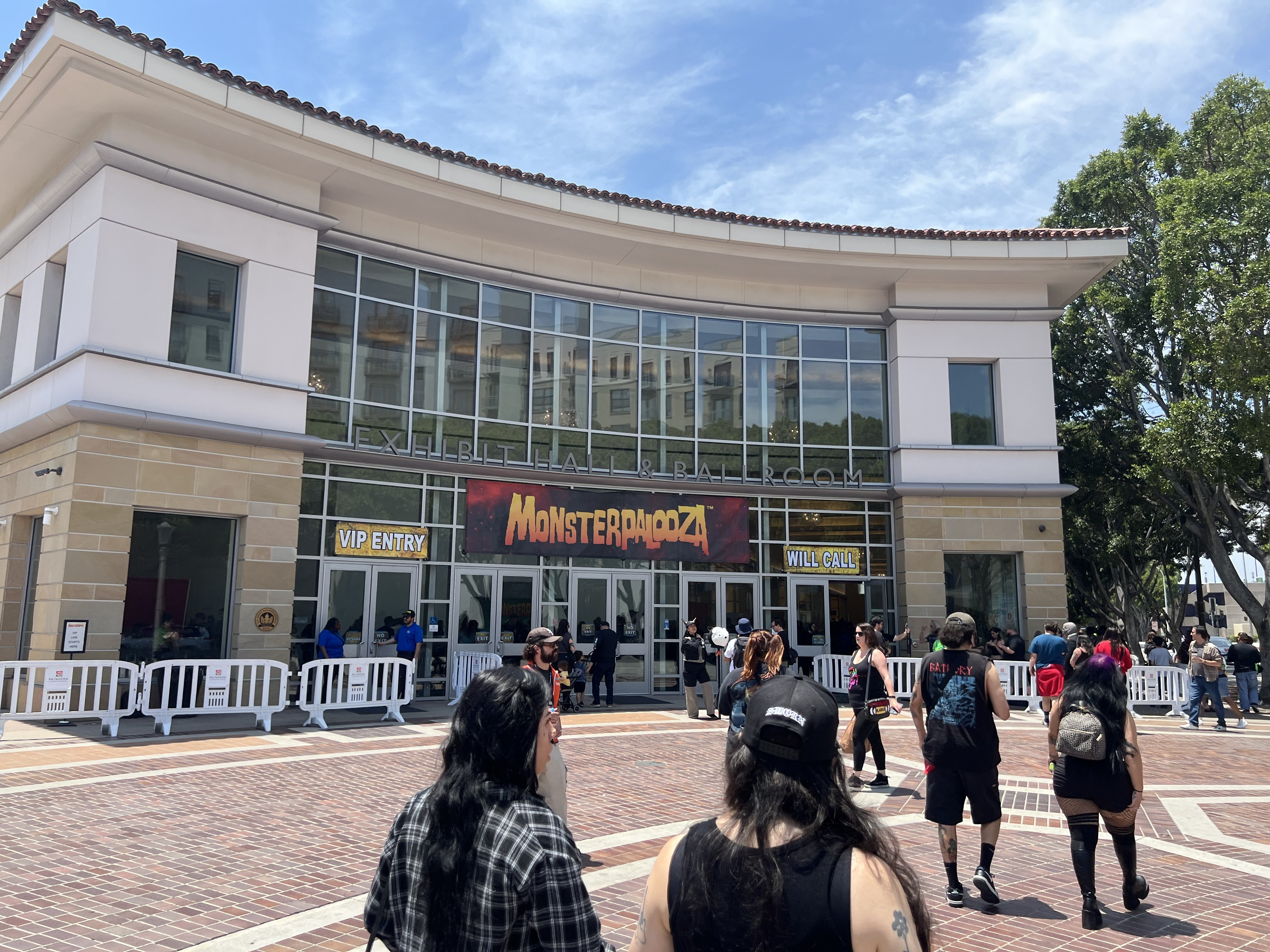
Pasadena Convention Center, while hosting Monsterpalooza in 2025.

== History ==
After a successful trial run in New Jersey in 2008, Monsterpalooza was organized on the West Coast by Eliot Brodsky in 2009, and held at the Marriott Burbank Convention Center. It has been held annually since then, and usually takes place in March, April or May. The spring event moved from Burbank to the Pasadena Convention Center in 2016, and became the venue's most attended event. A smaller offshoot convention, "Son of Monsterpalooza" is still held in Burbank in September. Monsterpalooza is the longest running, independently operated horror convention in California.

== Programming ==
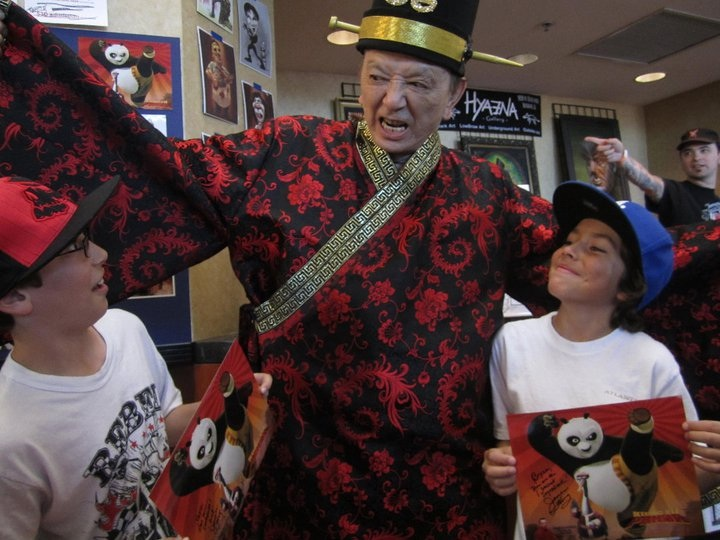
James Hong at Monsterpalooza 2011, dressed as David Lo Pan from Big Trouble in Little China.

Convention programming includes presentations, panels, and workshops. The spring Monsterpalooza event features a museum which displays screen-used props, masks, life-size figures and movie creatures from participating Hollywood FX studios and artists. Workshops focus on the craft; makeup demonstrations and creature effects. The emphasis is on classic horror, including characters from B movies of Hollywood's Golden Age and modern horror, science fiction and fantasy films. Panels have included behind the scenes looks at films such as The Shape of Water, The Predator, Godzilla: King of the Monsters, Alien Romulus, Terrifier, as well as attractions such as Halloween Horror Nights and more.

Over the years, Monsterpalooza has hosted a myriad of famous actors, musicians and industry personalities, including Robert Englund, Bruce Campbell, Ozzy Osbourne, Geezer Butler & Bill Ward (musician), Neve Campbell, Matthew Lillard, Skeet Ulrich, Alice Cooper, Corey Taylor from Slipknot (band), Ron Perlman, Selma Blair, Doug Jones (actor), Giancarlo Esposito, Cassandra Peterson, Michael Dougherty, Kane Hodder, Jennifer Tilly, George A. Romero, Martin Landau, James Remar, Sonny Chiba, and Linda Blair.

== Reception ==
Monsterpalooza draws tens of thousands of attendees and is also visited by various horror celebrities and others from the film industry. Director Guillermo del Toro said on his Twitter that Monsterpalooza is "the monster convention I dreamt could be possible as a kid". Director J. J. Abrams said in an article with CNN's Marquee Blog that Monsterpalooza "is a total blast". Brian Collins from Birth. Movies. Death. called it the "best horror convention of all".
