= Cinefantastique =

American film magazine

- Cover of the Winter 1977 issue (Vol. 6 No. 3) of Cinefantastique
- Editor: Frederick S. Clarke
- Categories: Film
- Frequency: Quarterly
- Founded: 1967 (first incarnation); 2009 (second incarnation)
- Final issue: 2006 (first incarnation)
- Company: Fourth Castle Micromedia
- Country: United States
- Based in: Forest Park, Illinois
- Language: English
- Website: cinefantastiqueonline.com
- ISSN: 0145-6032
- OCLC: 562755534

Cinefantastique is an American horror, fantasy, and science fiction film magazine.

== History ==
The magazine originally started as a mimeographed fanzine in 1967, then relaunched as a glossy, offset printed quarterly in 1970 by publisher and editor Frederick S. Clarke. Intended as a serious critical/review journal of the genres, the magazine immediately set itself apart from competitors like Famous Monsters of Filmland and The Monster Times due to its slick paper stock and use of full color interior film stills. Cinefantastique's articles and reviews emphasized an intelligent, near-scholarly approach, a then-unusual slant for such a genre-specific magazine. Advertisements were few, consisting mostly of other titles and materials by the publisher.

The magazine quickly came to be known for its lengthy, information-filled "retrospective" articles devoted to the full production details of such classic films as 1951's The Day the Earth Stood Still, George Pal's War of the Worlds, The Incredible Shrinking Man, and Planet of the Apes. Based on the popularity of these articles, Cinefantastique began producing huge double-issues centering on comprehensive "Making-Of" looks at such movies as Disney's 20,000 Leagues Under the Sea, Forbidden Planet, Star Wars, Close Encounters of the Third Kind, Blade Runner, and The Thing. The magazine also devoted multiple yearly issues to Star Trek films and Star Trek: The Next Generation, Star Trek: Deep Space Nine and Star Trek: Voyager. Many of the articles have since become accepted as the definitive source of production information regarding these and other genre titles.

The magazine was responsible for introducing the work of several writers who have continued to produce important work in the film field, including Don Shay, Bill Warren, Tim Lucas, Mick Garris, Stephen Rebello, Steven Rubin, Dan Scapperotti, Dale Winogura, Jeffrey Frentzen, Paul M. Sammon (who authored the Blade Runner double issue and later turned it into an extensive book called Future Noir), Dan Fiebiger, and Alan Jones.

On October 17, 2000, due to complications from long-time clinical depression, Clarke committed suicide at the age of 51. Editorship was briefly assumed by long-time contributor Dan Persons, then filmmaker and journalist Jason Paul Collum for a single issue, until rights to the continuing publication of Cinefantastique were acquired by Mark A. Altman's Mindfire Entertainment, who formally renamed the magazine CFQ.

In November 2006, CFQ editor Jeff Bond announced that the magazine would be "going on hiatus into 2007", promising that in the near future it would return "on an irregular basis for in-depth spotlights & special issues". The magazine was succeeded by Geek Monthly, with Bond at the helm.

Cinefantastique relaunched as a webzine in August 2007, called Cinefantastique Online, under the supervision of the magazine's former West Coast Editor, Steve Biodrowski.

In 2009, Cinefantastique was purchased by and became a wholly owned trademark of Fourth Castle Micromedia, a New York–based company owned by genre marketing veteran Joe Sena. Fourth Castle is known for their EMCE Toys brand, whose first lines of "Retro Cloth" 8" action figures were reproductions of classic MEGO toys.

Fourth Castle produced a one-shot, Cinefantastique Presents The Ultimate Guide To Zombies in 2012. The magazine was slated for relaunch in 2015 (but never did), and Biodrowski continued to run Cinefantastique Online while Dan Persons produced podcasts for the publication until mid-2020, the date of the last new article at Cinefantastique Online.

== See also ==
- Starburst – British science fiction, fantasy, and horror entertainment magazine
- Starlog – American science fiction media publication founded in 1976
