= List of Timely and Atlas Comics publications =

This is a list of the comic books published by Timely Comics (1939–1951) and Atlas Comics (1951–1961) prior to the companies' transformation into Marvel Comics in 1961.

== Timely Comics ==
Title	Series	Issues	Dates	Notes	Reference
Actual Romances		#1–2	Oct 1949 – Jan 1950	continues with True Secrets	
All Select Comics		#1–11	Fall 1943 – Fall 1946	continues with Blonde Phantom Comics	
All Surprise Comics		#1–12	Fall 1943 – Winter 1946-1947	continues with Jeanie Comics	
All Teen Comics		#20	Jan 1947	continues from All-Winners Comics vol.1 continues with Teen Comics	
All True Crime		#37–46	Feb 1950 – Sep 1951	continues from All True Crime Cases subsequent issues published by Atlas Comics	
All True Crimes Cases		#26–36	Feb 1948 – Nov 1949	continues from Official True Crime Cases Comics continues with All True Crime	
All-Western Winners		#2–4	Winter 1948 – Apr 1949	continues from All Winners Comics vol. 3 continues with Western Winners	
All Winners Comics	vol. 1	#1–19	Summer 1941 – Fall 1946	continues with All Teen Comics	
All Winners Comics	vol. 2	#21	Winter 1946-1947	continues from Young Allies continues with Hedy De Vine Comics	
All Winners Comics	vol. 3	#1	Aug 1948	continues with All-Western Winners	
Amazing Comics		#1	Fall 1944	continues with Complete Comics	
Amazing Detective Cases		#3–8	Nov 1950 – Sep 1951	subsequent issues published by Atlas Comics	
Amazing Mysteries		#32–35	May 1949 – Jan 1950	continues from Sub-Mariner Comics	
Animated Movie Tunes		#1–2	Fall 1945 – Summer 1946		
Annie Oakley		#1–4	Spring – Nov 1948	Subsequent issues published by Atlas Comics	
Apache Kid		53; 2–9	Dec 1950 – Nov 1951	continues from Reno Browne, Hollywood's Greatest Cowgirl renumbered after 53 to 2 subsequent issues published by Atlas Comics	
Awful Oscar		#11–12	Jun – Aug 1949	between issues 10 and 13 of Oscar Comics	
Best Love		#33–36	Aug 1949 – Apr 1950	continues from Sub-Mariner Comics	
Best Western		#58–59	June 1949 – August 1950	continues from Martin Goodman's Best Western pulp magazine v5 #7	
Blackstone the Magician		#2–4	May – Sep 1948	first issue published by EC Comics	
Blaze Carson		#1–5	Sep 1948 – Jun 1949	continues with Rex Hart	
Blaze the Wonder Collie		#2–3	Oct 1949 – Feb 1950	continues from Molly Manton's Romances continues with Crime Must Lose	
Blonde Phantom Comics		#12–22	Winter 1946 – Mar 1949	continues from All Select Comics continues with Lovers	
Captain America Comics		#1–73	Mar 1941 – Jul 1949	continues with Captain America's Weird Tales	
Captain America's Weird Tales		#74–75	Oct 1949 – Feb 1950	continues from Captain America Comics continues with Captain America vol. 1 published by Atlas Comics	
Cartoon Comedy		#1–5	Summer 1947 – Dec 1949		
Casey - Crime Photographer		#1–4	Aug 1949 – Feb 1950	continues with Two Gun Western	
Cindy Comics		#27–38	Fall 1947 – Feb 1950	continues from Krazy Komics continues with Cindy Smith	
Cindy Smith		#39–40	May – Jul 1950	continues from Cindy Comics continues with Crime Can't Win	
Comedy		#1–6	Jan 1942 – Jul 1943		
Comedy Comics	vol. 1	#9–34	Apr 1942 – Fall 1946	continues from Daring Mystery Comics continues with Margie Comics	
Comedy Comics	vol. 2	#1–10	May 1948 – 1950		
Comic Capers		#1–6	Fall 1944 – Fall 1946		
Comics for Kids		#1–2	Summer 1945		
Complete Comics		#2	Winter 1944-1945	continues from Amazing Comics	
Complete Mystery		#1–4	Aug 1948 – Feb 1949	continues with True Complete Mystery	
Cowboy Romances		#1–3	Oct 1949 – Mar 1950	continues with Young Men	
Cowgirl Romances		#28	Jan 1950	continues from Jeanie Comics	
Crime Can't Win		#41–43	Sep 1950 – Feb 1951	continues from Cindy Smith subsequent issues renumbered and published by Atlas Comics	
Crime Cases Comics		#24–27	Aug 1950 – Mar 1951	continues from Willie Comicsvol. 2 subsequent issues renumbered and published by Atlas Comics	
Crime Exposed	vol. 1	#1	Jun 1948		
Crime Exposed	vol. 2	#1–6	Dec 1950 – Oct 1951	Subsequent issues published by Atlas Comics	
Crimefighters		#1–10	Apr 1948 – Nov 1949	continues with Atlas Comics series Crime Fighters	
Crime Must Lose		#4–9	Oct 1950 – Oct 1951	continued from Blaze the Wonder Collie subsequent issues published by Atlas Comics	
Cupid		#1–2	Dec 1949 – Mar 1950		
Daring Comics		#9–12	Fall 1944 – Fall 1945	continues from Daring Mystery Comics	
Daring Mystery Comics		#1–8	Jan 1940 – Jan 1942	continues as both Comedy Comics and Daring Comics	
Dopey Duck		#1–2	Fall 1945 – Apr 1946	continues with Wacky Duck	
Faithful		#1–2	Nov 1949 – Feb 1950		
Film Funnies		#1–2	Nov 1949 – Feb 1950		
Frankie and Lana Comics		#12–15	Dec 1948 – Jun 1949	continues from Frankie Comics continues with Frankie Fuddle	
Frankie Comics		#4–11	Winter 1946-1947 – Oct 1948	continues from Movie Tunes continues with Frankie and Lana Comics	
Frankie Fuddle		#16–17	Aug – Nov 1949	continues from Frankie and Lana Comics	
Funny Frolics		#1–5	1945 – 1946		
Funny Tunes		#16–23	1944 – 1946	cover titled Animated Funny Comic-Tunes continues from Krazy Comics 15 continues with Oscar Comics	
Gay Comics	vol. 1	#1	Mar 1944	one-shot	
Gay Comics	vol. 2	#18–40	Fall 1944 – Oct 1949	continues with Honeymoon	
Gayety	vol. 1	#1–7	Sep 1941 – Nov 1942		
Gayety	vol. 2	#1–10	Apr 1943 – 1950		
Girl Comics	vol. 1	#1–10	Oct 1949 – Sep 1951	subsequent issues published by Atlas Comics	
The Gunhawk		#12–17	Nov 1950 – Oct 1951	continues from Whip Wilson subsequent issue published by Atlas Comics	
Hedy De Vine Comics		#22–35	Aug 1947 – Oct 1949	continues from All-Winners Comics vol. 2 continues with Hedy of Hollywood Comics	
Hedy of Hollywood Comics		#36–44	Feb 1950 – Sep 1951	continues from Hedy De Vine Comics subsequent issues published by Atlas Comics	
Honeymoon		#41	Jan 1950	continues from Gay Comics vol. 2	
The Human Torch	vol. 1	#2–35	Fall 1940 – Mar 1949	continues from Red Raven Comics there are two #5s subsequent issues published by Atlas Comics	
Ideal		#1–5	Jul 1948 – Mar 1949	continues with Love Romances	
Ideal Comics		#1–4	Fall 1944 – Spring 1946	continues with Willie Comics vol. 1	
It's a Duck's Life		#4–9	Nov 1950 – Oct 1951	continues from Wonder Duck subsequent issues published by Atlas Comics	
Jeanie Comics		#13–27	Apr 1947 – Oct 1949	continues from All Surprise Comics continues with Cowgirl Romances	
Joker	vol. 1	#1	Oct 1941	one-shot	
Joker	vol. 2	#1–4	Spring 1942 – Fall 1943		
Joker Comics		#1–42	Apr 1942 – 1950	continues with Atlas Comics series Adventures into Terror	
Journey into Unknown Worlds	vol. 1	#36–38	Sep 1950 – Feb 1951	continues from Teen Comics	
Journey into Unknown Worlds	vol. 2	#4–7	Apr – Oct 1951	numbering starts at 4 (from 3 issues of vol. 1) subsequent issues published by Atlas Comics	
Junior Miss	vol. 1	#1	Winter 1944	one-shot	
Junior Miss	vol. 2	#24–39	Apr 1947 – Aug 1950		
Justice	vol. 1	#7–9; 4–23	Fall 1947 – Sep 1951	continues from Wacky Duck renumbered after 9 to 4 subsequent issues published by Atlas Comics	
The Kellys		#23–25	Jan – Jun 1950	continues from Rusty and Her Family continues with Spy Cases	
Kent Blake of the Secret Service		#1–3	May – Sep 1951	subsequent issues published by Atlas Comics	
Kid Colt	vol. 1	#1–4	Aug 1948 – Feb 1949	continues with Kid Colt Outlaw vol. 2 published by Marvel Comics	
Kid Colt, Outlaw		#5–16	May 1949 – Jul 1951	continues from Kid Colt subsequent issues published by Atlas Comics	
Kid Komics		#1–10	Feb 1943 – Spring 1945-1946	continues with Kid Movie Komics	
Kid Movie Komics		#11	Summer 1946	continues from Kid Komics continues with Rusty Comics	
Krazy Komics	vol. 1	#1–26	Jul 1942 – Mar 1947	continues with Funny Tunes from #15 continues with Cindy Comics	
Krazy Komics	vol. 2	#1–2	Aug – Nov 1948		
Krazy Krow		#1–3	Summer 1945 – Winter 1945-1946		
Lana		#1–7	Aug 1948 – Aug 1949	continues with Little Lana	
Lawbreakers Always Lose		#1–10	Spring 1948 – Oct 1949		
Li'l Willie		#20–21	Jul – Sep 1949	continues from Willie Comics vol. 1 continues with Willie Comics vol. 2	
Little Aspirin		#1–3	Jul – Dec 1949		
Little Lana		#8–9	Nov 1949 – Mar 1950	continues from Lana Comics	
Little Lenny		#1–3	Jun – Nov 1949		
Little Lizzie	vol. 1	#1–5	Jun 1949 – Apr 1950	vol. 2 published by Atlas Comics	
Love Adventures		#1–7	Oct 1949 – Oct 1951	subsequent issues published by Atlas Comics	
Love Classics		#1–2	Nov 1949 – Feb 1950		
Love Dramas		#1–2	Oct 1949 – Jan 1950		
Loveland		#1–2	Nov 1949 – Feb 1950		
Love Romances	vol. 1	#6–18	May 1949 – Sep 1951	continues from Ideal subsequent issues published by Atlas Comics	
Lovers		#23–35	May 1949 – Sep 1951	continues from Blonde Phantom Comics subsequent issues published by Atlas Comics	
Love Secrets		#1–2	Oct 1949 – Jan 1950		
Love Tales		#36–48	May 1949 – Sep 1951	continues from The Human Torch vol. 1 subsequent issues published by Atlas Comics	
Love Trails		#1	Dec 1949		
Man Comics		#1–10	Dec 1949 – Oct 1951	subsequent issues published by Atlas Comics	
Margie Comics		#35–49	Winter 1946-1947 – Dec 1949	continues from Comedy Comics continues with Reno Browne, Hollywood's Greatest Cowgirl	
Marine Comedy		#1	Winter 1944	one-shot	
Marvel Comics		#1	Oct 1939	continues with Marvel Mystery Comics vol. 1	
Marvel Mystery Comics	vol. 1	#2–92	Dec 1939 – Jun 1949	continues from Marvel Comics continues with Marvel Tales vol. 2 published by Marvel Comics	
Marvel Tales	vol. 1	#93–103	Aug 1949 – Oct 1951	continues from Marvel Mystery Comics vol. 1 subsequent issues published by Atlas Comics	
Men's Adventures		#4–10	Aug 1950 – Oct 1951	continues from True Adventures subsequent issues published by Atlas Comics	
Mighty Mouse	vol. 1	#1–4	Fall 1946 – Summer 1947	subsequent issues published by St. John Publications vol. 2 published by Marvel Comics	
Millie the Model Comics		#1–30	1945 – Sep 1951	Subsequent issues published by Atlas Comics	
Miss America Comics		#1	1944	continues with Miss America Magazine	
Miss America Magazine	vol. 1	#2–6	Nov 1944 – Mar 1945	continues from Miss America Comics	
Miss America Magazine	vol. 2	#1–6	Apr – Sep 1945		
Miss America Magazine	vol. 3	#1–6	Oct 1945 – Apr 1946		
Miss America Magazine	vol. 4	#1–6	May – Oct 1946		
Miss America Magazine	vol. 5	#1–6	Nov 1946 – Apr 1947		
Miss America Magazine	vol. 6	#1–3	May – Jul 1947		
Miss America Magazine	vol. 7	#1–41	Aug 1947 – Sep 1951	subsequent issues published by Atlas Comics	
Miss Fury		#1–8	Winter 1942-43 – Winter 1945-46		
Mitzi Comics		#1	Spring 1948	continues as Mitzi's Boy Friend	
Mitzi's Boy Friend		#2–7	Jun 1948 – Apr 1949	continues from Mitzi Comics continues with Mitzi's Romances	
Mitzi's Romances		#8–10	Jun – Dec 1949	continues from Mitzi's Boy Friend	
Molly Manton's Romances		#1	Sep 1949	continues with Romances of Molly Manton continues with Blaze the Wonder Collie	
Movie Tunes		#3	Fall 1946	continues from Animated Movie Tunes continues with Frankie Comics	
My Diary		#1–2	Dec 1949 – Mar 1950	continues with My Friend Irma	
My Friend Irma		#3–11	Jun 1950 – Oct 1951	continues from My Diary subsequent issues published by Atlas Comics	
My Love	vol. 1	#1–4	Jul 1949 – Apr 1950	vol. 2 published by Marvel Comics	
My Own Romance		#4–18	Mar 1949 – Sep 1951	continues from My Romance subsequent issues published by Atlas Comics	
My Romance		#1–3	Sep 1948 – Jan 1949	continues with My Own Romance	
Mystic		#1–4	Mar – Sep 1951	subsequent issues published by Atlas Comics	
Mystic Comics	vol. 1	#1–10	Mar 1940 – Aug 1942		
Mystic Comics	vol. 2	#1–4	Oct 1944 – Mar 1945		
Namora	vol. 1	#1–3	Aug – Dec 1948	vol. 2 published by Marvel Comics	
Nellie the Nurse		#1–30	1945 – Oct 1951	subsequent issues published by Atlas Comics	
Official True Crime Cases Comics		#24–25	Fall 1947 – Winter 1947	continues from Sub-Mariner Comics continues with All True Crime Cases	
Oscar Comics		#24–25; 3–10, 13	Spring 1947 – Oct 1949	continues from Funny Tunes renumbered after 25 to 3 title becomes Awful Oscar for issues 11-12 and then reverts	
Our Love		#1–2	Sep 1949 – Jan 1950	continues with True Secrets	
Patsy Walker		#1–36	1945 – Sep 1951	subsequent issues published by Atlas Comics	
Powerhouse Pepper		#2–5	Spring – Nov 1948	continues from Powerhouse Pepper Comics	
Powerhouse Pepper Comics		#1	1943	continues with Powerhouse Pepper	
Private Eye		#1–5	Jan – Sep 1951	subsequent issues published by Atlas Comics	
Rangeland Love		#1–2	Dec 1949 – Mar 1950		
Real Experiences		#25	Jan 1950	continues from Tiny Tessie	
Red Raven Comics		#1	Aug 1940	continues with The Human Torch vol. 1	
Reno Browne, Hollywood's Greatest Cowgirl		#50–52	Apr – Sep 1950	continues from Margie Comics continues with Apache Kid	
Rex Hart		#6–8	Aug 1949 – Feb 1950	continues from Blaze Carson continues with Whip Wilson	
Romance Diary		#1–2	Dec 1949 – Mar 1950		
Romance Tales		#7–9	Oct 1949 – Apr 1950		
Romances of Molly Manton		#2	Dec 1949	continues from Molly Manton's Romances continues with Romantic Affairs	
Romances of the West		#1–2	Nov 1949 – Mar 1950		
Romantic Affairs		#3	Mar 1950	continues from Romances of Molly Manton	
Rusty and Her Family		#22	Sep 1949	continues from Rusty Comics continues with The Kellys	
Rusty Comics		#12–21	Apr 1947 – Jul 1949	continues from Kid Movie Komics continues with Rusty and Her Family	
Salute		#1	Apr 1943	one-shot	
Silly Tunes		#1–7	Fall 1945 – Jun 1947		
Snap		#4–10	Jan 1943 – ??		
Space Squadron		#1–3	Jun – Oct 1951	subsequent issues published by Atlas Comics	
Sport Stars		#1	Nov 1949	continues with Sports Action	
Sports Action		#2–9	Feb 1950 – Oct 1951	continues from Sport Stars subsequent issues published by Atlas Comics	
Spy Cases		#26–28	Sep 1950 – Feb 1951	continues from The Kellys	
Stag		#1	1942	one-shot	
Sub-Mariner Comics		#1–32	Spring 1941 – Jun 1949	continues after 23 with Official True Crime Cases Comics continues after #31 with Amazing Mysteries continues after #32 with Best Love	
Sun Girl		#1–3	Aug – Dec 1948		
Super Rabbit Comics		#1–14	1944 – Nov 1948		
Suspense		#1–10	Dec 1949 – Sep 1951	subsequent issues published by Atlas Comics	
Teen Comics		#21–35	Apr 1947 – May 1950	continues from All Teen Comics continues with Journey into Unknown Worlds	
Terry-Toons Comics		#1–59	Oct 1942 – Aug 1947	continues with St. John Publications series	
Tessie the Typist Comics		#1–23	Summer 1944 – Aug 1949	continues with Tiny Tessie	
Tex Morgan		#1–9	Aug 1948 – Feb 1950		
Tex Taylor		#1–9	Sep 1948 – Mar 1950		
Texas Kid		#1–5	Jan – Sep 1951	subsequent issues published by Atlas Comics	
Tiny Tessie		#24	Oct 1949	continues from Tessie the Typist Comics continues with Real Experiences	
Tough Kid Squad Comics		#1	Mar 1942	one-shot	
True Adventures		#3	May 1950	continues from True Western continues with Men's Adventures	
True Complete Mystery		#5–8	Apr – Oct 1949	continues from Complete Mystery	
True Secrets		#3–10	Mar 1950 – Oct 1951	continues from Actual Romances subsequent issues published by Atlas Comics	
True Western		#1–2	Dec 1949 – Mar 1950	continues with True Adventures	
Two-Gun Kid	vol. 1	#1–10	Mar 1948 – Nov 1949	subsequent volume published by Atlas Comics	
U.S.A. Comics		#1–17	Aug 1941 – Fall 1945		
Venus		#1–16	Aug 1948 – Aug 1951	subsequent issues published by Atlas Comics	
Wacky Duck	vol. 1	#3–6	Fall 1946 – Summer 1947	continues from Dopey Duck continues with Justice vol. 1	
Wacky Duck	vol. 2	#1–2	Aug – Oct 1948		
War Comics		#1–6	Dec 1950 – Oct 1951	subsequent issues published by Atlas Comics	
Western Life Romances		#1–2	Dec 1949 – Mar 1950		
Western Outlaws and Sheriffs		#60–69	Dec 1949 – Oct 1951	subsequent issues published by Atlas Comics	
Western Winners		5–7	Jun – Dec 1949	continues from All-Western Winners continues with Black Rider	
Whip Wilson		9–11	Apr – Sep 1950	continues from Rex Hart continues with The Gunhawk	
Wild West		#1–2	Spring – Jul 1948	continues with Wild Western	
Wild Western		#3–18	Sep 1948 – Oct 1951	continues from Wild West subsequent issues published by Atlas Comics	
Willie Comics	vol. 1	5–19	Fall 1946 – May 1949	continues from Ideal Comics continues with Li'l Willie	
Willie Comics	vol. 2	#22–23	Jan – May 1950	continues from Li'l Willie continues with Crime Cases Comics	
Wonder Duck		#1–3	Sep 1949 – Mar 1950	continues with It's a Duck's Life	
Young Allies	vol. 1	#1–20	Summer 1941 – Oct 1946	continues with All-Winners Comics vol. 2 published by Marvel Comics	
Young Hearts		#1–2	Nov 1949 – Feb 1950		
Young Men	vol. 1	#4–11	Jun 1950 – Aug 1951	subsequent issues published by Atlas Comics	
Ziggy Pig - Silly Seal Comics	vol. 1	#1–6	1944 – Sep 1946	vol. 2 published by Marvel Comics	

== Atlas Comics ==
Title	Series	Issues	Dates	Notes	Reference
2-Gun Western		#4	May 1956	continues from Billy Buckskin continues with Two Gun Western	
3-D Action		#1	Jan 1954	one-shot	
3-D Tales of the West		#1	Jan 1954	one-shot	
Actual Confessions		#13–14	Oct – Dec 1952	continues from Love Adventures	
Adventure into Mystery		#1–8	May 1956 – Jul 1957		
Adventures into Terror	vol. 1	#43–44	Nov 1950 – Feb 1951	continues from the Timely Comics series Joker Comics	
Adventures into Terror	vol. 2	#3–31	Apr 1951 – May 1954	Starts at #3, considering the two issues of vol. 1	
Adventures into Weird Worlds		#1–30	Jan 1952 – Jun 1954		
Adventures of Homer Ghost		#1–2	Jun – Aug 1957		
All True Crime		#47–52	Nov 1951 – Sep 1952	previous issues published by Timely Comics	
Amazing Adult Fantasy		#7–14	Dec 1961 – Jul 1962	continues from Amazing Adventures vol. 1 continues with Marvel Comics' Amazing Fantasy	
Amazing Adventures	vol. 1	#1–6	Jun – Nov 1961	continues with Amazing Adult Fantasy subsequent volumes published by Marvel Comics	
Amazing Detective Cases		#9–14	Nov 1951 – Sep 1952	previous issues published by Timely Comics	
Annie Oakley		#5–11	Jun 1955 – Jun 1956	Previous issues published by Timely Comics	
Apache Kid		#10–19	Jan 1952 – Apr 1956	Previous issues published by Timely Comics continues with Western Gunfighters	
The Arizona Kid		#1–6	Mar 1951 – Jan 1952		
Arrowhead		#1–4	Apr – Nov 1954		
Astonishing		#3–63	Apr 1951 – Aug 1957	continues from Marvel Boy	
Battle		#1–70	Mar 1951 – Jun 1960		
Battle Action		#1–30	Feb 1952 – Aug 1957		
Battle Brady		#10–14	Jan – Jun 1953	continues from Men in Action	
Battlefield		#1–11	Apr 1952 – May 1953		
Battlefront		#1–48	Jun 1952 – Aug 1957		
Battleground		#1–20	Sep 1954 – Sep 1957		
Bible Tales for Young Folk		#1–3	Aug – Dec 1953	continues with Bible Tales for Young People	
Bible Tales for Young People		#4–5	Feb – Mar 1954	continues from Bible Tales for Young Folk	
Billy Buckskin		#1–3	Nov 1955 – Mar 1956	continues with 2 Gun Western	
Black Knight	vol. 1	#1–5	May 1955 – Apr 1956	subsequent volumes published by Marvel Comics	
Black Rider	vol. 1	#8–27	Mar 1950 – Mar 1955	continues from Western Winners continues with Western Tales of Black Rider	
Black Rider	vol. 2	#1	Sep 1957	one-shot	
Buck Duck		#1–4	Jun – Dec 1953		
Captain America	vol. 1	#76–78	May – Sep 1954	continues from Timely Comics' Captain America's Weird Tales subsequent volumes published by Marvel Comics	
Cartoon Kids		#1	1957	one-shot	
Caught		#1–5	Aug 1956 – Apr 1957		
Combat		#1–11	Jun 1952– Apr 1953		
Combat Casey		#6–34	Jan 1953 – Jul 1957	continues from War Combat	
Combat Kelly	vol. 1	#1–44	Nov 1951 – Aug 1957	vol. 2 published by Marvel Comics	
Commando Adventures		#1–2	Jun – Aug 1957		
Cowboy Action		#5–11	Mar 1955 – Mar 1956	continues from Western Thrillers continues with Quick Trigger Western	
Crazy	vol. 1	#1–7	Dec 1953 – Jul 1954	vol. 2 published by Marvel Comics	
Crime Can't Win		4–12	Apr 1951 – Sep 1952	continues from Timely Comics series	
Crime Cases Comics		#5–12	May 1951 – Jul 1952	continues from Timely Comics series	
Crime Exposed	vol. 2	#7–14	Dec 1951 – Jun 1952	continues from Timely Comics series	
Crime Fighters		#11–13	Sep 1954 – Jan 1955	continues from Timely Comics Crimefighters	
Crime Must Lose		#10–12	Dec 1951 – Apr 1952	continues from Timely Comics series	
A Date with Millie	vol. 1	#1–7	Oct 1956 – Aug 1957		
A Date with Millie	vol. 2	#1–7	Oct 1959 – Oct 1960	continues with Life with Millie	
A Date with Patsy		#1	Sep 1957	one-shot	
Della Vision		#1–3	Apr – Aug 1955	continues with Patty Powers	
Devil Dog Dugan		#1–3	Jul – Nov 1956	continues with Tales of the Marines	
Dexter the Demon		#7	Sep 1957	continues from Melvin the Monster	
Dippy Duck		#1	Oct 1957		
Frontier Western		#1–10	Feb 1956 – Aug 1957		
G. I. Tales		#4–6	Feb – Jul 1957	continues from Sergeant Barney Baker	
Girl Comics	vol. 1	#11–12	Nov 1951 – Jan 1952	previous issues published by Timely Comics continues with Girl Confessions vol.2 published by Marvel Comics	
Girl Confessions		#13–35	Mar 1952 – Aug 1954	continues from Girl Comics vol. 1	
Girl's Life		#1–6	Jan – Nov 1954		
The Gunhawk		#18	Dec 1951	previous issues published by Timely Comics	
Gunsmoke Western		#32–64	Dec 1955 – May 1961	continues from Western Tales of Black Rider subsequent issues published by Marvel Comics	
Hedy of Hollywood Comics		#45–50	Nov 1951 – Sep 1952	previous issues published by Timely Comics	
Hedy Wolfe		#1	Aug 1957	one-shot	
Homer Hooper		#1–4	Jul – Dec 1953		
Homer, the Happy Ghost	vol. 1	#1–22	Mar 1955 – Nov 1958	vol. 2 was published by Marvel Comics	
The Human Torch	vol. 1	#36–38	Apr – Aug 1954	previous issues published by Timely Comics continues with Love Tales	
It's a Duck's Life		#10–11	Dec 1951 – Feb 1952	previous issues published by Timely Comics	
Jann of the Jungle		#8–17	Nov 1955 – Jun 1957	continues from Jungle Tales	
Journey into Mystery		#1–68	Jun 1952 – May 1961	subsequent issues published by Marvel Comics	
Journey into Unknown Worlds	vol. 2	#8–59	Dec 1951 – Jul 1957	previous issues published by Timely Comics vol. 3 published by Marvel Comics	
Jungle Action	vol. 1	#1–6	Oct 1954 – Aug 1955	vol. 2 published by Marvel Comics	
Jungle Tales		#1–7	Sep 1954 – Sep 1955	continues with Jann of the Jungle	
Justice	vol. 1	#24–52	Nov 1951 – Mar 1955	previous issues published by Timely Comics continues with Tales of Justice	
Kathy		#1–11	Oct 1959 – Jun 1961	subsequent issues published by Marvel Comics	
Kent Blake of the Secret Service		#4–14	Nov 1951 – Jul 1953	previous issues published by Timely Comics	
Kid Colt, Outlaw		#17–98	Nov 1951 – May 1961	previous issues published by Timely Comics subsequent issues published by Marvel Comics	
The Kid from Dodge City		#1–2	Jul – Sep 1957		
The Kid from Texas		#1–2	Jun – Aug 1957		
Kid Slade, Gunfighter		#5–8	Jan – Jul 1957	continues from Matt Slade, Gunfighter	
Life with Millie		#8–11	Dec 1960 – Jun 1961	continues from A Date with Millie subsequent issues published by Marvel Comics	
Little Lizzie	vol. 2	#1–3	Sep 1953 – Jan 1954	vol. 1 published by Timely Comics	
Lorna the Jungle Girl		#6–26	Mar 1954 – Aug 1957	continues from Lorna the Jungle Queen	
Lorna the Jungle Queen		#1–5	Jul 1953 – Feb 1954	continues with Lorna the Jungle Girl	
Love Adventures		#8–12	Dec 1951 – Aug 1952	previous issues published by Timely Comics continues with Actual Confessions	
Love Romances	vol. 1	#19–93	Nov 1951 – May 1961	previous issues published by Timely Comics subsequent issues published by Marvel Comics	
Lovers		#36–86	Nov 1951 – Aug 1957	previous issues published by Timely Comics	
Love Tales		#49–75	Nov 1951 – Sep 1957	previous issues published by Timely Comics	
Man Comics		#11–28	Dec 1951– Sep 1953	previous issues published by Timely Comics	
Marines at War		#5–7	Apr – Aug 1957	continues from Tales of the Marines	
Marines in Action		#1–14	Jun 1955 – Sep 1957		
Marines in Battle		#1–25	Aug 1954 – Sep 1958		
Marvel Tales	vol. 1	#104–159	Dec 1951 – Aug 1957	previous issues published by Timely Comics vol. 2 published by Marvel Comics	
Marvin Mouse		#1	Sep 1957		
Matt Slade, Gunfighter		#1–4	May – Nov 1956	continues with Kid Slade, Gunfighter	
Meet Miss Bliss		#1–4	May – Nov 1955		
Melvin the Monster		#1–6	Jul 1956 – Jul 1957	continues with Dexter the Demon	
Men in Action		#1–9	Apr – Dec 1952	continues with Battle Brady	
Men's Adventures		#11–28	Dec 1951 – Jul 1954	previous issues published by Timely Comics	
Menace		#1–11	Mar 1953 – May 1954		
Millie the Model Comics		#31–103	Nov 1951 – July 1961	previous issues published by Timely Comics; Subsequent issues published by Marvel Comics	
Miss America		#51–93	Apr 1953 – Nov 1958	continues from Miss America Magazine	
Miss America Magazine	vol. 7	#42–50	Nov 1951 – Mar 1953	previous issues published by Timely Comics continues with Miss America	
The Monkey and the Bear		#1–3	Sep 1953 – Jan 1954		
My Friend Irma		#12–48	Nov 1951 – Feb 1955	previous issues published by Timely Comics	
My Girl Pearl		#1–11	Apr 1955 – Apr 1961		
My Love Story		#1–9	Apr 1956 – Aug 1957		
My Own Romance		#19–76	Nov 1951 – Jul 1960	previous issues published by Timely Comics continues with Teen-Age Romance	
Mystery Tales		#1–54	Mar 1952 – Aug 1957		
Mystic		#5–61	Nov 1951 –Aug 1957	previous issues published by Timely Comics	
Mystical Tales		#1–8	Jun 1956 – Aug 1957		
Navy Action	vol. 1	#1–11	Aug 1954 – Apr 1956	continues with Sailor Sweeney	
Navy Action	vol. 2	#15–18	Jan – Aug 1957	continues from Sailor Sweeney	
Navy Combat		#1–20	Jun 1955 – Oct 1958		
Navy Tales		#1–4	Jan – Jul 1957		
Nellie the Nurse v1		#31–36	Dec 1951 – Oct 1952	previous issues published by Timely Comics	
Nellie the Nurse v2		#1	Jan 1957		
Outlaw Fighters		#1–5	Aug 1954 – Apr 1955		
The Outlaw Kid	vol. 1	#1–19	Sep 1954 – Sep 1957	vol. 2 published by Marvel Comics	
Patsy and Hedy		#1–76	Feb 1952 – Jun 1961	subsequent issues published by Marvel Comics	
Patsy and Her Pals		#1–29	May 1953 – Aug 1957		
Patsy Walker		#37–94	Nov 1951 – Apr 1961	previous issues published by Timely Comics subsequent issues published by Marvel Comics	
Patty Powers		#4–7	Oct 1955 – Oct 1956	continues from Della Vision	
Pinky Lee		#1–5	Jul – Dec 1955		
Police Action		#1–7	Jan – Nov 1954		
Police Badge #479		#5	Sep 1955	continues from Spy Thrillers	
Private Eye		#6–8	Nov 1951 – Mar 1952	previous issues published by Timely Comics	
Quick Trigger Western		#12–19	May 1956 – Sep 1957	continues from Cowboy Action	
Rawhide Kid	vol. 1	#1–16	Mar 1955 – Sep 1957	subsequent volumes published by Marvel Comics	
Ringo Kid		#1–21	Aug 1954 – Sep 1957		
Riot		#1–6	Apr 1954 – Jun 1956		
Romances of Nurse Helen Grant		#1	Aug 1957	one-shot	
Rugged Action		#1–4	Dec 1954 – Jun 1955	continues with Strange Stories of Suspense	
Secret Story Romances		#1–21	Nov 1953 – Mar 1956	continues with True Tales of Love	
Sergeant Barney Baker		#1–3	Aug – Dec 1956	continues with G.I. Tales	
Sherry the Showgirl	vol. 1	#1–7	Jul 1956 – Aug 1957	issue #4 (Feb 1957) is cover titled and listed in the indicia as Showgirls continues with Showgirls	
Showgirls	vol. 1	#1–2	Jun – Aug 1957	continues from Sherry the Showgirl	
Six-Gun Western		#1–4	Dec – Jul 1957		
Space Squadron		#4–5	Dec 1951 – Feb 1952	previous issues published by Timely Comics continues with Space Worlds	
Space Worlds		#6	Apr 1952	continues from Space Squadron	
Spaceman		#1–6	Sep 1953 – Jul 1954		
Spellbound	vol. 1	#1–34	Mar 1952 – Jun 1957	vol. 2 published by Marvel Comics	
Sports Action		#10–14	Jan – Sep 1952	previous issues published by Timely Comics	
Spy Cases		#4–19	Apr 1951 – Oct 1953		
Spy Fighters		#1–15	Mar 1951 – Jul 1953		
Spy Thrillers		#1–4	Nov 1954 – May 1955	continues with Police Badge #479	
Stories of Romance		#5–13	Mar 1956 – Aug 1957		
Strange Stories of Suspense		#5–16	Oct 1955 – Aug 1957	continues from Rugged Action	
Strange Tales		#1–85	June 1951 – June 1961	subsequent issues published by Marvel Comics	
Strange Tales of the Unusual		#1–11	Dec 1955 – Aug 1957		
Strange Worlds		#1–5	Dec 1958 – Aug 1959		
Sub-Mariner	vol. 1	#33–42	Apr 1954 – Oct 1955	numbering continues from Timely Comics series Sub-Mariner Comics subsequent volumes published by Marvel Comics	
Suspense		#11–29	Nov 1951 – Apr 1953	previous issues published by Timely Comics	
Tales of Justice		#53–67	May 1955 – Sep 1957	continues from Justice	
Tales of Suspense	vol. 1	#1–18	Jan 1959 – 1961	subsequent issues published by Marvel Comics	
Tales of the Marines		#4	Feb 1957	continues from Devil Dog Dugan continues with Marines at War	
Tales to Astonish	vol. 1	#1–20	Jan 1959 – Jun 1961	subsequent issues published by Marvel Comics	
Teen-Age Romance		#77–81	Sep 1960 – May 1961	continues from My Own Romance subsequent issues published by Marvel Comics	
Texas Kid		#6–10	Nov 1951 – Jul 1952	previous issues published by Timely Comics	
True Secrets		#11–40	Nov 1951 – Sep 1956	previous issues published by Timely Comics	
True Tales of Love		#22–31	Apr 1956 – Sep 1957	continues from Secret Story Romances	
Two Gun Kid	vol. 2	#11–59	Nov 1953 – Apr 1961	continues the number of vol. 1 which was published by Timely Comics subsequent issues published by Marvel Comics	
Venus		#17–19	Dec 1951 – Apr 1952	previous issues published by Timely Comics	
War Action		#1–14	Apr 1952 – Jun 1953		
War Adventures		#1–13	Jan 1952 – Feb 1953		
War Combat		#1–5	Mar – Nov 1952	continues with Combat Casey	
War Comics		#7–49	Dec 1951 – Sep 1957	previous issues published by Timely Comics	
Wendy Parker		#1–8	Jul 1953 – Jul 1954		
Western Gunfighters	vol. 1	#20–27	Jun 1956 – Aug 1957	continues from Apache Kid vol. 2 published by Marvel Comics	
Western Kid	vol. 1	#1–17	Dec 1954 – Aug 1957	vol. 2 published by Marvel Comics	
Western Outlaws		#1–21	Feb 1954 – Aug 1957		
Western Outlaws and Sheriffs		#70–73	Dec 1951 – Jun 1952	previous issues published by Timely Comics	
Western Tales of Black Rider		#28–31	May – Nov 1955	continues from Black Rider continues with Gunsmoke Western	
Western Thrillers		#1–4	Nov 1954 – Feb 1955	continues with Cowboy Action	
Western Trails		#1–2	May – Jul 1957		
Wild		#1–5	Feb – Aug 1954		
Wild Western		#19–57	Dec 1951 – Sep 1957	previous issues published by Timely Comics	
Willie the Wiseguy		#1	Sep 1957		
World of Fantasy		#1–19	May 1956 – Aug 1959		
World of Mystery		#1–7	Jun 1956 – Jul 1957		
World of Suspense		#1–8	Apr 1956 – Jul 1957		
World's Greatest Songs		#1	Sep 1954	one-shot	
Wyatt Earp	vol. 1	#1–29	Nov 1955 – 1960	vol. 2 published by Marvel Comics	
Yellow Claw		#1–4	Oct 1956 – Apr 1957		
Young Men	vol. 1	#12	Dec 1951	previous issues published by Timely Comics	
Young Men	vol. 2	#21–28	Jun 1953 – Jun 1954	continues from Young Men on the Battlefield	

== See also ==
- Timely Comics
- Altas Comics
- Marvel Comics
- List of current Marvel Comics publications
