= Jay Scott Pike =

American comic book artist (1924–2015)

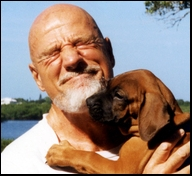
- Jay Scott Pike in 2009
- Born: September 6, 1924 Philadelphia, Pennsylvania, U.S.
- Died: September 13, 2015 (aged 91)
- Areas: Penciller, Inker
- Pseudonym: Jim Pike
- Notable works: Dolphin; Jann of the Jungle

Jay Scott Pike (September 6, 1924 – September 13, 2015) was an American comic book artist and commercial illustrator known for his 1950s and 1960s work for Marvel Comics and DC Comics, advertising art, and as a good girl artist. He created the DC character Dolphin and co-created the Marvel character Jann of the Jungle.

== Biography ==
=== Early life and career ===
Born in Philadelphia, Pennsylvania, on September 6, 1924, Jay Scott Pike enrolled at the Art Students League in Manhattan, New York City at what he said was age 15 or 16: "I know I was partway into high school. I wasn't a junior or senior yet." After military service in the United States Marines from 1942 to 1946, he went on to study at the Parsons School of Design on G.I. Bill for one year, then Syracuse University for a semester, and, after his marriage in 1948, the Ringling School of Art in Sarasota, Florida, for a year-and-a-half. Afterward, he and his wife moved to northern New Jersey. After meeting comic-book artist Al Hartley, "I went into drawing comics with Al, but we just didn't get along, so by the time we decided to split I'd gotten to know [editor] Stan Lee" at Marvel Comics' 1950s precursor, Atlas Comics, "and Stan said that he would give me work of my own."

The DC Comics character Dolphin, created by Pike in Showcase #79 (December 1968). Cover art by Pike.

His earliest confirmed comic book art is the five-page story "The Living Dead", by an unknown writer, in Adventures into Terror #3 (April 1951), from Atlas Comics, the 1950s forerunner of Marvel Comics. Tentative earlier credits exist, but because it was not standard practice during this period to list complete writer/artist comic-book credits, confirmation is difficult. The interior art to "Captain Chaos" in the November 1952 issue of the magazine "Planet Stories" is credited to "J.S. Pike".

=== Comic books ===
Pike quickly became a regular Atlas Comics contributor, drawing in a variety of genres for such titles as the Westerns Black Rider, Red Warrior, Texas Kid, and Wild Western; such crime comics as All True Crime Cases Comics, Amazing Detective Cases, Crime Must Lose, and Justice; romance comics, including Girl Confessions, Love Romances, Love Tales, My Own Romance, Secret Story Romance, and True Secrets; war comics such as Battle, Battlefield, Battlefront, Combat Casey, Men's Adventures, Men in Action, and War Action; and horror comics including Adventures into Weird Worlds, Journey into Mystery, Mystic, and Uncanny Tales; and jungle adventure such as Jungle Tales and Lorna, the Jungle Girl, among other comics. With writer Don Rico, he co-created the character Jann of the Jungle in Jungle Tales #1 (September 1954), and drew her adventures in numerous issues of that title and her own series.

He recalled that soon after entering comics, the self-censorship Comics Code Authority impacted on his art. "I was drawing jungle girl comics: Jann of the Jungle and Lorna the Jungle Queen and it seems like another one, too, and I can remember I got a whole book back and had to make the bosoms smaller on the jungle girl, whichever one it was, and when she was flying through the trees on a vine or something her skirt couldn't go above her knees. I can remember having to go over the whole book and having to fix those things."

His final Atlas/Marvel works were the six-page story "When a Romance Ends" in Love Romances #87 (May 1960), and the five-page "Love or Infatuation?", written by Stan Lee, years later in issue #105 (May 1963). Many of Pike's 1950s Atlas stories were reprinted by Marvel Comics in the 1970s.

Pike began drawing for rival DC Comics in the mid-1960s, beginning with the 12-page story "In the Name of Love", starring Wendy Winthrop, Television Model, by an unknown writer, in Girls' Romances #99 (March 1964). He primarily drew for the publisher's romance comics, including Heart Throbs, Our Love Story, Secret Hearts, and Young Love. For Heart Throbs, Pike and inker Russ Jones illustrated the feature "3 Girls—Their Lives—Their Loves," which ran from 1966 to 1970.

In addition to his DC romance work, Pike as both writer and artist created the undersea superheroine Dolphin in Showcase #79 (December 1968). His stories continued to appear in DC Comics through Girls' Love Stories #180 (December 1973).

"Dog Tied", a pinup by Pike (signed) for the A. Fox calendar company

=== Later career ===
By the early 1960s, Pike was drawing covers for such magazines as Master Detective.

He also is known for his good girl art pinup work, including for the A. Fox calendar company.

As an advertising artist, he worked on campaigns for clients including Borden, Ford Motor Company, General Mills, Pepsi, Procter & Gamble, and Trans World Airlines. As well, he said in 2010, "I did do some [painted] nudes that Playboy had in their resorts and those were sold for me for a while. It didn't last too long because it came down from Playboy headquarters in Chicago that they didn't want any more artwork. Only photographs of the Playmates."

After a long hiatus from comic books, Pike returned in 1993 to draw layouts for two issues and then do full penciling for an issue on the DC Comics series Scarlett #12–14 (December 1993 – February 1994). He also penciled the 58-page story "All Good Things" in DC's one-shot comic Star Trek: The Next Generation The Series Finale (1994)

== Personal life ==
Pike was living in Sarasota, Florida, and married 67 years to his wife Margi at the time of his death on September 13, 2015. The couple had six children.
