= Mike Sekowsky =

American comics artist (1923–1989)

- Sekowsky with model Joyce Miller (1969). DC Comics publicity photo promoting Wonder Woman
- Born: Michael Sekowsky; November 19, 1923 Lansford, Pennsylvania, U.S.
- Died: March 30, 1989 (aged 65) Los Angeles, California, U.S.
- Areas: Writer, Penciller
- Awards: Alley Award (1963); Inkpot Award (1981)

Michael Sekowsky (/səˈkaʊski/; November 19, 1923 – March 30, 1989) was an American comics artist known as the penciler for DC Comics' Justice League of America during most of the 1960s, and as the regular writer and artist on Wonder Woman during the late 1960s and early 1970s.

== Biography ==
=== Early life and career ===
Sekowsky was born in Lansford, Pennsylvania, and began working in the comics medium in 1941, as an artist at Marvel Comics' predecessor, Timely Comics, in New York City. There he worked as both a cartoonist on such humor features as "Ziggy Pig and Silly Seal", and as a superhero artist on such star characters as Captain America and the Sub-Mariner in issues of All Winners Comics, Daring Comics, Marvel Mystery Comics, USA Comics, and Young Allies Comics. Sekowsky developed a reputation as one of the fastest artists in the comics field. Fellow Timely artist Gene Colan commented on his work: "His pencils were something to behold. Very loose, but so beautifully done. At the time, there was no one like him."

During the 1940s, Sekowsky married his first wife, Joanne Latta. Concurrently, he began a complicated relationship with artist Valerie (a.k.a. Violet) Barclay, who was working at the Manhattan restaurant Cafe Rouge. As Barclay recalled in a 2004 interview, "I was 17, and ... was making $18 a week as a hostess. Mike said, 'I'll get you a job making $35 a week as a [staff] inker, and you can [additionally] freelance over the weekend. I'll let you ink my stuff'. He went to editor Stan Lee and got me the job. I didn't know anything about inking. [Staff artist] Dave Gantz taught me — just by watching him". Sekowsky bestowed expensive gifts on her even after his marriage to Latta, causing friction in the Timely bullpen, which she left in 1949. She later described the office environment,

Mike was a very good human being. Everybody at Timely liked Mike. Nobody liked me because they thought I was doing a number on him. Which was true. World War II was on and there were no men around, so I just killed time with him. Everybody, Dave Gantz especially, picked up on that. ... [Mike] once tried to get me fired over my fling with [Timely artist] George Klein. Mike went to Stan Lee and said, 'Stan, I want her fired, and if she doesn't get fired, I'm going to quit'. Well, you couldn't ever tell Stan Lee what to do. Stan said, 'Well, Mike, it's been nice knowing you'.

Sekowsky, one of the nascent Marvel Comics' mainstays, chose to remain and "make George's life hell", Barclay said in 2004. She further described, "I was married before I met Mike, but my husband's divorce was not final. ... [I] had to go to court and get an annulment. Mike paid for it and it cost $350".

Sekowsky continued drawing for Timely in multiple genres through the 1940s and into the 1950s, on such Western characters as the Apache Kid, the Black Rider, and Kid Colt for Marvel's 1950s iteration, Atlas Comics. He later freelanced for other companies, drawing the television show spin-offs Gunsmoke and Buffalo Bill, Jr. for Dell Comics; romance comics (for Crestwood, Fawcett Comics, Nedor, Quality Comics, and St. John Publications); horror comics (for Nedor and Ace Magazines); the jungle adventure Ramar of the Jungle for (Charlton Comics); war, including Ziff Davis' G.I. Joe, and others. He continued to draw for Dell in particular through the early 1960s.

=== DC Comics ===
The Brave and the Bold #28 (March 1960): Debut of the Justice League. Cover art by Sekowsky and inker Murphy Anderson.

In 1952, Sekowsky began working at DC Comics, where he drew romance comics and science fiction titles under the editorship of Julius Schwartz. Sekowsky drew the first appearance of Adam Strange in Showcase #17 (Nov. 1958). Sekowsky and writer Gardner Fox co-created the Justice League of America in The Brave and the Bold #28 (March 1960). After two further appearances in that title, the team received its own series which Sekowsky drew for 63 issues. Fox and Sekowsky added to the membership of the Justice League by inducting new members Green Arrow, the Atom, and Hawkman. Among the adversaries which Fox and Sekowsky introduced for the team were Amazo and Doctor Light. Justice League of America #21 and #22 (Sept. 1963) saw the first team-up of the Justice League and the Justice Society of America as well as the first use of the term "Crisis" in reference to a crossover between DC's characters. The following year's JLA team-up with the Justice Society introduced the threat of the Crime Syndicate of America of Earth-Three.

Sekowsky married his second wife, Josephine, called Pat, in October 1967.

Sekowsky and writer Bob Haney introduced B'wana Beast in Showcase #66 (Feb. 1967). In 1968, Sekowsky became the penciler of Metal Men. The following year, Sekowsky also became the writer and changed the direction of the series by having the Metal Men assume human identities. The series was canceled six issues later.

At roughly the same time, Sekowsky began working on Wonder Woman with issue #178 (Sept.-Oct. 1968), first as artist and then as writer and editor, until issue #196. His run on the series included a variety of themes, from espionage to mythological adventure. He contributed a story about Wonder Woman and Batman to The Brave and the Bold. Comics historian Mark Voger has praised Sekowsky's work from this era by noting "More than any other artist then working for DC Comics, Sekowsky...captured the look and sensibility of the late 1960s."

Sekowsky wrote and drew features for the series-tryout comic-book series Showcase during the last three years of its run. This included "The Maniaks" in Showcase #68–69 (June–August 1967) and #71 (December 1967) and "Jason's Quest", an adventure series about a young man on a motorcycle searching for his family, in Showcase #88–90 (Feb.–May 1970). He became the writer/artist of the Supergirl feature in Adventure Comics as of issue #397 (Sept. 1970) and frequently disregarded continuity by scripting stories which contradicted DC's canon.

=== Later career ===
Upon leaving DC, Sekowsky returned to Marvel, where he had gotten his start in the 1940s. From 1971 to 1975, he sporadically provided penciling for stories in Amazing Adventures vol. 2, featuring the Inhumans; and Giant-Size Super-Villain Team-Up.

Sekowsky and writer Greg Weisman planned a Black Canary miniseries in 1984 for DC Comics. After the first issue was pencilled, the project went unpublished due to the character being used in writer/artist Mike Grell's Green Arrow: The Longbow Hunters series. Elements were used for Weisman's DC Showcase: Green Arrow short film. Sekowsky returned to Justice League of America to pencil a flashback tale in issue #240 (July 1985), which featured the Justice League from his era.

For the last decade of his life, Sekowsky lived in Los Angeles and worked primarily on Hanna-Barbera animated television series, including Scooby-Doo. After hospitalization with health problems stemming from diabetes, he began freelancing for publisher Daerrick Gross, who was developing a line of skateboard and ninja comics. Sekowsky died before he could complete the assignment.

== Awards ==
Sekowsky won a 1963 Alley Award for Favorite Novel ("Crisis on Earths 1 and 2" in Justice League of America #21 and #22 with Gardner Fox) and a 1981 Inkpot Award.

== Bibliography ==
=== DC Comics ===
- Adventure Comics #397–402, 404–409, 421–423 (Supergirl); #426–427 (Vigilante) (1970–1973)
- All-Star Western #114–116 (1960)
- Atom #38 (1968)
- Bat Lash #6 (1969)
- Blackhawk #267, 273 (1984)
- The Brave and the Bold #28–30 (Justice League of America); #66, 68, 76, 87 (1960–1969)
- Captain Carrot and His Amazing Zoo Crew! #6, 8, 10 (1982)
- DC 100 Page Super Spectacular #5 (1971)
- Detective Comics #371, 374–376 (Elongated Man backup stories) (1968)
- Falling In Love #3–4, 9–11, 13–15, 18–19, 21, 23, 28–31, 33, 35, 39, 42, 44, 46–47, 49–50, 52–57, 60, 62, 64–67, 69, 71–74, 79, 84, 87 (1956–1966)
- Forbidden Tales of Dark Mansion #12 (1973)
- G.I. Combat #132–133, 162 (1968–1973)
- Girls' Love Stories #38, 44, 54, 68–69, 72–73, 80, 82, 87, 90, 92–93, 96–97, 99–100, 102, 104, 110–111, 124, 141, 179 (1955–1973)
- Girls' Romances #17, 21, 23, 30, 33, 39, 41–43, 66, 72, 75, 79, 83, 85, 91, 93–94, 96, 99, 102–194, 106, 110, 116, 122, 140, 149, 156, 159 (1952–1971)
- Green Lantern #4, 64–66, 170 (1961–1983)
- Heart Throbs #50, 52, 55–56, 61–64, 68, 71–72, 78–81, 83–88, 90, 96, 102 (1957–1966)
- House of Mystery #198, 202, 206, 224, 282 (1972–1980)
- House of Secrets #100, 113, 127 (1972–1975)
- Inferior Five #1–6 (1967–1968)
- Justice League of America #1–38, 40–47, 49–57, 59–63, 240 (1960–1968, 1985)
- Love Stories #149–151 (1973)
- Metal Men #32–41 (1968–1969)
- Mystery in Space #47, 49, 51–52, 55–58, 66, 68–69 (1958–1961)
- Phantom Stranger vol. 2 #5–6, 9 (1970)
- Plop! #5–6 (1974)
- Secret Hearts #37, 41–42, 44, 46, 48, 51, 60, 65–66, 71, 79, 81–83, 85, 87–91, 93, 95, 102, 104, 115, 120, 123, 135 (1956–1969)
- Secrets of Sinister House #5, 14 (1972–1973)
- Sensation Comics #109 (1952)
- Showcase #17–19 (Adam Strange); #21 (Rip Hunter); #66–67 (B'wana Beast); #68–69, 71 (The Maniaks); #88–90 (Jason's Quest); #90–93 (Manhunter) (1958–1970)
- Strange Adventures #97–98, 101–105, 109–112, 114, 116, 118–120, 122, 124–125, 128–129, 131–132, 134, 136–138, 140, 143, 146, 149, 152, 155, 158, 162 (1958–1964)
- Supergirl #6 (1973)
- Superman's Pal Jimmy Olsen #152–153 (1972)
- Weird War Tales #36, 75 (1975–1979)
- The Witching Hour #44 (1974)
- Wonder Woman #178–196 (1968–1971)
- Young Love #41, 45, 58 (1964–1966)
- Young Romance #125–129, 132–133, 154–156 (1963–1968)

=== Gold Key Comics ===
- The Twilight Zone #4 (1963)

=== Marvel Comics ===
- Actual Confessions #14 (1952)
- Actual Romances #1–2 (1949–1950)
- Adventures into Terror #1, 3–4 (1950–1951)
- All Teen #20 (1947)
- All-True Crime #47 (1951)
- All Western Winners #3 (1949)
- All Winners Comics #3 (1942)
- Amazing Adventures #9–10 (Inhumans) (1971–1972)
- Amazing Comics #1 (1944)
- Amazing Detective Cases #12 (1952)
- Apache Kid #1 (1950)
- Arrgh #1, 3 (1974–1975)
- Arrowhead #2 (1954)
- Astonishing #13 (1952)
- Battle #12, 18 (1952–1953)
- Best Love #33, 35 (1949–1950)
- Black Rider #14 (1951)
- Blackstone the Magician #2, 4 (1948)
- Blonde Phantom #19 (1948)
- Captain America Comics #11, 33, 39, 55, 60, 64 (1942–1947)
- Combat Kelly #22 (1954)
- Complete Comics #2 (1944)
- Cowboy Romances #3 (1950)
- Crazy #5 (1954)
- Crime Can't Win #4 (1951)
- Cupid #1–2 (1949–1950)
- Daring Comics #11 (1945)
- Faithful #2 (1950)
- Frankie Comics #8 (1947)
- Georgie Comics #10–17, 26 (1947–1950)
- Giant-Size Super-Villain Team-Up #2 (1975)
- Girl Comics #3 (1950)
- Girl Confessions #20–21 (1952)
- Human Torch #20–21, 26–27, 29–34 (1945–1049)
- Jeanie Comics #13, 17 (1947–1948)
- Journey into Unknown Worlds #4–5, 9, 21 (1951–1953)
- Junior Miss #1, 36 (1944–1949)
- Justice #20, 41 (1951–1953)
- Lawbreakers Always Lose #2 (1948)
- Love Adventures #9 (1952)
- Love Classics #1-2 (1949-1950)
- Love Dramas #2 (1950)
- Love Romances #8 (1949)
- Love Romances #11-13, 20, 23, 25, 48 (1950-1955)
- Love Secrets #1-2 (1949-1950)
- Love Tales #37, 39, 41, 50-51 (1949-1952)
- Lovers #40, 43, 51-52, 80-81 (1952-1956)
- Man Comics #6 (1951)
- Margie Comics #45 (1949)
- Marvel Mystery Comics #47-48, 55, 81, 84-90, 92 (1943-1949)
- Marvel Tales #96, 98 (1950)
- Men in Action #9 (1952)
- Millie the Model #5, 7 (1947)
- Miss America #22 (1949)
- My Diary #1-2 (1949-1950)
- My Love #1, 3 (1949)
- My Love vol. 2 #16-17 (1972)
- My Own Romance #5-6, 9-12, 15, 19-23, 29, 31, 33 (1949-1953)
- Mystery Tales #11, 44 (1953-1956)
- Mystic #1-2, 4-5 (1951)
- Mystic Comics #9 (1942)
- Mystic Comics vol. 2 #3-4 (1944-1945)
- Namora #2-3 (1948)
- Our Love #1(1949)
- Our Love Story #16 (1972)
- Patsy Walker #11-20 (1947-1949)
- Romance Tales #7, 9 (1949-1950)
- Secret Story Romances #3 (1954)
- Spaceman #4 (1954)
- Spellbound #5-6, 9 (1952)
- Sport Stars #1 (1949)
- Spy Cases #3, 15 (1951-1953)
- Spy Fighters #2 (1951)
- Strange Tales #3, 9, 11, 14, 16 (1951-1953)
- Sub-Mariner Comics #26-28 (1948)
- Suspense #11, 14 (1951-1952)
- Teen Comics #21 (1947)
- Tough Kid Squad Comics #1 (1942)
- True Adventures #3 (1950)
- True Life Tales #1-2 (1949-1050_
- True Secrets #16, 18-19, 23 (1952-1954)
- Two-Gun Kid #3 (1948)
- Uncanny Tales #11, 25, 46 (1953-1956)
- U.S.A. Comics #4-6, 10 (1942-1943)
- Venus #5, 6, 9 (1949-1950)
- War Action #11 (1953)
- War Adventures #12 (1953)
- War Comics #5, 16 (1951-1953)
- Western Life Romances #1-2 (1949-1950)
- Wild Western #23, 29 (1952-1953)
- Willie Comics #5, 7, 10-12, 16, 19 (1946-1949)
- Young Allies #11-12, 16, 18 (1944-1945)
- Young Hearts #1 (1949)
- Young Men #5, 17 (1950–1952)

=== Tower Comics ===
- Dynamo #1–2 (1966)
- T.H.U.N.D.E.R. Agents #1–12 (1965–1967)

Preceded by n/a	Justice League of America artist 1960–1968	Succeeded by Dick Dillin
Preceded by Win Mortimer	Wonder Woman artist 1968–1971	Succeeded by Don Heck
Preceded by Dennis O'Neil	Wonder Woman writer 1969–1971	Succeeded by Dennis O'Neil
Preceded by Robert Kanigher	"Supergirl" feature in Adventure Comics writer 1970–1971	Succeeded by John Albano
Preceded by Win Mortimer and Kurt Schaffenberger	"Supergirl" feature in Adventure Comics artist 1970–1972	Succeeded by Tony DeZuniga
