= Vince Colletta =

American comic book artist (1923–1991)

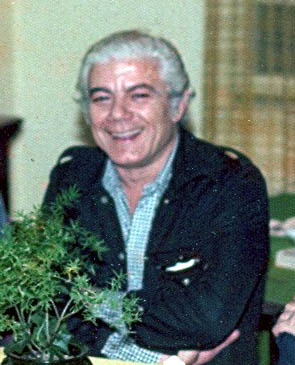
- Born: Vincent Colletta; October 15, 1923 Casteldaccia, Italy
- Died: June 3, 1991 (aged 67) Westwood, New Jersey, U.S.
- Areas: Penciller, Inker
- Pseudonym: Vinnie Colletta
- Notable works: Thor; Wonder Woman

Vincenzo Colletta (October 15, 1923 – June 3, 1991) was an American comic book artist and art director. He was one of Jack Kirby's frequent inkers during the 1950s-1960s Silver Age of comic books. This included some significant early issues of Marvel Comics' Fantastic Four, and a long, celebrated run on the character Thor in Journey into Mystery and The Mighty Thor.

== Early life ==
Vincente Colletta was born in Casteldaccia, Sicily, the son of Rosa and Francesco "Frank" Colletta, the latter "a pretty high-level Mafioso", according to family lore. Colletta Sr emigrated from Sicily to escape local law enforcement and settled in Brooklyn, New York City, where his wife and child joined him 10 years later. The family then moved to New Jersey and opened an Italian market, severing any ties to the Mafia.

Vince Colletta served in the Army Air Corps during World War II; he served in the South Pacific and Guam, and according to his son "his art graced the side of many USAF bombers." After he was discharged, he attended the New Jersey Academy of Fine Arts.

== Career ==
Atlas Comics' Secret Story #7 (June 1954). Cover art by Colletta (signed)

Colletta entered comics in 1952, freelancing first as a penciler, inking his own work, for the publisher Better Publications, on the titles Intimate Love and Out of the Shadows, and for publisher Youthful Magazines' imprint Pix-Parade, on the title Daring Love.

The following year he began his decades-long collaboration with Marvel, at the company's 1950s iteration, Atlas Comics. Primarily a romance comics artist, he drew dozens of stories and covers for the Atlas titles Love Romances, Lovers, My Own Romance, Stories of Romance, and The Romances of Nurse Helen Grant, with his earliest confirmed Atlas romance art the six-page story "My Love for You" in Love Romances #37 (March 1954). Colletta's work also appeared in such genres as jungle adventure (Jungle Action, Jann of the Jungle, Lorna, the Jungle Girl) and horror/fantasy (Uncanny Tales, Journey into Mystery).

During an Atlas retrenchment in the late 1950s, Colletta freelanced as a penciler on the DC Comics romance titles Falling in Love, Girls' Love Stories, and Heart Throbs, and Charlton Comics' Love Diary and Teen Confessions. His last confirmed pencil work for decades was "I Can't Marry Now" in Love Diary #6 (Sept. 1959).

Colletta's first work as an inker of another artist's pencils is unknown, largely due to credits not being given routinely in 1950s comics. Two possibilities suggested by historians and researchers are the cover of Atlas' Annie Oakley Western Tales #10 (April 1956), co-inking with Sol Brodsky over Brodsky's pencils, and the three-page story "I Met My Love Again", penciled by Matt Baker, in My Own Romance #65 (Sept. 1958). Additionally assigned to ink stories in Atlas' emerging science-fiction/fantasy and giant-monster comics, Colletta entered what fans and historians call "pre-superhero Marvel" with three Baker-penciled stories: "The Green Fog" in Journey into Mystery #50 (Jan. 1959), "I Fell to the Center of the Earth" in Tales to Astonish #2 (March 1959), and "The Brain Picker" in World of Fantasy #17 (April 1959).

Historians pinpoint Colletta's first inking of Jack Kirby's pencils as either the cover of Kid Colt: Outlaw #100 (Sept. 1961) or (with Colletta's credit confirmed), the cover of Love Romances #98 (March 1962).

Members of artist Wally Wood's studio were among those who assisted or ghosted on Colletta's mid-1960s Charlton stories. Artists who assisted or ghosted through Colletta's own studio included Maurice Whitman in 1964, Hy Eisman from 1960 to 1964, and at various times Matt Baker, Dick Giordano, and Joe Sinnott, as well as Kyle Baker.

=== Marvel Comics ===
The Mighty Thor #126 (March 1966), the debut after its retitling from Journey into Mystery. Art by Jack Kirby and Colletta

As an inker for Marvel in the 1960s, Colletta worked on nearly every title, including some of the earliest issues of Daredevil. He inked Kirby's Fantastic Four #40–44, as well as Fantastic Four Annual #3, featuring the wedding of Reed Richards and Susan Storm and guest-starring virtually all the major Marvel Comics characters of the time.

Colletta began his six-year run on Kirby's "The Mighty Thor" feature with the "Tales of Asgard" backup in Journey into Mystery #106 (July 1964). Colletta graduated to the lead feature with #116 (May 1965). He continued through the book's retitling to The Mighty Thor with #126 (March 1966), and except for one issue (#143), inked it through #167 (Aug. 1969), picking up again from #176 (May 1970) to Kirby's final issue, #179 (Aug. 1970), inking John Buscema in #178. Colletta also inked Journey into Mystery Annual #1 (1965), which introduced Hercules to the Marvel universe, and The Mighty Thor King-Size Annual #2.

Historians and critics consider Colletta's Thor work to be a creative highlight. Historian Nick Simon said, "For me, the Kirby/Colletta version of Thor is the definitive one." Author and Silver Age of Comic Books historian Pierre Comtois wrote that,

. . . Colletta's hair-thin, detailed inking style . . . seemed devoid of large areas of black, [which are] used to give figures weight and heft but an artistic concept yet to be fully explored by the time of the Middle Ages, an era whose crude woodcuts most reflected the art style needed by the Thor strip[. It] captured the elusive quality of otherworldly drama that the strip would increasingly demand as [Stan] Lee and [Jack] Kirby took it away from the everyday world of supervillains to a mythic plane where the forces of evil were on a far more gargantuan scale. Despite the serendipity of the two men's styles, Colletta would later be criticized, with good reason, for compromising Kirby's artistic vision by eliminating much of the detail that the artist put into his work. Be that as it may, what Colletta chose to keep, he rendered in such a way that showed off aspects of Kirby's art that no inker before or since has ever been able to reproduce.

Colletta would also pencil stories in many 1960s issues of Charlton Comics' Teen-Age Love and First Kiss (at least some of which has been credited in reprints as by "Vince Colletta Studio"). He occasionally inked romance stories penciled by Joe Sinnott, and other pencilers on such titles as Charlton's Gunmaster, and Dell Comics' Guerrilla War, Jungle War Stories, and Western series Idaho.

=== DC Comics ===
Mister Miracle #3 (Aug. 1971). Art by Kirby & Colletta

In 1970, Colletta — who had been freelancing for DC Comics since 1968 on the romance titles Falling In Love, Girls' Love Stories, Secret Hearts and Young Romance, stepped up his inking for the company following Jack Kirby's move there from Marvel Comics. Colletta inked Kirby's two black-and-white magazine one-shots, In the Days of the Mob and Spirit World (both Oct. 1971), and the initial issues of Kirby's Superman's Pal, Jimmy Olsen and "Fourth World" titles: The Forever People, Mister Miracle and The New Gods. While Colletta's rates were good and he brought "an innocent Marvel Age look to Jack's new heroes", he was prone to "erasing background characters" and transforming "[b]ustling crowd scenes [into] easier silhouettes". Kirby assistant Mark Evanier and inker Wally Wood eventually convinced a reluctant Kirby to ask DC Publisher Carmine Infantino to remove Colletta from inking Kirby's titles. He was replaced by inker Mike Royer, causing some fans to write to DC in complaint, denouncing Kirby for "abandoning the Marvel-style look". Colletta's frequent assistant Art Cappello did much of the background inking on these comics.

Colletta went on to ink a large array at DC, including a variety of Batman, Superman and Green Lantern titles; the TV tie-in series Isis and Super Friends; and nearly every issue of Wonder Woman from #206 (July 1973) to #270 (Aug. 1980), over pencilers including Don Heck, Dick Dillin, Curt Swan, José Delbo and Michael Netzer (Nasser).

He was named DC's art director in May 1976, resigning the post in May 1979. His time there included discovering future industry star Frank Miller. As one-time Marvel editor-in-chief Jim Shooter described, Miller had broken in with "a small job from Western Publishing, I think. Thus emboldened, he went to DC, and after getting savaged by Joe Orlando, got in to see art director Vinnie Colletta, who recognized talent and arranged for him to get a one-page war-comic job".

Before and after his tenure, Colletta continued to do a small amount of inking for Marvel, as well as for Skywald Publications' black-and-white horror magazine Psycho. Well into the 1980s, Colletta continued to ink a wide assortment of comics for both DC and Marvel. His last known credit is a Marvel humor one-shot, Fred Hembeck Destroys the Marvel Universe (July 1989).

In late 1987, after editor-in-chief Jim Shooter was fired from Marvel, Colletta sent Marvel a scathing, profanity-laced letter highly critical of the company's action, which became widely circulated.

== Analysis ==
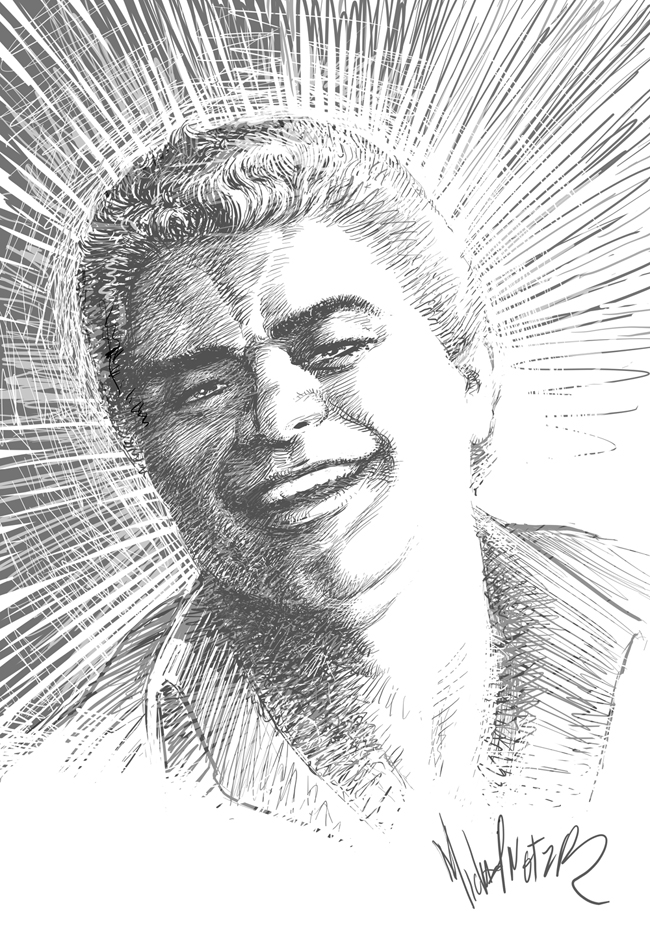
Vince Colletta by Michael Netzer

Colletta was regarded as one of the American comics industry's fastest inkers and a reliable professional to call upon when a comic was in danger of missing a printing deadline. He nonetheless has been criticized by a range of fellow professionals and comic historians for erasing various details in a penciler's work, both in order to lessen the inking burden and to help meet time constraints during an industry era when printers charged then-prohibitive thousands of dollars for missed deadlines, which resulted in idle presses. As comics artist Joe Sinnott told author Marc Flores, who writes under the pen name Ronin Ro, "When I penciled the romance stories, I used to tell myself, Vince wrecked what I did. ... He would eliminate people from the strip and use silhouettes, everything to cut corners and make the work easier for himself." Writer Len Wein told an interviewer what he enjoyed most about working on Luke Cage was, "Getting to work with the wonderful George Tuska, before Vinnie Colletta got his hands on the pencils and ruined them".

Colletta was reassigned from inking The Tomb of Dracula when publisher Stan Lee determined Colletta had taken unacceptable shortcuts on issue #9. Gene Colan, penciler on the series (and on several earlier projects inked by Colletta), remarked many years later that "when he wanted to he could do very good work, but he didn't take his time with my stuff."

Jack Kirby partisans are particularly vocal. Mark Evanier said, "In 1970 when Steve Sherman and I met Steve Ditko, he asked us about the new Kirby books that were then about to debut at DC. When we told him Colletta was handling the inking, he winced and said that he would probably not look at the comics. Back when he was working for Marvel, Ditko said he'd pick up the latest issues in the office and always check the credits before taking the comics home. If he found Colletta's name — especially as Kirby's embellisher — he would make a point of putting the comic back, or even in a wastebasket. And he'd make sure Stan [Lee] saw what he was doing and knew the reason why."

Conversely, Colletta's admirers point to the speed with which Colletta was often required to work, and the results he could produce when given time. Critic Tony Seybert wrote that "for tales set in the distant past of myth and legend, Colletta's soft delicate inks evoke the vapors of ancient times [and are] just as effective on Asgardian crags as on the sylvan glades of Olympus. The Kirby/Colletta Thor is a mighty blond deity with a hint of Norse faerie-dust. Hercules is a roughly hewn sculpture, almost incomplete, like one of the unfinished prisoners of Michelangelo."

Colletta himself described his methods as a necessity of the industry. When asked to describe his philosophy of inking, he said, "Well, first of all, some inkers like to pick and choose... and they'll take their time, no matter what the deadline is, even if the editor is in a jam, or a colorist is waiting for pages to come in so they can earn a living, too. I can't be that way."

== Personal life ==
By the early 1950s, Colletta was married to his wife, Viola. The couple had a son, Franklin, and two daughters, Roseannette and Cynthia. Circa 1962, the family began living at 3 Old Woods Road, in Saddle River, New Jersey.

Some time after having recovered from a heart attack, Colletta was diagnosed with cancer; three weeks later, on June 3, 1991, aged 67, he died at Pascack Valley Hospital in Westwood, New Jersey. At least one obituary, in The Comics Journal, erroneously stated he died at age 65 and in "late June", and claimed the cause was heart disease.

== Awards ==
Colletta was posthumously awarded the Inkwell Awards Special Recognition Award in 2016. His son, Frankie, extended his thanks on the awards' official site.
