= Christopher Rule =

American comic book artist (1894–1983)

- Born: November 23, 1894
- Died: April 6, 1983 (aged 88)
- Areas: Penciller, Artist, Inker

Christopher Rule (November 23, 1894 – April 6, 1983) was an American comic book artist active from the 1940s through at least 1960, and best known as the first regular Marvel Comics inker for comics artist Jack Kirby during the period fans and historians call the Silver Age of Comic Books.

== Biography ==
=== Early life and career ===
After driving an ambulance in France during World War I, Christopher Rule in the 1920s worked in comic strips and fashion illustration. For publisher S. Gabriel & Sons, Rule and Pelagie Doane illustrated a Pinocchio "put together book" in which gummed illustrations could be cut out and mounted on background sheets.

=== Comic books ===
Strange Tales #68 (April 1959). Cover art by penciler Jack Kirby and inker Rule.

In 1943, Rule was a comic-book inker with the Jack Binder Studio, and also that year inked Fawcett Comics stories featuring the superheroes Mary Marvel and Mr. Scarlet.

By 1944 he had become a staff artist at Timely Comics, the forerunner of Marvel Comics during the period fans and historians call the Golden Age of Comic Books. Rule worked in what was called the "animator bullpen", which produced such movie tie-in and original talking animal comics as Terrytoons Comics, Mighty Mouse, and Animated Funny Comic-Tunes, and was separate from the superhero group producing comics featuring the Human Torch, the Sub-Mariner and Captain America. Due to his work going unsigned, in the manner of the times, comprehensive credits are difficult if not impossible to ascertain. Rule's first confirmed credits are as inker of the one-page fashion filler "Junior Miss Steps Out..." and as penciler-inker of an eight-page story in the teen-romance comic Junior Miss #1 (Winter 1944).

Rule continued to ink romance stories over such pencilers as George Klein, Mike Sekowsky, and Syd Shores in such comics as Faithful, Love Classics, and Love Tales. He expanded into other forms, including heroic adventure with the mythologically based superheroine Venus, inking Werner Roth on a story in Venus #10 (July 1950); and then into horror, inking penciler Sekowsky's story "Hands of Murder" in Adventures into Terror #4 (June 1951), from Marvel's 1950s iteration, Atlas Comics.

Inker Joe Giella, who worked on staff at Timely for two years beginning circa 1946, recalled Rule at the time as "a very heavy, older fellow with grayish hair. He was a good friend of Mike Sekowsky's, and worked in the same room with Mike. He was kind of an intellectual". Artist Gene Colan, a Marvel mainstay from 1946 on, described Rule as "kind of like a Santa Claus — a roly-poly guy who was very funny". Echoed artist Stan Goldberg, "He had a great gift of gab and a magnificent vocabulary. [...] He was kind of like a Santa Claus and looked very important".

== Personal life ==
In 1923, Rule married Harriet May Cassebeer, the former wife of Edwin William Cassebeer, an executive of the Steinway Corporation, and a daughter of Charles Ruthrauff. By this marriage he had one stepdaughter, Florence Louise Cassebeer (a.k.a. Florence Louise Steinway, born 1913). Atlas Comic colleague Stan Goldberg recalled that Rule's first wife died after having scalded herself.

After 1950, Rule married second wife Caryl Gilbert Bartine (née Baker, 1886–1969). By this marriage Rule had a stepson, Oliver Hunt Bartine Jr.

== Atlas and Kirby ==
Tales of Suspense #2 (March 1959). Art by Kirby & Rule.

In a rare formal credit in a comic of that period, Rule is listed as "art associate" in the Atlas Comics title Girls' Life #4 (July 1954), under "editorial and art director" Stan Lee. In that or a similar staff capacity throughout the 1950s, Rule inked in a variety of genres and forms, with known work that includes medieval adventure, inking Syd Shores' Black Knight and Crusader stories in Black Knight #5 (Dec. 1955); Westerns, inking Shores in Six-Gun Western #2 (March 1957); biography, drawing the feature "Famous Explorers of Space" in the successively named Space Squadron / Space Worlds; and science fiction/fantasy, drawing a story each in Strange Tales #49 (Aug. 1956) and World of Fantasy #9 & #15 (Dec. 1957 & Dec. 1958), and inking Shores yet again in World of Suspense #6 (Feb. 1957). In a rare switch, Rule penciled a story that someone else (Vince Colletta) inked, in My Own Romance #63 (May 1958).

Rule inked the first stories of industry great Jack Kirby when Kirby returned to the company for a long-term stay for the first time since 1941, when he had co-created Captain America with Joe Simon. Rule inked Kirby's premiere Atlas/Marvel cover and the accompanying seven-page story "I Discovered the Secret of the Flying Saucers" in Strange Worlds #1 (Dec. 1958), Rule would remain Kirby's regular, nearly exclusive inker on these "pre-superhero Marvel" stories as Atlas Comics segued into Marvel Comics, at which point Dick Ayers would become Kirby's most frequent inker during the company's early years.

Rule as well inked the prolific Kirby on Western stories in Gunsmoke Western #51 and Kid Colt: Outlaw #86 (Sept. 1959), romance stories in Love Romances #85 (Jan. 1960), and war stories in Battle #66-67 (Oct.-Dec. 1959), plus many covers across all genres. Rule's last known confirmed credit is inking Kirby on the five-page story "What Was the Strange Power of Simon Drudd?" in Tales to Astonish #10 (Jan. 1960).

Some comics historians theorize he may have been an inker on some portion of Kirby's landmark comic The Fantastic Four #1 (Nov. 1961), for which George Klein is generally recognized as the uncredited inker. The standard Grand Comics Database, for example, lists the inker credit as "George Klein?; Christopher Rule? ... George Klein, or Chris Rule have been suggested as the inker but there is no consensus." Others note the long lag time between Rule's last confirmed credit and the Fantastic Four premiere.

== Bibliography ==
Rule inked Jack Kirby on stories in comics including:

- Journey into Mystery # 51–52, 54 & 56 (March–May, Sept. 1959 & Jan. 1960)
- Strange Tales # 67-70 (Feb.-Aug. 1959)
- Strange Worlds # 3 (Aug. 1959)
- Tales of Suspense # 2-4 & 6 (March–July & Nov. 1959)
- Tales to Astonish # 1 & 5-6 (Jan. & Sept.-Nov. 1959), and
- World of Fantasy # 15-16 & 18 (Dec. 1958 - Feb. & June 1959)
