= Tom Gill (artist) =

American comic book artist

- Born: Thomas P. Gill; June 3, 1913 Brooklyn, New York City, New York
- Died: October 17, 2005 (aged 92) Croton-on-Hudson, New York
- Areas: Penciller, Inker
- Notable works: The Lone Ranger

Thomas P. Gill (June 3, 1913 – October 17, 2005) was an American comic book artist best known for his nearly 11-year run drawing Dell Comics' The Lone Ranger.

== Biography ==
=== Early life and career ===
Tom Gill was born in Brooklyn, New York City, New York, and began his career as a staff artist with the New York City newspaper the Daily News, where he drew the first map of the Japanese attack on Pearl Harbor. He also worked for the Herald-Tribune and the Times. His earliest known comic book work was penciling and inking the five-page story "The Scientist's Haunted House" for the feature "K-51 Spies At War" in Fox Comics' Wonderworld Comics #13 (May 1940). Other early comics work includes Novelty Press' Blue Bolt Comics, from 1944 to 1946, and Target Comics in the mid-1940s. He is also tentatively identified on three stories for Fiction House's Jungle Comics in 1941, and drew occasionally for that publisher's Wings Comics in the mid-1940s.

With an unknown writer, he co-created the Native American Western character Red Warrior, who starred in a namesake comic-book series for Atlas Comics, the 1950s iteration of Marvel Comics. He drew the majority of the stories for the six-issue series (Jan.-Dec. 1951), and all covers except the last.

=== The Lone Ranger and other Westerns ===
Beginning with Dell Comics' The Lone Ranger #38 (Aug. 1951) — the first issue of that title with original stories rather than reprints of the Fran Striker-Charles Flanders newspaper comic-strip — Gill and writer Paul S. Newman teamed for a nearly 11-year run chronicling the stories of that old-time radio and later television Western hero. Gill drew every issue through though #145 (July 1962), a 107-issue run that marks one of the longest of any artist on a comic-book series.

The series had been produced by Western Publishing and published by its business partner, Dell. After severing ties, Western established its own comic-book imprint, Gold Key Comics, which launched its own Lone Ranger title. This reprinted Newman-Gill material from the Dell run for its first 21 issues (Sept. 1964 - June 1975), after which it published new material by other creators through the final issue, #28 (March 1977).

Gill's other comic-book work includes the spin-off The Lone Ranger's Famous Horse Hi-Yo Silver ; the TV-Western tie-in Bonanza, and the equine-series tie-in Fury; the six-issue Native American-hero Western Red Warrior (Jan.-Dec. 1951) for Atlas Comics, the 1950s precursor of Marvel Comics; and, with writer Jerry Siegel, the sole two issues (April 1967 & April 1968) of Gold Key's self-consciously camp revival of creator Frank Thomas' 1940 character The Owl.

Working from his studio on Long Island and never venturing West, Gill gained his facility for drawing horses, he said, from "a $1 book called How to Draw Horses: It's Fun and It's Easy. In that same interview, he explained his philosophy of drawing the Lone Ranger's famed white steed: "You had to make Silver a glamour horse. His head was always high, his mane was always flying.""

=== Cartooning and children's books ===
Gill also drew a 1948 comic strip, Ricky Stevens, and comic books for Harvey Comics and Toby Press. For Western Publishing, he additionally illustrated children's books and such projects as The Man from U.N.C.L.E. TV tie-in books and activity books.

For roughly 50 years, Gill taught cartooning and children's-book illustration in New York-area colleges and institutions, including the School of Visual Arts, where he served as a department chair in 1948, alumni director in 1969, and consultant well into the 21st century. He served several terms as vice-president of the National Cartoonists Society, winning its Silver T-Square award in 1964 and its Best Story Comic Book Artist award in 1970.

With Tim Lasiuta, he wrote the autobiography Misadventures of A Roving Cartoonist: The Lone Ranger's Secret Sidekick (Five Star Publications, 2008)

=== Later life ===
Gill lost his eyesight later in life but continued to teach art at community colleges. Gill died of heart failure at his home in Croton-on-Hudson, New York. He was survived by family including wife Patricia, daughter Nancy Zaglaluer, and son Tom Gill.

== Awards ==
- 2004 Inkpot Award.
