= My Own Romance =

Comic book

My Own Romance is a comic book title originally published by Timely Comics beginning in 1948 to 1951 and later by Atlas Comics from 1951 to 1961, and published by Marvel Comics until 1962.

== Publication history ==
The title began publication as My Romance #1–3 (Sep 1948 – Jan 1949), and was renamed My Own Romance with issues #4–18 (Mar 1949 – Sep 1951) published by Timely, and issues #19–76 (Nov 1951 – Jul 1960) published by Atlas, and the title and continued as Teen-Age Romance #77–81 (Sep 1960 – May 1961), and issues #82-86 were published by Marvel Comics.

Vince Colletta worked at Atlas Comics primarily as a romance comics artist, he drew dozens of stories and covers for the Atlas titles Love Romances, Lovers, My Own Romance, Stories of Romance, and The Romances of Nurse Helen Grant.

Matt Baker drew stories prolifically for the romance comics of Atlas, namely Love Romances, My Own Romance, and Teen-Age Romance.

Jay Scott Pike was a regular Atlas Comics contributor, drawing in a variety of genres for such titles as the romance comics, including Girl Confessions, Love Romances, Love Tales, My Own Romance, Secret Story Romance, and True Secrets.

Don Heck contributed to such Atlas/Marvel romance comics as Love Romances and My Own Romance.

The earliest confirmed comic-book work for Pete Tumlinson is penciling "I Hate My Husband!", an eight-page story (either co-penciled with or inked by George Klein) in the Timely Comics romance title My Own Romance #7 (July 1949).

In a rare switch, Christopher Rule penciled a story that someone else (Vince Colletta) inked, in My Own Romance #63 (May 1958).

The title featured art from comics industry notables such as Bob Brown, John Buscema, Gene Colan, Gil Kane, Jack Kirby, Joe Orlando, John Romita Sr., Mike Sekowsky, Alex Toth, and George Tuska.

Al Williamson's works from My Own Romance #71 were reprinted in the 2004 collection Al Williamson: Hidden Lands from Dark Horse Comics.

Material from (some covers only) My Own Romance (1949) #71–76 and Teen-Age Romance (1960) #84–86 were included in the 2021 collection The Complete Kirby War and Romance.
