= Hank Chapman =

American comic book writer (1915–1973)

- Born: Henry Peter Chapman; May 3, 1915 Utica, New York, U.S.
- Died: October 18, 1973 (aged 58) Tesuque, New Mexico, U.S.
- Area: Writer
- Notable works: war comics

Henry Peter Chapman (May 3, 1915 – October 18, 1973), credited in comics under both his formal name and as Hank Chapman, was an American comic book writer for Marvel Comics' two predecessors, Timely Comics and Atlas Comics, and later for DC Comics, where he specialized in war fiction. Though much of his Timely/Atlas work went unsigned, comics historians estimate that Chapman, a staff writer, penned several hundred or more stories.

Among Chapman's works is an early self-reflexive comic-book story, in 1951, in which he and editor Stan Lee appear; and the creation, with artist Jack Abel, of the DC Comics character Sgt. Mule, a pack animal that helped its Allied keepers fight the Nazis in a variety of World War II stories.

== Career ==
Chapman's earliest known credit is as one of the many Golden Age of comic books professionals who contributed to the epic crossover battle between the Sub-Mariner and the original Human Torch in Marvel Mystery Comics #8–10 (June–Aug. 1940), plus an additional story in The Human Torch No. 5 (Fall 1941; due to a numbering quirk, there was a previous No. 5, cover-dated Summer 1941). His precise contributions are as lost to history as those of other writers and artists who legendarily collaborated on this hastily created confrontation. As described by historian Jess Nevins, Sub-Mariner creator Bill Everett and Human Torch creator Carl Burgos...

...brainstormed the story and then gave them to two writers, John Compton and Hank Chapman, to finish. Whether Everett & Burgos were the only ones to create this story remains, as do so many other questions about this time in comics' history, in dispute. [Timely Comics publisher] Martin Goodman seems to have had input into the crossover; he seems not to have been behind the idea, but seems to have influenced the content of the stories".

Stan Lee and Hank Chapman appear as versions of themselves in Chapman's four-page story "The Nightmare" (Astonishing No. 4, June 1951). Art by either Wayne Boring or Al Plastino (sources differ).

By the following decade, Chapman was one of at least five staff writers (officially titled editors) under editor-in-chief Stan Lee at Marvel forerunner Atlas, along with Ernie Hart, Paul S. Newman, Don Rico, Carl Wessler, and, on teen-humor comics, future Mad Magazine cartoonist Al Jaffee. Among the titles for which Chapman wrote, beginning in early 1951, are the horror/fantasy series Adventures into Terror, Adventures into Weird Worlds, Astonishing, Marvel Tales, Mystery Tales, Spellbound, Strange Tales, Suspense, and Uncanny Tales; the war titles Battle, Battle Action, Battlefield, Battlefront, Battle Brady, Combat Casey, Combat, War Action, War Adventures, War Combat and War Comics; the Westerns Red Warrior and The Texas Kid; the adventure-drama series Girl Comics, Man Comics, Men's Adventures, and Young Men; the crime fiction series Crime Exposed and Justice; the romance titles True Secrets Love Romances; and such miscellanea as Sports Action, and Speed Carter, Spaceman.

Chapman's last known Atlas works were in comics cover-dated May 1954. His next known credit is a story in the DC anthology title All-American Men of War No. 18 (Feb. 1955), followed by four years without recorded credits until his name surfaced in two June 1959 DC titles, G.I. Combat No. 73 and Our Fighting Forces No. 46. These would be the first of at least 105 war stories he would write in those comics along with Our Army at War, Sea Devils, Capt. Storm, and Star Spangled War Stories.

His and artist Jack Abel's character Sgt. Mule – whose name, "Millie", meant she was actually not a mule (male) but a hinny (female) — appeared with various keepers including Private Mulvaney (Our Army at War No. 149 & 160, Star Spangled War Stories #136); Private Skinner (G.I. Combat #104); and Private Smith (Our Army at War #117).

Chapman's last recorded credit is the story "Paper Bullets", with artist Abel, in Our Army at War No. 181 (June 1967).

== Personal life and death ==
Chapman was married to Bonnie Abraham, a production staffer at Atlas. The two later separated, and Bonnie married Arnold Hano. He left comics to become a magazine writer for Boys' Life, in 1964, and for travel magazines.

Chapman died in Tesuque, New Mexico on October 18, 1973, at the age of 58. He was survived by his second wife, Toni.

== Known reprints ==
Chronological by date of original publication

- Monsters on the Prowl No. 21 (Feb. 1973)

"The Drop of Water" (art: Gene Colan), from Marvel Tales No. 105 (Feb. 1952)

- Crypt of Shadows No. 4 (July 1973)

"Locked up!" (art: Carmine Infantino), from Adventures into Weird Worlds No. 9 (Aug. 1952)

- G.I. Combat No. 148 (July 1971)

"Blind Bomber" (art: Mort Drucker), from Star Spangled War Stories No. 84 (Aug. 1959)

- DC Special Series No. 18 (Fall 1979)

"Frogman Fury" (art: Ross Andru & Mike Esposito), from Our Army at War No. 102 (Jan. 1961)

- G.I. Combat No. 146 (March 1972)

"The Secret Battle Eye" (art: Joe Kubert), from Our Fighting Forces No. 66 (Feb. 1962)

- Our Fighting Forces No. 133 (Oct. 1971)

"No Place for a PT Boat" (art: Joe Kubert), from Our Fighting Forces #76 (May 1963)

- G.I. Combat #144 (Nov. 1971)

"Straw Pilot" (art: Joe Kubert), from Our Army at War #147 (Oct. 1964)
