= Lovers (comic book) =

Lovers is a comic book title originally published by Timely Comics beginning in 1949 to 1951 and later by Atlas Comics until 1957.

== Publication history ==
The title began publication as All Select Comics which ran 11 issues, cover-dated Fall 1943 to Fall 1945. The series was renamed Blonde Phantom Comics from issues #12–22 (1947 – March 1949), and revamped and changed titles and formats completely to become the anthological romance comic Lovers from #23-86 (May 1949 – Aug. 1957).

Vince Colletta worked at Atlas Comics primarily as a romance comics artist, he drew dozens of stories and covers for the Atlas titles Love Romances, Lovers, My Own Romance, Stories of Romance, and The Romances of Nurse Helen Grant.

The title featured art from comics industry notables such as Bob Brown, Gene Colan, Joe Kubert, and Mike Sekowsky.
