= Millie the Model =

Comic book series

- Millie the Model #40 (Spring 1953), cover art by Dan DeCarlo

Publication information
- Publisher: Marvel Comics
- Format: Ongoing series
- Publication date: August 1945 – December 1973
- No. of issues: 207
- Main character(s): Millie Collins; Chili Storm; Toni Turner

Creative team
- Created by: Ruth Atkinson
- Written by: Ruth Atkinson; Ken Bald; Stan Lee
- Artist(s): Ruth Atkinson; Mike Sekowsky; Dan DeCarlo; Stan Goldberg

Millie the Model is Marvel Comics' longest-running humor title, first published by the company's 1940s predecessor, Timely Comics, and continuing through its 1950s forerunner, Atlas Comics, to 1970s Marvel. The comic book series deals with Millie Collins, an aspiring model working for the Hanover Modeling Agency.

== Publication history ==
The Millie the Model series ran 207 issues (cover dated Winter 1945 to December 1973), a 28-year span that included one of the first Marvel Comics annuals (1962), and spin-offs including A Date with Millie, Life with Millie, Mad About Millie and Modeling with Millie.

At first book about New York City model Millie Collins, it very quickly changed into a wider, more slapstick comedy, although for a time becoming a romantic adventure series with all the same characters (#113–153, March 1963 – August 1967), before returning to humor. Both the trademarked cover title and the copyrighted title as per its postal indicia are Millie the Model Comics through issue #94. The cover title then becomes simply Millie the Model, although the copyrighted title did not change to match until issue #144.

The character was created by writer-artist Ruth Atkinson, one of the pioneering women cartoonists in comic books. Following this first issue, subsequent early stories were drawn mostly by Timely staffer Mike Sekowsky.

Millie the Model #151 (July 1967), during the humor series' four-year romance-comic iteration; cover art by Ogden Whitney.

The character's essential look, however, was the work of future Archie Comics's Dan DeCarlo, who would later create Josie and the Pussycats and other Archie icons. DeCarlo's 10-year run on the series, from #18–93 (June 1949 – November 1959), was succeeded by the team of writer Stan Lee and artist Stan Goldberg, a.k.a. "Stan G.", the main Atlas / Marvel colorist at the time. Goldberg mimicked the house style DeCarlo set, and later went on to work with him at Archie, as did occasional Millie artist Henry Scarpelli. Al Hartley and Ogden Whitney provided an occasional cover.

The occasional backup feature included a four-page "Powerhouse Pepper" story by cartoonist Basil Wolverton in #9, and work by humorist Harvey Kurtzman in #8, 10–11, 13–14, & 16. Lee and Goldberg had Marvel artist and major industry figure Jack Kirby guest-star in a story in #107 (March 1962), though the image itself did not look like Kirby.

Millie became part of the Marvel Universe with Fantastic Four Annual #3 (1965), which chronicled the wedding of Reed Richards and Susan Storm. Fellow humor-comic stars Patsy Walker and Hedy Wolfe, among the sidewalk crowd outside, talk about wanting to catch a glimpse of celebrity Millie, whom they have heard is on the guest list. Alex Ross depicted her at the ceremony when he revisited the wedding in the 1990s miniseries Marvels.

She reappeared in the 1980s as an older character running her own modeling agency and minding her niece, the titular star of writer-artist Trina Robbins' Misty (December 1985 – May 1986), from Marvel's children's-oriented Star Comics imprint. Millie has also appeared in the superhero comics The Defenders #65 (November 1978), Dazzler #34 (October 1985), The Sensational She-Hulk #60 (February 1994), and in the kitschy flashback series The Age of the Sentry #3 (January 2009).

Millie starred alongside Patsy Walker and Mary Jane Watson in a 23-page story "Un-enchanted Evening", by writer Paul Tobin and artist Colleen Coover, in King-Size Spider-Man Summer Special #1 (October 2008). Millie stars in the four-issue miniseries Models, Inc. (October 2009 – January 2010). She appeared in the 2019 Fearless anthology series.

== Fictional character biography ==
Millie the Model

Publication information
- Publisher: Marvel Comics
- First appearance: Millie the Model Comics #1 (August 1945)
- Created by: Ruth Atkinson

In-story information
- Alter ego: Millicent Collins
- Species: Human
- Notable aliases: Blonde Bombshell; Millie the Marvel
- Abilities: Skilled business executive; Expert model and actress

Aspiring model Millicent "Millie" Collins of Sleepy Gap, Kansas, moves to New York. She meets photographer Clicker (originally Flicker) Holbrook who arranges an introduction at the Hanover Modelling Agency. She is hired as a model by the agency. At the start of the series her best friend was regular character Toni Turner; later on Toni became a recurring character, and her role as best friend and confidant was Daisy, the agency's wardrobe assistant. She becomes romantically involved with Clicker Holbrook. At one point, she shares an apartment on the East Side of Manhattan with Toni Turner. Near the end of the series, Millie and Daisy shared an apartment.

Throughout the series, redheaded model Chili Storm was Millie's friendly nemesis (Millie: "Sorry I'm late! I just got back from the salon!" Chili: "Too bad they didn't have time to take you!" Millie [ringing phone drawn in foreground]: "Oh, there's the phone". Chili: "Wow! I'll bet you can also identify doorbells and auto horns!"). When Millie was not around, however, Chili would sometimes speak up for her colleague. Chili starred in her own 1969–1973 spin-off series.

In addition to regular appearances by Millie, Chili, Clicker and Daisy, there were occasional appearances by Howard Hanover, Toni Turner, Marvin, Agnes Ames (in charge of Wardrobe at the modeling agency) and a colleague who helped with agency sets and maintenance, Chili's wealthy boyfriend Reginald Goldmine, and Miss Scrubbley. Very late in the series, Mr. Hanover had a daffy platinum-blonde assistant, Dolly. Millie's parents are Nancy and Henry Collins. She has one younger brother, Spencer Collins.

== Power and abilities ==
Millie Collins has no superpowers. She is a model, actress, and businesswoman. Across the Millie the Model comic book series, Millie's beauty allows her to attract attention.

== Reception ==
=== Critical response ===
Mark Seifert of Bleeding Cool called Millie Collins "Marvel's most famous character outside its superhero universe", describing her as an "iconic character and one of the most important in Marvel's history". Jenna Anderson of ComicBook.com included Millie Collins in their "10 Marvel Studios Special Presentations We Still Want to See" list, while writing: "Beyond the narrative repercussions of telling the story of the MCU's Millie Collins, introducing her could further expand what the franchise is capable of. After years of complicated, male-gaze-friendly depictions of female heroines, Phase 4 of the MCU is gradually beginning to get more feminine. Not only is it putting more female characters in the spotlight, but it is giving them distinct approaches to their day-to-day life that go beyond half-hearted quips and inexplicably-perfect hairstyles — something that a modern take on characters like Millie and Chili could take that even further". Megan Nicole O'Brien of Comic Book Resources ranked Millie Collins 6th in their "Marvel: 10 Best Golden Age Heroines" list. Comics Buyer's Guide ranked Millie Collins 90th in their "100 Sexiest Women in Comics" list.

== Literary reception ==
In 1968, the Millie the Model comic book series won an Alley Award for "Best Romance Comic" at the New York Comic Art Convention.

Jonathan Bagamery of Comic Book Resources ranked the Millie the Model comic book series 1st in their "10 Best Romance Comics From Marvel Comics" list, saying: "Despite what her rivals might think, the true reigning queen of romance at Marvel is Millie the Model. Ruth Atkinson, co-creator of Patsy Walker, designed Millie for Timely Comics in 1945. For nearly 30 years, Millie's long-running search for romance crossed multiple genres. The popular title spawned several spin-offs, including Life with Millie and Modeling with Millie. Iconic Archie artist Dan DeCarlo had an influential ten-year run on Millie the Model, and the series also featured art from Al Hartley and Stan Goldberg. When Millie ended in December 1973, her finale signaled the end of Marvel's romance boom. Millie and other beloved characters from the Golden Age occasionally make memorable appearances in Marvel's superhero titles. But the House of Ideas has never repeated its early success with tales of true love".

Steven Schneider of Screen Rant called the comic book series "one of the most successful comedy series Marvel Comics ever published", writing: "The content was typically harmless fun: aside from the strictly humorous stories, a number of adventure stories were published throughout the years. They weren't necessarily revolutionary, but Marvel was clearly doing something right - it's no accident that the series stuck around for as long as it did".

== Spin-offs and annuals ==
=== Spin-offs ===
- A Date with Millie #1–7 (Oct. 1956 – Aug. 1957)
- A Date with Millie vol. 2, #1–7 (Oct. 1959 – Oct. 1960), continues as
  - Life With Millie #8–20 (Dec. 1960 – Dec. 1962), continues as
  - Modelling with Millie #21–54 (Feb. 1963 – June 1967)
- Mad about Millie #1–17 (April 1969 – Dec. 1970)
  - Mad about Millie Annual #1 (1971)
- Chili, Millie's Rival #1–26 (May 1969 – Dec. 1973)
  - Chili, Millie's Rival Special #1 (1971)
- Millie the Model Annual #1–10 (1962–1971), continues as
  - Queen-Size Millie the Model #11-12 (1974–1975)

=== Annuals ===
- Misty

In 1985 Trina Robbins revived Millie as an older supporting character in the Star Comics limited series Misty, where she featured as the title character's aunt and restarted her modelling career.

- 15 Love

In 2003, Marvel's then-president, Bill Jemas, told the press that there were plans to reimagine Millie as a 15-year-old tennis player for a comic book series called 15 Love, aimed at teenage girls. The possibility of a Millie film adaptation was also mentioned at that time. 15 Love was eventually published in 2011. Written by Andi Watson, it featured Millie Collins' niece, Millie 'Mill' Collins, the lowest-ranking student at the Wayde Tennis Academy, who is about to lose her scholarship and must convince her aunt and others not to give up on her. It ran for three issues, with each as a double-sized 56-page story.

== In other media ==
- A 1986 Off-Broadway musical, Dial "M" For Model by John Epperson, inspired by Millie but not a direct adaptation, was staged at LaMaMa E.T.C. It featured the female impersonator Lypsinka as Mannequin St. Claire, a character based on Chili.
