= Journey into Unknown Worlds =

1950s science fiction/horror/fantasy title from Atlas (pre-Marvel) Comics

Journey into Unknown Worlds is a science-fiction/horror/fantasy title from Atlas (pre-Marvel) Comics published during the 1950s.

The series continued from Timely Comics' teen-humor series Teen Comics and ran from Sept. 1950 - Aug. 1957.

It featured artists such as Joe Kubert, Steve Ditko, Al Williamson, Reed Crandall and Sid Check.
