= World of Fantasy =

Comic book series

- World of Fantasy #17 (April 1959). Cover art by Jack Kirby and Christopher Rule.

Publication information
- Publisher: Atlas Comics
- Format: Anthology
- Publication date: May 1956 to August 1959
- No. of issues: 19

World of Fantasy is a science fiction/fantasy comic book anthology series that was published by Marvel Comics' 1950s predecessor company, Atlas Comics. Lasting from 1956 to 1959, it included the work of several notable comics artists, including industry legends Jack Kirby, Steve Ditko, and Bill Everett.

The Marvel Comics antagonist Shrunken Bones (Dr. Jerry Morgan), of the supervillain team the Headmen, first appeared as a supporting character in a standalone science-fiction story in issue #11 (cover-dated April 1958).

== Publication history ==
World of Fantasy ran 19 issues, cover-dated May 1956 to August 1959, and was published bimonthly for all but two issues, #8 and #9 (Aug. & Dec. 1957). It was edited by Stan Lee and written by himself, the uncredited Larry Lieber, and Atlas staff writers, the latter uncredited except for Carl Wessler.

Bill Everett, creator of the Sub-Mariner during the period fans and historians call the Golden Age of Comic Books, was the title's most frequent cover artist, producing seven. The covers of #15 and #17-19 (Dec. 1958 and April-Aug. 1959) and a story each in #16 and #18 (Feb. and June 1959) marked some of the earliest work of Jack Kirby upon his return to Marvel Comics, after having co-created Captain America in 1940 and leaving the company a year later.

Other artists who contributed at least one story include Golden Age artists Carl Burgos, Kurt Schaffenberger, and Bob Powell; artists of the time including Bernard Krigstein, Joe Maneely, Joe Orlando, and Al Williamson; and future Marvel superhero pencilers of the 1960s Silver Age of Comics, including Ross Andru, Dick Ayers, Gene Colan, Don Heck, and Jim Mooney, and inkers Joe Sinnott and Jack Abel.

The Marvel Comics antagonist Shrunken Bones (Dr. Jerry Morgan), of the supervillain team the Headmen, first appeared as a supporting character in a standalone science-fiction story, "Prisoner of the Fantastic Fog", by an unknown writer with artist Angelo Torres, in issue #11 (cover-dated April 1958).
