= Red Warrior =

Red Warrior or Red Warriors may refer to:

== Sports ==
- UE Red Warriors, Lady Warriors, Junior Warriors and Lady Junior Warriors, the athletic teams of the University of the East in the Philippines
- Kelantan F.C., a Malaysian football club nicknamed "The Red Warriors"
- Kelantan Red Warrior F.C., a Malaysian football club

== Music ==
- Red Warrior (album), a 1990 album by Ronald Shannon Jackson
- Red Warriors (band), a Japanese rock band

== Other uses ==
- Red Warriors (gang), an anti-fascist redskin gang in the Paris region
- Red Warrior, West Virginia, an unincorporated community in the United States
