= Lorna the Jungle Girl =

- Lorna the Jungle Girl #6 (March 1954); Art by Russ Heath.

Publication information
- Publisher: Atlas Comics
- First appearance: Lorna the Jungle Queen #1 (July 1953)
- Created by: Don Rico; Werner Roth

In-story information
- Species: Human
- Abilities: Survival expert; Skilled hunter; Use of spears

Lorna the Jungle Girl, initially called Lorna the Jungle Queen, is a comic book jungle girl protagonist created by writer Don Rico and artist Werner Roth. She debuted in Lorna the Jungle Queen #1 (July 1953), published by Marvel Comics' 1950s predecessor, Atlas Comics.

== Publication history ==
Marvel Comics' jungle-girl protagonist Lorna debuted in Lorna the Jungle Queen #1 (July 1953), published by Marvel's 1950s predecessor, Atlas Comics and created by writer Don Rico and artist Werner Roth. After issue #5 (Feb. 1954), Lorna the Jungle Queen was retitled Lorna the Jungle Girl and ran 21 more issues, through #26 (March 1954 - Aug. 1957). The trademarked cover logo of both titles placed a comma after the character's name, though the copyright as indicated in the postal indicia is without a comma in both cases.

A wide variety of cover artists included Carl Burgos, Vince Colletta, Russ Heath, Joe Maneely, and Syd Shores. Bill Everett contributed five of the final six issues' covers. Rico and artist Jim Mooney initiated the backup feature "Greg Knight", starring a jungle-explorer character from the lead feature, with Shores, George Tuska, and John Romita Sr. among its later artists.

While the character has not appeared in new stories since her original 1950s run, selected adventures were reprinted in the 1970s Marvel comic Jungle Action #1-4, 6 (Oct. 1972 - April 1973, Sept. 1973) and in three hardcover volumes in the 2010s.

== Fictional character biography ==
After her mother had died in childbirth, young Lorna was brought to the African interior by her father, who died after being mauled by a lion known locally as Numa. Lorna then was raised by her father's friend Chief M'tuba and learned aboriginal skills, honing proficiency with knife and spear. She developed an almost mystical rapport with native animals, particularly with the chimpanzee Mikki. In adulthood she became a jungle protector, befriending natives, government authorities and explorer Greg Knight.

== Powers and abilities ==
Lorna has no superhuman abilities. She is a survivalist. The character is a skilled hunter and tracker. Her weapons include spears.

== Reception ==
=== Accolades ===
- In 2020, CBR.com ranked Lorna the Jungle Girl 10th in their "Marvel: 10 Best Golden Age Heroines" list.

== Collected editions ==
Title	Material collected	Publication date	ISBN
Marvel Masterworks Atlas Era Jungle Adventure, Vol. 1	Lorna the Jungle Queen #1-5, Lorna the Jungle Girl #6-9	January 2010	978-0785141914
Marvel Masterworks Atlas Era Jungle Adventure, Vol. 2	Lorna the Jungle Girl #10-12 (also non-Lorna Jungle Action #1-3, Jungle Tales #1-4)	June 2011	978-0785150121
Marvel Masterworks Atlas Era Jungle Adventure, Vol. 3	Lorna the Jungle Girl #13-16 (also non-Lorna Jungle Action #4-6, Jungle Tales #5-7)	March 2013	978-0785159278
