= Jungle Tales =

American comic book

- Jungle Tales #7 (Sept. 1955), cover art by Sol Brodsky.

Publication information
- Publisher: Atlas Comics
- Publication date: Sept. 1954 – Sept. 1955
- No. of issues: 7

Creative team
- Written by: Don Rico, Paul S. Newman
- Artist(s): Joe Maneely, Ogden Whitney, Art Peddy, Don Heck, George Tuska, Jay Scott Pike, Fred Kida, Sid Greene

Jungle Tales (later called Jann of the Jungle) is an American comic book title published by Atlas Comics, the 1950s predecessor to Marvel Comics. It was an anthology title of stories set in an African jungle.

== Publication history ==
Jungle Tales ran seven issues, cover-dated September 1954 to September 1955. It was renamed and continued as Jann of the Jungle from #8-17 (Nov. 1955 – June 1957), starring the titular jungle girl.

=== Marvel's first series star of color ===
One regular feature in Jungle Tales, "Waku, Prince of the Bantu", starred an African chieftain in Africa, with no regularly featured Caucasian characters. Marvel Comics' first Black feature star, he was created by writer Don Rico and artist Ogden Whitney, succeeded by artist John Romita Sr. Waku, who predated mainstream comics' first Black superhero, Marvel's Black Panther, by nearly a dozen years, headlined one of four regular features in each issue. It would take a decade for the first African-American series star, the Western character Lobo, to appear, and nearly two decades before the likes of the Black Panther, Luke Cage, and the Falcon would star in solo series.

The other features were "Jann of the Jungle", created by writer Rico and penciler Art Peddy; "Cliff Mason" a.k.a. "Cliff Mason, White Hunter", created by Paul S. Newman and penciler Sid Greene; and "The Unknown Jungle", featuring stories of African animals and nature in conflict.

== Collected editions ==
Title	Material collected	Publication date	ISBN
Marvel Masterworks Atlas Era Jungle Adventure, Vol. 2	Jungle Tales #1-4, Lorna the Jungle Girl #10-12, Jungle Action #1-3	June 2011	978-0785150121
Marvel Masterworks Atlas Era Jungle Adventure, Vol. 3	Jungle Tales #5-7, Lorna the Jungle Girl #13-16, Jungle Action #4-6)	March 2013	978-0785159278

== Additional Atlas jungle titles ==
Two brethren titles were published by Atlas. The six-issue Jungle Action (Oct. 1954 - Aug. 1955) featured "Lo-Zar, Lord of the Jungle"; "Jungle Boy"; "Leopard Girl"; and "Man-Oo the Mighty". The second title, Lorna, the Jungle Queen, renamed Lorna, the Jungle Girl with issue #6, ran 26 issues (July 1953 - Aug. 1957).
