= Girl Comics =

Two comic book series published by Marvel Comics and its forerunners

- Photographic cover of Girl Comics #1 (Oct. 1949).

Publication information
- Publisher: (1949); Timely Comics; Girl Confessions; Atlas Comics (2010); Marvel Comics
- Schedule: (1949); Bi-monthly (2010); Monthly
- Format: (1949); Ongoing series (2010); Limited series
- Genre: (1949); Romance comics (2010); Superhero comics
- Publication date: (1949); October 1949 – August 1954 (2010); May 2010 — September 2010
- No. of issues: (1949); 35 (2010); 3
- Editor(s): (1949); Stan Lee (2010); Sana Amanat; Rachel Pinnelas; Lauren Sankovitch; Jeanine Schaefer

Girl Comics is the name of two comic-book series published by Marvel Comics and its forerunners, Timely Comics and Atlas Comics. The first, debuting in 1949, ran 35 issues, changing its title to Girl Confessions with issue #13 (March 1952). The second was a three-issue limited series published in 2010.

== Publication history ==
=== First series (1949–1954) ===
The initial Marvel Comics publication entitled Girl Comics was an ongoing romance comics/girls'-adventure series edited by Stan Lee that ran 12 issues (October 1949 - January 1952), first by Marvel's 1940s predecessor, Timely Comics, and shortly afterward by the company's 1950s iteration, Atlas Comics. It was renamed Girl Confessions with issue #13 (March 1952) and ran a total 35 issues, through cover-date August 1954.

Artist contributors to this series included John Buscema and Al Hartley in issue #1, Bob Brown and Bill Everett in #3, Russ Heath in #5, Ann Brewster, Mike Esposito, and Dick Rockwell in #8, and Bernard Krigstein in #12. Contributors to multiple issues of Girl Confessions included Hartley, Jay Scott Pike, Morris Weiss, and Golden Age Batman artist Jerry Robinson.

=== Girl Comics ===
The first four issues of Girl Comics were written as typical romance comics, valuing plot over character development. Most narratives were recycled, not changing drastically between issues. Issues #5 through #12, however, adopted a new subtitle, Mystery, Adventure, Suspense! and featured plot-lines similar to those in Nancy Drew novels.

Issue	Title	Publication date
1	I Couldn't Escape From Love	October 1949
2	Blind Date	January 1950
3	Liz Taylor	April 1950
4	Borrowed Love	June 1950
5	The Man Who Followed, The Haunted Terror, The Death Plunge	October 1950
6-9	Mystery, Adventure, Suspense!	January/March/May/July 1951
10	The Deadly Double-Cross	September 1951
11	Love Stories	November 1951
12	BK, The Dark Hallway	January 1952

=== Girl Confessions ===
Issue	Title	Publication date
13	Bride with a Broken Heart	March 1952
14	Love or Infatuation?	May 1952
15	Untitled	June 1952
16	I'll Never Forget You!	July 1952
17	The Soldier's Wife!	August 1952
18	We Both Loved Jerry!	September 1952
19	Wallflower	October 1952
20	His Last Goodbye	November 1952
21	Unwanted	December 1952
22	Untitled	January 1953
23	The Man Who Kissed Me	February 1953
24	The Way You Kiss, Martha's Man, The Lonely Night, Love Note	March 1953
25	Back Into His Arms	April 1953
26	The Man I Must Marry	June 1953
27	Grounds for Marriage	August 1953
28	Love Me or Leave Me	September 1953
29	The Truth About Thelma Johnson	October 1953
30	Tall, Dark and Hands Off	January 1954
31	When the Real Thing Comes Along	February 1954
32	Schoolgirl Crush	March 1954
33	A Boy and a Girl	April 1954
34	Affair of the Heart	June 1954
35	Going Steady	August 1954

=== Second series (2010) ===
Girl Comics vol. 2, #1 (May 2010). Cover art by Amanda Conner.

The second Girl Comics was a three-issue limited series released as a part of Marvel's year-long Marvel Women project. Girl Comics was entirely written, colored, illustrated and lettered by female authors and artists. Sister titles published during this period under the Marvel Women project, included the limited series and one-shots Heralds, Black Widow, Namora, Lady Deadpool, and Her-oes. It ran three issues cover-dated May to September 2010. The collection was originally conceived as a celebration of both the 30th anniversary of She-Hulk and the National Women's History Project.

Jeanine Schaefer, one of the editors, said of the initiative's timing: "Because 2010 is the 30th anniversary of the first appearance of She-Hulk, we got together to brainstorm some ideas for a celebration of women at Marvel Comics, much like we did for the 70th anniversary...." She said the publisher felt the potentially controversial word "girl" in the title could be reclaimed: "It was one of the first titles we thought of (the actual first one, I think), because it pulled double-duty: Not only was it the name of an old Marvel romance title, it has a word in it that we could take back".

The 2010 series contains contributions from Devin K. Grayson, Louise Simonson, Amanda Conner, Jill Thompson, Trina Robbins, and Molly Crabapple, among others. The 52-page first issue included stories of the male characters Nightcrawler, the Punisher, and Spider-Man in addition to stories of the superheroines She-Hulk, Venus, and Jean Grey. In addition, a two-page text article spotlighted Marvel Comics' Silver Age secretary and later independent comics publisher Flo Steinberg

Illustrator and cartoonist Stephanie Buscema, who penciled and inked the eight-page story featuring Venus, is a granddaughter of the major comics artist John Buscema, whose work appeared in the first issue of the 1949 series.
