= Love Romances =

Comic book series

Love Romances is a comic book title originally published by Atlas Comics beginning in 1948 and later by Marvel Comics until 1963.

== Publication history ==
The title began publication as Ideal #1–5 (July 1948 - March 1949) until issue #6 (May 1949) when it was changed to Love Romances and continued until issue #106 (July 1963).

The title featured art from comics industry notables such as Larry Lieber, Don Heck, Vince Colletta, Christopher Rule, and Jay Scott Pike, and stories from writers such as Hank Chapman.

Coletta's earliest confirmed Atlas romance art was the six-page story "My Love for You" in Love Romances #37 (March 1954). Pike's final Atlas/Marvel works were the six-page story "When a Romance Ends" in Love Romances #87 (May 1960), and the five-page "Love or Infatuation?", written by Stan Lee, years later in issue #105 (May 1963).
