= Uncanny Tales (comics) =

- Uncanny Tales #1 (June 1952). Cover artist unconfirmed; possibly Sol Brodsky

Publication information
- Publisher: Atlas Comics; Marvel Comics; Alan Class Comics
- Publication date: (Atlas) June 1952 - Sept. 1957 (Marvel) Dec. 1973 - Oct. 1975 (Alan Class) 1963 - c. 1989
- No. of issues: (Atlas) 56 (Marvel) 12 (Alan Class) 187
- Editor(s): Stan Lee

Uncanny Tales is the name of two American science-fiction / horror comic-book series, published in the 1950s and the 1970s. The first volume was by Atlas Comics, the 1950s precursor of Marvel Comics, and the second volume by Marvel. It is also the title of a British comics digest.

== Atlas Comics ==
The first volume of the science-fiction / horror comic Uncanny Tales ran 56 issues, beginning publication with cover-date June 1952 and ceasing publication with its September 1957 issue. The first 28 issues predated the Comics Code Authority, the comics industry's self-censorship bureau. The series came under the Code's aegis with #29 (Feb. 1955). Published by Atlas Comics, the 1950s precursor of Marvel Comics, it was edited by the company's chief writer, Stan Lee, and included such art contributors as Bill Everett, Russ Heath, Fred Kida, Bernard Krigstein, Joe Maneely, Jerry Robinson, Syd Shores, Angelo Torres, and Doug Wildey.

== Marvel Comics ==
Uncanny Tales vol. 2, cover-titled Uncanny Tales from the Grave beginning with issue #3, was a 12-issue science-fiction / horror title published by Marvel Comics (cover-dated Dec. 1973 - Oct. 1975). It consisted entirely of reprints from the 1950s Uncanny Tales and several other Atlas and Marvel titles. The majority of issues had newly drawn covers by artists including Gil Kane (#1), Larry Lieber (#5-7) and Arvell Jones (#8).

== Alan Class Comics ==
The British reprint specialist Alan Class Comics published an unrelated Uncanny Tales in the UK that ran 187 issues from 1963 through c. 1989. (The company did not print cover dates.) The series, digest-sized rather than in standard comic-book size, with color covers but black-and-white interior pages, reprinted stories from the American Comics Group, Atlas Comics, Charlton Comics, Marvel Comics, and Tower Comics, as well as occasional stories from such defunct publishers as Novelty Press and Fox Comics. In addition to science fiction, fantasy and horror takes, it occasionally ran superhero stories, starring characters including Marvel's Daredevil, Spider-Man and the Avengers, and Tower's NoMan.
