= Atlas Comics (1950s) =

US comic book publisher (1951–1957)

- Type: Division
- Industry: Publishing
- Predecessor: Timely Comics
- Founded: November 1951; 74 years ago
- Founder: Martin Goodman
- Defunct: October 1957; 69 years ago
- Fate: Rebranded as Marvel Comics in 1961
- Successor: Marvel Comics
- Headquarters: Manhattan, New York City, U.S.
- Key people: Martin Goodman
- Products: Comic books, magazines
- Parent: Magazine Management Co., Inc.

Atlas Comics was the 1950s comic-book publishing label that evolved into Marvel Comics. Magazine and paperback novel publisher Martin Goodman, whose business strategy involved having a multitude of corporate entities, used Atlas as the umbrella name for his comic book division during this time. Atlas evolved out of Goodman's 1940s comic book division, Timely Comics, and was located on the 14th floor of the Empire State Building. This company is distinct from the 1970s comic-book company, also founded by Goodman, that is known as Atlas/Seaboard Comics.

== History ==
=== After the Golden Age ===
Young Men #25 (Feb. 1954): Cover art by Carl Burgos. Note the Atlas globe in the top left corner.

Atlas Comics was the successor of Timely Comics, the company that magazine and paperback novel publisher Martin Goodman founded in 1939, and which had reached the peak of its popularity during the war years with its star characters the Human Torch, the Sub-Mariner and Captain America. The early to mid-1950s found comic books falling out of fashion due to competition from television and other media.

Timely largely stopped producing superhero comics with the cancellation of Captain America Comics at issue #75 (cover-dated Feb. 1950), by which time the series had already been titled Captain America's Weird Tales for two issues, with the finale featuring only anthological suspense stories and no superheroes. The company's flagship title, Marvel Mystery Comics, starring the Human Torch, had already ended its run with #92 in June 1949, as had Sub-Mariner Comics with #32 the same month, and The Human Torch with #35 in March 1949. Timely made one more attempt at superheroes with the publication of Marvel Boy #1-2 (Dec. 1950 - Feb. 1951), which was retitled Astonishing with issue #3 (April 1951) and continued the Marvel Boy feature through #6 (Oct. 1951).

In the absence of superheroes, Goodman's comic book line expanded into a wide variety of genres, producing horror, Westerns, humor, talking animal, drama, crime, war, jungle, romance, espionage, medieval adventure, Bible stories and sports comics. As did other publishers, Atlas also offered comics about models and career women.

Goodman began using the logo of the Atlas News Company, the newsstand-distribution company he owned, on comics cover-dated November 1951, even though another company, Kable News, continued to distribute his comics through the August 1952 issues, with its "K" logo and the logo of the independent distributors' union appearing alongside the Atlas globe. The Atlas logo united a line put out by the same publisher, staff and freelancers through 59 shell companies, from Animirth Comics to Zenith Publications. Soon afterwards, the company rejoined the Association of Comics Magazine Publishers and begin using the "star" logo of ACMP on comics cover-dated between April 1952 and January 1955 on its titles, prior to the establishment of the Comics Code Authority.

The logo treatment on a 1954 comic-book page, with "Atlas" as the comics brand

Atlas attempted to revive superheroes in Young Men #24-28 (Dec. 1953 - June 1954) with the Human Torch (art by Syd Shores and Dick Ayers, variously), the Sub-Mariner (drawn and most stories written by Bill Everett) and Captain America (writer Stan Lee, artist John Romita Sr.). The short-lived revival also included restarts of Sub-Mariner Comics (issues #33-42, April 1954 - Oct. 1955) and Captain America (#76-78, May-Sept. 1954). All three superheroes also appeared in the final two issues of Men's Adventures (#27-28, May–July 1954).

=== Trend-following ===
The pre-Comics Code Astonishing #30 (Feb. 1954): Cover art by Joe Maneely.

Goodman's publishing strategy for Atlas involved what he saw as the proven route of following popular trends in TV and movies — Westerns and war dramas prevailing for a time, drive-in movie monsters another time — and even other comic books, particularly the EC horror line. As Marvel/Atlas editor-in-chief Stan Lee told comic-book historian Les Daniels, Goodman "would notice what was selling, and we'd put out a lot of books of that type." Commented Daniels, "The short-term results were lucrative; but while other publishers took the long view and kept their stables of heroes solid, Goodman let his slide."

While Atlas had some horror titles, such as Marvel Tales, as far back as 1949, the company increased its output dramatically in the wake of EC's success. Lee recalled, "[I]t was usually based on how the competition was doing. When we found that EC's horror books were doing well, for instance, we published a lot of horror books." Until the early 1960s, when Lee, Jack Kirby and Steve Ditko would help revolutionize comic books with the advent of the Fantastic Four and Spider-Man, Atlas was content to flood newsstands with profitable, cheaply produced product — often, despite itself, beautifully rendered by talented if low-paid artists.

The Atlas "bullpen" had at least five staff writers (officially called editors) besides Lee: Hank Chapman, Paul S. Newman, Don Rico, Carl Wessler, and, in the teen humor division, future Mad magazine cartoonist Al Jaffee. Daniel Keyes, future author of Flowers for Algernon, was an editor beginning 1952. Other writers, generally freelance, included Robert Bernstein.

The artists — some freelance, some on staff — included such veterans as Human Torch creator Carl Burgos and Sub-Mariner creator Bill Everett. The next generation included the prolific and much-admired Joe Maneely, who before his death just prior to Marvel's 1960s breakthrough was the company's leading artist, providing many covers and doing work in all genres, most notably on Westerns and on the medieval adventure Black Knight. Others included Russ Heath, Gene Colan, and the fledgling, highly individualistic Steve Ditko.

Some of Atlas' prominent Western titles, many reprinted in the 1970s, were Ringo Kid, with art by Maneely, Fred Kida and John Severin; artist Doug Wildey's The Outlaw Kid; artist Jack Keller's Kid Colt, Outlaw; the anthology Gunsmoke Western, starring Kid Colt; and Black Rider, drawn by Maneely, Syd Shores and others.

=== Humor and miscellanea ===
Sergeant Barney Barker #1 (August. 1956), cover art by John Severin.

Atlas also published various children's and teen humor titles, including Dan DeCarlo's Homer, the Happy Ghost (a la Casper the Friendly Ghost), Homer Hooper (a la Archie Andrews) and the Joe Maneely-drawn Melvin the Monster (a la Dennis the Menace). Sergeant Barney Barker, drawn by John Severin, was Atlas' answer to Sgt. Bilko.

One of the most long-running titles was Millie the Model, which began as a Timely Comics humor series in 1945 and ran into the 1970s, lasting for 207 issues and launching spinoffs along the way. Created by writer-artist Ruth Atkinson, it later became the training ground for cartoonist DeCarlo — the future creator of Josie and the Pussycats, Sabrina, the Teenage Witch and other Archie Comics characters, and the artist who established Archie Comics’ modern look. DeCarlo wrote and drew Millie for 10 years.

The high-school series Patsy Walker, co-created by Atkinson and writer Otto Binder in 1944, featured art by Al Hartley, Al Jaffee, Morris Weiss and others, and ran until 1967 It spun off three titles. Patsy herself would be integrated into Marvel Universe continuity years later as the supernatural superheroine Hellcat.

Atlas' talking animal books featured cartoonist Ed Winiarski's trouble-prone Buck Duck, Maneely's mentally suspect Dippy Duck, and Howie Post's The Monkey and the Bear. Buck and the other animal characters briefly returned in the early 1970s when Marvel published the five-issue reprint title Li'l Pals ("Fun-Filled Animal Antics!").

Miscellaneous titles included the espionage series Yellow Claw, with Maneely, Severin, and Jack Kirby art; the Native American hero Red Warrior, with art by Tom Gill; the space opera Space Squadron, written and drawn by future Marvel production executive Sol Brodsky; and Sports Action, initially featuring true-life stories about the likes of George Gipp and Jackie Robinson, and later fictional features of, as one cover headline put it, "Rugged Tales of Danger and Red-Hot Action!".

Staff artist Stan Goldberg recalled in 2005, "I was in the Bullpen with a lot of well-known artists who worked up there at that time. ... The guys ... who actually worked nine-to-five and put in a regular day, and not the freelance guys who'd come in a drop off their work ... were almost a hall of fame group of people. There was John Severin. Bill Everett. Carl Burgos. There was the all-time great Joe Maneely.... We all worked together, all the colorists and correction guys, the letterers and artists. ... We had a great time".

=== Layoffs ===
From 1952 to late 1956, Goodman distributed Atlas' comics to newsstands through his self-owned distributor, the Atlas News Company. He shut down Atlas News Company in 1956 and began newsstand distribution through American News Company, the nation's largest distributor and a virtual monopoly, which shortly afterward lost a Justice Department lawsuit and discontinued its business. As comic-book historian Gerard Jones explains, the company in 1956

...had been found guilty of restraint of trade and ordered to divest itself of the newsstands it owned. Its biggest client, George Delacorte, announced he would seek a new distributor for his Dell Comics and paperbacks. The owners of American News estimated the effect that would have on their income. Then they looked at the value of the New Jersey real estate where their headquarters sat. They liquidated the company and sold the land. The company ... vanished without a trace in the suburban growth of the 1950s.

The Atlas globe remained on the covers, however, until American News went out of business in June 1957. With no other options, Goodman turned to the distributor Independent News, owned by rival National Periodical Publications, the future DC Comics, which agreed to distribute him on constrained terms that allowed only eight titles per month. The last comic to bear the Atlas globe on the cover was the comic Dippy Duck #1, and the first to bear the new "Ind." distributors' mark was Patsy Walker #73, both cover-dated October 1957. The company was accordingly renamed to Goodman Comics after signing a distribution pact with Independent News, according to a 1960 trade article.

Stan Lee, in a 1988 interview, recalled that Goodman:

...had gone with the American News Company. I remember saying to him, 'Gee, why did you do that? I thought that we had a good distribution company.' His answer was like, 'Oh, Stan, you wouldn't understand. It has to do with finance.' I didn't really give a damn, and I went back to doing the comics. [Later,] we were left without a distributor and we couldn't go back to distributing our own books because the fact that Martin quit doing it and went with American News had gotten the wholesalers very angry ... and it would have been impossible for Martin to just say, 'Okay, we'll go back to where we were and distribute our books.' [We had been] turning out 40, 50, 60 books a month, maybe more, and [now] the only company we could get to distribute our books was our closest rival, National [DC] Comics. Suddenly we went ... to either eight or 12 books a month, which was all Independent News Distributors would accept from us.

During this retrenchment, according to a fabled industry story, Goodman discovered a closet-full of unused, but paid-for, art, leading him to have virtually the entire staff fired while he used up the inventory. In the interview noted above, Lee, one of the few able to give a firsthand account, told a seemingly self-contradictory version of the downsizing:

It would never have happened just because he opened a closet door. But I think that I may have been in a little trouble when that happened. We had bought a lot of strips that I didn't think were really all that good, but I paid the artists and writers for them anyway, and I kinda hid them in the closet! And Martin found them and I think he wasn't too happy. If I wasn't satisfied with the work, I wasn't supposed to have paid, but I was never sure it was really the artist's or the writer's fault. But when the job was finished I didn't think that it was anything that I wanted to use. I felt that we could use it in inventory — put it out in other books. Martin, probably rightly so, was a little annoyed because it was his money I was spending.

In a 2003 interview, Joe Sinnott, one of the company's top artists for more than 50 years, recalled Lee citing the inventory issue as a primary cause. "Stan called me and said, 'Joe, Martin Goodman told me to suspend operations because I have all this artwork in house and have to use it up before I can hire you again.' It turned out to be six months, in my case. He may have called back some of the other artists later, but that's what happened with me."

=== Pre-superhero Marvel ===
Strange Worlds #1 (Dec. 1958), the first Marvel/Atlas work by artist Jack Kirby upon his permanent return to the company. Cover art by penciler Kirby and inker Christopher Rule.

Goodman's men's magazines and paperback books were still successful — the comics, except in the early Golden Age, were a relatively small part of the business — and Goodman considered shutting the division down. The details of his decision not to do so are murky. Artist Jack Kirby — who had amicably split with creative partner Joe Simon a few years earlier, and separately lost a lawsuit to a DC Comics editor — was having difficulty finding work. He recalled that in late 1958,

I came in [to the Marvel offices] and they were moving out the furniture, they were taking desks out — and I needed the work! ... Stan Lee is sitting on a chair crying. He didn't know what to do, he's sitting on a chair crying — he was still just out of his adolescence [Note: Lee, born Dec. 28, 1922, would actually have been about 36.] I told him to stop crying. I says, 'Go in to Martin and tell him to stop moving the furniture out, and I'll see that the books make money'.

The interviewer, The Comics Journal publisher Gary Groth, later wrote of this interview in general, "Some of Kirby's more extreme statements ... should be taken with a grain of salt...." Lee, specifically asked about the office-closing anecdote, said,

I never remember being there when people were moving out the furniture. If they ever moved the furniture, they did it during the weekend when everybody was home. Jack tended toward hyperbole, just like the time he was quoted as saying that he came in and I was crying and I said, 'Please save the company!' I'm not a crier and I would never have said that. I was very happy that Jack was there and I loved working with him, but I never cried to him. (laughs)

Kirby had previously returned, in late 1956, to freelance on five issues cover-dated December 1956 and February 1957, but did not stay. Now, beginning with the cover and the seven-page story "I Discovered the Secret of the Flying Saucers" for Strange Worlds #1 (Dec. 1958), Kirby returned for a 12-year run that would soon help revolutionize comics. While career necessity led Kirby back to publisher Goodman, whom he had left acrimoniously in 1941, Kirby nonetheless helped elevate simple science fiction and giant-monster stories with what comics historian Charles Hatfield called "a vital jab in the ribs by [his] outlandish artistry. Soon his dynamic work began gracing countless covers and lead stories in the extant Strange Tales and the newly launched Amazing Adventures, Strange Worlds, Tales of Suspense, Tales to Astonish and World of Fantasy. "Offsetting the formulaic nature of the stories was a dash of invigorating absurdity," wrote Hatfield. "The tales had Kirby's energy and, courtesy of Lee, confessional, first-person titles typical of sensation-mongering tabloids and comics, such as, 'I Created Sporr, the Thing That Could Not Die!'"

A Kirby science fiction/monster story, usually inked by Christopher Rule initially, then by Dick Ayers following Rule's retirement, would generally open each book. This was followed by one or two twist-ending thrillers or sci-fi tales drawn by Don Heck, Paul Reinman, or Joe Sinnott, all capped by an often-surreal, sometimes self-reflexive short by Lee and artist Steve Ditko. Lee in 2009 described these "short, five-page filler strips that Steve and I did together", originally "placed in any of our comics that had a few extra pages to fill", as "odd fantasy tales that I'd dream up with O. Henry-type endings." Giving an early example of what would later be known as the "Marvel Method" of writer-artist collaboration, Lee said, "All I had to do was give Steve a one-line description of the plot and he'd be off and running. He'd take those skeleton outlines I had given him and turn them into classic little works of art that ended up being far cooler than I had any right to expect."

Don Heck, who worked as an Atlas staff artist from 1954 until the company's retrenchment in 1957 before returning the following year, recalled that the 1958 page rate "was around $20 per page to pencil and ink, I think [rival comic-book publisher] DC's average was $38. It didn't pick up until 1964-65, and even then it didn't go up all that much — a couple of bucks a page."

Although for several months in 1949 and 1950 Timely's titles bore a circular logo labeled "Marvel Comic", the first modern comic books so labeled were the science fiction anthology Journey into Mystery #69 and the teen humor title Patsy Walker #95 (both June 1961), which each showed an "MC" box on its cover. However, collectors routinely refer to the company's comics from the April 1959 cover-dates onward (when they began featuring Jack Kirby artwork on his return to Goodman's company), as pre-superhero Marvel. Goodman would reuse the name Atlas for the next comics company he founded, in the 1970s.

== Atlas titles by type ==
Some titles may be arguably Timely at the earlier end, or Marvel at the later end. Many series took over the numbering from previous series, which are listed. In titles numbered from or into the various All Winners Comics, additional clarifying information is supplied.

=== Crime ===
- All-True Crime #37–52 (Feb. 1948 – Sept. 1952) early issues Timely; continued from Timely Comics' All True Crime Cases
- Amazing Detective Cases #3–14 (Nov. 1950 – Sept. 1952) continued from n.a.
- Caught #1–5 (Aug. 1956 – April 1957)
- Crime Can't Win #41–43, 4–12 (Sept. 1950 – Sept. 1952) continued from romance title Cindy Smith
- Crime Cases Comics #24–27, 5–12 (Aug. 1950 – July 1952) continued from successive Timely Comics series Li'l Willie Comics and Willie Comics
- Crime Exposed vol. 2, #1–14 (Dec. 1950 – June 1952)
- Crime Fighters #11–13 (Sept. 1954 – Jan. 1955) continued from Timely Comics' Crimefighters
- Crime Must Lose #4–12 (Oct. 1950 – April 1952) continued from either Sports Action or Blaze the Wonder Collie
- Justice #7–9 (first three issues), then 4–52 (Fall 1947 – March 1955) early issues Timely Comics; continued from Timely title Wacky Duck; continued as Tales of Justice #53–67 (May 1955 – Sept. 1957)
- Kent Blake of the Secret Service #1–14 (May 1951 – July 1953)
- Police Action #1–7 (Jan.–Nov. 1954)
- Police Badge #479 #5 (Sept. 1955) continued from Spy Thrillers (espionage title)
- Private Eye #1–8 (Jan. 1951 – March 1952)

=== Drama ===
- Man Comics #1–10 (Dec. 1949 – Oct. 1951) continued as war title Man Comics
- Rugged Action #1–4 (Dec. 1954 – June 1955) continued as Horror/fantasy/science fiction title Strange Stories of Suspense
- True Adventures #3 (May 1950) continued from Western title True Western; continued as Men's Adventures #4–8 (Aug. 1950 – June 1951) continued as war title Men's Adventures

=== Espionage ===
- Spy Cases #26–28 4–19 (Sept. 1950 – Oct. 1953) continued from Timely Comics' humor title The Kellys
- Spy Fighters #1–15 (March 1951 – July 1953)
- Spy Thrillers #1–4 (Nov. 1954 – May 1955) continued as Police Badge #479 (crime title)
- Yellow Claw #1–4 (Oct. 1956 – April 1957)

=== Talking animal and other children's comics ===
- Adventures of Homer Ghost #1–2 (Jan.–Aug. 1957)
- Buck Duck #1–4 (June–Dec. 1953)
- Cartoon Kids #1 (no date; 1957)
- Dippy Duck #1 (Oct. 1957)
- Homer, the Happy Ghost #1–22 (March 1955 – Nov. 1958)
- Little Lizzie vol. 2, #1–3 (Sept. 1953 – Jan. 1954) (previous volume: Timely Comics' Little Lizzie #1–5)
- Marvin Mouse #1 (Sept. 1957)
- Melvin the Monster #1–6 (July 1956 – July 1957) continued as Dexter the Demon #7 (Sept. 1957)

Note: The above two series not supernatural, but Dennis the Menace–like

- The Monkey and the Bear #1–3 (Sept. 1953 – Jan. 1954)
- Wonder Duck #1–3 (Sept. 1949 – March 1950) continued as It's a Duck's Life #4–11 (Nov. 1950 – Feb. 1952)

=== Horror/fantasy/sci-fi ===
- Adventure into Mystery #1–8 (May 1956 – July 1957)
- Adventures into Terror #43–44 (first two issues), then #3–31 (Nov. 1950 – May 1954) original numbering continued from Timely Comics' humor title Joker
- Adventures into Weird Worlds #1–30 (Jan. 1952 – June 1954)
- Amazing Adventures #1–6 (June–Nov. 1961) continued as Amazing Adult Fantasy #7–14 (Dec. 1961 – July 1962) and Marvel Comics' Amazing Fantasy
- Amazing Mysteries #32–35 (May 1949 – Jan. 1950) continued from Sub-Mariner;
- Astonishing #3–63 (April 1951 – Aug. 1957) continued from superhero title Marvel Boy
- Journey into Mystery #1–82 (June 1952 – July 1962) continued as a Marvel Comics superhero title
- Journey into Unknown Worlds #36–59 (Sept. 1950 – Aug. 1957) continued from Timely Comics' teen humor series Teen Comics
- Marvel Tales #93–159 (Aug. 1949 – Aug. 1957) continued from Timely Comics' superhero title Marvel Mystery Comics
- Menace #1–11 (March 1953 – May 1954)
- Men's Adventures #21–26 (May 1953 – March 1954) continued from War title Men's Adventures) continued as superhero title Men's Adventures
- Mystery Tales #1–54 (March 1952 – Aug. 1957)
- Mystic #1–61 (March 1951 – Aug. 1957)
- Space Squadron #1–5 (June 1951 – Feb. 1952) continued as Space Worlds #6 (April 1952)
- Spaceman (cover logo: Speed Carter, Spaceman) #1–6 (Sept. 1953 – June 1954)
- Spellbound (cover logo: Stories to Hold You Spellbound) #1–34 (March 1952 – June 1957)
- Strange Stories of Suspense #5–16 (Oct. 1955 – Aug. 1957) continued from drama title Rugged Action)
- Strange Tales #1–100 (June 1951 – Sept. 1962); post-1961 issues Marvel Comics; series continued as a Marvel Comics superhero title
- Strange Tales of the Unusual #1–11 (Dec. 1955 – Aug. 1957)
- Strange Worlds #1–5 (Dec. 1958 – Aug. 1959)
- Suspense #1–29 (Dec. 1949 – April 1953)
- Tales of Suspense #1–38 (Jan. 1959 – Feb. 1963); post-1961 issues Marvel Comics; series continued as a Marvel Comics superhero title
- Tales to Astonish #1–34 (Jan. 1959 – Aug. 1962); post-1961 issues Marvel Comics; series continued as a Marvel Comics superhero title
- Uncanny Tales #1–56 (June 1952 – Sept. 1957)
- Venus #1–19 (Aug. 1948 – April 1952) early issues Timely Comics
- World of Fantasy #1–19 (May 1956 – Aug. 1959)
- World of Mystery #1–7 (June 1956 – July 1957)
- World of Suspense #1–8 (April 1956 – July 1957)

=== Humor (satire) ===
- Crazy #1–7 (Dec. 1953 – July 1954)
- Riot #1–6 (April 1954 – June 1956)
- Snafu #1–3 (Nov. 1955 – March 1956)
- Wild #1–5 (Feb. 1954 – Aug. 1954)

=== Humor (sitcom) ===
- A Date with Millie #1–7 (Oct. 1956 – Aug. 1957)
- A Date with Millie vol. 2, #1–7 (Oct. 1959 – Oct. 1960) continued as Life With Millie #8–20 (Dec. 1960 – Marvel Comics)
- A Date with Patsy #1 (Sept. 1957)
- The Adventures of Pinky Lee #1–5 (July – Dec. 1955)
- Della Vision #1–3 (April – Aug. 1955) continued as romance title Patty Powers
- Girls' Life (subtitled "Patsy Walker's Own Magazine for Girls") #1–6 (Jan.–Nov. 1954)
- Hedy of Hollywood Comics #36–50 (Feb, 1950 – Sept. 1952) continued from Timely Comics' Young Allies #1–20, All Winners Comics #21, and Hedy De Vine Comics #22–35
- Hedy Wolfe (subtitled: "Patsy Walker's Rival"; not to be confused with Hedy of Hollywood) #1 (Aug. 1957)
- Homer Hooper #1–4 (July – Dec. 1953)
- Kathy #1–27 (Oct. 1959 – Marvel Comics)
- Millie the Model #1–207 (Winter 1945 – Marvel Comics)
- My Friend Irma #3–48 (June 1950 – Feb. 1955) continued from Timely Comics' My Diary
- My Girl Pearl #1–11 (April 1955 – April 1961)
- Nellie the Nurse #1–36 (1945 – Oct. 1952) early issues Timely Comics)
- Nellie the Nurse vol. 2, #1 (1957)
- Patsy Walker #1–99 (Winter 1945 – Feb. 1962); post-1961 issues Marvel Comics
- Patsy and Hedy #1–73 (Feb. 1952 – Dec. 1960)
- Patsy and Her Pals #1–29 (May 1953 – Aug. 1957)
- Sergeant Barney Barker #1–2 (Aug. – Dec. 1957) continued as War title G.I. Tales
- Sherry the Showgirl #1–3 (July. – Dec. 1956) continued as Showgirls #4 (Feb. 1957) and Sherry the Showgirl #5–7 (April – Aug. 1957)
- Showgirls vol. 2, #1–2 (July – Aug. 1957)
- Wendy Parker #1–8 (July 1953 – July 1954)
- Willie the Wiseguy #1 (Sept. 1957)

=== Jungle ===
- Jungle Action #1–6 (Oct. 1954 – Aug. 1955; vol. 2, published in the 1970s)
- Jungle Tales #1–7 (Sept. 1954 – Sept. 1955) continued as Jann of the Jungle #8–17 (Nov. 1955 – June 1957)
- Lorna, the Jungle Queen #1–5 (July 1953 – Feb. 1954) continued as Lorna, the Jungle Girl #6–26 (March 1954 – Aug. 1957)

=== Medieval adventure ===
- Black Knight #1–5 (May 1955 – April 1956)

=== Romance ===
- Cindy Smith #39–40 (May–July 1950) continued from Timely Comics' Cindy Comics; continued as Crime title Crime Can't Win
- Girl Confessions #13–34 (March 1952 – Aug. 1954) continued from Girl Comics.
- Love Adventures #1–12 (Oct. 1949–Aug. 1952; early issues Timely Comics) continued as Actual Confessions #13–14 (Oct.–Dec. 1952)
- Love Romances #6–106 (May 1949 – July 1963) early issues Timely Comics; continued from Timely's Ideal
- Love Tales #36–75 (May 1949 – Sept. 1957) early issues Timely Comics; continued from Timely's superhero comic The Human Torch #1–35; see note at ‘’’Superheroes’’’ below.
- Lovers #23–86 (May 1949 – Aug. 1957) early issues Timely; continued from Timely's superhero comic Blonde Phantom
- Meet Miss Bliss #1–4 (May 1955 – Nov. 1955) continued as Stories of Romance #5–13 (March 1956 – Aug. 1957)
- Molly Manton's Romances #1 (Sept. 1949)
  - Romances of Molly Manton #2 (Dec. 1949)
- My Love Story #1a9 (April 1956 – Aug. 1957)
- My Own Romance #4–76 (March 1949 – July 1960) continued from Timely Comics' My Romance; continued as Teen-age Romance #77–86 (Sept. 1960 – March 1962; post-#82 Marvel Comics)
- Patty Powers #4–7 (Oct. 1955 – Oct. 1956) continued from Humor title Della Vision
- Secret Story Romances #1–21 (Nov. 1953 – March 1956) continued as True Tales of Love #22–31 (April 1956 – Sept. 1957)
- The Romances of Nurse Helen Grant #1 (Aug. 1957)
- True Secrets #3–40 (March 1950 – Sept. 1956) continued from Timely Comics' Our Love

=== Sports ===
- Sports Action #2–14 (Feb. 1950 – Sept. 1952) continued from Timely Comics' Sport Stars

=== Superheroes ===
- Captain America #76–78 (May–Sept. 1954) continued from Timely Comics' Captain America Comics and Captain America's Weird Tales
- The Human Torch #36–38 (April–Aug. 1954) continued from its Timely Comics run, despite its numbering having been taken over by the Romance title Love Tales
- Marvel Boy #1–2 (Dec. 1950 – Feb. 1951) continued as Horror title Astonishing, in which Marvel Boy stars from #3–6.
- Men's Adventures #27–28 (May–July 1954) continued from Horror title Men's Adventures
- Sub-Mariner #33–42 (April 1954 – Oct. 1955) continued from Timely Comics' Sub-Mariner Comics
- Young Men #24–28 (Dec. 1953 – June 1954) continued from Misc. title Young Men

=== War ===
- 3-D Action #1 (Jan. 1954)
- Battle #1–70 (March 1951 – June 1960)
- Battle Action #1–30 (Feb. 1952 – Aug. 1957)
- Battle Ground (first four issues Battle–Ground) #1–20 (Sept. 1954 – Sept.1957)
- Battlefield #1–11 (April 1952 – May 1953)
- Battlefront #1–48 (June 1952 – Aug. 1957)
- Combat #1–11 (June 1952 – April 1953)
- Combat Kelly #1–44 (Nov. 1951 – Aug. 1957)
- Commando Adventures #1–2 (June–Aug. 1957)
- Devil-Dog Dugan #1–3 (July–Nov. 1956) continued as Tales of the Marines #4 (Feb. 1957) and Marines at War #5–7 (April–Aug. 1957)
- G.I. Tales #4–6 (Feb.–July 1957) continued from humor title Sergeant Barney Barker)
- Man Comics #11–28 (Dec. 1951 – Sept. 1953) continued from Drama title Man Comics)
- Marines in Action #1–14 (June 1955 – Sept. 1957)
- Marines in Battle #1–25 (Aug. 1954 – Sept. 1958)
- Men in Action #1–9 (April–Dec. 1952) continued as Battle Brady #10–14 (Jan.–June 1953)
- Men's Adventures #9–20 (Aug. 1951 – April 1953) continued from Drama title Men's Adventures; continued as horror title Men's Adventures
- Navy Action #1–11 (Aug. 1954 – April 1956); Sailor Sweeney #12–14 (June–Nov. 1956); and Navy Action #15–18 (Jan.–Aug. 1957)
- Navy Combat #1–20 (June 1955 – Oct. 1958)
- Navy Tales #1–4 (Jan.–July 1957)
- War Action #1–14 (April 1952 – June 1953)
- War Adventures #1–13 (Jan. 1952 – Feb. 1953)
- War Combat #1–5 (March–Nov. 1952) continued as Combat Casey #6–34 (Jan. 1953 – July 1957)
- War Comics #1–49 (Dec. 1950 – Sept. 1957)

=== Western ===
- 3-D Tales of the West #1 (Jan. 1954)
- All Western Winners #2–4 (Winter 1948 – April 1949)
  - continued from Timely Comics' All Winners Comics vol. 2, #1;
  - continued as Western Winners #5–7 (June 1949 – Dec. 1949)
  - continued as Black Rider #8–27 (March 1950 – March 1955)
  - continued as Western Tales of Black Rider #28–31 (May 1955 – Nov. 1955)
  - continued as Gunsmoke Western #32–77 (Dec. 1955 – July 1963)
- Annie Oakley #1–11 (Spring–Nov. 1948; June 1955 – June 1956)
- Arizona Kid #1–6 (March 1951 – Jan. 1952)
- Arrowhead #1–4 (April 1954 – Nov. 1954)
- Billy Buckskin Western #1–3 (Nov. 1955 – March 1956) continued as 2-Gun Western #4 (May 1956) and Two-Gun Western #5–12 (July 1956 – Sept. 1957) See also Two Gun Western
- The Black Rider Rides Again! #1 (Sept. 1957) See also Black Rider, above
- Frontier Western #1–10 (Feb. 1956 – August 1957)
- The Gunhawk #12–18 (Nov. 1950 – Dec. 1951) continued from successive Timely Comics titles Blaze Carson, Rex Hart, and Whip Wilson
- Kid Colt, Hero of the West #1–2 (Aug.–Oct. 1948) continued as Kid Colt, Outlaw #3–229 (Dec. 1948 – Marvel Comics)
- The Kid from Dodge City #1–2 (July–Sept. 1957)
- The Kid from Texas #1–2 (July–Aug. 1957)
- Matt Slade, Gunfighter #1–4 (May–Nov. 1956) continued as Kid Slade, Gunfighter #5–8 (Jan.–July 1957)
- Outlaw Fighters #1–5 (Aug. 1954 – April 1955)
- The Outlaw Kid #1–19 (Sept. 1954 – Sept. 1957)
- Rawhide Kid #1–16, 17–25 (March 1955 – Sept. 1957; Aug. 1960 – Dec. 1961); post-1961 issues Marvel Comics
- Red Warrior #1–6 (Jan.–Dec. 1951)
- Reno Browne, Hollywood's Greatest Cowgirl #50–52 (April–Sept. 1950; continued from Timely Comics' Margie; continued as The Apache Kid #53 (Dec. 1950); Apache Kid #2–19 (Feb. 1951 – Jan. 1952; Dec. 1954 – April 1956) and Western Gunfighters #20–27 (June 1956 – Aug. 1957)
- Ringo Kid Western #1–4 (Aug. 1954 – Feb. 1955) continued as Ringo Kid #5–21 (April 1955 – Sept. 1957)
- Six-Gun Western #1–4 (Jan.–July 1957)
- Texas Kid #1–10 (Jan. 1951 – July 1952)
- True Western #1–2 (Dec. 1949 – March 1950) continued as drama title True Adventures
- Two-Gun Kid #1–59 (March 1948 – April 1961); early issues Timely Comics
- Two Gun Western #5–14 (Nov. 1950 – June 1952) continued from Timely Comics' Crime title Casey – Crime Photographer
- Western Kid #1–17 (Dec. 1954 – Aug. 1957)
- Western Outlaws #1–21 (Feb. 1954 – Aug. 1957)
- Western Outlaws & Sheriffs #60–73 (Dec. 1949 – June 1952) continued from Timely Comics' Best Western
- Western Thrillers #1–4 (Nov. 1954 – Feb. 1955) continued as Cowboy Action #5–11 (March 1955 – March 1956) and Quick-Trigger Western #12–19 (May 1956 – Sept. 1957)
- Western Trails #1–2 (May–July 1957)
- Wild Western #3–57 (September 1948 – September 1957) continued from Timely Comics' Wild West; early issues Timely Comics
- Wyatt Earp #1–29 (Nov. 1955 – June 1960) continued as 1970s Marvel Comics reprint title

=== Miscellaneous ===
- Bible Tales for Young Folk #1–5 (Aug. 1953 – March 1954)
- Girl Comics #1–12 (Oct. 1949 – Jan. 1952) continued as Romance title Girl Confessions.
- Miss America Magazine (renamed Miss America starting with issue #46, July 1952) #1–93 (Jan. 1944 – Nov. 1958; 126 issues with inconsistent volume numbering); note: variously, and at times overlapping, a superhero, romance and humor title.
- World's Greatest Songs #1 (Sept. 1954)
- Young Men #4–23 (June 1950 – Oct. 1953) continued from Timely Comics' Cowboy Romances; note: cover title is Young Men on the Battlefield! #12–20) continued as Superhero title Young Men.

Note: The romance title Linda Carter, Student Nurse #1–9 (Sept. 1961 – Jan. 1963), sometimes grouped together with Atlas Comics, chronologically falls within Marvel, and all covers have the "MC" box.
