= Violet Barclay =

American illustrator

- Barclay as depicted by uncredited artist in Secrets Behind the Comics by Stan Lee (1947)
- Born: Violet Barclay; November 5, 1922 New York City, New York
- Died: February 26, 2010 (aged 87) New York City, New York
- Area: Artist
- Pseudonyms: Valerie Barclay; Valerie Smith

Violet A. Barclay (November 5, 1922 – February 26, 2010), who also worked under the name Valerie Barclay and the married name Valerie Smith, was an American illustrator best known as one of the pioneering female comic-book artists, having started in the field during the 1930s and 1940s period historians and fans call the Golden Age of Comic Books.

Born Violet Barclay, she adopted "Valerie" in adulthood, after actress Valerie Hobson, though without filing for legal change of name.

== Biography ==
=== Early life and career ===
Barclay was born and raised in Manhattan, New York City, New York, with a sister, two younger brothers, and a single mother who had left her husband when Barclay was a minor. Barclay attended the School of Industrial Art high school, where her classmates included future comic-book professional Allen Bellman, and the School of Visual Arts. She obtained her first job in comics after Mike Sekowsky — a fellow Industrial Art alumnus and a penciler for Marvel Comics predecessor Timely Comics — met her while she was working at the restaurant Cafe Rouge. She recalled in a 2004 interview, "I was 17, and ... was making $18 a week as a hostess. Mike said, 'I'll get you a job making $35 a week as a [staff] inker, and you can [additionally] freelance over the weekend. I'll let you ink my stuff'. He went to editor Stan Lee and got me the job. I didn't know anything about inking. [Staff artist] Dave Gantz taught me — just by watching him".

Initially using the name Violet Barclay, she went on staff at Timely in January 1942, when the company moved from its first location, the McGraw-Hill Building, to its home of the next several years, the Empire State Building. Due to her work going unsigned and uncredited, in the general manner of the times, comprehensive credits are difficult if not impossible to ascertain. The Who's Who of American Comic Books 1928-1999 credits Barclay as having inked stories for the Timely talking animal features "Super Rabbit" (1942–48) and "Ziggy Pig and Silly Seal" (1943–47), as well as stories in the teen-humor titles Jeanie, Rusty, Willie (all 1947-48), and Georgie (1949), and the career-girl humor series Nellie the Nurse (1949).

During this time, Barclay's complicated relationship with benefactor Sekowsky — who bestowed expensive gifts on her even after his marriage to Joanne Latta — caused friction in the Timely bullpen, which she left in 1949. As she later described the office environment,

Mike was a very good human being. Everybody at Timely liked Mike. Nobody like me because they thought I was doing a number on him. Which was true. World War II was on and there were no men around, so I just killed time with him. Everybody, Dave Gantz especially, picked up on that. ... [Mike] once tried to get me fired over my fling with [Timely artist] George Klein. Mike went to Stan Lee and said, 'Stan, I want her fired, and if she doesn't get fired, I'm going to quit'. Well, you couldn't ever tell Stan Lee what to do. Stan said, 'Well, Mike, it's been nice knowing you'.

Sekowsky, one of the nascent Marvel Comics' mainstays, chose to remain and "make George's life hell". Nonetheless, Barclay recalled the staff often having cocktails together at Longchamps, the Empire State Building's ground-floor restaurant, and found Timely "a pleasant place to work".

Of her personal life during this time, Barclay said in 2004 that, "I was married before I met Mike, but my husband's divorce was not final. ... His wife sent him divorce papers, and they were dated after our marriage. [I] had to go to court and get an annulment. Mike paid for it and it cost $350". Later, in the early 1950s, she married a man named Johnny Smith.

Barclay panels from a 1954 issue of Ace Periodicals' Complete Love Magazine

After leaving Timely in 1949, Barclay freelanced, doing inking on D.S. Publishing's crime comic Exposed (1949), and both penciling and inking stories for Standard's Intimate Love (1951–53); DC Comics (1952); American Comics Group (1952–54); and the Ace Periodicals comic book Complete Love Magazine (1954), as well as for St. John Publications (1953). Most of her freelance comics work was in the romance genre.

Bellman recalled in 2005, "I knew her well before my Timely days. She was called Violet back then but she was always changing her name. She was a bit of a loner who was always by herself. But she was an exquisitely beautiful young lady. She was a staff inker. I remember she would use India ink with a brush for mascara."

=== Later life and career ===
In the mid-1950s, during an industry downturn, Barclay left comics, unable to find work in the field. Though her natural hair color "was dark, almost black," she "became a platinum blond fashion model". Unsuccessful, she left after a year to become a waitress, followed by stints as a hostess for various restaurants.

She eventually segued into fashion illustration, working for some years for such national retail chains as Lane Bryant and Abraham & Straus. She continued studying art as late as 2001, when Barclay, who suffered from osteoporosis, fractured several bones after tripping over an easel at the Art Students League. She retired with the advent of computer graphics, and, as of 2004, lived in New York City and painted re-creations of John Singer Sargent portraits.

=== Death ===
Barclay died on February 26, 2010, in New York Hospital and was buried at Pine Lawn cemetery in Massapequa, New York.

== Awards ==
- 2017 Inkwell Awards Special Recognition Award. The award was accepted on her behalf by her friend Allen Bellman. At the time of the ceremony, the Inkwell Awards was unable to locate any heirs or family.

== See also ==
- List of female comics creators
