= J. David Spurlock =

American author, illustrator, and editor

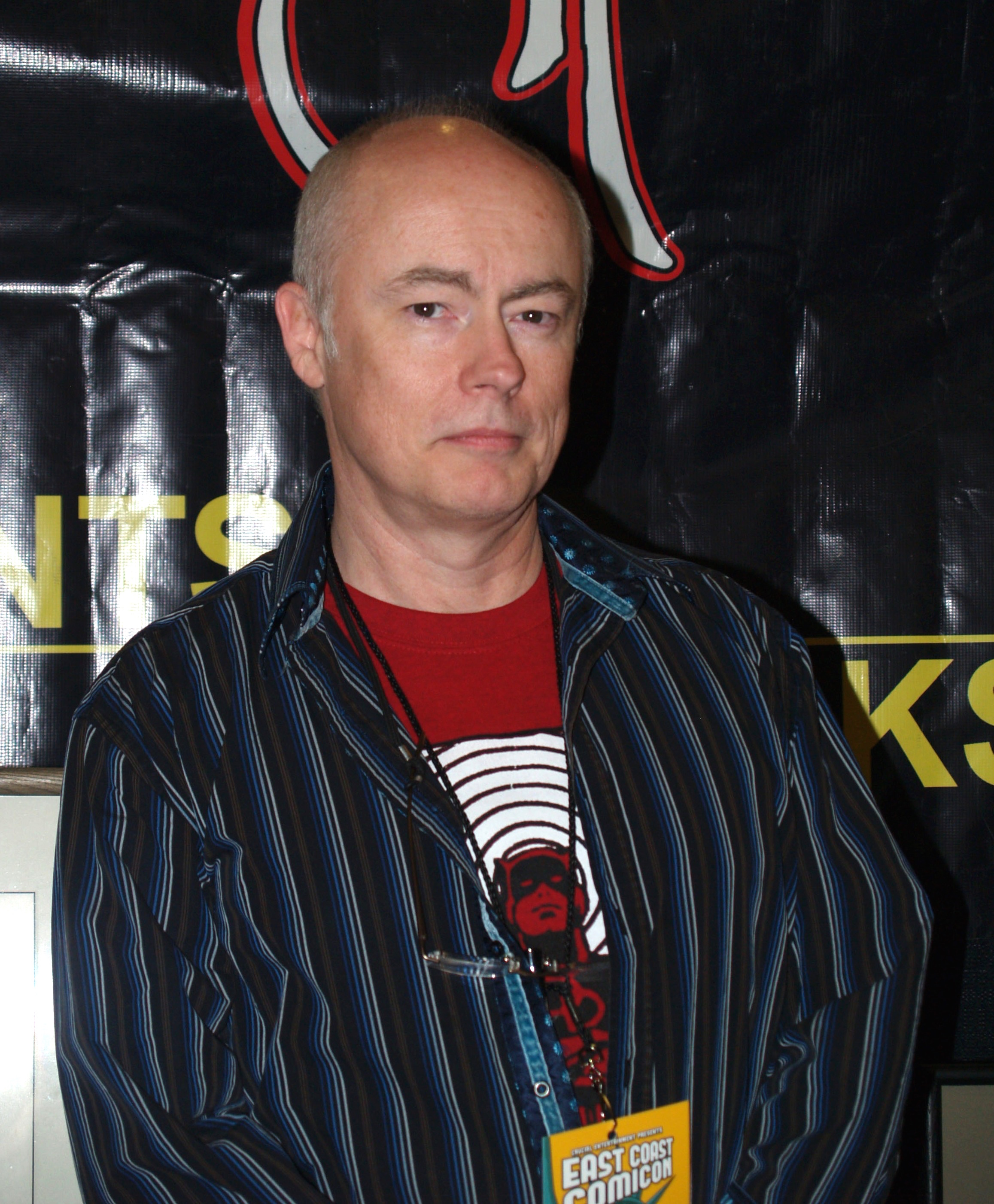
- Spurlock in 2015
- Born: Jess David Spurlock; November 18, 1959 (age 67) Memphis, Tennessee, U.S.
- Areas: Writer, Penciller, Editor

Jess David Spurlock (born November 18, 1959) is an American author, illustrator, editor, and artist's-rights advocate best known as the founder of Vanguard Productions, a publisher of art books, graphic novels, and prints.

== Early life ==
J. David Spurlock was born on November 18, 1959, in Memphis, Tennessee. He moved to Dallas, Texas in 1973.

== Career ==
He has taught art at The University of Texas at Arlington, the Joe Kubert School, and the School of Visual Arts in New York. He has served as a president of the Dallas Society of Illustrators.

As a comic book artist, he co-penciled and inked the alternative press comic Sparkplug #1 (March 1993), from Heroic Publishing's Hero Comics imprint, credited as David Spurlock. The following year he contributed a text page to a Dallas, Texas, tribute comic honoring industry legend Jack Kirby, who had recently died.

Spurlock founded Vanguard Productions in 1993, although he had used that name, in conjunction with Sparrowlake Enterprises, to self-publish the comic book Badge #1 in 1981. The company initially had been founded to publish a comics anthology, Tales from the Edge, with 15 issues released as of 2010. The company then moved into art books, biographies and eventually graphic novels, including Neal Adams' Monsters (2003), (originally serialized in the comics anthology series Echoes of Future Past, published by Adams' Continuity Studios), with four additional story pages plus additional Adams material. DC Comics editor Julius Schwartz, an architect of the Silver Age of Comic Books, said "Spurlock's line of books serve as the vanguard of Silver Age comics histories." Other comics magazines and collections published by Vanguard beginning in 2001 include Space Cowboy, Jesse James Classic Western Collection, Steve Ditko: Space Wars and Wally Wood's The Complete Lunar Tunes and The Wizard King.

In an article on the Fort Worth, Texas, comics artist Pat Boyette, Don Mangus, who assisted Spurlock during this time, wrote of the early Vanguard comics that,

David was showcasing top-flight magazine illustrators and comic book talents in his Tales from the Edge comic book title[, in which he] either reprinted underexposed, hard-to-find 'gems', or debuted intensely personal (and thus unseen in the staid, traditional illustration markets) projects that the creators were eager to see displayed for public distribution. The initial concept ... was to combine the modern, cutting-edge illustrators such as Barron Storey, Marshall Arisman, Bill Sienkiewicz, George Pratt, etc., legends in the editorial realm of magazine illustration, with the more traditional and mainstream graphic storytelling by comic book veterans such as Pat Boyette, Wally Wood, and Howard Nostrand (often through reprints). Bridging this mix was to be David Spurlock's own quasi-retro, 1950s-styled space-western [feature], "Rick Montana, Space Cowboy", which he would draw in a genre-appropriate [Al] Williamson/'Fleagle'-homage art style.

== Philanthropic works ==
Spurlock co-created the Wally Wood Scholarship Fund with Wood's brother, Glenn Wood, for students of the School of Visual Arts. In a joint venture with Marvel Comics and Diamond Comic Distributors, Vanguard Productions in 2002 sponsored artist Jim Steranko's "The Spirit of America" benefit print, created to fund an art scholarship "for victims of anti-American terrorism". There is no public record of recipients, if any, of these grants or scholarships and it is unknown if they're still being offered.

In 2008, Spurlock, with artist and publisher Neal Adams and the David S. Wyman Institute for Holocaust Studies Arts & Letters Council, spearheaded a petition campaign in which over 450 comic book creators and cartoonists urged the Auschwitz-Birkenau State Museum to return to artist Dina Babbitt seven portraits she was forced to paint in the Auschwitz death camp in 1944.

== Awards and nominations ==
Vanguard Productions' Hal Foster: Prince of Illustrators, Father of the Adventure Strip was a finalist for a 2003 Independent Publisher Book Award (the IPPY) in the "Popular Culture" category. It was nominated for a 2002 Eisner Award for "Best Comics-Related Book".

Vanguard's Wally's World: The Brilliant Life and Tragic Death of Wally Wood, the World's Second-Best Comic Book Artist (2004), by Spurlock and Steve Sarger, was nominated for a 2007 Eisner Award for "Best Comics-Related Book".

The original self-published limited edition of The Art of Nick Cardy by John Coates (Coates Publishing, 1999), which was reissued in a wider edition by Vanguard in 2001, was nominated for a 2000 Eisner Award for "Best Comics-Related Book".

In March 2011, he was named Inkwell Awards Special Ambassador. He still holds that recognition at present.

== Legal issues ==
In June 2025, Jesse David Spurlock was sanctioned by the United States District Court for the Middle District of Florida in Frazetta Properties, LLC et al. v. Vanguard Productions, LLC and Jesse David Spurlock (Case No. 8:22-cv-581-WFJ-AEP). The court found that Spurlock had misrepresented a 2015 document as being signed by members of the Frazetta family to falsely suggest a license agreement existed. Forensic evidence confirmed the signatures were not authentic, a fact the defense later admitted. The court determined that Spurlock “fooled the Court (and the lawyers),” reinstated summary judgment in favor of the Frazetta plaintiffs, and ordered Spurlock to pay their attorney fees.

The case stems from a copyright dispute over the use of Frank Frazetta's “Death Dealer” images in a coffee table art book. In 2022, Frazetta Properties sued Spurlock and Vanguard Productions for unauthorized publication and false claims of licensing authority.

== Bibliography as author, editor and/or publisher ==
- Steranko, Jim. Steranko: Graphic Prince of Darkness (1998)
- Spurlock, J. David, ed. The Al Williamson Sketchbook (1998): ISBN 978-1-887591-03-4
- Schumer, Arlen, compiler, The Sketch Book a.k.a. Neal Adams: The Sketch Book (1999): ISBN 978-1-887591-05-8
- Spurlock, J. David, and Bill Pearson, compilers. Wally Wood Sketchbook (2001): ISBN 978-1-887591-08-9
- Infantino, Carmine, with J. David Spurlock. The Amazing World of Carmine Infantino (2000): ISBN 978-1-887591-12-6
- Pratt, George, compiler. Jeffrey Jones Sketchbook (2000): ISBN 978-1-887591-10-2
- Motter, Dean, and J. David Spurlock, compilers. Echoes: Drawings of Michael William Kaluta (2000): ISBN 978-1-887591-14-0
- Coates, John. The Art of Nick Cardy (2001): ISBN 978-1-887591-22-5. Originally Coates Publishing limited edition, 1999
- Spurlock, J. David, and John Buscema. John Buscema Sketchbook (2001): ISBN 978-1-887591-19-5
- Zeno, Eddy. Curt Swan: A Life in Comics (2002): ISBN 978-1-887591-40-9
- Kane, Brian. Hal Foster: Prince of Illustrators, Father of the Adventure Strip (2002): ISBN 978-1-887591-25-6
- Adams, Neal. Monsters a.k.a. Neal Adams Monsters (2003): ISBN 978-1-887591-57-7
- Spurlock, J. David, and John Romita. John Romita Sketchbook (2002): ISBN 978-1-887591-29-4
- RGK: The Art of Roy G. Krenkel (hardcover 2004; trade paperback 2005): ISBN 978-1-887591-52-2
- Sarger, Steve, and J. David Spurlock. Wally's World: The Brilliant Life and Tragic Death of Wally Wood, the World's Second-Best Comic Book Artist (2004): ISBN 978-1-887591-80-5
- The Thrilling Comic Book Cover Art of Alex Schomburg (2004): ISBN 978-1-887591-66-9
- Spurlock, J. David, compiler. Grand Master of Adventure Art: The Drawings of J. Allen St. John (2005): ISBN 978-1-887591-61-4
- Gammill, Kerry, and J. David Spurlock, eds. Famous Monster Movie Art of Basil Gogos (2005): ISBN 978-1-887591-72-0
- Korshak, Stephen D. The Paintings of J. Allen St. John: Grand Master of Fantasy (2008 limited edition): ISBN 978-1-887591-88-1
- Spurlock, J. David, compiler. Mythos: Fantasy Art Realms of Frank Brunner (2007): ISBN 978-1-887591-92-8
