= Inkwell Awards =

Trophy given in the field of inking in American comic books

Inkwell Award
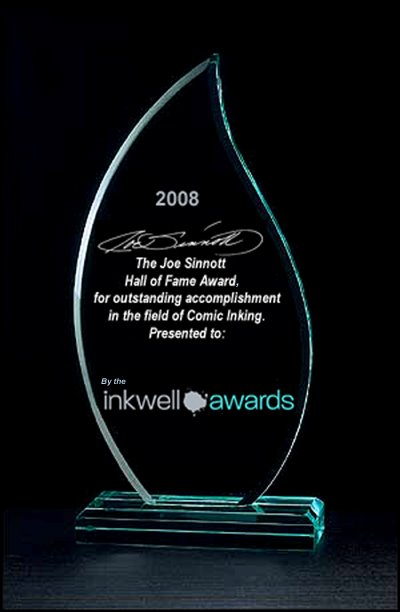
- Awarded for: Excellence in comic book inking
- Country: United States
- Presented by: The Inkwell Awards Committee
- Established: July 2008; 18 years ago
- Website: www.inkwellawards.com

The Inkwell Award, sometimes shortened to the Inkwells, is an award given for inking in American comic books.

== History ==
In January 2008, Bob Almond proposed establishing an award to recognize comic book inkers. Founding members included artists Tim Townsend, Jim Tournas, Bill Nichols, and writer Daniel Best, with support from artist Adam Hughes and DC Comics editor Mike Marts.

The Hall of Fame Award was named in honor of Joe Sinnott.

In memory of artist Dave Simons, the Dave Simons Inkwell Memorial Scholarship was established, offering a $1,000 annual award to a Joe Kubert School of Cartoon and Graphic Art student.

Wizard Entertainment sponsored the first live Inkwell Awards presentation at The New England Comic Con in October 2010. In 2011, Heroes Convention became the host for the annual live presentation ceremony. The Inkwell Awards moved to the Great Philadelphia Comic Con in Oaks, Pennsylvania, in 2019.

Live awards presentations were suspended from 2020 due to the COVID-19 pandemic. In 2024, the Hershey Comic Con was announced as the new venue for live awards presentations.

== Contributors ==
The Inkwell Awards are funded via donations. In 2010, a book produced by Jimmy Tournas at the Boston Comic Con raised funds for the awards.

Artist Dan Panosian designed the Inkwell Awards logo. Randy Green designed the Inkwell spokesperson costume.

== Award winners ==
=== MVP Award ===
- 2008 Danny Miki

=== The Call of Duty Award ===
- 2008 Bob Almond

=== Favorite Finisher / Embellisher ===
- 2008 (retro)Tom Palmer/ (modern) Kevin Nowlan

=== Most-Prolific Inker ===
- 2008 Danny Miki

=== Favorite Inker ===
Favorite ink artists over the pencil work of another artist from award year cover-dated, interior, American comic book material.

- 2008 (retro) Terry Austin and Joe Sinnott (tie) / (modern) Danny Miki
- 2009 Wade Von Grawbadger
- 2010 Mark Morales
- 2011 Scott Hanna
- 2012 Mark Farmer
- 2013 Klaus Janson
- 2014 Norm Rapmund
- 2015 Victor Olazaba
- 2016 Joe Prado
- 2017 Scott Hanna
- 2018 Scott Hanna
- 2019 Walden Wong
- 2020 Walden Wong
- 2021 Ruy José
- 2022 Eber Ferreira
- 2023 Walden Wong
- 2024 Wade Von Grawbadger
- 2025 Elisabetta D'Amico
- 2026 Scott Williams

Most-Adaptable Inker
Ink artist "showing ink style versatility" in award year interior, cover-dated, American comic book material.

- 2008 Danny Miki
- 2009 Tim Townsend
- 2010 Scott Hanna
- 2011 Scott Hanna
- 2012 Scott Hanna
- 2013 Jonathan Glapion
- 2014 Walden Wong
- 2015 Walden Wong
- 2016 Walden Wong
- 2017 Walden Wong
- 2018 Scott Hanna
- 2019 Walden Wong
- 2020 Walden Wong
- 2021 Norm Rapmund
- 2022 Norm Rapmund
- 2023 Walden Wong
- 2024 Elisabetta D'Amico
- 2025 Elisabetta D'Amico
- 2026 Elisabetta D'Amico

=== Props Award ===
Ink artists "deserving of more attention" for their work from award year interior cover-dated American comic book material.

- 2008 Danny Miki
- 2009 Matt Ryan
- 2010 Jonathan Glapion
- 2011 Art Thibert
- 2012 Scott Hanna
- 2013 Eber Ferreira
- 2014 Walden Wong
- 2015 Wade Von Grawbadger
- 2016 Wade Von Grawbadger
- 2017 Scott Hanna
- 2018 Joe Prado
- 2019 Elisabetta D'Amico
- 2020 Eber Ferreira
- 2021 Eber Ferreira
- 2022 Tim Townsend
- 2023 Adriano Di Benedetto
- 2024 Elisabetta D'Amico
- 2025 Adriano Di Benedetto
- 2026 Tony Kordos

=== The "SPAMI" Award (Small Press and Mainstream-Independent) ===
Favorite Small Press And Mainstream-Independent award year interior, cover-dated, American comic book ink work over another pencil artist (non-Marvel or DC work).

- 2009 Tim Townsend
- 2010 Dan Parsons
- 2011 Cliff Rathburn
- 2012 Dexter Vines
- 2013 Sal Buscema
- 2014 Andrew Pepoy
- 2015 Dan Parsons
- 2016 Stefano Gaudiano
- 2017 Jonathan Glapion
- 2018 Sal Buscema
- 2019 Stefano Gaudiano
- 2020 Stefano Gaudiano
- 2021 Adelso Corona
- 2022 Adelso Corona
- 2023 David Cabeza
- 2024 Terry Moore
- 2025 Tony Kordos
- 2026 Tony Kordos

=== The All-in-One Award ===
Artists known for inking their own pencil work in award year interior, cover-dated, American comic book material.

- 2009 Mike Mignola
- 2010 Amanda Conner
- 2011 Francis Manapul
- 2012 J.H. Williams
- 2013 Skottie Young
- 2014 Stan Sakai
- 2015 Fiona Staples
- 2016 Jason Fabok
- 2017 Erik Larsen
- 2018 Liam Sharp
- 2019 Lee Weeks
- 2020 Liam Sharp
- 2021 Chris Samnee
- 2022 Walter Simonson
- 2023 Nir Levie
- 2024 Salvador Larroca
- 2025 Chris Samnee
- 2026 Liam Sharp

=== Special Recognition Award ===
The Special Recognition Award (SRA) a.k.a. the Stacey Aragon Special Recognition Award (SASRA) in honor of the Inkwells supporter "who passed after a decade-long battle with cancer".

- 2015 Bernie Wrightson
- 2016 Vince Colletta
- 2017 Allen Milgrom and Violet Barclay. The award for Violet Barclay was accepted posthumously by Allen Bellman.
- 2018 Russ Heath
- 2019 Jack Davis and Marie Severin
- 2020 Allen Bellman, Sal Buscema, and Norman Lee
- 2021 Wendy Pini, Alfredo Alcala, and Frank Frazetta
- 2022 George Pérez, Gene Day, John Severin, and Dave Stevens
- 2023 Danny Bulanadi, Reed Crandall, and Dave Simons
- 2024 John Totleben, George Klein, and Graham Ingels
- 2025 Mike DeCarlo, Walter Simonson, and Bob Smith
- 2026 Sy Barry, P. Craig Russell, and Joe Staton

=== The Joe Sinnott Hall of Fame Award ===
A hall of fame designation for an inking career in American comic books (lifetime achievement, 25 years minimum; two winners chosen annually).

- 2008 Joe Sinnott
- 2009 Terry Austin and Dick Giordano
- 2010 Klaus Janson and Al Williamson
- 2011 Wally Wood and Kevin Nowlan
- 2012 Mark McKenna and Scott Williams
- 2013 Dick Ayers and Murphy Anderson
- 2014 Joe Simon and Tom Palmer
- 2015 Joe Kubert and Steve Ditko
- 2016 Frank Giacoia and Josef Rubinstein
- 2017 Jerry Ordway and Rudy Nebres
- 2018 Joe Giella and Bob McLeod
- 2019 Neal Adams and Dan Adkins
- 2020 Bob Layton, John Romita Sr., and Bernie Wrightson
- 2021 Mike Esposito, Pablo Marcos, Sal Buscema, and Mike Royer
- 2022 Brett Breeding and Bob Wiacek
- 2023 Frank Frazetta and Syd Shores
- 2024 Chic Stone and Ernie Chan
- 2025 Allen Milgrom and Keith Williams
- 2026 Jack Abel and Steve Leialoha

=== Above and Beyond Award ===
In celebration of the 10th anniversary in 2018, Almond created this award for organization members or non-members who have made "special efforts".

- 2018: Hailey Skaza-Gagne for her fundraising and event contributions; Robert Haines, for his 10 years on the Inkwell Nomination Committee; Mark Sinnott for his work as Senior Inkwell Contributor for a decade and for his work in fundraising for the Inkwells.
- 2019: Michael Hoskin, the second member to annually serve on the Inkwell Awards nomination committee; Shelton Drum, organizer/promoter of Heroes Con, the show to host the Inkwell Awards ceremonies from 2011 to 2018.
- 2020: none
- 2021: Bob Bretall and Johnny B. Gerardy for ten years of Nomination Committee service.
- 2022: Michele Witchipoo for ten years of Nomination Committee service.
- 2023: Rik Offenberger and Tony Parker for ten years of Nomination Committee service; Keith Williams for involvement in the Joe Sinnott Inking and Tribute Challenges.
- 2024: Edward Harris, Jim Johnson, Michael Hoskin, and Mike Pascale.
- 2025: Richard Boom and First Comics News
- 2026 Bob Bretall, for 15 years on the nomination committee

In 2025, a special award was awarded to Larry Lieber, who was given the honorary Keeper of the Flame Award for his seven decades of career achievement in the comic book industry as a writer, editor, and artist which includes inking.

== Ambassadors ==
The position of ambassador recognizes creators for their support for the Inkwell Awards. Unless noted otherwise, all ambassadors continue to hold this position.

=== Special Ambassadors ===
- Joe Sinnott, 2012 until his death in June 2020 (artist)
- Mike McKone, July 2010 (artist)
- J. David Spurlock, March 2011 (publisher, editor, author, artist, and advocate)
- Clifford Meth, August 2014 (writer and advocate)
- Aldrin "Buzz" Aw, January 2018 (artist) until June 2025.
- Rags Morales, September 2018 (artist)
- Dan Parsons, September 2018 (artist)
- Mark Sinnott and Joe Prado, January 2021
- Dan DiDio, August 2022 (writer, editor, and publisher)
- Gail Simone, July 2025 (writer)
- Dan Panosian, July 2025 (artist)
- Bill Morrison, July 2025 (artist, writer, editor)

=== Ambassadors ===
These supporting artists who help advocate for inkers are called ambassadors.

- Adam Hughes, February 2008 (artist)
- Mike Marts, February 2008 – August 2018 (editor), inactive
- Sal Velluto, July 2010 (artist)
- Mark Brooks, June 2010 (artist)
- Trevor Von Eeden, July 2010 (artist)
- Cully Hamner, June 2011 (artist)
- Joe Kubert, September 2011 until his death in August 2012 (artist, author, editor, and legend)
- Eric Basaldua, September 2011 (artist)
- Phil Jimenez, September 2011 (artist)
- Jim Shooter, January 2012 until his death June 2025 (writer and editor)
- Brian Pulido, October 2012 (artist, writer, editor, and publisher)
- Jim Starlin, August 2014 (artist and writer)
- Laura Martin, August 2014 (colorist)
- Rich Buckler, 2015 until his death in May 2017 (artist)

== Guests of honor and keynote speakers ==
At many of the live ceremonies, notable comic book creators were invited as guests of honor and keynote speakers.

- 2011: Dan Panosian, Keynote Speaker and Tim Townsend, Presenter
- 2012: Bob McLeod, Keynote Speaker and Ethan Van Sciver, Presenter
- 2013: Jimmy Palmiotti, Keynote Speaker; Cully Hamner, Presenter; J. David Spurlock, Presenter Hall of Fame
- 2014: Bill Sienkiewicz, Guest of Honor; Dexter Vines, Presenter; Steve Saffel and Ron Garney, Presenters Hall of Fame
- 2015: Klaus Janson, Guest of Honor; Mike McKone & Mark McKenna, Presenters; Orion Zangara & Craig Yoe, Presenters Hall of Fame; Scott Hampton, Presenter Special Recognition Award
- 2016: Jim Steranko, Special Appearance; J. David Spurlock, Presenter Special Recognition Award; Todd Dezago & Mike Grell, Presenters Hall of Fame
- 2017: Joe Giella, Guest of Honor and Allen Bellman, Guest Speaker and Presenter SASRA; Mike Pascale, Presenter
- 2018: Mike Royer, Guest of Honor; Dan Panosian, Presenter; Pat Broderick, Presenter lifetime achievement
- 2019: Mark McKenna, Guest of Honor; Larry Hama & J. David Spurlock, Presenters Hall of Fame
- 2024: Keith Williams, Presenter; Geof Isherwood, Presenter SASRA; Mark Sinnott, J. David Spurlock, & Bill Morrison, Presenters Hall of Fame
- 2025: Scott Hanna, Presenter; Mark Sinnott, Presenter Hall of Fame
- 2026: Kevin Conrad, Presenter; Steve Geiger and Don McGregor, Guest Speakers;
