= Tales of the Jedi =

Tales of the Jedi may refer to various media in the Star Wars universe:

- Tales of the Jedi (comics), a comic book series published by Dark Horse comics from 1993 to 1998
- Tales of the Jedi (TV series), a 2022 TV series
