= Bob Almond =

American comic book inker

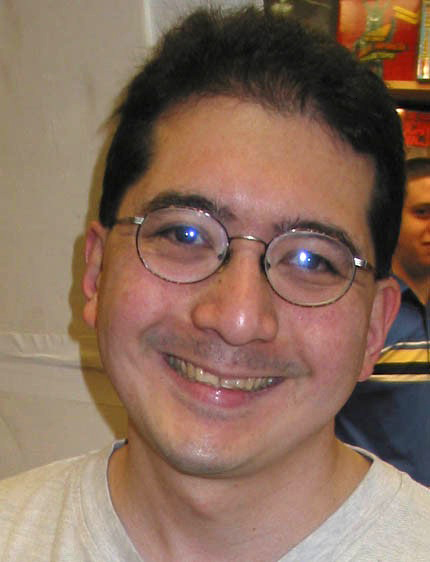
- Bob Almond
- Born: Robert "Bob" Almond; January 4, 1967 (age 59) Seoul, South Korea
- Area: Inker
- Notable works: Warlock and the Infinity Watch, Black Panther, Annihilation: Conquest: Quasar
- Awards: Inkwell Award, The Call of Duty Award (2008)

Bob Almond (born January 4, 1967) is an American comic book inker whose credits include the Marvel Comics publications Warlock and the Infinity Watch, Black Panther and Annihilation: Conquest: Quasar. Almond is also known for his spearheading of the Inkwell Awards to honor comics inkers.

== Early life ==
Almond became interested in comics by age nine. As a young teen, he began drawing the independent comic book Torpedo Comics with his friends and his brother Mike. He majored in illustration at the University of Massachusetts Dartmouth and graduated in 1990 with a BFA in Illustration.

== Career ==
Almond's entry into the comic book industry came as a result of the efforts of fellow artists Bernie Wrightson and Jim Starlin. In October 1991, Almond met Wrightson at Wrightson's annual Halloween party. Starlin convinced his editor at Marvel Comics to hire Almond as Terry Austin's replacement as inker on Warlock and the Infinity Watch.

Almond moved on to other projects in 1999, freelancing on such titles as Black Panther, Annihilation: Conquest - Quasar, Heroes for Hire, and Star Trek: Deep Space Nine. He has worked for publishers including DC Comics, Penny-Farthing Press, Malibu Comics, Acclaim Comics, Wildstorm, IDW Publishing, Harris Publications, Valiant Comics, and Kingstone Media. In February 2018, the film Black Panther thanked him in its credits, along with other creators. He and many other Black Panther creators were flown to Los Angeles for a screening of the film on January 29, 2018. On October 26, 2022, the world premiere of Black Panther: Wakanda Forever was released with Almond and his storyteller creative partners receiving "Special Thanks" in the end credits.

=== Award and accolades ===
From 2006 to 2009, Almond wrote the column "Inkblots" in Sketch magazine. During those years, he also unofficially assisted the Comics Buyer's Guide in identifying and crediting inkers. This led him in 2008 to found the Inkwell Awards, to honor comic book inkers. Since January 2008, Almond has served on the Inkwell Awards committee as its founder, director, and treasurer. He introduced the concept of Ms. Inkwell, the promotional model and personification of the Awards.
