= Star Wars: Dawn of the Jedi =

Comic book series

- Star Wars: Dawn of the Jedi Issue #0

Publication information
- Publisher: Dark Horse Comics
- Schedule: Quasi-monthly
- Format: Miniseries
- Genre: Science fiction
- Publication date: 2012–2014
- No. of issues: 15

Creative team
- Written by: John Ostrander
- Penciller: Jan Duursema
- Inker: Dan Parsons
- Colorist: Wes Dzioba

Star Wars: Dawn of the Jedi is an American comic book series set in the Star Wars universe. The series, published by Dark Horse Comics, is written by John Ostrander, penciled by Jan Duursema, inked by Dan Parsons, and colored by Wes Dzioba. It is set in the earliest days of the Jedi Order, beginning 36,453 years before the events of the original Star Wars film. A preview issue, #0, was released on February 1, 2012, and followed by the first issue on February 15, 2012. Dawn of the Jedi ended after the third arc since Marvel Comics acquired the Star Wars comic license in 2015. The miniseries concluded with the last issue, Force Wars #5, released on March 19, 2014.

== Characters ==
=== Protagonists ===
- Shae Koda: A Human female of Dathomirian descent whose parents were killed in the Despot War. She has an incessant curiosity, which means she does not accept things on blind faith. She is young, brave, rash, and a bit reckless.
- Sek'nos Rath: A young Sith-species male whose parents are Je'daii (what the Jedi are called in this time period), diplomats who travel the system. He was raised by his maternal grandmother and paternal grandfather, who are both Je'daii masters. He is charming but also driven. He wants to do great things like Je'daii who came before him. He yearns for adventure and likes to push the envelope. He's bold, rowdy, and loves fun, weapons, and females of all types.
- Tasha Ryo: A female Twi'lek whose parents are Baron Volnos Ryo and Kora Ryo. She's often torn between her father and their clan and her mother and her Je'daii duties. She prefers not to use weapons, instead preferring Force techniques that use the Force as a weapon and a shield. She is very calm and emphatic. She looks before she leaps and tries to understand the repercussions of her actions.
- Xesh: A mysterious and powerful being, Rakatan slave called a Force Hound. His arrival on Tython sets the whole series in motion.

=== Other characters ===
- Ketu: Je'daii master of Akar Kesh. Little else is known about them at this time.
- Daegen Lok: A Je'daii. Little else is known about them at this time.
- Baron Volnos Ryo: Husband of Kora Ryo and father of Tasha Ryo. He is a clan lord on the planet Shikaakwa.
- Hawk Ryo: A Twi'lek Ranger. Little else is known about them at this time.
- Kora Ryo: Wife of Baron Volnos Ryo and mother of Tasha Ryo. She is the Je'daii master of Kaleth, the Temple of Knowledge.
- Predor Skal'nas: A Rakatan. Little else is known about them at this time.
- Trill: A Force Hound connected with Xesh. A slave of Predor Skal'nas.

== Reception ==
The series was well-received, receiving many positive reviews.

- Star Wars: Dawn of the Jedi: Force Storm has an average rating of 8.2 based on 20 critic reviews aggregated by Comic Book Roundup.
- Star Wars: Dawn of the Jedi: Prisoner of Bogan has an average rating of 9.0 based on 9 critic reviews aggregated by Comic Book Roundup.
- Star Wars: Dawn of the Jedi: Force War has an average rating of 8.8 based on 20 critic reviews aggregated by Comic Book Roundup.

== Issues ==
- Dawn of the Jedi #0 (Color 32 Pages, February 1, 2012) $3.50
- Dawn of the Jedi #01: Force Storm, Part 1 of 5 (Color 32 Pages, February 15, 2012) $3.50
- Dawn of the Jedi #02: Force Storm, Part 2 of 5 (Color 32 Pages, March 21, 2012) $3.50
- Dawn of the Jedi #03: Force Storm, Part 3 of 5 (Color 32 Pages, April 18, 2012) $3.50
- Dawn of the Jedi #04: Force Storm, Part 4 of 5 (Color 32 Pages, May 16, 2012) $3.50
- Dawn of the Jedi #05: Force Storm, Part 5 of 5 (Color 32 Pages, June 20, 2012) $3.50
- Dawn of the Jedi #06: The Prisoner of Bogan, Part 1 of 5 (Color 32 Pages, November 28, 2012) $2.99
- Dawn of the Jedi #07: The Prisoner of Bogan, Part 2 of 5 (Color 32 Pages, December 19, 2012) $2.99
- Dawn of the Jedi #08: The Prisoner of Bogan, Part 3 of 5 (Color 32 Pages, February 27, 2013) $2.99
- Dawn of the Jedi #09: The Prisoner of Bogan, Part 4 of 5 (Color 32 Pages, March 27, 2013) $2.99
- Dawn of the Jedi #10: The Prisoner of Bogan, Part 5 of 5 (Color 32 Pages, May 22, 2013) $2.99
- Dawn of the Jedi #11: Force Wars, Part 1 of 5 (Color 32 Pages, November 20, 2013) $3.50
- Dawn of the Jedi #12: Force Wars, Part 2 of 5 (Color 32 Pages, December 18, 2013) $3.50
- Dawn of the Jedi #13: Force Wars, Part 3 of 5 (Color 32 Pages, January 15, 2014) $3.50
- Dawn of the Jedi #14: Force Wars, Part 4 of 5 (Color 32 Pages, February 19, 2014) $3.50
- Dawn of the Jedi #15: Force Wars, Part 5 of 5 (Color 32 Pages, March 19, 2014) $3.50

== Trade paperbacks ==
- Force Storm (#1–5)
- The Prisoner of Bogan (#6–10)
- Force War (#11–15)
- Star Wars Legends Epic Collection: Tales of the Jedi Vol. 1 (#0-15)

== Novel ==
Into the Void, a Dawn of the Jedi novel written by fantasy author Tim Lebbon, was released May 7, 2013. ISBN 978-0345541932

== Legacy ==
Not long after its release, in April 2014, the comic and tie-in novel were declared non-canon due to Lucasfilm's redefining of the canon to make way for the sequel trilogy.

In the 2021–2022 streaming series The Book of Boba Fett, Tatooine was canonically depicted as once having been an oceanic planet, as the comic had established.

A film set during the early Dawn of the Jedi timeline is in development.

== See also ==
- Star Wars: The High Republic
- Tales of the Jedi
