= George Klein (comics) =

American comic book artist (died 1969)

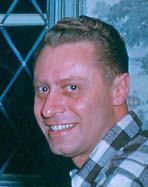
- Klein in late 1950s or early 1960s
- Born: George D. Klein c. 1915 or 1920
- Died: 1969
- Area: Inker
- Pseudonyms: Nick Karlton; Mark Midnight
- Awards: Inkwell Awards: 2024 SASRA

George D. Klein (c. 1915 or 1920 – 1969) was an American comic book artist whose career stretched from the 1930s and 1940s' Golden Age of comic books until his death in 1969. He was best known as an inker for DC Comics, where he was an integral part of the Superman family of titles from 1955 to 1968, and for Marvel Comics, where he was the generally recognized, uncredited inker on Jack Kirby's pencil art for the landmark comic book The Fantastic Four #1.

== Biography ==
=== Early career ===
Sub-Mariner Comics #5 (Spring 1942): Rare George Klein inks on one of Timely's "big three" heroes. Pencils by Al Gabriele.

Klein attended the Kansas City Art Institute and New York's Cartoonists and Illustrators School. At Marvel Comics' 1940s precursor, Timely Comics, Klein was both a penciler and an inker, initially on superhero features. He was among the pencilers of the super-speedster the Whizzer, in All Winners Comics #8–9 (Spring-Summer 1943). He had inked that early Marvel character, over Mike Sekowsky's pencils, as early as All Winners #3 (Winter 1941/42). Klein also worked on the characters Miss America (inking the premiere issue in 1944), the Young Allies, the Black Marvel, the Golden Age Black Widow, the Defender, and, under the pseudonym Nick Karlton, the Challenger. Klein found himself more utilized, however, in what was called Timely's "animator" bullpen, which created such movie tie-in and original talking animal comics as Mighty Mouse and Animated Funny Comic-Tunes.

Because he was on staff, Klein frequently did not sign his artwork – a typical though not ironclad industry habit at the time – making it difficult to assess his Golden Age output.

In the post-war era, Klein drew for a variety of publishers. For DC Comics, nearly ten years before teaming with penciler Curt Swan on various Superman titles, Klein inked him on a "Boy Commandos" story in World's Finest Comics #21 (March–April 1946). For American Comics Group (ACG), Klein worked on such horror/suspense titles as Adventures into the Unknown, Forbidden Worlds, and Out of the Night. For Atlas Comics, Marvel's 1950s iteration, Klein penciled but mostly inked stories for such comics as Marvel Tales, Sports Action, Wild Western, and Space Squadron, for which he drew the backup feature "Blast Revere". By late in the decade he was also doing stories for Prize Comics' Black Magic.

=== Superman family ===
Adventure Comics #360 (Sept. 1967): Klein inking penciler Curt Swan

In 1955, Klein began his long association with penciler Curt Swan on a variety of titles in DC Comics' "Superman family", edited by Mort Weisinger. Starting with uncredited but generally recognized inks over Swan in Superboy #38 (Jan. 1955) – on a backup story featuring the Boy of Steel vs. "Public Chimp Number One!" – Klein soon took on the lead features there and in Adventure Comics, starring Superboy; Superman, starting in late 1961; and DC's flagship title, Action Comics, starring Superman, in 1962. Later in the 1960s, Klein became the chief inker on Adventure's lead feature, the Legion of Super-Heroes, by writer Jim Shooter and penciler Swan, helping set the visual foundation for what would become one of DC's most popular series.

In 1968, with new art director and soon-to-be editorial director Carmine Infantino given the mandate to revitalize DC in the wake of rival Marvel's pop-cultural and industry ascendancy, Klein was eased out along with such other Superman-family artists as Wayne Boring, Jim Mooney, and George Papp, and writers Otto Binder, Edmond Hamilton, and Jerry Siegel (Superman's co-creator with Joe Shuster). Klein's final DC work was Adventure Comics #367 (May 1968).

=== Marvel Comics ===
In 1961, penciler Jack Kirby and writer-editor Stan Lee began revitalizing comics with the superhero team the Fantastic Four. The team's first two issues were published without formal creator credits, in the manner of times, and their inker has never been definitively established. Before the mid-2000s and the maturity of comics scholarship, inking credit for the landmark issues The Fantastic Four #1–2 (Nov. 1961 – Jan. 1962) was generally attributed to Dick Ayers, a frequent Kirby inker before and after. Since that time, further scholarship has given tentative credit to Klein. The standard Grand Comics Database, for example, unequivocally credits Klein as the primary inker (with possible alterations by Sol Brodsky) based on the analysis of Michael Vassallo and Nick Caputo. That database credits Klein as inker for issue #2 with the caveat, "Inking often attributed to Dick Ayers and occasionally to Art Simek. The credit given reflects the current consensus." Another standard reference, the Unofficial Handbook of Marvel Comics Creators, gives "George Klein?" as inker for issue #1 and "Sol Brodsky? George Klein?" for #2, with the additional note, "On the letter page of Fantastic Four (I) #272 and #281, Sol Brodsky is said to be the inker of this issue."

Daredevil #47 (Dec. 1968): Art by Gene Colan and George Klein

Regardless, Klein was working almost exclusively for DC Comics during this time, known as the Silver Age of Comic Books, until DC's 1968 shakeup (see above). Klein then became one of Marvel's most high-profile inkers in the short time before his death. He embellished John Buscema on a run of The Avengers; Gene Colan on issues #46-49 off that penciler's signature series, Daredevil; and, in his last assignment, Jack Kirby on Thor #168–169 (Sept.-Oct. 1969). Among the Silver Age issues he inked were the Avengers stories that introduced the Vision, Yellowjacket (Hank Pym), and the Clint Barton Goliath, and another with the marriage of Hank Pym and the Wasp, Janet Van Dyne; "Brother, Take My Hand" in Daredevil #47 (Dec. 1968), cited by Stan Lee as one of his favorites among the comic-book stories he wrote; and the cover and interior of one of Barry Windsor-Smith's first U.S. comic books, Daredevil #51 (April 1969).

=== Death ===
Klein died of cirrhosis of the liver, six months after getting married. His death was announced in Marvel Comics' "Bullpen Bulletins" fan page appearing in Fantastic Four #93 and other comics with a December 1969 cover-date.

== Inking style ==
Former Marvel editor-in-chief Roy Thomas, who wrote Marvel Comics' The Avengers during Klein's stint on that superhero title, described Klein's inking as "a Joe Sinnott kind of style. ... [He] could do that Sinnott style that was very popular then."

In its list of "The 20 Greatest Inkers of American Comic Books", historians at the retailer Atlas Comics (no relation to the comics publishers) listed George Klein at #17:

Most likened to Murphy Anderson, George Klein may have had an even more mannered and precise style. Klein, like Anderson (and to a lesser extent, Joe Sinnott) would create wonderful rounded shadows by dropping a well-weighted line and then creating a series of beautifully tapered feathers coming off of it, conforming to the contour of the object he was delineating. It gave those objects volume, and always let you subconsciously know the size, shape and form of what you were looking at. Many modern inkers miss this elementary style of 'investing' two-dimensional objects with the appearance of three dimensions. Often, their lines will be in direct opposition to forms they are supposed to define, or will throw shadows in a way which is counterintuitive to how we see them. Most of them would do well to study George Klein and simplify, simplify, simplify.

== Awards ==
- 2024 Inkwell Awards Stacey Aragon Special Recognition Award (SASRA)
