= Star Wars: Legacy =

American comic book series

- Issue #4

Publication information
- Publisher: Dark Horse Comics
- Format: Ongoing series
- Publication date: June 2006 – August 2010
- No. of issues: 50 + 6
- Main character: Cade Skywalker

Creative team
- Written by: John Ostrander; Jan Duursema
- Penciller: Jan Duursema
- Inker: Dan Parsons
- Letterer: Michael David Thomas
- Colorist: Brad Anderson

Collected editions
- Broken: ISBN 1-59307-716-5

Star Wars: Legacy is an American comic book series set in the Star Wars universe. The series, published by Dark Horse Comics, is written by John Ostrander and Jan Duursema, and illustrated by Duursema and others, with inks by Dan Parsons and color by Brad Anderson. Issue #0, which cost 25¢ and introduced the setting and major characters, was released on June 7, 2006.

Set over 130 years after the fall of Emperor Palpatine and the Galactic Empire, Star Wars: Legacy follows Cade Skywalker, a descendant of Luke Skywalker, as he and several allies eventually bind together in an attempt to defeat Darth Krayt—the new Dark Lord of the Sith—and the reborn Galactic Empire.

It is treated as the final storyline of the now defunct Star Wars Legends continuity, prior to the franchise's buyout by The Walt Disney Company in 2014.

== Publication history ==
Star Wars: Legacy ran from June 2006 until issue #50, published in August 2010.

Dark Horse Comics finished the Star Wars: Legacy story with a six-issue limited series dealing with the return of Darth Krayt titled Star Wars: Legacy War.

In 2012 Dark Horse Comics announced a second volume, Star Wars: Legacy Volume 2. Star Wars: Legacy Volume 2 was canceled after 18 issues in 2014, following the transfer of the Star Wars comic publishing license to Marvel Comics.

== Plot synopsis ==
The story of Star Wars: Legacy starts 126 years after the film Return of the Jedi. The comics feature Cade Skywalker, a descendant of Luke Skywalker, who was trained as a Jedi, but abandoned the New Jedi Order following its defeat by the One Sith. He apprenticed himself to the pirate Rav and lives among bounty hunters, smugglers and pirates such as his best friends Jariah Syn and Deliah Blue. Cade, in an attempt to avoid detection and his destiny, also dropped his last name and Jedi heritage while being reluctantly guided by Luke, now a Force ghost. The series begins with an attack on the Jedi Temple and the overthrow of the Galactic Alliance and the Fel Empire by the Sith.

Along with Cade and his friends, various other characters appear who are set against the Sith; including deposed Emperor Roan Fel and his Imperial faction, the remnants of the Galactic Alliance under Admiral Gar Stazi, and the remaining Jedi. After a large and costly war with the Sith Empire, Cade and his allies manage to kill the evil Sith Emperor, Darth Krayt. However, even without their leader, the Sith remain a powerful danger.

== Issues ==
Key:
Collected (TPB) issue	Released issue	Future issue

Issue	Title	Publication date	Trade paperback	TPB pub date
0	Star Wars Legacy 0	June 7, 2006		
0½	Star Wars Legacy 0½	January 2, 2008		
Broken			Broken; Broken Hardcover; 30th Anniversary Collection Volume 12: Legacy	May 9, 2007
1	Broken, Part 1	June 21, 2006	Broken; Broken Hardcover; 30th Anniversary Collection Volume 12: Legacy	May 9, 2007
2	Broken, Part 2	July 12, 2006	Broken; Broken Hardcover; 30th Anniversary Collection Volume 12: Legacy	May 9, 2007
3	Broken, Part 3	September 13, 2006	Broken; Broken Hardcover; 30th Anniversary Collection Volume 12: Legacy	May 9, 2007
5	Broken, Part 4	November 1, 2006	Broken; Broken Hardcover; 30th Anniversary Collection Volume 12: Legacy	May 9, 2007
6	Broken, Part 5	November 29, 2006	Broken; Broken Hardcover; 30th Anniversary Collection Volume 12: Legacy	May 9, 2007
7	Broken, Part 6	January 10, 2007	Broken; Broken Hardcover; 30th Anniversary Collection Volume 12: Legacy	May 9, 2007
8	Allies	February 14, 2007	Shards	March 19, 2008
4	Noob	October 11, 2006	Shards	March 19, 2008
Trust Issues			Shards	March 19, 2008
9	Trust Issues, Part 1	March 7, 2007	Shards	March 19, 2008
10	Trust Issues, Part 2	March 28, 2007	Shards	March 19, 2008
13	Ready to Die	June 13, 2007	Shards	March 19, 2008
Ghosts			Shards	March 19, 2008
11	Ghosts, Part 1	May 9, 2007	Shards	March 19, 2008
12	Ghosts, Part 2	May 23, 2007	Shards	March 19, 2008
Claws of the Dragon			Claws of the Dragon	June 25, 2008
14	Claws of the Dragon, Part 1	July 11, 2007	Claws of the Dragon	June 25, 2008
15	Claws of the Dragon, Part 2	August 8, 2007	Claws of the Dragon	June 25, 2008
16	Claws of the Dragon, Part 3	September 12, 2007	Claws of the Dragon	June 25, 2008
17	Claws of the Dragon, Part 4	October 31, 2007	Claws of the Dragon	June 25, 2008
18	Claws of the Dragon, Part 5	January 2, 2008	Claws of the Dragon	June 25, 2008
19	Claws of the Dragon, Part 6	February 6, 2008	Claws of the Dragon	June 25, 2008
Indomitable			Alliance	December 24, 2008
20	Indomitable, Part 1	February 27, 2008	Alliance	December 24, 2008
21	Indomitable, Part 2	March 12, 2008	Alliance	December 24, 2008
22	The Wrath of the Dragon	April 23, 2008	Alliance	December 24, 2008
27	Into the Core	August 27, 2008	Alliance	December 24, 2008
Loyalties			The Hidden Temple	February 25, 2009
23	Loyalties, Part 1	May 7, 2008	The Hidden Temple	February 25, 2009
24	Loyalties, Part 2	May 21, 2008	The Hidden Temple	February 25, 2009
The Hidden Temple			The Hidden Temple	February 25, 2009
25	The Hidden Temple, Part 1	June 18, 2008	The Hidden Temple	February 25, 2009
26	The Hidden Temple, Part 2	July 23, 2008	The Hidden Temple	February 25, 2009
Vector			Vector, Vol. 2	May 20, 2009
28	Vector, Part 9	September 24, 2008	Vector, Vol. 2	May 20, 2009
29	Vector, Part 10	October 29, 2008	Vector, Vol. 2	May 20, 2009
30	Vector, Part 11	November 26, 2008	Vector, Vol. 2	May 20, 2009
31	Vector, Part 12	December 24, 2008	Vector, Vol. 2	May 20, 2009
Fight Another Day			Storms	November 25, 2009
32	Fight Another Day, Part 1	January 28, 2009	Storms	November 25, 2009
33	Fight Another Day, Part 2	February 25, 2009	Storms	November 25, 2009
Storms			Storms	November 25, 2009
34	Storms, Part 1	March 25, 2009	Storms	November 25, 2009
35	Storms, Part 2	April 29, 2009	Storms	November 25, 2009
36	Renegade	May 27, 2009	Storms	November 25, 2009
Tatooine			Tatooine	February 10, 2010
37	Tatooine, Part 1	June 24, 2009	Tatooine	February 10, 2010
38	Tatooine, Part 2	July 29, 2009	Tatooine	February 10, 2010
39	Tatooine, Part 3	August 26, 2009	Tatooine	February 10, 2010
40	Tatooine, Part 4	September 30, 2009	Tatooine	February 10, 2010
41	Rogue's End	October 28, 2009	Tatooine	February 10, 2010
42	Divided Loyalties	November 25, 2009	Monster	July 21, 2010
Monster			Monster	July 21, 2010
43	Monster, Part 1	December 23, 2009	Monster	July 21, 2010
44	Monster, Part 2	January 27, 2010	Monster	July 21, 2010
45	Monster, Part 3	February 24, 2010	Monster	July 21, 2010
46	Monster, Part 4	March 31, 2010	Monster	July 21, 2010
Extremes			Extremes	January 5, 2011
47	The Fate of Dac	April 28, 2010	Extremes	January 5, 2011
48	Extremes, Part 1	May 26, 2010	Extremes	January 5, 2011
49	Extremes, Part 2	June 30, 2010	Extremes	January 5, 2011
50	Extremes, Part 3	August 12, 2010	Extremes	January 5, 2011

== Collected editions ==
The series was collected into trade paperbacks:

- Broken (collects #1–3, 5–7, 144 pages, May 2007, ISBN 1-59307-716-5)
- Shards (collects #4, 8–13, 176 pages, March 2008, ISBN 1-59307-879-X)
- Claws of the Dragon (collects #14–19, 144 pages, June 2008, ISBN 1-59307-946-X)
- Alliance (collects #20–22, 27, 104 pages, December 2008, ISBN 1-59582-223-2)
- The Hidden Temple (collects #23–26, 104 pages, February 2009, ISBN 1-59582-224-0)
- Vector (collects #28–31 & Star Wars: Rebellion #11–12, 144 pages, June 2009, ISBN 1-59582-226-7)
- Storms (collects #32–36, 128 pages, November 2009, ISBN 1-59582-350-6)
- Tatooine (collects #37–41, 104 pages, February 2010, ISBN 1-59582-414-6)
- Monster (collects #42–46, 128 pages, June 2010, ISBN 1-59582-485-5)
- Extremes (collects #47–50, 104 pages, December 2010, ISBN 1-59582-631-9)
- War (collects Star Wars: Legacy: War #1–6, 144 pages, January 2012, ISBN 1-59582-802-8)

== Continuation ==
A second volume to the series, which shares the same name as the original, was announced in 2012. Written by Corinna Bechko and Gabriel Hardman, penciled by Hardman, colored by Rachelle Rosenberg, and published by Dark Horse Comics, it starred Ania Solo, a descendant of Han and Leia Organa Solo. The first issue was planned to be released in March 2013, and continued as a monthly, ongoing series. The series ran for 18 issues, from March 20, 2013, to August 27, 2014.

=== Plot summary ===
The second iteration of Star Wars: Legacy stars Ania Solo, a descendant of Han and Leia. It takes place in the aftermath of Star Wars: Legacy – War, a comic miniseries which was set in the year 138 ABY. As the series begins, Solo is running a junkyard on a backwater Outer Rim planet and living a life far removed from Emperors and royalty. However, the first issue sees her come into possession of a lightsaber and an Imperial communications droid; she discovers that she has been targeted for death, and is launched into an adventure unlike any she has seen before. The backwater world serves as a microcosm for greater galactic affairs, and the story expands outward, showing the reader what is happening in the highest levels of galactic government.

The first issue opened with a "giant lightsaber duel," and it additionally features the Imperial Knight, Yalta Val—an agent of the Galactic Federation Triumvirate—running into trouble in the Outer Rim. The Mon Calamari refugee Sauk, a friend of Solo's who works at an ice mining facility and gets pulled into the adventure by Solo. In the second issue, Solo is pursued both by local police and by an Imperial Knight determined to kill in order to get the lightsaber back. She is aided by formidable friends she has made as a black market salvage dealer. The series also features Sith, and the Princess Marasiah Fel of the previous Star Wars: Legacy. It may eventually include an appearance by Cade, the earlier protagonist.

=== Development ===
In August 2010, the fiftieth and final issue of the comic series Star Wars: Legacy was published by Dark Horse Comics. The six-issue miniseries Star Wars: Legacy – War followed; published from December 2010 to May 2011, it allowed authors John Ostrander and Jan Duursema an opportunity to wrap up the story. On December 3, 2012, Comic Book Resources announced that a new incarnation of Legacy was coming in 2013, written by Corinna Bechko and Gabriel Hardman, and additionally penciled by Hardman. Dark Horse's Vice President of Publishing Randy Stradley soon after indicated that the project had been in the works for a number of months.

Bechko and Hardman indicated via their Twitter feeds how excited they were to be working on the project. They have both been Star Wars fans since the release of the original Star Wars film in 1977, which they cited as a major influence. Dark Horse letterer Michael Heisler praised their work and asserted that they "know what they're doing." Hardman stated that he and Bechko will be "honoring and building on" the work done by Ostrander and Duursema in the original Legacy, but that the series will be accessible to fans unfamiliar with Ostrander and Duursema's work.

The idea of a female protagonist did not originate with Hardman and Bechko, but after it was pitched to them, it played a significant role in drawing them to the project. Bechko has described Ania Solo as a character who "doesn't take a lot of guff," but who is nevertheless not a traditional badass female. Hardman asserts that she has the potential to be "an inspiring but very down-to-Earth human sort of character, as well." Rather than write a genealogy textbook, the two aim to tell a big adventure story that will eventually answer fans' questions about Solo's lineage.

Rachelle Rosenberg was the colorist and Dave Wilkins was the cover artist. The first issue, Prisoner of the Floating World, Part 1, was scheduled for release on March 20, 2013, to continue as a monthly, ongoing series, with the second issue to be released on April 24. Neither Bechko nor Hardman were worried about the implications the release of Star Wars: The Force Awakens would have on the Expanded Universe. Their goal was to tell an exciting story that would work "no matter what", and they were reassured by the likelihood of the film taking place decades before Legacy.

== Legacy ==
George Lucas featured Darth Talon in his unused treatments of the Star Wars sequel trilogy created for Disney. She was to have been the apprentice of Darth Maul, the two serving as the trilogy's primary two villains. According to Lucas, "She was the new Darth Vader and most of the action was with her." In early versions, she would have corrupted the character who became Kylo Ren, and in later versions they were combined into the same character.
