= Dexter Vines =

American comic book artist and inker

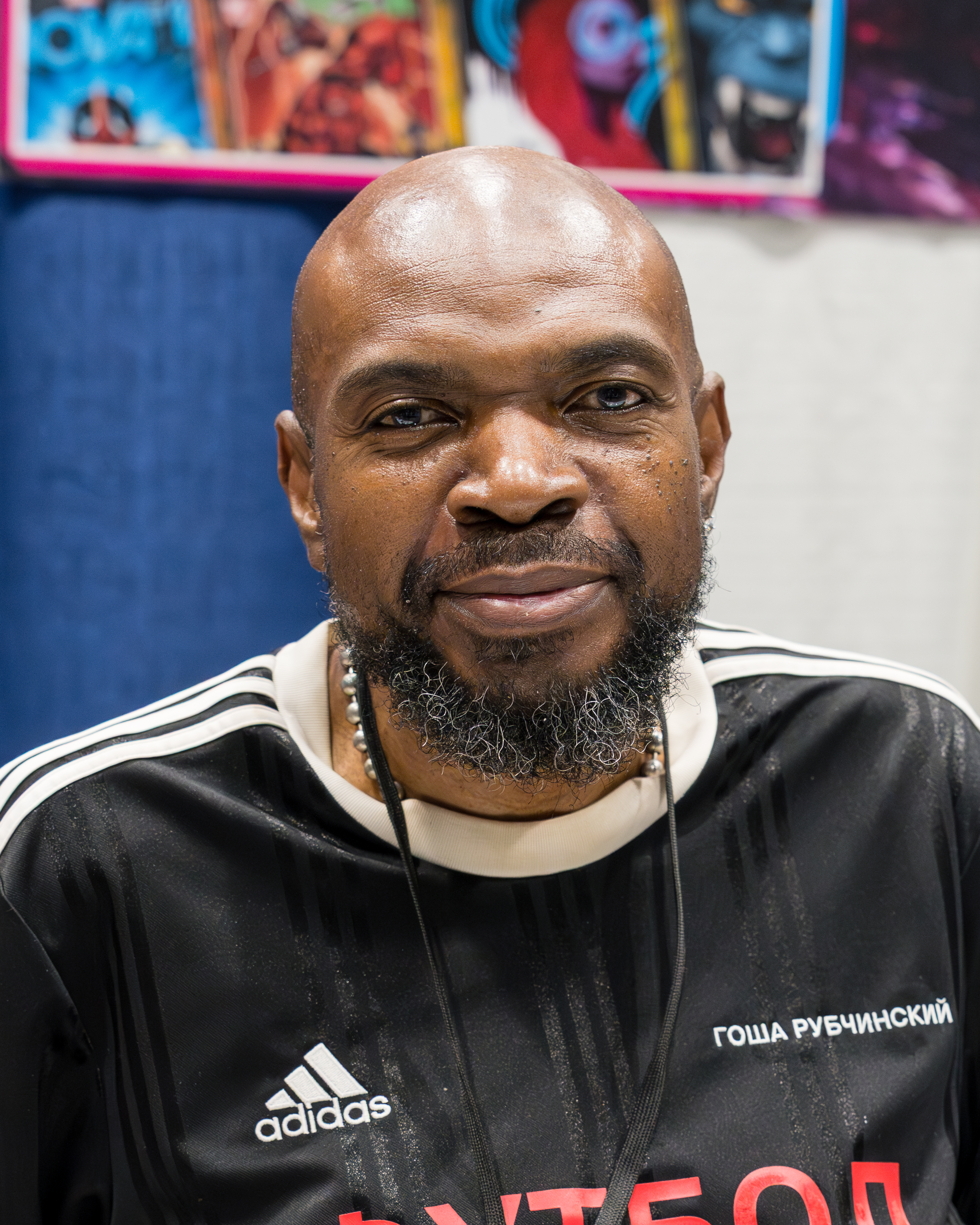
- Vines at GalaxyCon Oklahoma City in 2026
- Born: Atlanta, Georgia
- Area: Inker
- Notable works: Superman/Batman; Civil War; Invincible – The End of All Things
- Awards: Inkwell Award for The "SPAMI" Award (2012)

Dexter Vines is an American comic book artist and inker, known for his collaborations with pencilers such as Steve McNiven and Ed McGuinness, the latter of whom he is credited with as "eDex" team.

== Career ==
Vines has worked on a multitude of titles for both Marvel and DC. Some titles include Marvel's big 2007 summer event Civil War, Tangent Comics Power Girl, Superman/Batman, JLA Classified (all with McGuinness), Wolverine, and the Invincible storyline The End of All Things.

== Awards ==
- 2007 Will Eisner Comic Industry Awards - Nominee - Best Penciller/Inker or Penciller/Inker Team: (Civil War (Marvel) - with Steve McNiven)
- 2012, Vines received the 2012 Inkwell Award for Favorite Small Press And Mainstream-Independent (S.P.A.M.I.) ink work over another pencil artist.
