= Dan Parsons =

American comic book artist

Dan Parsons is an American comic book artist and illustrator. He is best known for his work on Star Wars and Game of Thrones.

== Career ==
Dan Parsons started out in comics self-publishing his creator-owned series Harpy, which became part of the late-1990s indy comics "bad girl" movement. He wrote and penciled Harpy as an ongoing comic book series, and, with its increasing visibility, Parsons was hired to pencil and ink another popular "bad girl" series called Razor (London Night Studios). Parsons illustrated the story "Luna" for Avatar Press's Threshold #30, which was written by David Quinn (Faust). Parsons provided wash tones for Warren Ellis's Strange Kiss, as well as the sequel, Stranger Kisses. He also penciled, inked, and did cover work for the classic Battlestar Galactica comic book series (Millennium Press); All this while still working full time as a scientific researcher at Johns Hopkins Bayview Medical Center.

Parsons went on to release another creator-owned series: Savage Planet, which he describes as a tribute to the EC Comics of the 1950s, honoring the work of Frank Frazetta and Al Williamson. It was at SDCC 2002, promoting the release of Savage Planet, that Parsons met Jan Duursema, the ongoing penciller of Star Wars. Recognizing Parsons’ similarity of inking style with Williamson, (the original classic Star Wars cartoonist); Duursema recommended Parsons to the Star Wars team over at Dark Horse Comics. He was hired immediately, and worked at Dark Horse as the primary inker on a wide range of Star Wars titles, including Star Wars, Legacy, Dawn of the Jedi, Clone Wars, Republic, Rebel Heist and many more. He continued inking Star Wars comic book titles until the end of the Dark Horse era in 2014, (when the Disney Corporation purchased the Star Wars franchise). Parsons would win an Inkwell Award in 2010 and again in 2015, for his ink work on the Star Wars comics. Other inking credits include DC Comics Nightwing Convergence and other Dark Horse Comics titles: (Ghost, King Kong).

Parsons has also done some work for Hollywood. In 2011, he did a series of elaborate pencil drawings for the season one Blu-ray/DVD for HBO's Game of Thrones. His renditions of Aegon the Conqueror and other characters have become the definitive visual representations of George R.R. Martin's literary creations. More recently he illustrated an Avatar: the Last Airbender book for Nickelodeon/Insight Editions and a graphic novel adaptation of Ayn Rand’s 1937 sci-fi classic, Anthem. In addition to these projects, Parsons worked on numerous trading cards for the Topps Company from 2002 to present. Parsons is currently penciling and wash-painting a new Sherlock Holmes five-issue miniseries (Brothers of Baker Street), and inking James Cameron’s new six-issue Avatar miniseries (Tsu’tey’s Path).

== Awards ==
He is a double recipient (2010 and 2015) of the Inkwell Award for his work on Star Wars comics from Dark Horse Comics. In 2014, he received a Ghastly Award for excellence in horror comics. In September 2018, Parsons was named Inkwell Awards Special Ambassador.
