= The Kubert School =

Private technical school for comics art in Dover, New Jersey, US

Coordinates: 40.8873°N 74.5526°W

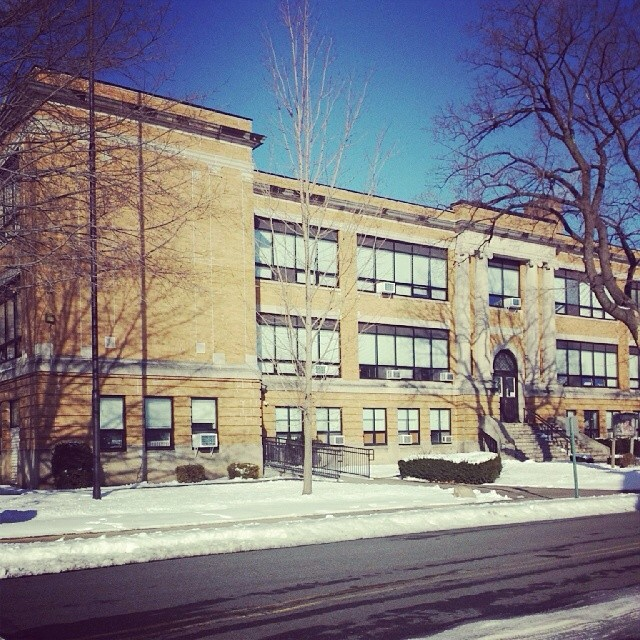
- Type: Private for-profit art school
- Established: 1976
- Founder: Joe Kubert
- President: Anthony Marques
- Faculty: 10–15 per school year
- Undergraduates: 150
- Location: Madison, New Jersey, United States
- Campus: Urban
- Mascot: Tor
- Website: kubertschool.edu

The Joe Kubert School of Cartoon and Graphic Art, Inc., commonly known as The Kubert School or Joe Kubert School, is a private for-profit art school focused on cartooning and graphic art located in Madison, New Jersey. It teaches the principles of sequential art and the particular craft of the comics industry as well as commercial illustration. The school's instructors are professional writers, artists, colorists, and letterers working in the comic book and commercial art field, many of whom are alumni.

== History ==
The Joe Kubert School of Cartoon and Graphic Art was founded in September 1976 by cartoonist Joe Kubert and his wife Muriel in the old Baker mansion at 45 Lehigh Street in Dover; Its first graduating class of 1978 included Stephen R. Bissette, Thomas Yeates, and Rick Veitch.

By 1980, the school offered a three-year program in Cartoon Illustration, Graphic Arts, and Cinematic Animation. Approved by the New Jersey Department of Education, the Kubert School advertised itself to veterans and "non-resident alien" students.

In the 1980s, the school moved into Dover's former high school at 37 Myrtle Avenue. Founder and instructor Joe Kubert kept his own studio in the school, later joined by his sons Adam and Andy, who are also comic book professionals and who taught at the school.

Anthony Marques, a graduate of the school and a comics illustrator, editor and comics shop owner, became the president after acquiring the school in the fall of 2019.

Geoff Johns taught two master classes at the school in 2020, with Jason Fabok joining him for one of the classes. At one stage, Johns had considered attending the school.

In May of 2025, the school relocated to a new location at 27 Main Street in Madison, New Jersey.

== Campus and student body ==
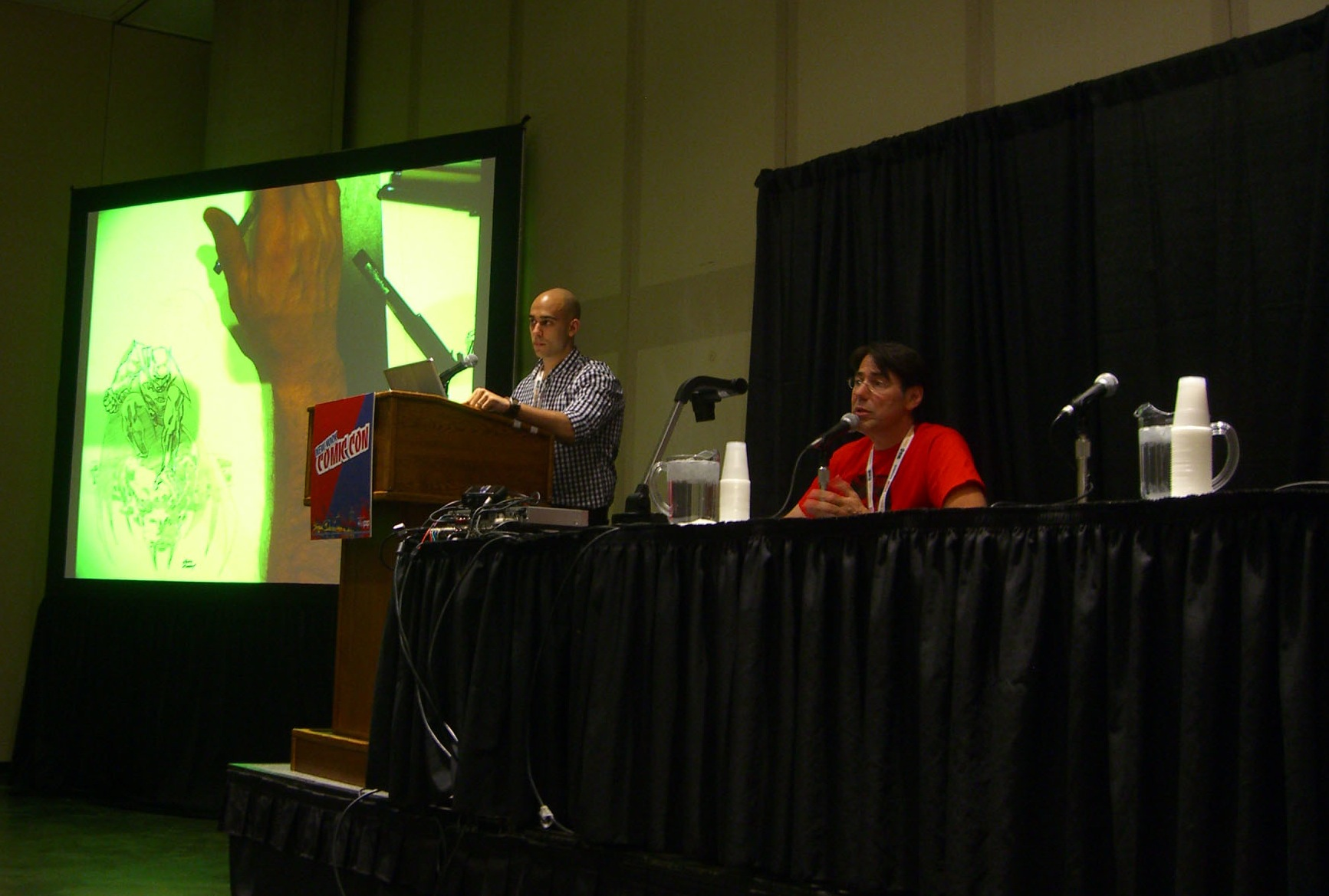
Anthony Marques and Adam Kubert at a Kubert School presentation at the 2012 New York Comic Con

The school is located in Madison, New Jersey a small suburban community in Morris County. It is 20 miles west of New York City with a New Jersey Transit train station offering access to Manhattan. The school offers in-person and remote learning to a relatively small student body of between 50 and 80 students.

== Alumni ==
The school's alumni work in a wide variety of jobs in the fields of animation, comic books, commercial art and illustration. Noteworthy alumni include: Stephen R. Bissette, Rick Veitch, Jan Duursema, John Totleben, Tom Mandrake, Thomas Yeates, Timothy Truman, Ron Randall, Dan Parent, Amanda Conner, Lee Weeks, Eric Shanower, Andy Price, Bjørn Ousland, Ed Piskor, Alec Stevens, Steve Lieber, Scott Kolins, Brandon Vietti, Shane Davis, Damion Scott, Kevin Altieri, Keith Champagne, Bart Sears, Sergio Cariello, Matt Hollingsworth and Cliff Rathburn as well as many other professional comic book pencilers and inkers.
