= Joe Sinnott =

American comic book artist (1926–2020)

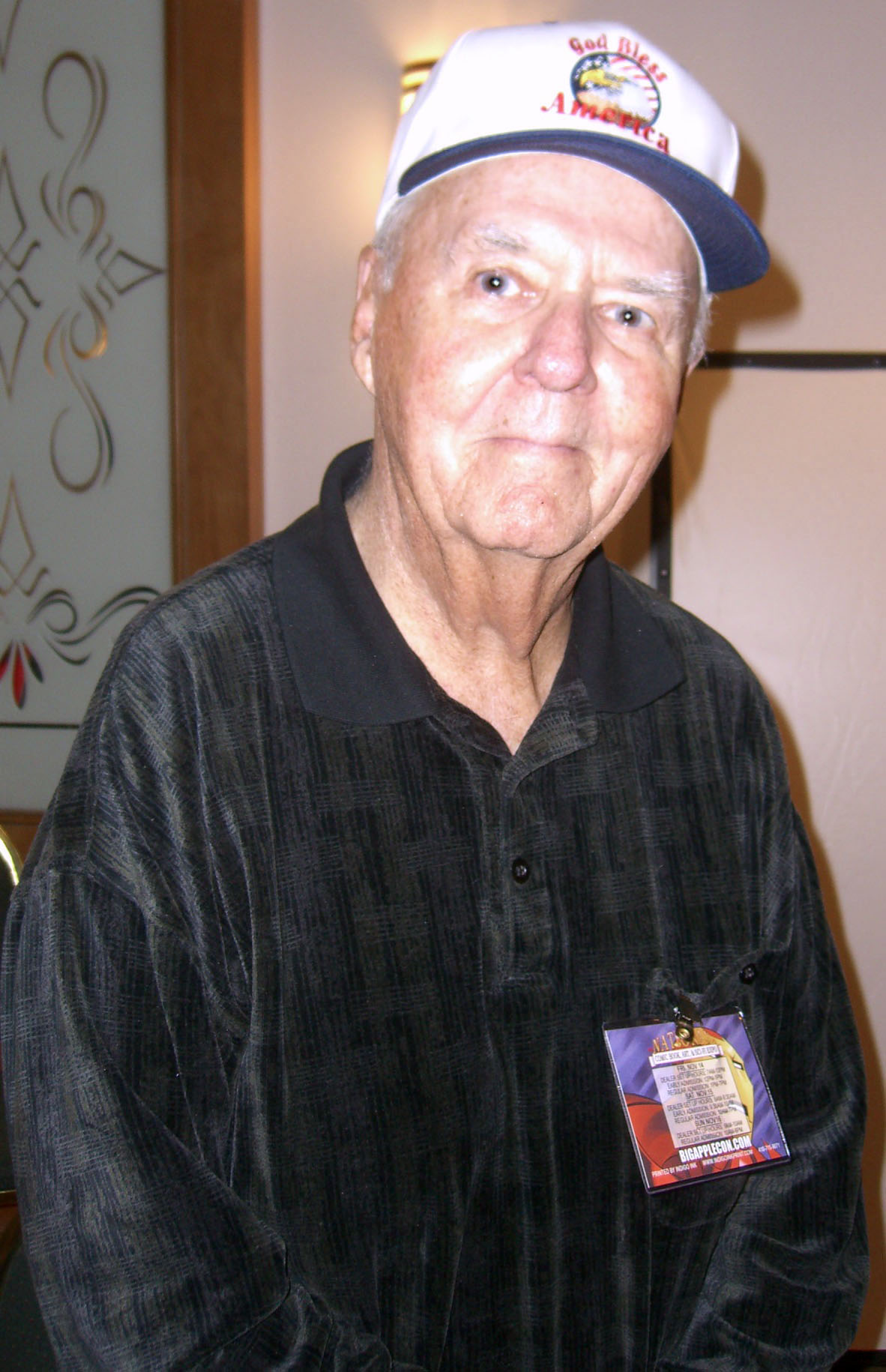
- Sinnott at the 2008 Big Apple Con
- Born: Joseph Leonard Sinnott; October 16, 1926 Saugerties, New York, U.S.
- Died: June 25, 2020 (aged 93) Saugerties, New York, U.S.
- Area: Inker
- Notable works: Fantastic Four; The Defenders; The Avengers; Thor
- Awards: Alley Award, 1967, 1968; Inkpot Award, 2005; Will Eisner Hall of Fame, 2013; Inkwell Awards Hall of Fame, 2008; Inkwell Awards Favorite Inker (Retro), 2008
- Spouse: Betty Kirlauski (m. 1950; died 2006)

Joseph Leonard Sinnott (/ˈsɪnət/; October 16, 1926 – June 25, 2020) was an American comic book artist. Working primarily as an inker, Sinnott is best known for his long stint on Marvel Comics' Fantastic Four, from 1965 to 1981 (and briefly in the late 1980s), initially over the pencils of Jack Kirby. During his 60 years as a Marvel freelance artist and then remote worker salaried artist, Sinnott inked virtually every major title, with notable runs on The Avengers, The Defenders, and Thor.

In the mid-2000s, Stan Lee cited Sinnott as the company's most in-demand inker, saying jocularly, "[P]encilers used to hurl all sorts of dire threats at me if I didn't make certain that Joe, and only Joe, inked their pages. I knew I couldn't satisfy everyone and I had to save the very most important strips for [him]. To most pencilers, having Joe Sinnott ink their artwork was tantamount to grabbing the brass ring." Sinnott's art appeared on two US Postal Service commemorative stamps in 2007, and he continued to ink The Amazing Spider-Man Sunday comic strip until his retirement in 2019.

== Early life and career ==
Joseph Leonard Sinnott was born October 16, 1926, in Saugerties, New York. He was one of seven children born to Edward and Catherine McGraw Sinnott; his siblings were Edward and five who predeceased him: Ann / Anne, Frank, John a.k.a. Jack, Leonard and Richard. He grew up in a boarding house that catered primarily to schoolteachers, some of whom inspired in the young Sinnott a love of drawing. His childhood comics influences include the comic strip Terry and the Pirates and the comic book characters Batman, Congo Bill, Hawkman and Zatara. Sinnott attended the schools St. Mary of the Snow and Saugerties High School.

Following the death in action of his brother Jack, a member of the United States Army's Third Division, in 1944, Sinnott acceded to his mother's wishes not to be drafted into the Army himself, and he enlisted in the U.S. Navy in the autumn of that year. After serving with the Seabees in Okinawa during World War II, driving a munitions truck, he was discharged in May 1946 and awarded the Asiatic–Pacific Campaign Medal, the World War II Victory Medal, and the Navy Occupation Service Medal. After working three years in his father's cement-manufacturing plant, he was accepted into the Cartoonists and Illustrators School (later the School of Visual Arts) in New York City in March 1949, attending on the GI Bill.

Sinnott's first solo professional art job was the backup feature "Trudi" in the St. John Publications humor comic Mopsy #12 (Sept. 1950).

Cartoonists and Illustrators School instructor Tom Gill asked Sinnott to be his assistant on Gill's freelance comics work. With classmate Norman Steinberg, Sinnott spent nine months drawing backgrounds and incidentals on, initially, Gill's Western-movie tie-in comics for Dell Comics. Sinnott recalled in 1992 "taking the Long Island Rail Road every weekend and working all day Saturday and Sunday." He said in 2003, "Tom was paying us very well. I was still attending school and worked for Tom at nights and [on] weekends," with night work added after he tired of commuting to Long Island and "began working [in] my room on 75th Street for $7 a week."

Sinnott in 1992 recalled his earliest work for Gill being the Western comic Red Warrior and later including Kent Blake of the Secret Service, both for Atlas Comics, a predecessor of Marvel Comics. "Tom would do all of the heads. We'd do everything else. We'd do the backgrounds and the figures, but since they were Tom's accounts, he'd do the heads so it looked like his work. I did this for about nine months. It was great learning," he said, adding, "I can never have enough good to say about Tom Gill. He gave me my start."

=== Timely/Atlas ===
Branching out professionally, in 1951 Sinnott met with editor Stan Lee at Marvel Comics' 1950s forerunner Atlas Comics, having reasoned, he recalled, "'Gee, Stan can't turn me down because he's accepting all the work we bring in'. So I went over to see Stan and he gave me a script right away...." Due to creator credits not generally being given at the time, sources differ on Sinnott's first non-Gill Atlas assignment. One standard source gives two stories published the same month: the four-page Western filler "The Man Who Wouldn't Die" in Apache Kid #8 (Sept. 1951), and the two-page "Under the Red Flag" in Kent Blake of the Secret Service #3 (Sept. 1951).

Regardless, Sinnott would go on to draw a multitude of stories in many genres for the company throughout the decade: horror, science-fiction and supernatural-fantasy stories for Adventures into Terror, Astonishing, Marvel Tales, Menace, Journey into Mystery, Strange Tales, Uncanny Tales and others; war-comics stories for Battle, Battle Action, Battlefield, Battlefront, Combat, Navy Combat and others, including historical war stories in Man Comics; biblical stories in Bible Tales for Young Folk; Westerns in Frontier Western, Gunsmoke Western, Two Gun Western, Western Outlaws, Wild Western and others, co-creating with unknown writers the titular heroes of The Kid from Texas and Arrowhead, the latter starring a Native American warrior; and the occasional crime story (Caught ) and romance tale (Secret Story Romances).

He said in 2003, "I used to go up [to the office, at the Empire State Building] and sit in a little reading room with four or five other artists. It got so that every week I went up, the same guys would be in the room. Bob Powell, Gene Colan, people like that. I got to talking to them. Syd Shores was [freelancing] there, too." The pattern, Sinnott recalled, was for assistant art director Bob Brown to call each in turn to meet with Lee for "maybe ten or fifteen minutes.... There'd be a stack of scripts on the left side of his desk, typed on legal yellow paper. He'd take one off the top and didn't know what he'd be handing you. It could be a war story or a Western or anything. You took it home and were expected to do a professional job on it".

Sinnott lived in New York City for three years while attending art school, living near Broadway and West 74th Street on Manhattan's Upper West Side, and then returned to his hometown of Saugerties, New York, where he spent his life.

During a 1957 economic retrenchment when Atlas let go of most of its staff and freelancers, Sinnott found other work in the six months before the company called him back. Like other freelancers there, he had taken sporadic cuts in his page-rate even before the company implosion. "I was up to $46 a page for pencils and inks. and that was a good rate in 1956, when the decline started. I was down to $21 a page when Atlas stopped hiring me. ... Stan called me and said, 'Joe, Martin Goodman told me to suspend operations because I have all this artwork in-house and have to use it up before I can hire you again.' It turned out to be six months, in my case. He may have called back some of the other artists later, but that's what happened with me".

He began doing such commercial art as billboards and record covers, ghosting for some DC Comics artists, and a job for Classics Illustrated comics. Former EC Comics artist Jack Kamen by this time was the art director of Harwyn Publishing's 12-volume, 1958 Harwyn Picture Encyclopedia for children, and had Sinnott join a roster of contributors that included such notable EC artists as Reed Crandall, Bill Elder, George Evans, Angelo Torres and Wally Wood. Sinnott also began a long association with publisher George Pflaum's Treasure Chest, a Catholic-oriented comic book distributed in parochial schools. With Bob Wischmeyer, a Treasure Chest writer-editor, Sinnott collaborated on an unsold college-athlete comic strip Johnny Hawk, All American.

== Silver Age of Comic Books ==
Fantastic Four #72 (March 1968), featuring the Watcher (background) and the Silver Surfer is one of many collaborations between penciller Jack Kirby and Sinnott as inker.

During the late 1950s and 1960s period historians and collectors call the Silver Age of Comic Books, Sinnott continued doing occasional pencil-and-ink stories for Atlas Comics as it transitioned into the nascent Marvel Comics, contributing to such "pre-superhero Marvel" titles as Strange Tales, Strange Worlds, Tales to Astonish, Tales of Suspense and World of Fantasy. He also began a stint with the low-budget Charlton Comics, teamed as penciler with inker Vince Colletta on several romance-comics stories in series including First Kiss, Just Married, Romantic Secrets, Sweethearts and Teen-Age Love that he would do through 1963.

Sinnott's first collaboration with Jack Kirby, one of comics' most historically groundbreaking and influential creators and the penciler with whom he is most often identified, came with the war-comics story "Doom Under the Deep" in Atlas' Battle #69 (April 1960). After a supernatural Kirby story in Journey into Mystery, #58 (May 1960), he inked Kirby's twice-reprinted giant-monster story "I Was Trapped By Titano the Monster That Time Forgot" in Tales to Astonish #10 (July 1960), although not the cover featuring that lead story. Sinnott in 1992 believed his first Kirby collaboration was a Western story titled "Outlaw Man from Fargo", but nothing approximating that appears in standard databases.

Sinnott did one additional Kirby pre-superhero Marvel story, "I Was a Decoy for Pildorr: The Plunderer from Outer Space", in Strange Tales #94 (March 1962), before inking his first Marvel superhero comic: both the cover and the interior of penciler Kirby's The Fantastic Four #5 (July 1962), the issue introducing the long-running supervillain Dr. Doom. Sinnott also inked a few panels of the following issue's second page, the remainder inked by another Kirby regular, Dick Ayers.

Sinnott explained his not remaining on The Fantastic Four after his single early issue:

Before Stan called me to ink Jack on Fantastic Four #5, I never knew the Fantastic Four existed. I lived up here in ... the Catskill Mountains, and I never went down to the city at that time. ... Everything was done by mail and I didn't know what books were coming out, even. ... Stan called me up and said, "Joe, I've got a book here by Jack Kirby and I'd like you to ink it, if you could. I can't find anybody to ink it." ... [When the pencil art arrived,] I was dumbfounded by the great art and the characters. ... I had a ball inking it. I remember when I mailed it back, Stan called me. He said, "Joe, we liked it so much, I'm going to send you #6." So he [did], but I had committed myself [to] another account at [publisher George A. Pflaum's Catholic comic book] Treasure Chest ... and this was a 65-page story I was going to have to do on one of the Popes ["The Story Of Pope John XXIII, Who Won Our Hearts", in vol. 18, #1–9 (Sept. 13, 1962 – Jan. 3, 1963)]. I had committed myself to it, so when I had started #6, I think I just did a panel or two. I had to send it back to Stan.

Sinnott had by then inked the introduction of the Norse god superhero Thor, in Journey into Mystery #83 (Aug. 1962). He also inked the following issue's Kirby cover, and, following his papal project, he both penciled and inked five subsequent Thor stories, in issues #91–92, 94–96 (April–Sept. 1963).

Aside from these sporadic works, however, Sinnott was primarily inking for Charlton during this period, with occasional jobs for American Comics Group, Treasure Chest, and Dell Comics, for which he variously penciled and fully drew film and TV adaptations, and penciled the one-shot biographical comic The Beatles #1 (Nov. 1964). But then, in 1965, he returned to Marvel to work virtually exclusively, beginning with his inking the cover and the story, "Where Walks the Juggernaut", of The X-Men #13 (Sept. 1965).

After this, Sinnott began his long and celebrated stint on a Marvel flagship title, Fantastic Four, inking Kirby on "The Gentleman's Name Is Gorgon! or What a Way to Spend a Honeymoon!" in issue #44 (Nov. 1965). He remained on the series through Kirby's departure after issue #102 (Sept. 1970)—having contributed visually to the introductions of Lee/Kirby's Galactus, the Silver Surfer, the Black Panther, the Inhumans, Adam Warlock and other characters—and continued on through 1981, missing an issue here and there or simply inking the cover. He made a brief return in the late 1980s. His post-Kirby pencilers included John Romita, John Buscema, Bill Sienkiewicz, Rich Buckler, and George Pérez.

A comics historian assessed the mid-1960s Kirby–Sinnott art collaboration:

In an uncanny stroke of luck and perfect timing, just when Kirby gained the time to improve his artwork, Joe Sinnott became the FF's regular inker. Sinnott was a master craftsman, fiercely proud of the effort and meticulous detail he put into his work. ... That slick, stylized layer of India ink that Sinnott painted over Kirby's pencils finished Jack's work in a way that no other inker ever would. Comic fans had never witnessed art this strange and powerful in its scope and strength.

During the 1960s Silver Age, Sinnott also inked several Kirby Captain America stories and his "The Inhumans" backup feature in Thor; two Jim Steranko stories each of superspy Nick Fury and superhero Captain America; and Buscema's 38-page origin story in The Silver Surfer #1 (Aug. 1968), among other Marvel work.

Sinnott recalled in 2006,

Down through the years, all through the '60s, [rival] DC [Comics] always called me and ask me if I'd come over and work for them, and I'd tell them that [Marvel editor] Stan [Lee] would give me all the work I wanted. Stan had always told me, "Joe, whatever DC offer you, we'll continue to pay you more," no matter what the rates were. In those days all the artists didn't get the same pay, we all got different rates. And I enjoyed the characters that we were working on.

== Later career ==
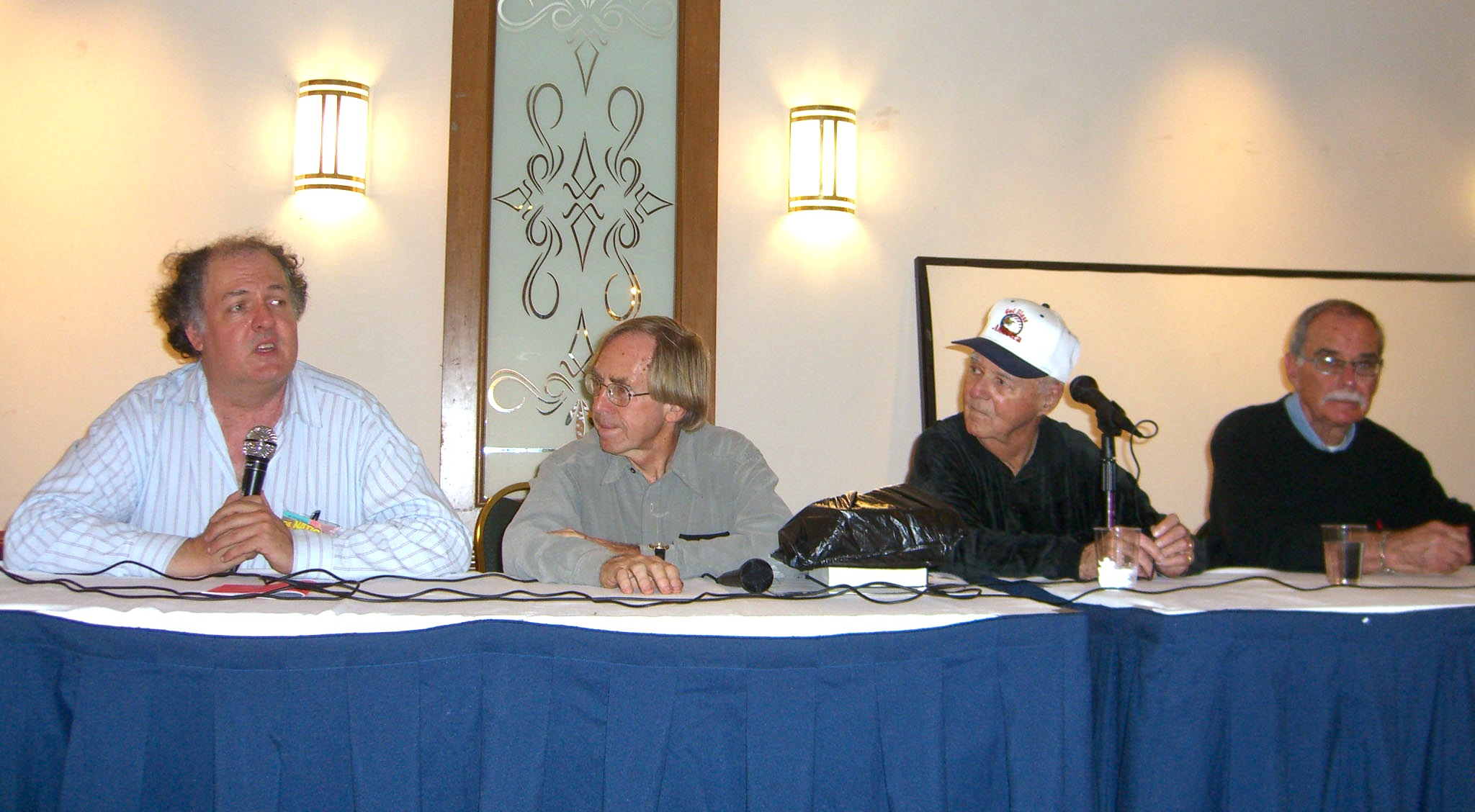
Sinnott, third from left, on a 2008 panel on Jack Kirby. With him from left to right are Mark Evanier, Roy Thomas and Stan Goldberg.

During his years as a Marvel freelancer, and then salaried artist working from home, Sinnott inked virtually every major title, with notable runs on The Avengers, The Defenders and Thor.

Sinnott retired from comic books in 1992 to concentrate on inking The Amazing Spider-Man Sunday strip, and to do recreations of comics covers and commissioned artwork. He continued to contribute sporadically to Marvel, and for Captain America vol. 6, #1 (cover-dated Sept. 2011), he inked John Romita Sr. on one of six variant covers done for this premiere issue.

Sinnott retired from the Amazing Spider-Man strip in March 2019, at age 92.

== Personal life ==
In August 1950, during a two-week school vacation from the Cartoonists and Illustrators School (later the School of Visual Arts) in New York City, Sinnott wed Elizabeth "Betty" Kirlauski (March 7, 1932 – November 1, 2006), to whom he remained married for 56 years until her death. The couple had four children: sons Joseph Jr. and Mark, and daughters Kathleen and Linda, the last of whom predeceased Sinnott.

He died on June 25, 2020, age 93. His grandson Dorian specified, "He passed away this morning, June 25th, at 8:40 am at the age of 93. He enjoyed life and was drawing up until the end."

== Awards and recognition ==
- 1995 Inkpot Award
- 2008 Inkwell Hall of Fame Award
- 2008 Inkwell Award for Favorite Inker (Retro; tied with Terry Austin)
- 2008 Inkwell Awards Special Ambassador (2008–present)
- 2013 Will Eisner Hall of Fame Award.

He is the namesake of the Inkwell Award "Joe Sinnott Hall of Fame Award", or commonly called the Joe Sinnott Award.

== Legacy ==
Two Jack Kirby–Joe Sinnott images are among those on the "Marvel Super Heroes" set of commemorative stamps issued by the U.S. Postal Service on July 27, 2007: the Thing and the Silver Surfer.

Sinnott is named the No. 1 inker of American comics by historians at the Chicago, Illinois, retailer Atlas Comics, on its list of the medium's top 20.
