= Tales of the Jedi (comics) =

Comic book series, 1993 to 1998

Dave Dorman's cover art for the first issue of Tales of the Jedi. Later issues in the initial story arc were subtitled Knights of the Old Republic.

Star Wars: Tales of the Jedi is a series of comic books published by Dark Horse Comics between 1993 and 1998. They are part of the fictional Star Wars expanded universe, and cover the Great Sith War and the Great Hyperspace War. The series represented the earliest chronological Star Wars stories until the publication of the Dawn of the Jedi series of comics and novels.

The first books released covered the Great Sith War (3,996 BBY, or Before the Battle of Yavin). The latter were prequels that covered the Great Hyperspace War, which happened a thousand years earlier.

== Summary ==
The Great Hyperspace War was instigated when two Republic hyperspace explorers accidentally crash-landed on the Sith graveyard planet Korriban during the funeral procession of Marka Ragnos. His successor, Naga Sadow, provoked war with the Republic, and installed himself as the leader of the Sith Empire. He fought not only the Republic, but the forces of his chief rival, Ludo Kressh, and was forced to destroy his own fleet to cover his escape. Sadow landed on Yavin IV and constructed vast temples with the labor of his Massassi warriors.

Six hundred years later, fallen Jedi Freedon Nadd arrived on Yavin IV, and learned Sith sorcery from the spirit of Naga Sadow. He took his knowledge and the treasures of Sadow to the planet Onderon, where he used his acquired gifts to install himself as king. His spirit continued to advise his descendants.

Another Jedi, Ulic Qel-Droma, was sent to Onderon to mediate a conflict, where he met the spirit of Freedon Nadd, who told him he would become a Sith Lord. The prophecy came true when the Krath, a secret dark side society, attacked the Republic and injured Ulic with alchemically treated shrapnel, and then injected him with dark side poisons that would ensure his fall.

Exar Kun left his master, Vodo-Siosk Baas, because his master would not let him learn about the dark side. He went to Onderon, where he learned of Freedon Nadd's tomb. Nadd's spirit told him to go to Korriban, where Nadd tricked him into accepting the dark side. They went to Yavin IV, where Nadd gave him a choice: surrender to the dark side, or die. Kun chose life. After learning about the dark side from Nadd, Kun destroyed him with a dark side amulet.

Exar Kun and Ulic Qel-Droma met on Cinnagar, and their battle was interrupted by the spirit of Marka Ragnos, who declared Kun the Dark Lord of the Sith, and Qel-Droma his apprentice. Together, they waged war on the Republic, stealing Jedi students from Ossus and subverting them to the dark side. Qel-Droma defeated Lord Mandalore, earning the services of the Mandalorian warriors. Qel-Droma attacked Coruscant, but was captured. Kun led a rescue attempt, and killed his former master in the process. Soon thereafter, the Sith Lords caused the Cron Cluster to go supernova, destroying countless Jedi artifacts on nearby Ossus.

Before Ossus was destroyed, Ulic's brother Cay tried to convince him to return to the light. Ulic cut him down in a lightsaber duel and, horrified by what he had done, surrendered himself to his former lover, Nomi Sunrider, when she forever cut off his connection to the Force. Broken, Ulic surrendered to the Republic, and led them to Yavin IV, where Exar Kun committed a ritual that sapped the life from every Massassi on the planet to separate his spirit from his body and bind it to his temple.

The Cleansing of the Nine Houses are the events during the aftermath of the Great Sith War, when, after the repentance of Ulic Qel-Droma, and the death/ascension of Exar Kun, the Old Republic hunted down and bloodily purged the remnants of the Sith Brotherhood.

The video game Knights of the Old Republic, takes place forty years after the end of the Sith War.

== Comic series ==
=== Knights of the Old Republic ===
Knights of the Old Republic (1993–94) is a five-part series by Tom Veitch, Chris Gossett, Janine Johnston, and David Roach. It is set between 4,000 and 3,999 years before the Battle of Yavin.

=== The Freedon Nadd Uprising ===
The Freedon Nadd Uprising (1994) is a two-part story arc by Tom Veitch, Tony Akins, and Dennis Rodier, set during the same era as the previous arc.

While attempting to move the sarcophagi of Freedon Nadd and Queen Amanoa to the moon of Dxun, Jedi Knights Arca Jeth, Ulic Qel-Droma, Cay Qel-Droma, Tott Doneeta and Oss Wilum are attacked by several hundred Naddists, led by Warb Null, invading Iziz from underground. While distracting the Iziz forces, a group of Naddists are able to snatch the sarcophagi and take it back with them underground. Master Arca, Ulic and Queen Galia consult Galia's ailing father, King Ommin, for assistance. However, they are confronted by the spirit of Freedon Nadd, and Ommin betrays his seemingly immobile state by attacking Master Arca, knocking him unconscious. Warb Null comes in and attacks Ulic, but is soon bested and killed by the young Jedi. Unfortunately, this gives Ommin the time he needs to kidnap Master Arca.

Meanwhile, on Ossus, Nomi Sunrider, Dace Diath, Shoaneb Culu, Kith Kark and Qrrrl Toq are chosen to defend Iziz in the forthcoming Second Battle of Onderon. On Coruscant, heirs to the Empress Teta system royalty and members of the Dark Side cult the Krath, Satal and Aleema Keto, enter the Galactic Museum and find a fascinating Sith book. Satal steals it while the curator is not looking, and, after seeing a news report on the Sith practitioners still active in Iziz, the Ketos fly to Onderon to find said practitioners and discover the secrets of their new book.

Satal and Aleema Keto arrive on Onderon to find a massive battle taking place. Their ship, The Krath Enchanter, crashes, but the young Ketos are able to escape with their lives. Meanwhile, the Jedi task force from Ossus, led by Nomi Sunrider, battles their way through Sith war droids and Naddists. Kith Kark is killed in the assault, as the rest of the Jedi infiltrate the royal palace, meeting up with Ulic and Cay Qel-Droma, Tott Doneeta and Oss Wilum. Meanwhile, the Ketos are greeted by King Ommin, hoping to unlock the mysteries of their stolen Sith tome. Ommin gives Satal an amulet, with which he can read the book perfectly, as Arca Jeth is hung on the wall, suffering under deadly Sith magic. Out in the battlefield, Cay Qel-Droma has his prosthetic arm cut off by a war droid, which he quickly dispatches with his organic arm.

The group of seven Jedi arrive at King Ommin's stronghold, and Ulic slices off the former King's armature, sending him tumbling to the ground limply. Victorious, the forces of Iziz soon transport the sarcophagi of Freedon Nadd, Queen Amanoa and now King Ommin to Dxun, to forever be laid to rest.

=== Dark Lords of the Sith ===
Dark Lords of the Sith (1994–95) is a six-part story arc by Kevin J. Anderson, Tom Veitch, Chris Gossett, and Art Wetherell. It is set two years after the previous arcs, continues the tale of Ulic Qel-Droma, and introduces the character of Exar Kun, a dark lord of the Sith. The story details how the Jedi, led by Ulic Qel-Droma and Nomi Sunrider attempt to free the Empress Teta System from the tyrannical control of evil Dark Side adepts Satal and Aleema. It also details Exar Kun's fall to the Dark Side at the seduction of the spirit of Freedon Nadd, becoming Dark Lord of the Sith with Ulic as his apprentice.

=== The Sith War ===
The Sith War (1995–96) is a six-part comic by Kevin J. Anderson, set a year after the previous arc. It continues the story of Ulic Qel-Droma and Exar Kun. The story also shows how the current Mandalore shows great loyalty to Ulic.

Mandalore the Indomitable, wage war on the Teta system. Mandalore challenges Ulic Qel-Droma to a duel, which Ulic accepts on the terms that if he wins, he shall receive control of the Mandalorian warriors. Ulic wins, and recruits Mandalore and his army to fight for the Sith. They begin to plan a devastating attack on Coruscant.

=== Prequels ===
==== The Golden Age of the Sith ====
The Golden Age of the Sith (1996–97) a six-part arc by Kevin J. Anderson, Chris Gossett, and Dario Carrasco Jr., set a millennium before the original comic.

Odan-Urr is studying Jedi history when his master, Ooroo, sends him to the Koros system to help Empress Teta fight the Unification Wars and unite the seven worlds located in the system. Once he has arrived on Cinnagar he helps to conquer the last planet, Kirrek, with Battle Meditation, a technique he has learned about in his studies. But even with this technique he cannot prevent casualties from occurring; among them are two blockade runners, Hok and Timar Daragon. With their parents dead, Gav and Jori Daragon get their ship, Starbreaker 12, back from Aarrba the Hutt who was holding it back as collateral.

With the ship Gav and Jori have become hyperspace explorers, but their latest route proves less than successful; they just barely make it through. They make it back to Cinnegar, but their ship is heavily damaged. Aarrba the Hutt agrees to make the repairs, but he won't give their ship back until they have paid all the bills.

Ssk Kahorr sends one of his drone ships along the route discovered by Gav and Jori, but it is destroyed when it passes too close to Primus Goluud, a red supergiant. Ssk Kahorr isn't pleased with this and sends two bounty hunters after the two hyperspace explorers. But they are saved by two Jedi, Odan-Urr and Memit Nadill. They advise them to leave the Koros system, because it is not safe for them. Gav and Jori steal back the Starbreaker 12 and desperately flee the system with random hyperspace coordinates.

On Korriban, on the far side of the galaxy, a funeral procession is held for Marka Ragnos, a Dark Lord of the Sith. The procession is led by Sith Lord Ludo Kressh. Just when the tomb is about to be closed, however, Kressh's nemesis, Naga Sadow, arrives. A fight about who should be the next Dark Lord ensues between the two rivals, but they are stopped by the ghost of Ragnos himself, who warns them of what is to come. Meanwhile, back in the Koros system, Odan-Urr has a premonition about the evil Jedi banished centuries ago. He tells Empress Teta about his dreams, and she promises that she will raise the matter on Coruscant. Back on Korriban, the Starbreaker 12 arrives and Gav and Jori are captured by the Sith forces.

On Ziost, the Sith Lords discuss what to do with the prisoners. After a long debate it is decided to have Gav and Jori killed. But Naga Sadow, seeing in these prisoners a chance to expand the Sith Empire, does not give up this easily. He sends one of his Massassi warriors to retrieve the weapons on their ship. He hatches a plan to capture the prisoners for himself and use them to regain contact with the Republic.

Together with his most loyal Massassi warriors, he frees the Daragons. But to keep his identity hidden from the other Sith Lords, he has to kill everyone in his path, including his old mentor Simus. He leaves a Republic blaster behind, to let others think it was an attack by the Republic. Gav and Jori are sent to his stronghold on Khar Shian and Sadow returns to Ziost where an urgent meeting is held between the Sith Lords. The other Sith Lords are indecisive about what to do and in the confusion he claims to be named the new Dark Lord of the Sith. The other Sith Lords, except Ludo Kressh and his supporters, agree. Sadow immediately calls upon the others to prepare their ships and warriors so they can attack the Republic first. Empress Teta and her two Jedi advisors have arrived at Coruscant, where she addresses the Senate about Odan-Urr's premonition, but the people listening do not believe her. Even without the help of the Republic, Teta decides to prepare her own forces.

In Naga Sadow's hidden fortress on the dark side of Kar Shian, he trains Gav Daragon in the ways of the Sith. Sadow sends his Massassi warriors to retrieve the Starbreaker 12 from Ziost and then travels to his decoy fortress on Khar Delba, where Jori Daragon is held. On Ziost, Sadow's loyal Massassi steal the Starbreaker 12, but not without leaving evidence of their Master's involvement. Ludo Kressh discovers this evidence, and together with his supporters, Horak-mul and Dor Gal-ram, he prepares to attack Sadow's fortress on Khar Delba. Meanwhile, the Starbreaker 12 arrives there.

Kressh's forces have arrived at Khar Delba and have opened fire at Sadow's apparently defenseless fortress. Sadow convinces Daragon that she must return to the Republic before the fortress is destroyed. Reluctant to leave her brother behind, she agrees. After the Starbreaker 12 has escaped to hyperspace, Sadow calls in his fleet that he had hidden on the dark side of Khar Shian. But that is not all; Massassi warriors on the ships of Horak-mul and Dol Gal-ram kill the Sith Lords and direct their fire on Kressh, who has no choice but to retreat. After this victory, Sadow prepares his forces to invade the Republic, using the tracking beacon hidden on the Starbreaker 12.

==== The Fall of the Sith Empire ====
The Fall of the Sith Empire (1997) is a five-part arc by Kevin J. Anderson, Dario Carrasco, Dario Carrasco Jr, Bill Black, David Jacob Beckett, and Ray Murtaugh. Set in the same era as the previous comic, many battles are recounted.

The Battle of Coruscant was the first battle between the Galactic Republic and Naga Sadow's Sith Empire. Memit Nadill, trusting in Odan-Urr's judgement, came to Coruscant to rally the Jedi before the Sith were to attack, but the invasion fleet came early. The Coruscant defense forces led by Jedi Guardian Anavus Svag defended the planet as other Republic forces and Jedi joined the defense. The size of the Sith Lord's army is visually exaggerated and influenced by Sadow himself, meditating in his meditation sphere high above Primus Goluud. When Gav Daragon fires on the sphere, Naga Sadow's concentration is disrupted, causing much of the army on Coruscant to fade. This increases the confidence and resolve of the Jedi and Republic soldiers, allowing them to take advantage and repel the Sith invasion.

The Battle of Koros Major is fought between the army of Koros and the Sith Empire. Naga Sadow's focus is on the Battle of Coruscant, so he appoints his prisoner Gav Daragon as commander of the Koros Major invasion fleet. As the battle begins, Gav lands on the planet to look for his sister Jori, with a group of Massassi bodyguards. As Gav enters Aarrba the Hutt's repair dock, his bodyguards see the Hutt as a threat, and attack and kill him. Jori enters at that exact moment and attacks Gav with a lightsaber given to her by Odan-Urr, assuming he had killed Aarrba. Gav escapes and flees the planet, leaving Teta's men to battle the Sith to eventual victory.

The Battle of Kirrek is fought between the army of Koros and the Sith Empire. Prior to the battle, Empress Teta had made an agreement with Commander Llaban, commander of the rebellion in the earlier Battle of Kirrek, to fight alongside each other to defend Kirrek against the Sith, earning amnesty for the ex-rebels. She also decides to let the prisoners mining the colony world of Ronika to fight in the defense of Kirrek, but they are absent for the beginning of the battle. Early in the battle, Odan-Urr attempts to use his Battle Meditation as he did during the Unification Wars, but the fury and determination of the Massassi warriors is infallible. Led by the Sith Lord Shar Dakhan, the Massassi break through the line of defenders and begin climbing the wall. Separating much of the defenders from the Sith onslaught, Odan-Urr's Master Ooroo orders the Kirrek rebels to find cover. He then tips himself over, shattering his cyanogen tank and sending the fumes into the breaths of several Massassi, killing them instantly. This kills Ooroo as well, as oxygen is just as toxic to him as cyanogen is to the Massassi. As the prisoners from Ronika arrive, and with the death of the Sith commander, victory for the Tetans quickly becomes a foregone conclusion.

The Battle of Primus Goluud takes place above the red supergiant Primus Goluud between Empress Teta's forces and the Sith Empire. Jori Daragon leads Empress Teta to her brother Gav, presuming he has turned to the dark side of the Force. Gav, trapped in Sadow's meditation sphere, proves he is still on their side by transmitting the coordinates to Korriban to Teta's ship. Soon, the dark lord's ships arrives and engages the Koros battalion. Sadow wastes no time in using a superweapon attached to his flagship to trigger solar flares across Primus Goluud. The Sith forces retreat to the Sith Empire, closely followed by Teta's ships, as Gav is left to die in the meditation sphere.

The First Battle of Korriban is fought between Naga Sadow and Ludo Kressh's respective war fleets high above the Sith funeral world of Korriban. Fleeing the Battle of Primus Goluud, Sadow's fleet is confronted by Kressh, who declares himself the new Dark Lord of the Sith and banishes Sadow from the Sith Empire. A fierce battle between the Sith Lords ensues, until Sadow crashes one of his ships into Kressh's flagship, killing the new Dark Lord.

The Second Battle of Korriban immediately follows the first battle. The Tetan forces, using coordinates given to them by Gav Daragon, come out of hyperspace very soon after Kressh's death in the First Battle of Korriban, catching Sadow by surprise. This allows the Koros ships to quickly put the Sith Empire's forces at a disadvantage. Sadow has another trick up his sleeve, however; the Dark Lord orders his Massassi to kill their commanders on each ship, leaving a massive, impassable barricade between himself and the Koros fleet. Sadow then flees to Yavin 4 with his one remaining ship, to hopefully rebuild the once glorious Sith legacy.

=== Sequel ===
Redemption (1998) is a five-part arc by Kevin J. Anderson and Chris Gossett. It is set ten years after the end of the original comic run.

Hoggon's ship arrives in the Yavin System and makes its way to the surface. Hoggon tells Ulic of the events that happened there, but all Ulic can see is ghosts, including that of his dead brother, Cay. Ulic tells Hoggon that this place will not do as well.

On Ryloth, many Twi'leks flee as a heat storm rages upon them, with Jedi Tott Doneeta doing what he can to help. He tries using the force to hold back the storm, but is overwhelmed, receiving burns across the side of his face. Rather than stay and rest his wounds, he announces that he must leave for the Great Jedi Convocation.

On Exis Station, Master Thon arrives, meeting Vima Sunrider, now a teenager. The two are shortly interrupted by the Cathar Jedi Sylvar, and the two Jedi leave Vima to join the convocation that has begun. While Nomi speaks, Vima gets bored and decides to take off and try out flying a mining ship. But, while flying, Vima gets caught in a magnetic loop and has her ship disabled and is forced to eject. She is then rescued by a late arrival for the convocation, Tott Doneeta. Upon arriving back at the station, Nomi questions her daughter's actions, asking how she can expect to become a Jedi with such brash choices. Vima responds by saying if Nomi would spend more time training her, she could have gotten out of it herself.

Elsewhere, Hoggon's ship arrives on the icy surface of Rhen Var. Upon landing, Ulic announces that he is satisfied with this place. Hoggon arrives at Exis Station and takes a place in an airshaft to watch the convocation, as Sylvar has taken the chance to speak. She talks of Ulic Qel-Droma and mentions that he betrayed the Jedi and now wanders free. She makes reference to Ulic's conspiring with Exar Kun, and the death of Jedi, including her mate Crado. She then states that Ulic is the greatest shame of the Jedi Knights.

On Rhen Var, Ulic takes up his lightsaber, but cannot feel anything in the force. The weapon is nothing but a tool in his hands. The ground beneath him then gives way, dropping him into a hole.

Back on Exis, Vima stares at two hologram's belonging to her mother; one is Vima's father, Andur, and the other is Ulic. Vima asks her mother about training, to which Nomi responds with "not today." Vima then goes off to the docking bay, stowing away on a ship, intent on finding her own trainer. Also in the docking bay is Tott, who asks Sylvar to come with him to Ryloth, in order to deal with the anger within her.

Upon arriving at the new city of Tott's clan, the two Jedi are told of an attack on the clan by another clan. Tott leaves to deal with the situation and asks Sylvar to help while he is gone. Sylvar decides to try and rally the clan, telling them that they must attack and have revenge. Tott returns to announce that blood shed does not create peaces, and that a solution has been reached; the two clan leaders will go into the desert together and a new head-clan will join the tribes. Not used to the difference in custom, Sylvar asks to be taken home to Cathar.

On Rhen Var, Ulic looks back on what he has done in the past; betraying Nomi and killing Cay. He considers this to be a place as good as any to die, but is urged to live on by an image of his deceased teacher, Master Arca Jeth. Ulic pulls his strength together and climbs back up through the snow.

On Exis Station, Nomi finds her hologram of Ulic missing, and is told by Master Thon that Vima is missing.

On his ship, Hoggon discovers that Vima has stowed away on his ship. Vima says she is looking for Ulic Qel-Droma, and show Hoggon the hologram. Hoggon takes her to Rhen Var and drops her on the planet, giving her a transmitter with which to contact him. After Hoggon leaves, Vima states that she will not leave until she is a Jedi.

== Collected editions ==
- Tales of the Jedi: Knights of the Old Republic (1994) ISBN 1-56971-020-1
- Tales of the Jedi: The Freedon Nadd Uprising (1995) ISBN 1-56971-307-3
- Tales of the Jedi: Dark Lords of the Sith (1996) ISBN 1-56971-095-3
- Tales of the Jedi: The Sith War (1996) ISBN 1-56971-173-9
- Tales of the Jedi: The Golden Age of the Sith (1997) ISBN 1-56971-229-8
- Tales of the Jedi: The Fall of the Sith Empire (1998) ISBN 1-56971-320-0
- Tales of the Jedi: Redemption (2001) ISBN 1-56971-535-1
- Star Wars Omnibus: Tales of the Jedi Volume 1 (2007) ISBN 1-59307-830-7
- Star Wars Omnibus: Tales of the Jedi Volume 2 (2008) ISBN 1-59307-911-7

== Legacy ==
The publisher West End Games produced a role-playing game sourcebook related to the first three arcs of the series.

Veitch reused his character Ood Bnar in Dark Empire II, set thousands of years later. Along with Tales of the Jedi the story is no longer canon. The novelization of The Rise of Skywalker references Ommin, and the junior novelization references Naga Sadow.

Exar Kun also appears in the 1994 tie-in novel Star Wars: Dark Apprentice by Kevin J. Anderson, which is also no longer canon. The novel is set in the era of Luke Skywalker and his Jedi Academy, with Kun's ghost serving as the story's main antagonist. Exar Kun was made canon in the Disney-era continuity in the promotional materials and sourcebooks associated with the 2018 film Solo: A Star Wars Story.

Bioware released series of games from 2004-2011 entitled Star Wars: Knights of the Old Republic, Star Wars: Knights of the Old Republic II: The Sith Lords, and Star Wars: The Old Republic, which take place shortly after Tales of the Jedi and frequently reference its events, though all 3 games are no longer considered canon.

The 2022 canon novel Shadow of the Sith establishes that the planet Ossus, introduced in The Freedon Nadd Uprising, is the location of Luke Skywalker's Jedi temple, which is depicted in a 2022 episode of The Book of Boba Fett.

== See also ==
- Star Wars: Dawn of the Jedi
- Star Wars: The High Republic
- Star Wars: Knights of the Old Republic (video game)
- Tales of the Jedi (TV series), an unrelated animated anthology series which shares the name and a similar logo
