= Jan Duursema =

American comics artist

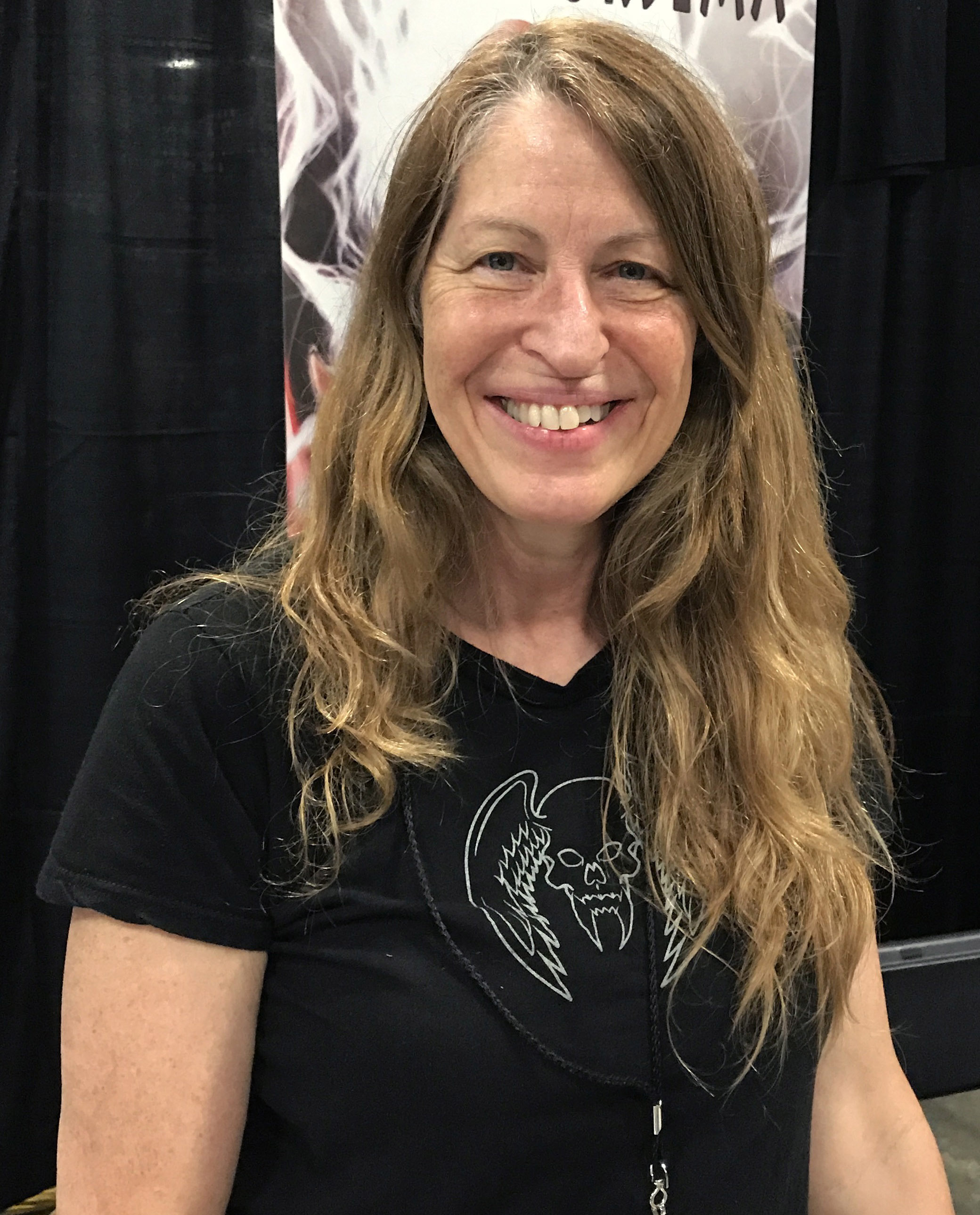
- Duursema at the East Coast Comicon
- Born: October 27, 1954 (age 72)
- Areas: Penciller, Inker
- Notable works: Arion, Lord of Atlantis; Star Wars; The Warlord
- Awards: Russ Manning Most Promising Newcomer Award, 1983
- Spouse: Tom Mandrake

Jan Duursema (/ˈdɜːrzmə/; born October 27, 1954) is an American comics artist known for her work on the Star Wars comics franchise. She is the creator of Denin and Vila from Naldar, the Twi'lek Jedi Aayla Secura and the Kiffar Jedi Quinlan Vos.

== Career ==
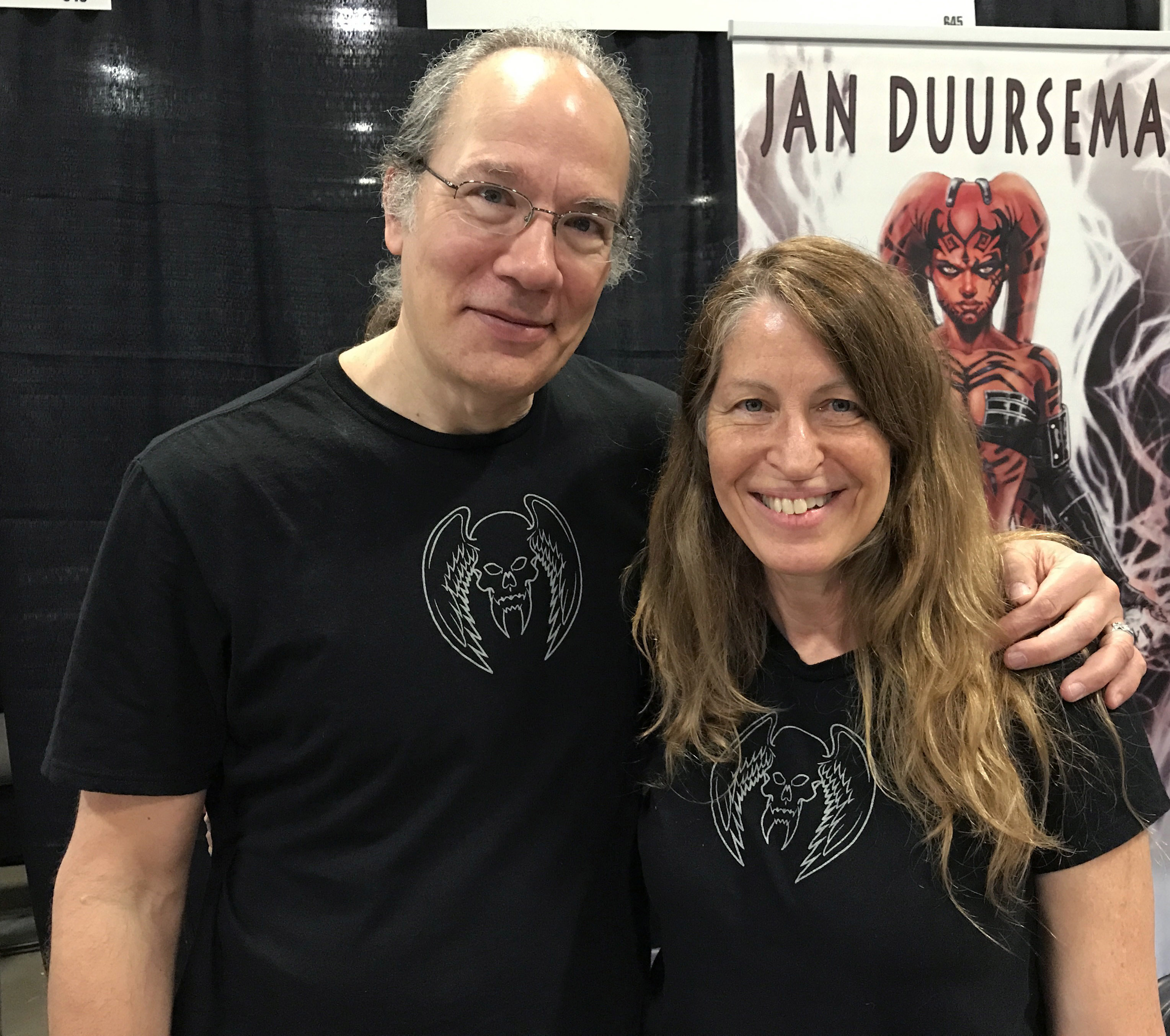
Duursema with her husband, fellow comics artist Tom Mandrake

Jan Duursema's first published comics work appeared in Heavy Metal vol. 3 #3 (July 1979). She drew several stories for DC Comics' Sgt. Rock title beginning in 1980. With writer Paul Kupperberg, she co-created the Arion character in The Warlord #55 (March 1982) and the Arion, Lord of Atlantis series was launched in November 1982. Duursema was one of the artists of Wonder Woman #300 (Feb. 1983). She provided artwork to the Star Ace role-playing game from Pacesetter Ltd. Her first work for Marvel Comics, as well as her first work on the Star Wars franchise, appeared in Star Wars #92 (Feb. 1985). Back at DC, she was one of the contributors to the DC Challenge limited series in 1986 and drew the Advanced Dungeons and Dragons comic book series for three years. She briefly worked with John Ostrander on the Hawkworld series in 1992 and again the following year when the title was cancelled and relaunched as Hawkman.

Her association with Dark Horse Comics' Star Wars franchise began with Star Wars: Chewbacca #2 (Feb. 2000). She has since drawn several Star Wars series for Dark Horse including the Star Wars: Darth Maul mini-series in 2000 and the comics adaptation of Star Wars: Episode II – Attack of the Clones in 2002. Duursema and Ostrander collaborated on the Star Wars: Legacy series, which was introduced with a #0 issue and ran for 50 issues from June 2006 to August 2010. They launched the Star Wars: Dawn of the Jedi series in 2012.

Duursema was the basis for the character Ur-Sema Du.

== Advertising ==
In 2011 Nike, Inc. commissioned Duursema and fellow comics artist Amanda Conner to create artwork for the Make Yourself: A Super Power advertising campaign.

== Awards ==
Duursema received the Russ Manning Outstanding Newcomer Award in 1983.

== Personal life ==
Duursema is married to fellow comic book artist Tom Mandrake, whom she met while both were students at The Kubert School. Their wedding was held on the school's grounds. The couple have two children: Jack Moses Mandrake and Sian Mandrake, who is also a Kubert School-trained comics illustrator.

== Bibliography ==
=== Dark Horse Comics ===
- Star Wars: Chewbacca #2 (2000)
- Star Wars: Republic #16, 19–22, 32–35, 42–45, 49–50, 54, 59, 63, 65–66, 68–77, 81–83 (2000–2006)
- Star Wars Tales #3, 7, 11 (2000–2002)
- Star Wars: Darth Maul, miniseries, #1–4 (2000)
- Star Wars: Episode II – Attack of the Clones, miniseries, #1–4 (2002)
- Star Wars: Jedi:
  - Aayla Secura (2003)
  - Count Dooku (2003)
  - Mace Windu (2003)
  - Shaak Ti (2003)
- Star Wars: Legacy #0–3, 5–7, 11–12, 14–19, 23–26, 28–31, 34–35, 37–40, 43–50 (2006–2010)
- Star Wars: Legacy: One for One (2010)
- Star Wars: Dawn of the Jedi:
  - Star Wars: Dawn of the Jedi #0 (2012)
  - Star Wars: Dawn of the Jedi—Force Storm #1–5 (2012)
  - Star Wars: Dawn of the Jedi—The Prisoner of Bogan #1–5 (2012–2013)
  - Star Wars: Dawn of the Jedi—Force War #1–5 (2013–2014)

=== DC Comics ===
- Advanced Dungeons and Dragons #1–22, 24–30, 33–36, Annual #1 (1988–1991)
- Arak, Son of Thunder #8–11 (1982)
- Arion, Lord of Atlantis #1–21, 23, 27, 30–35, Special #1 (1982–1985)
- Batman #392 (inks over Tom Mandrake) (1986)
- Batman and the Outsiders Annual #1 (among other artists) (1984)
- Convergence Nightwing / Oracle #1–2 (2015)
- DC Challenge #12 (1986)
- Detective Comics Annual #5 (inks over Tom Mandrake) (1992)
- Earth 2: World's End #4–7, 10 (2014–2015)
- Green Lantern #163 (inks over Chuck Patton) (1983)
- Hawkman vol. 3 #1–4, Annual #1 (1993–1994)
- Hawkworld #27–29 (1992)
- Heroes Against Hunger #1 (1986)
- House of Mystery #301 (1982)
- Justice League Quarterly #5 (1991)
- Martian Manhunter vol. 2 #5 (1999)
- Omega Men #36 (1986)
- The Outsiders #8, 16 (1986–1987)
- Saga of the Swamp Thing #9 (1983)
- Scooby Apocalypse #11–14 (2017)
- Sgt. Rock #347–352, 357–360, 362, 364 (1980–1982)
- Shazam!: The New Beginning #2 (inks over Tom Mandrake) (1987)
- Star Trek #34 (1992)
- Swamp Thing vol. 2 #117 (1992)
- Tangent Comics / Nightwing #1 (1997)
- Tangent Comics / Nightwing: Night Force #1 (1998)
- The Warlord #55–62 (Arion); #60–62, 123–133 (The Warlord) (1982–1988)
- Weird War Tales #98 (1981)
- Wonder Woman #300 (among other artists) (1983)

=== Marvel Comics ===
- The Avengers #369 (1993)
- The Incredible Hulk #399–402 (1992–1993)
- Professor Xavier and the X-Men #1–4, 6 (1995–1996)
- Spider-Man Unlimited #5 (1994)
- Star Wars #92 (1985)
- Uncanny X-Men #305 (1993)
- Wolverine: Knight of Terra (1995)
- X-Factor #97, 99–104, 106, 108–111, 200 (1993–2010)
- X-Man #10 (among other artists) (1995)
- X-Men: Road to Onslaught (among other artists) (1996)
- X-Men 2099 #32–35 (1996)
- X-Men Unlimited #2 (1993)

=== Other publishers ===
- Elric: The Vanishing Tower, miniseries, #1–6 (First Comics, 1987–1988)

Preceded by Art Thibert	The Warlord artist 1987–1988	Succeeded by n/a
Preceded by Graham Nolan	Hawkworld artist 1992	Succeeded by Timothy Truman
Preceded by Dale Keown	The Incredible Hulk artist 1992–1993	Succeeded by Gary Frank
Preceded by n/a	Hawkman vol. 3 artist 1993–1994	Succeeded by Steve Lieber
