= Allen Bellman =

American comic book artist (1924–2020)

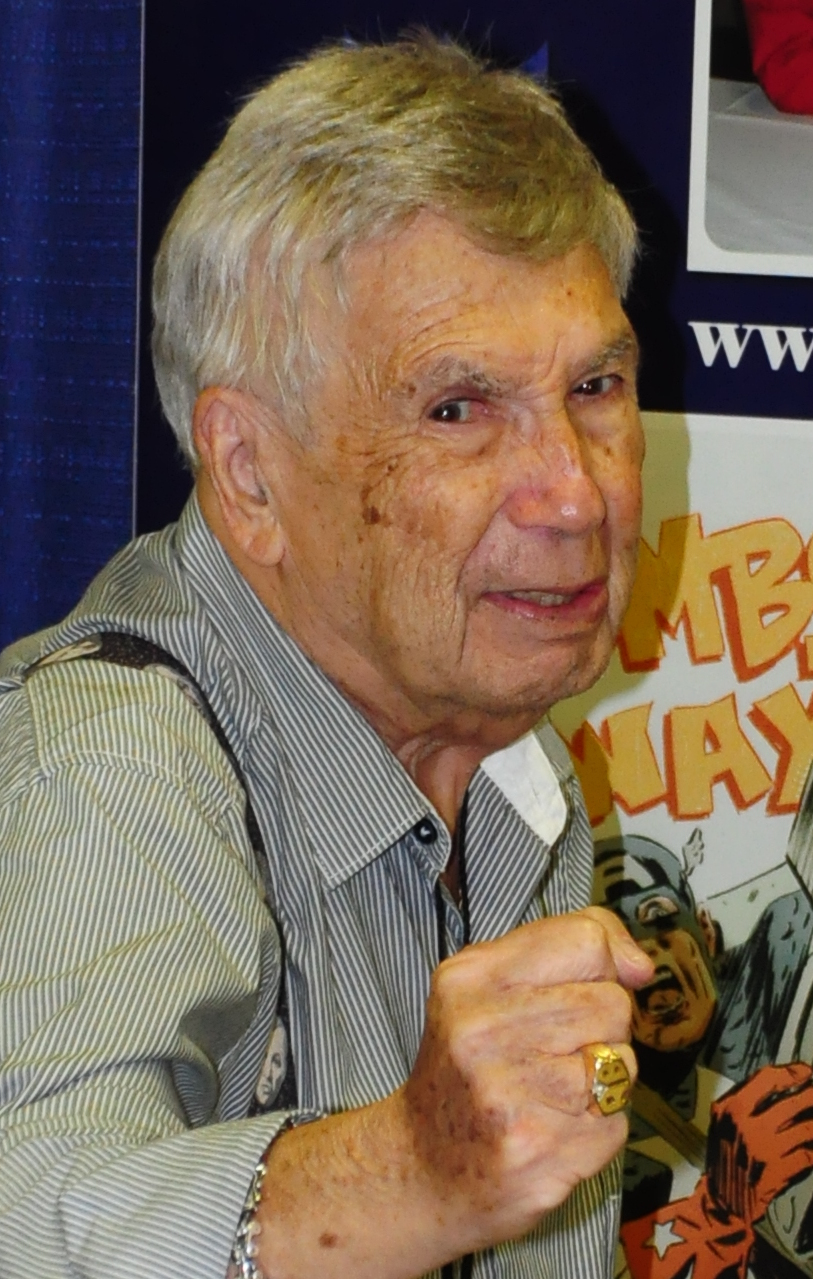
Bellman at the Florida Supercon in 2012

Allen Bellman (June 5, 1924 – March 9, 2020) was an American comic book artist whose career began in the Golden Age of Comic Books.

== Career ==
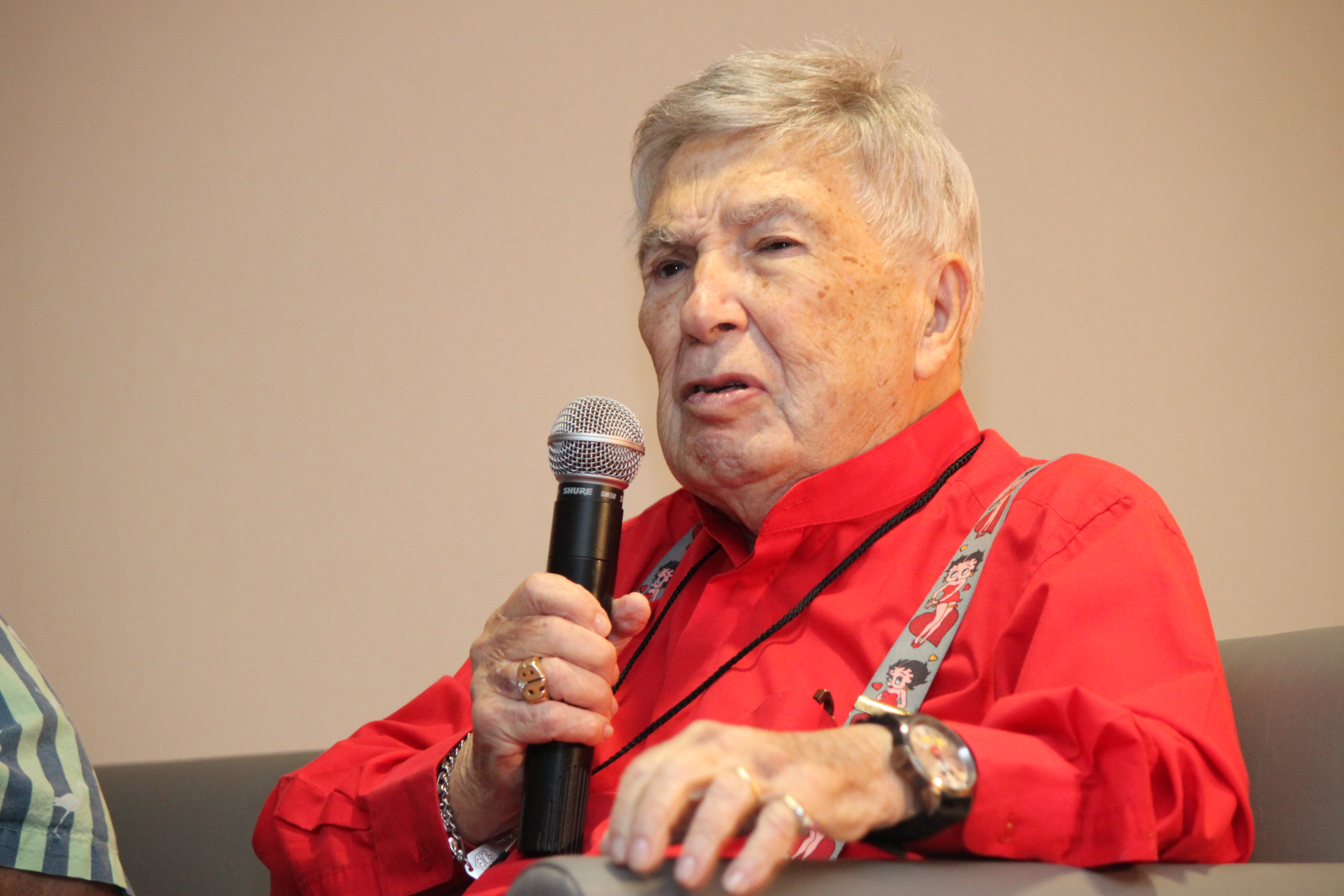
Bellman at the Florida Supercon in 2012

External videos
- Broward County Honors South Florida Comic Book Legend, Allen Bellman, For Jewish-American Heritage Month from WFOR-TV (May 7, 2019)

As a child in New York City, Bellman became enchanted by comics when he saw a copy of Action Comics #1 and purchased it. He first began working for Timely Comics/Atlas Comics in 1942 after seeing an advertisement in the newspaper, with one of his first assignments being on early Captain America stories.

After his work in the comics industry ended, he continued to attend comic book conventions into his 90s; he moved to southern Florida and retired from the comic book industry in the 1960s. In 2007, he was awarded the Inkpot Award. In 2020, Bellman was awarded the Inkwell Awards Stacey Aragon Special Recognition Award (SASRA).

== List of works ==
- Timely Confidential: When the Golden Age of Comic Books Was Young (December 1, 2017) Allen Bellman (author), Michael J. Vassallo (editor), Audrey Parente (editor). CreateSpace Independent Publishing Platform ISBN 1979903034
