= Inker =

Comic book or graphic novel line artist

The inker (sometimes credited as the finisher or embellisher) is one of the two line artists in traditional American comic book production.

After the penciller creates a drawing with pencil, the inker interprets this drawing by outlining and embellishing it with a pencil, an ink pen or a brush with black ink. Inking was necessary in the traditional printing process as presses could not reproduce pencilled drawings. Another specialist, the letterer, handles the "inking" of text and word balloons, while the colorist applies color to the final inked art submitted by the inker.

== Workflow ==
While inking can involve tracing pencil lines in a literal sense, it is an act of creative interpretation rather than rote copying. Inkers fine-tune the composition by adding the proper thickness to lines, creating visual contrast through shading, and making other artistic choices. A pencil drawing can have many shades of grey depending on the hardness of the graphite used, and the pressure applied by the artist, but an ink line generally can be only solid black. Accordingly, the inker has to translate pencil shading into patterns of ink, for example by using closely spaced parallel lines, feathering, or cross-hatching. The result is that the final look of a penciller's art can vary enormously depending on the inker.

An experienced inker paired with a novice penciler might also be responsible for correcting anatomical or other mistakes, modifying facial expressions, or changing or improving the artwork in a variety of other ways. Alternatively, an inker may do the basic layout of the page, give the work to another artist to do more detailed pencil work, and then ink the page themself (as Joe Simon often did when inking Jack Kirby, or when Michael T. Gilbert collaborated with penciler P. Craig Russell on the Elric of Melniboné series).

The division between penciller and inker described here is most frequently found where the penciller and inker are hired independently of each other by the publisher. Where an artist instead hires their own assistants, the roles are less structured; an artist might, for example, ink all the faces of the characters while leaving the assistant to ink in the backgrounds, or work with the inker in a more collaborative fashion. Among Neal Adams' Crusty Bunkers artists' studio collective, one inker may have been responsible for the characters' heads, another doing bodies, and a third embellishing backgrounds. The inking duo Akin & Garvey had a similar arrangement, with one inking the figures and the other the backgrounds.

In Europe, the division of art into pencilling and inking is less common, and well-known artists typically ink and letter their own work.

=== Digital inking ===
One can ink digitally using computers, a practice that has started to become more common as inkers learn to use powerful drawing and editing tools such as Adobe Illustrator and Photoshop, Inkscape, Corel Painter, and Manga Studio. A graphics tablet and stylus is the most common tool used to accurately ink digitally, and use of vector-based programs precludes pixelization due to changes in resolution. However, the process is more time-consuming.

As of 2015 some companies put scanned pencils on an FTP site. The inker downloads them, prints them in blue, inks the pages, scans them in and loads the finished pages back on the FTP site for the company to download. While this procedure saves a company time and shipping costs, it requires artists to spend money on computer equipment.

== History ==
In the early days of comic books, inkers were often apprentices, hired by a more experienced artist to assist them with producing the pages. In the early days of comic books, many publishers hired "packagers" to produce entire books. Although some "star" creators' names (such as Simon and Kirby or Bob Kane) usually appeared at the beginning of each story, the publisher generally did not credit the assistants. In the early days, the creator of the feature would get credit for as long as they worked on the feature, but when they were replaced by other artists, no name credit would be given to them. Some packagers instituted an assembly line style method of creating books, using top talents like Kirby to create the look and pace of the story and then handing off the inking, lettering, and coloring to largely anonymous – and low-paid – creators to finish it.

Deadline pressures and a desire for consistency in the look of a feature led to having one artist pencil a feature while one or more other artists inked it. At Marvel Comics in the 1960s and later, where the pencil artist was responsible for the panel-by-panel breakdown of the story plot, an artist who was skilled in storytelling would be encouraged to do as many books as possible, maximizing the number of books they could do by leaving the inking to others. By contrast, at other companies where the writer did the panel-by-panel breakdown in script form, more artists inked or even lettered their own work. Artists such as Joe Kubert, Jim Aparo, Sheldon Mayer and Alex Toth would usually pencil, ink and letter their own work, considering the placing of word balloons as an integral part of the page, and artists such as Bill Everett, Steve Ditko, Kurt Schaffenberger, Murphy Anderson, and Nick Cardy almost always inked their own work (and sometimes the work of other pencilers as well). Most artists, however – even experienced inkers of their own work like Lou Fine, Reed Crandall, Will Eisner, and Alex Toth – at times hired or allowed other artists to ink their drawings. Some artists could make more money by pencilling more pages and leaving the inking to others; different artists with different working methods might find it more profitable to both pencil and ink, as they could place less information and detail in the pencil drawings if they were inking it themselves and could put that detail in at the inking stage.

Due to the absence of credits on most Golden Age comic books, many inkers of that period are largely forgotten. For those whose names are known, it is difficult to compile résumés. Inkers like Chic Stone, George Papp, and Marvin Stein embellished thousands of pages during that era, most of which are still unidentified.

== Crediting ==
In the early 1960s, Marvel Comics began giving the inker credit in each of their publications and other publishers began to follow suit. This allowed finishers like Dick Ayers, Joe Sinnott, Mike Esposito, John Severin, Syd Shores, and Tom Palmer to earn a reputation as inkers as well as pencillers. In addition, penciller–inker teams like Kirby and Sinnott, Curt Swan and Murphy Anderson, and Gene Colan and Palmer, captured the attention of comic book readers and fans.

== Industry awards ==
In 2008 Marvel and DC inker Bob Almond founded the Inkwell Awards to celebrate the craft of inking and to lift the profile of the art in general. The Inkwell Awards have gained much publicity and count notable inkers such as Joe Sinnott, Nathan Massengill and Tim Townsend as members and associates.

== Notable inkers ==
- Dan Adkins
- Mike Allred
- Murphy Anderson
- Terry Austin
- Brett Breeding
- Vince Colletta
- Vince Deporter
- Tony DeZuniga
- Mike Esposito
- Joe Giella
- Dick Giordano
- Al Gordon
- Dan Green
- Mark Irwin
- Billy Graham
- Klaus Janson
- George Klein
- Paul Neary
- Kevin Nowlan
- Tom Palmer
- Jimmy Palmiotti
- Branko Plavšić
- Josef Rubinstein
- Joe Sinnott
- Alex Toth
- Frank Frazetta
- Frank Miller
- Bob Smith
- Karl Story
- Art Thibert
- Rade Tovladijac
- Dexter Vines
- Scott Williams
- Al Williamson
- Wally Wood
- Bernie Wrightson

== Notable penciller–inker partnerships ==
- Curt Swan/George Klein – Worked for decades on DC's Superman titles. Commander R. A. Benson, USN (Ret.) wrote "[I]t was Swan with Klein who created the definitive Superman image [that] typified the Silver Age".
- Curt Swan/Murphy Anderson – Notably on the early 1970s Superman titles, the team is often referred to as "Swanderson."
- Jack Kirby/Joe Simon – possibly the first true tandem, in their heyday they defined Captain America, The Red Skull, Sandman and Sandy, Manhunter, the Boy Commandos, romance comics, and much more.
- John Severin/Will Elder – EC war and science fiction
- Jack Kirby/Dick Ayers – Ayers probably being Kirby's most prolific partner, the pair produced hundreds of pages of Western and monster stories before the Marvel superhero era began.
- Jack Kirby/Joe Sinnott – the early years of the Fantastic Four
- Jack Kirby/Mike Royer - Royer inked much of Kirby's early 1970s work
- Ross Andru/Mike Esposito – the pair worked together on-and-off for over 40 years, for DC and Marvel, on such titles as Showcase, Wonder Woman, the Metal Men, and The Amazing Spider-Man
- Dick Ayers/John Severin – Sgt. Fury
- Gene Colan/Syd Shores – 1960s Daredevil
- John Buscema/Tom Palmer – 1960s Avengers
- Neal Adams/Tom Palmer – late 1960s X-Men and Avengers
- Neal Adams/Dick Giordano – late 1960s/early 1970s era Batman, Detective Comics, and Green Lantern/Green Arrow
- Gene Colan/Tom Palmer – Daredevil, Tomb of Dracula, Doctor Strange
- John Byrne/Terry Austin – a run on the Uncanny X-Men
- Frank Miller/Klaus Janson – Daredevil and Batman: The Dark Knight Returns
- George Pérez/Romeo Tanghal – the New Teen Titans
- Ron Frenz/Brett Breeding – many projects but most notably late 1980s The Amazing Spider-Man, Thor, and late 1990s Avengers Next
- Stephen R. Bissette/John Totleben – Alan Moore's Swamp Thing
- Jim Lee/Scott Williams – Uncanny X-Men, WildCATS, and All Star Batman and Robin the Boy Wonder
- Joe Quesada/Jimmy Palmiotti – many projects, notably Ash and Daredevil
- Ed McGuinness/Dexter Vines – known as "eDex," they've partnered on (among others) Civil War, Superman/Batman, and JLA Classified
- Bryan Hitch/Paul Neary – Known for their run on "The Ultimates", written by Mark Millar.
- Greg Capullo/Danny Miki – Known for their run on Todd McFarlane's "Spawn" in the mid 1990s.
- Jan Duursema/Dan Parsons – Known for Dark Horse Star Wars comics "Republic","Legacy", and"Dawn of the Jedi" in the early 2000s.

== See also ==
- Script (comics)
- Penciller
- Letterer
- Colorist
