= List of Silver Age comics creators =

The Silver Age of Comic Books was a period of artistic advancement and commercial success in mainstream American comic books, predominantly in the superhero genre, that lasted roughly from 1956 to the late 1960s/early 1970s. Many editors, writers, pencillers and inkers participated in this revival.

== Editors ==
- Dick Giordano
- Stan Lee
- Jack Schiff
- Julius Schwartz
- Mort Weisinger

== Writers ==
- Otto Binder
- John Broome
- Arnold Drake
- Gardner Fox
- Gary Friedrich
- Joe Gill
- Archie Goodwin
- Edmond Hamilton
- Bob Haney
- Robert Kanigher
- Stan Lee
- Larry Lieber
- Dennis O'Neil
- Jerry Siegel
- Jim Steranko
- Roy Thomas

== Pencilers ==
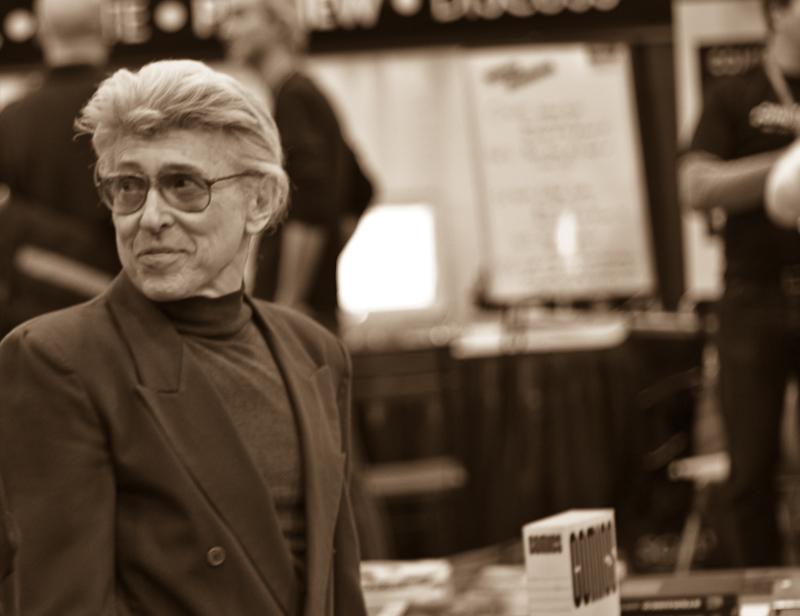
Jim Steranko

- Neal Adams
- Murphy Anderson
- Ross Andru
- Jim Aparo
- Dick Ayers
- Wayne Boring
- John Buscema
- Sal Buscema
- Nick Cardy
- Gene Colan a.k.a. Adam Austin
- Dan DeCarlo
- Steve Ditko
- Ramona Fradon
- Stan Goldberg
- Don Heck
- Carmine Infantino
- Gil Kane a.k.a. Scott Edwards
- Jack Kirby
- Joe Kubert
- Larry Lieber
- Sheldon Moldoff
- Jim Mooney
- John Romita, Sr.
- Kurt Schaffenberger
- Mike Sekowsky
- John Severin
- Marie Severin
- Jim Steranko
- Curt Swan
- Herb Trimpe
- George Tuska
- Wally Wood

== Inkers ==
- Jack Abel
- Sol Brodsky
- Dan Adkins
- Murphy Anderson
- Dick Ayers
- Vince Colletta
- Mike Esposito a.k.a. Mickey Demeo
- Frank Giacoia a.k.a. Frank Ray
- Joe Giella
- Sid Greene
- George Klein
- Tom Palmer
- Paul Reinman
- George Roussos a.k.a. George Bell
- Christopher Rule
- Joe Sinnott
- Chic Stone

== Letterers ==
- Joe Rosen
