= Heap (comics) =

Comic book character

The Heap
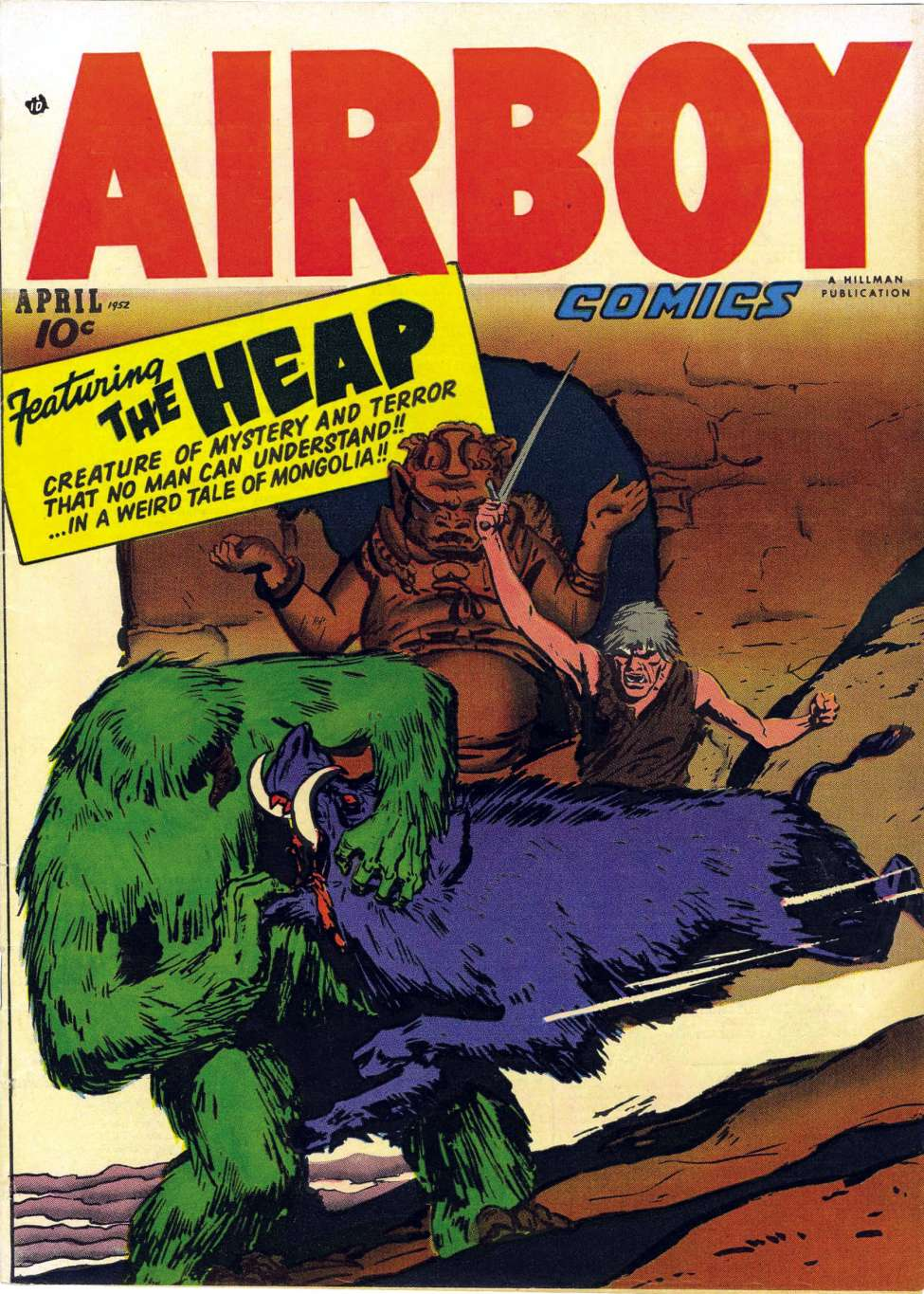
- The Heap: Airboy Comics vol. 9 #3 (April 1952), cover art by Ernie Schroeder.

Publication information
- Publisher: Hillman Periodicals; Eclipse; Image
- First appearance: Air Fighters #3 (Dec. 1942)
- Created by: Harry Stein; Mort Leav

In-story information
- Alter ego: Baron Eric von Emmelman; Jim Roberts; Eddie Beckett
- Team affiliations: The New Wave; Greenworld
- Abilities: Strength and durability derived from size and composition; can engulf enemies and transport them to the Greenworld (Image version)

The Heap is the name of several fictional comic book muck-monsters, the original of which first appeared in Hillman Periodicals' Air Fighters Comics #3 (cover-dated Dec. 1942), during the period fans and historians call the Golden Age of Comic Books. The Heap was comics' first swamp monster.

The character was created by writer Harry Stein and artist Mort Leav, in collaboration with Hillman editor Ed Cronin.

Similar but unrelated characters appeared in comics stories published by Skywald in the 1970s and Image Comics in the 1990s. The Heap was revived in the 1980s by Eclipse Comics.

== Publication history ==
=== Hillman ===
The Heap debuted in the aviation feature "SkyWolf" in Air Fighters Comics #3 (cover-dated Dec. 1942), in the story "Wanted By the Nazis" by writer Harry Stein and artist Mort Leav, and continued as a sporadic guest character. With its fifth appearance, in the by-then re-titled Airboy Comics vol. 3, #9 (Oct. 1946), the Heap became the star of its own backup feature, which continued until the final issue, vol. 10, #4 (May 1953). Other artists associated with Hillman's Heap include Jack Abel, Paul Reinman, and Ernie Schroeder.

In 1986, Eclipse Comics, having acquired rights to some Hillman characters, began publishing a new Airboy comic with the Heap as a supporting character. The Heap also appeared in the Eclipse title The New Wave, where the creature was considered by some members of that group to be a member. Eclipse Comics went bankrupt and ceased operations in the 1990s. Image Comics purchased the Eclipse assets, including the Heap.

A version of Baron von Emmelman also appears in the novel The Bloody Red Baron, part of the Anno Dracula series by Kim Newman. Here he and the other great pilots of the First World War are vampires, and his monstrous form is the result of experiments to improve his vampiric abilities.

Skywald's The Heap #1 (Sept. 1971): Cover art by Tom Sutton and Jack Abel.

=== Similar characters from other publishers ===
The fifth issue of EC's Mad included a story called "Outer Sanctum" (a parody of Inner Sanctum Mystery), which featured a monster made out of garbage called "Heap".

A similar character called The Heap, who did not share the original character's origin or identity, appeared in the publisher Skywald's black-and-white horror-comics magazine Psycho, in most issues from #2-13 (March 1971 - July 1973). This version was created by writer Charles McNaughton and the longtime penciler-inker team of Ross Andru & Mike Esposito. Andru quickly took over scripting as well, later teaming with penciler-inker Pablo Marcos, who remained after editor Al Hewetson took over the writing. The final two stories were drawn by Xavier G. Vilanova, variously credited at Skywald and elsewhere as simply "Vilanova" or "Villanova".

This Heap also starred in the one-shot comics magazine The Heap #1 (Sept. 1971), written by Robert Kanigher and penciled by Tom Sutton. The company went defunct later that decade, and historians are uncertain whether it had formally acquired character rights from Hillman, which had ceased publishing in the mid-1950s.

Marvel Comics writer/editor Roy Thomas, a fan of the original Heap character and a co-creator of Marvel's muck monster (the Man-Thing), said he suggested that Skywald revive the Heap:

I was also responsible for Skywald Publishing introducing a Heap character. I had lunch with [Skywald co-founder] Sol Brodsky soon after he left Marvel Comics to co-found Skywald. He was looking for heroes to do. I couldn't write for him, so he was kind of picking my brain, and I wanted to help without getting too involved, since [Marvel editor-in-chief] Stan [Lee] wouldn't have liked that. I told Sol, 'Well, we have the Man-Thing, so you ought to get someone to revive the Heap'. He remembered the character since he was a comic-book artist in the 1940s.

In DC Comics' Swamp Thing, among the Parliament of Trees is a former Swamp Thing who is often cited as being a Man-Thing cameo. This character is identified as German pilot Albert Hollerer, who became the template for a Swamp Thing in the 1940s, but whose mind was damaged by his plane's crash. A miniature of his plane hanging near him when Swamp Thing visits him suggests readers of the Heap. He appeared in issues #47, 65, 89, 100, 105, 106, 109, 118, and 129.

Another similar character debuted in Image Comics' Spawn #73 (June 1998), reimagined by writers Todd McFarlane and Brian Holguin and penciler Greg Capullo.

In 2011, Moonstone Books published a three-issue miniseries starring the Heap. Though this character is described as a "concept created by Charles Knauf" in the credits, he shares the same origin as the Hillman version, albeit with a different look and Norse mythology elements.

== Fictional character biography ==
Image Comics' reimagined Heap.

=== Hillman/Eclipse version ===
The original Heap was formerly Baron Eric von Emmelman (his last name also sometimes spelled Emmelmann), a World War I German flying ace who was shot down in 1918 over a Polish swamp. Clinging to the smallest shred of life through sheer force of will (and, as it was later revealed, with the mystic help of the goddess Ceres, later to be referred to more generically in the series as Mother Nature), through the decades his body decayed and intermingled with the vegetation around him, becoming one with the marshland itself until at last a shaggy, shambling half-world creature neither animal nor man arose from the muck during the early years of World War II, a creature which would become known far and wide as The Heap.

Resembling a huge humanoid haystack whose most visible facial feature was a dangling root-like snout, the mute monstrosity first battled the lupine-cowled Blackhawk-style Allied ace SkyWolf before turning against its fellow Germans who were now fanatical followers of the evil Nazi cause. Then it took to wandering the globe, helping in its semi-mindless and often misunderstood way those in need and battling those monsters more malevolent than itself.

According to Jess Nevins' Encyclopedia of Golden Age Superheroes, the Heap's opponents "range from Axis agents to ordinary criminals to werewolves, disembodied murderous hands, giant lizards, voodoo houngans, sea serpents, and the Black Boar of Mongolia".

Capable of both savage violence and a surprising gentleness, for a time the Heap even had an unwilling "kid sidekick" of sorts in the form of Rickie Wood, a young boy whose remote control model biplane stirred murky memories of the hulking plant-thing's former life.

=== Skywald version ===
The Skywald version was pilot Jim Roberts, who accidentally crashed his cropduster plane into a tank of liquid nerve gas at an Army toxic waste dump and was horribly mutated into a jagged-fanged, long-tongued and glaring-eyed brute whose hideous blob-like body was virtually indestructible, bullets passing with a minimum of damage through the slimy gelatinous green "earth matter" which had replaced his fleshly form and which could regenerate against any injury up to and including near total incineration by a bolt of lightning. Unlike the previous incarnation, this Heap while mute was no mindless monstrosity and retained his human intelligence, allowing readers to share his every anguished thought as he wandered the world in a desperate attempt to find some method to either cure or kill himself.

=== Image version ===
The Image Comics version in Spawn, a series about a conflicted, mostly Earth-bound servant of Hell, reimagined the Heap as a bum named Eddie Beckett. Beckett was murdered after finding a bag of necroplasm, a supernatural substance of which Spawn's body is composed. The necroplasm reacted with his body, causing the earth and trash around him to collect and meld with his corpse. The Heap fought Spawn on at least two occasions, each time swallowing and engulfing Spawn and sending him to the mysterious Greenworld, an other-dimensional representation of nature. This version of the Heap debuted in Spawn #72.

==== In Other Media ====
The Image version of Heap appears in Diablo Immortal as a special boss for the Spawn Collab.

== See also ==
- "It!"
- Glob
- Muckman
- Man-Thing
- Sludge
- Swamp Thing
