= Zen the Intergalactic Ninja =

- Cover of Zen the Intergalactic Ninja #1 published by Archie Comics

Publication information
- Publisher: Zen Comics Publishing, Archie Comics, Entity Comics, Devil's Due
- First appearance: Zen, Intergalactic Ninja #1 (1987)
- Created by: Stephen L. Stern and Dan Cote

In-story information
- Species: Baltoonian
- Place of origin: Baltoon
- Abilities: Skilled martial artist

Zen the Intergalactic Ninja is a fictional character created in 1987 by Steve Stern and Dan Cote, and initially published under their Zen Comics imprint. In the early nineties Zen was licensed to Archie Comics, and then to Entity Comics.

== Publication history ==
After conceiving the initial pitch in 1970, Stern further developed Zen as a way of breaking from the archetypes of aliens as either malevolent or destructive entities as depicted in The War of the Worlds and Alien or as "wimpy" or ineffectual as seen in E.T. the Extra-Terrestrial and ALF (with Stern dismissing exceptions like Superman due to their humanoid appearance), instead portraying Zen as an extraterrestrial Dirty Harry. Stern stated he named the character Zen because he believes that branch of Buddhism offers valuable guidance on day-to-day living, with Zen imparting these lessons to his Earth companion Jeremy who thereby develops confidence and self-assurance.

Steve Stern moved to Auburn, Maine in the 1980s to work in advertising after previously writing for Skywald Publications' horror anthology magazines like Nightmare and Psycho A meeting with an advertising client led to Stern meeting with commercial artist Dan Cote, and after talking the two discovered they shared a mutual love of comic books. Cote suggested the two work on a comic together with Stern sharing the fifteen year old one page Zen pitch he'd written about "an alien floating in space" that he'd recently uncovered in his personal effects. Issue No. 1 of Zen Intergalactic Ninja came out in November 1987, selling 3-4,000 copies, and gained popularity over the course of two years to 20,000 copies per issue until a story in USA Today covering the character led to a glut of interest in the character and deals with Konami, Just Toys, and Archie Comics. Stern and Cote continued to publish Zen on a bimonthly basis as a side occupation from their jobs.

Zen has been depicted by many well-known comics artists, including Paul Pelletier, Mike Mignola, and Sam Kieth, as well as silver age artists Ross Andru and Mike Esposito. Other artists who have drawn Zen include Jae Lee, Frank Brunner, and Bill Maus. The first appearance of Zen's new look was in Entity Comic's Zen #0, published in 1993, which was written and drawn by Bill Maus. The characters look and design was also updated by Bill Maus from the kid-friendly Archie Comics look to the more modern comics version that you see today and from every other artist since. Dramatic sales on the book kept Bill Maus on the series for multiple issues afterwards, including his run on Alternity, The Hunted, Starquest and Young Zen.

Alien Hero is a collection of novellas and short stories about Zen, written by Steve Stern. Zen has also appeared in magazines as varied as Mixx, published by Tokyopop, and Heavy Metal.

In 2008, a new series of Zen trade paperbacks was to be launched by publisher Devil's Due. In addition, Devil's Due has announced an all-new continuing Zen comic-book series, written by fan favorite Joe Casey and illustrated by Joe Abraham. Devil's Due published only the first book in limited amounts. When the creators refused to surrender shares in their IP, Devil's Due discontinued the project. First Comics stepped up in 2010 publishing a full immersion 3D comic. Artist/creator Dan Cote retro-fitted his Earth day annual original pen and ink book into anaglyph 3D (red/blue, readable only with anaglyph red/blue glasses). First comics published "the best of zen" in 2012. A compilation of stories including full color version of book 1, (originally published in airbrushed black and white), and ending with a short story never before published in the current digital rendering style Cote devised using a combination of 80% Adobe Illustrator and 20% Photoshop. Sandwiched in between are stories by noted contributors throughout Zen's publishing history.

== Fictional character biography ==
Zen is a native of the planet Baltoon, where he was raised in a test tube as part of a genetic experiment. When the scientists in charge decided the test was a failure, they scheduled the infant Zen for termination. He was saved by Teslah, a scientist on the project, who fired the infant into space in a transport pod. Zen landed in the Om system, where he was found by the mysterious Masters of Om. They raised him as an acolyte, and trained him in the martial arts. Once grown, Zen became one of the finest martial artists the Omnians had known. Zen uses his skill as a mercenary, hiring himself out to the highest bidder.

== Powers and abilities ==
Zen is a skilled martial artist, trained in the ways of the Masters of Om. He is a master fighter, and knowledgeable in all forms of hand-to-hand combat.

Zen communicates through a unique type of telepathy that nobody fully understands. He is able to "talk" into others' heads, allowing them to hear him as though he were simply speaking out loud. When spoken to, he "hears" others through a combination of sound waves and thought patterns that he takes in as language and sound. Zen has an amazing awareness of his surroundings thanks to the fact that he "hears" with his mind more than ordinary people could take in with just their ears. However, Zen’s ability to "read thoughts" is not unlimited; one has to be deliberately "projecting" or transmitting one's thoughts in order for him to be able to receive them—so, if one can clear one's mind, one might be able to keep him in the dark.

Zen's other mental abilities allow him to dematerialize food with his mind in order to eat, to communicate telepathically with his mentors on distant planets, and to telekinetically move objects through the air (including his own body, allowing him to hover while he meditates).

== Merchandise ==
Mark Freedman of Surge Licensing, who'd been responsible for successfully franchising Teenage Mutant Ninja Turtles, acquired the licensing rights to Zen the Intergalactic Ninja hoping to repeat the success.

=== Action figures ===
Toyline for Zen the Intergalactic Ninja consisting of vehicles top from left: Hypership and The Contaminator and figures bottom from left Jeremy Baker, Can-It, Lights Out, Zen, Lord Contaminus, and Garbage Man

In addition to the video games, Zen was licensed for numerous products, including a set of action figures from the Just Toys company. The figures consisted of:

- Zen
- Jeremy Baker
- Can-it
- Lights Out
- Lord Contaminous
- Garbage Man
- Smogger

Additionally, two vehicles the Hypership and Contaminator were also produced.

=== Other ===
Other licensed products include posters from the Starmakers company, phone cards from Patco, chromium cards from Maxx, and a vinyl model kit from Inteleg International.

== Other media ==
Cover art for the NES version of the Konami produced video game

=== Film ===
In February 1992, it was reported both a feature film and animated TV series based on Zen were in development.

In December 1994, Brian Yuzna was set to direct a $6 million Zen the Intergalactic Ninja movie for Sceneries Entertainment and producer Philippe Diaz from a script by Chris Solimine. In June 1998, it was reported that filming on Zen the Intergalactic Ninja would take place during Summer of that year with CinéGroupe having since joined as a producer on the film, which was targeting a 1999 release date. In January 2002, Sceneries ceased operation with the film left unproduced.

=== Video game ===
An NES version was also released.

=== Animated series ===
In addition to the feature film, a 26 episode animated series produced by Ellipse Animation and Enoki Films was announced but ultimately dropped.
