= Hell-Rider =

Two-issue comic book series

- Hell-Rider #1 (Aug. 1971). Painted cover by Harry Rosenbaum.

Publication information
- Publisher: Skywald Publications
- First appearance: Hell-Rider #1 (Aug. 1971)
- Created by: Gary Friedrich, Ross Andru, and Mike Esposito
Hell-Rider
Publication information
- Schedule: Bimonthly
- Format: Ongoing series
- Publication date: Aug. – Oct. 1971
- No. of issues: 2
- Main character: Hell-Rider
Creative team
- Written by: Gary Friedrich
- Penciller: Ross Andru
- Inker: Mike Esposito
- Editor(s): Gary Friedrich; Sol Brodsky

Hell-Rider is a short-lived, black-and-white comics magazine published by Skywald Publications, a 1970s company best known for its horror comics magazines Nightmare, Psycho, and Scream. Like them and the similar publications of Warren Publishing, these were mature-audience magazines not covered by comic books' Comics Code Authority. Its cover price was 60¢, typical for that format and time, during which standard comic books sold for 15¢.

== Publication history ==
=== Main feature ===
Lasting two 64-page issues, Hell-Rider (cover-dated Aug. & Oct. 1971) starred the titular vigilante motorcyclist, a Vietnam War veteran, lawyer, and black belt martial artist named Brick Reese. With his customized, flamethrower-equipped motorcycle, and intermittent super-strength courtesy of the experimental drug Q-47, the Los Angeles, California-based Hell-Rider battled the Claw, a masked, heroin-smuggling, secret society leader in issue #1, and a bestial rampager called the Ripper in issue #2. The stories featured scantily clad rock starlets, nightclub waitresses, and groovy, pot-smoking 1970s chicks all quickly losing what little clothing they wore.

The series was created by Gary Friedrich, who would go on to co-create the better-known, Marvel Comics supernatural motorcyclist Ghost Rider, and illustrated by the veteran team of penciler Ross Andru and inker Mike Esposito. Skywald partners Sol Brodsky and Israel Waldman are listed as publishers, with Brodsky additionally credited as editor. Gary Friedrich is listed as "script editor", while Golden Age great Bill Everett, creator of the Sub-Mariner in 1939, has an unexplained credit for "special effects", which Al Hewetson, an editor of other Skywald titles, said in 2004 "probably refers to art corrections, assists and/or character designs."

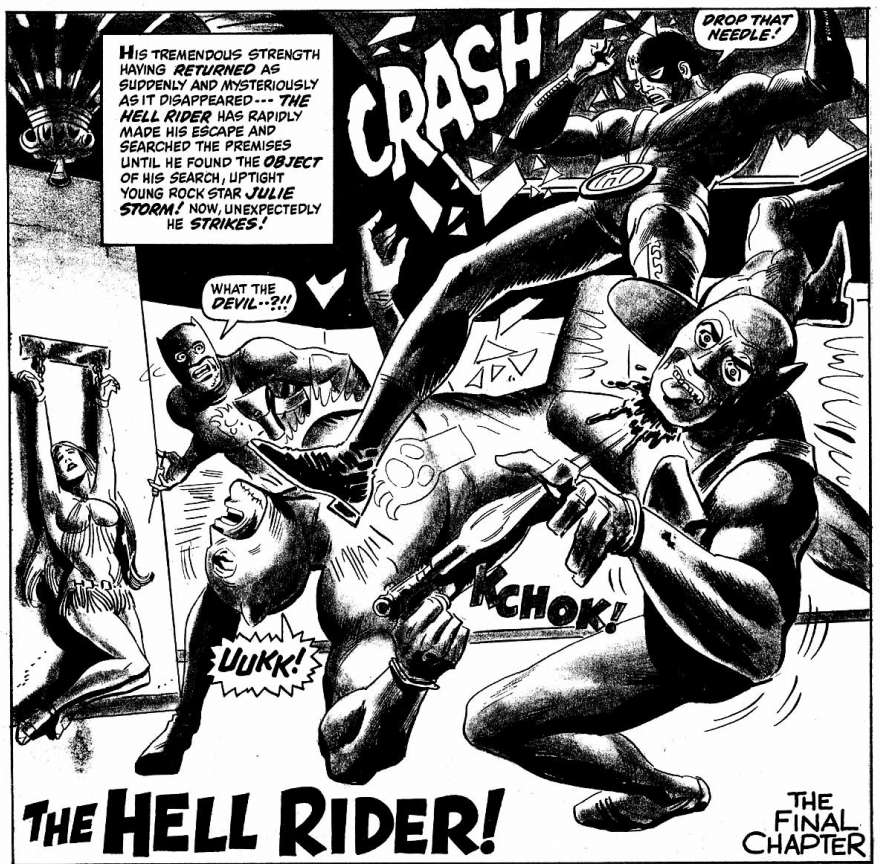
Panel from Hell-Rider #1, art by Ross Andru and Mike Esposito. The blood-spewing violence was graphic for the time.

The title character's name is sometimes spelled "Hell Rider", without a hyphen, in the stories.

A house ad for the never-published Hell-Rider #3, with cover art by Gray Morrow for a story titled "The Zodiac Killers", appeared as the back cover of Skywald's Psycho #5 (Nov. 1971).

=== Backup features ===
The magazine's backup features, whose stories were interrelated with those of the main feature, were "The Butterfly" and "The Wild Bunch", both written by Friedrich.

The former starred African-American singer/superheroine Marian Michaels, whose costume is equipped with bright lights to blind adversaries, a jet pack for flying, and suction cups for climbing. The latter starred a rough but basically goodhearted biker gang that Reese had encountered, consisting of leader Animal; Afro-haired Deke; weaselly Slinker; tall, blond Curly; and blond biker-babe Ruby.

Art credits for the first issue's backups are disputed, with sources suggesting either John Celardo and Rich Buckler as the "Butterfly" penciler, and either Dick Ayers or Syd Shores as the "Wild Bunch" penciler. The second issue's "Butterfly" story is credited to penciler-inker Buckler, and its "Wild Bunch" story to Shores and inker Esposito,

The magazine also included a motorcycle-related Q&A and advice column, "Curly's Cycle Corner", also written by Friedrich.
