= Pandora Pann =

- Pandora Pann, promo art from The Comic Reader #201, artist Ross Andru.

Publication information
- Publisher: DC Comics
- First appearance: The Comic Reader #197 (December 1981)
- Created by: Len Wein (writer); Ross Andru (artist)

In-story information
- Abilities: Trained archaeologist

Pandora Pann is a fictional comic book character owned by DC Comics. Pandora debuted in The Comic Reader #197 (December 1981) and was created by Len Wein and Ross Andru. Pandora Pann is based on the Greek myth of Pandora the first woman, as related by the poet Hesiod in his epic poem, the Theogony (700 BCE).

== Publication history ==
The character was originally slated for a September 1982 publication date by DC Comics. Len Wein and Ross Andru's Pandora Pann was described in The Comic Reader #197 (December 1981) as "the assistant of an archaeologist who unwittingly opens Pandora's box and spends the rest of her time trying to retrieve the evil she has unleashed by doing so".

Pandora Pann was originally scheduled to debut as a backup preview in The Saga of the Swamp Thing #5 (September 1982). Promotional art from the preview debuted in The Comic Reader #201 (April 1982). According to an interview in The Comic Reader #202 (May 1982), the series was instead put on indefinite hiatus "due to Len Wein's inability to find the time to write it". Launched instead was Arion, Lord of Atlantis, which had run for several months as a backup feature in The Warlord.

When Bob Rozakis asked him about the character, Len Wein responded with:

Even I had forgotten about Pandora Pann. The answer is that Ross Andru penciled most of a terrific-looking 15 page insert to be included in Swamp Thing, before going off into her own book. But for reasons sadly lost to history (meaning, for the life of me, I can no longer remember why), we never went ahead with the series. A shame too, since it would have preceded things like Tomb Raider and Relic Hunter by decades. And there you have another Secret Behind the Comics. --Len Wein

== See also ==
- DC Comics insert previews
- List of comics solicited but never published
