= Jack Abel =

American comic book artist

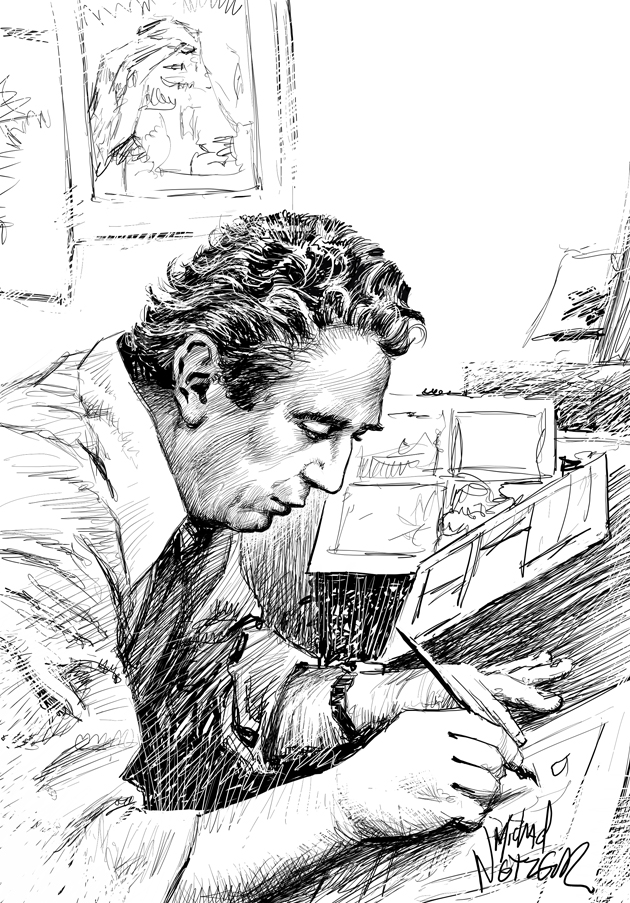
- Jack Abel by Michael Netzer
- Born: July 15, 1927
- Died: March 6, 1996 (aged 68)
- Areas: Penciller, Inker
- Pseudonym: Gary Michaels
- Notable works: Superman
- Awards: Inkwell Awards Joe Sinnott Hall of Fame Award 2026

Jack Abel (July 15, 1927 – March 6, 1996) was an American comic book artist best known as an inker for leading publishers DC Comics and Marvel Comics. He was DC's primary inker on the Superman titles in the late 1960s and early 1970s, and inked penciler Herb Trimpe's introduction of the popular superhero Wolverine in The Incredible Hulk #181 (Nov. 1974). He sometimes used the pseudonym Gary Michaels.

== Biography ==
=== Early life and career ===
Abel's published work stretches to 1951, when he penciled and inked horror stories for such anthology series as Mr. Publications' (Mike Esposito and Ross Andru's company) Mister Mystery, and Atlas Comics'—the 1950s forerunner of Marvel Comics—Journey into Unknown Worlds, and Western tales in Prize Comics' aptly title Prize Comics Western. He inked science fiction, romance, and war comics for Atlas, American Comics Group, Avon Comics, Harvey Comics, and Hillman Periodicals, and later in the decade became a prolific penciler for the DC war titles All-American Men of War, Our Army at War, Our Fighting Forces, and Star Spangled War Stories.

Writer Hank Chapman and Abel co-created the character Sgt. Mule – whose name, "Millie", meant she was actually not a mule (male) but a hinny (female) — appeared with various keepers including Private Mulvaney (Our Army at War #149 and 160, Star Spangled War Stories #136); Private Skinner (G.I. Combat #104); and Private Smith (Our Army at War #117).

Roy Lichtenstein recomposed a panel from a story written by Bob Haney and illustrated by Abel in Star Spangled War Stories #102 (April–May 1962) for his 1963 pop art lithograph Crak!. Similarly, Torpedo...Los! is based on Abel's art in the Haney-written story "Battle of the Ghost Ships?", in Our Fighting Forces #71 (October 1962).

=== DC and Superman ===
Abel inked hundreds of DC stories, and eventually was chosen to succeed longtime "Superman family" inker George Klein as Curt Swan's embellisher on "Legion of Super-Heroes" in Adventure Comics (most issues, #369–380, June 1968–May 1969); Superman (most issues, #208–219, July 1968–Aug. 1969); "Superman" in Action Comics (#368–379, Oct. 1968–Aug. 1969), and occasional issues of Superboy.

=== Later career ===
After a reshuffling at DC c. 1970, Abel went to Marvel. He had already inked Gene Colan there on a long stretch of Iron Man stories beginning with Tales of Suspense #73 (Jan. 1966), under the pseudonym "Gary Michaels". As Colan recalled, "He did a lot of Iron Man with me. He had a very slick line, which was okay on Iron Man, of course. Iron Man was made of iron, so you want it to look like metal. But when it came to stone and dark corners and garbage [laughs], he wasn't the man for that".

Later, under his own name, he would embellish Colan on some issues of Daredevil and The Tomb of Dracula (including the introduction of Blade, in #10); Trimpe on The Incredible Hulk; George Tuska on Iron Man; and Paul Gulacy on Master of Kung Fu, among other work.

From the mid-1970s, Abel inked not only for Marvel and again DC (including its Teen Titans and The Flash), but for the smaller companies Gold Key (Boris Karloff Tales of Mystery, Grimm's Ghost Stories, Mighty Samson, the licensed title The Twilight Zone); Charlton Comics (Ghost Manor, Ghostly Haunts, Haunted, Midnight Tales); Atlas/Seaboard Comics (IronJaw, Morlock 2001); and Skywald Publications (The Heap, and additionally the black-and-white horror comics magazines Nightmare and Psycho). The character Cinnamon was introduced in Weird Western Tales #48 (Sept.–Oct. 1978) by writer Roger McKenzie and Abel.

Baseball-fan Abel, who in the 1970s rented studio space at Neal Adams and Dick Giordano's Continuity Associates, organized the Continuity softball team that played league games in Central Park.

After suffering a serious stroke in 1981, Abel rehabilitated his paralyzed right hand to the extent that he was able to ink and draw again—which he did through the rest of the 1980s, primarily for Marvel.

=== Comic strips ===
Outside comic books, Abel inked John Celardo from 1967–1969 on the syndicated comic strip Tales of the Green Beret, written by Robin Moore.

== Awards ==
In 2016, Abel was nominated and tied for runner-up for the Inkwell Awards Special Recognition Award. In 2026, he was inducted into the Inkwell Awards Joe Sinnott Hall of Fame.

== Bibliography ==
=== Archie Comics ===
- Red Circle Sorcery #10–11 (1974–1975)

=== Atlas/Seaboard Comics ===
- Brute #3 (1975)
- Ironjaw #1 (1975)
- Morlock 2001 #1–2 (1975)
- Western Action #1 (1975)

=== Charlton Comics ===
- Fightin' Army #70 (1966)
- Haunted #10 (1973)

=== DC Comics ===
- Action Comics #368–372, 374–379 (Superman); #380–387, 389–392 (Legion of Super-Heroes) (1968–1970)
- Adventure Comics #369–372, 377–380 (Legion of Super-Heroes); #381, 384-388, 391–398, 400–402, 404, 406 (Supergirl); #456–458 (Superboy); #459–462 (Wonder Woman) (1968–1979)
- All-American Men of War #25–27, 30–31, 33–36, 40, 42, 44–46, #48–49, 51, 53, 57, 60, 66, 68–70, 73–76, 78–81, 83–88, 91–93, 95–96, 99–100, 104–105 (1955–1964)
- Batman #208, 303 (1969–1978)
- The Brave and the Bold #76 (Batman and Plastic Man) (1968)
- Capt. Storm #2, 8–11, 15–16 (1964–1966)
- Challengers of the Unknown #63 (1968)
- DC Comics Presents #9–10 (1979)
- DC Special Series #1 (Aquaman) (1977)
- DC Super Stars #14 (Doctor Light) (1977)
- Detective Comics #486 (Robin) (1979)
- Falling in Love #10–11, 96 (1957–1968)
- Firestorm #4 (1978)
- The Flash #271 (1979)
- Freedom Fighters #7–11, 13–15 (1977–1978)
- Ghosts #73 (1979)
- G.I. Combat #49–50, 53, 57–61, 63, 65, 67, 69, 71, 73–75, 78–84, 86, 88–90, 92–93, 95–96, 98–101, 103–106, 109, 111–112, 114–118, 122, 126–127, 129, 131–132 (1957–1968)
- Girls' Love Stories #177 (1973)
- House of Mystery #252–254, 272 (1977–1979)
- House of Secrets #84, 93, 96 (1970–1972)
- Kamandi #46 (1976)
- Karate Kid #10 (1977)
- Love Stories #149 (1973)
- Men of War #15 (1979)
- Our Army at War #42, 45–47, 49–50, 53–54, 56–59, 61–66, 68, 72–75, 77–80, 84, 86, 88–90, 92, 94–95, 97–103, 105, 107–119, 123, 125, 129–131, 136–139, 142–143, 145–146, 149, 156, 160, 163, 165–166, 168, 170, 178–181, 185, 187–189, 191–192, 194, 197 (1956–1968)
- Our Fighting Forces #8, 14–15, 19, 23, 26, 29–32, 34–41, 48, 50–52, 54, 57–59, 61–63, 65–72, 79–82, 84–94, 96, 98–103, 105–113 (1955–1968)
- Richard Dragon, Kung-Fu Fighter #10–12 (1976)
- Sea Devils #14 (1963)
- Secret Hearts #131, 150 (1968–1971)
- Secret Society of Super Villains #10 (1977)
- Showcase #89–90 (Jason's Quest) (1970)
- Star Spangled War Stories #43–44, 52, 56, 58, 60, 62–63, 65, 67–69, 71–73, 75, 77–86, 88, 91–96, 99–102, 104–107, 109–110, 112, 114–115, 117–120, 122–126, 128, 130–131, 134, 136, 166 (1956–1972)
- Superboy #148, 150–151, 226–232, 234, 237, 243, 247, 249 (1968–1979)
- Superman #208–209, 211, 213–215, 218–219 (1968–1969)
- The Superman Family #187–190 (1978)
- Superman's Pal Jimmy Olsen #108, 121 (1968–1969)
- Super-Team Family #8–10 (Challengers of the Unknown) (1977)
- Tales of the Unexpected #103–104 (1967–1968)
- Teen Titans #8 (1967)
- The Unexpected #115, 200 (1969–1980)
- Weird Mystery Tales #1–3 (1972)
- Weird Western Tales #48 (Cinnamon) (1978)
- The Witching Hour #7, 9, 26, 80 (1970–1978)
- Wonder Woman #177 (1968)
- World's Finest Comics #174, 178, 184, 251–252 (1968–1978)
- Young Love #95, 125 (1972–1977)
- Young Romance #189 (1972)

=== Marvel Comics ===
- 3-D Tales of the West #1 (1954)
- Adventure into Fear #20, 24 (Morbius) (1974)
- Adventures into Terror #11, 22–24, 27 (1952–1954)
- Adventures into Weird Worlds #12, 16–19, 24, 27 (1952–1954)
- Amazing Adventures #24, 27, 30, 35, 37 (Killraven) (1974–1976)
- Amazing Detective Cases #14 (1952)
- Apache Kid #16 (1955)
- Astonishing #15, 21, 39, 54, 63 (1952–1957)
- Astonishing Tales #19 (Ka-Zar) (1973)
- The Avengers #195–196, Annual #9, 11 (1979–1982)
- Battle #20, 27, 40, 43, 48 (1953–1956)
- Battle Action #18–21, 25–26 (1955–1956)
- Battlefield #10 (1953)
- Battlefront #12, 30–31, 34–36 (1953–1955)
- Battleground #8, 10, 16 (1955–1956)
- Captain America #235, 291 (1979–1984)
- Captain Marvel #34 (1974)
- Caught #1, 4 (1956–1957)
- Chamber of Chills #7 (1973)
- Combat #10–11 (1953)
- Combat Casey #11–14 (1953–1954)
- Conan the King #20 (1984)
- Cowboy Action #8 (1955)
- Daredevil #81–82 (1971)
- The Deadly Hands of Kung Fu #8–9, 11, 13, 17, 19–21 (1975–1976)
- The Defenders #12, 25, 30, 71, 81, 102, 106, 117, 119–121 (1974–1983)
- Doc Savage #8 (1974)
- Frankenstein #13 (1974)
- Frontier Western #1, 3, 6 (1956)
- The Further Adventures of Indiana Jones #19, 21 (1984)
- Ghost Rider vol. 2 #7 (1974)
- Giant-Size Chillers #2 (1975)
- Giant-Size Master of Kung-Fu #2 (1974)
- G.I. Joe: A Real American Hero #1–4, 6 (1982)
- G.I. Tales #6 (1957)
- Girl Confessions #31 (1954)
- Godzilla, King of the Monsters #22 (1979)
- Gunhawks #2–5 (1972–1973)
- The Incredible Hulk #167–172, 174–181, 234, 237–238, Annual #5 (1973–1979)
- Iron Man #82, 90, 92–94, 96, Annual #3 (1976–1977)
- Journey into Mystery #7, 10, 14, 20 (1953–1954)
- Journey into Unknown Worlds #5, 23, 33–34, 39, 42, 46–47 (1951–1956)
- Justice #49 (1954)
- Ka-Zar vol. 2 #2, 14 (1974–1976)
- Kull the Destroyer #14 (1974)
- Lovers #58 (1954)
- Man-Thing #3–4 (1974)
- Marines at War #6 (1957)
- Marines in Action #1–2, 7 (1955–1956)
- Marines in Battle #6–15 (1955–1956)
- Marvel Comics Presents #68, 70 (1990–1991)
- Marvel Fanfare #11, 51 (1983–1990)
- Marvel Romance Redux: Guys & Dolls #1 (2006)
- Marvel Super Heroes Secret Wars #8 (1984)
- Marvel Tales #110–111, 116, 137, 143–144, 152 (1952–1956)
- Marvel Team-Up Annual #2 (1979)
- Marvel Two-in-One #11 (1975)
- Master of Kung Fu #43–44, 48, 109–11 (1976–1982)
- Men's Adventures #19 (1953)
- My Love #16–18 (1972)
- Mystery Tales #5 10, 15, 22–23, 28, 36, 42–43, 45 (1952–1956)
- Mystic #15, 18, 29–30, 40, 46 (1952–1956)
- Mystical Tales #2–4 (1956)
- Navy Action #6, 10 (1955–1956)
- Navy Combat #4 (1955)
- Our Love Story #15–18 (1972)
- Quick Trigger Action #12 (1956)
- Red Wolf #6–7 (1973)
- Ringo Kid #6–7 (1955)
- Rugged Action #4 (1955)
- Secret Story Romances #4 (1954)
- Shogun Warriors #9, 11 (1979)
- Solo Avengers #16 (1989)
- Spaceman #2, 4 (1953–1954)
- The Spectacular Spider-Man #101 (1985)
- Spellbound #10, 13, 16, 22, 24, 27, 29, 31 (1952–1956)
- Strange Stories of Suspense #12 (1956)
- Strange Stories of the Unusual #7 (1956)
- Strange Tales #22, 25, 38, 43, 45, 48 (1953–1956)
- Strange Tales of the Unusual #4 (1956)
- Super-Villain Classics #1 (Galactus) (1983)
- Super-Villain Team-Up #3, 6 (1975–1976)
- Supernatural Thrillers #6 (1973)
- Tales of Justice #54, 58, 60 (1955–1956)
- Tales of Suspense #73–81, 83 (Iron Man) (1966)
- Thor #325 (1982)
- The Tomb of Dracula #10–11 (1973)
- Two Gun Western #5–6 (1956)
- Uncanny Tales #11, 21, 28, 35, 37 (1953–1955)
- The Vision and the Scarlet Witch vol. 2 #5 (1986)
- War Adventures #13 (1953)
- War Comics #25, 37–38, 43 (1954–1956)
- Web of Spider-Man #30 (1987)
- Western Kid #5, 11 (1955–1956)
- Western Outlaws #2, 21 (1954–1957)
- Western Outlaws and Sheriffs #72 (1952)
- Western Trails #1 (1957)
- What If...? #32, 43 (1982–1984)
- Wild Western #32 (1954)
- World of Fantasy #1–3, 11 (1956–1958)
- World of Suspense #3–4 (1956)
- Wyatt Earp #1 (1955)

=== Prize Comics ===
- Headline Comics #50–51 (1951–1952)

=== Skywald Publications ===
- Heap #1 (1971)
- Nightmare #4–6 (1971)

=== Tower Comics ===
- T.H.U.N.D.E.R. Agents #16 (1967)

Preceded by Mike Esposito	"Iron Man" feature in Tales of Suspense inker 1966	Succeeded by Frank Giacoia
Preceded by Al Plastino	Superman inker 1968–1969	Succeeded by George Roussos
Preceded by George Klein	"Superman" feature in Action Comics inker 1968–1969	Succeeded by George Roussos
Preceded by Sal Trapani	The Incredible Hulk inker 1973–1974	Succeeded by Herb Trimpe
