= DC Comics insert previews =

Set of comic book inserts

First page of The New Teen Titans insert preview, from DC Comics Presents #26 (Oct. 1980), art by George Pérez and Dick Giordano.

DC Comics insert previews were 16-page comic book stories inserted into issues of existing DC Comics series to promote new series usually debuting the next month. Running from 1980 to 1985, they consisted of a front cover, 14 pages of story, and a back cover that depicted the cover of the actual first issue. The addition of the insert did not entail an increase in the price of the comic book, and the cover copy called the insert "a special free 16-page comic!"

== Publication history ==
The insert previews began with The New Teen Titans in DC Comics Presents #26 (Oct. 1980). This reboot of an existing property by writer Marv Wolfman and artist George Pérez introduced several new characters and would become a sales success for DC. Wolfman would additionally write previews for a reboot of the "Dial H for Hero" feature and for Night Force a supernatural series drawn by Gene Colan, his former collaborator on The Tomb of Dracula. DC highlighted the work of Roy Thomas, newly arrived at the company from Marvel Comics, by featuring several of his series in the format. These included All-Star Squadron, a revival of the Justice Society of America; Arak, Son of Thunder, a new Native American character; a revitalization of Wonder Woman including an update of the character's costume; and Captain Carrot and His Amazing Zoo Crew! a combination of the talking animal and superhero genres. When the long running The Brave and the Bold series came to its conclusion, the final issue featured a preview of a new Batman series, Batman and the Outsiders by writer Mike W. Barr and artist Jim Aparo, which would be described by DC Comics writer and executive Paul Levitz as being "a team series more fashionable to 1980s audiences". New talent such as the writing team of Dan Mishkin and Gary Cohn was represented in the previews with Amethyst, Princess of Gemworld and Blue Devil. Licensed properties were featured as well. A Masters of the Universe preview featured in several comic books cover dated November 1982 led to a miniseries the following month. The Atari Force preview in January 1983 served as a prequel to the ongoing series launched a year later. M.A.S.K. was an animated series and a Kenner Products toyline adapted into comic books in a September 1985 preview which led to a miniseries the following December.

== Issues ==
Issue (cover date)	Insert preview	Writer(s)	Artist(s)	Citations
DC Comics Presents #26 (October 1980)	The New Teen Titans	Marv Wolfman	George Pérez and Dick Giordano	
Legion of Super-Heroes vol. 2 #272 (February 1981)	"Dial H for Hero" (Note: "Dial 'H' for Hero" appeared in Adventure Comics rather than in its own title.)	Marv Wolfman	Carmine Infantino, Frank Chiaramonte, and Dennis Jensen	
Justice League of America #193 (August 1981)	All-Star Squadron	Roy Thomas	Rich Buckler and Jerry Ordway	
Warlord #48 (August 1981)	Arak, Son of Thunder	Roy Thomas	Ernie Colón and Tony DeZuniga	
DC Comics Presents #41 (January 1982)	Wonder Woman	Roy Thomas	Gene Colan and Romeo Tanghal	
The New Teen Titans #16 (February 1982)	Captain Carrot and His Amazing Zoo Crew!	Roy Thomas	Scott Shaw, Ross Andru, and Bob Smith	
The New Teen Titans #21 (July 1982)	Night Force	Marv Wolfman	Gene Colan and Bob Smith	
Action Comics #537; All-Star Squadron #15; Arak, Son of Thunder #15; Batman #353; Captain Carrot and His Amazing Zoo Crew #9; The Daring New Adventures of Supergirl #1; DC Comics Presents #51; Detective Comics #520; The Fury of Firestorm #6; Justice League of America #208; The Legion of Super-Heroes vol. 2 #293; The New Adventures of Superboy #35; The New Teen Titans #25; Superman #377; The Warlord #63; Wonder Woman #297 (all November 1982)	Masters of the Universe (Note: Masters of the Universe, Atari Force, and M.A.S.K. were licensed properties.)	Paul Kupperberg	Curt Swan and Dave Hunt	
DC Comics Presents #53; The New Teen Titans #27 (both January 1983)	Atari Force	Gerry Conway	Ross Andru and Dick Giordano	
The Legion of Super-Heroes vol. 2 #298 (April 1983)	Amethyst, Princess of Gemworld	Dan Mishkin and Gary Cohn	Ernie Colón	
The Brave and the Bold #200 (July 1983)	Batman and the Outsiders	Mike W. Barr	Jim Aparo	
The Fury of Firestorm #24 (June 1984)	Blue Devil	Dan Mishkin and Gary Cohn	Paris Cullins and Pablo Marcos	
Batman and the Outsiders #15; Blue Devil #6; Superman #401; Tales of the Legion of Super-Heroes #317; Tales of the Teen Titans #48; World's Finest Comics #309 (all November 1984)	Flash Force 2000 (Note: Flash Force 2000 was an advertising promotion for a Matchbox toyline rather than a preview of an upcoming DC Comics series. It is included here for completeness of the subject.)	Robert Loren Fleming	Denys Cowan and Sal Trapani	
Batman #387; Batman and the Outsiders #27; Blue Devil #16; Green Lantern #192; Justice League of America #242; Superman #411; Tales of the Legion of Super-Heroes #327; World's Finest Comics #319 (all September 1985)	M.A.S.K.	Michael Fleisher	Mike Chen and Joe Delbeato	

== Collected editions ==
The following insert preview stories have been reprinted in collected editions:

- The New Teen Titans story from DC Comics Presents #26 (October 1980) in:
  - The New Teen Titans Archives Vol. 1, 240 pages, February 1999, ISBN 978-1563894855
  - The New Teen Titans Omnibus Vol. 1, 684 pages, September 2011, ISBN 978-1401231088
  - The New Teen Titans Vol. 1, 240 pages, September 2014, ISBN 978-1401251437
- The All-Star Squadron story from Justice League of America #193 (August 1981) in:
  - Showcase Presents: All-Star Squadron Vol. 1, 528 pages, April 2012, ISBN 978-1401234362
  - Justice Society of America: A Celebration of 75 Years, 496 pages, July 2015, ISBN 978-1401255312
- The Wonder Woman story from DC Comics Presents #41 (January 1982) in:
  - Wonder Woman: 80 Years of the Amazon Warrior The Deluxe Edition, 416 pages, September 2021, ISBN 978-1779511577
- The Captain Carrot and His Amazing Zoo Crew story from The New Teen Titans #16 (February 1982) in:
  - Captain Carrot and the Final Ark, 168 pages, April 2008, ISBN 978-1401216849
  - Showcase Presents: Captain Carrot and His Amazing Zoo Crew, 672 pages, September 2014, ISBN 978-1401247560
- The Night Force story from The New Teen Titans #21 (July 1982) in:
  - Night Force by Marv Wolfman and Gene Colan: The Complete Series, 396 pages, October 2017, ISBN 978-1401274290
- The Masters of the Universe story from various DC Comics titles (November 1982) in:
  - DC Through the 80s: The End of Eras, 520 pages, December 2020, ISBN 978-1779500878
- The Amethyst, Princess of Gemworld story from Legion of Super-Heroes vol. 2 #298 (April 1983) in:
  - Showcase Presents: Amethyst, Princess of Gemworld Vol. 1, 648 pages, October 2012, ISBN 978-1401236779
- The Batman and the Outsiders story from The Brave and the Bold #200 (July 1983) in:
  - Showcase Presents: Batman and the Outsiders Vol. 1, 552 pages, September 2007, ISBN 978-1401215460
  - Batman and the Outsiders Vol. 1, 368 pages, February 2017, ISBN 978-1401268121

== See also ==
- DC Comics Bonus Book
- Pandora Pann
