= Ernie Schroeder =

American comic book artist (1916–2006)

- Born: Ernest C. Schroeder; January 9, 1916 Brooklyn, New York City, New York
- Died: September 20, 2006 (aged 90) Brevard County, Florida
- Area: Artist
- Notable works: The Heap

Ernest C. Schroeder (January 9, 1916 – September 20, 2006) was an American comic book artist, a commercial illustrator, and a sculptor, best known for drawing and co-writing Hillman Periodicals' influential muck-monster the Heap from 1949 to 1953.

Other characters with which Schroeder is associated include Hillman's Airboy and Harvey Comics' Shock Gibson and Spirit of '76.

== Biography ==
=== Early life and career ===
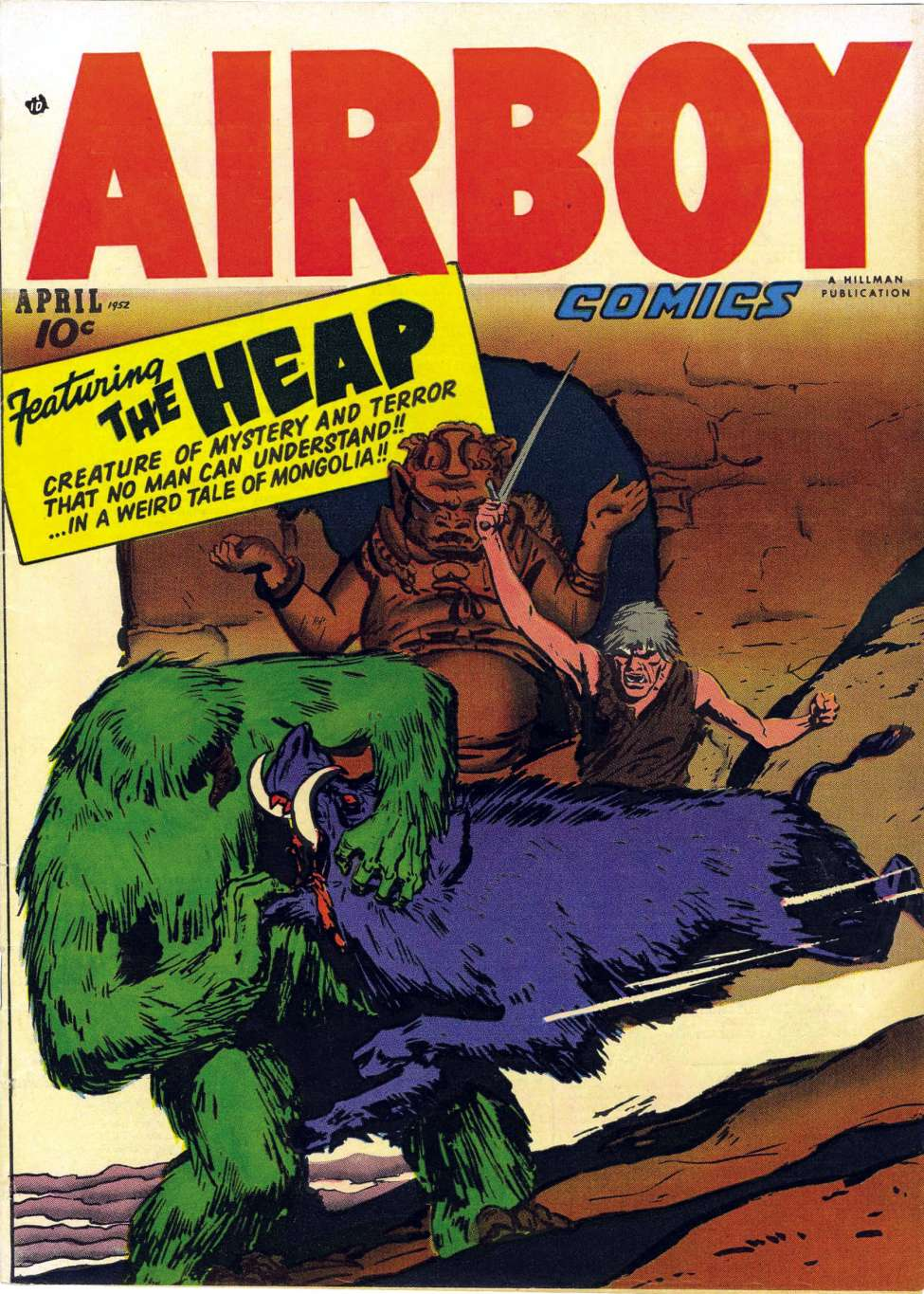
Airboy Comics vol. 9, #3 (April 1952), featuring the Heap. Cover art by Schroeder.

In a 2004 interview, Schroeder described a family life in which his future father was a West Point graduate and Spanish–American War veteran who after that conflict settled in the Philippine Islands, and who met Schroeder's future mother, the daughter of an amusement park owner, while on a visit to the United States. Schroeder said that upon marriage, the couple lived in the Philippines, where his mother worked as a hospital nurse; they later returned to the U.S., where his father played a Confederate officer in the D.W. Griffith film The Birth of a Nation, made a fortune with a New York City silver-polish company called Noxon, and sold Ford trucks in Brooklyn, New York City, New York, where Schroeder was born, before leaving the family when Schroeder was very young. The artist said he lived with his grandmother for a short time until his mother became resident nurse at the estate of Jesse Jay Ricks, president of the Union Carbide & Carbon Corporation, and that Schroeder then grew up in a wealthy household of four boys, where family guests included Carl Sandburg.

Schroeder later studied under George Bridgman and George Grosz at the Art Students League, in Manhattan. He joined the U.S. Merchant Marine in 1936. Leaving the service by 1939, Schroeder got married, had a child, and began working as a textile designer. As World War II was beginning, he began working in a machine shop, making tools for the Grumman Aircraft Engineering Corporation's PTB bomber. After meeting comic-book artist Bob Powell, Schroeder quit the machine shop to pursue art, but a month later was drafted into the infantry and stationed at Camp Blanding, near Jacksonville, Florida. There he drew for the camp newspaper, The Bayonet, and drew some of his first comic books; his earliest known confirmed credit is penciling and inking the 6-page story "Satan Rides the Waves" in Harvey Comics' All-New Comics #7 (cover-dated March 1944).

Black Knight #1 (May 1953). Cover art by Schroeder.

Later, while in California waiting to be shipped with the planned invasion forces to Japan, news came that the atomic bomb had been dropped, precipitating the end of the war. Schroeder, who had four children by then, was discharged from the service.

Schroeder eventually divorced his first wife, and remarried. He had children with both.

=== Airboy and the Heap ===
From 1946 to 1949, Schroeder drew and also occasionally wrote for Parents Magazine Press' non-fiction history series True Comics. Other work for that company included art for the comic books Bigbrain Billy, Calling All Boys, and Calling All Kids.

Introduced by Powell to Harvey Comics principals Alfred and Leon Harvey, Schroeder did uncredited art for such company characters as the Zebra, Shock Gibson and Spirit of '76. He then began a long stint at Hillman Periodicals, penciling and inking the adventures of aviator hero Airboy in Airboy Comics, from vol. 5, #11 (Dec. 1948) through the final issue, vol. 10, #4 (May 1953).

With vol. 6, #8 (Sept. 1949), Schroeder additionally began drawing the backup feature "The Heap", starring a shambling, elemental muck monster created by Mort Leav and Harry Stein in 1942, and which decades later served as an inspiration for DC Comics' Swamp Thing and Marvel Comics' Man-Thing. The feature ran through the final issue.

Herb Rogoff, an editor at Hillman and at Ziff-Davis, recalled in a 2004 interview that Schroeder "wrote a lot of his own stories on 'Airboy' and 'The Heap'. His spelling was atrocious and we had to straighten out some of his sentence structures, but he was very imaginative. He was just natively bright, and was a marvelous conceptualist. Ernie and [Hillman's comic-book editor-in-chief] Ed Cronin plotted stories together at lunch, and then Ernie would go home and write them. He and I worked the same way on G.I. Joe at Ziff-Davis."

=== Later comics career ===
When Hillman Periodicals ceased its comic-book line in 1953, Schroeder drew the single issue of Toby Press' medieval-adventure comic The Black Knight, and contributed to the company's anthology comic Tales of Horror. He did some work the following year for Prize Comics' Black Magic, under the celebrated writer-artist publishing team of Joe Simon and Jack Kirby. In 1955, Schroeder drew for the Ziff-Davis comic book G.I. Joe (unrelated to the toy line, which debuted the following decade). In 1961 and 1962, he contributed to Simon's satirical-humor magazine Sick.

Other 1950s comics work includes issues of Dell Comics' Captain Davey Jones, Health Publications' Panic, Harvey Comics' Alarming Tales, Pierce Publishing's Frantic, and Ziff-Davis' Buddies.

His last recorded comic-book credits are pencils and inks for two five-page, anthological fantasy stories in Harvey's Black Cat Mystic #62 (March 1958). At age 88, however, Schroeder painted Airboy and the Heap for the cover of the comics-history magazine Alter Ego #42 (Nov. 2004), and additional new sketches to accompany an interview with him.

=== Other careers ===
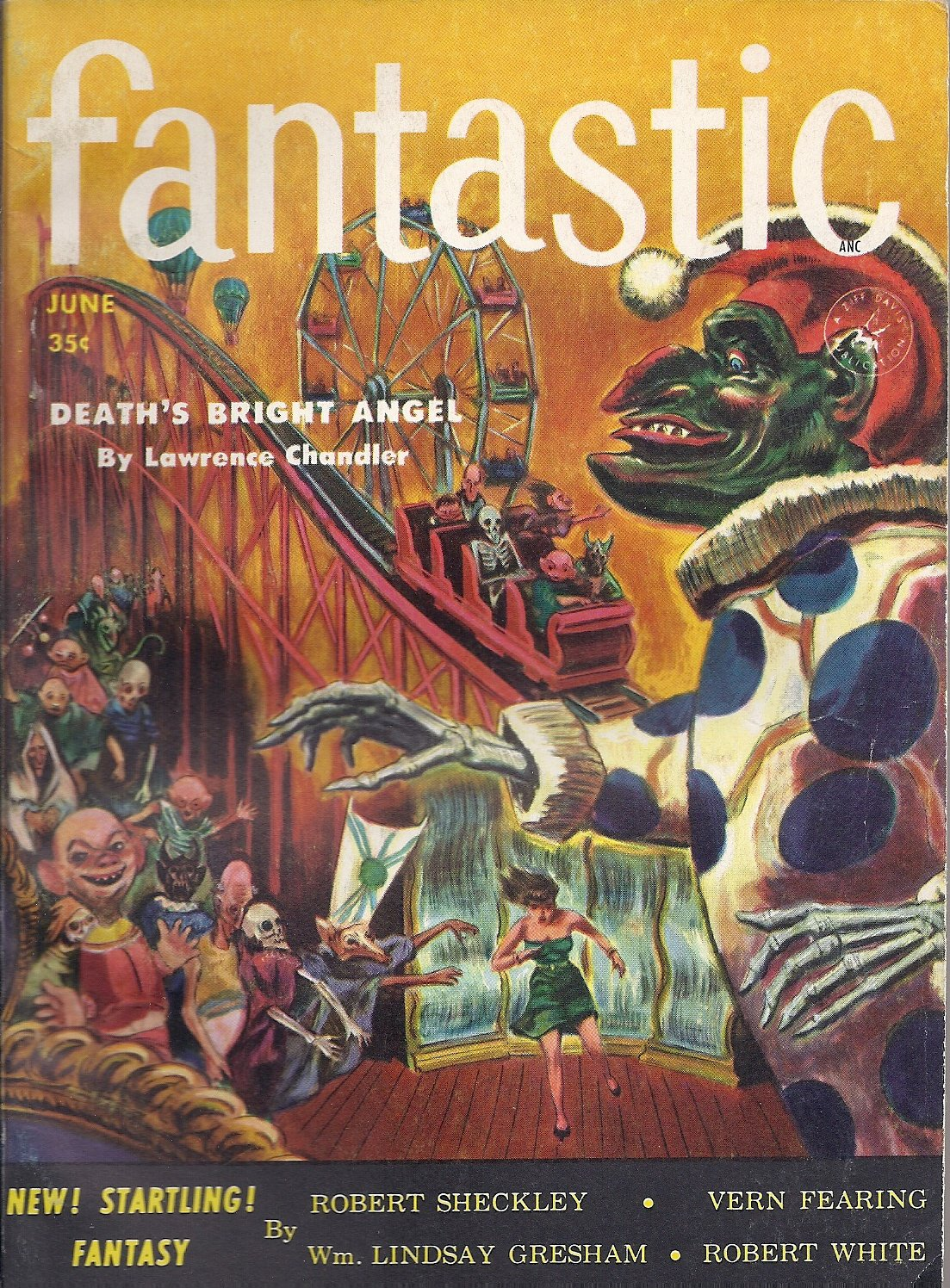
Fantastic vol. 3, #3 (June 1954). Cover art by Schroeder.

Schroeder segued to magazine and book illustration, providing artwork for short stories by Isaac Asimov, Doris E. Kaye and other writers. He additionally became a sketch artist for New York City advertising agencies, working on staff for a time at the firm Norman, Craig & Kummel.

Schroeder said in his 2004 interview that in the early 1960s, he followed an uncle into a boat-building business in the Sheepshead Bay section of Brooklyn, working at this for approximately 10 years. In the same interview, however, he says that after having "gone broke", he relocated his family to Seattle, Washington, in 1963. There he was later hired for the art department at the aircraft manufacturer Boeing, headquartered in a suburb. During his time with the company he also spent six months at its Vertol division in Ridley Park, a suburb of Philadelphia.

According to Schroeder he left Boeing in 1970 to become the chief sculptor of the Franklin Mint, located in the Philadelphia suburb of Aston Township. There he helped to design and produce commemorative coins. Leaving this position in 1979, he moved to Florida, where he freelanced for Franklin and other mints for approximately four years before retiring. His sculpture work afterward included a life-sized sabre-tooth cat model for a museum in Silver Spring, Maryland; he gave the model an articulated jaw that opened when viewers pressed a button on the floor. Schroeder also sculpted a bronze fountain in the public square of his town.

=== Later life ===
Schroeder was living in Brevard County, Florida, at the time of his death on September 20, 2006.
