= Spirit of '76 (Harvey Comics) =

Superhero in Harvey Comics

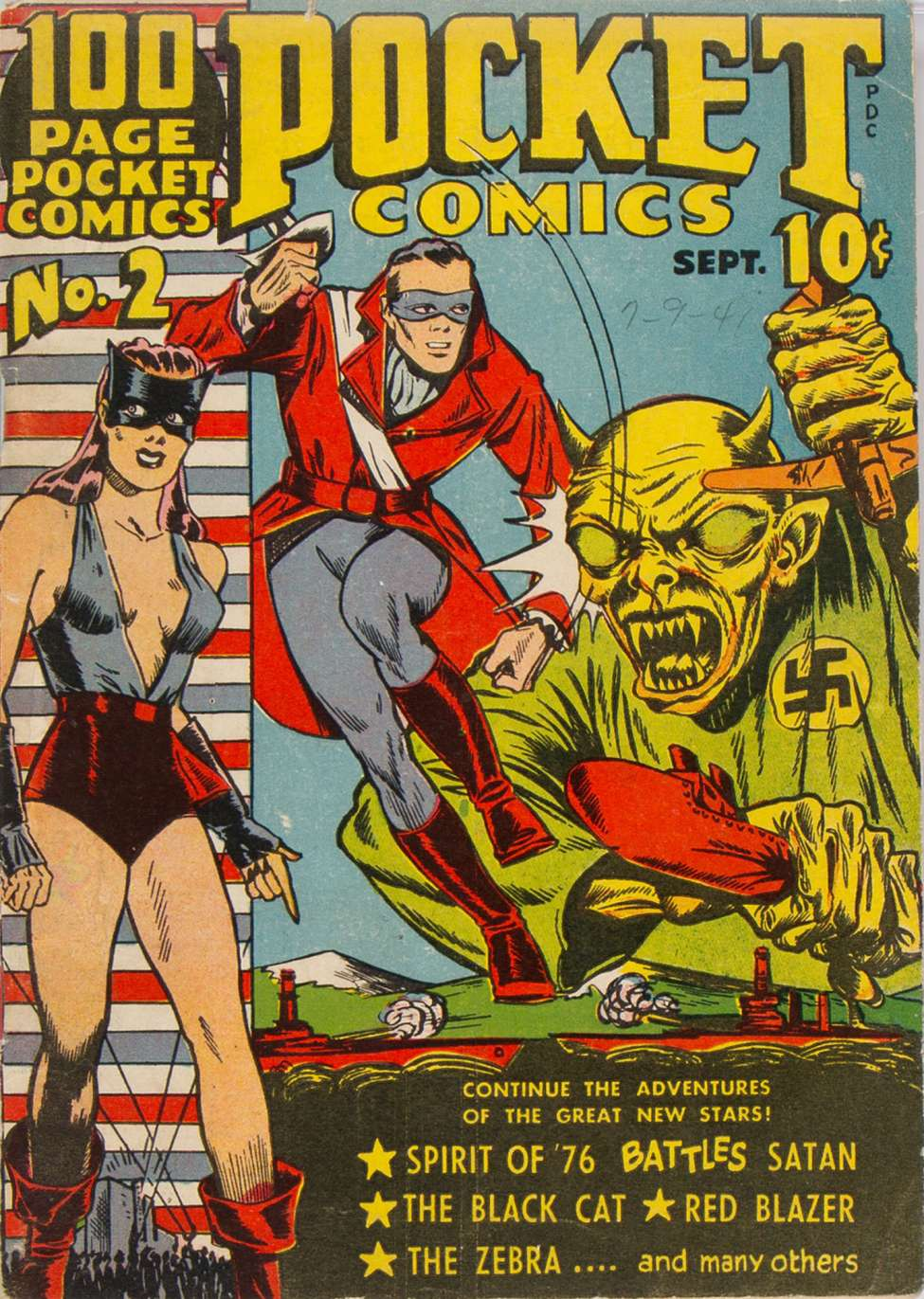
Pocket Comics #2 (September 1941), featuring the Black Cat and the Spirit of '76. Cover artist tentatively identified as Bob Powell.

The Spirit of '76 is a superhero published by Harvey Comics, who debuted in Pocket Comics in 1941, and became a long-running feature in Green Hornet Comics.

== Publication history ==
Patriotic superhero Gary Blakely, the Spirit of '76, was created by writer Joe Simon and artist Bob Powell. The personification of American folklore's Spirit of '76, the character appeared in Harvey's Pocket Comics from #1 to 4 (August 1941 - January 1942). In his first appearance, the character, a student at West Point, fought Nazi fifth columnists on the campus. Pocket Comics #1 also introduced fellow cadet Tubby Reynolds, who figures out Gary's secret and serves as his sidekick. Tubby's sister, Susan, a WAC lieutenant, serves as a love interest. By issue #2, the character was fighting Satan himself, along with a recurring foe, femme fatale Satana.

After Pocket Comics folded, the Spirit of '76 moved to a backup feature in Green Hornet Comics. Issue #7 (June 1942) was a reworking of the character's origin story, partially a paste-up from Pocket #1. Later Green Hornet backup stories were produced by Harry Fisk, Arturo Cazenueve and Ernie Schroeder. The character last appeared in Green Hornet #37 (December 1947 – January 1948).

== Fictional character biography ==
Gary Blakely is the latest in a long line of patriotic Americans, one of his ancestors having served with General Washington. Educated abroad, he excels in his studies as well as various sports like boxing, fencing, rowing and rugby. Convinced that Adolf Hitler wants to take over the world, he tries to become an Air Cadet, but his application is blocked by his family, who want him to instead be in the regular army and enroll in West Point, which he does. Coming across a group of fifth columnists, he puts on his great, great-grandfather's uniform and a mask as a costume and captures them as the Spirit of '76.

According to Jess Nevins' Encyclopedia of Golden Age Superheroes, "they battle Germans, crooked yogis, the femme fatale mesmerist Satana, traitorous cadets, and a monster ape".

In Green Hornet #35, Blakely helps out Tommy Downes, a newsboy kid who's framed for murder by the crook Dapper Duke using Downes' run-ins with a kid gang called The Society of the Black Skull, led by Kip Roland. While Blakely reconciles Tommy with the gang, his civilian identity gets in trouble for being AWOL and is threatened with expulsion. Tubby tells the kids Gary's identity and they vouch for him, giving him an alibi and forming a new gang, The Spirit of '76 Boys Club.

== Reception ==
In Secondary Superheroes of the Golden Age, Lou Mougin lauds the Spirit of '76, writing that Bob Powell "returned to the feature [in Green Hornet] both as artist and writer, and did a bang-up job with his rapidly developed talent. The stories never skimped on the action, but Powell's talent for humor, his penchant for sending the characters to foreign locales, and the backup characters Tubby and Gary's girlfriend, Susan, helped things along considerably. On special assignment, Gary and Tubby racked up an impressive series of adventures. The Spirit of '76 survived the war... For his quality, we salute him".
