= Rose and Thorn =

Fictional character(s) in DC Comics

Rose and Thorn are each the personalities of two different characters appearing in American comic books published by DC Comics, and in which Thorn is a villainous persona. Rose Canton originated during the Golden Age of comics, and Rhosyn "Rose" Forrest during the Silver Age. Until the Crisis on Infinite Earths, Canton and Forrest were from Earth-Two and Earth-One respectively, of the DC Multiverse.

== Fictional character biography ==
=== Rose Canton ===
Thorn

Publication information
- Publisher: DC Comics
- First appearance: Flash Comics #89 (November 1947)
- Created by: John Broome; Carmine Infantino

In-story information
- Alter ego: Rose Canton
- Species: Metahuman
- Notable aliases: Alyx Florin
- Abilities: Limited control over plants, the ability to spin at high speed, knowledge of plant poisons.

Thorn (Rose Canton) is a woman with a split personality whose villainous personality has the ability to control plants. Initially, she and her hired thugs opposed the Flash. After being (apparently) cured of her Thorn persona, Rose married Alan Scott and had two children, Jennie-Lynn Hayden and Todd James Rice by him. After a resurgence of her madness, she left Scott and put her children up for adoption, then went into seclusion for many years. She finally resurfaced and faced the Justice Society several times before her sanity returned, and she committed suicide.

As a child, Rose Canton used an imaginary friend, "Thorn", to deflect blame for bad things that she did. Over the years, Thorn developed as a distinct persona in Rose's head. As an adult, Rose was studying biology on the island of Tashmi, where she was exposed to the sap of a jungle root, which transformed her into Thorn. After killing her teacher, Professor Hollis, she reverted to Rose. Rose returned to America and settled in Keystone City where Thorn headed a gang that harassed the Flash. When she was in control, Rose would approach Jay for help, claiming to be Thorn's sister.

The Amazons of Paradise Island undertook her psychological treatment and apparently managed to rid Rose of the Thorn persona. During her recovery, Rose developed a crush on Alan Scott. Dyeing her hair black, she assumed the identity of Alyx Florin and romantically pursued him, leading to their marriage. Tragedy struck when, on their honeymoon, Thorn returned. The personality of Rose was able to prevent Thorn from killing Alan, but she chose to run, preferring Alan to believe that she had perished in the fire that consumed their cabin. Their brief honeymoon resulted in the conception of twins, the children who were to become Jade and Obsidian. Fearful that Thorn might kill them, she gave the children up for adoption.

Thorn continues to fight Alan, who is still unaware of his wife's alter ego. On the island of Tashmi, she faces her husband and two children, both now adults. To keep Thorn from killing them, Rose fatally stabs herself in the heart.

In 2011, "The New 52" rebooted the DC universe. A one-shot take on Rose and Thorn was published as part of the National Comics line in September 2012, written by Tom Taylor and drawn by Neil Googe. This version of Rose Canton is a teenage girl who is just returning to school after being institutionalized following the death of her father. The shy Rose discovers that she has a violent and sexually adventurous split personality Thorn who is determined to find her father's murderers.

The original version of Rose is reintroduced in "The New Golden Age" where Alan Scott's marriage to Rose remains intact.

=== Rhosyn Lynne Forrest ===
Thorn
- Thorn as depicted in Showcase '96 #5 (April 1996). Art by Steve Erwin (pencils), Gerry Fernandez (inks), and Dave Grafe (colors).

Publication information
- Publisher: DC Comics
- First appearance: Superman's Girl Friend, Lois Lane #105 (October 1970)
- Created by: Robert Kanigher; Ross Andru

In-story information
- Alter ego: Rhosyn Lynne "Rose" Forrest
- Species: Metahuman
- Abilities: Armed combat Hand-to-hand combat Master of disguise Immortality

A second character was created by writer Robert Kanigher and artist Ross Andru in the 12-page Lois Lane story "Death House Honeymoon" in Superman's Girl Friend, Lois Lane #105 (October 1970), with her own series, "Rose and the Thorn", debuting that issue as the title's backup feature.

Rhosyn "Rose" Forrest is the daughter of Metropolis police officer Phil Forrest, who was killed by a criminal gang called the 100. When Rose went to sleep, her Thorn personality would emerge and stalk the streets as a vigilante, attempting to bring the 100 to justice. When she succeeds in bringing the 100 to justice, the "Thorn" personality subsides. Eventually, however, the gang escapes and forms another group, called the 1000, and her alternate personality resurfaces. She has since worked with Superman and Booster Gold to try to put these criminals behind bars. She was briefly under the control of Lord Satanus.

In the 1990s, Thorn appeared in a Green Arrow storyline written by Chuck Dixon. After trying to defeat a Metropolis crime lord, Thorn was defeated by Eddie Fyers and taken prisoner. After being tied up and gagged in a supply closet, Thorn reverted to her Rose persona and began to sob, frightened and confused about what was happening. Rose and Green Arrow worked together to take down the crime lord after she returned to her Thorn persona.

When Harley Quinn and Poison Ivy moved to Metropolis, Thorn immediately attacked them. After a fierce battle, the women left Thorn hanging bound and gagged from a Superman statue in a local park for all of the citizens to see. During a later confrontation, Harley and Ivy defeat Thorn again, this time kidnapping her and keeping her tied up in their garden. After removing the vines from her mouth, Harley drugs Thorn into revealing the secrets about her multiple personalities. Ivy then tortures Thorn to prove that she is weak, eventually leaving her in the care of Bizarro while she takes a break. Thorn is rescued by Supergirl, with whom she works to stop Ivy.

A 2004 Rose & Thorn miniseries by Gail Simone provided a slightly different origin story. In this version, the 100 killed both her parents, but Rhosyn was now revealed to have, at age 12, fought back and mutilated their murderer, Mr. Quince, cutting his hand off. She was then placed into a psychiatric care home, where she constantly flew into violent outbursts. Rhosyn's multiple personality is a result of unethical experimental treatments by a psychiatrist named Dr. Chritlow. The experiments forced her to repress her more violent, base emotions; these emotions were then given to the buried "Thorn" personality, who emerged whenever the submissive Rose felt angry or threatened. Her Thorn personality finally broke out after Rose's roommate Kimmy was burned to death by another patient. Enraged, Thorn viciously mutilated the culprit. Once released into the public, Thorn began taking over more frequently, taking up a role as an ultra-violent vigilante in a quest to take down the 100 and avenge her parents. By the end of the miniseries, it was hinted that she had killed the head of the 100 while he was in the hospital.

In the miniseries, Gail Simone gave Rhosyn an uncle and godfather, Detective Curtis Leland, who was secretly taking bribes from the 100 and had been unable to stop them from killing Rhosyn's parents. Wracked with guilt and determined to protect his goddaughter, he disposed of two 100 grunts who Thorn had dispatched. Curtis was killed while trying to prevent Quince from killing Rhosyn. In his final moments, he put a signed confession in his pocket so the police could arrest them.

It was also revealed that Rose and Thorn are not the only two personalities in Rhosyn's mind. The other two shown have been "Mom", a caring and maternal figure much like how Rose remembers their mother, and "Wild Rose", an Irish vigilante who is even more vicious and punitive than Thorn.

In the DC Rebirth relaunch, Rose and Thorn appeared in September 2019 as part of the relaunch of the Legion of Super-Heroes under Brian Michael Bendis and Szymon Kudranski. This version of Rose likewise has dual personalities, and had a few run-ins with various heroes before medication developed by Lex Luthor suppressed her Thorn personality, allowing her to live a normal life and get married. Rose's medication was eventually discontinued, leaving her fearful of Thorn emerging again. In this version, Rose possesses immortality, which allowed her to survive to the 31st century.

== Powers and abilities ==
Exposure to the sap of a rare tropical plant gave Rose Canton's Thorn personality limited control over plant life, especially those with thorny stalks. The sap was also responsible for physically transforming Rose into the evil Thorn. She also has the ability to spin rapidly like a top. Thorn also had Rose's extensive knowledge of botany and plant-related toxins.

The Rhosyn Lynne Forrest version of Thorn has no superpowers, but she is highly athletic and learned martial arts from her father. She is known to carry a pair of combat daggers, a barbed whip, and a bandolier of tiny, thorn-shaped weapons, some of which contain explosives, miniature smoke bombs, or blinding magnesium flares. She is also a master of disguise. In the "DC Rebirth" version, Rhosyn is immortal and lives unaging for over 1000 years.

== In other media ==
- Rose and Thorn appear in appear in Scribblenauts Unmasked: A DC Comics Adventure.
- The Rose Forrest incarnation of Thorn appears in Batman: Caped Crusader, voiced by Fryda Wolff. This version is Latina-American, has no superpowers, and seeks to avenge her father who was killed by the Riddler.
- Thorn appears in Adventures in the DC Universe Annual #1.
