= Al Hewetson =

Scottish-Canadian writer (1946–2004)

- Born: August 30, 1946 Glasgow, Scotland
- Died: January 6, 2004 (aged 57)
- Areas: Writer, Editor
- Pseudonyms: Joe Dentyn, Stuart Williams, Henry Bergman, Hugh Laskey, Harvey Lazarus, Howie Anderson, Peter Cappiello, Edward Farthing, Victor Buckley
- Notable works: Skywald Publications
- Awards: Hall of Fame Inductee - 2019: Joe Shuster Award, 2014: Ghastly Awards

Alan Hewetson (/hjuːɪtsən/ August 30, 1946 – January 6, 2004) was a Scottish-Canadian writer and editor of American horror-comics magazines, best known for his work with the 1970s publisher Skywald Publications, where he created what he termed the magazines' "Horror-Mood" sensibility. He went on to become a publisher of city magazines in Canada.

== Biography ==
=== Early life and career ===
Al Hewetson was born and initially raised in Glasgow, Scotland, the son of James and Elizabeth Hewetson. There he read such comic books as Classics Illustrated, The Beano and Eagle before his family migrated to Canada when he was 9 years old, in 1956. At his new home, he began reading the satirical Mad and Humbug magazines, becoming infatuated with the work of writer-artist Harvey Kurtzman. Through his involvement in comics fandom, he began corresponding with such future underground and alternative comics creators as Skip Williamson, Jay Lynch, Robert Crumb, and Art Spiegelman, and published a single issue of a fanzine, The Potrzebie Annual (no relation to fellow fan Bhob Stewart's Potrzebie).

He became a darkroom technician and then a staff news photographer at what was then the Sudbury Daily Star of Sudbury, Ontario, followed by photographer jobs at the Ottawa Journal, The Montreal Gazette in 1967, and Ottawa's Canadian Press. In 1966 and 1967, he worked for Expo 67, and in the middle of 1967 founded an advertising and photographic studio in Ottawa and began doing promotion for rock groups. That ended the following year. Also during this time, he photographed Canadian Prime Minister John Diefenbaker at his office and home, and would later be photo editor for at least one of Diefenbaker's three 1975-1977 memoirs.

=== Comics ===
Hoping to start a humor magazine with both text articles and comics, he arranged to interview Marvel Comics editor-in-chief Stan Lee in New York City, New York. Then, as Hewetson recalled in a 1973 interview, he phoned Lee, "with whom I’d corresponded for about a year, and asked him for a position and within a few weeks I had the position. That’s how I got into writing professionally." Decades later, Hewetson detailed that not long after conducting the interview with Lee, "I received a phone call from [Marvel production manager] Sol Brodsky offering me a job as Stan's assistant for 'six months,' for a comparatively small salary. Stan had liked me, needed an assistant, and was going to 'introduce new guys into the medium who he figured had potential,' is how I think they put it.

His duties included opening and answering fan mail, preparing the letters pages for most of the comics, mailing complete sets of comics to Marvel writers and artists, awarding "No Prizes", and serving as Lee's gofer. He also took the Marvel staff and freelancer photos published in Fantastic Four Annual #7 (cover-dated Nov. 1969). Lee invited him to submit story ideas, but Hewetson's writing style, heavily influenced by Edgar Allan Poe and other 19th-century authors, proved "highly unsuitable for Marvel superheroes", Hewetson said. He remained at his post from February to September 1969, and was succeeded as Lee's assistant by Allyn Brodsky, no relation to Sol Brodsky.

The following year, Hewetson and veteran artist Syd Shores responded to DC Comics editorial director Carmine Infantino's desire for new concepts in comics magazines and devised a concept

...about a long-haired freak about 27 or 28 years old who was elected to the United States Senate. It was to be produced as a color magazine ... with very adult and very sophisticated artwork and obviously with very adult writing. Syd and I became quite friendly at the time we were preparing this, so we decided to work out a newspaper strip together called Tales of the Macabre, which was for American syndication, as well as ... a humourous [sic] strip called Dirty Soks. Being a Canadian and living in Ottawa, I was interested in releasing something for Canada if I could do so. So, we worked out the thing called The Satirists which was a parody of Canadian news items as they appeared. ... We sent it around with a promotion to all the Canadian newspapers [and a] number of them replied, but not enough to make it financially worthwhile to go ahead with it.

Hewetson said The Satirists was done in 1971, and that Dirty Soks and a daily and Sunday Tales of the Macabre ran from 1972 to 1974.

Hewetson and Shores did collaborate on Hewetson's one horror story for Marvel, the seven-page "Master and Slave" in Creatures on the Loose #12 (July 1971); this came after he had already begun writing uncredited stories for rival DC Comics and for the satirical magazines Sick and Cracked, and penning his first credited story, the 10-page "4 – 3 – 2 – 1 – Blast Off! to a Nightmare!", illustrated by Jack Sparling, in Warren Publishing's black-and-white horror-comics magazine Vampirella #3 (Jan. 1970).

That had come about, he said in 2003, when he was writing an article for Cinema magazine about comic-book characters in film:

I knew [that the Warren movie magazine] Famous Monsters of Filmland had old movie stills, so I called them up, talked to [publisher] Jim Warren, and he invited me 'round to meet him. He was very helpful providing pictures for my feature, and we appeared to get along immediately. He asked me to write stories for [his black-and-white horror-comics magazines] Creepy and Eerie, and I did — I sent him stories within about a week and he liked them and asked for more. He never rejected anything I ever wrote for him, even though I admit some of my earlier stories were pretty flimsy.

=== Skywald ===
Hewetson went on to write a number of stories through mid-1971 issues of Warren's Creepy and Eerie, while also breaking in at the start-up rival Skywald Publications, with "Vault of a Vampire" in Nightmare #3 (April 1971). Skywald was co-founded in 1970 by Sol Brodsky, whom Hewetson knew from Marvel Comics, and who brought freelancer Hewetson in as associate editor; Hewetson's first credit as such appears in Psycho #7 (July 1972). By the following month, Brodsky had returned to Marvel, and Hewetson became Skywald's editor, managing editorial from his home in St. Catharines, Ontario, Canada. As he described the process,

I write my stories, and edit others' stories, and send them directly to the various artists. The art is sent to New York, when finished, where I collate it. I produce all the editorial production here at home, and when I visit New York I package the entire magazine and do the production for it. And then, in an incredible fat bundle, I mail the thing off to our printers who have nothing to do but perhaps add the occasional, miscellaneous screen and make the negatives for the magazine. Blueprint proofs of those negatives are sent to me which I proof editorially and I make certain changes and approve the package. And the magazine is then printed in Canada and then shipped to Connecticut and from there to various distribution centers, including back to Canada.

==== "The Horror-Mood" ====
Soon afterward, Hewetson, both out of personal preference and in an attempt to distinguish Skywald's magazines from those of industry leader Warren, instituted a stylistic theme he called "Horror-Mood", going so far as to receive approval from publisher Israel Waldman to change the company name to Horror-Mood Publishing Corp. — a move nixed by the low-budget company's accountant, who noted there would be legal costs incurred in a name change, which would also potentially confuse distributors. As Hewetson described the genesis and specifics of the Horror-Mood in 2003, it

...wasn't patterned after any other magazines that had ever existed, but was inspired by everything that had ever ... had the word horror applied to it. I was particularly enamored of Poe and the classics, and by Lovecraft, who wasn't exactly 'unknown' at the time, but he wasn't exactly a household name either. And by then I’d come to love the old EC horror comics, which I didn’t particularly like as a kid.... So the Horror-Mood was a glass bowl containing everything I respected about horror, including loftier writers like Kafka and Dostoyevsky and Orwell.

Hewetson estimates he wrote over 500 published stories for Skywald, using such pseudonyms as Joe Dentyn, Stuart Williams, Henry Bergman, Hugh Laskey, Harvey Lazarus and Howie Anderson, as well as Peter Cappiello, Edward Farthing, and Victor Buckley. He also created a public persona, "Archaic Al Hewetson", that would often appear as a mascot, introducing stories. Hewetson's ongoing "Shoggoth Crusade" feature, which launched with "This Grotesque Green Earth" in Nightmare #15 (Oct. 1973), envisioned himself and other Skywald staffers hunting subterranean supernatural creatures. Hewetson also wrote the ongoing feature "The Human Gargoyles", which he called "a Kafkaesque parody of religion, horror, society, family life and pop culture" as seen through the experiences of a family of three gargoyles (technically, grotesques) come to life.

=== Later career and death ===
Toward the end of Skywald's existence — which Hewetson was tasked to officially announce in a March 25, 1975, memo to staffers and others — Hewetson became involved with a movie company in Toronto, Ontario, Canada. It is unclear whether this was Quadrant Films, for which Hewetson, post-Skywald, wrote several paid-for but unproduced screenplays. He recalled in 2003,

I wrote a horror movie for [Quadrant] called Gaunt [about] a 350-year-old sorcerer hell-bound to have his own way about everything. And then I wrote a screenplay called Conspiracy, a Presidential murder mystery; and then Murderstone, a thriller about the diamond business. And then Savage Midsummer's Night, a thriller about illegal dog fights in a rural Canadian community. Then Lunatics, about a dysfunctional family whose many members were determined to kill each other. Then Ladykiller, a thriller about a hit-woman who was engaged to kill her victims in very dramatic ways.

Six to eight months after Skywald ended, and concurrent with his Quadrant screenwriting, Hewetson began publishing a city magazine for St. Catharines, Ontario, and neighboring Niagara Falls, Ontario. He successfully expanded to city magazines in Buffalo, New York, and Windsor, Ontario, the latter called Greater Windsor. By 2003, he and artist Pablo Marcos, a Skywald compatriot, were working on two graphic novels: Labyrinth Street, a horror anthology series set in New Orleans, Louisiana, and Suko: Samurai Time Warrior. With another Skywald artist, Maelo Cintron, he was planning to create a modern-day Western series, Gargoyle Justice, starring the grownup "Human Gargoyles" child, Andrew Sartyros, as a U.S. Marshal.

== Personal life ==
Hewetson married Julie Williams in Sudbury, Ontario, in 1968. The couple had a daughter, Wendy. Hewetson and Williams divorced in 1991 in Windsor, Ontario. From the early 1990s until the time of his death, Al Hewetson was in a common law relationship with Michelle Lemieux in Windsor.

Following the 1982 death of Canadian artist and Skywald contributor Gene Day, rumors circulated for years that Hewetson was dead, which Hewetson attributed to "the word spread[ing] that 'the young Canadian who used to do Skywald is dead.'" Hewetson survived a heart attack and stroke in 2001, then died unexpectedly on January 6, 2004, shortly after finishing work on the book Skywald!: The Complete Illustrated History of the Skywald Horror-Mood (Headpress/Critical Vision, 2004).

== Awards ==
In 2014, Al Hewetson was inducted into The Ghastly Awards Hall of Fame for outstanding work in horror comics.

In 2019, Al Hewetson was inducted into The Joe Shuster Canadian Comic Book Creator Awards Hall of Fame for outstanding achievement in the creation of comic books.
