= Ross Andru =

American comic book artist (1927-1993)

- Andru in 1977
- Born: Rostislav Androuchkevitch; June 15, 1927 Highland Park, Michigan, U.S.
- Died: November 9, 1993 (aged 66) Long Island, New York, U.S.
- Areas: Penciller, Inker, Editor
- Notable works: The Amazing Spider-Man; The Flash; Metal Men; Superman vs. Spider-Man; Wonder Woman

Ross Andru (/ˈændruː/; born Rostislav Androuchkevitch, June 15, 1927 – November 9, 1993) was an American comics artist and editor whose career in comics spanned six decades. He is best known for his work on The Amazing Spider-Man, Wonder Woman, The Flash, and The Metal Men, and for having co-created the character called The Punisher.

His most frequent collaborator was comics inker Mike Esposito, with whom he worked on projects over a span of four decades. The two also founded three short-lived comic books companies: Mr. Publications (1951), MikeRoss (1953) and Klevart Enterprises (1970).

== Early life and education ==
Ross Andru was born in Highland Park, Michigan on June 15, 1927, the third of Alexander and Glafire (née Evanoff) Androuchkevitch's three children. Andru grew up in Cleveland, Ohio, raised by Russian émigré parents who came to the US in 1926.

After moving to New York City, Andru graduated from The High School of Music & Art, then in Harlem. One of his classmates and friends was future comics artist Mike Esposito. While students, they collaborated on flip book animation. Andru joined the US Army in 1945, and was discharged in 1946.

In 1947, Andru attended the Cartoonists and Illustrators School, studying under Burne Hogarth. Again, Esposito was Andru's classmate.

== Career ==
=== Early work ===
In 1946, Andru worked for an animation studio in Manhattan drawing artwork for Chiclets chewing gum commercials.

In 1948, Andru's first professional work as a comic strip illustrator was drawing layouts for the Tarzan newspaper strip. As his longtime partner Mike Esposito recalled, he and Andru were attending Burne Hogarth's Cartoonists and Illustrators School in 1947 when "Burne took Ross out of the class because he saw the talent he had and asked him, 'Would you like to assist me on Tarzan? (the newspaper strip for the Sunday page of the New York Daily Mirror). He paid Ross by the month... the G.I. Bill gave him a few bucks to live on. Ross would lay it out then Burne would ink it with his approach... actually change everything and it would look really like Burne Hogarth when he got through with it. Ross (Andru) had a great concept for visuals for the layout, for the storytelling. That's what Burne Hogarth saw in Ross and he developed him to pull all that out, the shots and the depth of field. That only lasted a couple of years, because the strip died in about 1950–51... Ross came to me when I started publishing and we more or less teamed up'."

=== Partnership with Esposito ===
A source claims penciler Andru first teamed with inker Esposito in 1949 for the publisher Fiction House, but this is unconfirmed at the Grand Comics Database.

The team's first confirmed collaboration was on the six-page "Wylie's Wild Horses" in Hillman Periodicals' Western Fighters vol. 2, #12 (Nov. 1950), signaling the start of a four-decade collaboration.

They quickly founded their own comics-book company, the name of which is variously rendered as MR Publications, the combined initials of their first names; Mr. Publications, after the company's sole series, the whimsical adventure comic Mister Universe, which ran five issues (July 1951 – April 1952); or the hybrid MR. Publications. The two also co-founded Mikeross Publications in 1953, which through 1954 produced one issue each of the 3D romance comics 3-D Love and 3-D Romance, two issues of the romance comic Heart and Soul, and three issues of the satiric humor comic Get Lost.

Andru and Esposito created early work on Key Publications' Mister Mystery in 1951 and Standard Comics' The Unseen and Joe Yank (the latter credited as "Mikeross").

=== DC Comics ===
Wonder Woman #98 (May 1958). Cover art by Andru and inker Mike Esposito, marking the start of their decade-long run on the character, defining her look in the Silver Age of Comic Books.

In September, 1953, the two began a long career as one of DC Comics' primary war story creative teams, alongside the likes of Joe Kubert, Russ Heath, and Jerry Grandenetti. Their partnership at DC Comics began with a story each in All-American Men of War #6, Our Army at War #14, and Star Spangled War Stories #13 (all Sept. 1953). For those titles as well as G.I. Combat and Our Fighting Forces, Andru and Esposito drew hundreds of tales of combat under editor and frequent writer Robert Kanigher's supervision.

From 1957 to 1959, Andru and Esposito shared a studio with fellow comics artists Jack Abel, Art Peddy and Bernard Sachslate, generally credited as either Bernard Sachs or Bernie Sachs.

Andru began a nine-year run on Wonder Woman starting with issue #98 (May 1958), where he and writer Robert Kanigher reinvented the character, introducing the Silver Age version and her supporting cast. As well, with writer-editor Robert Kanigher, Andru co-created the robot superheroes called The Metal Men in Showcase #37 (April 1962), going on to draw the first 29 issues of the lighthearted series Metal Men, from 1963 to 1968. Esposito said Kanigher "left the character design up to Ross and myself, under his supervision, of course."

Andru and Kanigher had several other notable collaborations. The "Gunner and Sarge" feature introduced in All-American Men of War (comics) #67 (March 1959) was one of the first war comics to feature recurring characters. Andru drew an early appearance of Kanigher's Sgt. Rock character in Our Army at War #81 (April 1959) With Kanigher, the Andru-Esposito team introduced the non-superpowered adventurers the Suicide Squad in The Brave and the Bold #25 (Sept. 1959).

Another innovation was the melding of war comics with science-fiction in "The War that Time Forgot", a feature created by Kanigher and Andru in Star Spangled War Stories #90 (May 1960). The title was set in the South Pacific on Dinosaur Island, an island inhabited by giant, living dinosaurs and other prehistoric creatures. The stories were set in the 1940s during World War II.

Andru also drew early issues of Rip Hunter, Time Master in 1961, and the Sea Devils.

In 1967, Andru left Wonder Woman to become the penciler on The Flash, with he and inker Esposito drawing the super-speedster superhero's adventures from issue #175–194 (Dec. 1967 – Feb. 1970). Reuniting with Kanigher, Andru co-created the "Rose & The Thorn" backup feature in Superman's Girl Friend, Lois Lane #105 (Oct. 1970).

=== Side projects ===
A Spider-Man story drawn by Andru in 1968 was originally planned as a fill-in issue of The Amazing Spider-Man but was published in Marvel Super-Heroes #14 when regular Spider-Man artist John Romita Sr. recovered more quickly than anticipated from a wrist injury.

For the black-and-white comics-magazine publisher Skywald in 1971, Andru and Esposito contributed many stories across the line, including to the horror titles Nightmare and Psycho and the Western titles Wild Western Action, The Bravados and Butch Cassidy. With writer Gary Friedrich, they created Skywald's motorcycle-riding superhero Hell-Rider.

Andru and Esposito formed the publishing company Klevart Enterprises in 1970, which two years later published two issues of a humor magazine cover-titled Up Your Nose (and Out Your Ear). The name, Esposito said, came from an expression used by late-night talk-show host Johnny Carson, "May the bird of paradise fly up your nose, and out your ear." A third issue was written but never printed because of financial problems.

=== Marvel Comics ===
The Amazing Spider-Man #176 (Jan. 1978. Cover art by Andru and inker Frank Giacoia.

In the early 1970s, Andru left DC for Marvel Comics. Initially he did short runs on such titles as Marvel Feature where he launched the superhero team the Defenders in issue #1 (Dec. 1971) and Marvel Team-Up, starting in March 1972, where he drew Spider-Man teaming with other Marvel characters. In 1973, he began his five-year stint as regular penciler on The Amazing Spider-Man, which at that point was Marvel's highest-selling monthly comic. Andru and writer Gerry Conway introduced the Punisher, who would become one of Marvel Comics' most popular characters.

In 1976, Andru penciled the first large-scale comic book Intercompany crossover, Superman vs. the Amazing Spider-Man, in a story written by Conway and co-published by Marvel and DC. As one comics historian wrote, "The tale was written by Gerry Conway and drawn by Ross Andru, both among the few [at that time] to ever have worked on both Superman and Spider-Man ... The result was a defining moment in Bronze Age of Comic Books."

=== Return to DC Comics ===
In 1978, Andru returned to DC to work as an editor, a position he held until 1986. During this period his art appeared mostly on the covers of such titles as Action Comics and Superman. Working with writer Marv Wolfman and collaborator Mike Esposito, he co-created the syndicated comic strip The Unexplained in 1979. Throughout the late 1970s and the 1980s, Andru and inker Dick Giordano were DC's primary cover artists, providing cover artwork for the Superman titles as well as covers for many of the other comics in the DC line at that time.

In the 1980s, Andru returned to interior artwork. He and Roy Thomas collaborated on the "Superman and His Incredible Fortress of Solitude" treasury edition published as DC Special Series #26 (Summer 1981). Pandora Pann was a proposed series by Andru and writer Len Wein which was to have been published in 1982. But other commitments prevented Wein from writing it, and the project was cancelled.

In 1981, Andru contributed to the DC Super Heroes Super Healthy Cookbook, illustrating various Justice League characters as they explained food recipes to a 4th to 6th grade audience. Additional artists included Dick Giordano and Leo Durañona.

Andru made a brief return to the Wonder Woman title, drawing six pages in issue #300 (Feb. 1983). The following year, Andru contributed to the 300th issue of World's Finest Comics as well. A New Teen Titans drug awareness comic book sponsored by the American Soft Drink Industry and drawn by Andru was published in cooperation with The President's Drug Awareness Campaign in 1983. Andru also pencilled Teen Titans Spotlight #3–6 (1986–1987). He was one of the contributors to the DC Challenge limited series in 1986. Other Andru artwork appeared in Vigilante (1984) and Blue Beetle (1987–1988).

=== Later life and career ===
In 1990, Ross Andru contributed a story to Valiant Comics' Captain N:The Game Master #1. The same year, he reunited with writer Gerry Conway and inker Mike Esposito for a story in Web of Spider-Man Annual #6. In 1992, the graphic novel Spider-Man: Fear Itself, pencilled by Andru, inked by Esposito, plotted by Conway and scripted by Stan Lee was published. Andru's last published work was for Archie Comics' Zen, Intergalactic Ninja in 1992, on which he was teamed once again with Esposito.

Prior to his death, Andru was working with Esposito on a new project to be called The Strobe Warrior for another independent company founded by Esposito and his assistant Blake Seals. The project fell apart after Andru's passing but was revived years later in song by a band called Fling Lois.

== Style and technique ==
Frequent collaborator Gerry Conway commented of Ross Andru's work, "Ross Andru could place a character anywhere he wanted. He had a terrific sense of spatial relations; he could track a battle easily across rooftops, from panel to panel. He drew some great sequences where he maintained the same stationary background, a rooftop or a street, across an entire page, but move the characters from panel to panel. I know there are artists today who do that, but many of today's artists are figure-oriented. Space and context doesn't seem as important to them, whereas it was extremely important to Ross. He used to go around New York City taking pictures of the buildings so he could be accurate about where he put Spider-Man."

== Death and burial ==
Andru suffered a brain aneurysm and died on November 9, 1993, in Jamaica Bay, Queens County, New York. His body was cremated and interred at the Fresh Pond Crematory and Columbarium, Middle Village, Queens County, New York.

== Awards and homages ==
Andru was inducted into the Will Eisner Comic Book Hall of Fame in 2007.

In Ultimate Spider-Man issue #87 (Feb. 2006), a "Ross Andru" has a cameo as the principal of Peter Parker's high school.

== Bibliography ==
Comics work (interior pencil art) includes:

=== Archie Comics ===
- Zen, Intergalactic Ninja #1–3 (1992)
- Zen, Intergalactic Ninja vol. 2 #1–3 (1992)

=== DC Comics ===
- Action Comics #362–366, 391–392, 599 (Superman); #393 (Superboy) (1968–1970, 1988)
- Atari Force #1–2, 4 (1982)
- Atari Force vol. 2 #4–5 (1984)
- Batman #213, #409, Annual #12 (with Pablo Marcos) (1969, 1987–1988)
- Blue Beetle #15–16, 19–22 (1987–1988)
- The Brave and the Bold #74–75, 77, 89–90, 199 (1967–1983)
- Captain Carrot and His Amazing Zoo Crew! #1 (Superman figures only) (1982)
- DC Challenge, limited series, #12 (four pages, among other artists) (1986)
- DC Comics Presents #53 (Atari Force preview) (1983)
- DC Special Series #26 (Superman) (1981)
- Detective Comics #386 (Robin) (1969)
- Firestorm #65 (1987)
- The Flash #175–194 (1967–1970)
- House of Secrets #87 (1970)
- Heroes Against Hunger (two pages) (1986)
- Jonah Hex #48 (El Diablo); #57 (Jonah Hex) (1981–1982)
- Metal Men #1–29 (1963–1968)
- New Teen Titans #27 (Atari Force preview) (1983)
- The New Teen Titans (Drug Awareness Campaign, NSDA - promo) #2 (1983)
- Our Army at War #216, 220, 238, 243, 275, 280 (1970–1975)
- Our Fighting Forces #124–125, 127–129 (1970–71)
- Showcase (Metal Men) #37–40 (1962)
- Superman #204, 211, 216 (1968–1969)
- Superman's Girl Friend, Lois Lane #105 (with Art Saaf); #105–106, 108 (The Rose & The Thorn) (1970–1971)
- Teen Titans Spotlight #3–6 (1986–1987)
- The Unexpected #120, 147 (1970–1973)
- Vigilante #8–11, Annual #2 (1984)
- Weird War Tales #2–3, 6 (1971–1972)
- Wonder Woman #98–171; #300 (six pages, among other artists) (1958–1967, 1983)
- Wonder Woman Annual #1 (seven pages, among other artists) (1988)
- World's Finest Comics #180–183, 185–187, 189–195, 296, 300 (1968–1970, 1984)

=== Marvel Comics ===
- The Amazing Spider-Man #125–131, 133–149, 151–153, 156–180, 182–185 (1973–1978)
- Arrgh #5 (1975)
- Crazy Magazine #1 (1973)
- Creatures on the Loose #18 (1972)
- Doc Savage #1–7 (1972)
- Fantastic Four #131, 145–146 (1972–1974)
- Giant-Size Spider-Man #1–5 (1974–1975)
- Iron Man (Ant-Man) #44 (1972)
- John Carter, Warlord of Mars #15 (1978)
- Kull the Conqueror #1 (1971)
- Marvel Feature (The Defenders) #1–3 (1971–1972)
- Marvel Super-Heroes (Spider-Man) #14 (1968)
- Marvel Team-Up (Spider-Man) #1–3, 7, 9, 12, 15 (1972–1973)
- Savage Tales (Shanna the She-Devil) #10 (1975)
- Shanna the She-Devil #2–5 (1973)
- The Spectacular Spider-Man #6, Annual #10 (1977, 1990)
- Spider-Man: Fear Itself GN (1992)
- Sub-Mariner #37–38 (1971)
- Uncanny X-Men #36–37 (1967)
- Unknown Worlds of Science Fiction #1 (1975)
- What If (Nova) #15 (1979)
- Web of Spider-Man Annual #6 (1990)

=== DC Comics / Marvel Comics ===
- Superman vs. the Amazing Spider-Man (1976)

=== Skywald Publications ===
- Butch Cassidy #2–3 (1971)
- Nightmare #1–2 (1970)
- Psycho #2–5 (1971)

=== Valiant Comics ===
- Captain N: The Game Master #1 (1990)

Preceded by H. G. Peter	Wonder Woman artist 1958–1967	Succeeded by Irv Novick
Preceded by Carmine Infantino	The Flash artist 1967–1970	Succeeded by Gil Kane
Preceded by John Romita Sr.	The Amazing Spider-Man artist 1973–1978	Succeeded by Keith Pollard
Preceded by Julius Schwartz	Justice League of America editor 1979–1980	Succeeded by Len Wein
