= Mike Esposito (comics) =

American comic book artist (1927–2010)

- Esposito in 1977, from Amazing World of DC Comics #15
- Born: Michael Esposito; July 14, 1927 New York City, New York, U.S.
- Died: October 24, 2010 (aged 83) Suffolk County, New York, U.S.
- Areas: Writer, Penciller, Inker, Editor, Publisher
- Pseudonyms: Mickey Demeo, Mickey Dee, Michael Dee, Joe Gaudioso
- Notable works: The Amazing Spider-Man; The Flash; Metal Men; Wonder Woman

Michael "Mike" Esposito (July 14, 1927 – October 24, 2010), who sometimes used the pseudonyms Mickey Demeo, Mickey Dee, Michael Dee, and Joe Gaudioso, was an American comic book artist whose work for DC Comics, Marvel Comics and others spanned the 1950s to the 2000s. As a comic book inker teamed with his childhood friend Ross Andru, he drew for such major titles as The Amazing Spider-Man and Wonder Woman. An Andru-Esposito drawing of Wonder Woman appears on a 2006 U.S. stamp.

Esposito was inducted into the Will Eisner Comic Book Hall of Fame in 2007.

== Biography ==
=== Early life and career ===
Mike Esposito was born in New York City, New York, with a musician father who in 1928 fronted the band Ralph Perry and His Orchestra, and later was a grocer. Esposito graduated from The High School of Music & Art, then in Harlem, where one of his classmates and friends was future comics artist Ross Andru, with whom he would collaborate on flip-book animation. One early artistic influence was Milt Caniff's Terry and the Pirates, while another was Lev Gleason Publications crime comics artist George Tuska, of whom he said,

For some reason, I was attracted to that stuff more than the superheroes, as a kid ... and I love the way he drew those characters. They were like a caricature of the real gangsters. ... I loved the faces of his — their teeth and the kind of garb they would wear, their clothing. As a young fella, 14 years old, I tried to draw like him. ... I used to always want to emulate his look. Part of it had to do with the fact that he didn't overwork [his drawings]. It was simplistic, the backgrounds and so on. The character was the whole thing. The facial expressions. ...

Originally Esposito dreamed of becoming an animator at Disney. This ended when his father did not want him to leave New York for the West Coast. Drafted into the U.S. Army on September 15, 1945, before finishing high school, he served at Camp Dix and Camp Crowder until it was discovered he could draw; Esposito was then dispatched to Germany, where he did venereal disease prevention posters, including the well-known "If you're drippin', you ain't shippin'" and "VD or not VD, that is the question." He was discharged from the Army "in about '47." That year he and Andru both enrolled in Burne Hogarth's Cartoonists and Illustrators School, later renamed the School of Visual Arts. Esposito's first published work in the comic-book field was for Victor Fox's Fox Feature Syndicate, where he worked as penciler, inker, and sometimes letterer.

Andru assisted Hogarth on the Tarzan newspaper comic strip from 1948 until, Esposito recalled, "the strip died in about 1950-51. Then Ross came to me when I started publishing and we more or less teamed up." Another source says penciler Andru first teamed with inker Esposito in 1949 for the publisher Fiction House, but this is unconfirmed at the Grand Comics Database. The team's first confirmed collaboration was on the six-page "Wylie's Wild Horses" in Hillman Periodicals' Western Fighters vol. 2, #12 (Nov. 1950), signaling the start of a four-decade collaboration.

In 1949, Esposito was working on staff at Lev Gleason. "I was there for a while and then I shopped around. Went to school first, naturally, and then went up to Timely Comics [the future Marvel Comics, as it was transitioning into its 1950s iteration, Atlas Comics]. ... Stan Lee interviewed me and said, 'Okay, you can start here as a penciler.' So my job was to pencil so many pages a week for my salary." His first confirmed work there is as penciler and inker of the war comics story "Heat of Battle" in Men's Adventures #6 (Feb. 1951), though he had done much uncredited work in the interim, including his first professional inking. He recalled,

I didn't do any inking until I was with Timely Comics and I met a girl up there who was in charge of the inking department. I was at a bar in the Empire State Building with Mike Sekowsky, and I said to her, "Gee, I'd like to get some inking done".... I didn't know then, but she was in charge of all the inking, so she gave me some pages of a story by Ed Winiarski. He did all teenage stuff like Millie the Model. I took one home, and I did it. I was getting $15 or $17 a page and that was pretty good on the inking. Pencillers were only getting $2 to $3 a page more and at that time there was a lot more work than pencil. Stan Lee found [out] about it. He called me and said, "Who gave you this stuff? You're a penciller, you do a page per day and if you want to do freelance pencilling at home on the weekends then you can take a pencil story home." I said, "Well, no. I just wanted to try it"; the whole idea of inking was something new. He said, "Well, it's a damn good job".... Maybe it wasn't that good at all but he made me feel comfortable with what I did. The end result was that I wanted to do more of the inking but I never got an opportunity. I stayed there for quite a while and I worked on Lev Gleason's Crime and Punishment magazine.

Let go from Atlas Comics after a short time, he and Andru became longtime collaborators, working together on various projects over a span of four decades.

Wonder Woman #98 (May 1958). Cover art by Ross Andru and Esposito, marking the start of their decade-long run on the character, defining her look in the Silver Age of Comic Books.

They quickly founded their own comics-book company, the name of which is variously rendered as MR Publications, after the initial of their first names; Mr. Publications, after the company's sole series, the whimsical adventure comic Mister Universe, which ran five issues (July 1951 - April 1952); or the hybrid MR. Publications. The two also co-founded Mikeross Publications in 1953, which through 1954 produced one issue each of the 3D romance comics 3-D Love and 3-D Romance, two issues of the romance comic Heart and Soul, and three issues of the satiric humor comic Get Lost.

By this time, after having teamed for early work on Key Publications' Mister Mystery in 1951 and Standard Comics' The Unseen and Joe Yank (the latter credited as "Mikeross"), the two began a long career as one of DC Comics' primary war story artists, alongside the likes of Joe Kubert, Russ Heath, and Jerry Grandenetti, beginning with a story each in All-American Men of War #6, Our Army at War #14, and Star Spangled War Stories #13 (all Sept. 1953). For those titles as well as G.I. Combat and Our Fighting Forces, Andru and Esposito drew hundreds of tales of combat under editor and frequent writer Robert Kanigher.

From 1957 to 1959, Andru and Esposito shared a studio with fellow comics artists Jack Abel, Art Peddy and Bernie Sachslate, generally credited as Bernie Sachs. With Kanigher, the Andru-Esposito team introduced the non-superpowered adventurers the Suicide Squad in The Brave and the Bold #25 (Sept. 1959). The duo also drew early issues of Rip Hunter, Time Master in 1961.

=== Silver Age ===
After DC Comics in 1956 ushered in the period fans and historians call the Silver Age of Comic Books, by reimagining such Golden Age superheroes as the Flash and Green Lantern for modern audiences, Andru and Esposito began a long run on DC's Wonder Woman. They drew the long-running superheroine's title from issues #98–171 (May 1958 – August 1967), "defining her look during [this] boom period". As well, with writer-editor Robert Kanigher, they co-created the robot superheroes the Metal Men in Showcase #37 (April 1962), going on to draw the first 29 issues of the lighthearted series Metal Men, from 1963 to 1968. Esposito considered the series "the best idea [Kanigher] had done," specifying that, "Bob left the character design up to Ross and myself, under his supervision, of course."

Original art, The Amazing Spider-Man #51 (August 1967), page 16. An early example of the John Romita Sr.-Mike Esposito penciling and inking team that defined the post-Ditko look of Marvel's flagship character.

Esposito gradually began freelancing for Marvel Comics, starting with his uncredited inking of industry giant Jack Kirby's cover of Fantastic Four Annual #3 (1965). For his inking of Bob Powell in the "Human Torch and the Thing" feature in Strange Tales #132, and his inking of Don Heck's "Iron Man" in Tales of Suspense #65 (both May 1965), he took the pen name Mickey Demeo (occasionally given as Mickey Dee or Michael Dee) to conceal his Marvel work from his primary employer, DC. He also occasionally worked under the pseudonym Joe Gaudioso for the same reason. The pseudonym Mickey Demeo, he explained, "was a name I had in the 1950s when I was doing horror [comics] stories" — considered disreputable at the time — "and I didn't want certain guys in the business to know who I was us. Mickey Demo was a relative's name up in Boston."

When John Romita, Sr. succeeded artist co-creator Steve Ditko on The Amazing Spider-Man, beginning with issue #39 (Aug. 1966), Esposito, initially as Demeo, was the first inker on what would become Marvel's flagship series. After three issues, Romita inked himself for the next half-dozen before Esposito returned — uncredited for issue #49 (June 1967), then as Mickey Demeo until finally taking credit under his own name with issue #56 (Jan. 1968). Except for one issue (#65) inked by his successor, Jim Mooney, the Romita-Esposito team continued through issue #66 (Nov. 1968), establishing the new look of Spider-Man. Esposito continued to use the "Demeo" credit sporadically, including on the debut story "Guardians of the Galaxy" in Marvel Super-Heroes #18 (Jan. 1969), and on The Amazing Spider-Man #83 (April 1970), his last recorded use of the pen name.

During this period as well, for DC, the Andru-Esposito team segued from Wonder Woman to The Flash, drawing the super-speedster superhero's adventures from issue #175–194 (Dec. 1967 – Feb. 1970). All the while, Esposito regularly inked such artists as Irv Novick and Curt Swan on the Superman family of comics, including Superman's Girl Friend, Lois Lane, Superboy, and Superman, and numerous Superman-Batman team-ups penciled by Andru in World's Finest Comics. The Kanigher-Andru-Esposito trio introduced the Silver Age version of the split-personality superheroine feature "Rose and Thorn" in Superman's Girl Friend, Lois Lane #105 (Oct. 1970). For the black-and-white comics-magazine publisher Skywald in 1971, Andru and Esposito contributed many stories across the line, including to the horror titles Nightmare and Psycho and the Western titles Wild Western Action, The Bravados and Butch Cassidy. With writer Gary Friedrich, they created Skywald's motorcycle-riding superhero Hell-Rider.

Andru and Esposito formed the publishing company Klevart Enterprises in 1970, which two years later published two issues of a humor magazine cover-titled Up Your Nose (and Out Your Ear). The name, Esposito said, came from an expression used by late-night talk-show host Johnny Carson, "May the bird of paradise fly up your nose, and out your ear." A third issue was written but never printed because of financial problems. After the magazine's demise, Esposito, who often came into the Marvel office to do freelance work for the company, took a staff job there for "about a year and a half", explaining,

I had gone bankrupt with Ross [Andru], publishing Up Your Nose (and Our Your Ear), and so [Marvel associate editor] Roy Thomas said, 'Do you want a staff job?' It paid $75 a week, but you got all the freelance with it. At one time I was $1,200 a week because of all the freelance. That's when I quit the staff job. I had more freelance that I could handle going into the office every day. So I went back to complete freelance. I was like a machine at that point, turning them out."

=== Spider-Man ===
The Andru-Esposito team first drew the flagship Marvel Comics character Spider-Man in the premiere (March 1972) of that superhero's first spin-off comic book, Marvel Team-Up, nearly every issue of which featured Spider-Man paired with another hero. While Andru did not remain on the series, Esposito would go on to ink several issues, often those penciled by Gil Kane. Andru and Esposito eventually took over the flagship title The Amazing Spider-Man. Esposito inked the vast majority of a nearly four-year run on the title, encompassing issues #147-150, 152-171, 177, 179-182, 185-186, 188, and 191 (Aug. 1975 - April 1979), all penciled by Andru except for three issues penciled by Sal Buscema and two by Keith Pollard. Esposito inked the feature stories in The Amazing Spider-Man Annual #4-5 (1967–1968), over Larry Lieber's pencils, with the latter issue introducing Peter Parker's parents; Annual #10 (Nov. 1976), over Gil Kane; and Annual #22, over Mark Bagley. Esposito additionally inked several issues apiece of The Spectacular Spider-Man; the children's comic Spidey Super Stories; and a host of Spider-Man miscellanea, such as Spider-Man Giveaway: AIM Toothpaste Exclusive Collectors' Edition (1980), and Spider-Man Giveaway: National Committee for Prevention of Child Abuse #1 (1984).

Throughout the 1970s and 1980s, Esposito inked virtually every major Marvel penciler on virtually every major Marvel title, from The Avengers to X-Men. By the mid-1980s, however, his Marvel work had tapered to a trickle. Among his final Spider-Man work, he was co-inker on the story "Moving Up", penciled by Alex Saviuk, in Web of Spider-Man #38 (May 1988); inker of the following issue's cover; and inker of the 11-page partial origin retelling "My Science Project", penciled by Bagley, in The Amazing Spider-Man Annual #23 (1989). His final Spider-Man story was also his last with Andru, who died in 1993: the graphic novel Spider-Man: Fear Itself (Feb. 1992). Esposito's final Marvel tale was the 11-page Darkhold story "Skin", penciled by Dan Lawlis, in the horror comics title Midnight Sons Unlimited #2 (July 1993).

=== Later life and career ===
By this time, however, Esposito was well-ensconced at Archie Comics, inking hundreds of teenage-humor stories starring Archie Andrews, Betty Cooper and the other high-schoolers of Riverdale, U.S.A., generally over the pencils of fellow former longtime Marvel artist Stan Goldberg. In 1992, he reunited with writer Gerry Conway and artist Ross Andru for a story in Web of Spider-Man Annual #6. Also in 1992, the graphic novel Spider-Man: Fear Itself, pencilled by Andru, inked by Esposito, plotted by Conway and scripted by Stan Lee was published. Andru & Esposito's last published work together was for Archie Comics' Zen, Intergalactic Ninja in 1992. Prior to Andru's death in 1993, Esposito was working with Andru on a new project to be called The Strobe Warrior for another independent company founded by Esposito and his assistant N Blake Seals. The project fell apart after Andru's passing but was revived years later in song by a band called Fling Lois. and once again in a graphic novel released in 2020 entitled "The Saga of Evil Monkey Man" by N Blake Seals. Esposito's final Archie work was inking four Goldberg stories in Betty #56 (Dec. 1997). Esposito, discussing this late period, said, "I started working over Stan's pencils, and did so for quite a few years. But as you get older, the pace with which you work becomes a strain. With Ross passing away in 1993, I decided to stop working for publishers and change my directions," turning to commissioned recreations of his old comics work.

=== Personal life ===
Esposito's first wife, Mary, died when he was in his 40s. He later married his second wife, Irene, who died on January 12, 2020. Esposito had two children: Mark, who predeceased him, and Michele. Esposito's grandson, Tyler Esposito, created the online documentary My Retro Life: A Gamer's Documentary, which includes home-video footage of Mike Esposito. Esposito lived in Lake Grove, New York, on Long Island, in his later years, and died October 24, 2010, at age 83.

== Awards ==
Esposito was inducted into the Will Eisner Comic Book Hall of Fame in 2007. In 2021 he was awarded the Inkwell Awards Joe Sinnott Hall of Fame Award.

== Legacy ==
An Andru-Esposito drawing of Wonder Woman appears on one of the 10 character stamps issued in the U.S. Postal Service's 2006 commemorative stamp series "DC Comics Super Heroes".
