= Sol Brodsky =

American comic book artist (1923–1984)

- Cover of Marvel Age 22 (January 1985); Featuring Sol Brodsky, art by John Romita Sr.
- Born: Soloman Brodsky; April 22, 1923 Brooklyn, New York City, New York, U.S.
- Died: June 4, 1984 (aged 61)
- Areas: Penciller, Inker
- Pseudonym: Solly B.
- Spouse: Selma Cohen (m. 1948)

Soloman "Sol" Brodsky (April 22, 1923 – June 4, 1984) was an American comic book artist who, as Marvel Comics' Silver Age production manager, was one of the key architects of the small company's expansion to a major popular culture conglomerate. He later rose to vice president, operations; and vice president, special projects. "Sol was really my right-hand man for years", described Marvel editor and company patriarch Stan Lee.

Brodsky worked primarily behind the scenes, uncredited. His accomplishments include co-creating, with letterer Artie Simek, the long-familiar logo of The Amazing Spider-Man, (Note: The logo was lettered by Simek from a sketch by Brodsky for issue #1. It was modified slightly with #2, and drop-shadow was added with #7. This logo continued to be used into the 21st century. Brodsky also designed the original Fantastic Four and The Avengers logos.) as well as other Marvel logos still in use in the mid-2000s. He was belatedly credited after decades as the inker of Jack Kirby's pencil art for The Fantastic Four #3–4 (March–May 1962) and many other landmark comics.

Lee described Brodsky as "my assistant for years and the company's production head. He could write, he could draw, he could ink — he could do everything."

== Biography ==
=== Early life and career ===
Brodsky inked one of penciler Jack Kirby's most significant comics, The Fantastic Four #3 (March 1962).

Born in Brooklyn, New York City, New York, the son of Abraham and Dora Brodsky, Sol Brodsky was the eldest among siblings Leonard, Ted, and Faye. Determined early in life to pursue cartooning, he took a job sweeping floors at Archie Comics in order to break into the industry. A 1985 tribute feature in the Marvel promotional magazine Marvel Age (pictured above) cites his comic-art debut at age 17 in 1940 "in the comic V-Man" (sic; the comic was actually titled V •••—, using Morse Code, and in any event, the two issues of that Fox Comics title starring the superhero V-Man were cover-dated January and March 1942). Brodsky's earliest confirmed comics credit is inking a six-page Volton story in Holyoke Publishing's Cat-Man Comics vol. 3, #2, a.k.a. #12 (July 1942).

That year Brodsky began his long, if initially intermittent, association with Marvel, writing and drawing four one-page "Inky Dinky" gag strips in Mystic Comics #10 (Aug. 1942) and an additional one in Comedy Comics #11 (Sept. 1952), for the company's 1940s predecessor, Timely Comics. His earliest known cover art is for Holyoke's Blue Beetle #17 (Dec. 1942).

Brodsky served in the U.S. Army Signal Corps during World War II, advancing to the rank of corporal. He was stationed on the USS Fairfax, but that destroyer was decommissioned to become the British Royal Navy ship HMS Richmond on November 26, 1940, more than a year before the US entered the war.

Upon his return from military service, Brodsky created the feature "Red Cross" in Holyoke's aviation series Captain Aero Comics, where it ran as a backup from issues #21-25 (Dec. 1944 - Feb. 1946).

=== Atlas Comics ===
Brodsky in late 1950 or early 1951 — the exact date uncertain due to his work often going unsigned, in the manner of the times — began penciling and inking for Marvel's 1950s forerunner, Atlas Comics. He is tentatively credited as cover artist of Marvel Boy #1-2 (Dec. 1950 - Feb.1951), and confirmably credited through the '50s for covers and occasional stories in issues of Atlas' horror/suspense titles Adventures into Weird Worlds, Strange Tales, and Uncanny Tales; the Westerns Kid Colt, Outlaw, Gunsmoke Western, Western Outlaws, and Wild Western; the satiric Crazy; and such miscellaneous genre titles as Sports Action and Spy Fighters. He also drew the cover of Sub-Mariner Comics #34 (June 1954).

After an Atlas reorganization c. 1954, publisher Martin Goodman eliminated all his comics-division staff except for editor-in-chief Stan Lee. Freelance cartoonist and later longtime Marvel colorist and Millie the Model artist Stan Goldberg recalled, "They needed someone on production to handle things since there was no real staff. I would come in a couple of days a week to help out, but I had a lot of my own freelance stuff, so I couldn't do much. Stan got in touch with Sol. Stan was a one-man department, and with Sol it became a two-man department." As Lee elaborated, "Sol and I were the whole staff of Atlas Comics. I bought the art and scripts and Sol did all the production. My job was mainly talking to the artists and the writers and telling them I wanted the stuff done. Sol did ... the corrections, making sure everything looked right, making sure things went to the engraver and he also talked to the printer. He was really the production manager. And then little by little we built things back up again."

During a 1957 economic entrenchment at the company, Goodman again fired the staff, except for Lee. Brodsky teamed with friend and fellow comic artist Mike Esposito to attempt launching a publishing company. Neither Brodsky's magazine prototypes, which included a rock and roll fan magazine, nor his travel kits for children, containing things to draw, play, and stay amused with during trips, found an investor.

Brodsky had much more success with a series of promotional comic books he created and produced for the Big Boy restaurant chain. Lee would script the majority of these. Brodsky also produced promotional comics for Bird's Eye frozen foods, featuring talking vegetables. In 1958, Brodsky became founding editor of the satirical magazine Cracked.

=== Marvel Comics ===
Until leaving Cracked in 1964 to become Marvel's production manager, Brodsky was concurrently freelancing for Marvel, inking The Fantastic Four #3 (the issue that introduced the team's costumes and other mythos sui generis) and #4 (the return of the Golden Age antihero the Sub-Mariner), among other covers/interiors. As Marvel began to expand with the success of Fantastic Four, The Amazing Spider-Man and other titles, Brodsky's organizational skills and easygoing manner led Lee, by now a friend for several years, to offer him the newly created, formal position of production manager in 1964. When artist Bill Everett, on his return to Marvel after many years in commercial art, turned in Daredevil #1 (April 1964) extremely late, Brodsky and Spider-Man artist Steve Ditko inked "a lot of backgrounds and secondary figures on the fly [and] cobbled the cover and the splash page together from Kirby's original concept drawing."

Roy Thomas described the Marvel offices in 1965 as "just three or four little rooms. Stan's office was as big as everything else put together, and Sol Brodsky, [secretary/receptionist] Flo Steinberg, and [artist/colorist/production person] Marie Severin were crowded into two other little rooms."

Some Marvel humor comics with art credited to Brodsky may not have been his work. As comics historian Mark Evanier notes:

...there were quite a few issues of Millie the Model and other teen comics signed by Sol Brodsky or 'Solly B.' Brodsky was the firm's production manager and an occasional inker, and he did ink a few of the Millie stories that bear his credit. But they were all at least pencilled by Stan Goldberg. At the time, Stan was doing occasional work for the Archie Comics people, and they didn't like to see their artists drawing in that style for other publishers. So when Stan drew teen comics for Marvel, they put Brodsky's name on them in the hope that the Archie editors wouldn't know it was him.

Tales to Astonish #40 (Feb. 1963), a rare interior by the occasional cover-art team of penciler Jack Kirby and inker Sol Brodsky. Ant-Man stars.

=== Skywald Publications and return to Marvel ===
Brodsky spent some time away from Marvel in the early 1970s. In 1970, he and Israel Waldman co-founded Skywald Publications — the company name composed of truncated versions of their last names. Skywald lasted until late 1974; Brosky returned to Marvel sometime in the period 1972 to 1974.

Al Hewetson, who succeeded Brodsky as editor at Skywald, recalled that in 1972 Brodsky had told him, "Marvel has made me an offer to go back and develop their overseas syndication, and I'm going to do it. This is a big opportunity." Brodsky's last credited issues as Skywald editor, and Hewetson's first, are cover-dated August 1972.

One-time Marvel editor-in-chief Jim Shooter, however, recalled that after Skywald went defunct (in late 1974), "Sol needed a job, and approached Stan [Lee], but a new production manager had been hired in Sol’s absence — John Verpoorten. Stan convinced the [then-parent company] Cadence [Industries] board to create a new position for Sol, 'V.P. of Operations'. Essentially, he was Stan's right-hand man again."

Sometime before May 19, 1978 (the date of a letter, put up for auction years later, that Brodsky had sent to a Marvel fan), Brodsky's Marvel Comics title had become vice president, operations.

Later, as vice president, special projects, he oversaw Marvel UK, Marvel Books, and other brand expansions.

== Personal life and death ==
Brodsky married Selma Cohen on November 28, 1948. Their first child, Janice, was born August 7, 1952, and son Gary on March 18, 1957.

Fellow comics artist Allen Bellman recalled in 2005, "Sol and I were close friends. We both lived in Brooklyn and I was already married. ... When Roz and I were married, we moved to the Jersey Shore area of Asbury Park, and Sol and his wife visited us often. He was a warm, good-natured person."

In 1985, one year after his death, Brodsky's son Gary founded the independent-comics company Solson Publications, which published an issue of the T.H.U.N.D.E.R. Agents update T.H.U.N.D.E.R., by writer Michael Sawyer and artist James E. Lyle, plus the short-lived "super-president" spoof series Reagan's Raiders.

Brodsky's daughter, Janice Cohen, has been a Marvel colorist.

Occasional 1970s Marvel writer Allyn Brodsky, who served as assistant to editor-in-chief Stan Lee, following Al Hewetson, is not related.

== Fictional portrayals ==
A fictionalized Brodsky is among the beachgoers gathered around the unconscious Namor in penciler Marie Severin's splash page for The Sub-Mariner #19 (Nov. 1969). As an in-joke, Severin had drawn the Marvel staff (as well as three personal friends) as onlookers. Brodsky is the man in the Hawaiian shirt at lower right, gesturing to the police (and standing in front of a cigar-smoking Mike Esposito).

A fictionalized Brodsky also appeared alongside Lee, Kirby, and Steinberg — all transformed into a Marvel Bullpen version of the Fantastic Four — in the alternate-reality comic What If Vol. 1, #11 (Oct. 1978). Written and drawn by Kirby, the tale featured Brodsky as the Human Torch.

== Audio ==
- pRATt, DOuG (September 23, 2007). The MMMS Records Remastered. Prattling before the Pratfall. — Merry Marvel Marching Society record, including voice of Sol Brodsky
