= Skywald Publications =

Defunct American comics and magazine publisher

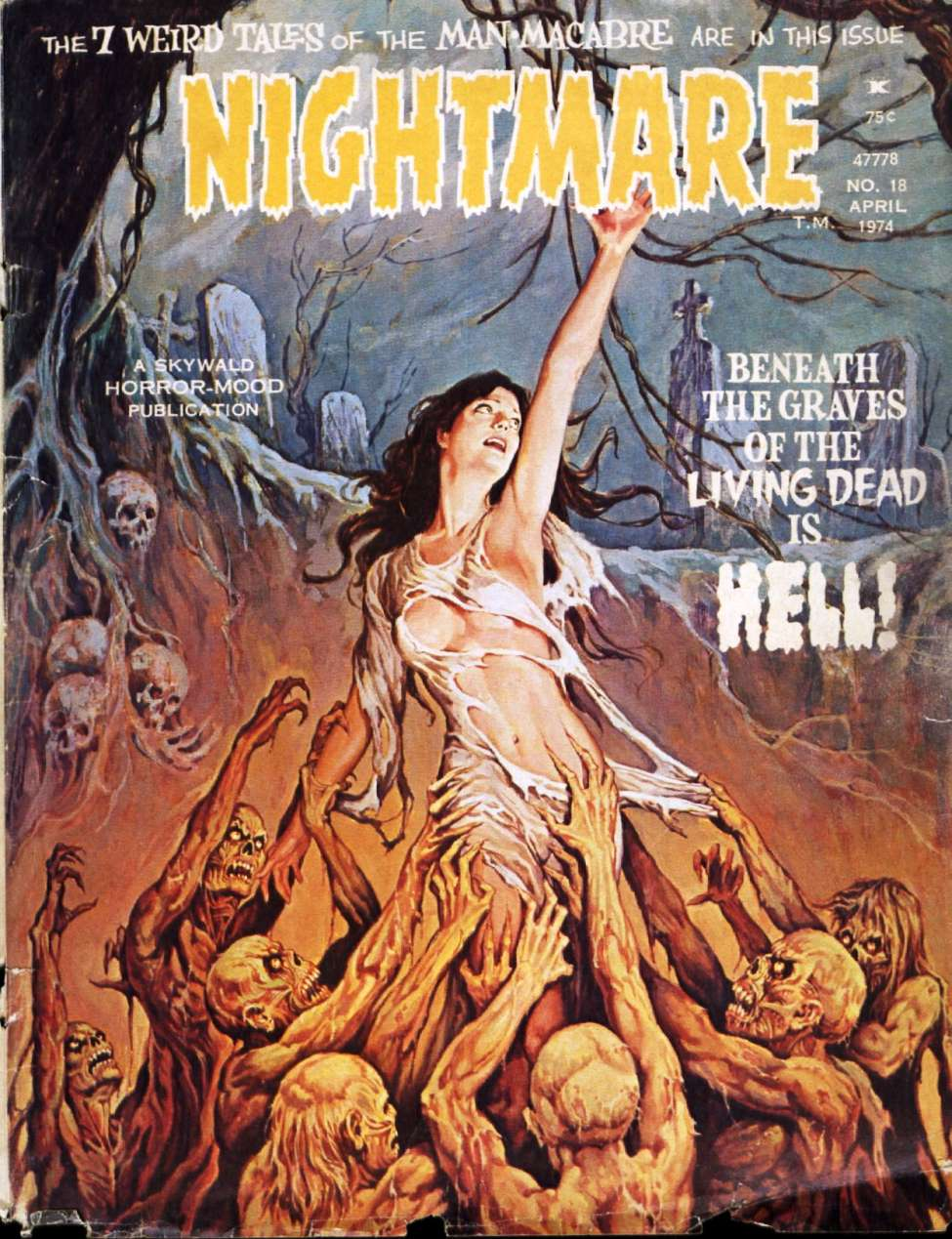
- Nightmare #18 (Aug. 1974). Cover art by José Antonio Domingo, as "JAD"
- Founded: 1970
- Founder: Sol Brodsky; Israel Waldman
- Defunct: 1975
- Country of origin: United States
- Headquarters location: New York City
- Key people: Al Hewetson, Herschel Waldman
- Publication types: Black-and-white comics magazines, comic books
- Fiction genres: Horror, Western

Skywald Publications was an American publisher of black-and-white comics magazines, primarily the horror anthologies Nightmare, Psycho, and Scream. It also published a small line of comic books and other genre magazines. Skywald's original comics were similar in appearance and quality to rival black-and-white publisher Warren Publishing, and even employed many of the same creators. Skywald operated from 1970 to 1975.

Comics professionals who produced work for the Skywald magazines include writers T. Casey Brennan, Gerry Conway, Steve Englehart, Gardner Fox, Gary Friedrich, Doug Moench, Dave Sim, Len Wein, and Marv Wolfman; and artists Rich Buckler, Gene Day, Vince Colletta, Bill Everett, Bruce Jones, Pablo Marcos, Syd Shores, Chic Stone, and Tom Sutton. Many who also contributed to rival Warren employed pseudonyms. Future industry star John Byrne published his first professional story, a two-pager written by editor Al Hewetson, in Skywald's Nightmare #20 (Aug. 1974).

== History ==
=== Founding ===
The company name is a combination of those of its founders, former Marvel Comics production manager Sol Brodsky ("Sky") and low-budget entrepreneur Israel Waldman ("wald"), whose I. W. Publications (also known as Super Comics) in the late 1950s and early 1960s published unauthorized comic book reprints for sale through grocery and discount stores. Skywald was based in New York City.

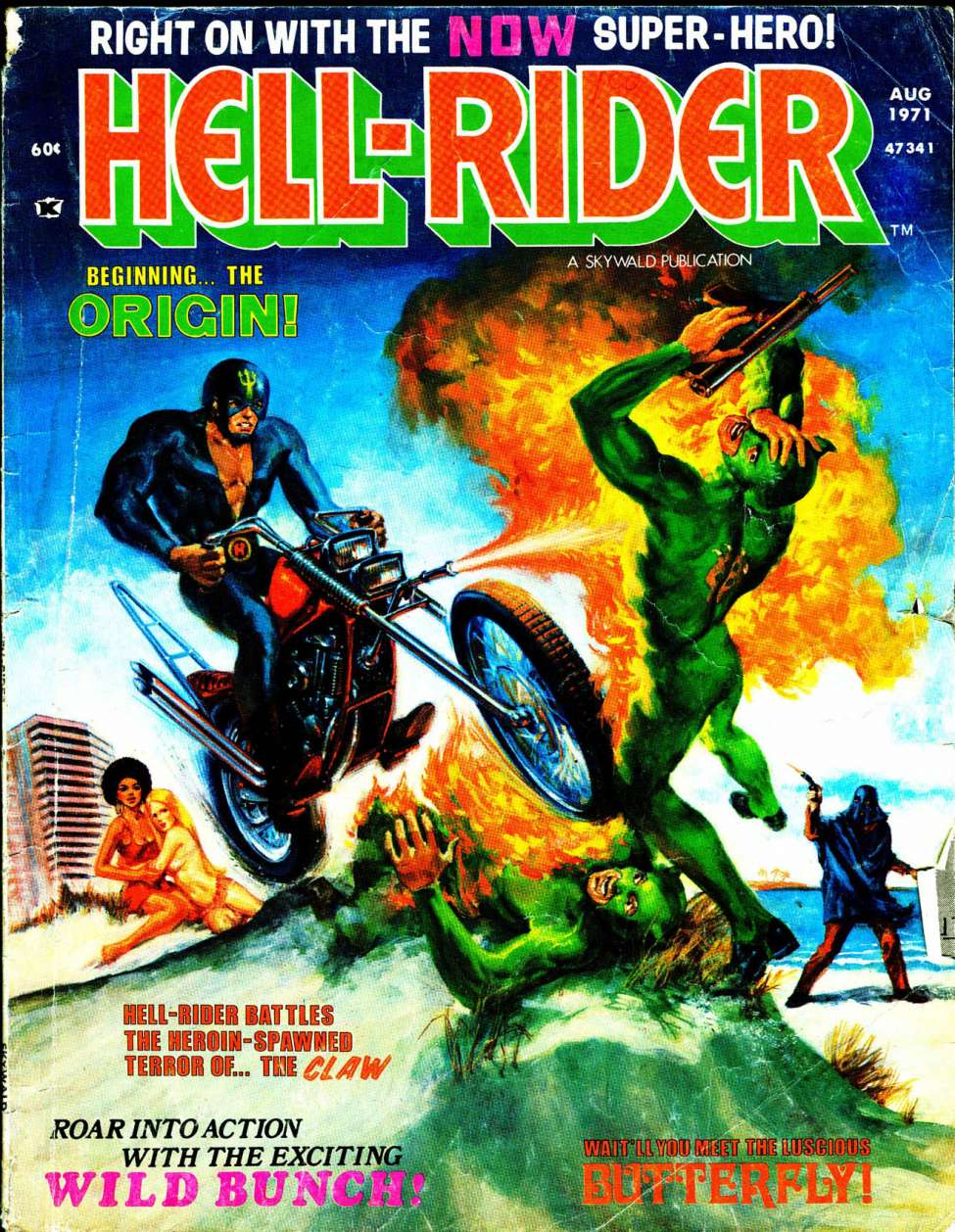
Hell-Rider #1 (Aug. 1971). Painted cover by Harry Rosenbaum.

Brodsky, who also served as editor, brought in Al Hewetson – briefly an assistant to Marvel chief Stan Lee and a freelancer for the Warren Publishing horror magazines and others – as a freelance writer. "Archaic Al", as he later jokingly called himself in print, quickly became the associate editor, and when Brodsky returned to Marvel after a few months, Hewetson succeeded him as editor. Hewetson, aiming at a more literary bent than the work of industry leader Warren Publishing, developed what he called "the Horror-Mood" and sought to evoke the feel of such writers as Poe, H. P. Lovecraft and Kafka.

Skywald's first publication was Nightmare #1 (cover-dated Dec. 1970). The first issues of magazines like Nightmare and Psycho featured some original work and a lot of reworked reprint filler, mostly from horror comics published by Avon Comics in the 1950s.

In an unusual arrangement, Hewetson managed editorial from his home in St. Catharines, Ontario, Canada, though the publisher was based in Manhattan. As he described in 1973,

"I write my stories, and edit others' stories, and send them directly to the various artists. The art is sent to New York, when finished, where I collate it. I produce all the editorial production here at home, and when I visit New York I package the entire magazine and do the production for it. And then, in an incredible fat bundle, I mail the thing off to our printers who have nothing to do but perhaps add the occasional, miscellaneous screen and make the negatives for the magazine. Blueprint proofs of those negatives are sent to me which I proof editorially and I make certain changes and approve the package. And the magazine is then printed in Canada and then shipped to Connecticut and from there to various distribution centers, including back to Canada."

=== Non-horror magazines ===
Skywald also produced two issues of the magazine Hell-Rider (Aug. and Oct. 1971), featuring a vigilante motorcyclist with a flamethrower-equipped bike. The character was created by Gary Friedrich (who would go on to co-create the Marvel motorcyclist Ghost Rider) and penciler Ross Andru. Backup features were "The Butterfly" and "The Wild Bunch", both written by Friedrich, with art credits disputed by different sources for issue #1; the second-issue "Butterfly" story is credited to penciler Syd Shores and inker Esposito, the second "Wild Bunch" to penciler-inker Rich Buckler.

Judy Garland tribute magazine (1970). Cover artist unknown

Another two-issue title, The Crime Machine, consisted solely of comic-book crime fiction reprints from the 1950s. A remaining title, Science Fiction Odyssey, was planned for September 1971 publication, but withdrawn; some of its stories eventually appeared in the horror magazines.

The company also published a small number of magazines unrelated to horror or comics. Among these was Judy Garland (1970), a "special tribute issue". Hewetson said in 1973, "We produced, when this company began, a production called The Judy Garland Book which is the most threatening thing which ever happened to our company. We printed far too many copies and we sold maybe four or five. We lost a lot of money."

Skywald published two issues of the men's adventure title King: The Magazine for the Man's Man in 1971; the first issue featured a Harry Rosenbaum cover and interior illustration by Boris Vallejo.

=== Comic books ===
The short-lived color comic-book line, edited by Brodsky, comprised the Western titles Blazing Six-Guns, The Bravados, Butch Cassidy, The Sundance Kid, and Wild Western Action; the romance title Tender Love Stories; the horror series The Heap; and Jungle Adventures. These all were combinations of new material and reprints. Contributors, in addition to some of those noted above, included Dick Ayers, Mike Friedrich, Jack Katz, John Severin, and John Tartaglione. Notably, The Sundance Kid #1–2 (June–July 1971) contained Jack Kirby Western reprints from Bullseye #2–3 (Oct. and Dec. 1954). None of the comics lasted more than three issues, except the romance comic Tender Love Stories, which ran four.

"The color comics, more or less, broke even," Hewetson said in 1973. "I think we could've continued with them to try and establish a color comics area, except for the fact that, at the very same time as Skywald began the color comics, National and Marvel were engaged in a price war which hurt just about everybody."

=== Demise ===
Editor Al Hewetson, in an interview given shortly before his death of a heart attack on January 6, 2004, asserted the demise of Skywald was caused by:

...Marvel's distributor [Curtis Circulation]. Our issues were selling well, and some sold out. Such returns as we received were shipped overseas, mainly to England, where they sold out completely... When Marvel entered the game with countless [black-and-white horror] titles gutting [sic] the newsstand, their distributor was so powerful they denied Skywald access to all but the very largest newsstands, so our presence was minimal and fans and readers simply couldn't find us. ... The Waldmans [Israel and business manager Herschel Waldman] and I had a business lunch with our distributor in the fall of '74 and we were given very specific information about the state of affairs on the newsstands — which had nothing to do with Warren's or Skywald's solid readership base.

Skywald lasted through early 1975, with Psycho #24 (March 1975) being its final publication. Nightmare published 23 issues and Scream put out 11 issues.
