= Welcome to the Jungle (comics) =

Book by Jim Butcher

- Author: Jim Butcher
- Illustrator: Ardian Syaf
- Cover artist: Ardian Syaf and Christian McGrath
- Language: English
- Series: The Dresden Files
- Genre: Science fiction, fantasy
- Publisher: Del Rey/Dabel Brothers Publishing
- Publication date: October 14, 2008
- Publication place: United States
- Media type: Print (graphic novel)
- Pages: 160
- ISBN: 0-345-50746-0
- OCLC: 191922693
- Followed by: Storm Front

Welcome to the Jungle is a 2008 hardback graphic novel written by science fiction and fantasy author Jim Butcher and illustrated by Ardian Syaf. Set in the world of Butcher's contemporary fantasy/mystery novel series, The Dresden Files, Welcome to the Jungle was written as a prequel to the first novel, Storm Front. It was nominated for a Hugo Award in the Best Graphic Novel category.

== Plot ==
A security guard at Chicago's Lincoln Park Zoo is brutally mauled to death; normally the city authorities would not consider this very important, but the guard is the son of a prominent politician. The Zoo's administrators accuse Moe, the zoo's alpha gorilla, of the murder and schedule him for euthanasia. Under pressure from her superiors and the mayor's office to close the case, Lt. Murphy calls in Harry Dresden, Chicago's only consulting wizard. She needs him to find the real killer within 24 hours.

When Dresden interviews the zoo staff, he encounters anger and outright hostility from many of them, who blame him for the administration's decision to kill Moe. Finally, Dresden is able to interview Dr. Reese, Director of the Gorilla Program and later he meets Reese's assistant, Willamena "Will" Rogers. Dresden tells Reese that he doesn't believe Moe to be guilty.

Later, Dresden and Will are attacked in Reese's office by a pack of various jungle cats (lions, leopards, and tigers). Dresden knows that only a powerful magical spell could make that many big cats hunt in a pack, and breaks the spell with running water. The zoo is closed so the staff can round up all the escaped cats. Suspecting one of the staff, Dr. Watson, Dresden takes advantage of the cat roundup to break into her office. He find a casting circle on the floor, the residue of powerful magical workings, and a filing cabinet with ritual jars full of animal blood.

Back at his apartment laboratory, Dresden shows one of the ritual jars to Bob, his oracular skull, who deciphers the runes on the jar as part of an ascension ritual for a Hecatean hag. Dresden must stop the ritual before the transformation takes place and the hag acquires near-godlike abilities. When Dresden and Will return to the zoo, they discover Watson's office burned, incinerating all the ritual evidence. Next, they find Moe sitting next to Reese's corpse. Dresden is afraid to approach the agitated Moe, but Will calms him down and eases him back into his cage.

Finding a hair on Reese's corpse, Dresden performs a tracking spell. The trail leads him to "Undertown", the maze of caves, discontinued subway tunnels and abandoned streets below Chicago. En route, he is attacked and his car is severely battered by a hellhound. Dresden blasts the monster to a thousand pieces and continues following the trail. He surprises and disables the hag, discovering too late that she was only one of a sisterhood of four. The remaining three hags encircle and attack Dresden. He defeats two of them and breaks the ritual circle. With her sisters dead and her ascension rite broken, Watson vows revenge and escapes. Dresden follows her with the tracking spell, which leads him back to the zoo, where he finds Watson holding Will hostage. Exhausted and badly wounded, Dresden has just enough energy to open the door of Moe's cage. Recognizing Dr. Reese's killer and seeing her threatening Will, Moe attacks. Watson's magical power and inhuman strength are no match for Moe's raw ferocity, and she is quickly ripped to pieces.

When the police arrive, Dresden and Will tell Murphy that Watson attacked them. Later, evidence taken from Reese's corpse implicates Watson and clears Moe. Murphy is not pleased that Watson is not alive to be arrested, and is sure that Dresden knows more than he is telling, but she agrees to pay his consulting fee.

== List of characters ==
=== Returning characters ===
- Harry Dresden: the protagonist and a professional wizard.
- Lieutenant Karrin Murphy: the Director of Special Investigations, Chicago PD.
- Detective Ron Carmichael: Murphy's partner at SI.
- Justin DuMorne: a deceased Dresden's former mentor, teacher, and foster father.
- Elaine Mallory: a Dresden's foster sister, co-apprentice and first love (lying next to DuMorne, not saying a word, not given a name in the story, thought to be deceased).
- Mister: Dresden's 30+ pound house cat.
- Bob: an intelligent air spirit who resides within a skull in Dresden's sub-basement laboratory.

=== New characters ===
- Maurice Sandbourne: a deceased zoo security guard and the son of a prominent Chicago politician.
- Dr. Dana Watson: an animal expert on loan from London, working in the big cat exhibit.
- Dr. Reese: director of the Gorilla Program.
- Willamena "Will" Rogers: Dr. Reese's assistant.
- Moe: The alpha male gorilla in the Big Ape House at the Lincoln Park zoo.
- Two hags: sisters of Dr. Watson.

== Publication history ==
Welcome to the Jungle was released as a four-part, monthly comic mini-series by Dabel Brothers Publishing (April - July 2008) and as a paperback on July 24, 2009 by Titan Books Ltd, ISBN 1-84856-209-8.
