= Ardian Syaf =

Indonesian comic book artist

- Born: Tulungagung, East Java, Indonesia
- Area: Penciller
- Notable works: Batgirl, Brightest Day and Welcome to the Jungle

Ardian Syaf is an Indonesian comic book artist. He has worked for DC Comics, Marvel Comics, and Dynamite Entertainment.

In April 2017 he became embroiled in controversy for inserting hidden antisemitic and anti-Christian messages in X-Men Gold #1, for which his contract with Marvel Comics was terminated.

== Early life ==
Ardian Syaf was born in Tulungagung, East Java, Indonesia. He first developed the desire to draw comics in his youth, after his father bought him his first comic. Among his influences are Hermann Huppen, a Belgian comics artist for whom Syaf has expressed admiration. He embarked upon a career as a professional comics artist in 2003, deciding that leaving his interest in drawing comics and working in a conventional job was not something he was willing to do.

== Career ==
Syaf started his career in 2007 with Dabel Brothers Publishing, illustrating The Dresden Files for 11 issues. Syaf's work on the 2008 graphic novel Welcome to the Jungle was nominated for the 2008 Hugo Award for Best Graphic Story, losing to Girl Genius. Take a Chance, written by novelist C. E. Murphy was published after that, although it had been written and drawn first. Syaf later signed to the Spanish agency, Utopia Studio.

At one point Syaf met an Irish screenwriter named Catie through Dabel Brothers, through which began to get work with Marvel Comics, his earliest book assignments involving the sharing of penciling duties with other artists, such as Jorge Molina on X-Men: Manifest Destiny: Nightcrawler #1 (May 2009), and Leonard Kirk on Captain Britain and MI13 #13 and 14 (July, August 2009). His earliest work for DC Comics was "The Origin of Congorilla" a backup story written by Len Wein that appeared in Justice League: Cry for Justice #1 (September 2009). He shared the art duties on Justice League of America (Vol. 2) #34 (August 2009) with Eddy Barrows, but its quality was decried by critics.

In 2009, he signed a two-year exclusivity contract with DC. That contract ended in September 2011, though he indicated that it would be renewed, and that he would be drawing the Batgirl series as part of the company's 2011 reboot of its books, The New 52, working with writer Gail Simone. During his run on that series, Simone set one storyline in an Indonesian neighborhood of Gotham City in order to exploit Syaf's experience. Syaf drew eight of that series' first nine issues, receiving generally positive reviews from critics. His artwork for the premiere issue in particular drew praise by Iann Robinson of CraveOnline for the manner in which Syaf adapted his style during different parts of the story, effecting a "light and airy" during the daytime scenes with Barbara Gordon, a darker, shadowy look for in-costume scenes, and a grainy, old-fashioned cinematic appearance for the flashbacks.

When asked in a 2011 interview what projects he would like to work on, Syaf responded that he would like to draw Wolverine, as that is a character that he adores. He also stated that he would like to do a Tomb Raider story set in Indonesia, which would involve the superstitious beliefs of his home country.

=== Easter egg references and X-Men Gold controversy ===
Syaf is known to engage in the practice of hiding Easter egg references to political figures in the backgrounds of his artwork. In Batgirl (Vol 4) #9 (July 2012), for example, Syaf included a storefront sign that referenced the President of Indonesia, Joko Widodo, although the text that accompanies the image of Widodo in Syaf's penciled artwork is covered by a caption in the final, published issue.

In April 2017, Syaf was at the center of controversy for including multiple Easter eggs in X-Men Gold #1 (June 2017) that referenced the November 2016 Jakarta protests against Basuki Tjahaja Purnama, the governor of Jakarta, which were viewed by readers as anti-Semitic and anti-Christian. Being both ethnically Chinese and Christian in the Muslim-dominated Indonesia, where Christians and Chinese are targets of racism and discrimination, and only the second Chinese Christian governor of Jakarta since 1965, Basuki had been the target of racism by Islamist hardliners. In a 27 September 2016 speech Basuki stated that some citizens were being discouraged from voting for him by politicians citing Verse 51 of the fifth chapter of the Quran out of context for political reasons. The verse, Quran Surah 5:51, or QS 5:51, is commonly translated in Indonesian as "Muslims should not appoint the Jews and Christians as their leader." The quran.com translation reads, "O you who have believed, do not take the Jews and the Christians as allies. They are [in fact] allies of one another. And whoever is an ally to them among you—then indeed, he is [one] of them. Indeed, Allah guides not the wrongdoing people." Citizens and pundits reacted to Basuki's statement as an insult to the Quran, in part because one of the videos of the speech uploaded to the Internet was edited in a way that changed the meaning of his words. Although Basuki publicly apologized for offending anyone with the remark, the resulting outcry over it led to calls for him to be arrested and prosecuted under laws prohibiting insult to religion. It also sparked protests, led by the hardline group Islamic Defenders Front (FPI), including one on 2 December 2016, which was attended by Syaf, who called it "memorable". Basuki's blasphemy trial began on 13 December.

The two panels from X-Men Gold #1 into which Syaf placed references to the November 2016 Jakarta protests. Note the word "Jewelry", and the numbers "212" and "51" in the detail from Pages 10 and 11 (left), and the "QS:5:51" on Colossus' shirt in Panel 2 from Page 12 (right).

On the double-page spread of Pages 10 and 11 of X-Men Gold #1, in which the Jewish X-Man Kitty Pryde appeals to a crowd of people for tolerance, Syaf's art places Kitty's head next to the word "Jewelry" on a storefront awning in the background, such that the last letters of the word are partially obstructed. The number "212", a reference to the 2 December protest, is prominently placed on another store's awning. The number "51" is seen on the baseball cap of one of the people in the crowd, and on the shirt of another, a reference to the Quranic verse 5:51 at the center of the Indonesia protests. The third panel on that spread features a male bystander with a shirt reading "AL M", which may be a reference to Al-Maidah 51, another way to designate the controversial verse. In the second panel of Page 12, the X-Man Colossus wears a shirt prominently displaying the text "QS 5:51". This led to an outcry on social media on Saturday, April 8, three days after the book's publication, by readers who viewed the verse as support of intolerance towards other religions. Syaf was also angrily denounced by Marvel writer G. Willow Wilson, a Muslim herself, who wrote an essay elucidating the verse and warning of the danger of the conservative Indonesian interpretation of it. The Easter eggs also drew negative reaction from Syaf's fellow Indonesian comics creators.

The perceived inappropriateness of these messages stemmed in part from the fact X-Men storylines have traditionally served as allegories warning of the dangers of bigotry since their creation in 1963 by Stan Lee and Jack Kirby (both of whom were Jewish themselves), with the characters themselves (including the Jewish Kitty Pryde and Catholic Nightcrawler, a former priest) serving as stand-ins for oppressed minority groups. Regarding the meaning of these details in his artwork, Syaf cautioned against believing what is read on social media, but encouraged readers to buy the issue, as it would become a rare collectible. He eventually acknowledged the political nature of the hidden messages, though he denied that they were an expression of intolerance on his part, stating, "I don't hate Jews and Christians... I have a many good friends [among them] too." Syaf, who had previously posted a detail of the pencils for the double page spread on his Facebook page, removed them following the criticism leveled at him. Marvel Comics released the following statement in response to the controversy:

The mentioned artwork in X-Men Gold #1 was inserted without knowledge behind its reported meanings. These implied references do not reflect the views of the writer, editors or anyone else at Marvel and are in direct opposition of the inclusiveness of Marvel Comics and what the X-Men have stood for since their creation. This artwork will be removed from subsequent printings, digital versions, and trade paperbacks and disciplinary action is being taken.

On April 11, Syaf's contract with Marvel was terminated. That decision was noted for both the swiftness with which Marvel issued it—on a Saturday, hours after the X-Men Gold art became a point of discussion on social media—and the definitive condemnation of the implied statements in the issue. The writer of the series, Marc Guggenheim, who is himself Jewish, responded to the situation on Saturday by referring readers to Marvel's statement, and tweeting, "The support has been amazing. From fans and pros alike." Syaf reacted to this development by removing his Facebook fan page, and stating on his personal Facebook page, "My career is over now. It's the consequence what I did, and I take it. Please no more mockery, [debate], no more hate. I hope all in peace." Syaf explained that the Quran verse and protest reference that he hid in the comic was intended as a message of "justice" and "love." The following day, in an interview with the Indonesian newspaper Jawa Pos, Syaf explained why he thought Marvel did not accept his explanation for including the Easter egg references, saying, "But Marvel is owned by Disney. When Jews are offended, there is no mercy". After making this remark, he reiterated that he was not anti-Semitic or anti-Christian stating that if he was, he would not have worked for a foreign publisher. On his Facebook page, he posted a photo of himself posing with Rizieq Shihab, the founder and leader of the hardline Islamic Defenders Front (FPI), a former urban vigilante organization turned pressure group that has been criticized for religious and racial propaganda, hate crimes, discrimination against minority groups and religious intolerance, and which led the anti-Basuki protests. Syaf then deleted the photo, and blocked his Facebook page to non-friends.

The controversy resulted in an April 8 retailer rush demand for the book, which quickly sold out. The issue was still available for re-order through Diamond Comic Distributors, but Diamond was sold out by April 9. On eBay, the standard $4.99 USD version of the book sold for up to $7.00 while a premiere variant, of which stores were only permitted two copies each, sold for $45 as of April 9, with up to 70 copies posted on the auction website on April 8, compared to 12 the day before.

== Published work ==
=== DC ===
==== Artist ====
- Aquaman #15
- Batgirl #1 – #13 and #0
- Batman and Robin Annual #1 (with various others)
- Batman: Night of the Owls (with various others)
- Birds of Prey #7
- Brightest Day #17 – #24
- Catwoman Annual 1 (with various others)
- Green Lantern: The End (with various others)
- Green Lantern: Wrath of the First Lantern (with various others)
- Red Lanterns #0
- Superman: The Reign of Doomsday (with various others)

==== Penciller ====
- Action Comics #900
- Batgirl #1 – #9
- Birds of Prey #7
- Blackest Night: Batman #1 – #3
- Blackest Night: Black Lantern Corps #1 – #3
- Blackest Night: Rise of the Black Lanterns #0
- Brightest Day #1 – #5, #7, #8, #13, #17, #18 and #24
- Flashpoint: Emperor Aquaman #1 – #3
- Green Lantern #63
- Green Lantern Corps #48 – #52
- Justice League of America #34
- Justice League: Cry for Justice #1 and #5
- Justice Society of America: 80-Page Giant 2010 (with various others)
- Red Hood and the Outlaws #17
- Superman/Batman #68 – #70
- Superman: Earth One #3
- The Phantom Stranger #42
- Titans #23

==== Inker ====
- Action Comics #900
- Green Lantern #63

==== Colorist ====
- Batgirl #7 – #9
- Blackest Night: Rise of the Black Lanterns #0
- Brightest Day Aftermath: The Search #1 – #3
- Flashpoint: Emperor Aquaman #1 – #3
- Flashpoint: Reverse Flash #1
- Green Lantern: Brightest Day
- Green Lantern Corps #49 – #52
- Superman/Batman #68 – #71, #74
- The Phantom Stranger #42

=== Marvel ===
- X-Men: Manifest Destiny: Nightcrawler #1
- Captain Britain and MI-13 Vol 1 No's 13 and 14
- Official Handbook of the Marvel Universe A To Z Update (2010) #1 (with various others)

=== Other publishers ===
- Welcome to the Jungle 2008 hardback graphic novel written by science fiction and fantasy author Jim Butcher. Part of The Dresden Files series. It was nominated for a Hugo Award in the Best Graphic Novel category.
- Storm Front, Volume 1: The Gathering Storm. Dynamite Entertainment
- Storm Front, Volume 2: Maelstrom. Dynamite Entertainment
- Take a Chance (2009) a five-issue comic series for Dabel Brothers written by C. E. Murphy (fantasy book author).
- Covers of Evil Ernie: Origin of Evil 1–6 (2012). Dynamite Entertainment
- Crepusculon – various pin-ups. Panini Comics
