= Michael Lent =

Michael Lent may refer to:

- Michael Lent (visual artist)
- Michael Lent (writer and producer)
