= Adam Kubert =

American comics artist (born 1959)

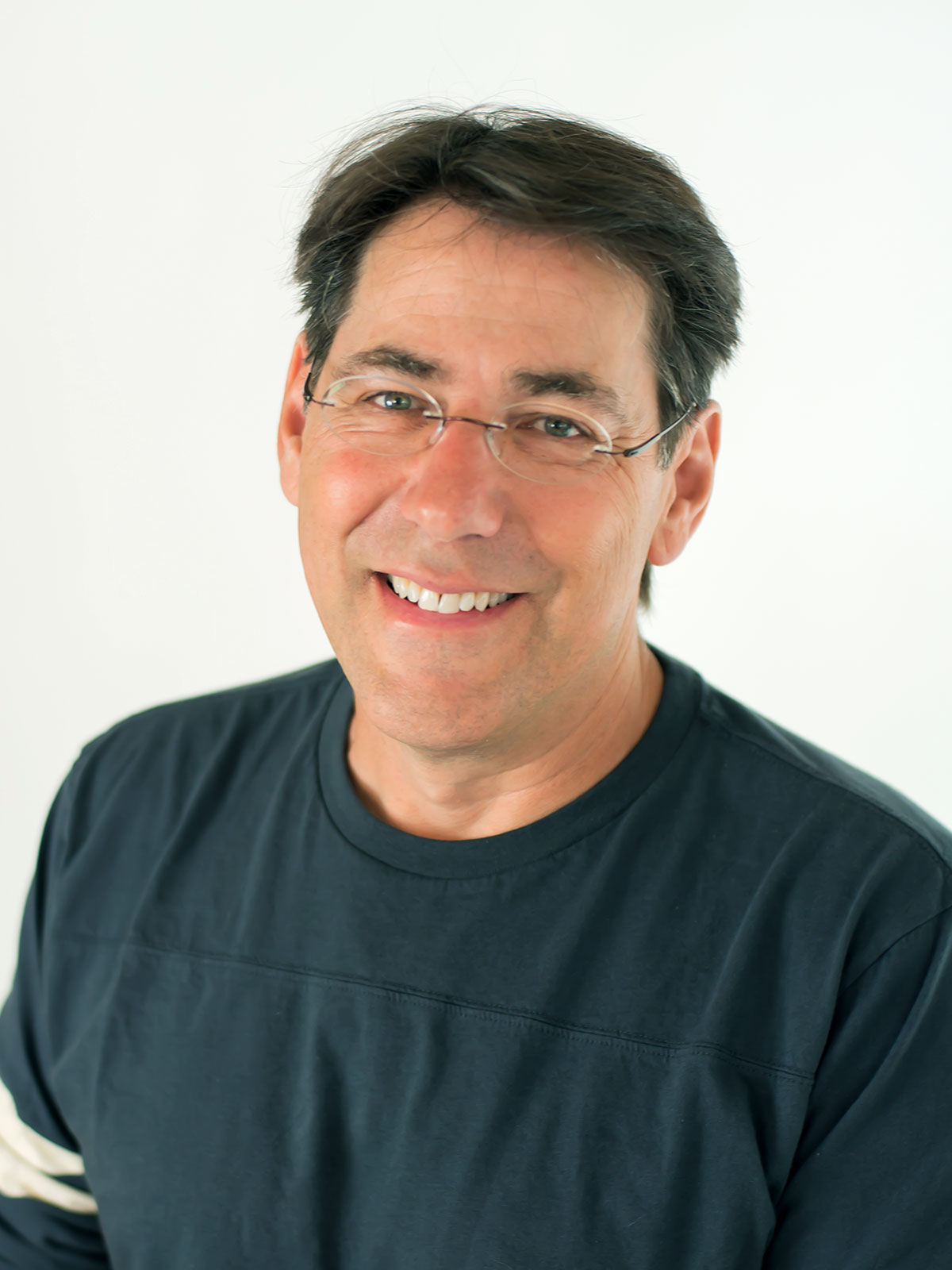
- Born: 1959 (age 66–67) Dover, New Jersey, U.S.
- Areas: Penciller, Inker
- Notable works: Action Comics; The Incredible Hulk; Ultimate X-Men; Uncanny X-Men
- Awards: Eisner Award, 1992

Adam Kubert (/ˈkjuːbərt/; born 1959) is an American comics artist known for his work for publishers such as Marvel Comics and DC Comics, including work on Action Comics, Astonishing Spider-Man & Wolverine, The Incredible Hulk, Ultimate Fantastic Four, Ultimate X-Men, and Wolverine.

Kubert was rated by Wizard magazine as one of the "Hot 10 Writers and Artists" in the industry in 2008. He is the son of Joe Kubert and brother of Andy Kubert, both comic book artists as well, and the uncle of comics editor Katie Kubert. Born in Dover, New Jersey, he is an instructor at the Joe Kubert School located there, which Joe Kubert founded, and at which he and Andy studied.

== Early life ==
Adam Kubert was born in 1959, the son of Muriel (née Fogelson) and Joe Kubert. His siblings include a sister, Lisa, and brothers David, Daniel, and Andrew. Comics editor Katie Kubert is his niece. He and his siblings grew up in Dover, New Jersey. He began his professional comics career at age 12 as a letterer. He attended the Rochester Institute of Technology and graduated with a degree in medical illustration. He subsequently attended his father's The Kubert School in Dover, New Jersey.

== Career ==
Adam Kubert began his comics career as an occasional letterer for DC Comics in late 1977. His first credited work as a colorist came in 1982, in the Dr. Fate backup feature in The Flash #310. His first credited artwork for the company is the story "Gremlins" published in Sgt. Rock #394 (Nov. 1984). In 1988, Adam Kubert drew the Jezebel Jade limited series, a spin-off from the Jonny Quest series, for Comico. He collaborated with his brother on Adam Strange (1990) and the Batman Versus Predator intercompany crossover (1992).

=== Marvel Comics ===
Cover to Uncanny X-Men #377 (Feb. 2000). Art by Adam Kubert.

Adam Kubert is known for his work at Marvel Comics. From 1993 to 1996 he illustrated 17 issues of writer Larry Hama's run on Wolverine between issues #75 to 102. His first issue on the series featured the after-effects of Magneto removing the adamantium from Wolverine's body. Kubert drew the Weapon X limited series as part of the "Age of Apocalypse" storyline in 1995. The following year, he drew the Onslaught: X-Men and Onslaught: Marvel Universe one-shots which lead into the "Heroes Reborn" crossover. From 1997 to 1998 he illustrated 12 issues of Peter David's run on The Incredible Hulk from #454 to 467, as well as the -1 issue (July 1997). From late 1998 to early 1999 Kubert drew X-Men #81 - 84, on which he was teamed up with European colourist Richard Isanove, who subsequently followed Kubert to Ultimate X-Men, employing the pencils-to-color approach seen on most of Ultimate X-Men covers.

In 2001, Kubert drew the new Ultimate X-Men title, penciling the first four issues, and then illustrating 16 various issues beginning with #7, before leaving the title with issue #33 (July 2003). In 2004, he began a run on Ultimate Fantastic Four, once again with writers Mark Millar and Brian Michael Bendis, illustrating that series' first six issues, and then issues 13-18.

=== DC Comics ===
Both Kubert and his brother Andy signed exclusive contracts with DC Comics in June 2005. Kubert's first project for DC was illustrating "Last Son", a Superman story arc co-written by Geoff Johns and Richard Donner, which ran in Action Comics #844–847, 851 and Action Comics Annual #11. Further delay forced DC Comics to bring in substitute creative teams and delay the fourth part of the "Last Son" storyline and the 3D issue to #851, which was released in early July 2007. The final part of the storyline was in Action Comics Annual #11. Following his work on Superman he penciled the "Final Crisis" tie-in, DC Universe: Last Will and Testament, written by Brad Meltzer.

His last work for his latest tenure at DC was the Batman and The Outsiders Special, released in February 2009. This issue, written by Peter Tomasi, highlighted Alfred Pennyworth's efforts to recruit a new team of Outsiders in the wake of Batman's apparent death. After the release of the comic book, Kubert said he was pleased with his work at DC and had done, "what [he] set out to do," which was to draw Superman.

=== Return to Marvel ===
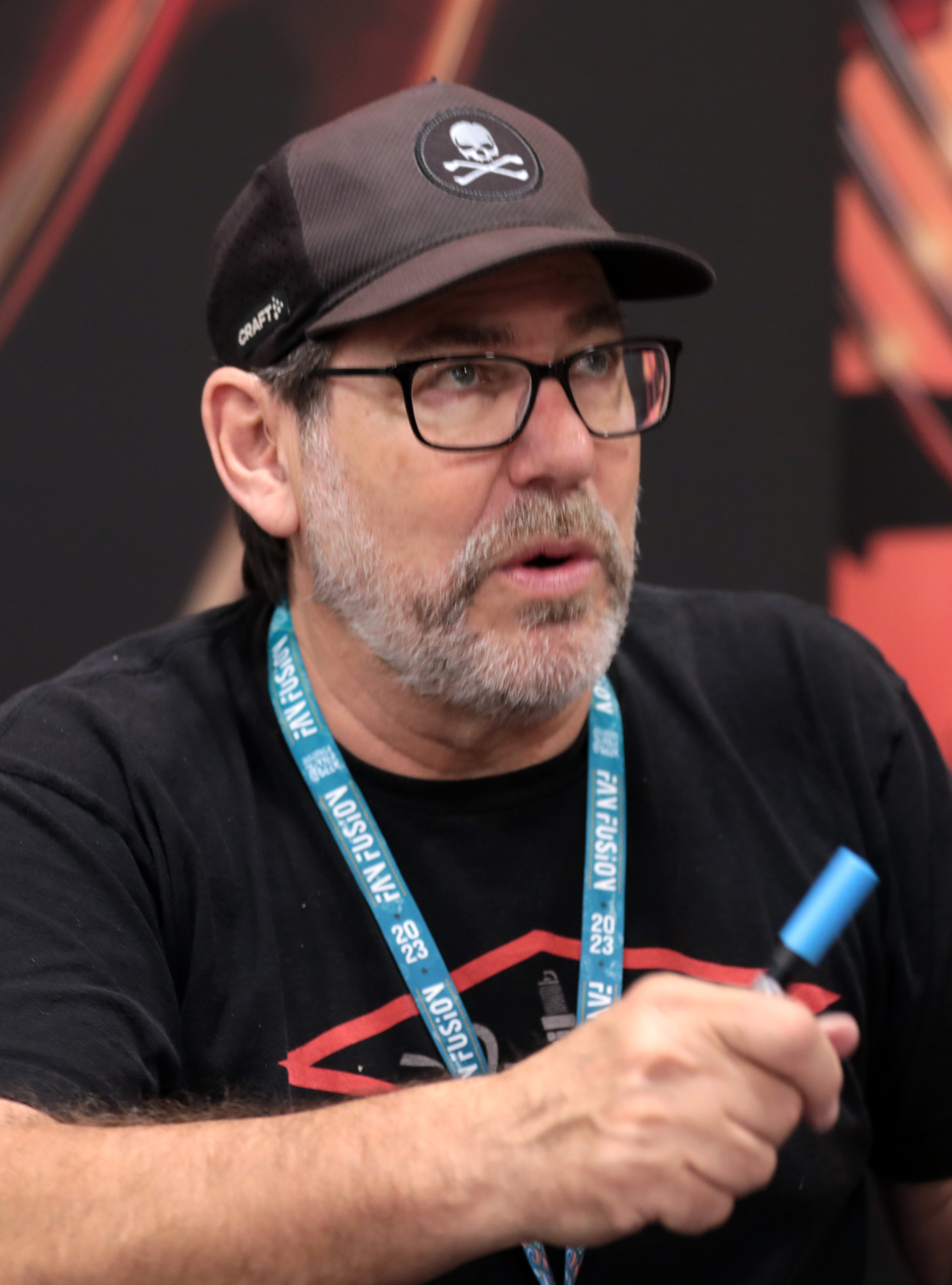
Kubert at the 2023 Phoenix Fan Fusion.

May 2009 marked Adam Kubert's return to Marvel, his first interior work being published as one of two stories in Wolverine #73 and 74. Following this he contributed several covers to New Mutants and Wolverine: Weapon X, and pencilled the "Dark Reign" tie in, The List: Amazing Spider-Man.

When he returned to pencilling for Marvel, he continued to do some work for DC, contributing the stories for the Wednesday Comics "Sgt. Rock" feature, drawn by his father. He has since stated that he is Marvel-exclusive, but they are allowed him to work on the "Sgt. Rock" feature as he had signed on to do it before his contract at DC had expired. Kubert's next job was providing pencils on Astonishing Spider-Man & Wolverine. In 2012, Kubert pencilled issues #8–10 and #12 of the Marvel crossover miniseries Avengers vs. X-Men. He then drew issues #4–6 of Jonathan Hickman's run on The Avengers.

In June 2017, Kubert began penciling Peter Parker: The Spectacular Spider-Man written by Chip Zdarsky. The revamped title being billed as a “back-to-basics” approach for the character.

In February 2020, Kubert and writer Benjamin Percy were the creative team on a new Wolverine series that debuted as part of the Marvel's Dawn of X relaunch the X-Men line of comics. The series was Wolverine's first ongoing series since his resurrection following the Hunt For Wolverine one-shot and Return of Wolverine miniseries. Issue #1 was best-selling comic for the month of February 2020.

=== Teaching work ===
Kubert and his brother Andy teach at The Kubert School, which was founded by their father, who also taught there before his passing in 2012.

In 2024 Kubert acted as one of the mentors for the second year of the Marvel Art Atelier program, held at Disney Hotel New York - The Art of Marvel near Disneyland Paris.

== Archive ==
Kubert donated an archive of his and his father's work to the Cary Graphic Arts Collection, a rare book library at his alma mater, Rochester Institute of Technology (RIT), in Henrietta, New York. The archive includes process work and finished art, as well as his father's drafting table, which is on permanent exhibit. The Kubert Archive joins other comic archives at the Cary Collection, such as a synchronic collection of every comic book published in April 1956, which includes some illustrated by Joe Kubert.

The Kubert Lounge and Gallery opened at the Cary Collection in September 2022 with an exhibition of Adam Kubert's original cover art for the first five issues of Spider-Man India.

In the fall of 2026, RIT opened the Joe Kubert & The Art of "Yossel: April 19, 1943" exhibit in RIT Wallace Library. This exhibit showcased Joe Kubert's original art pages for Yossel: April 19, 1943. As a part of this opening Adam Kubert held a comics art workshop and took part in an event discussing his father's work.

== Awards ==
- 1992 Eisner Award for Best Inker for Batman Versus Predator

== Bibliography ==
=== Interior work ===
==== Comico Comics ====
- Jezebel Jade #1–3 (1988)
- Jonny Quest #6 (1986)

==== DC Comics ====
- Action Comics #844–846, 851, Annual #11 (2006–2008)
- Adam Strange #1–3 (1990)
- Batman & the Outsiders Special #1 (2009)
- Batman Versus Predator #1–3 (1992)
- Clash #1–3 (1991–1992)
- DC Universe: Last Will and Testament #1 (2008)
- Doc Savage #1–4 (1987–1988)
- Justice League of America vol. 2, #0 (2006)
- Sgt. Rock #394, 401, 417, 422 (1984–1988)
- Star Trek #38 (1987)
- The Warlord #95, 99–100, Annual #5 (1985–1986)
- Wednesday Comics (Sgt. Rock) (writer) (2009)

==== Marvel Comics ====
- All-New, All-Different Avengers #1–3, 7–8, 13–15 (2016–2017)
- Astonishing Spider-Man & Wolverine #1–6 (2010–2011)
- The Avengers vol. 5, #4–6 (2013)
- Avengers vs. X-Men #8–10, 12 (2012)
- AvX: Vs. #1 (2012)
- Avengers & X-Men: Axis #1–2, 7 (2014)
- Captain America #7-12 (2019)
- Civil War II #8 (2016)
- Dark Reign: The List – The Amazing Spider-Man #1 (2010)
- Dark Web #1 (2022)
- Dark Web Finale #1 (2023)
- Deadpool & Wolverine: WWIII (with Joe Kelly, mini-series, 2024)
- Fear Itself: Thor #7.2 (2012)
- Ghost Rider/Blaze: Spirits of Vengeance #1–10, 12–13 (1992–1993)
- The Incredible Hulk vol. 2, #454, -1, 455–456, 458–460, 462–464, 466–467 (1997–1998)
- The Incredible Hulk vol. 3, #87 (2005)
- Mark Hazzard: Merc #9 (1987)
- Monsters Unleashed #5 (2017)
- Onslaught: Marvel Universe #1 (1996)
- Onslaught: X-Men #1 (1996)
- Origin II #1–5 (2014)
- The Spectacular Spider-Man #1–5, 297–300, 304-307 (2017–2018)
- Ultimate Fantastic Four #1–6, 13–18 (2004–2005)
- Ultimate X-Men #1–8, 10–12, 15–17, 20–22, 25, 29, 31–33 (2001–2003)
- Uncanny X-Men #339, 368–370, 372–373, 375, 378, 381, 383–384 (1996–2000)
- Weapon X #1–4 (1995)
- Wolverine vol. 2 #75, 77–79, 81–82, 85, 87–88, 90, 92–93, 95–97, 100, 102 (1993–1996)
- Wolverine vol. 3, #73–74 (2009)
- Wolverine vol. 7, #1–3, 8–10, 14–16, 20–23 (2020–2022)
- X-Men vol. 2, #81–84 (1998–1999)
- X-Men: Schism #5 (2011)
- X-Men 2099 #1–3 (1993)

=== Cover work ===
==== Marvel Comics ====
- All New Captain America #1 (2015)
- All-New Wolverine #19 (2016)
- All-New X-Men vol. 2, #1 (2012)
- Astonishing X-Men vol. 4, #14 (2017)
- Avengers vol. 7, #1 (variant cover only) (2012)
- Blink #1–3 (2001)
- Cable vol. 3, #1 (variant cover only) (2017)
- Daredevil vol. 3, #25 (variant cover only) (2014)
- Ghost Rider vol. 7, #1 (2015)
- Guardians of the Galaxy vol. 3 #8 (variant cover only) (2013)
- X-Men: hellfire club #4 (2000)
- Infinity #1-6 (2013)
- New Mutants vol. 3 #6 (2009)
- Spider-Man/Deadpool #1 (variant cover only) (2016)
- Uncanny Avengers vol. 3, #20-21 (2015)
- Uncanny X-Men #377 (2016)
- Wolverine: Weapon X #10 (2017)

Preceded by n/a	Ghost Rider/Blaze: Spirits of Vengeance artist 1992–1993	Succeeded by Mike Manley
Preceded by Mike Deodato	The Incredible Hulk artist 1997–1998	Succeeded by Javier Pulido
Preceded by Chris Bachalo	Uncanny X-Men artist 1999–2000	Succeeded by Salvador Larroca
Preceded by n/a	Ultimate X-Men artist 2001–2003	Succeeded by David Finch
Preceded by Pete Woods	Action Comics artist 2006–2007	Succeeded by Brad Walker
