= Red Prophet: The Tales of Alvin Maker =

- Cover to Red Prophet Volume 1 collection. Art by Renato Arlem

Publication information
- Publisher: Dabel Brothers (1-10); Marvel Comics (3-12)
- Schedule: Monthly
- Format: Limited series
- Genre: Fantasy
- Publication date: March 2006 – March 2008
- No. of issues: 12

Creative team
- Written by: Orson Scott Card; Roland Bernard Brown
- Penciller(s): Rodney Buchemi, Miguel Montenegro, Renato Arlem, Klebs Junior
- Inker(s): Renato Arlem, Klebs Junior, Miguel Montenegro, Klebs Moura Jr.
- Letterer(s): Simon Bowland, Bill Tortolini
- Colorist(s): David Curiel, Zona I
- Editor(s): Matt Hansen, Sean J. Jordan, Mark Paniccia, J. D. White

Collected editions
- Volume One: ISBN 978-0-7851-2583-9
- Volume Two: ISBN 9780785125846

Red Prophet: The Tales of Alvin Maker is a twelve-issue comic book limited series by Orson Scott Card, based on Card's The Tales of Alvin Maker novel series. Publication started in March 2006 by Dabel Brothers Productions and was finished in 2008 by Marvel Comics.

== The Gold Bug ==
The hard cover edition of this comic contains as an added bonus a comic adapted from Card's short story "The Gold Bug" which was published in his webzine InterGalactic Medicine Show.

== Collected editions ==
The series has been collected into a couple of trade paperbacks:

- Red Prophet: The Tales of Alvin Maker - Volume One ISBN 978-0-7851-2583-9 collecting issues #1-6, May 2007
- Red Prophet: The Tales of Alvin Maker - Volume Two ISBN 978-0-7851-2584-6 collecting issues #7-12, March 2008

== See also ==
- List of works by Orson Scott Card
- Orson Scott Card
