= Wolverine (comic book) =

Comic book series

- Cover of Wolverine #1 (September 1982); Art by Frank Miller

Publication information
- Publisher: Marvel Comics
- Schedule: Monthly
- Format: List: (vol. 1) Limited series (vols. 2–6) Ongoing series
- Publication date: List: (vol. 1) September – December 1982 (vol. 2) November 1988 – June 2003 (vol. 3) July 2003 – August 2009 (vol. 4) November 2010 – February 2013 (vol. 5) March 2013 – March 2014 (vol. 6) April – October 2014
- No. of issues: List: (vol. 1): 4 (vol. 2): 189 + 6 Annuals + #1/2 + #-1 (vol. 3): 74 + 2 Annuals + 2 Giant-Size (vol. 4): 20 + #5.1 + #300-317 (return to vol. 2 numbering) (vol. 5): 13 (vol. 6): 12 + 1 Annual (vol. 7): 50
- Main character: Wolverine

Creative team
- Written by: List: Chris Claremont, Larry Hama, Erik Larsen, Frank Tieri, Greg Rucka, Mark Millar, Marc Guggenheim, Jason Aaron, Cullen Bunn, Paul Cornell, Tom Brennan
- Penciller: List: Frank Miller, John Buscema, Marc Silvestri, Leinil Yu, Sean Chen, Darick Robertson, John Romita Jr., Javier Saltares, Humberto Ramos, Steve McNiven, Alan Davis, Ryan Stegman
- Inker: List: Joe Rubinstein, Klaus Janson, Dan Green, Edgar Tadeo, Dexter Vines, Larry Stucker, Norm Rapmund, Mark Texeira, Carlos Cuevas, Wilson Magalhaes, David Meikis, Mark Farmer, Mark Morales
- Letterer(s): Tom Orzechowski, Janice Chiang
- Colorist(s): Glynis Oliver, Paul Mounts, Matthew Wilson, David Curiel
- Editor: Louise Jones

Collected editions
- Wolverine: ISBN 978-0-7851-3724-5

Wolverine is a comic book series published by Marvel Comics starring the X-Men character Wolverine. As of April 2013, 323 issues and 11 annuals have been published. It is the original flagship title created for the character.

== Publication history ==
=== Volume 1 ===
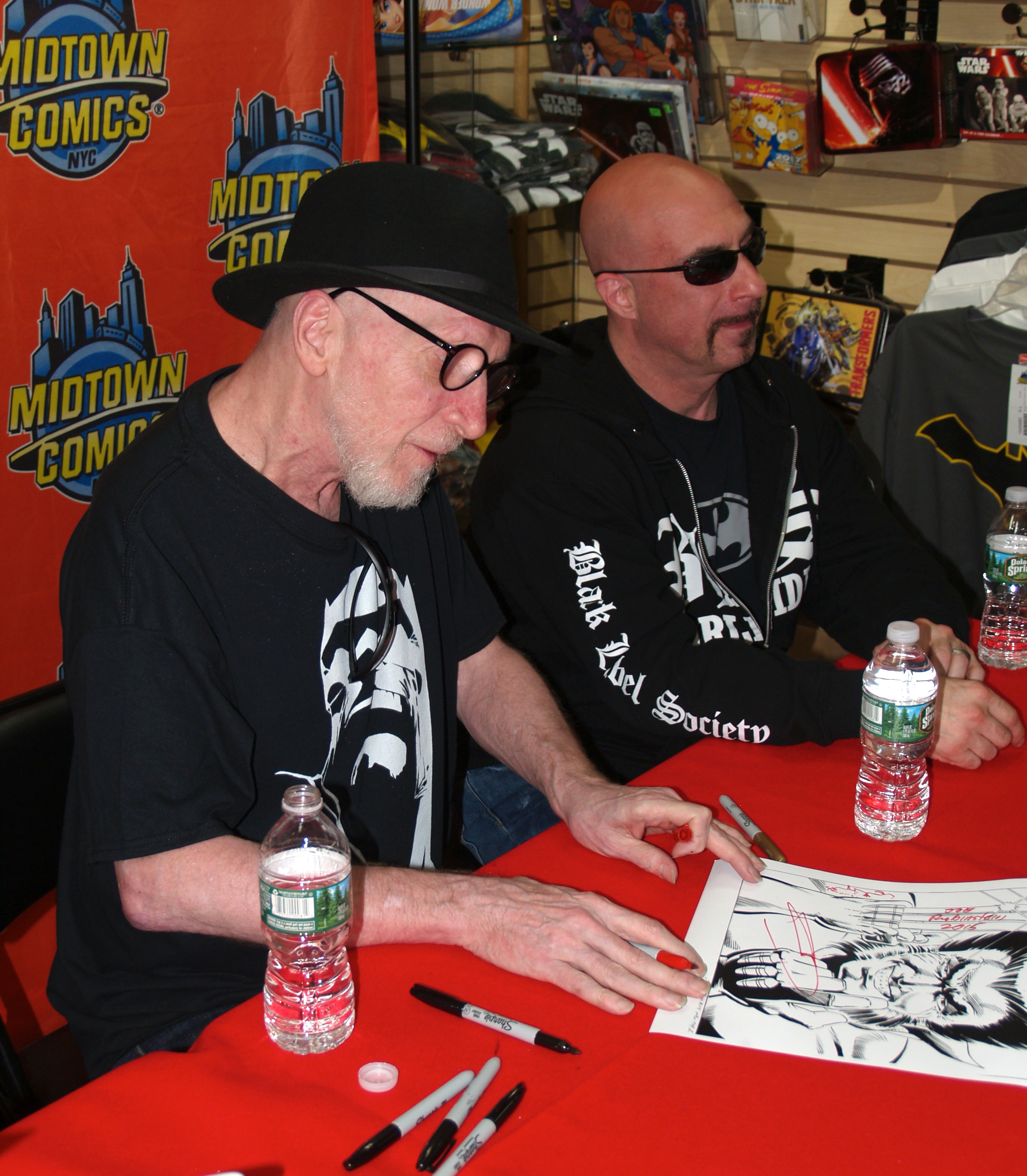
Frank Miller (left) signing a print of his artwork for the cover of Vol. 1 #1 at an appearance at Midtown Comics. Beside him is artist Greg Capullo.

The first Wolverine was a four issue limited series (the company's second-ever limited series), written by Chris Claremont with pencils by Frank Miller, inks by Joe Rubinstein, letters by Tom Orzechowski, and colors by Glynis Wein. Claremont's concept for the miniseries was to cast Wolverine as a "failed samurai", contrasting samurai self-control with the character's primal nature. Marvel Comics published the series in 1982, cover dated from September to December. Highlighting Wolverine's time in Japan, this story arc covers his battle with the yakuza, The Hand ninja organization, and his engagement to Mariko Yashida.

=== Volume 2 ===
An ongoing series started publication in 1988 and lasted until 2003 when it was relaunched after issue #189. The original creative team consisted of writer Chris Claremont and penciler John Buscema. Claremont described the series as "high adventure rather than super heroics, sort of a combination of Conan meets Terry and the Pirates." As a visual manifestation of the series' break from the traditional superhero genre, throughout Claremont's run, Wolverine wears either civilian clothes or a mask-less, all-black outfit instead of his superhero costume. Costumed characters in general were few and far between.

Nearly half of the volume's run was written by Larry Hama. Hama exerted an oversized influence on Wolverine's depiction through the 1990s, since he was generally given free rein on the series and, in his own words, "I considered the Chris Claremont, Frank Miller, and Barry Windsor-Smith [Wolverine] stories to be canon, and I pretty much ignored everything else." Other writers on the series included Peter David, Archie Goodwin, Jo Duffy, Warren Ellis, Todd Dezago, Erik Larsen, Steve Skroce, Rob Liefeld, Frank Tieri, Matt Nixon and Daniel Way. Marc Silvestri penciled Wolverine from 1990 to 1992. Hama recalled, "It was like magic. I would hand in a script and [Silvestri's] visualization of it was always better than what I saw. He would expand on the ideas. He's just a brilliant draftsman and storyteller, and I was really lucky to get to work with him."

=== Volume 3 ===
Volume 3 shares large ties to the "House of M", "Decimation", and "Civil War" story arcs, which made a large impact to the Marvel universe. "X-Men: Divided We Stand" and the alternate timeline "Old Man Logan" story arcs are also prominent in the third volume as well. Volume 3 is also notable for beginning of the Wolverine: Origins story, which introduces Wolverine's son, Daken. And as part of the "Dark Reign" storyline, the series was renamed Dark Wolverine in 2009 with issue #75 giving more focus on Daken. The third volume began in July 2003, and ended in August 2009 with issue #90. Volume 3 featured arcs written by Greg Rucka, Mark Millar, Daniel Way, Marc Guggenheim, Jeph Loeb, and Jason Aaron. Wolverine: Origins and Dark Wolverine (Vol. 3 #75-90) were also by Way.

=== Volume 4 ===
A fourth volume was launched in September 2010 with a new #1. Consisting of the "Wolverine Goes to Hell" and "Goodbye Chinatown" story arcs, the fourth volume also carries ties into the X-Men: Regenesis story arc as well.

The fourth volume ended after issue #20, and the series returned to its original ongoing numbering as issue #300. How Marvel reached issue #300 is like this: Volume 2 (#1-189), Volume 3 (#1-90/#190-279), and Volume 4 (#1-20/#280-299), with Volume 4's issue #21 ending up as #300.

The fourth volume was primarily written by Jason Aaron, and was concluded with issue #317 in December 2012 in the wake of the Marvel NOW! initiative.

=== Volume 5 ===
As part of the Marvel NOW! relaunch, Wolverine Vol. 4 was cancelled as of issue #317 and a fifth volume was launched in March 2013, with the creative team of Paul Cornell and Alan Davis. The fifth volume consists of the "Hunting Season" and "Killable" story arcs of Wolverine's life, with a brief run of 13 issues. Volume 5 serves as one of the preludes to the "Death of Wolverine" story arc.

An additional series titled Savage Wolverine debuted in January 2013. The title features team-ups between Wolverine and Shanna the She-Devil, as they try to survive The Savage Land, and various encounters with other Marvel characters.

=== Volume 6 ===
A sixth volume of Wolverine by Paul Cornell and Ryan Stegman was launched as part of All-New Marvel NOW! initiative in February 2014, featuring a changed Wolverine, who has joined a group of minor supervillains as an attempt to simplify his life. Consisting of the "12 Months to Die" story arc, the sixth volume ran for thirteen issues, and also served as the second prelude to the "Death of Wolverine" story arc.

=== Volume 7 ===
The seventh volume of Wolverine was released as part of the Dawn of X, Reign of X, and Destiny of X relaunches. The first two relaunches took place in the year of 2020, being overseen by Jonathan Hickman. The volume is written by Benjamin Percy and illustrated by Adam Kubert. The sixth and seventh issues are the tie-ins to the "X of Swords" crossover storyline of Dawn of X, while issues #8–19 are connected to the "Hellfire Gala" crossover storyline in the Reign of X relaunch. Issue #20 ties into the "X Lives of Wolverine and X Deaths of Wolverine" story event, along with the Destiny of X relaunch that will follows the event. Issues #24-25 tie into the "Judgement Day" crossover event. Issues #41-50 consist of the "Sabretooth War" story arc, and a connection to the Fall of X relaunch. The overall seventh volume concludes with issue #50.

==== Prints ====
Issue	Publication date	Writer	Artist(s)	Colorist(s)	Comic Book Roundup rating	Estimated sales to North American retailers (first month)	Notes
#1	February 19, 2020	Benjamin Percy	Adam Kubert and Viktor Bogdanovic	Frank Martin and Matthew Wilson	8.3 by 23 professional critics	190,568	None
#2	March 25, 2020	Benjamin Percy	Adam Kubert	Frank Martin	7.9 by 15 professional critics	74,228	None
#3	July 22, 2020	Benjamin Percy	Adam Kubert	Frank Martin	8.1 by 9 professional critics	Data not yet available	None
#4	August 19, 2020	Benjamin Percy	Viktor Bogdanovic	Matthew Wilson	8.2 by 10 professional critics	Data not yet available	None
#5	September 2, 2020	Benjamin Percy	Viktor Bogdanovic	Matthew Wilson	7.4 by 6 professional critics	Data not yet available	None
#6	October 7, 2020	Benjamin Percy	Viktor Bogdanovic	Matthew Wilson	7.8 by 11 professional critics	Data not yet available	X of Swords tie-in
#7	November 11, 2020	Benjamin Percy; Gerry Duggan	Joshua Cassara	Guru e-FX	7.9 by 10 professional critics	Data not yet available	X of Swords tie-in
#8	December 30, 2020	Benjamin Percy	Viktor Bogdanovic; Adam Kubert	Antonio Fabela; Matt Wilson	8.1 by 10 professional critics	Data not yet available	None

=== Volume 8 ===
Volume 8 of the definitive Wolverine title began in mid-to-late months of 2024, as part of the X-Men: From the Ashes relaunch. Following the tragic end of the Krakoan Era, Wolverine returns to a solitary life among wolves in the snowy Canadian Wilderness. However, the solitude is short-lived when he finds himself being hunted by old foes again.

== Contributors ==
=== Vol. 1 (1982) ===
==== Writers ====
Years	Writer	Issues
1982	Chris Claremont	#1–4

==== Pencilers ====
Years	Penciler	Issues
1982	Frank Miller	#1–4

=== Vol. 2 (1988–2003) ===
==== Writers ====
Years	Writer	Issues
1988-1989, 1998	Chris Claremont	#1–8, #10, #125-128
1989, 1990, 1991	Peter David	#9, #11-16, #24, #44
1989-1990	Archie Goodwin	#17-23
1990	Jo Duffy	#25-30
1990-1997	Larry Hama	#31–43, #45–53, #55-57, #60–109, #111–118, Annual ‘95; #-1
1992, 1998, 2000	Fabian Nicieza	#54, #132, #146
1992	D. G. Chichester	#58-59
1996	Dan Slott	#102.5
1997	Ben Raab	#1/2
1997, 1998	Tom DeFalco	#110, #123-124
1997-1998	Warren Ellis	#119-122
1998	Todd Dezago	#129-131
1998	Brian K. Vaughan	#131
1999	Marc Andreyko	Annual ’99
1999-2000	Erik Larsen	#133-149
1999, 2000	Eric Stephenson	#142-144, #154-157
2000	Steve Skroce	#150-153
2000	Rob Liefeld	#154-157
2001	Joe Pruett	#158
2000-2003	Frank Tieri	#159-176, #181-186, Annual 2000, Annual 2001
2002	Matt Nixon	#177-180, #183 (second story)
2003	Daniel Way	#187-189

==== Pencilers ====
Years	Penciler	Issues
1988-1989, 1990	John Buscema	#1–8, 10-16, #25, #27
1989, 1990	Gene Colan	#9, #24
1989-1990	John Byrne	#17-23
1990	Klaus Janson	#26
1990	Barry Kitson	#28-29
1990	Bill Jaaska	#30
1990-1992	Marc Silvestri	#31-46, 48–50, 52-53, 55–57
1991	Larry Stroman	#44
1991	Gerald DeCaire	#47
1992	Andy Kubert	#51
1992	Darick Robertson	#54, #58-59
1992	Dave Hoover	#60
1992-1993, 2001	Mark Texeira	#61-63, #65-68, #163
1992	Mark Pacella	#64
1993	Steve Biasi	#68
1993	Dwayne Turner	#69-73
1993	Jim Fern	#74
1993-1996	Adam Kubert	#75, #77–79, #81–82, #85, #87–88, #90, #92–93, #95–97, #100, #102
1993	Tomm Coker	#76
1994, 2000	Ian Churchill	#80, #156-157
1994	Bob McLeod	#82
1994	John Nadeau	#83
1994	Ron Wagner	#84
1994	Yancy Labat	#84
1994	Ron Garney	#86
1994-1995	Fabio Laguna	#88-89
1995	Duncan Rouleau	#91
1995	Chris Alexander	#94
1995	Luciano Lima	#96
1996	Ramon Bernado	#98
1996	Val Semeiks	#99, #101, #103-106
1996	Mark Buckingham	#102.5
1996-1997	Anthony Winn	#107-109, #111-112
1997	Joe Bennett	#110
1997-1999	Leinil Francis Yu	#113-122, #125-127, #129-130, #132, #139-143, #145
1997	Joe Phillips	#1/2
1998	Denys Cowan	#123-124
1998	Carlos Pacheco	#127
1998	Mel Rubi	#127
1997, 1998	Cary Nord	#127, #131; #-1
1998, 1999	Jeff Matsuda	#127, #133-138
1998, 1999-2000	Mike Miller	#127, #144, #146
1998	Stephen Platt	#128
1998	Angel Unzueta	#128
1999	Walter A. McDaniel	Annual ’99
2000	Roger Cruz	#147-148
2000	Graham Nolan	#149
2000	Steve Skroce	#150-153
2000	Rob Liefeld	#154-155
2001	Sunny Lee	#158
2001-2003	Sean Chen	#159-162, #164-166, #170-176, #181-185
2001	Barry Windsor-Smith	#166
2001, 2002	Dan Fraga	#167-169, #177-178
2001	Jorge Santamaria	Annual 2000
2002	Matthew Marsilia	Annual 2001
2002	Ethan Van Sciver	#179
2002	Jorge Lucas	#180
2003	Ryan Bodenheim	#183 (second story)
2003	Terry Dodson	#186
2003	John McCrea	#187
2003	Staz Johnson	#188-189

=== Vol. 3 (2003–2009) ===
==== Writers ====
Years	Writer	Issues
2003-2004	Greg Rucka	#1-19
2004-2005, 2008-2009	Mark Millar	#20-32, #66-72
2005-2006, 2009	Daniel Way	#33-40, #73-74
2006	Stuart Moore	#41
2006-2008	Marc Guggenheim	#42-48, #57-61
2007	Rob Williams	#49
2007	Jeph Loeb	#50-55
2007-2008, 2009	Jason Aaron	#56, #62-65, #73-74

==== Pencilers ====
Years	Penciler	Issues
2003-2004	Darick Robertson	#1-6, #12-19
2004	Leandro Fernandez	#7-11
2004-2005	John Romita Jr.	#20-31
2005	Kaare Andrews	#32
2005-2006	Javier Saltares	#33-40
2006	C.P. Smith	#41
2006-2007	Humberto Ramos	#42-48
2007	Laurence Campbell	#49
2007	Simone Bianchi	#50-55
2007	Ed McGuinness	#50 (second story)
2007-2008	Howard Chaykin	#56-61
2008	Ron Garney	#62-65
2008-2009	Steve McNiven	#66-72
2009	Adam Kubert	#73-74
2009	Tommy Lee Edwards	#73-74

=== Dark Wolverine (2009–2010) ===
==== Writers ====
Years	Writer	Issues
2009-2010	Daniel Way	#75-90
2009-2010	Marjorie Liu	#75-90

==== Pencilers ====
Years	Penciler	Issues
2009-2010	Giuseppe Camuncoli	#75-77, #81-84
2009-2010	Stephen Segovia	#78-80, #85-86, #88-89
2010	Paco Diaz	#80, #88-89
2010	Mirco Pierfederici	#87, #90

== In other media ==
=== Television ===
- The story arc from Volume 1 has been adapted into the plot of the Japanese series Wolverine, a part of the Marvel Anime anthology miniseries.
- Some of the details regarding the story arc detailing Logan’s Japanese adventure in Volume 1 have been adapted into an episode of Wolverine and the X-Men.

=== Film ===
- The story arc from Volume 1 concerning Logan's exploits in Japan has been loosely adapted into the 2013 live-action film, The Wolverine, directed by James Mangold and starring Hugh Jackman as Logan, with Tao Okamoto, Hiroyuki Sanada and Rila Fukushima, being the sixth installment to the X-Men film series.
- The out-of-continuity "Old Man Logan" storyline from the solo title's third volume served as the primary inspiration for the live-action film Logan (2017), again directed by Mangold and starring Jackman in the title role. However, the film's adaptation of the narrative is loose, removing plot elements such as the conquering of the world by various supervillains and repurposing an ailing Charles Xavier in the support role originally occupied by Clint Barton/Hawkeye in the source material.

== Reception ==
IGN gave the trade paperback collection of the first Wolverine series a "Must Have" rating.

== Collected editions ==
=== Marvel Essentials ===
Marvel Essential editions reprint material in black and white.

Title	Vol.	Material collected	Publication date	ISBN
Essential Wolverine	1	Wolverine (vol. 2) #1–23	February 2009	978-0-7851-3566-1
Essential Wolverine	2	Wolverine (vol. 2) #24–47	March 2002	978-0-7851-0550-3
Essential Wolverine	3	Wolverine (vol. 2) #48–69	March 2002	978-0-7851-0595-4
Essential Wolverine	4	Wolverine (vol. 2) #70–90	May 2006	978-0-7851-2059-9
Essential Wolverine	5	Wolverine (vol. 2) #91–110, Annual '96; Uncanny X-Men #332	December 2008	978-0-7851-3077-2
Essential Wolverine	6	Wolverine (vol. 2) #111–128, −1, Annual '97	November 2012	978-0-7851-6352-7
Essential Wolverine	7	Wolverine (vol. 2) #129–148; Hulk (vol. 1) #8	May 2013	978-0-7851-8408-9

=== Epic Collection ===
Title	Vol.	Vol. title	Material collected	Publication date	ISBN
Wolverine Epic Collection	1	Madripoor Nights	Wolverine (vol. 2) #1–16; material from Marvel Comics Presents #1–10; Marvel Age Annual #4	December 2014	978-0-7851-8903-9
Wolverine Epic Collection	2	Back to Basics	Wolverine (vol. 2) #17–30; Wolverine/Nick Fury: The Scorpio Connection; Wolverine: The Jungle Adventure	March 2019	978-1-302-91609-1
Wolverine Epic Collection	3	Blood and Claws	Wolverine (vol. 2) #31–44 (1988), Wolverine: Bloodlust (1990) 1, Wolverine: Bloody Choices (1991) 1	July 2021	978-1-302-93089-9
Wolverine Epic Collection	6	Inner Fury	Wolverine (vol. 2) #69–75; Wolverine: Inner Fury; Wolverine: Killing; Wolverine: Global Jeopardy; Sabretooth (vol. 1) #1–4; X-Men (vol. 2) #25	March 2020	978-1-302-92390-7
Wolverine Epic Collection	7	To the Bone	Wolverine (vol. 2) #76-86; Wolverine: Evilution; Wolverine & Nick Fury: Scorpio Rising; Ghost Rider, Wolverine, Punisher: The Dark Design; Cable #16	June 2023	
Wolverine Epic Collection	8	The Dying Game	Wolverine (vol. 2) #87–100; Wolverine Annual '95; Wolverine: Knight of Terra	December 2015	978-0-7851-9261-9
Wolverine Epic Collection	9	Tooth and Claw	Wolverine (1988) #101-109, 102.5;Wolverine Annual '96; Uncanny X-Men (1981) #332; Venom: Tooth and Claw (1996) #1-3; Logan: Path of the Warlord (1996) #1; Logan: Shadow Society (1996) #1	June 14, 2022	
Wolverine Epic Collection	12	Shadow of Apocalypse	Wolverine (vol. 2) #133–149; Hulk (vol. 1) #8; Wolverine/Cable: Guts'n'Glory	February 2017	978-1-302-90385-5
Wolverine Epic Collection	13	Blood Debt	Wolverine (vol. 2) #150–158; Wolverine Annual '99; Wolverine: The Origin #1–6	March 2018	978-1-302-91022-8
Wolverine Epic Collection	14	The Return of Weapon X	Wolverine (vol. 2) #159-172, Wolverine Annual 2000-2001	March 26, 2024	978-1-302-95811-4
Wolverine Epic Collection	15	Law of the Jungle	Wolverine (vol. 2) #173-189	March 25, 2025	978-1-302-96413-9

=== Wolverine Omnibus ===
#	Title	Years covered	Material collected	Pages	Released	ISBN
1	Wolverine Vol. 1	1974-1989, 1991	Marvel Comics Presents #1–10, 72–84; Incredible Hulk #180–182, 340; Marvel Treasury Edition #26; Best of Marvel Comics; Wolverine (1982) #1–4; Uncanny X-Men #172–173; Kitty Pryde and Wolverine #1–6; Captain America Annual #8; Spider-Man vs. Wolverine #1; Marvel Age Annual #4; Wolverine (1988) #1–10; The Punisher War Journal #6–7	1,064	1 Apr 2009	Frank Miller cover: 978-0-7851-3477-0
1	Wolverine Vol. 1	1974-1989, 1991	Marvel Comics Presents #1–10, 72–84; Incredible Hulk #180–182, 340; Marvel Treasury Edition #26; Best of Marvel Comics; Wolverine (1982) #1–4; Uncanny X-Men #172–173; Kitty Pryde and Wolverine #1–6; Captain America Annual #8; Spider-Man vs. Wolverine #1; Marvel Age Annual #4; Wolverine (1988) #1–10; The Punisher War Journal #6–7	1,064	1 Apr 2009	Steve McNiven DM cover: 978-0-7851-3665-1
1	Wolverine Vol. 1	1974-1989, 1991	Marvel Comics Presents #1–10, 72–84; Incredible Hulk #180–182, 340; Marvel Treasury Edition #26; Best of Marvel Comics; Wolverine (1982) #1–4; Uncanny X-Men #172–173; Kitty Pryde and Wolverine #1–6; Captain America Annual #8; Spider-Man vs. Wolverine #1; Marvel Age Annual #4; Wolverine (1988) #1–10; The Punisher War Journal #6–7	1,064	7 Apr 2020	Frank Miller cover: 978-1-302-92267-2
1	Wolverine Vol. 1	1974-1989, 1991	Marvel Comics Presents #1–10, 72–84; Incredible Hulk #180–182, 340; Marvel Treasury Edition #26; Best of Marvel Comics; Wolverine (1982) #1–4; Uncanny X-Men #172–173; Kitty Pryde and Wolverine #1–6; Captain America Annual #8; Spider-Man vs. Wolverine #1; Marvel Age Annual #4; Wolverine (1988) #1–10; The Punisher War Journal #6–7	1,064	7 Apr 2020	Steve McNiven DM cover: 978-1-302-92383-9
2	Wolverine Vol. 2	1989-1990	Wolverine (1988) #11–30; Havok & Wolverine: Meltdown #1–4; Wolverine/Nick Fury: The Scorpio Connection; Wolverine: The Jungle Adventure; Wolverine: Bloodlust; material from Marvel Comics Presents #38–71	1,248	4 Aug 2021	Jim Lee cover: 978-1-302-92995-4
2	Wolverine Vol. 2	1989-1990	Wolverine (1988) #11–30; Havok & Wolverine: Meltdown #1–4; Wolverine/Nick Fury: The Scorpio Connection; Wolverine: The Jungle Adventure; Wolverine: Bloodlust; material from Marvel Comics Presents #38–71	1,248	4 Aug 2021	Barry Windsor-Smith DM cover: 978-1-302-93052-3
2	Wolverine Vol. 2	1989-1990	Wolverine (1988) #11–30; Havok & Wolverine: Meltdown #1–4; Wolverine/Nick Fury: The Scorpio Connection; Wolverine: The Jungle Adventure; Wolverine: Bloodlust; material from Marvel Comics Presents #38–71	1,248	4 Aug 2021	John Byrne DM cover: 978-1-302-92996-1
2	Wolverine Vol. 2	1989-1990	Wolverine (1988) #11–30; Havok & Wolverine: Meltdown #1–4; Wolverine/Nick Fury: The Scorpio Connection; Wolverine: The Jungle Adventure; Wolverine: Bloodlust; material from Marvel Comics Presents #38–71	1,248	8 Nov 2022	Jim Lee cover: 978-1-302-94513-8
2	Wolverine Vol. 2	1989-1990	Wolverine (1988) #11–30; Havok & Wolverine: Meltdown #1–4; Wolverine/Nick Fury: The Scorpio Connection; Wolverine: The Jungle Adventure; Wolverine: Bloodlust; material from Marvel Comics Presents #38–71	1,248	8 Nov 2022	Barry Windsor-Smith DM cover: 978-1-302-94514-5
2	Wolverine Vol. 2	1989-1990	Wolverine (1988) #11–30; Havok & Wolverine: Meltdown #1–4; Wolverine/Nick Fury: The Scorpio Connection; Wolverine: The Jungle Adventure; Wolverine: Bloodlust; material from Marvel Comics Presents #38–71	1,248	8 Nov 2022	John Byrne DM cover: 978-1-302-94512-1
3	Wolverine Vol. 3	1990-1992	Wolverine (1988) #31-59; Wolverine: Bloody Choices; Wolverine: Rahne of Terra; Ghost Rider/Wolverine/Punisher: Hearts of Darkness; X-Men (1991) #4–7; material from Marvel Fanfare #54–55 and Marvel Comics Presents #85–108	1,264	17 Jan 2023	Marc Silvestri cover: 978-1-302-94651-7
3	Wolverine Vol. 3	1990-1992	Wolverine (1988) #31-59; Wolverine: Bloody Choices; Wolverine: Rahne of Terra; Ghost Rider/Wolverine/Punisher: Hearts of Darkness; X-Men (1991) #4–7; material from Marvel Fanfare #54–55 and Marvel Comics Presents #85–108	1,264	17 Jan 2023	Jim Lee DM cover: 978-1-302-94652-4
3	Wolverine Vol. 3	1990-1992	Wolverine (1988) #31-59; Wolverine: Bloody Choices; Wolverine: Rahne of Terra; Ghost Rider/Wolverine/Punisher: Hearts of Darkness; X-Men (1991) #4–7; material from Marvel Fanfare #54–55 and Marvel Comics Presents #85–108	1,264	17 Jan 2023	Michael Avon Oeming DM cover: 978-1-302-94839-9
4	Wolverine Vol. 4	1992-1993	Wolverine (1988) #60–75; Wolverine: Inner Fury; Wolverine: Killing; Wolverine: Global Jeopardy; Wolverine and the Punisher: Damaging Evidence #1–3; Sabretooth #1–4; Spider-Man/Punisher/Sabretooth: Designer Genes; X-Men (1991) #25; material from Marvel Comics Presents #109–142 and Marvel Holiday Special #2	1,176	12 Sep 2023	Adam Kubert cover: 978-1-302-95399-7
4	Wolverine Vol. 4	1992-1993	Wolverine (1988) #60–75; Wolverine: Inner Fury; Wolverine: Killing; Wolverine: Global Jeopardy; Wolverine and the Punisher: Damaging Evidence #1–3; Sabretooth #1–4; Spider-Man/Punisher/Sabretooth: Designer Genes; X-Men (1991) #25; material from Marvel Comics Presents #109–142 and Marvel Holiday Special #2	1,176	12 Sep 2023	Andy Kubert Magneto DM cover: 978-1-302-95400-0
4	Wolverine Vol. 4	1992-1993	Wolverine (1988) #60–75; Wolverine: Inner Fury; Wolverine: Killing; Wolverine: Global Jeopardy; Wolverine and the Punisher: Damaging Evidence #1–3; Sabretooth #1–4; Spider-Man/Punisher/Sabretooth: Designer Genes; X-Men (1991) #25; material from Marvel Comics Presents #109–142 and Marvel Holiday Special #2	1,176	12 Sep 2023	Mark Texeira Sabretooth DM cover: 978-1-302-95401-7
5	Wolverine Vol. 5	1993-1996	Wolverine (1988) #76-101; Wolverine Annual '95; Marvel Comics Presents #150-151, 152-155 (A stories); Cable #16; Wolverine: Evilution #1; Wolverine & Nick Fury: Scorpio Rising #1 Ghost Rider/Wolverine/Punisher: The Dark Design #1; Wolverine: Knight of Terra #1; Wolverine/Gambit: Victims #1-4; Uncanny X-Men #332; Logan: Path of the Warlord #1	1,296	14 May 2024	Adam Kubert cover: 978-1-302-95806-0
5	Wolverine Vol. 5	1993-1996	Wolverine (1988) #76-101; Wolverine Annual '95; Marvel Comics Presents #150-151, 152-155 (A stories); Cable #16; Wolverine: Evilution #1; Wolverine & Nick Fury: Scorpio Rising #1 Ghost Rider/Wolverine/Punisher: The Dark Design #1; Wolverine: Knight of Terra #1; Wolverine/Gambit: Victims #1-4; Uncanny X-Men #332; Logan: Path of the Warlord #1	1,296	14 May 2024	Ian Churchill Cyber DM cover: 978-1-302-95807-7
5	Wolverine Vol. 5	1993-1996	Wolverine (1988) #76-101; Wolverine Annual '95; Marvel Comics Presents #150-151, 152-155 (A stories); Cable #16; Wolverine: Evilution #1; Wolverine & Nick Fury: Scorpio Rising #1 Ghost Rider/Wolverine/Punisher: The Dark Design #1; Wolverine: Knight of Terra #1; Wolverine/Gambit: Victims #1-4; Uncanny X-Men #332; Logan: Path of the Warlord #1	1,296	14 May 2024	Tim Sale Gambit DM cover: 978-1-302-95810-7
6	Wolverine Vol. 6	1996-1997, 2000	Wolverine (1988) #102-118, -1, 1/2, 102.5; Wolverine Annual '96-97; Logan: Shadow Society (1996) #1; Venom: Tooth and Claw (1996) #1-3; Maverick (1997a) #1; Wolverine: Doombringer (1997) #1; Kitty Pryde: Agent of S.H.I.E.L.D. (1997) #1-3; Before the Fantastic Four: Ben Grimm and Logan (2000) #1-3; Wolverine: Days of Future Past (1997) #1-3; Wolverine Encyclopedia (1996) #1-2; material from Marvel: Shadows and Light (1997) #1	1,152	27 May 2025	Leinil Francis Yu cover: 978-1-302-96431-3
6	Wolverine Vol. 6	1996-1997, 2000	Wolverine (1988) #102-118, -1, 1/2, 102.5; Wolverine Annual '96-97; Logan: Shadow Society (1996) #1; Venom: Tooth and Claw (1996) #1-3; Maverick (1997a) #1; Wolverine: Doombringer (1997) #1; Kitty Pryde: Agent of S.H.I.E.L.D. (1997) #1-3; Before the Fantastic Four: Ben Grimm and Logan (2000) #1-3; Wolverine: Days of Future Past (1997) #1-3; Wolverine Encyclopedia (1996) #1-2; material from Marvel: Shadows and Light (1997) #1	1,152	27 May 2025	David Winn DM cover: 978-1-302-96432-0
	Weapon X: The Return	2001-2004, 2014	Wolverine (1988) #162–166, 173–174, 176; Deadpool (1997) #57–60; Weapon X (2002) #1–28, 1/2; Weapon X: The Draft - Sauron, Wild Child, Kane, Marrow and Agent Zero; Weapon X: Days of Future Now #1–5; material from Wolverine (1988) #175 and Deadpool (2012) #27	1,280	15 May 2018	Bart Sears cover: 978-1-302-91182-9
	Wolverine by Mark Millar	2004-2009	Wolverine (2003) #20–32, 66–72; Wolverine: Giant-Size Old Man Logan	576	2 Jul 2013	Joe Quesada cover: 978-0-7851-6796-9
1	Wolverine by Jason Aaron Vol. 1	2007-2010, 2002	Wolverine (2003) #56, 62–65; Wolverine: Manifest Destiny #1–4; Wolverine: Weapon X #1–16; Dark Reign: The List – Wolverine; material from Wolverine (2003) #73–74, Dark X-Men: The Beginning #3 and Wolverine (1988) #175	688	1 Jul 2011	David Finch cover: 978-0-7851-5639-0
1	Wolverine by Jason Aaron Vol. 1	2007-2010, 2002	Wolverine (2003) #56, 62–65; Wolverine: Manifest Destiny #1–4; Wolverine: Weapon X #1–16; Dark Reign: The List – Wolverine; material from Wolverine (2003) #73–74, Dark X-Men: The Beginning #3 and Wolverine (1988) #175	688	15 Apr 2025	David Finch cover: 978-1-302-96136-7
1	Wolverine by Jason Aaron Vol. 1	2007-2010, 2002	Wolverine (2003) #56, 62–65; Wolverine: Manifest Destiny #1–4; Wolverine: Weapon X #1–16; Dark Reign: The List – Wolverine; material from Wolverine (2003) #73–74, Dark X-Men: The Beginning #3 and Wolverine (1988) #175	688	15 Apr 2025	Adam Kubert Motorbike DM cover: 978-1-302-96137-4
	Wolverine and the X-Men by Jason Aaron	2011-2014	Wolverine and the X-Men #1–35, 38–42, Annual #1	928	17 Jun 2014	978-0-7851-9024-0
	Wolverine and the X-Men by Jason Aaron	2011-2014	Wolverine and the X-Men #1–35, 38–42, Annual #1	928	2 Feb 2022	Chris Bachalo cover: 978-1-302-93245-9
	Wolverine and the X-Men by Jason Aaron	2011-2014	Wolverine and the X-Men #1–35, 38–42, Annual #1	928	2 Feb 2022	Stuart Immonen DM cover: 978-1-302-93245-9
	Wolverine Goes To Hell	2010-2012	Astonishing Spider-Man and Wolverine #1–6; Wolverine (2010) #1–20, 5.1, 300–304; X-Men: Schism #1–5; material from Wolverine: Road to Hell	984	15 May 2018	Jae Lee cover: 978-1-302-91159-1
	Wolverine Goes To Hell	2010-2012	Astonishing Spider-Man and Wolverine #1–6; Wolverine (2010) #1–20, 5.1, 300–304; X-Men: Schism #1–5; material from Wolverine: Road to Hell	984	22 Jul 2025	Jae Lee cover: 978-1-302-96138-1
	Wolverine Goes To Hell	2010-2012	Astonishing Spider-Man and Wolverine #1–6; Wolverine (2010) #1–20, 5.1, 300–304; X-Men: Schism #1–5; material from Wolverine: Road to Hell	984	22 Jul 2025	DM cover: TBC
	Death of Wolverine	2013-2014	Wolverine (2013) #1-13, Wolverine (2014) #1-12, Annual #1, Marvel 75th Anniversary Celebration #1 (Wolverine story), Death of Wolverine #1-4, Death of Wolverine: The Weapon X Program #1-5, Death of Wolverine: The Logan Legacy #1-7, Death of Wolverine: Deadpool & Captain America #1, Death of Wolverine: Life After Logan #1, Nightcrawler (2014) #7, Wolverine & The X-Men (2014) #10-11, Storm (2014) #4-5	1,232	26 Nov 2024	Alex Ross cover: 978-1-302-95987-6
	Death of Wolverine	2013-2014	Wolverine (2013) #1-13, Wolverine (2014) #1-12, Annual #1, Marvel 75th Anniversary Celebration #1 (Wolverine story), Death of Wolverine #1-4, Death of Wolverine: The Weapon X Program #1-5, Death of Wolverine: The Logan Legacy #1-7, Death of Wolverine: Deadpool & Captain America #1, Death of Wolverine: Life After Logan #1, Nightcrawler (2014) #7, Wolverine & The X-Men (2014) #10-11, Storm (2014) #4-5	1,232	26 Nov 2024	Joe Quesada DM cover: 978-1-302-95988-3
	Wolverine: Sabretooth War	2022-2024	Sabretooth (2022) #1-5, Sabretooth & the Exiles (2022) #1-5, Wolverine (2020) #41-50	592	3 Jun 2025	Leinil Francis Yu cover: 978-1-302-96140-4
	Wolverine: Sabretooth War	2022-2024	Sabretooth (2022) #1-5, Sabretooth & the Exiles (2022) #1-5, Wolverine (2020) #41-50	592	3 Jun 2025	Greg Capullo DM cover: 978-1-302-96141-1

=== Oversized hardcovers ===
Title	Vol.	Material collected	Publication date	ISBN
The Best of Wolverine	1	Wolverine (vol. 1) #1–4; Marvel Comics Presents #72–84; The Incredible Hulk #181; Uncanny X-Men #205; Captain America Annual #8	October 2004	978-0-7851-1370-6
House of M: Wolverine, Iron Man & Hulk		Wolverine vol.3 #33-35, Iron Man: House of M #1-3, Incredible Hulk #83-87, Captain America #10, Pulse #10, and Cable & Deadpool #17	February 2010	978-0-7851-3882-2
Acts of Vengeance Crossovers Omnibus		Wolverine vol.2 (1988) #19-20; Fantastic Four #334-336; Doctor Strange, Sorcerer Supreme #11-13; Incredible Hulk #363; Punisher (1987) #28-29; Punisher War Journal (1988) #12-13; Marc Spector: Moon Knight #8-10; Daredevil #275-276; Power Pack (1984) #53; Alpha Flight (1983) #79-80; New Mutants (1983) #84-86; Uncanny X-Men #256-258; X-Factor (1986) #49-50; Damage Control (1989, volume 2) #1-4; Web of Spider-Man (1985) #64-65	July 2011	0-7851-4488-9
X-Men: Fatal Attractions		Wolverine #75; Uncanny X-Men #298–305 and 315, Annual #17; X-Factor #87–92; X-Men Unlimited #1–2; X-Force #25; X-Men #25; Excalibur #71	April 2012	978-0-7851-6245-2
Wolverine: The Adamantium Collection		Origin #1-6; material from Marvel Comics presents (1988) #72-84; Uncanny X-Men (1963) #162, 205, 268; Wolverine (vol. 1) #1-4; Wolverine (vol. 2) #75, 119-122; Wolverine (1988) (vol. 2) #75, 119–122, Wolverine (2003) #32; Wolverine & The X-Men 1-3	June 2013	978-0-7851-6789-1
X-Men: Battle of the Atom		Wolverine and the X-Men vol.1 #36-37; X-Men: Battle of the Atom (vol. 1) #1-2; All-New X-Men #16-17; X-Men (vol. 4) #5-6; Uncanny X-Men (vol. 3) #12-13	January 2014	978-0-7851-8906-0
Wolverine: Japan's Most Wanted		Wolverine: Japan's Most Wanted #1-13	June 2014	
X-Men: Phalanx Covenant		Wolverine #85; Uncanny X-Men #306, #311–314 and #316–317; Excalibur #78–82; X-Men #36–37; X-Factor #106; X-Force #38; Cable #16	February 2014	978-0-7851-8549-9
X-Men / Avengers: Onslaught Omnibus		Wolverine #104-105; Cable #32-36; Uncanny X-Men #333-337; X-Force #55, #57-58; X-Man #15-19; X-Men #53-57, Annual '96; X-Men Unlimited #11; Onslaught: X-Men, Marvel Universe, Epilogue; Avengers #401-402; Fantastic Four #415; Incredible Hulk #444-445; X-Factor #125-126; Amazing Spider-Man #415; Green Goblin #12; Spider-Man #72; Iron Man #332; Punisher #11; Thor #502; X-Men: Road to Onslaught #1; material from Excalibur #100, Fantastic Four #416	July 2015	0-7851-9262-X
Marvel Universe by John Byrne Omnibus	1	Wolverine (1988) #17–23; Champions #11–15; Marvel Preview #11; Avengers (1963) #164–166, 181–191; Power Man #48-50; Marvel Premiere #47-48; Captain America (1968) #247-255; Silver Surfer (1982) #1; Incredible Hulk (1968) #314-319; Marvel Fanfare (1982) #29	April 2016	978-0-7851-9560-3
Deadpool: Beginnings Omnibus		Wolverine vol.2 #88, #154-155; New Mutants #98; X-Force #2, #11, #15, #47, #56; Nomad #4; Deadpool: The Circle Chase #1-4; Secret Defenders #15-17; Deadpool #1-4; Heroes For Hire #10-11; Deadpool Team-Up #1; material from Avengers #366; Silver Sable and the Wild Pack #23; Wolverine Annual '95, '99; Deadpool cameo pages	January 2017	978-1-302-90429-6
Wolverine: Origin – The Complete Collection		Origin #1–6; Origin II #1–5	January 2017	978-1-302-90471-5
Deadpool by Daniel Way Omnibus	1	Wolverine: Origins #21-25; Deadpool (2008) #1-26; Thunderbolts (1997) #130-131; Hit-Monkey (2010A) #1, (2010B) #1-3; Deadpool Saga	February 2018	978-1-302-91006-8
Hunt for Wolverine		Hunt For Wolverine #1, Hunt For Wolverine: Weapon Lost #1-4, Hunt For Wolverine: Adamantium Agenda #1-4, Hunt For Wolverine: Claws Of A Killer #1-4, Hunt For Wolverine: Mystery In Madripoor #1-4, Where's Wolverine pages	November 2018	978-1-302-91301-4
Marvel Universe by Rob Liefeld Omnibus		Wolverine vol.2 (1988) #154-157; X-Factor (1986) 40, Uncanny X-Men (1981) 245, What If? (1989) 7, Captain America (1996) 1–6, Avengers (1996) 1–7, Onslaught Reborn 1–5; Material From Amazing Spider-Man Annual 23; Marvel Comics Presents (1988) 51–53, 85–86, 99, Heroes Reborn 1/2	October 2019	978-1-302-92002-9
X-Men vs Apocalypse: The Twelve Omnibus		Wolverine vol.2 (1988) #145-149; Uncanny X-Men (1981) #371-380, Annual'99; X-Men (1991) #91-93, #94 (A STORY), #95-99, Annual'99; X-Men Unlimited (1993) #24(A STORY), #25-26; Gambit (1999) #8-9; Astonishing X-Men (1999) #1-3; Cable (1993) #71-78; X-Man (1995) #59-60; X-51 (1999) #8; X-Force (1991) #101; X-Men 1999 Yearbook	February 2020	978-1-302-92287-0

=== Thick Trade Paperbacks (Complete / Ultimate Collections) ===
Title	Vol.	Vol. title	Material collected	Publication date	ISBN
Wolverine: Prehistory			Marvel Comics Presents #93–98; Wolverine (vol. 3) #32; Logan: Path of the Warlord, Shadow Society; Wolverine: Agent of Atlas #1–3; First X-Men #1–5; Wolverine: Hunger; Wolverine (vol. 2) #-1; Before The Fantastic Four: Ben Grimm & Logan #1–3; Wolverine/Cable; Wolverine: The Amazing Immortal Man & Other Bloody Tales; Wolverine #1000	February 2017	978-1-302-90386-2
The Return of Weapon X			Wolverine vol. 2, #159–176 (1988), and ANNUAL 2000-2001	October 8, 2013	978-0-7851-8523-9
Wolverine Vs. the Marvel Universe			Marvel Comics Presents #117–122; Captain America Annual #8; Daredevil (vol. 1) #249; Spider-Man Vs. Wolverine; Incredible Hulk (vol. 1) #340; Wolverine (vol. 2) #134; Wolverine Vs. Thor #1–3; Marvel Universe Vs. Wolverine #1–4	March 2017	978-1-302-90465-4
Wolverine by Greg Rucka Ultimate Collection			Wolverine (vol. 3) #1–19	January 2012	978-0-7851-5845-5
Wolverine: Enemy of the State Ultimate Collection			Wolverine (vol. 3) #20–32	June 2008; October 2006	SC: 978-0-7851-3301-8; HC: 978-0-7851-2206-7
Wolverine by Daniel Way: The Complete Collection	1		Wolverine (1988) #187-189, Wolverine (2003) #33-40, Wolverine: Origins #1-5 and #1 Director's Cut, Sabretooth (2004) #1-4, and Material From I (Heart) Marvel: My Mutant Heart #1	January 2017	978-1-302-90472-2
Wolverine by Daniel Way: The Complete Collection	2		Wolverine (vol. 3) #50–55; Wolverine: Origins #6–15, Annual #1; What If: Wolverine #1	September 2017	978-1-302-90738-9
Wolverine by Daniel Way: The Complete Collection	3		Wolverine: Origins #16–32; X-Men: Original Sin #1; X-Men: Legacy #217–218; "One Percenter" stories from Wolverine (vol. 3) #73–74	February 2018	978-1-302-90768-6
Wolverine by Daniel Way: The Complete Collection	4		Wolverine: Origins #33–50; Dark Wolverine #85–86	June 2018	978-1-302-90952-9
Wolverine by Jason Aaron: The Complete Collection	1		Wolverine (vol. 3) #56, 62–65; material from #73–74; Wolverine: Manifest Destiny 1–4; Wolverine: Weapon X 1–5; material from Wolverine (vol. 2) #175	December 2013	978-0-7851-8541-3
Wolverine by Jason Aaron: The Complete Collection	2		Wolverine: Weapon X #6–16; Dark Reign: The List – Wolverine #1; Dark X-Men: The Beginning #3; All-New Wolverine Saga	April 2014	978-0-7851-8576-5
Wolverine by Jason Aaron: The Complete Collection	3		Wolverine (vol. 4) #1–9, 5.1; Astonishing Spider-Man & Wolverine #1–6; material from Wolverine: Road to Hell #1	August 2014	978-0-7851-8908-4
Wolverine by Jason Aaron: The Complete Collection	4		Wolverine (vol. 4) #10–20, 300–304	December 2014	978-0-7851-8909-1
Death of Wolverine	Prelude: Three Months To Die		Wolverine (vol. 6) #1–12, Annual #1	April 2020	978-1-302-92283-2
Death of Wolverine	The Complete Collection		Death of Wolverine #1–4; Death of Wolverine: The Weapon X Program #1–5; Death of Wolverine: Logan Legacy #1–7; Death of Wolverine: Deadpool & Captain America #1; Death of Wolverine: Life After Logan #1	May 2018	978-1-302-91242-0
Death of Wolverine	Companion		Wolverine & the X-Men (vol. 2) #10–11; Nightcrawler (vol. 4) #7; Wolverines #1–20	March 2019	978-1-302-91610-7
Hunt for Wolverine			Hunt For Wolverine #1, Hunt For Wolverine: Weapon Lost #1-4, Hunt For Wolverine: Adamantium Agenda #1-4, Hunt For Wolverine: Claws Of A Killer #1-4, Hunt For Wolverine: Mystery In Madripoor #1-4, Where's Wolverine pages	November 2018	HC: 978-1-302-91301-4
X Lives of Wolverine and X Deaths of Wolverine			X Lives of Wolverine (2022) #1-5, X Deaths of Wolverine (2022) #1-5	December 2022	HC: 978-1-302-93122-3 SC: 978-1-302-93123-0
Wolverine by Benjamin Percy	1		Wolverine (2020) #1-5, 8-12	April 2022	
Wolverine by Benjamin Percy	2		Wolverine (2020) #13-25	March 2023	
Wolverine by Benjamin Percy	3		Wolverine (2020) #26-32, #33 (A story) and #34-35 and #37-40..	June 2024	

=== Main series ===
Title	Vol.	Vol. title	Material collected	Publication date	ISBN
Wolverine			Wolverine #1–4; Uncanny X-Men #172–173	January 2007	HC: 978-0-7851-2329-3
Wolverine			Wolverine #1–4; Uncanny X-Men #172–173	March 2009	SC: 978-0-7851-3724-5
Wolverine			Wolverine #1–4; Uncanny X-Men #172–173	June 18, 2013	
Wolverine Classic	1		Wolverine vol. 2, #1–5	April 2005	978-0-7851-1797-1
Wolverine Classic	2		Wolverine vol. 2, #6–10	September 2005	978-0-7851-1877-0
Wolverine Classic	3		Wolverine vol. 2, #11–16	May 2006	978-0-7851-2053-7
Wolverine Classic	4		Wolverine vol. 2, #17–23	September 2006	978-0-7851-2054-4
Wolverine Classic	5		Wolverine vol. 2, #24–30	September 2007	978-0-7851-2739-0
Wolverine by Larry Hama & Marc Silvestri	1		Wolverine vol. 2, #31–37; Wolverine: The Jungle Adventure; Wolverine: Bloodlust	July 9, 2013	978-0-7851-8451-5
Wolverine by Larry Hama & Marc Silvestri	2		Wolverine vol. 2, #38–46; Wolverine: Rhane of Terra	February 4, 2014	978-0-7851-8871-1
Wolverine	Weapon X Unbound		Wolverine vol. 2, #47–57	January 24, 2017	978-1-302-90388-6
Wolverine Legends	6	Marc Silvestri	Wolverine vol. 2, #31–34, 41–42, 48–50	May 2004	978-0-7851-0952-5
Wolverine	Not Dead Yet		Wolverine vol. 2, #119–122	December 1998; May 2009	SC: 978-0-7851-0704-0; HC: 978-0-7851-3766-5
Wolverine	Blood Wedding		Wolverine vol. 2, #123–132, and Wolverine: Black Rio	December 1998; May 2009	978-0-7851-8524-6; 978-0-7851-8524-6
X-Men vs. Apocalypse	1	The Twelve	Wolverine vol. 2, #146–147; Cable #73–76; Uncanny X-Men #376–377; X-Men #96–97	March 2008	978-0-7851-2263-0
X-Men vs. Apocalypse	2	Ages of Apocalypse	Wolverine vol. 2, #148; Cable #77; Uncanny X-Men #378, Annual '99; X-51 #8; X-Men #98; X-Men Unlimited #26; X-Men: The Search for Cyclops #1–4	September 2008	978-0-7851-2264-7
Wolverine	Blood Debt		Wolverine vol. 2, #150–153	July 2001	978-0-7851-0785-9
Wolverine	The Best There Is		Wolverine vol. 2, #159–161, 167–169	September 2002	978-0-7851-1007-1
The Return of Weapon X			Wolverine vol. 2, #159–176 and Annual 2000-2001	October 8, 2013	978-0-7851-8523-9
Wolverine/Deadpool	Weapon X		Wolverine vol. 2, #162–166; Deadpool #57–60	August 2002	978-0-7851-0918-1
Wolverine Legends	3	Law of the Jungle	Wolverine vol. 2, #181–186	March 2003	978-0-7851-1135-1
Wolverine by Greg Rucka	1	The Brotherhood	Wolverine (vol. 3) #1–6	February 2004	978-0-7851-1136-8
Wolverine by Greg Rucka	2	Coyote Crossing	Wolverine (vol. 3) #7–11	May 2004	978-0-7851-1137-5
Wolverine by Greg Rucka	3	Return of the Native	Wolverine (vol. 3) #12–19	October 2004	978-0-7851-1397-3
Wolverine: Enemy of the State	1		Wolverine (vol. 3) #20–25	October 2006; May 2005	SC: 978-0-7851-1492-5; HC: 978-0-7851-1815-2
Wolverine: Enemy of the State	2		Wolverine (vol. 3) #26–32	June 2006; December 2005	SC: 978-0-7851-1627-1; HC: 978-0-7851-1926-5
House of M	World of M, Featuring Wolverine		Wolverine (vol. 3) #33–35; Black Panther vol. 4, #7; Captain America vol. 5, #10; The Pulse #10	March 2006	978-0-7851-1922-7
Decimation	Origins and Endings		Wolverine (vol. 3) #36–40	December 2006; May 2006	SC: 978-0-7851-1979-1; HC: 978-0-7851-1977-7
Blood and Sorrow			Wolverine (vol. 3) #41, 49; Giant-Size Wolverine #1; X-Men Unlimited #12	July 2007	978-0-7851-2607-2
Civil War: Wolverine			Wolverine (vol. 3) #42–48	May 2007	978-0-7851-1980-7
Evolution			Wolverine (vol. 3) #50–55	March 2008; November 2007	SC: 978-0-7851-2256-2; HC: 978-0-7851-2255-5
The Death of Wolverine			Wolverine (vol. 3) #56–61	July 2008; April 2008	SC: 978-0-7851-2612-6; HC: 978-0-7851-2611-9
Get Mystique			Wolverine (vol. 3) #62–65	August 2008	978-0-7851-2963-9
Old Man Logan			Wolverine (vol. 3) #66–72; Wolverine: Old Man Logan Giant-Size	September 2010; October 2009	SC: 978-0-7851-3172-4; HC: 978-0-7851-3159-5
Dark Wolverine	1	The Prince	Wolverine (vol. 3) #73–74 (back stories); Dark Wolverine #75–77	March 2010; November 2009	SC: 978-0-7851-3866-2; HC: 978-0-7851-3900-3
Dark Wolverine	2	My Hero	Dark Wolverine vol. 3, #78–81	March 2010	SC: 978-0-7851-3867-9; HC: 978-0-7851-3977-5
Siege: X-Men			Dark Wolverine #82-84, New Mutants (vol. 3) #11, Siege: Storming Asgard - Heroes & Villains #1	August 2010	978-0-7851-4815-9
Wolverine: The Reckoning			Dark Wolverine #85-87, Wolverine: Origins #46-50	October 2010	978-0-7851-3978-2
Punisher: Franken-Castle			Dark Wolverine #88-89, Punisher (vol. 8) #11-16, Franken-Castle #17-21, Dark Reign: The List - Punisher #1	December 2010	978-0-7851-4754-1
Daken: Dark Wolverine - Punishment			Dark Wolverine #75-89, Dark Reign: The List - Punisher #1, Wolverine: Origins #47-48, Franken-Castle #19-20, Dark Wolverine Saga #1	July 2017	978-1-302-90686-3
Daken: Dark Wolverine	1	Empire	Dark Wolverine #90, Daken: Dark Wolverine #1-4	February 2011	978-0-7851-4705-3
Wolverine Goes to Hell			Wolverine (vol. 4) #1–5	January 2011; February 2011	SC: 978-0-7851-4785-5; HC: 978-0-7851-4784-8
Wolverine Vs. The X-Men			Wolverine (vol. 4) #6–9 & 5.1	June 2011	SC: 978-0-7851-4787-9; HC: 978-0-7851-4786-2
Wolverine's Revenge			Wolverine (vol. 4) #10–16	November 2011	SC: 978-0-7851-5279-8; HC: 978-0-7851-5279-8
Wolverine	Goodbye, Chinatown		Wolverine (vol. 4) #17–20	April 2012	HC: 978-0-7851-6141-7
Wolverine	Back in Japan		Wolverine #300–304	July 2012	HC: 978-0-7851-6143-1
Wolverine	Rot		Wolverine #305–309	September 2012	HC: 978-0-7851-6145-5
Wolverine	Sabretooth Reborn		Wolverine #310–313	February 2013	HC: 978-0-7851-6325-1
Wolverine	Covenant		Wolverine #314–317	April 2013	TPB: 978-0-7851-6467-8
Wolverine Volume 1: Hunting Season			Wolverine (vol. 5) #1–6	September 2013	978-0-7851-8396-9
Wolverine Volume 2: Killable			Wolverine (vol. 5) #7–13	March 25, 2014	SC: 978-0-7851-8397-6
Wolverine Volume 2: Three Months to Die Book 1			Wolverine (vol. 6) #1-7	August 2014	
Wolverine Volume 2: Three Months to Die Book 2			Wolverine (vol. 6) #8-12, Annual #1	December 9, 2014	SC: 978-0-7851-5420-4
Death of Wolverine	Prelude: Three Months To Die		Wolverine (vol. 6) #1–12, Annual #1	April 2020	978-1-302-92283-2
Death of Wolverine	The Complete Collection		Death of Wolverine #1–4; Death of Wolverine: The Weapon X Program #1–5; Death of Wolverine: Logan Legacy #1–7; Death of Wolverine: Deadpool & Captain America #1; Death of Wolverine: Life After Logan #1	May 2018	978-1-302-91242-0
Death of Wolverine	Companion		Wolverine & the X-Men (vol. 2) #10–11; Nightcrawler (vol. 4) #7; Wolverines #1–20	March 2019	978-1-302-91610-7
Hunt for Wolverine			Hunt For Wolverine #1, Hunt For Wolverine: Weapon Lost #1-4, Hunt For Wolverine: Adamantium Agenda #1-4, Hunt For Wolverine: Claws Of A Killer #1-4, Hunt For Wolverine: Mystery In Madripoor #1-4, Where's Wolverine pages	November 2018	HC: 978-1-302-91301-4
Return of Wolverine			Return of Wolverine #1-5	April 2019	978-1-302-91198-0
Wolverine: Infinity Watch			Wolverine: Infinity Watch #1-5	September 10, 2019	978-1-302-91581-0
Wolverine by Benjamin Percy Vol 1			Wolverine (vol. 7) #1-5	December 2020	978-1-302-92182-8
Wolverine by Benjamin Percy Vol 2			Wolverine (vol. 7) #8-12	September 2021	978-1-302-92183-5
Wolverine by Benjamin Percy Vol 3			Wolverine (vol. 7) #14-19	February 2022	978-1-302-92725-7
Wolverine by Benjamin Percy Vol 4			Wolverine (vol. 7) #20-25	December 2022	978-1-302-92726-4
Wolverine by Benjamin Percy Vol 5			Wolverine (vol. 7) #26-30	June 2023	978-1-302-93297-8
Wolverine by Benjamin Percy Vol 6			Wolverine (vol. 7) #31-35	October 2023	978-1-302-94764-4
Wolverine by Benjamin Percy Vol 7			Wolverine (vol. 7) #36-40	March 2024	978-1-302-95153-5
Wolverine by Benjamin Percy Vol 8			Wolverine (vol. 7) #41-45	June 2024	978-1-302-95472-7
Wolverine by Benjamin Percy Vol 9			Wolverine (vol. 7) #46-50	August 2024	978-1-302-95473-4

=== Wolverine: Origins ===
Title	Vol.	Vol. title	Material collected	Publication date	ISBN
Wolverine: Origins	1	Born in Blood	Wolverine: Origins #1–5	April 2007; November 2006	SC: 978-0-7851-2287-6; HC: 978-0-7851-2285-2
Wolverine: Origins	2	Savior	Wolverine: Origins #6–10	October 2007; March 2007	SC: 978-0-7851-2288-3; HC: 978-0-7851-2286-9
Wolverine: Origins	3	Swift and Terrible	Wolverine: Origins #11–15	November 2007; August 2007	SC: 978-0-7851-2613-3; HC: 978-0-7851-2637-9
Wolverine: Origins	4	Our War	Wolverine: Origins #16–20, Annual #1	June 2008; February 2008	SC: 978-0-7851-2614-0; HC: 978-0-7851-2638-6
Wolverine: Origins	5	Deadpool	Wolverine: Origins #21–27	December 2008; September 2008	SC: 978-0-7851-2615-7; HC: 978-0-7851-2639-3
X-Men	Original Sin		Wolverine: Origins #28–30; X-Men: Original Sin #1; X-Men: Legacy #217–218	August 2009; February 2009	SC: 978-0-7851-2956-1; HC: 978-0-7851-3038-3
Wolverine: Origins	6	Dark Reign	Wolverine: Origins #31–36	December 2009; September 2009	SC: 978-0-7851-3538-8; HC: 978-0-7851-3628-6
Wolverine: Origins	7	Romulus	Wolverine: Origins #37–40	April 2010; December 2009	SC: 978-0-7851-3539-5; HC: 978-0-7851-3629-3
Wolverine: Origins	8	Seven the Hard Way	Wolverine: Origins #41–45	September 2010; April 2010	SC: 978-0-7851-4649-0; HC: 978-0-7851-4648-3
Wolverine: Origins	9	The Reckoning	Wolverine: Origins #46–50; Dark Wolverine #85–87	October 2010	HC: 978-0-7851-3978-2

=== Wolverine: First Class ===
Title	Vol. title	Material collected	Publication date	ISBN
Wolverine: First Class	The Rookie	Wolverine: First Class #1–4; The Incredible Hulk #181	October 2008	978-0-7851-3316-2
Wolverine: First Class	To Russia With Love	Wolverine: First Class #5–8; The Uncanny X-Men #139–140	February 2009	978-0-7851-3317-9
Wolverine: First Class	Wolverine by Night	Wolverine: First Class #9–12	April 2009	978-0-7851-3534-0
Wolverine: First Class	Ninjas, Gods and Divas	Wolverine: First Class #13–16; X-Men and Power Pack #1	August 2009	978-0-7851-3535-7
Wolverine: First Class	Class Actions	Wolverine: First Class #17–21	February 2010	978-0-7851-3678-1
Weapon X: First Class	Wolverine: Tales of Weapon X	Weapon X: First Class #1-3, Wolverine: First Class #1-2 And Wolverine And Power Pack #2	November 2009	

=== Wolverine: Weapon X ===
Title	Material collected	Publication date	ISBN
Wolverine: Weapon X, Vol. 1: The Adamantium Men	Wolverine: Weapon X #1–5; Wolverine vol. 3, #73–74	April 2010; November 2009	SC: 978-0-7851-4111-2; HC: 978-0-7851-4017-7
Wolverine: Weapon X, Vol. 2: Insane in the Brain	Wolverine: Weapon X #6–10	July 2010; March 2010	SC: 978-0-7851-4112-9; HC: 978-0-7851-4018-4
Wolverine: Weapon X, Vol. 3: Tomorrow Dies Today	Wolverine: Weapon X #11–16; Dark Reign: The List – Wolverine	October 2010; March 2011	SC: 978-0-7851-4651-3; HC: 978-0-7851-4650-6

=== Wolverine and the X-Men ===
Title	Material collected	Publication date	ISBN
Wolverine and the X-Men, Vol. 1	Wolverine and the X-Men (vol. 1) #1–4	May 2, 2012	978-0-7851-5679-6
Wolverine and the X-Men: Alpha & Omega	Wolverine & the X-Men: Alpha & Omega (vol. 1) #1–5	July 2012	978-0-7851-6400-5
Wolverine and the X-Men, Vol. 2	Wolverine and the X-Men (vol. 1) #5–8	September 5, 2012	978-0-7851-5681-9
Wolverine and the X-Men, Vol. 3	Wolverine and the X-Men (vol. 1) #9–13	October 10, 2012	978-0-7851-5999-5
Wolverine and the X-Men, Vol. 4	Wolverine and the X-Men (vol. 1) #14–18	January 8, 2013	978-0-7851-6542-2
Wolverine and the X-Men, Vol. 5	Wolverine and the X-Men (vol. 1) #19–24	July 16, 2013	978-0-7851-6577-4
Wolverine and the X-Men, Vol. 6	Wolverine and the X-Men (vol. 1) #25–29	September 24, 2013	978-0-7851-6599-6
Wolverine and the X-Men, Vol. 7	Wolverine and the X-Men (vol. 1) #30–35	October 2013	978-0-7851-6600-9
X-Men: Battle of the Atom	X-Men: Battle of the Atom (vol. 1) #1–2; All-New X-Men (vol. 1) 16–17; X-Men (vol. 4) #5–6; Uncanny X-Men (vol. 3) #12–13; Wolverine and the X-Men (vol. 1) #36–37	January 21, 2014	Hardcover: 978-0-7851-8906-0 Paperback: 978-1-84653-572-7
Wolverine and the X-Men, Vol. 8	Wolverine and the X-Men (vol. 1) #38–42; Wolverine and the X-Men Annual (vol. 1) #1	September 24, 2013	978-0-7851-6601-6
Wolverine & the X-Men by Jason Aaron Omnibus	Wolverine and the X-Men (vol. 1) #1–35 & 38–42; Wolverine and the X-Men Annual (vol. 1) #1	June 17, 2014	978-0-7851-9024-0
Wolverine and the X-Men, Volume 1: Tomorrow Never Learns	Wolverine and the X-Men (vol. 2) #1–6	November 18, 2014	Paperback: 978-0-7851-8992-3
Wolverine and the X-Men, Volume 2: Death of Wolverine	Wolverine and the X-Men (vol. 2) #7–12	February 17, 2015	Paperback: 978-0-7851-8993-0

=== Wolverine: The Best There Is ===
Title	Material collected	Publication date	ISBN
Wolverine: The Best There Is: Contagion	Wolverine: The Best There Is #1-6	July 2011	
Wolverine: The Best There Is: Broken Quarantine	Wolverine: The Best There Is #7-12	July 2012	
Wolverine: The Best There Is: The Complete Series	Wolverine: The Best There Is #1-12	May 2013	

=== Savage Wolverine ===
Title	Material collected	Publication date	ISBN
Savage Wolverine Vol. 1: Kill Island; Wolverine by Frank Cho: Savage Land	Savage Wolverine #1-5	August 2013	
Savage Wolverine Vol. 2: Hands on a Dead Body	Savage Wolverine #6-11	February 2014	
Savage Wolverine Vol. 3: Wrath	Savage Wolverine #12-17	July 2014	
Savage Wolverine Vol. 4: The Best There Is	Savage Wolverine #18-23	August 2015	

=== Marvel Comics Presents featuring Wolverine ===
Title	Material collected	Publication date	ISBN
Marvel Comics Presents: Wolverine, Vol. 1	Marvel Comics Presents #1–10	July 2005	978-0-7851-1826-8
Marvel Comics Presents: Wolverine, Vol. 2	Marvel Comics Presents #39–50	January 2006	978-0-7851-1883-1
Marvel Comics Presents: Wolverine, Vol. 3	Marvel Comics Presents #51–61	June 2006	978-0-7851-2065-0
Marvel Comics Presents: Wolverine, Vol. 4	Marvel Comics Presents #62–71	December 2006	978-0-7851-2066-7
Wolverine and Ghost Rider in Acts of Vengeance	Marvel Comics Presents #64-70	1993	0-7851-0022-9
Wolverine: Weapon X	Marvel Comics Presents #72–84	March 2009; March 2007	SC: 978-0-7851-3726-9; HC: 978-0-7851-2327-9
Wolverine: Blood Hungry	Marvel Comics Presents #85–92	December 1993	978-0-7851-0003-4
Wolverine: Prehistory	Marvel Comics Presents #93–98; Wolverine (2003) #32; Logan: Path of the Warlord, Shadow Society; Wolverine: Agent of Atlas #1-3; First X-Men #1-5; Wolverine: Hunger; Wolverine (1988) -#1; Before The Fantastic Four: Ben Grimm & Logan #1-3; Wolverine/Cable; Wolverine: the Amazing Immortal Man & Other Bloody Tales, Wolverine (2010) #1000	February 2017	978-1-302-90386-2
Wolverine: Typhoid's Kiss	Marvel Comics Presents #109–116	May 1994	978-0-7851-0056-0
Wolverine Vs. the Marvel Universe	Marvel Comics Presents #117–122; Captain America Annual #8; Daredevil (1964) #249; Spider-Man Vs. Wolverine, Incredible Hulk (1968) #340, Wolverine (1988) #134, Wolverine Vs. Thor #1-3, Marvel Universe Vs. Wolverine #1-4	March 2017	978-1-302-90465-4

=== Other ===
Title	Material collected	Publication date	ISBN
Wolverine Legends, Vol. 1: Hulk/Wolverine	Hulk/Wolverine #1-4	March 2003	
Wolverine Legends, Vol. 2: Meltdown	Havok and Wolverine: Meltdown #1–4	March 2003	978-0-7851-1048-4
Wolverine Legends, Vol. 3: Law of the Jungle	Wolverine (Vol 2) #181-186	March 2003	
Wolverine Legends, Vol. 4: Xisle	Wolverine: Xisle #1–5	July 2003	978-0-7851-1221-1
Wolverine Legends, Vol. 5: Snikt	Wolverine: Snikt! #1–5	January 2004	
Wolverine: Soultaker	Wolverine: Soultaker #1–5	August 2005	978-0-7851-1505-2
Wolverine: Origin	Origin #1–6	March 2006; October 2006	SC: 978-0-7851-3727-6; HC: 978-0-7851-2328-6
Wolverine: Origin II	Origin II #1–5	August 2014; April 2015	SC: 978-0-7851-9032-5; HC: 978-0-7851-8481-2
Wolverine: The End	Wolverine: The End #1–6	May 2007	978-0-7851-1349-2
Wolverine: Dangerous Games	Wolverine: Deathsong; Wolverine: Dangerous Games; Wolverine: Firebreak; Wolverine: Killing Made Simple;	December 2008	978-0-7851-3471-8
X-Men: Manifest Destiny	Wolverine: Manifest Destiny #1-4; X-Men Manifest Destiny: Nightcrawler #1, and X-Men: Manifest Destiny #1-5	September 2009	978-0-7851-3951-5
X-Men: Wolverine/Gambit	Wolverine/Gambit: Victims #1–4	June 2002; November 2009	SC: 978-0-7851-0896-2; HC: 978-0-7851-3802-0
Kitty Pryde and Wolverine	Kitty Pryde and Wolverine #1–6	June 2008	0-7851-3089-6
Wolverine and Jubilee	Wolverine and Jubilee #1-4	June 29, 2011	HC: ISBN 0-7851-5775-1; SC: ISBN 978-0-7851-5775-5
Wolverine: The Amazing Immortal Man and Other Bloody Tales	Wolverine #900, #1000; Wolverine Annual (2007) #2; Rampaging Wolverine #1; Wolverine: The Amazing Immortal Man & Other Bloody Tales, Under The Boardwalk, Wendigo!, Carnibrawl, Savage, Mr. X, Dust From Above, Debt Of Death; Material From Wolverine: Switchback	June 2018	
Wolverine: Flies to a Spider	Wolverine: Chop Shop; Wolverine: Switchback; Wolverine Holiday Special: Flies to a Spider; Wolverine: Dead Man's Hand	August 2009	978-0-7851-3569-2
Wolverine Noir	Wolverine Noir #1–4	May 2010; November 2009	SC: 978-0-7851-3547-0; HC: 978-0-7851-3945-4
Elektra & Wolverine: The Redeemer	Elektra & Wolverine: The Redeemer #1-3	May 2002	
Hulk/Wolverine: 6 Hours	Hulk/Wolverine: 6 Hours #1–4; The Incredible Hulk #181	May 2003	978-0-7851-1157-3
Wolverine and Captain America	Wolverine and Captain America #1-4, Wolverine #124	2004	
Spider-Man Legends Vol 4: Spider-Man and Wolverine	Spider-Man and Wolverine #1-4	March 2004	
Astonishing Spider-Man & Wolverine	Astonishing Spider-Man & Wolverine #1-6	November 2012 August 2011	SC: HC:
Wolverine/Black Cat: Claws	Wolverine/Black Cat: Claws #1–3	February 2010; February 2007	SC: 978-0-7851-4285-0; HC: 978-0-7851-1850-3
Wolverine/Black Cat: Claws 2	Wolverine/Black Cat: Claws 2 #1–3; Killraven (2001) #1	May 2012 November 2011	SC: HC:
Wolverine/Hercules: Myths, Monsters & Mutants	Wolverine/Hercules: Myths, Monsters & Mutants #1-4, material from Marvel Treasury Edition #26	August 2011	
Wolverine & Nick Fury	Wolverine/Nick Fury: The Scorpio Connection, Wolverine: Bloody Choices And Wolverine & Nick Fury: Scorpio Rising	March 2012	
Wolverine and Power Pack	Wolverine and Power Pack #1-4	2009	
Marvel Platinum: The Definitive Wolverine	Origin #2; Marvel Comics Presents #79; Incredible Hulk #181; Uncanny X-Men #109; Wolverine #1–4; Spider-Man vs. Wolverine #1; X-Men #25; Wolverine #75, #145	April 2009	978-1-84653-409-6
Wolverine: Logan	Logan #1–3	April 2009; September 2008	SC: 978-0-7851-3414-5; HC: 978-0-7851-3425-1
Wolverine: Season One	Wolverine: Season One OGN	June 2013	
Wolverine vs. Punisher	Punisher War Journal #6-7, Wolverine/Punisher: Damaging Evidence #1-3, Punisher War Zone #19, Wolverine/Punisher: Revelation #1-4, Punisher #16-17, Wolverine #186, Wolverine/Punisher #1-5, Astonishing Tales: Wolverine/Punisher #1-6	April 2017	
Wolverine: The Long Night	Wolverine: The Long Night Adaptation #1-5	July 2019	
Wolverine: The Daughter of Wolverine	Material from Marvel Comics Presents (2019) #1-9	March 2020	
Wolverine: Black, White and Blood	Wolverine: Black, White and Blood #1-4	August 2021	
Wolverine: Patch	Wolverine: Patch #1-5	November 2022	978-1-302-93206-0
Wolverine: Madripoor Knights	Wolverine: Madripoor Knights #1-5	January 2025	
Wolverine: Deep Cut	Wolverine: Deep Cut #1-4	April 2025	
Wolverine: Revenge	Wolverine: Revenge #1-5	June 2025	
Deadpool and Wolverine: WWIII	Deadpool and Wolverine: WWIII #1-3	October 2024	
Venom War: Wolverine/Deadpool	Venom War: Wolverine #1-3, Venom War: Deadpool #1-3, Venom War: Carnage #1-3	April 2025	
