= C. E. Murphy =

American-Irish fantasy and romance writer

Catherine E. Murphy (C.E. Murphy)
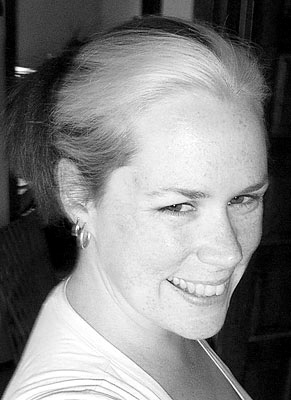
- Murphy in 2005
- Born: June 1, 1973 (age 53); Kenai, Alaska, U.S.
- Occupation: Writer
- Writing career
- Pen name: Catie Murphy, Murphy Lawless, Zoe Chant, Cate Dermody
- Genres: Science fiction, fantasy, mystery, romance
- Website: catiemurphy.com

Catherine E. Murphy, writing primarily under the byline C. E. Murphy, (born June 1, 1973) is an American-born author, based in Ireland, who writes in the fantasy and romance genres. She is the author of the Walker Papers series, The Negotiator Trilogy, and the Inheritor's Cycle as well as The Strongbox Chronicles (written under a pseudonym). She has also written the graphic novel Take a Chance.

== Biography ==
C. E. Murphy is an Alaskan-born writer of fantasy novels, short stories and comic books. She has also written a romance novel trilogy under the pseudonym Cate Dermody, which was her grandmother's maiden name.

She became an Irish citizen by grandparental descent in 2001, moved to Ireland in 2005, and as of 2020, continued to live there with her husband and son.

Along with writing, she has worked at various points as a library volunteer, archival assistant, cannery worker, and web designer. However writing is her primary hobby.

== Bibliography ==
Although best known for her work in speculative fiction, Murphy has published in multiple genres, using several pen names for non-fantastic works, e.g., writing mysteries as Catie Murphy.

As of 2021, the author's works, grouped by series, include:

=== The Walker Papers ===
- Urban Shaman (2005)
  - Magic Hath an Element (first part of Urban Shaman from an alternate viewpoint)
  - Banshee Cries in the Winter Moon anthology (2009) with Mercedes Lackey and Tanith Lee
- Thunderbird Falls (2006)
- Coyote Dreams (2007)
  - Rabbit Tricks (2009, online)
- Walking Dead (2009)
- Demon Hunts (2010)
- Spirit Dances (2011)
  - Forgotten But By a Few (short story)
  - Easy Pickings (December 2011) (novella, co-author with Faith Hunter)
- Raven Calls (2012)
  - No Dominion (April 2012) (novella)
- Mountain Echoes (January 2013)
- Shaman Rises (July 2014, final book in the series)
  - Spite House (July 26, 2016) (short story, co-author with Kat Richardson)
  - Rabbit Tricks (short story)
  - Five Card Draw (2013) (short story)

=== The Old Races Universe ===
==== The Negotiator Trilogy ====
- Heart of Stone (2007)
- House of Cards (2008)
- Hands of Flame (2008)

==== Other books ====
- The Old Races: Origins (2012, short story collection), background for this universe
- Year of Miracles (2010, collection, some prequels to the trilogy including Year of Miracles (novella, also published separately))
- Baba Yaga's Daughter & Other Tales of the Old Races (2012, collection), stories set before and after the trilogy
- The Old Races: Aftermath (2012, collection), pieces set after the trilogy
- Kiss of Angels (collection), pieces set after the trilogy

==== Short pieces ====
- Hot Time in the Old Town Tonight (novella)
- From Russia, With Love in the Fantasy Medley anthology (2009) with Kelley Armstrong, Kate Elliott, Robin Hobb, and Yanni Kuznia
- Perchance to Dream in the Dragon's Lure anthology (2010) with Danielle Ackley-McPhail

=== The Worldwalker Duology ===
- Truthseeker (2010)
- Wayfinder (2011)

=== The Austen Chronicles ===
- Magic & Manners A retelling of Pride and Prejudice in a fantasy setting; "It is a truth universally accepted that well-bred members of Society are not beleaguered with magic," but every one of Mrs. Dover's five daughters has a magic talent, some stronger than others.

=== The Inheritors' Cycle ===
- The Queen's Bastard (2008)
- The Pretender's Crown (2009)

=== The Strongbox Chronicles ===
written as Cate Dermody

- The Cardinal Rule (2005)
- The Firebird Deception (2006)
- The Phoenix Law (2006)

=== The Guildmaster Saga ===
Young adult series

- Seamaster
- Stonemaster

=== The Dublin Driver Mysteries ===
A detective fiction series written under the byline "Catie Murphy"

- Dead in Dublin
- Death on the Green
- Death of an Irish Mummy

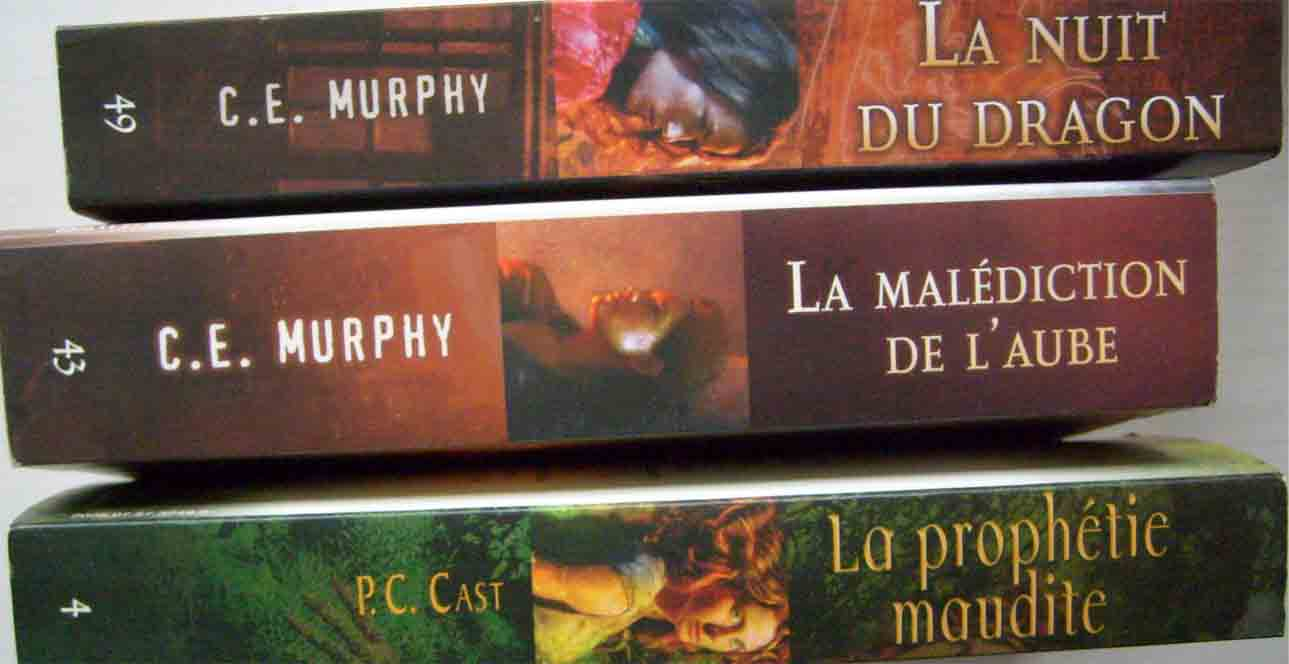

=== The Heartstrike Chronicles ===
- "Atlantis Fallen" (2016)

=== The Lovelorn Chronicles ===
- Bewitching Benedict

=== Other works ===
Novels

- Coming to America
- Stone's Throe
- Roses in Amber

Short Stories

- Cairn Dancer in The Phantom Queen Awakes anthology (2010) with Anya Bast, Elaine Cunningham, and Katharine Kerr
- Blended in the Running with the Pack anthology (2010) with Laura Anne Gilman and Carrie Vaughn
- Them Shoes

Comics

- Take a Chance (2009) a 5 issue comic series for Dabel Brothers with Ardian Syaf (as the artist), with an Issue #0, Previously on Take a Chance added
