= Michael Lent (writer and producer) =

American writer and film producer

- Education: Hamilton College; University of Miami
- Occupations: Writer, producer

Michael Lent is a mixed media writer and producer based in Los Angeles. He is best known as the co-writer of On Thin Ice, the memoirs of Hugh Rowland, one of the stars of the long-running series Ice Road Truckers.

== Career ==
Michael Lent received a BA in American Studies from Hamilton College, and an MFA in Screenwriting and Film from the University of Miami.

Lent began his career interning in the On-Air Promotions Department at MTV Networks where he worked with producers Ted Demme, Mark Pellington, John Payson, and Abby Terkuhle.

From 1997 to 2007, he was a featured columnist and contributing editor for Creative Screenwriting Magazine.

In 2004, Lent's book Breakfast With Sharks: A Screenwriter's Guide to Getting the Meeting, Nailing the Pitch, Signing the Deal, and Navigating the Murky Waters of Hollywood, on the business side of screenwriting, was published by Random House. The introduction to Breakfast With Sharks is by Mike Medavoy, American film producer and executive. The book was a best-seller in the category of film books, and is used in film programs in colleges and universities around the world.

In 2006, Lent co-produced the feature film Hard Scrambled, starring Kurtwood Smith, Richard Edson, Beth Grant, and Alanna Ubach. The film was awarded the Best Narrative Film Award by the Garden State Film Festival and the Best Director award at the Phoenix Film Festival.

Lent also produced the feature film Witches' Night in 2007, starring Gil McKinney and Betsy Baker.

In 2007, Lent's holiday humor book Christmas Letters from Hell: All The News We Hate From The People We Love, was published by Simon & Schuster. The book is a parody of "self-absorbed, aggrandizing" family letters sent out every holiday season; Lent writes from the imagined perspective of Satan and his family. It moved to #2 on Amazon's bestseller list for holiday books. Lent was then part of the Authors@Google series, in which he travelled to Google Headquarters to discuss Christmas Letters From Hell.

Also in 2007, Lent created and co-wrote Prey: Origin of the Species, a graphic novel published by Marvel Comics and Dabel Brothers Publishing.

He is the co-writer of On Thin Ice, published by Hyperion Books in 2010, based on the life of Hugh Rowland, one of the stars of Ice Road Truckers and IRT Deadliest Roads on the History Channel.

In 2008, Lent worked as a writer on the video game Vigilante 8: Arcade, produced by Isopod Labs. Lent was also a writer on the video game SCAPS Agent, published in 2011 by Slime Sandwich.

He is the co-creator and co-writer, with Brian McCarthy, of the Brimstone comic book series published by Zenescope Entertainment in 2011–2012. A film based on the series is currently in development with producer Brett Donowho. Lent and McCarthy also co-authored a series of graphic bios of Stephen King, Keith Richards, JRR Tolkien, and Stephen Hawking that are published by Bluewater/Orbit Productions. The Stephen King bio is in its third printing as of 2015.

Lent executive-produced the 2014 film If You’re Serious, which was nominated for the Verna Fields Award by the Motion Picture Sound Editors.

In 2015, Lent produced the film 2021, written and directed by David Ash, which is premiering at the Twin Cities Film Festival.

He is the author of TMS: The Machine Stops, a graphic novel series published by Alterna Comics in 2015. The story is adapted from the classic E.M. Forster science fiction short story The Machine Stops.

Lent has taught or lectured at UCLA, Chapman University, the University of Miami, and Santa Barbara City College. For more than two years, as part of the UCLA Extension Arts Reach Program, he taught writing to inmates at the Chino Men's Prison.
