= Astonishing Spider-Man & Wolverine =

Comic book miniseries

- Cover art to Astonishing Spider-Man/Wolverine #1. Art by Adam Kubert.

Publication information
- Publisher: Marvel Comics
- Format: Limited series
- Genre: Superhero
- Publication date: May 2010 – May 2011
- No. of issues: 6
- Main character(s): Spider-Man; Wolverine

Creative team
- Written by: Jason Aaron
- Artist: Adam Kubert
- Editor: Nick Lowe

Astonishing Spider-Man & Wolverine is a 2010 – 2011 six-issue comic book miniseries published by Marvel Comics starring Spider-Man and Wolverine. The series is written by Jason Aaron, drawn by Adam Kubert and edited by Nick Lowe.

== Plot ==
65 million years ago, in the Cretaceous Era, a full bearded Peter Parker is looking at the sky with his hand-made telescope and sees an asteroid heading towards the earth. He returns to his shack filled with hand made sculptures made by him of a woman who appears in his dreams. He goes to a valley, to meet with Logan, now a leader of a group called the 'Small Folk'. Peter warns him about the asteroid then leaves.

In a flashback (to the present) Spider-Man and Wolverine attempt to stop Orb and his gang from robbing a bank. Spider-Man hits one of the men and the man drops a bag of glowing diamonds. When the diamonds hits the ground, Spider-Man and Wolverine are sent back in time.

Back in the past, while he tries to prepare for the impact, Logan sees and attacks someone with metallic hair but is interrupted by the meteor impact. The diamonds on Earth suddenly glow; Peter and Logan are transported through time, again. The two arrive in what they initially think is a distorted version of the present era, but in fact turns out to be the future. Wolverine's small-folk survived through the ages, due to the determination he had taught them; they are all that remains of society and venerate Wolverine as the Messiah.

Time has passed. Spider-Man (in costume) is once again preparing for the arrival of some apocalyptic event. He has his assistants looking through the remains of civilization for any kind of super weapon. As Spider-Man returns to his home he is confronted by Orb, who has also been travelling through time. Orb tells him of the Minutemen and the Time Diamonds. As Orb is about to attack Spider-Man, a portal appears and hands of the minute men drag Orb through; Orb screams about "The Czar" just before the portal closes.

Spider-Man receives a call from one of his assistants. At the former X-Men base, diggers have found a box with the Phoenix Force symbol. The threat arrives, revealed to be Doctor Doom, who destroyed civilization while transferring his consciousness into Ego the Living Planet. Spider-Man opens the box, revealing a gun with a bullet containing the Phoenix Force. Logan, who has been trying to avoid the veneration of the small folk as their Messiah, knocks Spider-Man unconscious and takes the gun, knowing that whoever uses it will be destroyed by the Phoenix Force. As Wolverine leaves, two individuals look over the scene.

Spider-Man fails to stop Wolverine from firing the Phoenix Force bullet. Both Planet Doom and Wolverine are destroyed. Logan seems to be in the afterlife being called by the voice of his mother. As Logan was reuniting with his mother Peter uses a re-activated Cosmic Cube to resurrect him. Wolverine lashes out in anger at being pulled back from his final "peace" and Spider-Man, in frustration, fights back. Suddenly time stops around them. Two individuals appear and on hits them both with a bat covered in glowing diamonds. They are sent back in time

Wolverine appears in a wrestling match against a pre-super-hero, teenage Peter Parker. Spider-Man wakes up in Canada covered in meat and is confronted by a young pre-Wolverine James Howlett. The names of the two individuals are revealed to be Czar and Big Murder in various scenes of them jumping through time.

Logan passes the same bank that has the diamonds as he walks with a teenage Peter. When young Peter claims he does not care if Logan robs the bank, Wolverine's eyes flash with fire and he gains insight into his uncle's death that changed Peter into the heroic Spider-Man. Logan enters the bank vault, but is confronted by Czar and Big Murder. In Canada, Spider-Man and young James are cornered near a cave by Dog Logan. As Dog sets an explosion, Spider-Man is blasted into a cave filled with glowing Diamonds; he is sent through various times and sees the woman from his dreams in the bank. He wakes up from the impact and is confronted by Czar and Big Murder. Spider-Man and Wolverine wake up, tied to a pole, about to be burned at the stake. The two realize they are being toyed but Spider-Man shows he has gotten his hands on one of the diamonds

Various camera shots are shown and it is revealed that Mojo has been orchestrating everything, including Spider-Man's dreams, for a reality TV show. Both Spider-Man and Wolverine transport to Mojo's Studio just as Czar is about to warn Mojo that they have a diamond. Spider-Man meets the woman from his dreams; the dreams were implanted by Mojo in preparation for a "Love Interest".

Czar freezes time and retrieves the diamond from Spider-Man, but Wolverine frees himself with a flash of fire. Wolverine takes Czar's hand, along with the club. He then takes Spider-Man to the source of the time diamonds and reveals their history—The time "diamonds" grew on trees on an unstable planet; when the planet exploded, a part of it, along with the diamonds, fell to earth as the meteor in the first book, creating the deposits that would one day be found and mined in Canada—Wolverine and Spider-Man return to face the Czar, armed with their own diamonds. The Phoenix Force bursts from Wolverine during his battle with Czar and he becomes a Dark Phoenix.

Three years have passed for Peter, Logan and the woman from Peter's dreams, Sara Bailey. The three had been transported to the 18th century after Spider-Man managed to talk Wolverine down; the Minutemen had arrived and grabbed Mojo, Czar and Big Murder but missed the three. Logan and Peter become blood brothers. Both Peter and Logan talk about the diamonds Peter could not find in Canada; Peter reveals his plans to propose to Sara, having set the defunct time diamond in an engagement ring. The Minutemen arrived and take Sara, but the diamond, which started glowing again when the Minutemen appeared, transports Logan and Peter, fully costumed, to the bank heist where everything started. Spider-Man then meets with Sara, only to discover that she does not remember him or what has happened.

Closing scenes give closure to the various threads: one of Orb's men meeting with Czar and Big Murder to sell them the original time diamonds; Dog in 18th century entering the mine where the time diamonds are; Beast considering the creation of the Phoenix gun; Doctor Doom researching Ego the Living Planet; and Sara passing archaeological announcements of the statues Peter had made of her. Spider-Man sits by the stump of a tree where he and Sara had carved their initials centuries before; Logan is seen in a bar, drinking and upset.

In the Epilogue, Dog appears in modern-day New York, intent on getting revenge on Logan.

== Collection ==
The limited series has been collected as a part of Jason Aaron's complete collections.

Title	Material Collected	Date	ISBN
Wolverine by Jason Aaron: The Complete Collection 3	Wolverine (vol. 4) #1–9, 5.1; Astonishing Spider-Man & Wolverine #1–6; material from Wolverine: Road to Hell #1	August 2014	978-0785189084

== Reception ==
IGN has given the first issue a ranking 9.1 out of 10, praising the artwork and its concept. The second issue has been given an 8.5 out of 10. The third issue is ranked an 8.5 out of 10. The fourth issue has been ranked 8.5 out of 10. The fifth issue has been ranked a 9 out of 10. IGN has rated the 6th issue, 9 out of 10.
