= Dabel Brothers Productions =

American comic book publishing company

- Founded: 2000 as Roaring Studios
- Founders: Ernst, Les, David and Pascal Dabel
- Country of origin: United States
- Headquarters location: Atlanta, Georgia
- Distribution: Ingram Publisher Services
- Publication types: Comics
- Fiction genres: Fantasy, science fiction, horror, adventure
- Official website: dabelbrothers.com

Dabel Brothers Productions (also known as DB Pro, DBPro, Dabel Brothers Publishing and sometimes Dabel Brothers Production) is a U.S. publishing company of comic books and graphic novels. It was founded in 2001 and is based in Atlanta, Georgia. It is best known for its comic book and graphic novel adaptations of fantasy novels by major authors like Orson Scott Card, Raymond E. Feist, Laurell K. Hamilton, Robert Jordan, George R. R. Martin, R.A. Salvatore, Robert Silverberg, Tad Williams, Jim Butcher, Patricia Briggs, C.E. Murphy, Sherrilyn Kenyon, and Dean Koontz.

During the September 2006 Diamond Retailer Summit in Baltimore, MD, Marvel Comics announced that they would partner with Dabel Brothers Productions, allowing their titles to receive more notice. This agreement fell through with an amicable split, with Marvel retaining the Brothers' rights, as they will go on to publish Dean Koontz's Frankenstein retelling series and others. Dabel Brothers Productions later offered titles to bookstores through an arrangement with Del Rey, and are currently partnered with Dynamite Entertainment.

== History ==
The company was founded in 2000 by the four brothers: Ernst, Les, Pascal, and David Dabel as Roaring Studios. Ernst and Les were both comic book creators with an interest in the fantasy genre. During their first year, the brothers produced several small original comic books. After their first two original titles, The Rift and Waterdogs, received poor reception in the comics market, they looked to adapt George R. R. Martin's fantasy series, A Song of Ice and Fire. However Martin suggested they first adapt his novella that appeared in Robert Silverberg's Legends anthology, The Hedge Knight, which served as a prequel to the A Song of Ice and Fire series. When The Hedge Knight was first released in August 2003 it received positive reception and success in sales. During the six issue run, the studio ended their partnership with the original publisher of the series, Image Comics, and the series switched to Devil's Due for the remainder of its run. The Hedge Knight graphic novel collection went on to become one of the best-selling graphic novels of 2004.

Following their success with The Hedge Knight the Dabel Brothers began acquiring more literary fantasy licenses. After contacting other authors that featured in the Legends anthology they received deals from three of these authors: Robert Silverberg, Raymond E. Feist and Tad Williams. They began production on Silverberg's The Seventh Shrine, Feist's The Wood Boy, and William's The Burning Man. These three productions were originally to be published by Devil's Due but were canceled due to a contract dispute between Roaring Studios and Devil's Due. The split resulted in only one of two issues of The Wood Boy being published. Around the same time the Dabel Brothers lost the right to Dragonlance: Legend of Huma after only five issues were published due to issues with themselves and Hasbro. Devil's Due later acquired the license from Hasbro which included all the Dragonlance properties. They then packaged the final issues of the Huma mini-series, but the remainder of the book remains unadapted.

Roaring Studios was renamed to Dabel Brothers Productions. After their departure from Devil's Due, they aligned with Alias Enterprises to publish XIII. Alias' head creative director is Mike S. Miller who had been partnered with the Dabel Brothers prior to Alias' existence, dating back to the companies series of The Hedge Knight. The partnership later came to an end and the companies went through a public break. During this time the Dabel Brothers were working in conjunction with Red Eagle Entertainment to produce issues of Robert Jordan's New Spring. However, after five issues the parties came into disagreement with the Dabel Brothers alleging that Red Eagle failed to make payments for production and Red Eagle alleging that the Dabels were unable to complete the series in a timely fashion. The issue went into arbitration in court with the Dabel Brothers keeping the rights to the Wheel of Time series.

In 2006, they increased production to seven separate monthly titles with plans to add to the line up in the future. Four months into publication the Dabels suspended publication due to negotiation with Marvel Comics which resulted in a partnership between the two companies. As their deal was being finalized with Marvel, the Dabel Brothers continued to negotiate with other authors to bring their works to comics. Dabel Brothers Production increased production from four to six books per month in addition to trade paperback and hardcover collections of their adaptions under their alliance with Marvel. The imprint continued to focus on licensed adaptations of works by science fiction and fantasy authors along with their original material. The Dabel brothers handled the editorial side of Dabel Brothers Productions while Marvel handled the marketing and publishing. In August 2007, Marvel and Dabel Brothers Production mutually agreed to part ways, with Marvel retaining the rights to the series that were in production so they could be finished to the authors' happiness.

In November 2007, Dabel Brothers signed a deal with the Del Rey imprint of Ballantine Books to handle the distribution of their graphic novels to the bookstore trade. This partnership has led to The Dresden Files: Storm Front Vol. 1 and Mercy Thompson: Homecoming titles to make the New York Times Bestsellers list. Mercy Thompson: Homecoming spent nine weeks on the New York Times Bestsellers list. The Dresden Files original graphic novel The Dresden Files: Welcome to the Jungle was nominated for a 2009 Hugo Award.

In 2008, they were under contract to produce the 2009 calendar for the Song of Ice and Fire series, also by George R.R. Martin. However, due to production delays with the calendar's painter and shipping problems that arose many people who had preordered in 2008 did not receive their 2009 calendars in the timeliest of manners. Martin spoke candidly of the incident on his blog and he subsequently terminated his contract for the calendars. Dabel Brothers and George R.R. Martin continue to work on the Wildcards: Hard Call series whose final issue and graphic novel was released by Dynamite Entertainment in 2010.

A December 2009, announcement revealed that Dynamite Entertainment would be entering into a publishing deal with Dabel Brothers Publishing (for an unknown number of years), where they would be taking over the production of Dabel Brothers titles. Dynamite Entertainment has subsequently taken over production and payments and has become the publisher of record for all Dabel Brothers titles. The first of the Dynamite/Dabel Books was released in April 2010.

== Publications ==
=== Licensed properties ===
George R. R. Martin's The Hedge Knight

- First released: August, 2003
- Publisher: Image Comics (1-3), Devil's Due Publishing (4-6, 1st and 2nd edition of Graphic novel)
- Format: Six issues, reprinted in single graphic novel
- Creative team: George R. R. Martin (writer), Ben Avery (script), Mike S. Miller (pencils), Mike Crowell (inks), Lynx Studios (colors), Bill Tortolini of Lithium Pro (letters and production)

Dragonlance: The Legend of Huma

- Publisher: Devil's Due Publishing
- First released: February, 2004
- Format: Five issues only completed. License moved to Devil's Due.
- Creative team: Richard A. Knaak (writer), Brian Augustyn (1), Sean J. Jordan (1-5) & Trampas Whiteman (3-5) (scripts), Mike S. Miller (1-5), Rael Lyra (1-5), Mike Crowell, Joe Prado (artwork), Lynx Studios, Rod Reis, & Ricardo Riamonde (colors) Bill Tortolini of Lithium Pro (letters and production)

Robert Silverberg's The Seventh Shrine

- Publisher: Image Comics (1), Dabel Brothers Productions (Graphic Novel)
- First released: March, 2005
- Format: Two issues
- Creative team: Robert Silverberg (w), Sean J. Jordan (editor), Bill Tortolini of Lithium Pro (design and production)

Raymond E. Feist's The Wood Boy

- Publisher: Image Comics (1), Dabel Brothers Productions (Graphic Novel)
- First released: May, 2005
- Format: Two issues, the second of which was never published, reprinted in The Wood Boy / The Burning Man graphic novel
- Creative team: Raymond E. Feist (writer), Sean J. Jordan (script), Mat Broome (1), Abdul Rashid (2) (artwork), Stephen Broome (1), David Lanphear (2) (colors), Bill Tortolini of Lithium Pro (letters and production)

Tad Williams's The Burning Man

- Publisher: Dabel Brothers Productions (Graphic Novel)
- First released: March, 2005
- Format: Printed in The Wood Boy / The Burning Man graphic novel (The 3 issues solicited were cancelled in favor of the Trade format)
- Creative team: Tad Williams (writer), Sean J. Jordan & Roynne Gillespie (script), Brett Booth (art), Bobby Souza, Manny Clark, Arif Priyanto and Sakti (colors), Bill Tortolini of Lithium Pro (letters and production)

Robert Jordan's The Wheel of Time: New Spring

- Publisher: Red Eagle Entertainment (1-5), Dabel Brothers (6-8), Tor Books (completed graphic novel version)
- First released: March, 2005
- Format: Eight issues
- Creative Team: Robert Jordan (writer), Chuck Dixon (script), Mike S. Miller, Carlos Paul, Harvey Talibao (art), Bill Tortolini of Lithium Pro (letters and production)

Orson Scott Card's Red Prophet: The Tales Of Alvin Maker

- Publisher: Marvel / Dabel Brothers Productions
- First released: March, 2006
- Second release: October 2006 (Starting with a collected edition of issues 1-2)
- Format: Ongoing
- Creative team: Orson Scott Card (writer), Roland Bernard Brown (script), Renato Arlem (art), David Curiel of Inshield (colors), Bill Tortolini of Lithium Pro (letters and production)

Raymond E. Feist's Magician

- Publisher: Marvel / Dabel Brothers Productions
- First released: March, 2006
- Second release: October 2006 (Starting with a collected edition of issues 1-2)
- Format: Ongoing
- Creative team: Raymond E. Feist (writer), Michael Avon Oeming & Bryan J.L. Glass (script), Brett Booth (art), Jess Booth, Ivan Nunes, Vinicius (colors), Bill Tortolini of Lithium Pro (letters and production)

Laurell K. Hamilton's Anita Blake: Vampire Hunter in Guilty Pleasures

- Publisher: Marvel / Dabel Brothers Productions
- First released: October 2006
- Format: Ongoing
- Creative team: Laurell K. Hamilton (writer), Stacie M. Ritchie (script), Brett Booth (art), Jess Booth (colors), Bill Tortolini of Lithium Pro (letters and production)

Monte Cook's Ptolus: City By the Spire

- Publisher: Marvel / Dabel Brothers Productions
- First released: June, 2006
- Second release: November 2006
- Format: Six issues
- Creative team: Monte Cook (writer), Canaan White, Carlos Paul (art), Inshield (colors), Simon Bowland of Lithium Pro (letters and production)

Orson Scott Card's Wyrms

- Publisher: Marvel / Dabel Brothers Productions
- First released: March, 2006
- Second release: April, 2006
- Format: Six Issues
- Creative team: Orson Scott Card (writer), Jake Black (script), Adriano Batista (art), Frank Martin, Jr. (colors), Simon Bowland of Lithium Pro (letters and production)

XIII

- Publisher: Marvel / Dabel Brothers Productions
- First released: February 2007 (issues 1-5 through Alias, Issue 6 PDF release DBPro)
- Second release: unknown
- Format: Six 144-page TP volumes Un-edited (each 6 U.S. issues, or 3 original albums)
- Creative team: Jean Van Hamme (writer), William Vance (art), Ben Avery (translation), Simon Bowland and Bill Tortolini of Lithium Pro (letters and production)

Michael Lent's Prey: Origin of the Species

- Publisher: Marvel / Dabel Brothers Productions
- First released: April, 2006
- Format: Trade Paperback
- Creative team:Michael Lent (script), Mike Raicht (script), Alex Sanchez, Bong Dazo (art), Alisson Ricardo (colors), Simon Bowland of Lithium Pro (letters and production)

R.A. Salvatore's The Highwayman

- Publisher: Dabel Brothers Productions
- First released: Fall, 2007
- Format: Twelve issues
- Creative team: Matthew Hansen (script), Lithium Pro (letters and production)

Jim Butcher's The Dresden Files

- Publisher: Dabel Brothers Productions
- To be released: April 16, 2008 (Welcome to the Jungle #1), October 21, 2008 (Welcome to the Jungle trade)
- Format: 12-18 issues (32 pages each) per book. Sets of 6 issues will be released in a hardcover collection with bonus material.
- Creative team: Jim Butcher (writer), Ardian Syaf (pencils), Joe Pimentel (inks), Jeremy Treece (colors), Chris McGrath (alternative covers).

George R. R. Martin's Wild Cards: The Hard Call

- First released: April, 2008
- Publisher:
- Format: size issue limited series
- Creative team: George R. R. Martin (writer), Daniel Abraham

Robert Jordan's The Wheel of Time (books 1-12)

- Publisher: Dabel Brothers, Del Ray
- First released: December 2008
- Format: Ongoing
- Creative Team: Robert Jordan (writer), Brandon Sanderson (writer)

=== Original properties ===
Prey: Origin of the Species

- Publisher: Marvel / Dabel Brothers Productions
- First released: Spring 2007
- Format: Graphic Novel
- Created by: Michael Lent
- Creative team: Michael Lent and Mike Raicht (script), Bong Dazo and Alex Sanchez (art), Alison Ricardo, Art Robert Studio and Andrew Dalhouse (colors), Simon Bowland and Matt Moylan (letters and production), Lance Laspina (cover artist)

Legacy: Shards of a Broken Kingdom

- Publisher: Image Comics (1-4), Alias Enterprises (Manga Digest)
- First released: May, 2003
- Format: Four issues
- Created by: Les & Ernst Dabel
- Creative team: Carmen Treffileti (1-3), Sean J. Jordan (4) (script), Eduardo Francisco (art), Lynx Studios (colors), Bill Tortolini of Lithium Pro (letters and production)

Marshal

- Publisher: Marvel / Dabel Brothers Productions
- First released: Spring 2007
- Format: Four issues
- Created by: Bill Tortolini
- Creative team: Bill Tortolini and Andrew Lovuolo (script), Abdul Rashid (art), Edmund of Imaginary Friends Studios (colors), Bill Tortolini of Lithium Pro (letters and production)

Half Dead

- Publisher: Marvel / Dabel Brothers Productions
- First released: March 2007
- Format: Graphic Novel
- Created by: Park Cooper, Barb Lien-Cooper and Jimmy Bott
- Creative team: Park Cooper & Barb Lien-Cooper (script), Jimmy Bott (art), Wes Wong and Dean Welsh (colors), Simon Bowland of Lithium Pro (letters and production)

Minus World

- Publisher: Marvel / Dabel Brothers Productions
- First released: Fall 2007
- Format: Four monthly issues
- Created by: Sean J. Jordan
- Creative team: Sean J. Jordan (script), Jesse Elliot (art), Lithium Pro (letters and production)

Age of Darkness

- Publisher: Marvel / Dabel Brothers Productions
- First released: Spring 2008
- Format: Four monthly issues
- Created by: Ernst Dabel
- Creative team: Ernst Dabel (script), Eduardo Francisco (art), Lithium Pro (letters and production)

Take a Chance

- Publisher: Dabel Brothers Productions
- First released: December 2008
- Format: Five monthly issues
- Created by: C. E. Murphy
- Creative team: C. E. Murphy (script), Ardian Syaf (art), Jason Embury (colorist), Melissa S. Kaercher (letters), and Scott Clark (covers)
