= 1973 in comics =

Notable events of 1973 in comics.

== Events and publications ==
=== Year overall ===
- Dell Comics, after 44 years in the comics business, ceases publication; a few of the company's former titles moved to Gold Key Comics.
- Archie Comics publisher John L. Goldwater licenses Archie for evangelical Christian messages; the comics are written and illustrated by Archie regular Al Hartley and published by Spire Christian Comics.
- Cartoonists Co-Op Press is founded by underground cartoonists Kim Deitch, Bill Griffith, Jerry Lane, Jay Lynch, Willy Murphy, Diane Noomin, and Art Spiegelman in San Francisco.
- In Diane Noomin's book Canarsie Creeps, her character DiDi Glitz makes her debut.
- Irjax Enterprises, a comic book distributor based in Rockville, Maryland, formed. Under the name New Media/Irjax, the company later expanded its distribution business and moved into publishing as well.
- Greek artist Vangelis Saitis starts working on the comic series Pepito Gonzales. He is only 14 years old when his work is published in the magazine Mikros Cow-Boy.

=== January ===
- January 11: F'Murr publishes the first episode of Le Génie des Alpages in Pilote.
- January 3: Bamse's own comic book makes its debut.
- January 4: In Pilote the first chapter of the Astérix story Asterix in Corsica is published by Goscinny and Uderzo.
- January 25: In Pilote, the first chapter of the Lucky Luke story Le grand duc by Goscinny and Morris is published.
- Amazing Adventures #16 and Thor #207 present the Marvel portion of a metafictional unofficial crossover spanning titles from both major comics companies. The DC chapter appeared with a 1972 cover date. Each comic featured writers Steve Englehart, Gerry Conway, and Len Wein, as well as Wein's first wife Glynis, interacting with Marvel or DC characters at the Rutland Halloween Parade in Rutland, Vermont. Beginning in Amazing Adventures #16 (by Englehart with art by Bob Brown and Frank McLaughlin), the story continued in Justice League of America #103 (by Wein, Dick Dillin and Dick Giordano), and concluded in Thor #207 (by Conway and penciler John Buscema).
- Teen Titans, with issue #43 (January /February issue), suspends publication. (DC Comics)

=== February ===
- February 4: The first episode of Dik Browne's Hägar the Horrible is published.
- February 24: The final episode of the biblical text comic Illustrated Sunday School Lesson is published, which ran since 1931.
- February 25: In Corriere dei Ragazzi, Gli aristocratici (The aristocrats) debuts, a gang of gentlemen thieves, created by Alfredo Castelli and Ferdinando Tacconi.
- Action Comics, with #421, Green Arrow became a backup feature, initially rotating with the Human Target and the Atom.
- Doom Patrol vol. 1, with issue #122, is revived by DC after being cancelled in 1968.
- Metal Men, with issue #42 (February /March cover date), is revived by DC after being cancelled in 1970.
- FOOM #1, Marvel's in-house fanzine

=== March ===
- March 19: The first episode of Toon van Driel's long-running comic strip F.C. Knudde is published.
- Robert Crumb and Aline Kominsky publish the first of many crossover comics, where they write and draw themselves and their supposed married lives.

=== April ===
- April 5: In Pilote, the Blueberry story Le hors-la-loi (The Outlaw), by Jean-Michel Charlier and Jean Giraud is published.
- April 8: In Topolino, Paperinika e il filo di Arianna (Super Daisy and the Ariadne's thread), by Guido Martina and Giorgio Cavazzano is published, which marks the debut of Super Daisy (secret identity of Daisy Duck) and her helper Genialina Edy Son.
- April 9: First issue of I quaderni del fumetto (Fratelli Spada), reprints of Italian and American classic comics.
- April 12 : in Pilote, first chapter of Le hors la loi, by Jean-Michel Charlier and Jean Giraud, introducing the Blueberry saga "The plot against Grant".
- April 17: The final episode of Andries Brandt, Robert Hamilton and Richard Klokkers's Aafje Anders is published.
- In Pif Gadget, Leopardi (Leopards) by Hugo Pratt is published, the final episode of the Corto Maltese's "Ethiopic cicle".
- Specific date in April unknown: Dutch illustrator and comic artist Eppo Doeve is knighted in the Order of Orange-Nassau.

=== May ===
- May 8 : in Le journal de Tintin, first chapter of Enquête dans le passé by André-Paul Duchâteau and Tibet.
- May 23: Oğuz Aral's Avanak Avni makes its debut.
- Night Nurse, with issue #4, is cancelled by Marvel.
- In Brazil. Peninha em: Morcego Vermelho, by Ivan Saidenberg and Carlos Edgard Herrero; debut of Red Bat, super-heroic identity of Fethry Duck.

=== June ===
- June 11: The first episode of Glupy by Juan Díaz Rodriguez is published.
- June 14: In Pilote, the first chapter of the Valérian and Laureline story Birds of the master, by Pierre Christin and Jean-Claude Mézières is published
- June 25: The final episode of Quino's Mafalda is published.
- June 29: The final issue of the Spanish comics magazine En Patufet is published.
- Detective Comics, with issue #435 (June/July cover date) begins a bimonthly schedule. (DC Comics)
- Doom Patrol vol 1., with issue #125 (June–July), canceled by DC.
- "The Night Gwen Stacy Died" story arc begins in The Amazing Spider-Man #121, written by Gerry Conway, with art by Gil Kane. (Concludes in Amazing Spider-Man #122, July cover-date.)
- Crazy, with issue #3, canceled by Marvel.
- Number 0 of Undercomics (Editrice Dardo), with the first episode of Cronache del dopobomba (Chronicles after the bomb), dystopic comics by Bonvi, on texts by the songwriter Francesco Guccini. For the new magazine (which does not go beyond the test issue) Silver realizes the first strips of Lupo Alberto (appeared the next year in Corriere dei ragazzi).
- In Eureka, first chapter of Fouchè, un uomo nella rivoluzione (Fouchè, a man in the revolution) by Max Bunker and Paolo Piffarerio.

=== July ===
- July 20: The first episode of Howard Rands' newspaper gag comic Twitch appears in print. The series will run until 1997.
- World's Finest Comics #218: Metamorpho becomes the backup feature after a brief run in Action Comics
- First issue of the SF series UFO, by Renzo Barbieri and Vladimiro Missaglia (Edifumetto), a virtual plagiarism of the TV series of the same name.

=== August ===
- August 2: In Pilote, the first chapter of the Lucky Luke story L'Héritage de Rantanplan, by Goscinny and Morris is published.
- August 16: The final episode of René Goscinny and Jean Tabary's Valentin Le Vagabond is published in Pilote.
- Metal Men, with issue #44 (August /September cover date) goes on hiatus, to be revived in 1976. (DC Comics)
- Shanna the She-Devil, with issue #5, is cancelled by Marvel.

=== September ===
- September 16: In the Italian Disney magazine Topolino, Paperino spia (Donald Duck the spy), by Jerry Siegel and Romano Scarpa is published, in which Gyro Gearloose temporarily becomes a criminal.
- September 19: In Journal de Tintin, the first chapter of the Michel Vaillant story Cauchemar by Jean Graton is published.
- In Grim Wit Den by Richard Corben makes its debut.
- The final issue of the underground comix magazine Yellow Dog is published.

=== October ===
- October 7: In Il Giornalino, Massimo Mattioli's Pinky makes its debut.
- October 15: In Le Nouvel Observateur, the first episode of Claire Bretécher's Les Frustrés is published. It will run until 1981.
- October 22: In Pif Gadget Milo Marat by Bonvi and Mario Gomboli make their debut, a parody of dime novel heroes.
- Detective Comics, with issue #437 (October /November issue), is edited by Archie Goodwin, who in a back-up feature introduces a revival of the "Manhunter" feature with artist Walt Simonson.
- Strange Adventures, with issue #244 (October /November issue), canceled by DC Comics.
- Archie Comics revives its Red Circle Comics superhero imprint, as Red Circle takes over Chilling Adventures in Sorcery as told by Sabrina with issue #3, changing its name to Chilling Adventures in Sorcery.
- Savage Tales, after a 17-month hiatus, resumes publishing with issue #2. (Curtis Magazines)
- Vampire Tales #2: The first appearance of Satana, drawn by John Romita (Marvel Comics)
- Diavolinus, supplement to Linus, focused on the devil's theme; it contains, inter alia, the erotic fantasy Annalisa e il diavolo by Guido Buzzelli

=== November ===
- Kull the Conqueror, with issue #11, changes its name to Kull the Destroyer. (Marvel Comics)
- Marvel Feature, with issue #12, is canceled by Marvel.
- First issue of Cosmine (Ediperiodci), Italian sexy SF series, written by Silverio Pisu.

=== December ===
- Millie the Model, with issue #207, canceled by Marvel.
- From Beyond the Unknown, with issue #25, canceled by DC.
- In Tintin selection, Le Trio maléfique by André-Paul Duchâteau and Tibet.

== Births ==
- January 25: Geoff Johns, American comic book writer and executive (DC Comics).

== Deaths ==
=== January ===
- January 10: Charles Flanders, American comics artist (Robin Hood, assisted on Tim Tyler's Luck and Bringing Up Father, continued Secret Agent X-9, King of the Royal Mounted, and The Lone Ranger), dies at age 65.

=== February ===
- February 10: Chester Sullivan, American comics artist (Men Who Made The World), dies at age 74.
- February 27: Bill Everett, American comics artist (Namor the Sub-Mariner), dies at age 55.

=== March ===
- March 1: Elpidio Torres, Filipino comics artist (Dyesebel), dies at age 47.
- March 4: Walt Ditzen, American comics artist (Fan Fare), dies at age 58.
- March 14: Chic Young, American comics artist (Dumb Dora, Blondie), dies at age 72.

=== April ===
- April 8: Pablo Picasso, Spanish painter and sculptor (made the comic strip The Dream and Lie of Franco and The Bull), dies at age 91.
- April 10: Robert Collard, aka Lortac, French writer, caricaturist, comics writer and artist, illustrator, novelist, painter, art critic, animator, animated film director (wrote Les Pieds Nickelés, Tétar-Zan, Vigor, Tom Tempest, Tim et Tom, Mademoiselle Swing), dies at age 88.

=== May ===
- May 3: Jean Bosc, A.K.A. Bosc, French editorial cartoonist and animator, commits suicide at age 48.
- May 13: Hans Brasch, German painter, illustrator and comics artist, dies at age 91.
- May 21: Yuliy Ganf, Ukrainian cartoonist, painter and illustrator (worked for Krokodil), dies at age 74.
- May 26: Coulton Waugh, American comics artist (Hank, continued Dickie Dare), dies at age 77.

=== June ===
- June 3: Syd Shores, American comics artist (continued Captain America), dies at age 59 from a heart attack.
- June 17: Peter Lutz, Dutch illustrator and comics artist (De Lotgevallen van Witje en Gitje, De Avonturen van Prikkebeen Junior), dies at age 73.
- Specific date unknown: Werner Roth, American comics artist (Lorna the Jungle Girl, continued Uncanny X-Men), dies at age 52.

=== July ===
- July 16: Feg Murray, American athlete, radio presenter and cartoonist (Seein' Stars), dies at age 79.
- July 23: Eddie Rickenbacker, American military pilot and comics writer (Ace Drummond), dies at age 82.
- July 25: Marcel Jeanjean, French illustrator and comics artist (Les Aventures de Tique et Toque), dies at age 80.
- Specific date unknown: Clifton Meek, American comics artist (Johnny Mouse, Grindstone George), dies at age 95.

=== August ===
- August 20: Wam Heskes, Dutch painter, comics artist, illustrator and performer, dies at age 82.

=== September ===
- September 5: Ron Vivian, Australian comics artist (continued Ginger Meggs), dies at age 59.
- September 7: Gaston Ebinger, aka Mop, Belgian illustrator, greeting card designer, advertising artist and comics artist (Rik en Zijn Veiligheidschef, Intermezzo voor Detectives which filled in for Pom's Piet Pienter en Bert Bibber for a few weeks in 1958), dies at age 71.
- September 27: André Rigal, French animator and comic artist (Cap'taine Sabord, Mizo e Friquet, assisted on Zig et Puce), dies at age 75.
- Specific date unknown: Joe Doyle, Irish comics artist (Lonesome Lew, continued Scary William, The Fineheimer Twins, Little Possum Gang, That Irresistible Rag, Excuse Me), dies at age 85.

=== October ===
- October 10: Austin Briggs, American comics artist (continued Flash Gordon and Secret Agent X-9), dies of leukemia at age 65.
- October 18: Walt Kelly, American comics artist (Pogo), dies at age 60.
- October 25: Sebastiano Craveri, Italian comics artist (Zoolandia, Formachino), dies at age 84.
- October 28: Sergio Tòfano, Italian actor, playwright and comics artist (Signor Bonaventura), dies at age 87.

=== November ===
- November 18: Frank Hutchinson, American comics artist (Know-It-All Jake, Superstitious Sam, Willie Hawkshaw the Amateur Detective, Mrs. Economy), dies at age 101.
- November 25: Rex Maxon, American comics artist (Turok, assisted on Tarzan), dies at age 81.

=== December ===
- December 20: George Debels, aka Joe Stan, Belgian-Dutch animator, illustrator and comics artist (Loekie Langoor), dies at age 83.

=== Specific date unknown ===
- Pierre Billon, French illustrator, translator and comics artist (educational comics for the magazine Vaillant), dies at age 73 or 74.
- Ion Deak-Cluj, Romanian comics artist (Stefan Cel Mare, Posada), dies at age 35 or 36.
- Phil DeLara, American animator and comics artist (Looney Tunes comics, Walter Lantz comics, Hanna-Barbera comics, Pink Panther comics), dies at age 59.
- Charles Donelan, American comics artist (Ernest N. Dever, Russett Appul, Sid Sprigley), dies at age 83 or 84.
- Jack Glass, Scottish comics artist (Wilson the Wonder Athlete), dies at an unknown age.
- Philip Mendoza, aka Flam or Flambo, British comics artist, illustrator and political cartoonist (The Man You'd Like to Kick, Princess Petal, Gulliver Guinea-Pig, Katie Country Mouse, Winifred and Stephanie), dies at age 74 or 75.
- Gajo Sakamoto, Japanese manga artist (Tank Tankuro), dies at age 77 or 78.
- Alfred Sindall, British comic artist (Paul Temple, Tug Transom, worked on Biggles), dies at age 72 or 73.
- Liu Xijong, Chinese comics artist, dies at age 58 or 59.

== Conventions ==
=== Europe ===
- February 24: Comic Mart (Lyndhurst Hall, London, England) — second such event, organized by Rob Barrow and Nick Landau
- April 21–23: German Comicon (West Berlin, Germany) — organized by German fan organization INCOS, est. 1970
- July 22: Comicon '73 (Waverley Hotel, London, England) — Comic Mart organizers Nick Landau and Rob Barrow salvage convention canceled at the last minute by Bram Stokes and John Mansfield and originally scheduled to take place over two days at the Regent Centre Hotel
- October 28–November 3: Salone Internazionale dei Comics (Lucca, Italy) a.k.a. "Lucca 9"

=== North America ===
- January 19–21: Infinity '73 (Commodore Hotel, New York City) — science fiction/comics convention
- January 25–26: Cosmicon II (York University Winters College, Toronto, Ontario, Canada)
- April 20–22: Berkeleycon 73, (Pauley Ballroom, ASUC Building, University of California, Berkeley) — first convention that really highlighted underground comix; guests included Spain Rodriguez, Shary Flenniken, Dennis Kitchen, Jaxon, Guy Colwell, Trina Robbins, Dave Sheridan, Patricia Moodian, George DiCaprio, Michelle Brand, and Bobby London. Bud Plant's retail business Comics & Comix acquires over 4,000 Golden Age comic books owned by Tom Reilly.
- May 18–20: Chicago Comic Con (Midland Hotel, Chicago, IL) — (not affiliated with Nostalgia '73, which later became the Chicago Comicon); produced by Mark Lully of Atlantis Bookstore; guests include Stan Lee, Jim Steranko, and Mike Hinge; admission $5 for all 3 days
- May 25–28 (Memorial Day weekend): Detroit Triple Fan Fair I, (Detroit Hilton, Detroit, MI) — guests include Jerry Bails
- June 21–24: Houstoncon '73 (Marriott Hotel, Houston, Texas) — c. 2,000 attendees; guests include Kirk Alyn, Frank Coghlan, Jr., William Benedict, William Witney, Dave Sharpe, Al Williamson, and Don Newton; convention notorious for a major van crash involving Robert Beerbohm, Bud Plant, and others as they were leaving the convention
- June 27–July 1: D-Con '73 (Sheraton Hotel, Dallas, Texas) — guests include Harlan Ellison, William Gaines, Burne Hogarth, Andrew J. Offutt, and Jerry Bails; tickets $7.50 at the door
- July 4–8: Comic Art Convention (Hotel Commodore, New York City) — guests include Dr. Fredric Wertham, John Putnam, Jerry DeFuccio, Paul Gulacy, Bob Brown, Marie Severin, Tony Isabella, Elliot S. Maggin, Julius Schwartz, Guy H. Lillian III, C. C. Beck, Dave Cockrum, Gil Kane, Rick Durell, Gray Morrow, Dwight Decker, and Russell Myers
- August: Metro Con (Washington, D.C. area) — organized and produced by Gary Groth and Warren Bernard; guests include Michael Kaluta, Jeff Jones, Dennis O'Neil, Bernie Wrightson, Walt Simonson, Howard Chaykin, and Archie Goodwin. Showing of the film 1932 horror film Freaks. Final edition of this convention.
- August 3–5: Nostalgia '73, 2nd Annual Chicago Comic and Nostalgia Convention (Pick-Congress Hotel, Chicago, Illinois) — produced by Nancy Warner
- August 16–19 — San Diego Comic-Con (Sheraton Hotel, Harbor Island, California) — 1,000+ attendees. Official guests: Neal Adams, D.C. Fontana, June Foray, Mike Friedrich, Carmine Infantino
- August 24–26: Cleveland Comic Convention (Sheraton Cleveland Hotel, Cleveland, Ohio) — produced by Vladimir Swyrinsky and sponsored by WMMS; guests include Val Mayerik, Dan Adkins, Paul Gulacy, Tony Isabella, and P. Craig Russell
- October: Buffalo Marvelous Con (Statler Hilton Hotel, Buffalo, NY) — guests include Gil Kane and Phil Seuling
- October 18–21: Detroit Triple Fan Fair II, (Detroit Hilton, Detroit, MI) — guests include Barry Windsor-Smith, Michael Kaluta, George A. Romero, and Russ Heath
- December 2: Oak Con I (Gold Room, Oakland University, Rochester Hills, MI) — produced by Steve Sundahl

== Awards ==
=== Comic Fan Art Awards ===
(Formerly the Goethe Awards) For comics published in 1973. Presented at the 1974 Comic Art Convention, held July 4–8, 1974, at the Commodore Hotel, New York City; and published in The Buyer's Guide to Comics Fandom #63 (Aug. 1, 1974).

- Favorite Pro Artist: Bernie Wrightson
- Favorite Pro Writer: Len Wein
- Favorite Pro Editor: Roy Thomas
- Favorite Pro Comic Book: Swamp Thing (DC)
- Favorite Comic-Book Story: "Night of the Bat," by Len Wein, Bernie Wrightson, and Joe Orlando in Swamp Thing #7 (DC)
- Favorite Comic-Book Character: Conan
- Favorite Fanzine: The Comic Reader (edited by Paul Levitz)
- Favorite Fan Writer: Don & Maggie Thompson
- Favorite Fan Artist: Don Newton
  - Howard Bender (third place)

=== Shazam Awards ===
Presented in 1974 for comics published in 1973:

- Best Continuing Feature: Swamp Thing (DC Comics)
- Best Individual Story: "Song of Red Sonja", by Roy Thomas and Barry Smith, Conan the Barbarian #24 (Marvel Comics)
- Best Individual Short Story (Dramatic): "The Himalayan Incident" (Manhunter), by Archie Goodwin and Walt Simonson, Detective Comics #437 (DC)
- Best Writer (Dramatic Division): Archie Goodwin
- Best Penciller (Dramatic Division): Berni Wrightson
- Best Inker (Dramatic Division): Dick Giordano
- Best Humor Story: "The Gourmet", Plop! #1 (DC)
- Best Writer (Humor Division) (tie):
  - Stu Schwartzberg
  - Steve Skeates
- Best Penciller (Humor Division): Marie Severin
- Best Inker (Humor Division): Ralph Reese
- Best Letterer: Gaspar Saladino
- Best Colorist: Glynis Wein
- Best Foreign Comic Series: Lieutenant Blueberry
- Outstanding New Talent (tie):
  - Walt Simonson
  - Jim Starlin
- Superior Achievement by an Individual: Richard Corben
- Hall of Fame: Carl Barks

== First issues by title ==
=== DC Comics ===
Black Magic: selected reprints of 1950 Prize Comics series.

Release: October /November Writer: Joe Simon. Artist: Jack Kirby.

Plop!

Release: September /October Editor: Joe Orlando.

Prez

Release: September. Writer: Joe Simon. Artist: Jerry Grandenetti.

Shazam!

Release: February. Artist: C.C. Beck. Editor: Julius Schwartz.

=== Marvel Comics ===
Crazy: precursor to Crazy Magazine

Release: January.

Crazy Magazine

Release: October. Editor: Marv Wolfman.

Dead of Night

Release: January.

Dracula Lives!

Release: by Curtis Magazines. Editor: Roy Thomas.

Ghost Rider vol. 2

Release: September. Writer: Gary Friedrich. Artist: Tom Sutton and Syd Shores.

Monster of Frankenstein

Release: January. Writer: Gary Friedrich. Artist: Mike Ploog.

Monsters Unleashed

Release: July by Curtis Magazines. Editor: Roy Thomas.

Spider-Man Comics Weekly

Release: February 10 by Marvel UK. Editor: Tony Isabella.

Tales of the Zombie

Release: July by Curtis Magazines. Editor: Roy Thomas.

Vampire Tales

Release: July by Curtis Magazines. Editor: Roy Thomas.

War is Hell

Release: January. Editor: Roy Thomas.

Worlds Unknown

Release: May. Editor: Stan Lee.

=== Independent titles ===
Bobo
Release by Semic Press. Writer and Artist: Lars Mortimer

Cutie Honey

Release: October 1 by Akita Shoten. Writer/Artist: Go Nagai.

E-Man

Release: October by Charlton Comics. Writer: Nicola Cuti. Artist: Joe Staton.

The Occult Files of Dr. Spektor

Release: May by Gold Key Comics. Writer: Don Glut. Artist: Jesse Santos.

== Initial appearances by character name ==
=== DC Comics ===
- Abigail Arcane, in Swamp Thing #3 (February -March)
- Anton Arcane, in Swamp Thing #01 (November)
- Black Orchid, in Adventure Comics #428 (July)
- Freedom Fighters, in Justice League of America #107 (October)
  - Uncle Sam, in Justice League of America #107 (October)
  - Phantom Lady, in Justice League of America #107 (October)
  - Ray, in Justice League of America #107 (October)
  - Human Bomb, in Justice League of America #107 (October)
  - Black Condor, in Justice League of America #107 (October)
- Hunter, in Superboy #199 (November)
- Klarion the Witch Boy, in The Demon #7 (March)
- Steve Lombard, in Superman #264 (June)
- Mister Miracle (Shilo Norman), in Mister Miracle #15 (August)
- Prez, in Prez #01 (September)
- Spook, in Detective Comics #434 (April)
- The Shadow, in Shadow #01 (November)
- Tyr, in Superboy and the Legion of Super-Heroes #197 (September)
- Wildfire, in Superboy and the Legion of Super-Heroes #195 (June)

=== Marvel Comics ===
- Angar the Screamer, in Daredevil #100 (June)
- Bi-Beast, in The Incredible Hulk #169 (November)
- Blade, in The Tomb of Dracula #10 (July)
- Lucas Brand, in The Tomb of Dracula #9 (June)
- Brother Voodoo, in Strange Tales #169 (September)
- Drax the Destroyer, in Iron Man #55 (February)
- Deacon Frost, in The Tomb of Dracula #13 (October)
- Gremlin, in The Incredible Hulk #163 (May)
- Quincy Harker, in The Tomb of Dracula #7 (March)
- Daimon Hellstrom, in Ghost Rider (vol. 2) #1 (September)
- Helmut Zemo, in Captain America #168 (December)
- Howard the Duck, in Adventure into Fear #19 (December)
- The Hydro-Men, in Sub-Mariner #61 (May)
- The Infra-Worlders, in The Incredible Hulk #164 (June)
- Solomon Kane, in Monsters Unleashed #1 (August)
- Erik Killmonger, in Jungle Action #6 (September)
- Killraven, in Amazing Adventures #18 (May)
- Kronos, in Iron Man #55 (February)
- A'lars, in Iron Man #55 (February)
- Moondragon, in Iron Man #54 (January)
- Nimrod, in Dracula Lives! #3 (October)
- Orb, in Marvel Team-Up #15 (November)
- Satana, in Vampire Tales #2 (October)
- Shang-Chi, in Special Marvel Edition #15 (December)
- Sui-San, in Captain Marvel #29 (November)
- Starfox, in Iron Man #55 (February)
- Thanos, in Iron Man #55 (February)
- Ultimus, in The Mighty Thor #209 (March)
- Uranos, in Captain Marvel #29 (November)
- Venomm, in Jungle Action #6 (September)
- Wendigo, in The Incredible Hulk #162 (April)
- Wundarr the Aquarian, in Adventure into Fear #17 (October)
- Baron Zemo II, in Captain America #168 (December)
- Zzzax, in The Incredible Hulk #166 (August)

=== Independent titles ===
- Black Jack, in Weekly Shōnen Champion (November 19)
- Rerun van Pelt, in Peanuts (March 26)
- Superlopez, by Juan Lopez Fernandez (November)
