= Neal Adams bibliography =

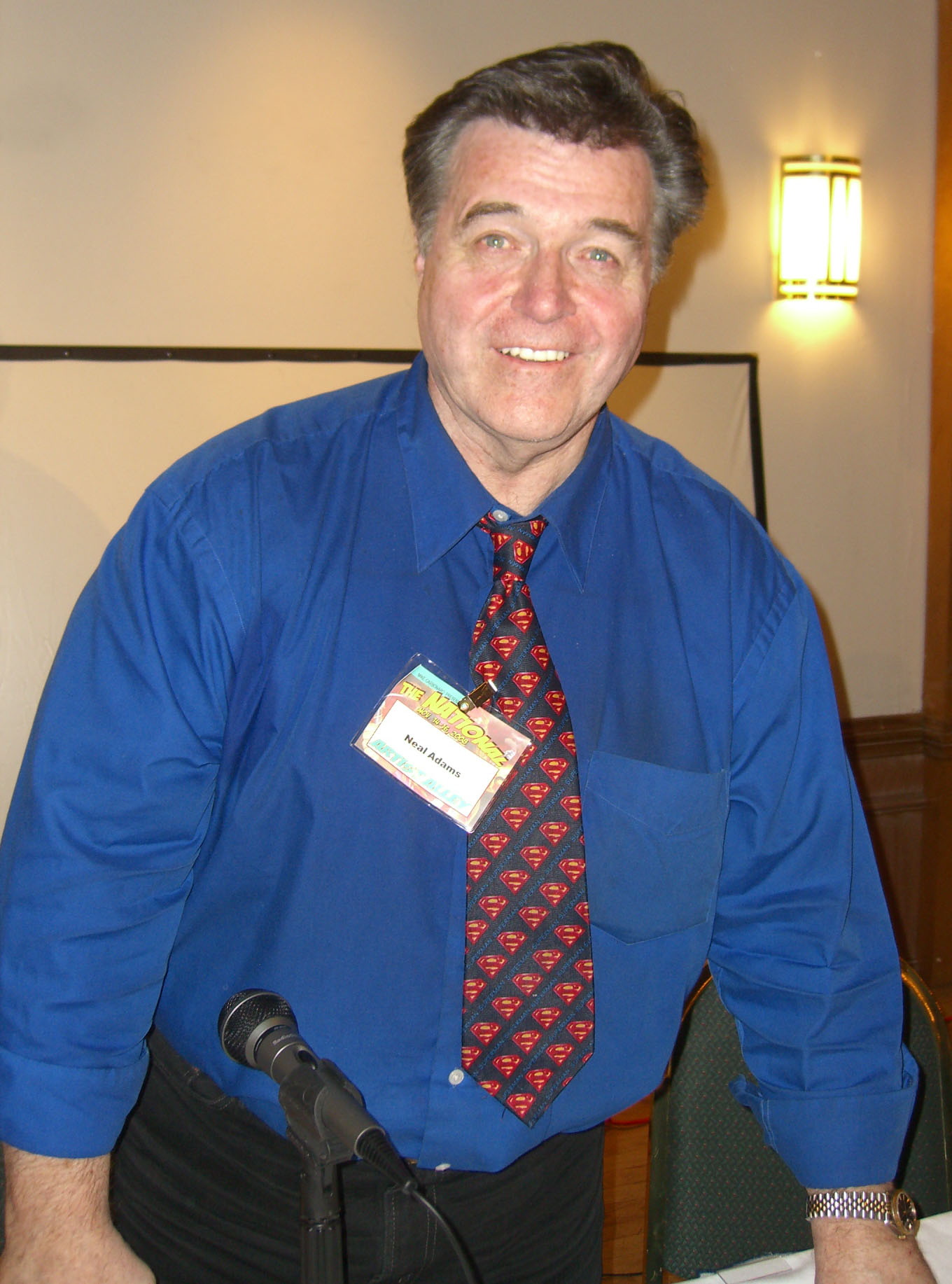
- Adams at the Big Apple Con, November 15, 2008
- Active period: 1962–2022

Publishers
- DC Comics: 1967–2022
- Marvel Comics: 1969–2022
- Continuity: 1984–1994

Neal Adams was a comic artist and creator who worked on a large number of comic books and characters, particularly for DC Comics and Marvel Comics, and even creating his own company, Continuity Comics.

== Bibliography ==
Comics work (pencil art, except where noted) includes:

=== Interior art ===
==== Continuity ====
- Armor #8 (among other artists) (1990)
- Captain Power and the Soldiers of the Future #1–2 (1988–89)
- Echo of Futurepast (Frankenstein) #1–5 (1984–85)
- Ms Mystic #1–2
- Revengers featuring Megalith #1–5 (1986–88)
- ToyBoy #1 (with Win Mortimer) (1986)
- Valeria the She-Bat #1, 5 (writer/art) (1993)

==== DC ====
- Action Comics (Human Target) #425 (1973), #1000 (5-page story) (2018)
- The Adventures of Bob Hope #106–109 (1967–68)
- The Adventures of Jerry Lewis #101–104 (1967)
- All-New Collectors' Edition (Superman vs. Muhammad Ali) #C-56 (1978)
- The Amazing World of DC Comics Special #1 (Superman story, (Note: Pencil layout story) 1976)
- Aquaman (Deadman backup stories) #50–52 (1970)
- Batman #219 (backup story); #232, 234, 237, 243–245, 251, 255 (1970–74)
- Batman Black and White, vol. 2, #1 (among other artists) (2013)
- Batman, vol. 3, Annual #1 (Batman/Harley Quinn, (Note: Based on the concept of Batman #219's backup story, The silent Night of the Batman) 2016)
- Batman Odyssey, miniseries, #1–6 (writer/art) (2010–11)
- Batman Odyssey, vol. 2, miniseries, #1–7 (writer/art) (2011–12)
- Batman vs Ra's al Ghul, miniseries, #1–6 (2019–21)
- The Brave and the Bold #79–86, 93 (1968–71); #102 (along with Jim Aparo) (1972)
- Challengers of the Unknown #74 (along with George Tuska) (1970)
- Deadman, miniseries, #1–6 (writer/ art) (2017–2018)
- Detective Comics (Elongated Man backup story) #369; (Batman) #395, 397, 400, 402, 404, 407, 408, 410 (1967–71)
- Detective Comics, vol. 2, #27 (among other artists, 2014)
- The Flash (Green Lantern/Green Arrow backup stories) #217–219, 226 (1972–74)
- Green Lantern #76–87, 89 (1970–72)
- Hot Wheels #6 (1970)
- Harley's Little Black Book #5 (Harley Quinn/Superman, (Note: Recreating the Superman vs. Muhammad Ali fight, with Harley taking Ali's place) 2016)
- House of Mystery, vol. 1, #178–179, 186, 228 (1969–75)
- House of Mystery, vol. 2, #13 (2009)
- Justice for All includes Children #1–2, 6–7 (public service pages, 1976)
- Justice League of America #94 (four pages, 1971)
- The Kamandi Challenge #2 (2017)
- Our Army at War #182–183, 186, 240 (1967–72)
- Phantom Stranger, vol. 2, #4 (1969)
- Spectre #2–5 (1968)
- Star Spangled War Stories #134, 144 (1967–69)
- Strange Adventures (Deadman) #206–211, 214 (art); #212–213, 215–216 (writer/art) (1967–69)
- Superman ("Private Life of Clark Kent") #254 (1972)
- Superman: The Coming of the Supermen, miniseries, #1–6 (writer/art) (2016)
- Teen Titans #20–22 (1969)
- Weird War Tales #8 (1972)
- Weird Western Tales (El Diablo) #12–13, 15 (1972)
- Witching Hour #8 (1970)
- World's Finest Comics (Superman/Batman) #175–176 (1968)

==== Marvel ====
- Astonishing Tales #12 (1972)
- Amazing Adventures, vol. 2 (Inhumans) #5–8 (1971), #18 (along with Howard Chaykin) (1973)
- Avengers #93–96 (1971–72)
- Bizarre Adventures #28 (1981)
- Conan The Barbarian #37 (1974)
- Crazy Magazine #2 (1974)
- The Deadly Hands of Kung Fu #1, #3-4 (1974)
- Dracula Lives #2 (1973)
- Epic Illustrated #7 (1981)
- Fantastic Four: Antithesis #1–4 (2020)
- First X-Men, miniseries, #1–5 (2012–13)
- Kull and the Barbarians #2 (1975) (as inker)
- Monsters Unleashed #3 (1973)
- New Avengers, vol. 2, #16.1 (2011)
- Savage Sword of Conan #1, #14 (1976)
- Savage Tales #4 (along with Gil Kane) (1974)
- Thor #180–181 (1970)
- Tower of Shadows #2 (1969)
- X-Men #56–63, 65 (1969–70)
- Unknown Worlds of Science Fiction #1 (1975)
- X-Men Giant-Size #3 (2005)
- Young Avengers Special #1 (among other artists) (2006)

==== Other publishers ====
- Creepy #14–16, 32, 75 (Warren, 1967–75)
- Dark Horse Presents, vol. 2, ("Blood" feature) #1–3, 5–8, 11, 29 (Dark Horse, 2011–13)
- Eerie #9–10 (Warren, 1967)
- Emergency! JULY 1976
- Harpoon JAN 1973
- International Insanity, SEPT 1976
- Knighthawk #2–6 (Acclaim)
- National Lampoon 1971 November Dragula, 1972 January, August, December Son-O-God, October The Ventures of Zimmerman, 1974 May Son-O-God meets Zimmerman, Oct Dec Son-O-God, 1975 July Airport 69 (3D), September Adenoidal, 1976 January A Few Bold Lads, October Tod Tunes, 1978 February Sgt. Nick Penis, October The Deal
- Playboy June 1957, page 57
- The Six Million Dollar Man July 1976
- Vampirella #1 (Warren, 1969), #10
- Batman and Robin: Stacked Cards, book-and-record set #PR27 (Peter Pan, 1975) (Note: Characters under license from DC Comics.)
- Batman and Robin: Robin meets Man-Bat, book-and-record set #PR30 (Peter Pan, 1976)

=== Cover art ===
==== DC ====
- A Heroic Journey #1 (2016)
- Action Comics 356, 358–359, 361–364, 366–367, 370–374, 377–379, 398–400, 402, 404–405, 419, 466, 468, 473, 485 (1967–78)
- Action Comics, vol. 2, #49 (variant, 2016)
- Adventure Comics #365–369, 371–373, 375 (1968)
- All-Star Batman and Robin #8–9 (variant) (2008)
- All-Star Superman #1 (variant) (2006)
- Batman #200, 203, 210, 217–218, 220–227, 229–231, 235–236, 238–241 (1968–72), Annual #14 (1990)
- Batman, vol. 2, #49 (variant, 2016)
- Batman, vol. 3, #28 (variant, 2017)
- Batman/Teenage Mutant Ninja Turtles #1 (variant, 2016)
- Before Watchmen: Dr. Manhattan #3 (variant, 2012)
- Batman/Superman #29 (variant, 2016)
- Brave and the Bold #76 (1968)
- Challengers of the Unknown #67–68, 70, 72 (1969–70)
- Cyborg #8 (variant, 2016)
- The Dark Knight III: The Master Race #1 (2016)
- DC 100 Page Super Spectacular #6, 13
- DC Special #3–4, 6, 11 (1969–71), #29 (1977)
- DC Special Blue Ribbon Digest #16 (1981)
- DC Special Series #1 (1977)
- Deadman #1–7 (reprints of Strange Adventures #206–216) (1985)
- Deathstroke, vol. 2, #15 (variant, 2016)
- Detective Comics #372, 385, 389, 391–392, 394, 396, 398–399, 401, 403, 405–406, 409, 411–422, 439 (1968–74)
- Detective Comics, vol. 2, #49 (variant, 2016)
- First Wave (Doc Savage, The Spirit, Batman) #1 (variant, 2010)
- The Flash #194–195, 203–204, 206–208, 213, 215 (1970–72), #246 (1977)
- The Flash, vol. 4, #49 (variant, 2016)
- Forbidden Tales of Dark Mansion #9 (1973)
- From Beyond the Unknown #6 (1970)
- G.I. Combat #168, 201–202 (1974–77)
- Grayson #17 (variant, 2016)
- Green Arrow, vol. 5, #44, 49 (variant, 2015–16)
- Green Arrow, vol. 6, #1–17 (variant, 2016–17)
- Green Lantern #63 (1968)
- Green Lantern, vol. 5, #49 (variant, 2016)
- Green Lantern 80th. Anniversary 100-Page #1 (variant, 2020)
- Green Lantern/Green Arrow #1–7 (reprints of Green Lantern #76–89) (1983–84)
- Heart Throbs #120 (1969)
- Heroes against Hunger, one-shot (1986)
- Hot Wheels #2–3 (1970)
- House of Mystery #175–192, 197, 199 (1968–72); #251–254 (1977)
- House of Secrets #81–82, 84–88, 90–91 (1969–71)
- The Joker, vol. 2, #1–4, 6 (variants, 2021)
- Justice League of America #66–67, 70, 74, 79, 82, 86–89, 91, 92, 94–98 (1968–72); #138–139 (1977)
- Limited Collectors' Edition #C-25, C-51, C-52, C-59 (1974–78)
- Martian Manhunter #9 (variant, 2016)
- Mystery in Space, vol. 2, #1 (variant, 2006)
- Our Fighting Forces #147 (1974)
- Phantom Stranger, vol. 2, #3–19 (1969–72)
- Red Hood/Arsenal #9 (variant, 2016)
- Robin, Son of Batman #9 (variant, 2016)
- Saga of Ra's Al Ghul, reprint miniseries, #4 (1988)
- Salvation Run #7 (variant, 2008)
- Scooby Apocalypse #1 (variant, 2016)
- Secret Hearts #134 (1969)
- Showcase (Phantom Stranger) #80 (1969)
- Sinestro #20 (variant, 2016)
- Starfire #9 (variant, 2016)
- Superboy #143, 145–146, 148–153, 155, 157–161, 163–164, 166–168, 172–173, 175–176, 178 (1967–71)
- Superman #204–208, 210, 214–215, 231, 233–237, 240–243, 250–252, 263 (1968–73); #307–308, 317 (1977)
- Superman, vol. 3, #49 (variant, 2016)
- The Superman Family #183–185 (1977)
- Superman/Wonder Woman #26 (variant, 2016)
- Superman: Lois & Clark #5 (variant, 2016)
- Superman's Girl Friend, Lois Lane #79, 81–88, 90–91 (1967–69)
- Superman's Pal Jimmy Olsen #109–112, 115, 118, 134–136, 147–148 (full art); #137–138, 141–142, 144 (inks over Jack Kirby pencils) (1968–72)
- Tales of the Unexpected (then changes title to Unexpected) #104, 110, 112–115, 118, 121, 124 (1967–71)
- Tales of the Unexpected, miniseries, #1 (variant) (2006)
- Teen Titans, vol. 5, #17 (variant, 2016)
- Telos #5 (variant, 2016)
- Titans Hunt #5 (variant, 2016)
- Tomahawk #116–119, 121, 123–130 (1968–70)
- We Are Robin #9 (variant, 2016)
- Wonder Woman, vol. 4, #49 (variant, 2016)
- Wonder Woman/Conan, miniseries, #5 (variant) (DC/Dark Horse, 2018)
- World's Finest Comics #174, 178–180, 183, 199–205, 208–211; #244–246, 258 (full art); #182, 185–186 (inks over Curt Swan pencils) (1968–79)

==== Marvel ====
- All-New Captain America #3 (variant, 2015)
- Avengers #92 (1971)
- Avengers World #6 (2014)
- Avengers Finale (2005)
- Civil War II #1 (variant, 2016)
- Captain Marvel, vol. 3, #15 (2003)
- Conan: Serpent War, miniseries, #1 (variant, 2020)
- Deadly Hands of Kung Fu #1–4, 11–12, 14, 17 (painted covers, 1974–75)
- Defenders, vol. 4, #1 (variant, 2017)
- Doctor Strange, vol. 3, #1 (2015)
- Dracula Lives #3 (painted cover, 1975)
- Epic Illustrated #6 (1981)
- Ghost Rider, vol. 5, #1 (variant, 2011)
- The Incredible Hulk, vol. 4, #1 (variant, 2011)
- Incredible Hulks #635 (variant, 2011)
- Invincible Iron Man, vol. 2, #6 (variant, 2016)
- Legion of Monsters #1 (painted cover, 1975)
- Marvel Feature #1 (1971)
- Monsters Unleashed #3 (painted cover, 1973)
- The Punisher, vol. 7, #1 (variant, 2011)
- Savage Sword of Conan #2 (painted cover, 1974)
- Savage Tales #4–6 (painted covers, 1974)
- Secret Wars #1 (variant, 2015)
- Tomb of Dracula #1 (1972), #7 (1973)
- Ultimate Comics: Hawkeye #1 (variant, 2011)
- Uncanny Avengers #1 (variant, 2012)

==== Other publishers ====
- Back Issue! #10, 18, 45 (TwoMorrows, 2005–10)
- Comic Book Artist #1 (TwoMorrows, 1998)
- The Comics Journal #73
- Iron Jaw #1–2 (Atlas/Seaboard, 1975)
- Mighty Mouse #1 (variant), #2 (Dynamite, 2017)
- Planet of Vampires #1–2 (Atlas/Seaboard, 1975)
- Reconcilers (Viking Warrior Press, 2010)
- Red Sonja #4 (variant) (Dynamite, 2006)
- The Shadow, vol. 2, #1 (variant) (Dynamite, 2017)
- Six Million Dollar Man #2 (painted cover) (Charlton, 1976)
- Star Trek/Green Lantern #1 (variant) (IDW, 2015)
- Tales of the Green Hornet, vol. 2, #1 (Now, 1992)
- Thrilling Adventure Stories #2 (Atlas/Seaboard, 1975)
- WildC.A.T.s/X-Men: The Silver Age (variant) (Image/Marvel, 1997)
- Write Now! #9 (TwoMorrows, 2005)
- Always Ontime: Chaos City (Panopolis Comics, 2021)

=== Books and compilations ===
(These books feature a new cover by Adams):

- Art of Neal Adams 1 (1975)
- Art of Neal Adams 2 (1977)
- Avengers: The Kree-Skrull War, 208 pages TPB (2000) ISBN 0-7851-0745-2
- Batman Illustrated by Neal Adams Vol. 1, 240 pages HC (2003) ISBN 1-4012-0041-9
- Batman Illustrated by Neal Adams Vol. 2, 236 pages HC (2004) ISBN 1-4012-0269-1
- Batman Illustrated by Neal Adams Vol. 3, 280 pages HC (2006) ISBN 1-4012-0407-4
- DC Universe Illustrated by Neal Adams Vol. 1, 192 pages HC (2008)
- The Deadman Collection, 342 pages HC (2001) (Note: Adams re-inked over his own pencils for the story "An Eye for an Eye" (originally inked by George Roussos) published in Strange Adventures #206) ISBN 1-56389-849-7
- The Greatest Team-Up Stories Ever Told (softcover edition) (1990)
- The Green Lantern/Green Arrow Collection HC (2000) ISBN 1-56389-639-7
- Hard-Traveling Heroes: The Green Lantern/Green Arrow Collection Volume One TPB (1992) ISBN 1-56389-038-0
- The Green Lantern/Green Arrow Collection Volume Two: More Hard-Traveling Heroes TPB (1993) ISBN 1-56389-086-0
- Green Lantern/Green Arrow Volume One, 176 pages TPB (2004) ISBN 1-4012-0224-1
- Green Lantern/Green Arrow Volume Two, 200 pages TPB (2004) ISBN 1-4012-0230-6
- The Neal Adams Index (1974) (Doug Murray & Frank Verzyl, publishers)
- Neal Adams Monsters, HC (2004)
- Neal Adams Treasury 1, 60 pages (1976)
- Neal Adams Treasury 2, 56 pages (1979)
- Sketch Book (1999)
- X-Men Visionaries: Neal Adams, 208 pages TPB (2000) ISBN 0-7851-0198-5

=== Other ===
- DC Super Calendar 1976 (complete calendar); 1977–78 (cover)
- The Far-Gate Experience (poster, characters of TV series Farscape and Stargate SG-1), Sci Fi Channel
