= Crusty Bunkers =

Pseudonym of a group of US comic book inkers

Crusty Bunker
- Area: Inkers
- Collaborators: Neal Adams; Dick Giordano

Crusty Bunker, or the Crusty Bunkers, was the collective pseudonym of a group of comic book inkers clustered around Neal Adams' and Dick Giordano's New York City-based art and design agency Continuity Studios from 1972 to 1977. The group was also occasionally credited as Ilya Hunch, Chuck Bunker, or The Goon Squad. Many Crusty Bunkers team members went on to successful individual careers in the comics industry.

Around 2020, Adams opened a Burbank, California, comics retailer called Neal Adams Crusty Bunkers Comics and Toys. The store is managed by Adams' son Joel Adams. On occasion, Neal Adams would create and sell items such as variant covers, called "Crusty Bunker" editions, which were offered exclusively at the store or from Adams himself. The store closed permanently some time between 2024 and 2025.

== History ==
According to former member Alan Weiss, the name "Crusty Bunker" was first coined by Adams in relation to his children: "It was like calling someone a name that wasn't really dirty. ... It didn't really mean anything, it just sounded good".

There were over 60 artists who at one time or another were Crusty Bunker members. The core group consisted of artists who rented space at Continuity or worked up front in the advertising studio itself. Continuity would get the assignment, someone with experience (usually Adams or Giordano) would ink the faces and main figures, then pass it around for everyone to work on it, until the whole thing was completed. Comic book titles that the collective worked on included Marvel's Red Sonja and Marvel Premiere, the Marvel black-and-white magazine titles Dracula Lives!, Tales of the Zombie, and Monsters Unleashed; and DC's Sword of Sorcery.

Former Crusty Bunker Larry Hama recounted: "If a job was incredibly late, then the Crusty Bunkers would gather together half-a-dozen to a dozen inkers and... turn out a whole book in a day or two, all under the supervision of Neal [Adams]. It was a whirl. Guys would be passing pages back and forth. Guys would be standing over boards filling in blacks upside down while somebody was rendering a face at the bottom of the page".

This period was one of transition in the comics industry, as DC Comics had been toppled from comics dominance by Marvel Comics. In an attempt to revitalize its brand, DC made a concerted effort to entice young artists, including from this talent pool. As many of the Crusty Bunkers began getting regular comics work, they discontinued working in the group's collaborative fashion. The collective was effectively disbanded in 1977, although Adams resurrected the name for some of the comics put out by his own publishing company, Continuity Comics, from 1985 to 1993.

== Art style ==
Although directed (and often worked on directly) by Adams, the Crusty Bunkers inking style was not a clone of Adams' individual work. Their early published work showed a herky-jerky, jumble of styles that revealed the work of multiple hands. Within about a year, however (in response to the demand from publishers for a homogenous look), the Crusty Bunkers had developed a true "house style", with only hints of the individual styles that the respective artists later became known for. This house style was more rough-hewn than similar work by Adams.

== Members included ==
- Neal Adams – principal
- Dick Giordano – principal
- Jack Abel
- Vicente Alcazar
- Sal Amendola
- Steven Austin
- Terry Austin
- Joe Barney
- Rick Basile
- Pat Bastienne
- Pat Broderick
- Joe Brozowski (Note: Spelling in Who's Who of American Comic Books) / Brosowski
- Frank Brunner
- Rick Bryant
- Rich Buckler
- Howard Chaykin
- Frank Cirocco
- Dave Cockrum
- Denys Cowan
- Joe D'Esposito
- Ed Davis
- Karin Dougherty (Note: Source notes: "Dougherty, Karin [spelling?]")
- Steve Englehart
- John Fuller
- Dan Green
- Darrell Goza
- Larry Hama
- Steve Harper
- Russ Heath
- Klaus Janson
- Jeffrey Catherine Jones
- Paul Kirchner
- Alan Kupperberg
- Carl Lundgren
- Esteban Maroto
- Gary Martin
- Bob McLeod
- Al Milgrom
- Steve Mitchell
- Yong Montano
- Tim Moriarty
- Gray Morrow
- Michael Netzer (Nasser)
- Bruce Patterson
- Carl Potts
- Ralph Reese
- Mark Rice
- Marshall Rogers
- Josef Rubinstein
- James Sherman
- Mary Skrenes (Note: Included in source, which notes her as writer rather than artist.)
- Bob Smith
- Jim Starlin
- Greg Theakston
- Trevor Von Eeden
- Alan Weiss
- Bob Wiacek
- Gary Winnick
- Berni Wrightson

== Bibliography ==
Source unless otherwise noted:

=== 1970s incarnation ===
==== Atlas/Seaboard ====
- Wulf the Barbarian #2 (1975)

==== Charlton ====
- Emergency! (1976)
- Six Million Dollar Man (1976)

==== DC ====
- Mr. Miracle (1977)
- Sword of Sorcery #1–2 (1973)
- Weird Worlds #2–3 (1972–73), credited as "C. Bunker"

==== Marvel ====
- Conan the Barbarian #44–45, Annual #3 (1974–77)
- Crazy Magazine #2 (1974)
- Deadly Hands of Kung-Fu Special Album #1 (1974)
- Doctor Strange #4 (1974) – uncredited
- Dracula Lives #3, 10, Annual #1 (Curtis/Marvel, 1973–1975)
- Haunt of Horror #4 (1974)
- Iron Man #91 (1976)
- Ka-Zar (1974–75)
- Marvel Premiere #10, 12–13 (1973–74)
- Marvel Preview #1 (1975)
- Marvel Treasury Edition #6 (1975)
- Monsters Unleashed #3, Annual #1 (1973–75)
- Power Man #31 (1976)
- Savage Sword of Conan #2–3 (1974)
- Savage Tales #7, 10 (1974–75)

=== 1980s and 1990s ===
==== Continuity ====
- Armor #1 (1985)
- The Basics (1985)
- Hybrids: The Origin #4–5 (1993)
- Ms. Mystic #5 (1990)
- Ms. Mystic (vol. 2) #1, 3 (1993)
- Revengers Featuring Armor and Silver Streak #1 (1985)
- Urth 4 (1989–1993)

== See also ==
- Harry "A" Chesler
- Eisner & Iger
- Funnies Inc.
