= Menace (Atlas Comics) =

- Menace No. 5 (July 1953). Cover art by Bill Everett.

Publication information
- Publisher: Atlas Comics
- Format: Ongoing series
- Genre: Crime, horror
- Publication date: March 1953 – May 1954
- No. of issues: 11

Menace was a 1953 to 1954 American crime/horror anthology comic book series published by Atlas Comics, the 1950s precursor of Marvel Comics. It is best known for the first appearance of the supernatural Marvel character the Zombie, in a standalone story that became the basis for the 1970s black-and-white comics magazine Tales of the Zombie. As well, a standalone story in the final issue introduced a robot character that was revived decades later as the Human-Robot, a.k.a. M-11, the Human-Robot.

The 11-issue series (March 1953 – May 1954) included art by such 1940s Golden Age of Comic Books creators as Bill Everett and George Tuska, and such future industry stars as Gene Colan, Russ Heath, Joe Maneely, John Romita Sr., and Joe Sinnott. As well, the first eight issues were written completely by Atlas editor-in-chief Stan Lee, the future architect of Marvel Comics' rise as a pop-cultural phenomenon.

== Publication history ==
Menace, from publisher Martin Goodman's Atlas Comics, the 1950s forerunner of Marvel Comics, debuted in 1953 during a cycle of popularity for publisher EC Comics horror comics (Tales from the Crypt et al.). It joined such existing Atlas horror/fantasy series as Adventures into Terror and Strange Tales. Atlas editor-in-chief Stan Lee sought to distinguish the title by attempting to replicate EC's specific process, as Atlas historian Michal J. Vassallo describes:

The influence of [publisher] Bill Gaines' EC line had by now become enormous. Stan was quite aware of what was going on in the industry, and what his competition was going. EC, under Gaines and artist/editor Al Feldstein, was arguably the industry leader in terms of unsurpassed quality both editorially and creatively. EC used [its] small cadre of artists to extreme advantage, tailoring unique artistic styles to specific story settings and plots. While Stan may not have been quite so particular, he was certainly willing to try to give EC a run for its money. He would take over an entire book and do it all himself, like Feldstein did, with his small group of top-line artists.

Menace ran 11 issues, cover-dated from March 1953 to May 1954. It was published monthly through issue No. 8, then after a three-month hiatus returned for its final three, bimonthly issues. Lee wrote each issue's four comic stories through No. 7, and at least two more stories through the end of the title's run.

Issue No. 12 was in production at the time of cancellation, scheduled for a July 1954 cover date. The contents were held as inventory and soon afterwards published in the Atlas title Astonishing No. 35 (Oct. 1954).

Menace is considered an example of "pre-Code horror", referring to horror comics published before the strictures of the industry's self-censoring Comics Code Authority, in which comics would bear the postage-stamp-sized Comics Code seal. The series' covers, however, each sport a star reading "Conforms to the Comics Code", with a small rectangular box above that reading "Authorized A.C.M.P." This represents the essentially unenforced precursor sponsored by the trade group the Association of Comics Magazine Publishers.

== Creative personnel ==
The series' primary artist was Bill Everett, who in 1939 had created the aquatic antihero the Sub-Mariner and who was now an Atlas mainstay. For issues #1–6, he drew the covers and one story each, as well as drawing a story for No. 9 and the cover of No. 10. The Lee/Everett story "Zombie" in issue No. 5 (July 1953) introduced the Zombie, Simon Garth, in a seven-page, standalone story of a zombie outside New Orleans, Louisiana, and the ironic comeuppance visited upon his cruel master. The character was revived two decades later as the star of the black-and-white horror-comics magazine Tales of the Zombie (Aug. 1973 – June 1974), published by the Marvel Comics imprint Curtis Magazines. The character has continued to make appearances in Marvel comic books into the 2000s.

Another character introduced in a standalone story that was revived decades later as a continuing character was an unnamed robot in the five-page story "I, the Robot", by an unknown writer and artist John Romita Sr., in issue No. 11 (May 1954). Rechristened the Human-Robot, the character appeared in a non-canonical, alternate-universe story in What If? No. 9 (June 1978), as part of a 1950s version of the later-created Marvel superhero team the Avengers. The character next appeared in mainstream Marvel Universe continuity in the six-issue miniseries Agents of Atlas (Oct. 2006 – March 2007) and the subsequent ongoing series Agents of Atlas vol. 2 (April 2009-on). Now dubbed M-11, the Human-Robot, it served as a member of a team of artificially or naturally long-lived 1950s superhumans gathered as the globetrotting adventurers the Agents of Atlas.

Other series artists included George Tuska and other 1940s Golden Age of Comic Books veterans such as single-story contributors Fred Kida, Sheldon Moldoff, Bob Powell, and Syd Shores. Industry newcomers and future stars included Gene Colan, Russ Heath, Joe Maneely, John Romita Sr., and Joe Sinnott. Among other artist contributors were Tony DiPreta, Al Eadeh, John Forte, Jack Katz, Ed Winiarski, Seymour Moskowitz, Paul Reinman, Werner Roth, and Robert Q. Sale. The covers of issues #7–8 are tentatively credited to Golden Age great Carl Burgos. Two standard databases credit the final issue's unsigned cover to artist Harry Anderson.

== Collected editions ==
- The complete 11 issue series has been collected in Marvel Masterworks: Atlas Era – Menace
- "Zombie!" from Menace No. 5 was included in the Marvel Horror Omnibus
- "I, the Robot" from Menace #11 has been included in various Agents of Atlas collections
