= Tales of the Zombie =

- Tales of the Zombie #1 (Aug. 1973), art by Boris Vallejo

Publication information
- Publisher: Marvel Comics
- Schedule: Quarterly
- Format: Ongoing series
- Genre: Horror
- Publication date: August 1973 – March 1975
- No. of issues: 10 plus 1 Super Annual
- Main character(s): Simon Garth; Brother Voodoo

Creative team
- Written by: Steve Gerber, Tony Isabella, Doug Moench, Carl Wessler, Chris Claremont
- Artist(s): Pablo Marcos, Alfredo Alcala, Ernie Chan, Win Mortimer, Tony DiPreta, Crusty Bunkers
- Penciller(s): Syd Shores, Dick Ayers, John Buscema, Virgilio Redondo, Yong Montano, Ron Wilson, Rich Buckler
- Inker(s): Tom Palmer, Pablo Marcos, Alfredo Alcala
- Editor(s): Roy Thomas (issues #1–10); Marv Wolfman (#3–10); Tony Isabella (#7 and 8); David Anthony Kraft (#9 and 10); Don McGregor (#9 and 10); John Warner (#10)

Collected editions
- Tales of the Zombie: ISBN 0-7851-1916-7

Tales of the Zombie was an American black-and-white horror comics magazine published by Magazine Management, a corporate sibling of Marvel Comics. The series ran 10 issues and one Super Annual from 1973 to 1975, many featuring stories of the Zombie (Simon Garth) by writer Steve Gerber and artist Pablo Marcos.

A magazine rather than a comic book, it did not fall under the purview of the comics industry's self-censorship Comics Code Authority, allowing the title to feature stronger content — such as moderate profanity, partial nudity, and more graphic violence — than the color comics of the time.

== Publication history ==
Copyrighted as simply Zombie and commonly known by its trademarked cover title, Tales of the Zombie, the magazine ran 10 issues cover dated 1973 - March 1975. With sister titles including Dracula Lives!, Monsters Unleashed! and Vampire Tales, it was published by Marvel Comics' parent company, Magazine Management, and related corporations, under the brand emblem Marvel Monster Group.

To star in the new title, Marvel's then-editor-in-chief Roy Thomas plucked Simon Garth, a character from a standalone 1950s horror tale created by Stan Lee and Bill Everett, introduced in Marvel predecessor Atlas Comics' Menace #5 (July 1953). This was a story published prior to the comics industry's self-censorship Comics Code Authority which, among other strictures, forbade zombies. This seven-page story was reprinted in Tales of the Zombie #1 (with the art slightly altered to give Simon Garth shoulder-length rather than short hair) as the continuation of a new, 12-page prequel story co-scripted by Thomas and Steve Gerber and drawn by John Buscema and Tom Palmer.

Following the premiere, all the Zombie stories were by Gerber and artist Pablo Marcos (one of these in collaboration with writer Doug Moench and artist Alfredo Alcala). The original series' finale, set at Garth's daughter's wedding in issue #9, was a three-chapter story written by Tony Isabella (chapter 2 with co-scripter Chris Claremont), drawn by pencilers Virgilio Redondo, Yong Montano, and Ron Wilson, respectively, and inker by Alcala (chapters 1-2) and Marcos (chapter 3). Simon Garth was laid to peaceful rest in Tales of the Zombie #9; the following, final issue contained a Brother Voodoo story and three anthological tales (Brother Voodoo also appeared in a back-up feature in issue #6).

In addition to reprinting the original 1950s Simon Garth story, the magazine reprinted other pre-Comics Code stories, including work by artists Win Mortimer and Tony DiPreta. Painted covers to the series were done by artists including Boris Vallejo and Earl Norem.

An annual publication formally titled Tales of the Zombie Super Annual was published in 1975, reprinting stories from the magazine.

=== Collections ===
All 10 issues of Tales of the Zombie and the Super Annual were collected in an Essential Marvel edition in 2006.
