= List of comics magazines published by Magazine Management in the 1970s =

Magazine Management
- Parent company: Magazine Management
- Founded: 1971
- Defunct: c. 1981
- Country of origin: United States
- Headquarters location: New York City, New York
- Key people: Archie Goodwin, Don McGregor, Doug Moench, Gerry Conway, Marv Wolfman, Roy Thomas, Steve Gerber
- Publication types: Black-and-white comics magazines
- Fiction genres: Horror, fantasy, martial arts
- Imprints: Marvel Monster Group, Marvel Magazine Group

Magazine Management, the magazine and comic-book publishing parent of Marvel Comics at the time, released a number of magazine-format comics in the 1970s, primarily from 1973 to 1977, in the market dominated by Warren Publishing. The line of mostly black-and-white anthology magazines predominantly featured horror, sword and sorcery, and science fiction. The magazines did not carry the Marvel name, but were produced by Marvel staffers and freelancers, and featured characters regularly found in Marvel comic books, as well as some creator-owned material. In addition to the many horror titles, magazines in this group included Savage Sword of Conan, The Deadly Hands of Kung Fu, Marvel Preview, and Planet of the Apes.

== Overview ==
The magazine format did not fall under the purview of the comics industry's self-censorship Comics Code Authority, allowing the titles to feature stronger content than mainstream color comic books, such as moderate profanity, partial nudity, and more graphic violence. In addition to original content, many issues included reprinted material, including a number of horror stories from Marvel's 1950s predecessor Atlas Comics that originally were published before the 1954 introduction of the Comics Code.

Lead editors for the magazine group were Roy Thomas, Marv Wolfman, and later Archie Goodwin and John Warner. Jenny Blake Isabella, Don McGregor, and David Anthony Kraft also spent stints editing magazine titles.

Writer Doug Moench contributed heavily to the magazines, including to the entire runs of Planet of the Apes, Rampaging Hulk, and Doc Savage, while also writing for virtually every other title in the line. The magazines featured fully painted covers by illustrators including Earl Norem, Bob Larkin, Ken Barr, Luis Dominguez, Neal Adams, Frank Brunner, Boris Vallejo, and Joe Jusko. Marvel production manager Sol Brodsky, who in 1970 had helped launch the short-lived Skywald Publications line of black-and-white horror magazines before returning to Marvel, served as production manager here as well.

=== Curtis brand ===
Initially, the only company brand on the magazines was the "three C's" Curtis Circulation Company logo (Curtis being Marvel's distributor and an affiliated company). The Marvel Comics brand and logo did not always appear on the cover or in the indicia; the only obvious relation to Marvel being the publisher's name, Magazine Management, a name that the four-color comics stopped using in 1973 but was retained for the black-and-white magazines. Nonetheless, Marvel characters appeared regularly in the magazine line, and many of the magazine titles were featured in the four-color comics' house advertisements. The Curtis imprint was reduced to "CC" in 1975.

== Publication history ==
=== Antecedents ===
The magazine line was Marvel's second attempt at entering the black-and-white comics magazines market: in 1968, Marvel had experimented with the format with the two-issue superhero entry The Spectacular Spider-Man and the one-shot The Adventures of Pussycat.

=== Savage Tales ===
In 1971, attempting to compete in a market dominated by Warren Publishing and smaller publishers like Eerie Publications and Skywald Publications, the company launched Savage Tales, which debuted in the spring — and was immediately canceled. Roy Thomas, a Marvel writer-editor who became the company's editor-in-chief in 1972, recalled that:

...there were several things that led to Savage Tales being canceled after that first issue. [Publisher] Martin Goodman had never really wanted to do a non-Code comic, probably because he didn't want any trouble with the [Comics Magazine Association of America] over it. Nor did he really want to get into magazine-format comics; and [Marvel editor-in-chief] Stan [Lee] really did. So Goodman looked for an excuse to cancel it.

=== 1972 launch, Marvel Monster Group ===
Although Goodman had sold Magazine Management in 1968, he remained as the publisher. But Goodman left in 1972, the same year the company's new owners revived the magazine line. In addition to reviving Savage Tales, now with a new lineup of content, Magazine Management released the new titles Dracula Lives!, Vampire Tales, and Monsters Unleashed, as well as Monster Madness, a humorous fumetti magazine (all published under the Marvel Monster Group brand); Tales of the Zombie; the prose digest Haunt of Horror; and the satirical-comics magazine Crazy.

Editor Wolfman said, "We used to farm the books out to Harry Chester Studios [sic] and whatever they pasted up, they pasted up. I formed the first production staff, hired the first layout people, paste-up people."

1974 saw the debut of The Deadly Hands of Kung Fu, Monsters of the Movies, Planet of the Apes, Savage Sword of Conan, a revised Haunt of Horror, and Marvel's short-lived entree into underground comix, Comix Book.

Initially, the magazines' page-counts varied among 68, 76, and 84 pages.

=== Crushing Skywald ===
By late 1974, Magazine Management was flooding the black-and-white comics magazine market with 11 ongoing titles. Al Hewetson, editor of rival comics-magazine publisher Skywald Publications, which went defunct in 1975, blamed his company's demise on

...Marvel's distributor. Our issues were selling well, and some sold out. Such returns as we received were shipped overseas, mainly to England, where they sold out completely... When Marvel entered the game with countless [black-and-white horror] titles gutting [sic] the newsstand, their distributor was so powerful they denied Skywald access to all but the very largest newsstands, so our presence was minimal and fans and readers simply couldn't find us. ... [We] had a business lunch with our distributor in the fall of '74 and we were given very specific information about the state of affairs on the newsstands — which had nothing to do with Warren's or Skywald’s solid readership base.

=== 1975 revamp ===
Despite this victory, in 1975 the Marvel magazine line was revamped. All the horror titles were canceled (although several would then get an all-reprint, extra-thick "Annual" #1). The Deadly Hands of Kung Fu, Planet of the Apes, Savage Sword of Conan, and Crazy continued, and quite a few new titles were announced, promoted, and listed in the regular subscription ads, but almost none were released as ongoing publications. Marvel Super Action and Marvel Movie Premiere became one-shots, while Sherlock Holmes and Star-Lord surfaced in the Marvel Preview anthology. Some of the material intended for a self-titled magazine for the martial-arts superhero Iron Fist, whose four-color feature was at this time still appearing under the Marvel Premiere title, saw the light of publishing day in The Deadly Hands of Kung Fu #10. Masters of Terror and Doc Savage did manage two and eight issues respectively. The line would never again consist at one time of more titles than could be counted on the fingers of one hand.

1977 saw the debut of Rampaging Hulk (which later changed its title to The Hulk!, which ran through 1981).

=== 1981: Marvel Magazine Group, demise ===
Starting with 1981 cover dates, the line bore the name Marvel Magazine Group on such new titles as the Howard the Duck magazine as well as on such surviving titles as Savage Sword of Conan — the longest-lived magazine title, which lasted 235 issues through 1995.

Upon the line's demise, former editor Wolfman asserted that "Marvel never gave their full commitment to it, that was the problem. No one wanted to commit themselves to the staff."

== Titles published ==
=== Ongoing series (by initial publication date) ===
==== 1971 ====
- Savage Tales (1971, 1973–1975) — starred such sword-and-sorcery characters as Conan, Kull, and John Jakes' barbarian creation, Brak. Edited by Stan Lee (issue #1) Roy Thomas (#2–6), Gerry Conway (#7–11), Marv Wolfman (#11), and Archie Goodwin (#11).

==== 1972 ====
- Monster Madness, the first title in the Marvel Monster Group, presented black-and-white stills with humorous word balloons added by Stan Lee. The title ran three issues, from 1972-1973. Goodman had published a similar magazine, Monsters Unlimited, in the 1960s, and Magazine Management later released one issue of a political satire magazine in the same format, The Wit and Wisdom of Watergate, although that magazine had no apparent connection to Marvel Comics.

==== 1973 ====
- Crazy Magazine (1973–1983) — illustrated satire and humor magazine in the vein of Mad.
- Haunt of Horror (1973, 1974–1975) — originally published for two issues in 1973 as a prose digest with some spot and full-page illustrations, edited by Gerry Conway. The title was revived with a new #1 in 1974 in the black and white comics magazine format. The magazine version was edited by Roy Thomas (issues #1 & 2), Marv Wolfman (#2–4), Jenny Blake Isabella (#3 & 4), David Anthony Kraft (#5), and Don McGregor (#5).
- Dracula Lives (1973–1975) — published 13 issues and one Super Annual. Running concurrently with the longer-running Marvel comic Tomb of Dracula, the continuities of the two titles occasionally overlapped, with storylines weaving between the two. Most of the time, however, the stories in Dracula Lives! were stand-alone tales. The title published Dracula stories by various creative teams, including a serialized adaptation of the original Bram Stoker novel, in 10- to 12-page installments written by Thomas and drawn by Dick Giordano.
- Monsters Unleashed (1973–1975) — focused on Marvel's own monsters: Man-Thing, Werewolf by Night, and Frankenstein's monster. A Marvel Monster Group publication, Monsters Unleashed published 11 issues and one Super Annual.
- Tales of the Zombie (1973–1975) — published 10 issues and one Super Annual (which was co-edited by Archie Goodwin), many featuring Simon Garth stories by Steve Gerber and Pablo Marcos.
- Vampire Tales (1973–1975) — published 11 issues and one Super Annual, featured vampires as both protagonists and antagonists.

==== 1974 ====
- Comix Book (1974–1975) — canceled after three issues; revived for two more issues in 1976 by Kitchen Sink Press. Edited in both incarnations by Denis Kitchen.
- The Deadly Hands of Kung Fu (1974–1977) — published in response to the mid-1970s "Chopsocky" movie craze, this series ran for 33 issues and one special. Edited by Roy Thomas (issues #1 & 2), Jenny Blake Isabella (#3–6), Don McGregor (#7, 8, 10, 11, 16), David Anthony Kraft (#9 & 10), Archie Goodwin (#12–15, 18–25), and John Warner (#26–33).
- Monsters of the Movies (1974–1975) — covering classic and contemporary horror movies, Monsters of the Movies included interviews, articles and photo features. The magazine was an attempt to cash in on the success of Warren's Famous Monsters of Filmland (Another similar title with a similar goal was Monsters Unleashed.) The Monsters of the Movies staff was roughly composed of half freelancing West Coast horror fans, and half members of the Marvel bullpen located on the East Coast. The West Coast editor was short story author and popular culture historian Jim Harmon. Over time, tensions developed between the West Coast and East Coast staff cliques, a factor that may have contributed to the series ending after just nine issues. A postmortem by assistant editor Ralph Macchio, appeared the following year in the pages of Marvel Preview #8: The Legion of Monsters (1976) (one of Marvel's final stabs at launching a magazine starring horror characters), and seemed to blame the West Coasters for the failure, and left ill feelings among them in its wake, especially as Macchio was not even on Marvel's staff during the events he described.
- Planet of the Apes (1974–1977) — published 29 issues with adaptations of all five then-extant Apes movies, plus original stories set in the Ape Universe, and articles about the making of the movies and the short-lived TV series. Edited by Roy Thomas, Jenny Blake Isabella, Marv Wolfman, and Don McGregor. Marvel reprinted in color the first two film adaptations in the newsstand-distributed comic book Adventures On The Planet Of The Apes over eleven issues in 1975. Stories from the magazine were also reprinted in England by Marvel UK in a weekly title of 123 issues from 1974–1977.
- The Savage Sword of Conan (1974–1980; 1980–1995) — Published 235 issues but did not have the Marvel name on its cover until 1980, where it continued to have it until the title's cancellation in 1995.

==== 1975 ====
- Doc Savage (1975–1977) — eight issues featuring the "Man of Bronze" were published from 1975–1977. Edited by Marv Wolfman (issues #1 & 2), Archie Goodwin (#2–4), and John Warner (#5–8).
- Gothic Tales of Love (1975) — like The Deadliest Heroes of Kung Fu, Gothic Tales of Love, which published three issues in 1975, was a prose magazine with some spot illustrations; it did not contain any comics. Each issue featured three "book-length thrillers" by contemporary Gothic romance writers.
- Kull and the Barbarians (1975) — edited by Roy Thomas, three issues were published of the sword-and-sorcery title starring the Robert E. Howard hero Kull of Atlantis. The storyline, which involved Kull going on a quest to regain his lost kingdom, picked up from the cancelled Marvel title Kull the Conqueror. (After the cancellation of Kull and the Barbarians, the storyline was picked up again in the Marvel title Kull the Destroyer.)
- Marvel Preview (1975–1980)/Bizarre Adventures (1980–1983) — a showcase book, notable for publishing first and/or early appearances of Marvel characters like Blade (issue #3), Star-Lord (#4), Dominic Fortune (#2), Satana (#7), and many more. Issue #3 contained the Blade story that originally was going to be in Vampire Tales #12, had that title not been cancelled. It also featured the first teaming of the celebrated X-Men creative trio of writer Chris Claremont, penciller John Byrne, and inker Terry Austin (in issue #11, featuring Star-Lord.) After 24 issues the name was changed to Bizarre Adventures and published for ten more issues before folding in 1983. Edited by Roy Thomas (issue #1, 9, & 19), Marv Wolfman (#2 & 3), Archie Goodwin (#4–6), John Warner (#5–8, 10, 11, & 14), Ralph Macchio (#8, 10–19, & 21–24), Roger Slifer (#12), David Anthony Kraft (#13), Rick Marschall (#14–18), Mark Gruenwald (#19), and Roger Stern (#20), Lynn Graeme (#20–24).
- Masters of Terror (1975) — published black-and-white reprints of stories from early 1970s Marvel horror and suspense titles. The title lasted two issues and was edited by Jenny Blake Isabella.
- Unknown Worlds of Science Fiction (1975–1976) — edited by Roy Thomas, this anthology title featured original stories and literary adaptations by writers and artists including Frank Brunner, Howard Chaykin, Gene Colan, Gerry Conway, Richard Corben, Bruce Jones, Gray Morrow, Denny O'Neil, Thomas, and others; as well as non-fiction articles about science fiction and interviews with such authors as Alfred Bester, Frank Herbert, Larry Niven, and A. E. van Vogt, some of whom had their works adapted here. Cover artists included Brunner, Frank Kelly Freas, Michael Kaluta, Michael Whelan, and Sebastià Boada. The title published six issues and one special.

==== 1977 ====
- The Rampaging Hulk (1977–1978)/The Hulk! (1978–1981) — edited for its first nine issues by John Warner (issues #1–4), Roger Slifer (#5–7), and David Anthony Kraft (#8 & 9); then continued with issue #10 as The Hulk! (in "MarvelColor"), and then became an official Marvel title for its last three issues. As The Hulk! (from 1978–1981), it was edited by David Anthony Kraft (#10), Rick Marschall (#11–18), and Lynn Graeme (#19–27). Backups features included "Bloodstone", "Man-Thing", and "Shanna the She-Devil".

==== 1979 ====
- The Tomb of Dracula (1979–1980) — a black-and-white continuation of the 1972–1979 series, it ran for six issues through August 1980.

=== One-shots ===
- The Deadliest Heroes of Kung Fu (Summer 1975) — martial-arts magazine with no comic book elements. Instead, The Deadliest Heroes of Kung Fu contained instructional features by comics illustrator/martial artist Frank McLaughlin, and a reprinted discussion of the film Enter the Dragon originally published in three parts in The Deadly Hands of Kung Fu. The magazine carried no advertising. Editor John Warner explained in the magazine's editorial page that The Deadliest Heroes of Kung Fu was a test release for an all-articles companion to Deadly Hands.
- Legion of Monsters (Summer 1975) — anthology starring characters from other cancelled horror magazines, including Frankenstein's Monster, Dracula, and the Manphibian; storyline continued in Marvel Preview #8.
- Marvel Movie Premiere (1975) — edited by Marv Wolfman, Archie Goodwin, and John Warner, Marvel Movie Premiere featured Wolfman and Sonny Trinidad's adaptation of the 1975 movie The Land That Time Forgot.
- Marvel Super Action (1976) — edited by Archie Goodwin, featuring the Punisher on the cover, the second appearance of Howard Chaykin's Dominic Fortune, Bobbi Morse's first appearance as a costumed heroine, here called the Huntress but soon rechristened Mockingbird, and Doug Moench and Mike Ploog's first "Weirdworld" story. The last, according to the editorial, was pulled from inventory when the magazine was reduced from an ongoing series to an advertising-free one-shot. Marvel revived this title for an all-reprint color-comics series in 1977. It reprinted Captain America stories in the first 13 issues, then Avengers stories for the rest of its 37-issue run.

== See also ==
- Epic Illustrated
