= Monsters Unleashed =

Monsters Unleashed may refer to:

- Monsters Unleashed (comics), a Marvel Comics series
- Scooby-Doo 2: Monsters Unleashed, a Scooby-Doo film
