= Sam Kweskin =

American comic book artist (1924–2005)

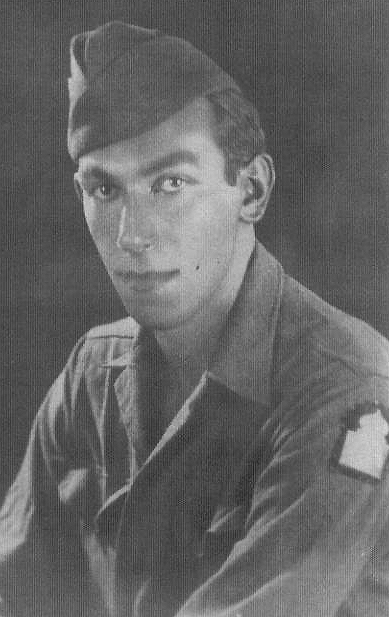
- U.S. Army photo, taken July 1944
- Born: Irving Sam Kweskin; February 24, 1924 Chicago, Illinois, U.S.
- Died: June 23, 2005 (aged 81)
- Area: Artist
- Pseudonym: Irv Wesley

Irving Samuel Kweskin (February 24, 1924—June 23, 2005), who sometimes worked under the name Irv Wesley, was an American advertising and comic-book artist. He was best known for his work at Marvel Comics.

== Biography ==
=== Early life and career ===
Adventures into Terror #17 (March 1953): Main image by Kweskin, one of his first works of comic-book art

Born on February 24, 1924 in Chicago, Illinois, and raised there with a sister, Sally, and a father who died when Kweskin was 11, Kweskin learned to draw by copying Sunday newspaper comics, particularly those of Hal Foster, on sheets of grocery wrapping paper. Per differing accounts, he either won a scholarship at 16 to the Studio School of Art, and the following summer enrolled in a course at the Chicago Academy of Fine Arts, or before his senior year of high school won a scholarship to a summer course at the Academy. By both accounts one classmate was the future celebrated military cartoonist Bill Mauldin. At 16, through a neighbor who worked with Foster's brother, Kweskin visited Foster at the respected writer-illustrator's Evanston, Illinois, attic studio and subsequently "wrote a story about my visit for my high school newspaper." After high school, Kweskin worked as a night-shift copyboy for Chicago Tribune newspaper, and then entered the U.S. Army.

Private Kweskin did military service February 1943 to December 1945, during World War II, joining the 83rd Chemical Mortar Battalion in September 1944 as a military artist, contributing to the military periodicals Muzzleblasts and Rounds Away. and said he was among the Allied troops who helped liberate the Dachau concentration camp. After his discharge, he studied at the Art Institute of Chicago, receiving a Bachelor of Fine Arts degree in early 1949. He worked for a year with former Walt Disney Pictures animator Sam Singer, doing two children's cartoon series for the local ABC-TV station. Kweskin then left to develop his own local children's-TV programs.

He later drew comic-book bible stories for David C. Cook Publishing in Elgin, Illinois. A friend put Kweskin in touch with New York City's Atlas Comics, the 1950s precursor of Marvel Comics, and Kweskin "flew into NYC in August or September 1952" to meet with Atlas editor-in-chief Stan Lee. Kweskin began freelancing for Atlas from Chicago before eventually moving with his family to New York City.

=== Atlas and advertising ===
Kweskin's earliest confirmed credits include penciling and self-inking stories in five Atlas comics cover-dated February 1953: The horror/mystery books Strange Tales #15, Adventures Into Terror #16, Astonishing #22 and Spellbound #12, and the war comic Battlefront #9. He continued drawing stories for such Atlas horror anthologies as Journey into Mystery, Marvel Tales, and Uncanny Tales, Western titles including Kid Colt, Outlaw and Wild Western, and even Bible Tales for Young Folk.

He recalled of his Atlas stint that he was:

moved by the fact that [editor-in-chief] Stan [Lee] was never stand-offish, and always found time to sit in his office with an artist to just talk. He immediately gave me another story, which I completed to his satisfaction. Eventually, I had to return to Chicago; after the first NY trip I took two more excursions that Fall/Winter to make certain that I might decide to move East — in fact, Stan had been sending me scripts and said that, '[O]f course, you could do more work if you lived here.' My wife was especially thrilled with New York — I had never been there except on a soldier's pass for a day or so — and so I moved first to NYC, found an apartment, and was followed by my wife and two small children.

After about a year, during a downturn in the comics industry, Kweskin returned to commercial illustration, saying in letters to two comics historians that he "went to work as a studio artist for a while" and then became an art director for an industrial film production company and later at "an agency doing mostly Latin American advertising," followed by a similar position at a different agency working on television commercials. He said he continued to do freelance work including medical illustrations for Merck Manual of Diagnosis and Therapy, "and, in a couple of years, maintained a small agency of my own."

In 1957, he freelanced briefly again for Atlas on science fiction / fantasy and war comics.

=== Marvel Comics ===
In the early 1970s, Kweskin briefly returned to freelancing for what was now formally Marvel Comics. He both wrote and penciled a six-page horror tale, "Revenge from the Rhine", in Journey into Mystery vol. 2, #3 (Feb. 1973), and then succeeded Sub-Mariner creator Bill Everett on that character's comic-book title following Everett's death; Kweskin and Everett together penciled issue #58 (Feb. 1973), with Everett inking and Kweskin variously penciled or laid out #59-60 and 62-63. Kweskin also filled in for Gene Colan and penciled Daredevil #99 (May 1973).

As Kweskin wrote in a 2002 e-mail excerpted in an article by comics historian Ken Quattro:

I did have lunch with Bill [Everett] one day after he had had a heart attack somewhat earlier that month, and [Marvel publisher] Stan Lee suggested we get together for me to get the 'feel' of Bill's approach to a strip that he had developed. And so I began doing Sub-Mariner. ... Whether [editor-in-chief] Roy Thomas or Stan or I decided it was not in the cards to continue it after a few issues, I can't remember, since at the time I was also president of my own small ad/art agency and responsible to several employees. Much of my time there had to be spent doing ad layouts and — on occasion — writing copy".

=== Later career ===
Afterward he spent three years as an art director at Ziff-Davis magazines, and then freelanced for 10 years as an ad-agency storyboard artist. Kweskin also painted and sketched, including several works depicting Manhattan's Upper West Side, where he lived for approximately 40 years before moving to Boca Raton, Florida, in 1993. He exhibited his art work venues including New York City's Grand Central Galleries, the Salmagundi Club, and the Society of Illustrators. His latter-life freelance work included a cover for the Veterans of Foreign Wars magazine, and painted a commissioned canvas for a military museum in Louisiana.

== Personal life ==
Kweskin at the end of his life was no longer with wife Corinne. He had three children: son Joel and daughters Jean and Barbara, the latter of whom predeceased him. The Barbara Kweskin Scholarship Fund at the Art Institute of Chicago is named for her.
