= Win Mortimer =

Canadian comic book and comic strip artist (1919–1998)

- Mortimer at his drawing board
- Born: James Winslow Mortimer; May 1, 1919 Hamilton, Ontario, Canada
- Died: January 11, 1998 (aged 78)
- Area: Penciller
- Notable works: Action Comics; Adventure Comics; Star-Spangled Comics; The Superman Family

James Winslow "Win" Mortimer (May 1, 1919 – January 11, 1998) was a Canadian comic book and comic strip artist best known as one of the major illustrators of the DC Comics superhero Superman. He additionally drew for Marvel Comics, Gold Key Comics, and other publishers.

He was a 2006 inductee into the Canadian comics creators Joe Shuster Hall of Fame.

== Biography ==
=== Early life and career ===
Win Mortimer was born in Hamilton, Ontario, Canada. Trained as an artist by his father, who worked for a lithography company, and at the Art Students League of New York, Mortimer found work as an illustrator after a short stint in the Canadian Army during World War II. Discharged in 1943, Mortimer found work designing posters.

=== DC Comics ===
Mortimer began working for DC Comics in 1945, and quickly became a cover artist for comics featuring Superman, Superboy and Batman. His first known comics work is as the penciler and inker of the 12-page lead Batman story, "The Batman Goes Broke" by writer Don Cameron, in Detective Comics #105 (Nov. 1945); contractually credited to Bob Kane, it is also signed "Mortimer." The introduction of Batman's Batboat in Detective Comics #110 (April 1946) was another Cameron/Mortimer collaboration. Mortimer launched a Robin feature in Star Spangled Comics #65 (Feb. 1947).

Mortimer image from the 1978 Marvel Comics Calendar.

He succeeded Wayne Boring on the Superman newspaper strip in 1949, leaving it in 1956 to create the adventure strip David Crane for the Prentice-Hall Syndicate. Following his run on that series, Mortimer produced the Larry Bannon strip for the Toronto Star beginning in 1960.

During the same period, Mortimer returned to DC and worked on a large variety of comics, ranging from humor titles such as Swing with Scooter to superhero features starring the Legion of Super-Heroes and Supergirl. He and writer Arnold Drake co-created Stanley and His Monster in 1965.

=== Later life and career ===
By the early 1970s, Mortimer was also freelancing for other publishers. At Marvel, he drew virtually every story in the TV tie-in children's comic Spidey Super Stories, starring Spider-Man, for its entire 57-issue run (Oct. 1974 – March 1982) as well as the short-lived Night Nurse series. Mortimer's work at Gold Key Comics included Boris Karloff Tales of Mystery, The Twilight Zone, and Battle Of The Planets. He left comics in 1983 to do advertising and commercial art for Neal Adams' studio, Continuity Associates.

Mortimer's last superhero art was the four-issue DC miniseries World of Metropolis (Aug.–Nov. 1988), plus some character drawings for the reference Who's Who in the Legion of Super-Heroes #7 (Nov. 1988). His final comics work was penciling the four page "Noble Heart" story for The Big Book of Martyrs (Aug. 1997).

== Awards and honors ==
Mortimer is a 2006 inductee into the Canadian comics' creators Joe Shuster Hall of Fame.

== Bibliography ==
Comics work (interior art) includes:

=== DC Comics ===
- Action Comics (Superman) #101, 113–114, 117, 119, 129; (Legion of Super-Heroes) #378–387, 389–392; (Lori Lemaris) #475 (1946–1977)
- Adventure Comics (Superboy) #119; (Legion of Super-Heroes) #373–380; (Supergirl) #381, 383–389, 391–396, 415; (Zatanna) #421 (1947–1972)
- The Adventures of Alan Ladd #2 (1949)
- All-American Men of War #106 (1964)
- Batman #33, 176, 304 (1946–1978)
- The Best of DC #45 (1984)
- The Big Book of Martyrs #1 (1997)
- Big Town #2–6 (1951)
- Binky #73 (1970)
- Binky's Buddies #5, 7–11 (1969–1970)
- The Brave and the Bold #63–64, 69 (1965–1966)
- Captain Storm #17 (1967)
- DC 100-Page Super Spectacular #DC-5 (1971)
- Detective Comics (Batman) #105, 107, 109–112, 114–116, 120 (1945–1947)
- Falling in Love #82, 98, 104, 112, 120 (1966–1971)
- Forbidden Tales of Dark Mansion #7, 11 (1972–1973)
- The Fox and the Crow #94–98, 100–102, 106–108 (1965–1968)
- Gang Busters #5–6, 9, 28, 47 (1948–1955)
- Ghosts #89, 91, 94 (1980)
- Girls' Romances #141 (1969)
- Heart Throbs #110 (1967)
- House of Mystery #178, 204 (1969–1972)
- Inferior Five #7–10 (1968)
- Leave It To Binky #71 (1970)
- Love Stories #147 (1972)
- Miss Beverly Hills of Hollywood #3–4, 7 (1949–1950)
- Mr. District Attorney #8, 18, 43 (1949–1955)
- My Greatest Adventure #8 (1956)
- Plastic Man #2–7 (1967)
- Real Fact Comics #5, 7–14, 19–20 (1946–1949)
- Secret Hearts #133, 136, 139 (1969)
- Secrets of Haunted House #8 (1977)
- Stanley and His Monster #110 (1968)
- Star Spangled Comics #65–91 (1947–1949)
- Superman #50–52, 72 (1948–1951)
- The Superman Family (Lois Lane) #185–188, 190–193; (Jimmy Olsen) #187; (Supergirl) #199–222 (1977–1982)
- Superman's Pal Jimmy Olsen (Newsboy Legion) #150 (1972)
- Swing with Scooter #21, 23–24 (1969–1970)
- The Unexpected #212 (1981)
- Who's Who in the Legion of Super-Heroes #4, 6–7 (1988)
- The Witching Hour #4, 9, 22, 27 (1969–1973)
- Wonder Woman #177 (1968)
- World of Metropolis #1–4 (1988)
- World's Finest Comics #20–26, 29–30, 43–48 (1945–1950)
- Young Love #82–83, 87–88, 111, 114, 123, 126 (1970–1977)
- Young Romance #150, 162, 208 (1967–1975)

=== Gold Key Comics ===
- Battle of the Planets #1–5 (1979–1980)
- Doctor Solar, Man of the Atom #15–27 (1965–1969)

=== Marvel Comics ===
- The Amazing Spider-Man #220 (1981)
- Avengers Spotlight #37 (1990)
- Barbie #17, 21, 22, 25, 31, 32, 38, 53 (1992–1995)
- Barbie Fashion #16, 17, 45 (1992–1994)
- Dracula Lives #10–11 (1975)
- Giant-Size Chillers #1 (1975)
- Haunt of Horror #3 (1974)
- Journey into Mystery vol. 2 #4–5 (1973)
- Marvel Premiere #59 (Werewolf by Night backup story) (1981)
- Marvel Super Special #23 (Annie movie adaptation) (1982)
- Monsters Unleashed #3, 5 (1973–1974)
- My Love #19, 21 (1972–1973)
- Night Nurse #1–4 (1972–1973)
- Spidey Super Stories (Spider-Man) #1–57 (1974–1982)
- Spoof #4–5 (1973)
- Supernatural Thrillers #4 (Strange Case of Dr Jekyll and Mr Hyde adaptation) (1973)
- Tales of the Zombie #2, 4, 7 (1973–1974)
- Vampire Tales #1, 5 (1973–1974)
- What The--?! #8, 10, 14 (1990–1991)

Preceded by Wayne Boring	Superman newspaper strip artist 1949–1956	Succeeded by Curt Swan
Preceded by Don Heck	"Supergirl" feature in The Superman Family artist 1980–1982	Succeeded by n/a
