= Vampire Tales =

- Vampire Tales #1 (Aug. 1973). Painted cover by Esteban Maroto.

Publication information
- Publisher: Magazine Management
- Publication date: 1973 - June 1975
- No. of issues: 11, plus 1 Super Annual

Creative team
- Written by: Don McGregor, Doug Moench, Marv Wolfman, Roy Thomas, Ron Goulart, Tony Isabella
- Artist(s): Pablo Marcos, Rich Buckler, Tom Sutton, Mike Vosburg, Sonny Trinidad, Tony DeZuniga, John Romita Sr., Carlos Garzon, Win Mortimer, Vicente Alcazar, Esteban Maroto

Vampire Tales was an American black-and-white horror comics magazine published by Magazine Management, a corporate sibling of Marvel Comics. The series ran 11 issues and one annual publication from 1973 to 1975, and featuring vampires as both protagonists and antagonists.

A magazine rather than a comic book, it did not fall under the purview of the comics industry's self-censorship Comics Code Authority, allowing the title to feature stronger content — such as moderate profanity, partial nudity, and more graphic violence — than the color comics of the time that featured Dracula stories.

== Publishing history ==
Vampire Tales ran 11 issues cover-dated August 1973 to June 1975. With sister titles including Dracula Lives, Monsters Unleashed and Tales of the Zombie, it was published by Marvel Comics' parent company, Magazine Management, and related corporations, under the brand emblem Marvel Monster Group. Published bi-monthly, the magazine cost 75 cents.

The magazine starred Morbius the Living Vampire, in a feature written primarily by Don McGregor, with pencillers including Pablo Marcos, Rich Buckler, Tom Sutton, and Mike Vosburg, and later by writer Doug Moench, with artist Sonny Trinidad. The vampire hunter Blade the Vampire Slayer starred in two stories by writer Marv Wolfman and artist Tony DeZuniga, in issues #8-9 (Dec. 1974 - Feb. 1975). Steve Gerber contributed a Morbius story to issue #1 (Aug. 1973) and a story starring Lilith, Dracula's daughter, to issue #6 (Aug. 1974).

Issue #2 (Oct. 1973) introduced Satana the Devil's Daughter, in a four-page teaser by writer-editor Roy Thomas and artist John Romita Sr.; and detective Hodiah Twist and his assistant Conrad Jeavons, created by Don McGregor and penciller Carlos Garzon.

Writer Ron Goulart and Roy Thomas and artist Win Mortimer adapted the vampire short story "The Vampyre", by John Polidori, in issue #1. Other adaptations included writer Don McGregor and artist Vicente Alcazar's "Bat's Belfry" in issue #3 (Oct. 1973) and writer Tony Isabella and artist Esteban Maroto's "The Drifting Snow" in issue #4 (April 1974), both from August Derleth short stories.

Stories reprinted from Marvel's 1950s predecessor Atlas Comics included pre-Comics Code Authority work by such artists as Bill Everett and Carmine Infantino. Other reprints included writer-artist Jim Steranko's "At the Stroke of Midnight" from Tower of Shadows #1 (Sept. 1969) and the 11-page Morbius origin sequence from The Amazing Spider-Man #102 (Nov. 1971).

Vampire Tales Super Annual was published in 1975, reprinting stories from the magazine. It lasted one issue.

Marvel Preview #3 (Sept. 1975) and 6 (Dec. 1975) concluded the four-part Blade story begun in Vampire Tales #8-9, of which the third part from issue #3 would have been in Vampire Tales #12 (as originally announced at the end of issue #11 (June 1975)) had that title not been cancelled.

== Collected editions ==
- Blade the Vampire-Slayer: Black & White (collects the Blade stories from Vampire Tales #8-9)
- Vampire Tales Vol. 1 (collects Vampire Tales #1-3)
- Vampire Tales Vol. 2 (collects Vampire Tales #4-7)
- Vampire Tales Vol. 3 (collects Vampire Tales #8-11)
