= Tank Tankuro =

1934 manga by Gajo Sakomoto

Tank Tankuro (タンクタンクロー, Tanku tankurō) is a 1934 manga written and drawn by Gajō Sakamoto. The comic features the eponymous character, a robot-like character with a round iron body who could transform into various shapes and produce anything he wanted from the hole in his belly. He fights his archenemy, Kuro Kabuto (Black Helmet).

Tank Tankuro is considered one of the first robot and science fiction manga, inspiring characters like Osamu Tezuka's Astro Boy and Fujiko Fujio's Doraemon; however it was preceded by the 1929 comic story Jinzō ningen (Artificial human) by Suihō Tagawa.

== Publication history ==
Sakamoto published Tank Tankuro's stories as a yonkoma for the Chugai Shougyou Shimbun (current Nihon Keizai Shimbun). He felt he needed a bigger space for his stories and turned to Kodansha, presenting a draft to the editor of Yonen Club magazine. The draft was accepted, and Sakamoto published Tank Tankuro's stories in the magazine for four years.

In 2010, a collection of Tank Tankuro's stories was published in English by Presspop. It was reissued in 2017 by Fantagraphics.
