= Bill Everett =

American comic book artist

- Everett in a 1940s Timely Comics promotional image
- Born: William Blake Everett; May 18, 1917 Cambridge, Massachusetts, U.S.
- Died: February 27, 1973 (aged 55) New York City, U.S.
- Areas: Writer, Penciller, Inker
- Pseudonyms: William Blake, Everett Blake; Willie Bee; Bill Roman
- Notable works: Sub-Mariner; Zombie; Daredevil
- Awards: The Will Eisner Award Hall of Fame, 2000
- Children: 3

William Blake Everett (/ˈɛvərɪt/; May 18, 1917 – February 27, 1973) was an American comic book writer and artist best known for creating Namor the Sub-Mariner, as well as co-creating Daredevil and the zombie Simon Garth with writer Stan Lee for Marvel Comics.

== Early life ==
Everett was born on May 18, 1917, in Cambridge, Massachusetts. Everett, a fabulist who spun fanciful stories of his youth, claimed at various points to have graduated from high school in Arizona, or instead to have joined the U.S. Merchant Marine at ages ranging from 15 to 17, among other tales. In actuality, he was born at the Cambridge Hospital (renamed Mount Auburn Hospital in 1947) and raised in nearby Watertown, Massachusetts, with his parents Robert Maxwell Everett and Elaine Grace Brown Everett, and his sister Elizabeth, born in 1915. His 300-year-old New England family included Everett, Massachusetts' namesake, Edward Everett, who after serving as president of Harvard University became governor of Massachusetts and, in 1852, the U.S. Secretary of State. It also includes Edward's son, Massachusetts Congressman William Everett; and the poet William Blake.

Everett's father ran a successful trucking business, and when Everett was young the family bought a large summer home in Kennebunkport, Maine. Both parents supported the artistic talents of their son, whose reading tastes ran to the classics rather than pulp novels or comic strips, and included work by Samuel Taylor Coleridge and Jack London. He would later find artistic influence in such commercial magazine artists as Mead Schaeffer, Dean Cornwell, and especially Floyd MacMillan Davis.

At 12, in 1929, Everett contracted tuberculosis, and was pulled from sixth grade to go with his mother and his sister to Arizona, to recuperate for four months. They then returned to Massachusetts, but a recurrence of the disease sent the trio back West, first to Prescott, Arizona, and then to Wickenburg, 60 miles away. There, taking his first drink, Everett began the path to teenage alcoholism. Nonetheless, he became well enough by 16 to return home with his mother and sister to the Boston area, where his father, unscathed by the Great Depression, had a large house in West Newton. His alcoholism and natural rebelliousness caused his parents to remove him from high school at age 16, in his second year, and enroll him in 1934 at Boston's Vesper George School of Art. His inability to focus, however, led him to drop out in 1935, after a year-and-a-half of the program.

That same year, his father died of acute appendicitis, and the family, though remaining well-off, moved to an apartment back in Cambridge. Everett knew his father "always wanted me to be a cartoonist, and he died, unfortunately, before he saw that come true. But that was probably in back of the whole thing."

== Career ==
=== Early work ===
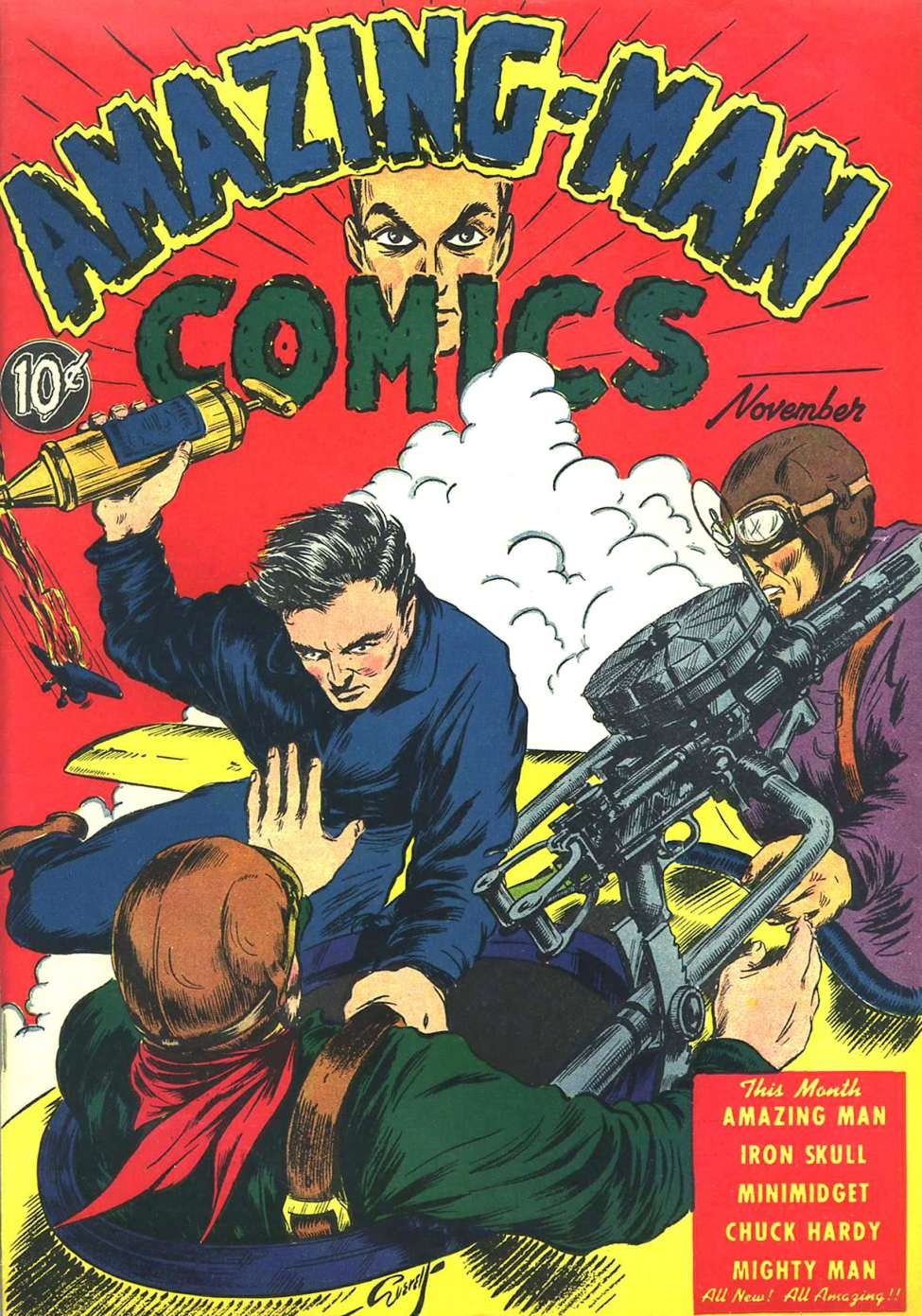
Cover of Amazing-Man Comics #7, November, 1939

Everett soon became a professional artist on the advertising staff of the Boston newspaper The Herald-Traveler for $12 a week. Soon afterward, he left to become a draftsman for the civil engineering firm The Brooks System, in Newton, Massachusetts. From there he pursued work in Phoenix, Arizona, and Los Angeles, California, without success. He then returned east to New York City, where he again did newspaper advertising art, for the New York Herald-Tribune. He next became art editor for Teck Publications' Radio News magazine, then assistant art director under Herm Bollin in Chicago, Illinois. Fired for being, as Everett described, "too cocky", he returned to New York where he sought employment as an art director. With no luck at this and desperate for work, he ran into an old Teck colleague, Walter Holze, who was now working in the new field of comic books. As Everett recalled in the late 1960s, "He asked me if I could do comics. I said, 'Sure!!' At that point I was starving. I wasn't interested in the comics business; I was talked into it".

Freelancing for Centaur Publications, Everett "sold my first page for $2 – writing, penciling, inking and all. 'Skyrocket Steele' was my first strip." Soon he was getting $10 and then $14 a page, a respectable sum during this late-1930s period near the beginning of what historians and fans call the Golden Age of comic books. Everett co-created the superhero Amazing-Man at Centaur, working with company art director Lloyd Jacquet, and drew the first five issues.

Everett and other creators followed Jacquet to his new company Funnies, Inc., one of the first comic-book "packagers" that would create comics on demand for publishers. Everett recalled

I left Centaur with Lloyd Jacquet and another chap whose name was Max; I cannot remember his last name. Lloyd... had an idea that he wanted to start his own art service – to start a small organization to supply artwork and editorial material to publishers. ... He asked me to join him. He also asked Carl Burgos. So we were the nucleus.... I don't know how to explain it, but I was still on a freelance basis. That was the agreement we had. The artists, including myself, at Funnies, worked on a freelance basis."

=== Sub-Mariner ===
At Funnies, Inc., Everett created the Sub-Mariner for an aborted project, Motion Picture Funnies Weekly #1, a planned promotional comic to be given away in movie theaters. When plans changed, Everett used his character instead for Funnies, Inc.'s first client, pulp magazine publisher Martin Goodman. The original eight-page story was expanded by four pages for Marvel Comics #1 (Oct. 1939), the first publication of what Goodman would eventually call Timely Comics, the 1940s precursor of Marvel Comics. Everett's anti-hero proved a sudden success, quickly becoming one of Timely's top three characters, along with Carl Burgos' android superhero the Human Torch and Jack Kirby and Joe Simon's Captain America. Everett soon introduced such supporting characters as New York City policewoman Betty Dean, a steady companion and occasional love-interest, and Namor's cousin Namora.

Everett drew his star character in many issues of Sub-Mariner Comics, published first quarterly, then thrice-yearly and finally bimonthly, for issues #1–32 (Fall 1941 – June 1949). When his work was interrupted by military service, stories were drawn by Carl Pfeufer.

Everett entered the U.S. Army for World War II military service in February 1942. He attended Officer Candidate School at Fort Belvoir, during which time he met Gwenn Randall, who was working for the Ordnance Department at the Pentagon. The couple married in 1944, when Everett returned from the European theater of operations, and their first child, a daughter, was born shortly before he was shipped out to the Philippines to fight in the Pacific theater; he returned home in February 1946. With money inherited from a great-uncle, Everett took some time off and traveled before settling in Fairbury, Nebraska, his wife's hometown. "This was when I renewed my association with Martin Goodman, working by mail on a freelance basis, picking up the Sub-Mariner where I'd left off four years ago". His first recorded post-war credit is writing and full art for the 12-page story "Sub-Mariner vs. Green-Out" in Sub-Mariner Comics #21 (Fall 1946) – the third of three Sub-Mariner stories that issue, for which Syd Shores drew the cover. Everett was soon providing Sub-Mariner stories regularly for the solo title as well as for The Human Torch, Marvel Mystery Comics and even Blonde Phantom Comics.

Additionally, he drew the title feature in the three-issue spin-off series Namora (Aug.–Dec. 1948).

Early pseudonyms included Willie Bee and Bill Roman.

=== Atlas Comics ===
By now, Timely Comics had evolved into Marvel's 1950s iteration, Atlas Comics. Like most superhero characters in the postwar era, the Sub-Mariner had faded in popularity, and his solo title had been canceled in 1949. But after a nearly five-year hiatus, he briefly returned with Captain America and the Golden Age Human Torch in Young Men #24 (Dec. 1953), during Atlas' mid-1950s attempt at reviving superheroes. Everett drew the Sub-Mariner feature through Young Men #28 (June 1954) and in Sub-Mariner Comics #33–42 (April 1954 – Oct. 1955), which outlasted the other two characters' features. During this time, Namora had her own spin-off series.

Everett also drew the features "Venus" and "Marvel Boy", as well as a large number of stories for Atlas' anthological horror-fantasy series. One such tale, "Zombie!," written by editor-in-chief Stan Lee and published in Menace #5, introduced the character Simon Garth, the Zombie, who in the 1970s would be plucked from this one-shot story to star in Marvel's black-and-white horror-comics magazine Tales of the Zombie.

=== Marvel Comics ===
With writer-editor Lee, Everett co-created the Marvel superhero Daredevil, who debuted in Daredevil #1 (April 1964). Comics historian and former Jack Kirby assistant Mark Evanier, investigating claims of Kirby's involvement in the creation of both Iron Man and Daredevil, interviewed Kirby and Everett and found that,

...in both cases, Jack had already drawn the covers of those issues and done some amount of design work. He ... seems to have participated in the design of Daredevil's first costume. ... Everett did tell me that Jack had come up with the idea of Daredevil's billy club. . . . Jack, in effect, drew the first page of that first Daredevil story. In the rush to get that seriously late book to press, there wasn't time to complete Page One, so Stan had [production manager] Sol Brodsky slap together a paste-up that employed Kirby's cover drawing. . . . Everett volunteered to me that Jack had 'helped him' though he wouldn't – or more likely, couldn't – elaborate on that. He just plain didn't remember it well, and in later years apparently gave others who asked a wide range of answers.

Conversely, 2000s Marvel editor-in-chief Joe Quesada said the cover had been created afterward. When Everett, he said, turned in his first-issue pencils extremely late, Brodsky and Spider-Man artist Steve Ditko inked "a lot of backgrounds and secondary figures on the fly [and] cobbled the cover and the splash page together from Kirby's original concept drawing."

In an interview conducted by Marvel writer-editor and Everett's one-time roommate Roy Thomas, in what the latter recalled as either "late 1969 or in 1970," Everett said of Daredevil's creation five years earlier:

I must have called Stan, had some contact with him, I don't know why. I know we tried to do it on the phone. I know he had this idea for Daredevil; he thought he had an idea. . . . With a long-distance phone call, it just wasn't coming out right, so I said, 'All right, I'll come down this weekend or something. I'll take a day off [from his job as art director of Eton Paper Corporation in Massachusetts] and come down to New York'. . . . I did the one issue, but I found that I couldn't do it and handle my job, because it was a managerial job; I didn't get paid overtime but I was on an annual salary, so my time was not my own. I was putting in 14 or 15 hours a day at the plant and then to come home and try to do comics at night was just too much. And I didn't make deadlines – I just couldn't make them – so I just did the one issue and didn't do any more.

Everett, from photo gallery in Fantastic Four Annual #7 (Nov. 1969)

Within two years, however, Everett began penciling for Marvel once again, first on the character the Hulk, in Tales to Astonish, initially over Kirby layouts, and on Doctor Strange in Strange Tales. Readers during this 1960s Silver Age of comic books also became acquainted with his Golden Age and 1950s stories, which were reprinted first in the book The Great Comic Book Heroes by Jules Feiffer (Dial Press, 1965), and then in the comic books Fantasy Masterpieces, Marvel Super-Heroes, and Marvel Tales.

A multi-talented creator, he wrote issues #77-79 of Marvel's Sgt Fury and his Howling Commandos, inked Jack Kirby's pencilled drawings on Thor and Gene Colan's pencils on the Black Widow stories in Amazing Adventures, and colored several of Marvel's comics, including the first issue of the Silver Surfer.

Everett even returned to his enduring character, first inking Namor's adventures in Tales to Astonish #85–86, then taking over full artistic duties for issues #87–91 and #94, and penciling issues #95–96. He then did complete stories – writing, penciling and inking – on Sub-Mariner #50–55 and 57 (June 1972 – Nov. 1972; Jan. 1973), with script assists by Mike Friedrich on two issues; and #58 (Feb. 1973), co-written with Steve Gerber and co-penciled with Sam Kweskin as his health began to deteriorate for the final time. He co-wrote and inked Sub-Mariner #59 (March 1973), plotted #60 (April 1973), and co-wrote, co-penciled (with fellow Golden Ager Win Mortimer), and co-inked #61 (May 1973). He had also been announced to draw an issue of Marvel Team-Up starring Spider-Man and the Sub-Mariner, but, according to one contemporaneous report, "was not able to finish this one before his death."

Editor Roy Thomas explained on the letters page of Sub-Mariner #61,

As you've no doubt noticed from the first three pages of this issue, Everett was back…and better than ever! And then, with only those three pages completed, [he] took ill. And, sad to say, it's the kind of illness that's going to keep him off Sub-Mariner (or any mag) for a month or two to come."

Despite Thomas's optimistic tone, that would be Everett's last work on the series. His final efforts on the character he created were five pages of pencils, inked by fellow Golden Ager Fred Kida, that appeared posthumously in Super-Villain Team-Up #1 (Aug. 1975).

Artist Gene Colan said that Everett had been Lee's first choice to draw the horror series Tomb of Dracula, which premiered in 1972 and for which Colan then lobbied successfully.

== Death ==
Everett died on February 27, 1973, at the age of 55.
