= Marvel Preview =

Comics magazine

- Cover of Marvel Preview #1 (February 1975). Art by Neal Adams

Publication information
- Publisher: Marvel Comics
- Schedule: Quarterly
- Format: Magazine
- Genre: Adventure; Science fiction Sword and sorcery Superhero
- Publication date: 1975–Winter 1980 (as Marvel Preview); March 1981–February 1983 (as Bizarre Adventures)
- No. of issues: 34 (#1–24 as Marvel Preview #25–34 as Bizarre Adventures)

Creative team
- Written by: List: Chris Claremont Steve Englehart Steve Gerber Tony Isabella Gil Kane Bill Mantlo Doug Moench Roger Stern Roy Thomas
- Penciller: List: Bob Brown John Buscema Sal Buscema John Byrne Howard Chaykin Dave Cockrum Gene Colan Tony DeZuniga Lee Elias Keith Giffen Ed Hannigan Carmine Infantino Michael Kaluta Gil Kane Val Mayerik Michael Netzer (Nasser) George Pérez Mike Ploog Bill Sienkiewicz Jim Starlin Herb Trimpe Sonny Trinidad
- Inker: List: Dan Adkins Terry Austin Tony DeZuniga Pablo Marcos Bob McLeod Tom Palmer George Roussos Josef Rubinstein Bob Wiacek
- Colorist: Marie Severin

Marvel Preview is a black-and-white comics magazine published by Magazine Management for fourteen issues and the affiliated Marvel Comics Group for ten issues. The final issue additionally carried the imprint Marvel Magazines Group.

== Publication history ==
An umbrella title that showcased a different heroic-adventure, science-fiction, or sword-and-sorcery character in virtually every issue. The title introduced the Marvel Comics characters Dominic Fortune in issue #2, Star-Lord in #4, and Rocket Raccoon in #7. The vigilante character the Punisher, introduced as an antagonist in the comic book The Amazing Spider-Man, had his first solo story in issue #2.

The magazine experienced scheduling difficulties, with various "Next Issue" announcements proving unreliable. Issue #2 promised an adventure of the Marvel superhero Thor in #3, but a Blade story appeared, with the Thor story remaining unseen until #10. As well, two different issues, #20 and 24, are dated "Winter 1980, at the start and end of the year." Issue #20 was to have included photographs from the Japanese Spider-Man television program, but instead featured Howard Chaykin's Dominic Fortune. In addition, Robert A. Heinlein's lawyers threatened legal action over the cover of Marvel Preview #11, which featured a blurb that described the Star-Lord content as "a novel-length science fiction spectacular in the tradition of Robert A. Heinlein," leading to the issue being pulled and reprinted.

With #25 (March 1981), the title was changed to Bizarre Adventures, which ran for an additional ten issues before ceasing publication. To offset the dark tone of most of the stories, editor Denny O'Neil had writer Steve Skeates produce a humor feature called Bucky Bizarre to close out each issue. A story originally prepared for Marvel's Logan's Run comic book series was published in Bizarre Adventures #28 (Oct. 1981). The final issue, #34, was a standard-sized color comic book, featuring the cover-blurb, "Special Hate the Holidays Issue", with anthological Christmas-related stories, including one starring Howard the Duck.

== Issues ==
Issue (cover date)	Feature	Notes	Collected Editions
#1 (1975)	"Man-Gods From Beyond the Stars"	Based on the works of Erich Von Däniken	
#2 (1975)	"The Punisher"	back-up: Dominic Fortune (debut)	Essential Punisher Vol. 1; Punisher: Back to the War Omnibus; Punisher Epic Collection Vol. 1: The Punisher Strikes Dominic Fortune: It Can Happen Here and Now
#3 (September 1975)	"Blade the Vampire-Slayer"	originally was going to be in the never-released Vampire Tales #12	Blade: Black & White; Blade: The Early Years Omnibus; Marvel Horror Lives Again! Omnibus
#4 (January 1976)	"Star-Lord" (debut)	back-up: The Sword in the Star with Prince Wayfinder	Star-Lord: Guardian of the Galaxy; Guardians Of The Galaxy Solo Classic Omnibus
#5 (April 1976)	"Sherlock Holmes"	adaptation of the novel The Hound of the Baskervilles part 1	
#6 (Spring 1976)	"Sherlock Holmes"	The Hound of the Baskervilles part 2	Blade: Black & White (back-up)
#7 (Summer 1976)	"Satana"	back-up: The Sword in the Star with Prince Wayfinder, featuring the debut of Rocket Raccoon	Essential Marvel Horror Vol. 1; Marvel Horror Lives Again! Omnibus; Rocket Raccoon: Guardian of the Keystone Quadrant; Rocket Raccoon and Groot; Guardians Of The Galaxy Solo Classic Omnibus (back-up)
#8 (Fall 1976)	"The Legion of Monsters"	Morbius the Living Vampire, Blade, and Anubis	Morbius Epic Collection Vol 2; Morbius the Living Vampire Omnibus Vol 1; Blade: The Early Years Omnibus; Marvel Horror Lives Again! Omnibus
#9 (Winter 1976)	"Man-God" (Hugo Danner)	Part 1 of an unfinished adaptation of the novel Gladiator by Philip Wylie	
#10 (Winter 1977)	"Thor"	back-up: Hercules	Thor Epic Collection Vol 9
#11 (Summer 1977)	"Star-Lord"		Star-Lord: Guardian of the Galaxy; Guardians of the Galaxy Solo Classic Omnibus; Marvel Universe by John Byrne Omnibus
#12 (Fall 1977)	"The Haunt of Horror"	Lilith and Dracula	Tomb of Dracula Complete Collection Vol 5; Marvel Horror Lives Again! Omnibus
#13 (Winter 1978)	"The UFO Connection"		
#14 (Spring 1978)	"Star-Lord"		Star-Lord: Guardian of the Galaxy; Guardians of the Galaxy Solo Classic Omnibus
#15 (Summer 1978)	"Star-Lord"		Star-Lord: Guardian of the Galaxy; Guardians of the Galaxy Solo Classic Omnibus
#16 (Fall 1978)	"Masters of Terror"	Lilith	Marvel Horror Lives Again! Omnibus
#17 (Winter 1979)	"Blackmark"		
#18 (Spring 1979)	"Star-Lord"		Star-Lord: Guardian of the Galaxy; Guardians of the Galaxy Solo Classic Omnibus
#19 (Summer 1979)	"Kull the Destroyer"	back-up: Solomon Kane	Kull: Savage Sword – The Original Marvel Years OmnibusSolomon Kane: The Original Marvel Years Omnibus (back-up)
#20 (Winter 1980)	"Bizarre Adventures"	reprints, including Dominic Fortune	
#21 (Spring 1980)	"Moon Knight"	back-up: the Shroud	Essential Moon Knight Vol. 1; Moon Knight Epic Collection Vol 1; Moon Knight Omnibus Vol 1
#22 (Summer 1980)	"Merlin"		
#23 (Fall 1980)	"Bizarre Adventures 2"		Marvel Universe by Frank Miller Omnibus (fourth story)
#24 (Winter 1980)	"Paradox"		

== Bizarre Adventures ==
Issue (cover date)	Feature	Notes	Collected Editions
#25 (March 1981)	"Lethal Ladies"	The Black Widow; Lady Daemon (debut); the Daughters of the Dragon	Black Widow: Web of Intrigue; Black Widow Epic Collection Vol 2; Black Widow Strikes Omnibus;Iron Fist: Deadly Hands of Kung Fu; Iron Fist: Danny Rand – The Early Years Omnibus;Deadly Hands of Kung Fu Omnibus Vol. 2
#26 (May 1981)	"Kull the Barbarian"	King Kull; "Demon in a Silvered Glass"—story by Doug Moench, art by John Bolton	The Savage Sword of Kull Vol. 1; Kull: Savage Sword – The Original Marvel Years Omnibus
#27 (July 1981)	"Secret Lives of the X-Men"	Phoenix; the Iceman; Nightcrawler	Uncanny X-Men Omnibus Vol 2; X-Men Epic Collection Vol 8;Phoenix Story: Phoenix Omnibus Iceman story: X-Men: Iceman; X-Men: Rareties (colorized)
#28 (October 1981)	"...These Are the Unlikely Heroes"	Elektra; the Shadow Hunter (debut); the Huntsman; Triton; and Bucky Bizarre (debut) Huntsman story was originally an issue for the then recently cancelled Logan's Run comic series	Elektra by Frank Miller Omnibus
#29 (December 1981)	"Stephen King's 'The Lawnmower Man'"	Adaptation of the Stephen King short story "The Lawnmower Man" by Walt Simonson; and stories starring Greenberg the Vampire (debut) and Bucky Bizarre	
#30 (February 1982)	"Paradox"	back ups: Silhouette; Bucky Bizarre	
#31 (April 1982)	"A Hard Look at Violence"	Dr. Deth with Kip and Muffy (debut); the Hangman I (Harlan Krueger; final appearance); Bucky Bizarre	Marvel Universe by John Byrne Omnibus
#32 (August 1982)	"Thor and Other Gods"	backups: the Aquarian; Bucky Bizarre	Thor Epic Collection Vol 12
#33 (December 1982)	"The Tomb of Dracula"; "Haunt of Horror"; "Tales of the Zombie"; "Vault of Evil"	Dracula; Varnae (debut); the Zombie	Marvel Horror Omnibus
#34 (February 1983)	"Special Hate the Holidays Issue"	Christmas-themed anthology issue, including the Son of Santa (debut and final appearance), Howard the Duck, Dr. Deth with Kip and Muffy (final appearance) and Bucky Bizarre (final appearance)	Howard the Duck Complete Collection Vol 4

== Collected editions ==
- Essential Punisher Vol. 1 includes the Punisher story from Marvel Preview #2, 568 pages, March 2004, ISBN 978-0785123750
- Dominic Fortune: It Can Happen Here and Now includes Dominic Fortune story from Marvel Preview #2, 184 pages, February 2010, ISBN 978-0785140429
- Blade: Black & White includes Blade the Vampire Slayer stories from Marvel Preview #3 and 6, 144 pages, December 2004, ISBN 978-0785114697
- Star-Lord: Guardian of the Galaxy includes Star-Lord stories from Marvel Preview #4, 11, 14-15, and 18, 424 pages, July 2014, ISBN 978-0785154495
- Essential Marvel Horror Vol. 1 includes Satana story from Marvel Preview #7, 648 pages, October 2006, ISBN 978-0785121961
- Rocket Raccoon: Guardian of the Keystone Quadrant includes Rocket Raccoon story from Marvel Preview #7, 120 pages, August 2011, ISBN 978-0785155270
- Essential Moon Knight Vol. 1 includes the Moon Knight story from Marvel Preview #21, 560 pages, February 2006, ISBN 978-0785120926
- Black Widow: Web of Intrigue includes the Black Widow story from Bizarre Adventures #25, 176 pages, April 2010, ISBN 978-0785144748
- Deadly Hands of Kung Fu Omnibus Vol. 2 includes the Daughters of the Dragon story from Bizarre Adventures #25, 1,000 pages, June 2017, ISBN 978-1302901349
- The Savage Sword of Kull Vol. 1 includes King Kull story from Bizarre Adventures #26, 448 pages, November 2010, ISBN 978-1595825933
- X-Men: Iceman includes the Iceman story from Bizarre Adventures #27, 120 pages, August 2012, ISBN 978-0785162759
- X-Men: The Dark Phoenix Saga includes Phoenix story from Bizarre Adventures #27, 200 pages, April 2012, ISBN 978-0785164210
- Elektra by Frank Miller Omnibus includes Elektra story from Bizarre Adventures #28, 384 pages, November 2008, ISBN 978-0785127772
- The Uncanny X-Men Omnibus Vol. 2 includes the Jean Grey, Iceman, and Nightcrawler stories from Bizarre Adventures #27, 912 pages, April 2014, 0785185720
