= Zombie (comics) =

Marvel Comics fictional character

- Tales of the Zombie #1 (August 1973); Art by Boris Vallejo

Publication information
- Publisher: Marvel Comics
- First appearance: Tales of the Zombie #1 (August 1973); Menace #5 (July 1953, retroactive)
- Created by: Atlas: Stan Lee; Bill Everett; Marvel: Roy Thomas; Steve Gerber; John Buscema; Tom Palmer

In-story information
- Alter ego: Simon William Garth
- Species: Zombie
- Team affiliations: Phil Coulson's Howling Commandos
- Abilities: Superhuman strength Magical healing

The Zombie (Simon William Garth) is a fictional supernatural character appearing in American comic books published by Marvel Comics. The character was created by writer Stan Lee and artist Bill Everett for the standalone story "Zombie" in the horror-anthology comic book Menace #5 (July 1953), which was published by Atlas Comics, a forerunner to Marvel. The character later became well known for starring in the black-and-white horror-comic magazine series Tales of the Zombie (1973–1975), usually in stories by Steve Gerber and Pablo Marcos.

== Publication history ==
Marvel Comics editor-in-chief Roy Thomas plucked the character Simon Garth, the Zombie, from a pre-Comics Code horror tale in Menace #5 (July 1953), published by Marvel forerunner Atlas Comics, and brought the character into modern-day continuity in Tales of the Zombie #1 (August 1973). The initial modern story, co-scripted by Thomas and Steve Gerber and drawn by John Buscema and Tom Palmer, was a 12-page tale that led into a seven-page reprint of the 1950s story (with the art slightly altered to give the Zombie shoulder-length rather than short hair). That original story was also reprinted in 1975's Tales of the Zombie Super Annual #1, and again two decades later in Curse of the Weird #4 (March 1994), the final issue of a short-lived Marvel horror reprint series.

Following the premiere, all the Zombie stories were by Gerber and artist Pablo Marcos (one of these in collaboration with writer Doug Moench and artist Alfredo Alcala). The original series' finale, set at Garth's daughter's wedding in issue #9, was a three-chapter story written by Tony Isabella (chapter 2 with co-scripter Chris Claremont), and drawn by pencilers Virgilio Redondo, Yong Montano, and Ron Wilson, respectively, and inked by Alcala (chapters 1–2) and Marcos (chapter 3).

Tales of the Zombie published the last work of Golden Age great Syd Shores, Captain America's first penciler following Jack Kirby's departure from the character in 1941. Shores had finished penciling two-thirds of the eight-page story "Voodoo War" for issue #5 (May 1974) before dying of a heart seizure. Dick Ayers penciled the remainder of writer Tony Isabella's anthological horror tale.

Although laid to peaceful rest in Tales of the Zombie #9 (he did not appear in the following, final issue, which contained a Brother Voodoo story and three anthological tales), Simon Garth was reanimated in the horror-comics magazine Bizarre Adventures #33 (Dec. 1982), in an out-of-chronology story hard to reconcile with the remainder of the character's continuity. The Zombie returned to color comic books in a backup story in Daredevil Annual #9 (July 1993). At the time of that appearance, the Zombie remained unearthed, and controlled by his daughter Donna, who pledged to have him eliminate other such enthralled undead.

Menace #5 (July 1953), cover art by Bill Everett.

The Zombie thereafter appeared in Peter Parker: Spider-Man Annual '97 (1997); in a behind-the-scenes reference in Blade: Crescent City Blues #1 (March 1998) leading into a guest appearance in Spider-Man Unlimited #20 (May 1998); and in a solo story in the anthology series Strange Tales (vol. 4) #1 (Sept. 1998). A decade later, he starred in a solo story in the one-shot omnibus Legion of Monsters: Man-Thing #1 (May 2007). He was also one of the main characters in Marvel Zombies 4.

He made an appearance in Marvel Zombie (October 2018).

== Fictional character biography ==
Simon William Garth was born in Birmingham, Alabama and became a work-obsessed executive of Garth Manor Coffee, based in New Orleans, Louisiana, United States. Ambushed and kidnapped by his former gardener (whom he had fired), Garth is to be a voodoo cult's human sacrifice; however, the cult's priestess Layla recognizes Garth as her own everyday-life employer, with whom she is in love. Though her attempt to let him escape is thwarted, and though she is forced to mystically transform his corpse into a zombie with a clouded mind, under the control of whoever holds the matching Amulet of Damballah worn by Garth, Layla and her grandfather, Papa Doc Kabel, continue to try to help the uncomprehending Zombie reach his final rest.

Despite his zombie state, he retains some vestige of his soul: for instance, when under the control of the Amulet, he has been forced to hurt or even kill people he has come to care about (such as Philip Bliss and Layla). The moment he is free from control, his vengeance is terrible. Because of these remnants of soul, Layla and Papa Doc perform a ritual that allows Garth 24 hours in his restored human form in order that he might attend the wedding of his daughter Donna and set in order what was left of his previous life.

He was resurrected by the voodoo witch Calypso who discovered that, through acts of selflessness, this particular zombie possessed free will, i.e. the ability to act of his own accord and not always at the request of whoever was wearing the Amulet of Damballah — an unusual feature for a member of the walking dead. In this case, he ignored her orders and pushed Calypso aside in order to release the captive soul of his friend Papa Doc Kabel, whom Calypso had murdered as part of the process of reviving Garth.

=== Marvel Zombies 4 ===
Simon Garth had been a test subject of A.R.M.O.R. when the zombie plague killed everyone on the base. He retrieved the head of zombie Deadpool, and used the base's teleporters to escape to the bottom of the sea, where Deadpool's head infected all of the Men-Fish and their leader, the Piranha. Garth was compelled to travel to the island nation of Taino in the Caribbean Sea, where he told Black Talon about the zombie plague. Black Talon assumed control of Garth, and captured Deadpool's head. When the zombie Deadpool's head bites one of the Black Talon's henchmen, he uses this opportunity to get Garth to help him escape. At the end of the series, Jennifer Kale and the Black Talon confine the zombie virus inside Garth.

The Zombie was later recruited by Phil Coulson to join his incarnation of the Howling Commandos in order to fight Dormammu's Mindless Plague.

== Powers and abilities ==
As the Zombie, Garth is supernaturally strong and able to heal mystically from injuries; however, he is also virtually mindless. Also, due to the Amulet of Damballah, which he wears around his neck, he must obey anyone who holds that item's duplicate.

== Other versions ==
A revamped version of the Zombie appeared in a new continuity in Marvel's mature-readers MAX imprint, in the four-issue miniseries Zombie (Nov. 2006 - Feb. 2007), written by Mike Raicht and illustrated by Kyle Hotz. Here, Simon Garth is a bank teller who, with his co-worker Layla, becomes tangled in the affairs of two robbers and an infectious zombifying gas. Simon plants paint bombs in the money bags that only he can defuse, so he and Layla are kidnapped and accidentally brought into the zombie quarantine zone, thinking that the barriers were to stop the robbers from escaping rather than to keep the undead in check. The series concludes with a bitten and bullet-riddled Simon, the only survivor of the outbreak, being taken into the custody of the military and extracted from the scene via helicopter.

Zombie was followed by a second four-issue miniseries, The Zombie: Simon Garth with Eric Powell replacing Reicht (with the cover of the first issue paying homage to the cover art of the first issue of Tales of the Zombie), which chronicles the events following the extraction, and Simon's escapades as a "heroic" zombie.

== Other Zombies ==
Other characters known as Zombie in the Marvel Universe include:

- Otherdimensional counterparts of Marvel's superheroes, supervillains and others in the various Marvel Zombies series.
- In Tales of the Zombie #4, a zombie of ancient Egypt appeared. The person died violently under unknown circumstances and was reanimated as a zombie by an unidentified man by calling upon Anubis and Ereshkigal. The man had him force a woman to marry him, but the woman eventually learned how to control the zombie and she had it slay the man.
- A new Zombie, whose true identity is never revealed and is known only as John Doe, is a member of S.H.I.E.L.D.'s Paranormal Containment Unit. His only appearances occurred in the 2005–2006 series Nick Fury's Howling Commandos.
- A giant of unknown origin was known as the Zombie Master; he used a machine to transform others into a zombie-like state. His machine instead empowered Dr. Jack Castle, who defeated him and became the Fiery Mask. He was also known as the Master and appeared in Daring Mystery Comics #1.

== Reception ==
Simon Garth, the Zombie was ranked #19 on a listing of Marvel Comics' best monster characters in 2015.

== Collected editions ==
Some of the stories have been collected into trade paperbacks:

- Essential Tales of the Zombie: Volume 1 (collects Tales of the Zombie #1-10 and Dracula Lives #1-2, 592 pages, October 2006, ISBN 0-7851-1916-7)
- Marvel Masterworks: Atlas Era – Menace Volume 1 (includes Menace #5, 304 pages, November 2009, ISBN 0-7851-3509-X)
- Marvel MAX:
  - Zombie (collects Zombie #1-4, 96 pages, April 2007, ISBN 0-7851-1913-2)
  - The Zombie: Simon Garth (collects The Zombie: Simon Garth #1-4, 96 pages, July 2008, ISBN 0-7851-2751-8)
