= Pablo Marcos =

Peruvian comic book artist and commercial illustrator

- Born: March 31, 1937 (age 89) Laran, Chincha Alta, Peru
- Areas: Penciller, inker

Pablo Marcos Ortega, known professionally as Pablo Marcos (born March 31, 1937), is a comic book artist and commercial illustrator best known as one of his home country Peru's leading cartoonists, and for his work on such popular American comics characters as Batman and Conan the Barbarian, particularly during the 1970s. His signature character was Marvel Comics' the Zombie, for which Marcos drew all but one story in the black-and-white horror-comics magazine Tales of the Zombie (1973–1975).

== Early life ==
James Bond 007 Peruvian comic-strip panel by Marcos, 1960s

Pablo Marcos was born in the small town of Laran, Chincha Alta, Peru, and moved with his family to the capital, Lima, at age five. His parents, Pablo (a taxi and gasoline-truck driver) and Maria Ortega Marcos, had four children at the time: Gloria, Berta, Pablo, and Manuel, later to be joined by Alfredo (who would become a cartoonist and caricaturist in Peru as an adult) and Oswaldo. While at the Bartolomé Herrera high school, Marcos studied under teacher and artist Juan Rivera Saavedra, who introduced him to the works of Argentine, Chilean, Italian and American comics artists such as Alberto Breccia, Arturo del Castillo, Hal Foster, Burne Hogarth, Hugo Pratt, Alex Raymond and Jose Luis Sallinas, among others.

== Career ==
Political cartoonist Julio Fairle had Marcos fill-in for him with spot illustrations in the influential Latin American newspaper La Prensa, which led to more newspaper work. Marcos later contributed caricatures to such weekly political magazines as Rochabus and Zamba Canuta while still an economics major at Peru's University of Lima.

During the 1960s, Marcos drew such comic strips as Benito Puma and James Bond 007 in Peruvian newspapers. He became art director of the newspaper Expreso, working as well on its evening edition, Extra, and a weekly supplement, Estampa. Marcos became nationally known in 1965, following his illustrations for the trial and execution by firing squad of a convicted rapist. This wider recognition led to advertising artwork and high-profile political, news, and sports illustration. He began freelancing for the Mexican publishing company Editorial Novaro and in 1968 moved with his family to Mexico. Marcos was responsible of Hata-Yoga a comic of mystic flavor where the superior mind could solve important problems. Pable Marcos, recognized as an artist also collaborate in several other comics of editorial Novaro.

=== American comics ===
Marcos moved to New Jersey in the U.S. in the 1970s. Warren Publishing art director Billy Graham assigned him his first American-comics work, penciling and inking the six-page story "The Water World", by writer Jake Saunders, in Warren's black-and-white horror-comics magazine Creepy #39 (May 1971). After another Creepy story and one in companion magazine Eerie that year, Marcos drew comics exclusively for rival Skywald Publications' Nightmare and Psycho from May 1972 to May 1973 cover-dates. Skywald co-founder Sol Brodsky introduced Marcos to fellow Peruvian artist Boris Vallejo, who became a mentor.

Giant-Size Dracula #2 (Sept. 1974), cover-artist Marcos' first American color comics work

When Brodsky, who had been Marvel Comics' production manager, left Skywald to return to Marvel, he brought Marcos along as an artist and later his staff assistant for roughly two months. Marcos began drawing covers for such Marvel UK titles featuring such characters and features as Captain Britain, "Planet of the Apes", and Dracula. Marcos' naturalistic, "illustrative" style, similar to that of Neal Adams, became a mainstay of Marvel's black-and-white horror-comics magazines Dracula Lives!, Monsters Unleashed, Tales of the Zombie, Vampire Tales and others, and the exposure afforded by industry leader Marvel made Marcos a popular artist of the 1970s.

His first color-comics work in the U.S. was the cover of Marvel's Giant-Size Dracula #2 (Sept. 1974). Marcos' color-comics interior-art debut came at publisher Martin Goodman's short-lived Atlas/Seaboard Comics, illustrating the sword-and-sorcery title Iron Jaw #3 (May 1975). He went on to draw the following issue, plus the Iron Jaw story in Barbarians #1 and the cover of The Brute #3 (both July 1975) before the company folded.

Marcos next freelanced for DC Comics, drawing Man-Bat stories in Detective Comics, and working on an issue or two each of series including Freedom Fighters, Kamandi, Kobra, Secret Society of Super-Villains, and Teen Titans before returning to Marvel to do art for issues of The Avengers, The Mighty Thor and other comics. In 1980, Marcos additionally freelanced for an Italian comic-book series, Tremila Dollari per Ebenezer Cross Western Story, and created the series "Dragon" for the Mexican magazine Ejea.

By the early 1980s, Marcos was at work at what would become one of his signature characters, inking penciler John Buscema on Conan the Barbarian comic books, the black-and-white magazine The Savage Sword of Conan, and the newspaper comic strip. Marcos reduced his workload in September 1985 in order to tend to his severely ill wife.

Marcos later illustrated a long run of DC's TV tie-in series Star Trek: The Next Generation through the early 1990s, and again from 1993–1994. His last known comics penciling for several years was the 14-page painted story "Om", scripted by Ron Fortier from a Marcos plot, in Quantum Cat Entertainment's Frank Frazetta Fantasy Illustrated #7 (July 1999). He returned as an inker two years later on a handful of issues of CrossGen's Ruse, Mystic, Crux, and Silken Ghost through 2003, and once again did penciling from 2006 to 2008, on comics including Dynamite Entertainment's Red Sonja and Savage Tales.

== Other work ==
In the 1990s and 2000s, the Pablo Marcos Studio illustrated many books in Waldman Publishing's Great Illustrated Classics series of young-adult adaptations of such novels as Gulliver's Travels, The Wizard of Oz, The Invisible Man, The Legend of Sleepy Hollow and Rip Van Winkle, Jane Eyre, The Jungle Book, King Solomon's Mines, A Little Princess, and The Three Musketeers. His studio similarly illustrated Baronet's "Heroes of America: Illustrated Lives" series, including Heidi, Clara Barton and the American Red Cross and Babe Ruth.

== Personal life ==
Marcos married Norma Martinez in 1960, and the couple had a child, Judith, that same year. Their second child, daughter Gisella, was born in 1963, and their third, a daughter named Norma like her mother, in 1967. The following year, the Marcos family, including newborn son Pablo, moved to Mexico. In the 1970s, the family relocated again, to New Jersey in the United States. Marcos reduced his workload in September 1985 in order to tend to his severely ill wife, a patient at New York University Medical Center, who died in November 1985. Marcos later married artist Myriam Giraldo.

== Awards and nominations ==
In 2021 he was awarded the Inkwell Awards Joe Sinnott Hall of Fame Award.
