= Dracula Lives! =

American black-and-white horror comics magazine

- Dracula Lives! #1 (June 1973), art by Boris Vallejo

Publication information
- Publisher: Magazine Management
- Schedule: quarterly
- Format: Ongoing series
- Genre: Horror
- Publication date: June 1973 – July 1975
- No. of issues: 13, plus one Super Annual
- Main character(s): Dracula

Creative team
- Written by: Roy Thomas, Doug Moench, Steve Gerber, Gardner Fox
- Artist(s): Dick Giordano, John Buscema, Pablo Marcos, Gene Colan, Rich Buckler, Tony DeZuniga, Alan Weiss, Tony DiPreta
- Penciller(s): Jim Starlin, Bob Brown, George Tuska
- Inker(s): Syd Shores, Alfredo Alcala, Crusty Bunkers
- Editor(s): Roy Thomas (issues #1–7); Marv Wolfman (issues #3, 8–13)

Collected editions
- Tomb of Dracula: ISBN 0-7851-1709-1
- Tomb of Dracula Volume 3: ISBN 0-7851-3578-2

Dracula Lives! was an American black-and-white horror comics magazine published by Magazine Management, a corporate sibling of Marvel Comics. The series ran 13 issues and one Super Annual from 1973 to 1975, and starred the Marvel version of the literary vampire Dracula.

A magazine rather than a comic book, it did not fall under the purview of the comics industry's self-censorship Comics Code Authority, allowing the title to feature stronger content — such as moderate profanity, partial nudity, and more graphic violence — than the color comics of the time which also featured Dracula stories.

Running concurrently with the longer-running Marvel comic The Tomb of Dracula, the continuities of the two titles occasionally overlapped, with storylines weaving between the two. Most of the time, however, the stories in Dracula Lives! were standalone Dracula tales by various creative teams. Later issues of Dracula Lives! featured a serialized adaptation of the original Bram Stoker novel, written by Roy Thomas and drawn by Dick Giordano.

== Publication history ==
Copyrighted as simply Dracula Lives, without an exclamation point, but commonly known by its trademarked cover title, Dracula Lives!, the magazine ran 13 issues from 1973 to 1975. With sister titles including Monsters Unleashed!, Tales of the Zombie and Vampire Tales, it was published by Marvel Comics' parent company, Magazine Management, and related corporations, under the brand emblem Marvel Monster Group.

The character Lianda first appeared in Dracula Lives! #1. The character Turac first appeared in Dracula Lives! #2 (Sept. 1973). The character Nimrod the First debuted in Dracula Lives! #3 (Oct. 1973), created by Marv Wolfman and John Buscema.

Painted covers of the series were done by artists including Boris Vallejo, Neal Adams, and Luis Dominguez. Text and photo articles were mostly of the Count's various film appearances. The title of the magazine's letter column was "Dracula Reads!"

An annual publication titled Dracula Lives! Super Annual was published in 1975, reprinting stories from the magazine.

=== Reprints and collections ===
Some of the material in Dracula Lives! was reprinted in the Marvel UK weekly reprint title of the same name (but without the exclamation mark), but most of the Dracula material in the British periodical came from the monthly Tomb of Dracula comic. The UK Dracula Lives eventually merged with the Marvel UK Planet of the Apes weekly. From issue #60 until #87 (its final edition) the title became Dracula Lives Featuring the Legion of Monsters.

All 13 issues of Dracula Lives! were collected for an Essential Marvel edition in 2005 (Dracula Lives! #1-2 was also collected in 2006 as part of Essential Tales of the Zombie: Volume 1). In 2010, the complete series (including the letter columns) was reprinted in the Marvel Omnibus title Tomb of Dracula Volume 3 (which included The Tomb of Dracula magazine #1-6 and The Frankenstein Monster #7-9).

== Serialized adaptation of Stoker's Dracula ==
Issues #5–8 and 10–11 featured a serialized adaptation of the original Bram Stoker novel, in 10- to 12-page installments written by Roy Thomas and drawn by Dick Giordano.

Following Dracula Lives! cancellation, an additional installment appeared in The Legion of Monsters #1, for a total of 76 pages comprising roughly one-third of the novel. After a 30-year hiatus, Marvel commissioned Thomas and Giordano to finish the adaptation, and ran the reprinted and new material as the four-issue miniseries Stoker's Dracula (Oct. 2004 – May 2005). The entire adaptation was collected by Marvel Illustrated in 2010.
