= Savage Tales =

Three different American comics series

- Savage Tales #1 (May 1971), cover art by John Buscema.

Publication information
- Publisher: Marvel Comics
- Schedule: Bi-monthly
- Format: Ongoing series
- Publication date: May 1971 – July 1975
- No. of issues: 11 and one annual
- Main character: List: Conan Ka-Zar

Creative team
- Written by: List: Roy Thomas Gerry Conway Doug Moench
- Penciller: List: Barry Smith John Romita Sr Gray Morrow Bernie Wrightson Gil Kane Neal Adams Jim Starlin John Buscema Steve Gan
- Inker: List: Pablo Marcos Al Milgrom Tony DeZuniga

Savage Tales is the title of three American comics series. Two were black-and-white comics-magazine anthologies published by Marvel Comics, and the other a color comic book anthology published by Dynamite Entertainment.

== Publication history ==
=== Marvel ===
The first of the two volumes of Savage Tales ran 11 issues, with a nearly 2 1/2-year hiatus after the premiere issue (May 1971, then Oct. 1973 - July 1975). It marked Marvel's second attempt at entering the comics-magazine field dominated by Warren Publishing (Creepy, Eerie, Vampirella), following the two-issue superhero entry The Spectacular Spider-Man in 1968. Starring in the first issue were:

- Robert E. Howard's sword and sorcery pulp-fiction character Conan the Barbarian, adapted by writer Roy Thomas and artist Barry Windsor-Smith (as Barry Smith)
- the futuristic, Amazon-like Femizons, by writer-editor Stan Lee and artist John Romita
- the first-ever appearance of the swamp creature Man-Thing, plotted by Lee and Thomas, scripted by Gerry Conway and drawn by Gray Morrow
- the African inner-city defender Joshua, in the feature "Black Brother" by Dennis O'Neil (under the pseudonym Sergius O'Shaughnessy) and penciler Gene Colan
- the jungle lord Ka-Zar, by Lee and artist John Buscema.

Thomas, who would shortly thereafter become Marvel editor-in-chief, recalled in 2008 that:

...there were several things that led to Savage Tales being cancelled after that first issue. [Publisher] Martin Goodman had never really wanted to do a non-[Comics] Code comic [i.e., not bearing the Comics Code Authority's parental seal of approval, essentially required on mainstream color comics of the time], probably because he didn't want any trouble with the [Code administrator, the Comics Magazine Association of America] over it. Nor did he really want to get into magazine-format comics; and [Marvel editor-in-chief] Stan [Lee] really did. So Goodman looked for an excuse to cancel it.

When the magazine eventually began publishing again years later (after Goodman had left the company) in the wake of a Conan-inspired sword-and-sorcery trend in comics, it starred the likes of Conan; fellow Robert E. Howard hero Kull of Atlantis; and John Jakes' barbarian creation, Brak. As of issue #6, the magazine cover-featured Ka-Zar.

The series featured painted covers by artists John Buscema (#1–2), Pablo Marcos & John Romita (#3), Neal Adams (#4–6), Boris Vallejo (#7, #10), Stephen Fabian (#8), Michael Kaluta (#9), and Michael Whelan (#11). A 1975 annual, consisting entirely of reprints, mostly from Ka-Zar's color-comics series, sported a new cover by Ken Barr.

Volume 2 ran eight issues (Oct 1985 – Dec. 1986), edited by Larry Hama. It featured adventure and action stories with a military fiction slant. Stories in the first and fourth issues, a feature called "5th to the 1st" by writer Doug Murray and artist Michael Golden, were the forerunners of the duo's color-comics series The 'Nam. A third installment of "5th to the 1st", initially unused due to the cancellation of Savage Tales, was published in The 'Nam #8.

=== Dynamite Entertainment ===
In 2007, American publisher Dynamite Entertainment started a new Savage Tales, a color comic book sword and sorcery anthology starring the character Red Sonja.
