= Monsters Unleashed (comics) =

Marvel Comics series

Monsters Unleashed is the title of an American black-and-white comics magazine published by Magazine Management and two color comic-book miniseries from Marvel Comics. The first ran from 1973 to 1975. The two miniseries ran consecutively in 2017.

== Magazine Management (1973–1975) ==
Monsters Unleashed
- Monsters Unleashed #1 (1973). Cover art by Gray Morrow.

Publication information
- Publisher: Marvel Comics Group
- Schedule: Quarterly
- Format: Ongoing series
- Genre: Horror
- Publication date: August 1973 – April 1975
- No. of issues: 11, and one annual publication
- Editor(s): Roy Thomas, Tony Isabella, Don McGregor

The first publication titled Monsters Unleashed was an American black-and-white horror comics magazine published by Magazine Management, a corporate sibling of Marvel Comics. The series ran 11 issues cover-dated 1973 to April 1975), plus one annual publication. With sister titles including Dracula Lives!, Tales of the Zombie and Vampire Tales, it was published by Marvel Comics' parent company, Magazine Management, and related corporations, under the brand emblem Marvel Monster Group. The first issue was dated simply 1973, but the second issue of the magazine, published quarterly, was cover-dated September 1973.

A magazine rather than a comic book, it did not fall under the purview of the comics industry's self-censorship Comics Code Authority, allowing the title to feature stronger content — such as moderate profanity, partial nudity, and more graphic violence — than color comics of the time.

Monsters Unleashed primarily featured standalone horror stories, both original and reprinted, including from pre-Comics Code comics from Marvel Comics' 1950s iteration, Atlas Comics. It occasionally featured stories starring the Marvel Comics swamp monster Man-Thing, the Marvel version of the Frankenstein monster, the bestial Wendigo, the science-fiction adventurer Gullivar Jones. and the superheroine Tigra. It also included text features on monster movies.

Monsters Unleashed was edited by Roy Thomas for the first six issues, succeeded by Tony Isabella, and then Don McGregor for the last two issues. The painted covers were illustrated by the likes of Gray Morrow, Boris Vallejo, Neal Adams, Frank Brunner, Bob Larkin, Richard Hescox, Earl Norem, and Jose Antonio Domingo. In addition to the 11 issues there was one annual publication in 1975 consisting completely of stories reprinted from the magazine.

== Marvel Comics (2017) ==
Monsters Unleashed

Publication information
- Publisher: Marvel Comics
- Format: Limited series
- Publication date: March – May 2017
- No. of issues: 5
- Main characters: Avengers; Champions; Moon Girl and Devil Dinosaur; Elsa Bloodstone; Goliathons; Guardians of the Galaxy; Inhumans; Kei Kawade; Leviathon Tide; X-Men

Creative team
- Created by: Cullen Bunn; Steve McNiven; Greg Land; Adam Kubert; Leinil Francis Yu

=== Volume two ===
The second volume of Monsters Unleashed is a Marvel Comics series published in 2017. It is the flagship title of the "Monster Unleashed" company-wide crossover story arc. Additionally, a tie-in trade paperback book, Monsters Unleashed Prelude, reprinted late 1950s and early 1960s "pre-superhero Marvel" stories starring several of the giant monsters seen in the new series.

Monsters Unleashed volume two began publication in January 2017. The five-issue miniseries was cover-date March–May 2017.

=== Synopsis ===
Monsters have been appearing on Earth upon falling from the sky. The Avengers fight a reptilian monster in Boston, the X-Men fight a spider monster in London, the Black Panther and Shuri defend Wakanda from a thick-skinned monster, the Guardians of the Galaxy defend Groot from a snake-like monster in Seattle, the Inhumans fight a multi-headed monster in Venice, and the Champions fight a tentacled eye monster in Los Angeles. In Peru, Elsa Bloodstone finds a prophecy that tells of the Monster King, whom all monsters fear. The Winter Guard fights monsters in Moscow while Valkyrie and Warrior Woman fight them in Edinburgh while Atlas fights them in Washington, D.C. Medusa and Karnak discover that Kei Kawade is an Inhuman who can summon monsters called Goliathons to help fight the Leviathon invasion. Kei learns how to use his powers and manages to defeat the Leviathon Queen with a team of new monsters.

=== Titles involved ===
- Monsters Unleashed vol. 2, #1–5
- All-New X-Men vol. 2 #1.MU
- Avengers vol. 7 #1.MU
- Champions vol. 2 #1.MU
- Doctor Strange vol. 4 #1.MU
- Guardians of the Galaxy vol. 4 #1.MU
- Spider-Man/Deadpool #1.MU
- Totally Awesome Hulk #1.MU
- Uncanny Inhumans #1.MU
- Marvel Free Previews: Monsters Unleashed! #1

=== Volume three ===
The third volume of Monsters Unleashed is a twelve-issue Marvel Comics miniseries cover-dated June-Oct. 2017. It follows Kei Kawade, Elsa Bloodstone, Kei Kawade's creations Aegish, Slizzik, Scragg, Hi Vo and Mekara, and the latest incarnation of Intelligencia.

=== Critical reception ===
The entire crossover received mixed reviews. According to Comic Book Roundup, the entire crossover received an average rating of 6.9 out of 10 based on 48 reviews.

== Collected editions ==
Title	Material collected	Published date	ISBN
Monsters Unleashed Prelude	Fearless Defenders #8; Marvel Zombies (vol. 2) #1; Moon Girl and Devil Dinosaur #1; Totally Awesome Hulk #2-3 and material from Strange Tales #73, 90; Tales to Astonish #11-13, 15, 17, 19, 23; Tales of Suspense #15, 17, 19, 22	January 2017	978-1302900892
Monsters Unleashed	Monsters Unleashed (vol. 2) #1-5	July 2017	978-1302907266
Monsters Unleashed Vol. 1: Monster Mash	Monsters Unleashed (vol. 3) #1-6	December 2017	978-0785196365
Monsters Unleashed Vol. 2: Learning Curve	Monsters Unleashed (vol. 3) #7-12	June 2018	978-0785196372
Monsters Unleashed: Battleground	All-New X-Men #1.MU, Avengers #1.MU, Champions #1.MU, Doctor Strange #1.MU, Guardians of the Galaxy #1.MU, Spider-Man/Deadpool #1.MU, Totally Awesome Hulk #1.MU, Uncanny Inhumans #1.MU	July 2017	978-1302907198
