= Styles and themes of Robert E. Howard =

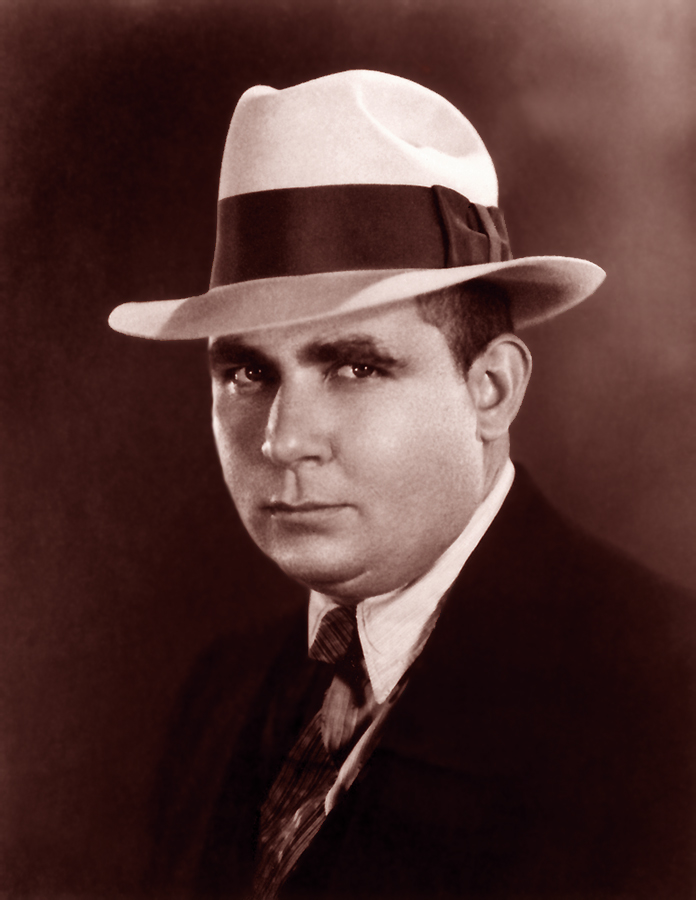
Robert E. Howard in 1934

The distinctive literary styles and themes of Robert E. Howard rely on a combination of many factors. In his fiction, he used devices borrowed from classical and traditional works, as well as formal rhetoric. In his poetry, he used rhythm, stress, and intonation to achieve a sense of motion. Some of his fiction has been described as prose poetry. His works can be distinguished by his use of violence and hate as positive forces in his universe, which can be seen as a part of the American Myth. In keeping with the era in which he worked, a grim and hardboiled theme pervades. The continuing cycle of civilisation and barbarism is highlighted in several works. Although he died before it was formally defined, an existentialism subtext runs through his writing. He was an aesthete and had affinity for romanticism and neo-romanticism, although in this he was out of step with his era.

== Styles ==
=== Language and word use ===
Outside, the moan of the tortured thousands shuddered up to the stars which crusted the sweating Vendhyan night, and the conchs bellowed like oxen in pain.

In the gardens of the palace the torches glinted on polished helmets and curved swords and gold-chased corselets. All the noble-born fighting-men of Ayodhya were gathered in the great palace or about it, and at each broad-arched gate and door fifty archers stood on guard, with bows in their hands. But Death stalked through the royal palace and none could stay his ghostly tread.

On the dais under the golden dome the king cried out again, racked by awful paroxysms. Again his voice came faintly and far away, and again the Devi bent to him, trembling with a fear that was darker than the terror of death.

— Robert E. Howard, "The People of the Black Circle" (1934)

Howard used an economy of words to sketch out scenes in his stories; his ability to do so has been attributed to his skill with, and experience of, both tall tales and poetry. Howard's stories have a sense of authenticity and a natural deft use of language due to his investment in the narrative. The trait is considered the mark of a master in oral storytelling. Some of his stories, such as "The Mirrors of Tuzun Thune", have been described as prose poems in their vigorous and rhythmic writing. Howard's tall tale background is the source of the rhythm, drive and authenticity of his work.

Howard's writing frequently uses hypermodification, where most nouns and most verbs are modified. Sometimes a single word can have multiple modifiers. For example, in the line "the saw-edged crescent blade of the Yuetshi", the noun "blade" is modified with both "crescent" and "saw-edged". Howard would use both compound modification (i.e. A and B) or serial modification (i.e. A, B, C). In addition to liberal use of adjectives and adverbs, he would use nominal compounds and compound verbs. Coffman writes that this is something that "in most writers, is a flaw, but which Robert E. Howard gets away with beautifully."

Howard occasionally included descriptive details as lists; the rapid succession adding to the pace of the prose. For example, "Flat, flaring nostrils, retreating chin, fangs, no forehead whatever, great, immensely long arms dangling from sloping, incredible shoulders".

His writing attempts to match the reading pace with the pace of the story, so his language is as packed as the action being depicted. In addition to the action packing of the plot (compound, modified and multi-modified verbs), descriptive passages are similarly packed with detail. Stephen King wrote that "[i]n his best work, Howard's writing seems so highly charged with energy that it nearly gives off sparks. Stories such as "The People of the Black Circle" glow with the fierce and eldritch light of his frenzied intensity."

Frequently a description is echoed or repeated, with subtle differences, throughout one of Howard's works, building a vivid descriptive resonance. For example, Xapur in the Conan story "The Devil in Iron" is variously described with the phrases "castellated", "some ancient ruins upon it", "rises sheer out of the sea", and "castle-like cliffs".

=== Traditional devices ===
Howard incorporated elements of existing narrative traditions in his writing. As well as frequent use of standard similes, he used Homeric similes, or elaborate and detailed comparisons. For example: "As a panther strikes down a bull moose at bay, so he plunged under the bludgeoning arms and drove the crescent blade to the hilt under the spot where a human's heart would be." Another element borrowed from the classical tradition is the use of epithets; the most obvious of these is "The Cimmerian" when referring to his most famous character, Conan.

He often made use of flyting, boastful and taunting dialogue preparatory to a physical fight; a device probably borrowed from Shakespeare. For example: "'Dog!' he taunted. 'You can't hit me! I was not born to die on Hyrkanian steel! Try again, pig of Turan!'" Howard's best short stories have been compared to Elizabethan plays and poems, in the sense of the strength of the narrative, the striking imagery and the sense of a larger context than man's own immediate environment. Fritz Leiber compares, "without over-praise", Howard's "The People of the Black Circle" to the plays of Christopher Marlowe and John Webster.

=== Rhetorical devices ===
Howard had a grounding in rhetorical techniques, either through self-study or formal schooling, that he used in his writing.

A favourite device was the tricolon, a sentence with three clearly defined parts. This was often used in combination with asyndeton and polysyndeton, in which conjunctions are either removed entirely or repeated in close succession. For example, the line "fold after slimy fold knotting about him, twisting, crushing, killing him," is, in the highlighted text, an asyndetic tricolon. While the following line, "then it fell, shearing through the scales, and flesh, and vertebrae," is a polysyndetic tricolon.

The devices alliteration, assonance and consonance are also common in Howard's works. This refers to the repetition of sounds in a series of words.

Example
Sentence	Alliteration
"It was forged of a meteor that flashed through the sky like a flaming arrow and fell in a far valley."	F sounds & L sounds

=== Story structure ===
Howard's stories usually have action openings rather than exposition. They often include some characterisation, sometimes of secondary characters.

Howard's plots are frequently constructed from interlaced plot strands, shifting between the locations and perspectives of different groups and characters.

=== Meter ===
The meter used by Howard in his poetry creates a sense of motion. His most commonly used foot is the Trochee, a stressed syllable followed by an unstressed syllable that gives a sense of increased speed but can also evoke sadness. Less used but still favoured by Howard were the Anapaest, two unstressed syllables followed by a stressed syllable, and its inverse the Dactyl. These feet echo galloping hooves, rolling oceans and thundering winds. His lines are usually end-stopped rather than run-on, enjambments which further add to the sense of dynamism.

Howard himself was critical of his own poetry and understanding of prosody, writing in a 1931 letter to H. P. Lovecraft: "I know nothing of the mechanics of poetry—I couldn't tell you if a line was anapestic or trochaic to save my neck. I write the stuff by ear, so to speak, and my musical ear is very full of flaws." Nevertheless, the rhythm, stress, and intonation are present in his works, regardless of his knowledge of the correct nomenclature.

=== Hate and violence ===
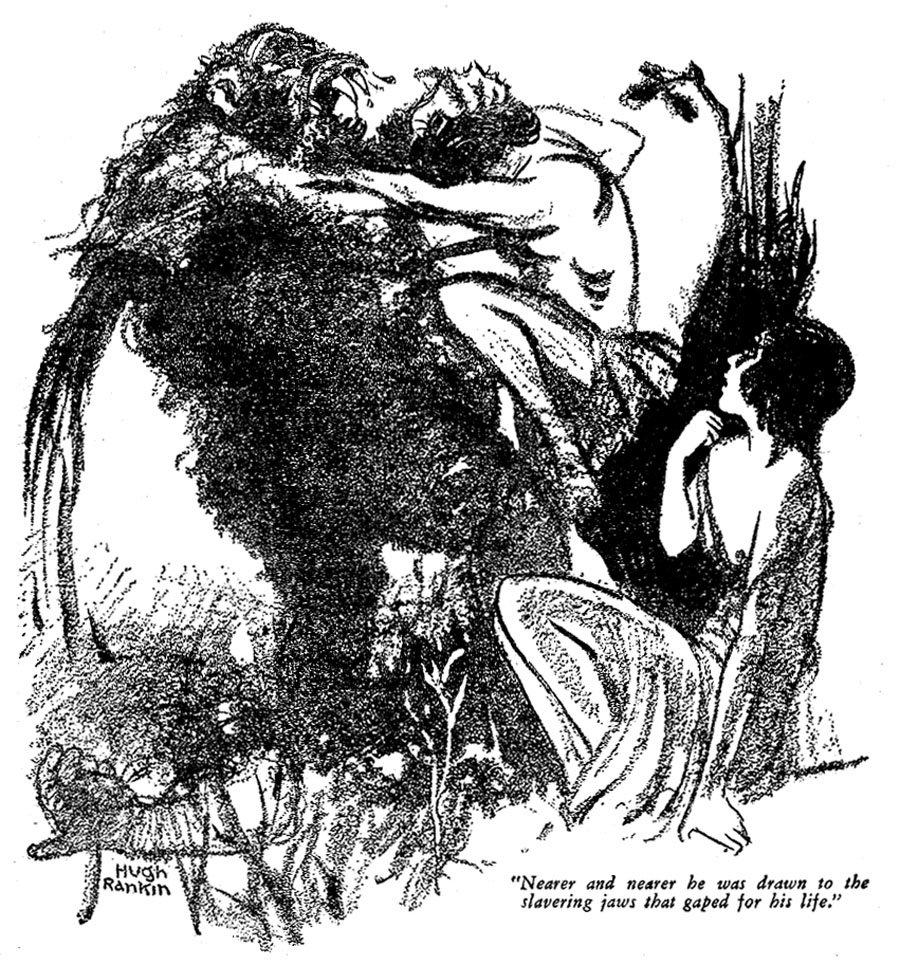
Conan fighting an ape from "Shadows in the Moonlight" (1934)

In the introduction to Skull-Face and Others (1945) editor August Derleth wrote "In the tales concerning Solomon Kane, Bran Mak Morn, King Kull, and Conan, there is quite possibly more blood-letting and more lusty carnage than in any other group of stories which appeared in pulp magazines in America during the 1930s. There have come to Arkham House frequent requests for a collection of all the Conan stories; such a collection would almost have to be printed on blood-coloured paper."

Richard Slotkin wrote about the American national myth in his books Regeneration Through Violence (1973), The Fatal Environment (1985) and Gunfighter Nation (1992). This myth includes the tenet that the violence involved in taming the nation was not only good but a renewing, regenerative act.

Many of the books in Howard's collection were about the subject of the American frontier and he wrote, in a 1933 letter to Derleth, that for him, "frontier days were yesterday." Even Howard's non-Western stories nevertheless draw heavily on the traditions and style of Western fiction. Sam Lundwall wrote in Science Fiction: What It's All About (1971) that Howard's fiction was "a kind of Wild West in the never-never lands of unbridled fantasy."

Howard's work often features "dark anthropomorphism", the attributing of not only sentience but malevolence to non-humans and inanimate objects. Any obstacle for the protagonists is not just an impediment but an enemy that hates and must be hated in return.

As a person, Howard considered violence as not only one of the greatest thrills in life but something that gave meaning to life, by struggling to survive and pitting himself against another. In a 1932 letter to H. P. Lovecraft, Howard described a boxing match that was the greatest moment of his life:

Looking back over a none-too-lengthy and prosaic life, I can easily pick out what seemed—and still seems—the peak of my life to date; that is, the point at which I derived the highest thrills—a word which my limited vocabulary causes me to overwork... when I look for the peak of my exultation, I find it on a sweltering, breathless midnight when I fought a black-haired tiger of an Oklahoma drifter in an abandoned ice-vault, in a stifling atmosphere laden with tobacco smoke and the reek of sweat and rot-gut whiskey—and blood; with a gang of cursing, blaspheming oil-field roughnecks for an audience. Even now, the memory of that battle stirs the sluggish blood in my fat-laden tissues. There was nothing about it calculated to advance art, science of anything else. It was a bloody, brutal merciless brawl. We fought for fully an hour—until neither of us could fight for any longer, and we reeled against each other, gasping incoherent curses through battered lips. There was not even an excuse for it. We were fighting, not because there was a quarrel between us, but simply to see who was the best man. Yet I repeat that I get more real pleasure out of remembering that fight than I could possibly get out of contemplating the greatest work of art ever accomplished, or seeing the greatest drama ever enacted, or hearing the greatest song ever sung.

— Robert E. Howard, Letter to H. P. Lovecraft (September 22, 1932)

=== Grimness and realism ===
The tone of Howard's works, especially in the Conan stories, is hardboiled, dark and realistic. This is contrasted with the fantastic elements contained within the stories. Howard did for fantasy fiction what Dashiell Hammett did for crime fiction. Both were writing in the same era, when the United States and the world were in upheaval; both were writing for the readers of pulp magazines; both Americanized their respective genres and brought them up to date.

=== Burlesque humor ===
Howard's sense of humor is shown most vividly in the Sailor Steve Costigan and Breckenridge Elkins stories. These stories of burlesque and slapstick lampooned his own perceived character and flaws: impulsiveness, gullibility, fondness of food and drink, loyalty and politeness.

== Themes ==
=== Civilization and barbarism ===
"Barbarism is the natural state of mankind," the borderer said, still staring somberly at the Cimmerian. "Civilization is unnatural. It is a whim of circumstance. And barbarism must always ultimately triumph."

— Robert E. Howard, "Beyond the Black River", Chapter VIII: Conajohara No More (1935)

Direct experience of the oil booms in early twentieth century Texas tainted Howard's view of civilization. The benefits of progress came with lawlessness and corruption. One of the most common themes in Howard's writing is based on his view of history, a repeating pattern of civilizations reaching their peak, becoming decadent, decaying and then being conquered by another people. Many of his works are set in the period of decay or among the ruins the dead civilization leaves behind. Despite this, Howard was in favour of civilisation; he simply believed it was too fragile to survive for long.

=== Individualism ===
"Ever the man in men!" I said between my teeth. "Let a woman know her proper place: let her milk and spin and sew and bear children, nor look beyond her threshold or the command of her lord and master! Bah! I spit on you! There is no man alive who can face me with weapons and live, and before I die, I'll prove it to the world. Women! Cows! Slaves! Whimpering, cringing serfs, crouching to blows, revenging themselves by—taking their own lives, as my sister urged me to do. Ha! You deny me a place among men? By God, I'll live as I please and die as God wills, but if I'm not fit to be a man's comrade, at least I'll be no man's mistress. So go ye to hell, Guiscard de Clisson, and may the devil tear your heart!"

— Robert E. Howard, "Sword Woman"

The Kull stories in particular contain a constant theme of the confining nature of laws and customs. In "Sword Woman", the first of the Dark Agnes stories, Howard "was writing about rebellion and about throwing out the rules of society to make an ideal life for oneself." Agnes rebels against the social order of the day and refuses to be kept in her place. Biographer Mark Finn describes the protofeminist Dark Agnes stories as "practically autobiographical" and believes that the use of the first-person perspective was intentional.

Howard felt strongly about individual freedom. School had been frustrating for Howard, who was much more literate than his peers and not challenged by the schoolwork on offer. He felt trapped by the rules of the classroom.

In a 1932 letter to H. P. Lovecraft, Howard wrote:

I have but a single conviction or ideal, or whateverthehell it might be called: individual liberty. It's the only thing that matters a damn. I'd rather be a naked savage, shivering, starving, freezing, hunted by wild beasts and enemies, but free to go and come, with the range of the earth to roam, than the fattest, richest, most bedecked slave in a golden palace with the crustal fountains, silken divans, and ivory-bosomed dancing girls of Haroun al Raschid.

— Robert E. Howard, Letter to H. P. Lovecraft, circa December 1932

In his semi-autobiographical novel Post Oaks & Sand Roughs, Howard's proxy character, Steve Costigan displays a similar aversion to authority:

A low black fury was beginning to burn sluggishly in Steve's brain. Who was this swine to seek to govern his actions? The man with his watch and his sneer, his huge belly and his flabby flesh se[e]med to symbolize all that was hateful in civilization—commerce holding a watch on all dreamers. A cruel and dangerous contempt blazed through Steve's growing wrath.

— Robert E. Howard, Post Oaks & Sand Roughs

=== Existentialism ===
Though Howard died in 1936, before existentialism was defined, it was popularised in the United States by Jean-Paul Sartre's Being and Nothingness (1943), his philosophy, as shown through his works, is a close parallel.

Howard's most famous character, Conan, is an existentialist character who defines his own purpose and shapes his own destiny. Conan does not have a noble destiny; in contrast to much fantasy fiction, he is not of noble birth, he is not fulfilling any prophecy, he is not the "chosen one" of any gods or powers that be. When Conan ultimately becomes King of Aquilonia, he is not preordained to do so by fate nor is he the legitimate heir; he seizes an opportunity to make himself king. Conan is "the consummate self-determining man."

In The Shadow Kingdom, another character, Kull, gives thought to his essential nature:

And what, mused Kull, were the realities of life? Ambition, power, pride? The friendship of man, the love of women—which Kull had never known—battle, plunder, what? Was it the real Kull who sat upon the throne or was it the real Kull who had scaled the hills of Atlantis, harried the far isles of the sunset, and laughed upon the green roaring tides of the Atlantean sea? How could a man be so many different men in a lifetime? For Kull knew that there were many Kulls and he wondered which was the real Kull.

— Robert E. Howard, The Shadow Kingdom

=== Irrationalism and aestheticism ===
A hurried babel of grisly tongues rose and the shadows heaved in turmoil. One segment of the mass detached itself for an instant and Bran cried out in fierce revulsion, though he caught only a fleeting glimpse of the thing, had only a brief impression of a broad strangely flattened head, pendulous writhing lips that bared curved pointed fangs, and a hideously misshapen, dwarfish body that seemed—mottled—all set off by those unwinking reptilian eyes. Gods!—the myths had prepared him for horror in human aspect, horror induced by bestial visage and stunted deformity—but this was the horror of nightmare and the night.

— Robert E. Howard, "Worms of the Earth" (1932)

Irrationalism and aestheticism were themes in Howard's work. His philosophies were in line with the Romantic and Neo-Romantic eras. While he held many philosophical positions in his life, they all shared a rebellion against reason, against tradition, and against tyranny in any from.

Howard's poetry was traditional and Romantic in form; which was against the trend of poetic tastes during his lifetime. He was a "romantic isolate" sustaining the English romantic verse tradition in an "aesthetic 'Underground'" of poets such as Bliss Carman, George Sterling, Madison Cawein and other individuals scattered across North America.

The concept of beauty is expressed through Howard's fiction and verse in his love of colour and pageantry, from battlefields to decadent cities. Wanderlust is a minor theme in a lot of his works but, despite travelling widely around Texas and nearby states, he did not travel as much as he wished. Instead he romanticised these places he wanted to visit. This plays back into the Romantic concept of Beauty. The inspiration for this may have come from Howard's mother, Esther. In a 1944 letter to E. Hoffmann Price, Howard's father, Dr. Isaac M. Howard, recalled that "she was a lover of the beautiful. As Robert grew, he saw the beautiful around the old country of the post oaks. His agile imagination transformed that drab old country into beautiful landscapes."

Aestheticism is addressed in the story "Queen of the Black Coast" when Conan expresses his personal philosophy of life:

Let me live deep while I live; let me know the rich juices of red meat and stinging wine on my palate, the hot embrace of white arms, the mad exultation of battle when the blue blades flame and crimson, and I am content... I live, I burn with life, I love, I slay, and am content."

— Robert E. Howard, "Queen of the Black Coast" (1934)

This echoes the Rubaiyat of Omar Khayyam, which was one of Howard's favourite works of poetry (describing it as one of the most powerful pieces of literature), and one of its most famous quatrains:

A Book of Verses underneath the Bough,
A Jug of Wine, a Loaf of Bread—and Thou
Beside me singing in the Wilderness—
Oh, Wilderness were Paradise enow!

— Omar Khayyám, translated by Edward FitzGerald, Rubaiyat of Omar Khayyam, Quatrain XII

Howard's unique addition to Khayyám's vision of paradise is "the mad exultation of battle", or violent action as an ideal equal to food, drink and romantic company (see Hate and violence).

Scepticism regarding human rationality and achievement is clear in a letter Howard wrote to his friend Tevis Clyde Smith on August 28, 1925: "There is so much of the true and false in all things. Sometimes I believe that the whole is a monstrous joke and human accomplishment and human knowledge, gathered slowly and with incredible labor through the ages, are but shifting, drifting wraiths on the sands of Time, the sands that shall some day devour me."

Howard borrowed many feature of his fiction from the decadent movement, such as black magic, accursed jewels, snake figures and more.

=== The Irish ===
Some of Howard's heroes are usually Irish and Howard himself was proud of his Irish heritage.

=== Past lives ===
One of his favorite themes was that of past lives and reincarnation.

=== Sex appeal ===
Howard's later fiction often includes a damsel in distress (usually with minimal clothing) to add sex appeal to the story. This addition was likely an effort to earn the stories the honor of being illustrated on the publishing magazine's cover. A story with a cover illustration would normally earn an extra payment on top of the initial sale.

== Sources ==
- Burke, Rusty, "A Short Biography of Robert E. Howard", The Robert E. Howard United Press Association, archived from the original on 2011-09-29
- Coffman, Frank (2006), "Texas Talespinner: Robert E. Howard's Way with Words", in Szumskyj, Benjamin (ed.), Two-Gun Bob, New York, NY: Hippocampus Press, pp. 69–96, ISBN 0-9771734-5-3
- Eng, Steve (2000) [orig. 1984], "Barbarian Bard: The Poetry of Robert E. Howard", in Herron, Don (ed.), The Dark Barbarian, Berkeley Heights, NJ: Wildside Press, pp. 23–64, ISBN 1-58715-203-7
- Finn, Mark (2006), Blood & Thunder, Austin, TX: Monkeybrain, Inc., ISBN 1-932265-21-X
- Grin, Leo (2004), "The Reign of Blood", in Herron, Don (ed.), The Barbaric Triumph, Maryland: Wildside Press, pp. 141–160, ISBN 978-0-8095-1567-7
- Guillaud, Lauric (2004), "Barbarism and Decadence", in Herron, Don (ed.), The Barbaric Triumph, Maryland: Wildside Press, pp. 79–94, ISBN 978-0-8095-1567-7
- Hoffman, Charles (2004), "Conan the Existential", in Herron, Don (ed.), The Barbaric Triumph, Maryland: Wildside Press, pp. 5–10, ISBN 978-0-8095-1567-7
- Khayyám, Omar; FitzGerald, Edward (1889). The Rubaiyat of Omar Khayyam (5th ed.) – via Wikisource.
- Howard, Robert Ervin (July 1925). Spear and Fang – via Wikisource.
- —— (August 1929). "Chapter IV: Masks" . The Shadow Kingdom – via Wikisource.
- —— (August 1934a). The Devil in Iron – via Wikisource.
- —— (August 1934b). "Chapter II: The Black Lotus" . Queen of the Black Coast – via Wikisource.
- —— (2011), "Sword Woman", Sword Woman and Other Historical Adventures, New York, NY: Del Rey, ISBN 978-0-345-50546-0
- King, Stephen (1983), Danse Macabre, New York, NY: Berkley Books, ISBN 978-0-425-10433-0
- Knight, George (2000) [orig. 1984], "Robert E. Howard: Hard-Boiled Heroic Fantasist", in Herron, Don (ed.), The Dark Barbarian, Berkeley Heights, NJ: Wildside Press, pp. 117–134, ISBN 1-58715-203-7
- Leiber, Fritz (2000) [orig. 1984], "Howard's Fantasy", in Herron, Don (ed.), The Dark Barbarian, Berkeley Heights, NJ: Wildside Press, pp. 3–16, ISBN 1-58715-203-7
- Sidney-Fryer, Donald (2000) [orig. 1984], "Robert E. Howard: Frontiersman of Letters", in Herron, Don (ed.), The Dark Barbarian, Berkeley Heights, NJ: Wildside Press, pp. 17–22, ISBN 1-58715-203-7 Originally from Etchings in Ivory (1968).
- Trout, Steven R. (2004), "Heritage of Steel: Howard and the Frontier Myth", in Herron, Don (ed.), The Barbaric Triumph, Maryland: Wildside Press, pp. 141–160, ISBN 978-0-8095-1567-7
- Waterman, Edward A. (2004), "The Shadow of a Soul on Fire: Robert E. Howard and Irrationalism", in Herron, Don (ed.), The Barbaric Triumph, Maryland: Wildside Press, pp. 59–78, ISBN 978-0-8095-1567-7
