= Kull (short story collection) =

1967 collection of short stories by Robert E. Howard

- Cover of the first edition
- Author: Robert E. Howard
- Cover artist: Roy Krenkel
- Language: English
- Series: Kull of Atlantis
- Genre: Fantasy
- Publisher: Lancer Books
- Publication date: 1967
- Publication place: United States
- Media type: Print (hardback)
- Pages: 223 pp
- OCLC: 426080

Kull is a collection of Fantasy short stories by Robert E. Howard. It was first published in 1967 by Lancer Books under the title King Kull. This edition included three stories completed by Lin Carter from unfinished fragments and drafts by Howard. Later editions, retitled as Kull, replaced the stories with the uncompleted fragments. Two of the stories, and the poem, "The King and the Oak", originally appeared in the magazine Weird Tales.

== Contents (1967 edition) ==
- Prologue
- "Exile of Atlantis"
- "The Shadow Kingdom"
- "The Altar and the Scorpion"
- "Black Abyss" (completed by Lin Carter from an unfinished draft entitled "The Black City")
- "Delcardes’ Cat"
- "The Skull of Silence"
- "Riders Beyond the Sunrise" (completed by Lin Carter from an untitled fragment)
- "By This Axe I Rule!"
- "The Striking of the Gong" (edited for publication by Lin Carter from an unpublished manuscript)
- "Swords of the Purple Kingdom"
- "Wizard and Warrior" (completed by Lin Carter from an untitled fragment)
- "The Mirrors of Tuzun Thune"
- "The King and the Oak"

== Reception ==
Algis Budrys reviewed the collection favorably, describing Howard's writing as "combining a masochistic megalomania with a strong streak of horror writing." He noted that Carter's pastiche-completion of "Black Abyss" was surprisingly successful.

== Publication history ==
- 1967, US, Lancer Books 73-650 OCLC 426080, Pub date 1967, Paperback, as King Kull by Robert E. Howard and Lin Carter
- 1976, UK, Sphere Books ISBN 0-7221-4716-3, Pub date 1976, Paperback, as King Kull
- 1978, US, Bantam Books ISBN 0553120190, Pub date September 1978, as Kull, removes Carter edits
- 1985, US, Donald M. Grant, Publisher, Inc. ISBN 0-937986-75-5, Pub date November 1985, Hardcover, as Kull, removes Carter edits
- 1995, US, Baen Books ISBN 0-671-87673-2, Pub date July 1995, Paperback, as Kull, removes Carter edits, adds story "The Curse of Golden Skull"
- 2006, US. Del Rey ISBN 0-345-49017-7, Pub. date 2006, Trade paperback, as "Kull, Exile of Atlantis", includes early non-Kull work from 1924, as well as biographical essays detailing Kull's creation.

== Sources ==
- Brown, Charles N.; William G. Contento (November 20, 2007). "The Locus Index to Science Fiction (1984-1998)".
- Chalker, Jack L.; Mark Owings (1998). The Science-Fantasy Publishers: A Bibliographic History, 1923-1998. Westminster, MD and Baltimore: Mirage Press, Ltd. pp. 330–331.
- Contento, William G. (January 26, 2008). "Index to Science Fiction Anthologies and Collections". Archived from the original on January 23, 2009.
- Woods, Todd A. (2000). "King Kull". Howard Works.
