= Solomon Kane (comics) =

Fictional character in Marvel Comics

- Cover of The Saga of Solomon Kane (2009), trade paperback collected edition, art by Dorian Vallejo

Character information
- First appearance: Monsters Unleashed #1 (August 1973)
- Created by: Robert E. Howard

Publication information
- Publisher: Marvel Comics; Dark Horse Comics
- Formats: Original material for the series has been published as a strip in the comics anthology(s) Savage Sword of Conan and a set of limited series.
- Genre: Dark fantasy
- Publication date: The Sword of Solomon Kane; September 1985–July 1986; Solomon Kane; September 2008–February 2009
- Number of issues: The Sword of Solomon Kane; 6 Solomon Kane; 5
- Main character(s): Solomon Kane

Creative team
- Writer(s): Roy Thomas

Reprints
- Collected editions
- The Saga of Solomon Kane: ISBN 1-59582-317-4
- The Chronicles Of Solomon Kane: ISBN 1595824103
- The Castle Of The Devil: ISBN 1595822828

Solomon Kane is a fictional character featured in several comics published by Marvel Comics between 1973 and 1994. He was originally created by the pulp-era writer Robert E. Howard. Dark Horse Comics began publishing a new series of Kane stories in 2008, and also published collections of the 1970s Marvel stories in 2009.

== Marvel Comics ==
Marvel Comics published several comic books featuring Solomon Kane. He was the lead character in the six-issue limited series Sword of Solomon Kane, published 1985–6. He also appeared numerous times in the company's black and white, non-Code approved magazine format comics, most frequently in Savage Sword of Conan, starring Howard's most popular pulp character. The complete list of Marvel's Solomon Kane story appearances are:

- Monsters Unleashed #1 (August 1973), an adaptation of Howard's Skulls in the Stars by Roy Thomas, art by Ralph Reese.
- Dracula Lives #3 (October 1973), Kane meets Dracula by Thomas, art by Alan Weiss.
- The Conan Saga #50 (May 1991) by Alan Rowlands, art by Steve Carr and Al Williamson (although this magazine was a reprint title, the Kane story in this issue had not been previously published).
- Kull and the Barbarians #2–3 (July and September 1975), an adaptation of The Hills of the Dead by Thomas, art by Weiss, Neal Adams and Pablo Marcos.
- Marvel Premiere #33–34 (December 1976 and February 1977). Like the Kane mini-series, this was a Code-approved four-color comic, an adaptation of Red Shadows by Thomas, art by Howard Chaykin.
- Marvel Preview #19 (Summer 1979), an adaptation of "The Footfalls Within" by Don Glut, art by Will Meugniot and Steve Gan.
- Savage Sword of Conan #13–14, 18–20, 22, 25, 26, 33, 34, 37, 39, 41, 53, 54, 62, 83, 162, 171, 219 and 220 (July 1976–April 1994) by Thomas, Glut, Doug Moench, Jo Duffy and John Arcudi, art by Gan, Chaykin, Weiss, and many others, including a sequel to the Kane vs. Dracula story, two adaptations of the Howard poem Solomon Kane's Homecoming, and in the last two issues, a meeting of Kane and Conan for which Thomas, with artist Colin MacNeil, used Howard's brief Kane fragment "Death's Black Riders" as a springboard.
- The Sword of Solomon Kane #1–6 (September 1985–July 1986). Of the six issues, four adapted Howard stories (all previously adapted by Marvel), and two (#2 and #4) contained original stories by Ralph Macchio, with the art credits varying. The finale also contained yet another rendering of the poem "Solomon Kane's Homecoming", illustrated by Sandy Plunkett and Williamson.

In 2019, Solomon Kane returned to Marvel as part of the crossover limited series Conan: Serpent War; teaming up with Conan, Dark Agnes and Moon Knight.

== Dark Horse Comics ==
It was announced at the 2006 Comic Con that Paradox Entertainment has completed a publishing deal with Dark Horse Comics for a Solomon Kane comic series, to be written by Scott Allie. The first two arcs featured completed versions of two Howard fragments — "The Castle of the Devil" and "Death's Black Riders". The first issue picks Kane up traveling through the Black Forest after ending his military career. It was a five-issue mini-series, based on "Castle of the Devil", and featured art by Mario Guevara (pencils), Dave Stewart (colors) and John Cassaday (covers). An eight-page sample was posted on the Dark Horse Presents MySpace page in June 2008 and the first issue was published in September 2008.

The second arc, "Death's Black Riders", was a four-issue mini-series published from January 2010 to June 2010. The third arc, "Red Shadows", had its first issue published in April 2011. "Red Shadows", based on a Robert E. Howard story and previously interpreted by Marvel in Marvel Premiere #33–34 (1976), follows Solomon Kane as he tracks le Loup, an expert French swordsman and womanizer with a habit of killing his conquests, through Europe, across the Mediterranean, and down the West Coast of Africa.

== Titan Comics ==
After positive responses to a serialized Solomon Kane back-up story by Patrick Zircher in 2024 in the first three issues of The Savage Sword of Conan, Heroic Signatures greenlit a four-issue mini series titled Solomon Kane: The Serpent Ring, written and drawn by Zircher and published in 2025. The story takes place in the 16th century in southern Europe and Africa and features the ancient "Serpent Ring" from Thoth-Amon (which is also featured in the Robert E: Howard stories The Phoenix on the Sword and The Haunter of the Ring which take place during the Hyborian age and in the 1930s, respectively).

== Collected editions ==
Solomon Kane Volume 1: The Castle of the Devil, a trade paperback collection of the Dark Horse five-issue mini-series, was published in July 2009 (ISBN 1595822828).

In February 2009, Dark Horse announced a new collection entitled The Saga of Solomon Kane - Soft Cover (ISBN 1595823174) which collected the 1970s Marvel stories. This 400+ page collection includes various stories from Savage Sword of Conan, Conan Saga, Kull and the Barbarians, Marvel Preview, Monsters Unleashed and Dracula Lives.

In December 2009, Dark Horse announced a collection entitled Robert E. Howard Chronicles Slipcase - HC Box Set (ISBN 978-1-59582-407-3).

Solomon Kane Volume 2: Death's Black Riders, a trade paperback collection of the Dark Horse four-issue mini-series, was published in October July 2010 (ISBN 1-59582-590-8).

Solomon Kane Volume 3: Red Shadows, a trade paperback collection of the Dark Horse four-issue mini-series, was published in October December 2011 (ISBN 1-59582-878-8).

In August 2021, Marvel reprints the Dark Horse edition of The Saga of Solomon Kane - Soft Cover (ISBN 1595823174) named Solomon Kane Original Marvel Years Omnibus a HC edition (ISBN 9781302925611). This Marvel reprinted HC book comes in 2 different dust jacket cover, the Direct Market (DM) CV and the Standard (ST) CV.

Solomon Kane: The Serpent Ring, the trade paperback collection of the Titan Comics four-issue mini-series, was published in November 2025 (ISBN 978-1-78774-642-8).
