= Serpent Men =

Fictional comic book race of beings

In-universe information
- Home world: Earth
- Base of operations: Valusia (initially)

Serpent Men are a fictional race created by Robert E. Howard for his King Kull tales. They first appeared in "The Shadow Kingdom", published in Weird Tales in August 1929.

They were later adapted for the Marvel Comics Conan comics by Roy Thomas and Marie Severin. Their first Marvel Universe appearance was in Kull the Conqueror vol. 1 #2 (September, 1971).

== Origin and society ==
In Robert E. Howard's King Kull stories, the serpent people worship a god known as the Great Serpent. Later writers would identify the Great Serpent with the Great Old One Yig and with the Stygian serpent god Set from Howard's Conan stories.

The seat of the First Empire of the Serpent People, during the Paleozoic era, is Valusia. Valusia is a fictional country in the Kull stories of Robert E. Howard and his stories tell, among other things, of the Serpent Men trying to conquer the world once again, around 20,000 years ago, where Kull from Atlantis reigned over the Valusia Kingdom, located on the west coast of the main continent of Thuria. The ancient Serpent Empire was based on sorcery and alchemy, but collapsed with the rise of the dinosaurs about 225 million years ago during the Triassic era. The Serpent Men originally ruled over humans in Valusia, but were defeated and almost wiped out in humanity's battle for survival against the "elder things", which predated even them. Over time, humans dominated Valusia and the Serpent Men became a legend. The Serpent Men, one of the few surviving "elder things", infiltrated human society and ruled from behind the scenes for a time, but were again discovered, defeated, and cast out in a secret war. However, they later repeated this tactic. Soon, they added the front of a Snake Cult religion, which gained power and influence within Valusia while the Serpent Men used their abilities of disguise to murder or replace each reigning monarch. Their power is eventually broken by King Kull, formerly an Atlantean barbarian who had recently conquered Valusia, and the Pict Brule the Spear-Slayer, whose society was aware of the Serpent Men's infiltration.

After the destruction of Valusia, the Serpent Men escaped to Yoth, a cavern beneath K'n-yan in North America (ironically, the Pictish Isles of the Kull stories). They built subterranean cities, of which only ruins remain in the modern age. Explorers from K'n-yan visited Yoth frequently to learn more of the Serpent Men's scientific lore. Their next downfall came when they brought idols of Tsathoggua from N'kai and abandoned their patron deity Yig to worship their new god. As retribution, Yig placed his curse upon them and forced the few remaining worshipers to flee into a series of caverns beneath Mount Voormithadreth.

== Appearance and abilities ==
=== Serpent Men ===
Serpent Men are humanoids with scaled skin and snake-like heads. They possess magical abilities, the most common of which is the use of illusion to disguise themselves as a human. In some stories, the ghost of someone killed by a Serpent Man becomes the Serpent Man's slave. Due to the shape of their mouths, Serpent Men cannot utter the phrase "Ka nama kaa lajerama." Howard's character Kull uses the phrase as a shibboleth in the story The Shadow Kingdom.

== Cthulhu Mythos ==
Lin Carter and Clark Ashton Smith adapted the race for inclusion in the Cthulhu Mythos, inspired by H. P. Lovecraft's 1921 short story "The Nameless City", which refers to an Arabian city built by a pre-human reptilian race. Lovecraft's 1936 story "The Haunter of the Dark" explicitly mentions the "serpent men of Valusia" as being one-time possessors of the Shining Trapezohedron. However, the Cthulhu Mythos was already connected to the works of Robert E. Howard (a contemporary and correspondent of H. P. Lovecraft as well as a direct contributor to the Mythos itself). In this case, the Serpent Men were created for the first Kull story. The character of Kull later made an appearance in a Bran Mak Morn story, Kings of the Night, while in another such story, "Worms of the Earth", Bran Mak Morn explicitly refers to Cthulhu and R'lyeh. Many Conan stories written by Howard are also part of the Mythos.

== Conan ==
The fictional settings of King Kull and Robert E. Howard's other creation, Conan the Barbarian, are linked through Howard's essay The Hyborian Age. This states that Valusia, and its Thurian Age, existed in some time before Conan's Hyborian Age (the land was reshaped in between the story cycles by an undefined cataclysm). The Serpent Men do not, however, appear in any Conan story written by Robert E. Howard himself.

They made a reappearance in "Shadows in the Skull" by L. Sprague de Camp and Lin Carter, the last of the stories collected in Conan of Aquilonia. In that story, Conan encounters a colony of Serpent Men hiding out in what would correspond to South Africa, the remaining allies of his arch-enemy, the sorcerer Thoth-Amon, after Conan eliminated all of his human allies. These are in fact Serpent Women, who magically show an alluring female appearance to King Conan and plan on sacrificing him while Thoth-Amon watches from hiding. Their deception is discovered by Conan's teenage son, Conn, who sees at first what appears to be a beautiful girl; but her reflection in a burnished shield reveals the woman's true identity by showing him a serpent-like head. Conan and Conn eventually settle their conflict with Thoth-Amon, while the Aquailonian knights slay all of the Serpent Women.

In The Temple of Abomination, written by Howard and completed by Richard L. Tierney, the Irish pirate Cormac Mac Art encounters a single Serpent Man still dominating a sinister temple in a forsaken corner of King Arthur's Britain.

== Marvel Comics ==
Serpent-Men

Publication information
- Publisher: Marvel Comics
- First appearance: Kull the Conqueror #2 (September 1971)
- Created by: Roy Thomas; Marie Severin

Serpent-Men have also appeared in Marvel Comics. They first appeared in Kull the Conqueror #2 and were adapted by Roy Thomas and Marie Severin. Since then, they have been imported into the Conan comics, as well as other adaptations and Conan pastiches.

The original Serpent Men were a race of reptilian semi-humanoids, who were created by the demon Set and ruled areas of prehistoric Earth. Due to the efforts of Kull and Conan, the original Serpent-Men became extinct about 8,000 years ago. However, since then, numerous human worshipers of Set and his demonic progeny such as Sligguth have taken on reptilian characteristics to different extents. Some, like the people of Starkesboro, are only partially transformed. Others become hosts for the spirits of long-extinct original Serpent Men, who transform their bodies into duplicates of their own, complete with their power to take the form of any human.

Some modern Serpent Men encountered Spider-Man in the modern era. A Serpent Man passed himself off as the ghost of Uncle Ben to be part of an illusion that Spider-Man ascended into Heaven. To gain Spider-Man's trust, a Serpent Man posed as Devil-Slayer to attack the Serpent-Men. After Spider-Man experienced some memories about Kull, the Devil-Slayer imposter took Spider-Man to the cave where the Spider People resided and Spider-Man lifted the statue of the Spider God Omm (who was fooled into thinking that Spider-Man was one of his own due to his radioactive blood) after a fight with the Spider People. Once in the sewers, Spider-Man was duped by the Devil-Slayer imposter where they encountered the Defenders members Doctor Strange, Clea, Gargoyle, Hulk, Namor, and Valkyrie. When Spider-Man asks the Defenders to pronounce the words on the card, they could not and the Serpent Men shed their disguises. After destroying the statue, Spider-Man freed the Defenders (which had the true Devil-Slayer among them) as Doctor Strange banished the Serpent Men to Limbo. The human followers of the Serpent-Men were allowed to leave unmolested.

Russel Daboia is a Serpent Man/demon hybrid that fought the Avengers alongside Nicholas Scratch and the Salem's Seven.

== In other media ==
The Serpent Men were the main antagonists in the animated series Conan the Adventurer. The Serpent Men were personified by the wizard Wrath-Amon. The show retained the Serpent Men's ability to infiltrate human society in disguise, although this disguise failed in the presence of meteoric "star metal" in which contact with anything made of star metal sent a Serpent Man back to "the Abyss."

The Serpent Men appeared in the video game Marvel Heroes. This version of the Serpent Men have a snake tail instead of legs.

A Serpent Man appears in "The Deathless Snake", the last story in Edward M. Erdelac's Rainbringer: Zora Neale Hurston Against The Lovecraftian Mythos.

== See also ==
- Reptilian conspiracy theory— Robert E. Howard's short story "The Shadow Kingdom" from Weird Tales magazine is the origin of both the sword and sorcery subgenre of fantasy fiction and the conspiracy theory concerning a hidden species of advanced reptilian beings disguised among us while covertly controlling the levers of power, which has been a recurring theme in fiction and conspiracy theories since the publication of the story.
- Reptilian humanoids in fiction
- Serpent seed
- Snake Men from Masters of the Universe
- Snake People from the TV movie The Archer: Fugitive from the Empire
