= Conan (Titan Comics) =

American comic books

Comics featuring Conan the Barbarian and other characters by Robert E. Howard are currently published by Titan Comics, together with entertainment studio Heroic Signatures. Their collaboration to publish comics, graphic novels, and omnibus collections of older Conan comics started in 2023, after Marvel lost the license in 2022. The first ongoing series is Conan the Barbarian which started in August 2023. With crossover events and spin-off mini-series featuring other Robert E. Howard characters, such as Kull of Atlantis or Solomon Kane, they created a shared universe which is sometimes called the Howardverse.

== Publications ==
=== Conan the Barbarian ===
The first ongoing series Conan the Barbarian was introduced during Free Comic Book Day 2023 with an in issue that served as a prologue, followed by an ongoing series that started in August 2023. The series is written by Jim Zub, and started with Roberto De La Torre and Doug Braithwaite as artists alternating between story arcs. Danica Brine served as guest artist for two issues during the fifth story arc, and Fernando Dagnino joined the artist rotation for the sixth arc, starting with issue #21. For the milestone issue #25, Alex Horley painted an oversized King Conan story.

=== The Savage Sword of Conan ===
The Savage Sword of Conan was announced in July 2023 as a limited series, to be published in black-and-white and magazine-sized format. The first issue was released in February 2024 with issues published every two months. Each issue features comics, prose stories, poems, and art pages, starring Conan as well as other characters by Robert E. Howard. The magazine is edited by Chris Butera. Titan Comics initially committed to six issues, but announced at the 2024 San Diego Comic-Con that the series would be extended to a second year, and in 2025 it was further extended to a third year.

=== Howardverse crossovers ===
Conan: Battle of the Black Stone was a crossover event with Conan and other Robert E. Howard characters, namely Solomon Kane, Dark Agnes, James Allison, El Borak and Conrad and Kirowan. It started with a Free Comic Book Day issue in May 2024, written by Jim Zub and art by Jonas Scharf. This was followed by a collection of short stories in The Savage Sword of Conan #4 and a mini-series titled Conan: Battle of the Black Stone published from September to December 2024.

A second crossover event titled Conan: Scourge of the Serpent, written by Jim Zub with art by Ivan Gil, started publication 2025. The event kicked off with a Free Comic Book Day issue in May 2025 and was followed by a mini-series series starting in September 2025. The story features various Howardian characters and takes place in three different times that are "metaphysically linked": the Thurian age with Kull, the Hyborian age with Conan and the twentieth century with John Kirowan.

A third crossover event titled Conan: Tides of the Tyrant-King is being published in 2026. It features Thulsa Doom against Conan and his allies, and is again written by Jim Zub, with art by Spanish artist Jesús Merino. The event began in May with a Free Comic Book Day issue, followed by a mini-series in September 2026.

=== Solomon Kane ===
After positive responses to a serialized Solomon Kane back-up story by Patrick Zircher in the first three issues of The Savage Sword of Conan, Heroic Signatures greenlit a four-issue mini series titled Solomon Kane: The Serpent Ring, written and drawn by Zircher and published in 2025. The story takes place in the 16th century in southern Europe and Africa and features the ancient "Serpent Ring" from Thoth-Amon (also featured in the Robert E. Howard stories "The Phoenix on the Sword" and "The Haunter of the Ring", which take place during the Hyborian age and in the 1930s, respectively).

Due to the success of the first Solomon Kane comic series, a second series titled Solomon Kane: The Lion Errant and is being published during summer 2026. It takes place a few years after the first series and depicts Kane traveling to India where he has to face new evils.

=== Kull of Atlantis ===
A comic series centering on Kull of Atlantis was first announced at the 2025 San Diego Comic-Con. Further details were released at the SDCC the following year: it will be a four-issue mini series published in early 2026 and will be written by John Arcudi with art by Mark Buckingham.

=== Ongoing series ===
Title	Issues	Writer(s)	Artist(s)	Colourist(s)	Editor(s)	Debut date	Conclusion date
Conan the Barbarian	1–	Jim Zub	Roberto De La Torre; Doug Braithwaite; Fernando Dagnino; Danica Brine; Alex Horley	Dean White; Diego Rodriguez; José Villarrubia; Jão Canola	Matt Murray (1–6) Chris Butera (7–)	August 2, 2023	TBA

=== Limited series ===
Title	Issues	Writer(s)	Artist(s)	Colourist(s)	Editor(s)	Debut date	Conclusion date
The Savage Sword of Conan	1–18	various (anthology format)	various	n/a (black and white)	Matt Murray (1); Chris Butera (2–)	February 28, 2024	TBA
Conan: Battle of the Black Stone	1–4	Jim Zub	Jonas Scharf	Jão Canola	Chris Butera	September 4, 2024	December 4, 2024
Solomon Kane: The Serpent Ring	1–4	Patrick Zircher		Patrick Zircher; Pete Pantazis	Chris Butera	March 26, 2025	July 9, 2025
Conan: Scourge of the Serpent	1–4	Jim Zub	Ivan Gil	Jão Canola	Chris Butera	September 24, 2025	January 7, 2026
Solomon Kane: The Lion Errant	1–4	Patrick Zircher			Chris Butera	July 22, 2026	October 28, 2026
Conan: Tides of the Tyrant-King	1–4	Jim Zub	Jesús Merino	Jão Canola	Chris Butera	September 23, 2026	TBA
Untitled Kull series	1–4	John Arcudi	Mark Buckingham	TBA	TBA	2027	TBA

=== One-shots ===
Title	Writer	Artist	Colourist	Editor	Release date
Free Comic Book Day 2023: Conan the Barbarian	Jim Zub	Rob De La Torre	José Villarrubia	Matt Murray	May 6, 2023
Free Comic Book Day 2024: Conan: Battle of the Black Stone	Jim Zub	Jonas Scharf	Jão Canola	Chris Butera	May 4, 2024
Free Comic Book Day 2025: Conan: Scourge of the Serpent	Jim Zub	Ivan Gil	Jão Canola	Chris Butera	May 3, 2025
Conan the Barbarian: Eastern Horizons	Walt Simonson	Jerry Ma		Chris Butera	May 21, 2025 (digital only)
Free Comic Book Day 2026: Conan: Tides of the Tyrant-King	Jim Zub	Jesús Merino	Jão Canola	Chris Butera	May 2, 2026

== Collected editions ==
=== Trade paperbacks ===
Volume	Title	Collects	Pages	Release date	ISBN
Conan the Barbarian
1	Conan the Barbarian, Volume 1: Bound in Black Stone	Free Comic Book Day 2023: Conan the Barbarian; Conan the Barbarian #1–4	128	February 13, 2024	ISBN 978-1-78774-014-3
2	Conan the Barbarian, Volume 2: Thrice Marked for Death	Conan the Barbarian #5–8	112	July 16, 2024	ISBN 978-1-78774-015-0
3	Conan the Barbarian, Volume 3: The Age Unconquered	Conan the Barbarian #9–12	112	November 19, 2024	ISBN 978-1-78774-016-7
4	Conan the Barbarian, Volume 4: Frozen Faith	Conan the Barbarian #13–16	112	March 11, 2025	ISBN 978-1-78774-325-0
5	Conan the Barbarian, Volume 5: Twisting Loyalties	Conan the Barbarian #17–20	112	August 12, 2025	ISBN 978-1-78774-326-7
6	Conan the Barbarian, Volume 6: A Nest of Serpents	Conan the Barbarian #21–24	112	January 13, 2026	ISBN 978-1-78774-327-4
7	Conan the Barbarian, Volume 7: The Conquering Crown	Conan the Barbarian #25–28	128	May 19, 2026	ISBN 978-1-78774-608-4
8	Conan the Barbarian, Volume 8: Ghosts and Echoes	Conan the Barbarian #29–32	112	December 15, 2026	ISBN 978-1-78774-676-3
9	Conan the Barbarian, Volume 9: Cursed Shores Beyond	Conan the Barbarian #33–36	112	February 23, 2027	ISBN 978-1-78774-678-7
The Savage Sword of Conan
1	The Savage Sword of Conan, Volume 1	The Savage Sword of Conan #1–3	208	January 21, 2025	ISBN 978-1-78774-431-8
2	The Savage Sword of Conan, Volume 2	The Savage Sword of Conan #4–6	208	June 17, 2025	ISBN 978-1-78774-433-2
3	The Savage Sword of Conan, Volume 3	The Savage Sword of Conan #7–9	192	November 4, 2025	ISBN 978-1-78774-493-6
4	The Savage Sword of Conan, Volume 4	The Savage Sword of Conan #10–12	208	May 26, 2026	ISBN 978-1-78774-495-0
5	The Savage Sword of Conan, Volume 5	The Savage Sword of Conan #13–15	192	December 1, 2026	ISBN 978-1-78774-980-1
Howardverse crossovers
–	Conan: Battle of the Black Stone	Free Comic Book Day 2024: Conan: Battle of the Black Stone; Conan: Battle of the Black Stone #1–4	128	April 1, 2025	ISBN 978-1-78774-328-1
–	Conan: Scourge of the Serpent	Free Comic Book Day 2025: Conan: Scourge of the Serpent; Conan: Scourge of the Serpent #1–4	128	May 26, 2026	ISBN 978-1-78774-643-5
–	Conan: Tides of the Tyrant-King	Free Comic Book Day 2026: Conan: Tides of the Tyrant-King; Conan: Tides of the Tyrant-King #1–4	128	April 13, 2027	ISBN 978-1-80618-163-6
Solomon Kane
1	Solomon Kane: The Serpent Ring	Solomon Kane: The Serpent Ring #1–4	112	November 4, 2025	ISBN 978-1-78774-642-8
2	Solomon Kane: The Lion Errant	Solomon Kane: The Lion Errant #1–4	112	February 23, 2027	ISBN 978-1-80618-030-1

=== Hardcover ===
Volume	Title	Collects	Pages	Release date	ISBN
1	Conan the Barbarian, Volume 1: Bound in Black Stone Deluxe Edition	Free Comic Book Day 2023: Conan the Barbarian; Conan the Barbarian #1–4	144	October 21, 2025	ISBN 978-1-78774-837-8
–	Conan the Barbarian: The Nomad Deluxe Edition	Conan the Barbarian #25	64	October 6, 2026	ISBN 978-1-80618-268-8

== Reception ==
=== Accolades ===
Year	Award	Category	Nominee	Comic(s)	Result	Ref.
2024	Eisner Awards	Best Coloring	Dean White	Conan the Barbarian	Nominated	
2024	Eisner Awards	Best Lettering	Richard Starkings	Conan the Barbarian	Nominated	
2024	Tripwire Awards	Best New Series	—	Conan the Barbarian	Won	
2024	Tripwire Awards	Best Writer	Jim Zub	Conan the Barbarian	Won	
2024	Tripwire Awards	Best Cover Artist	Dan Panosian	Conan the Barbarian	Won	
2025	Ringo Awards	Best Anthology	—	The Savage Sword of Conan	Nominated	

== See also ==
- Conan (comics)
- Conan (Marvel Comics)
- Conan (Dark Horse Comics)
