= List of reptilian humanoids =

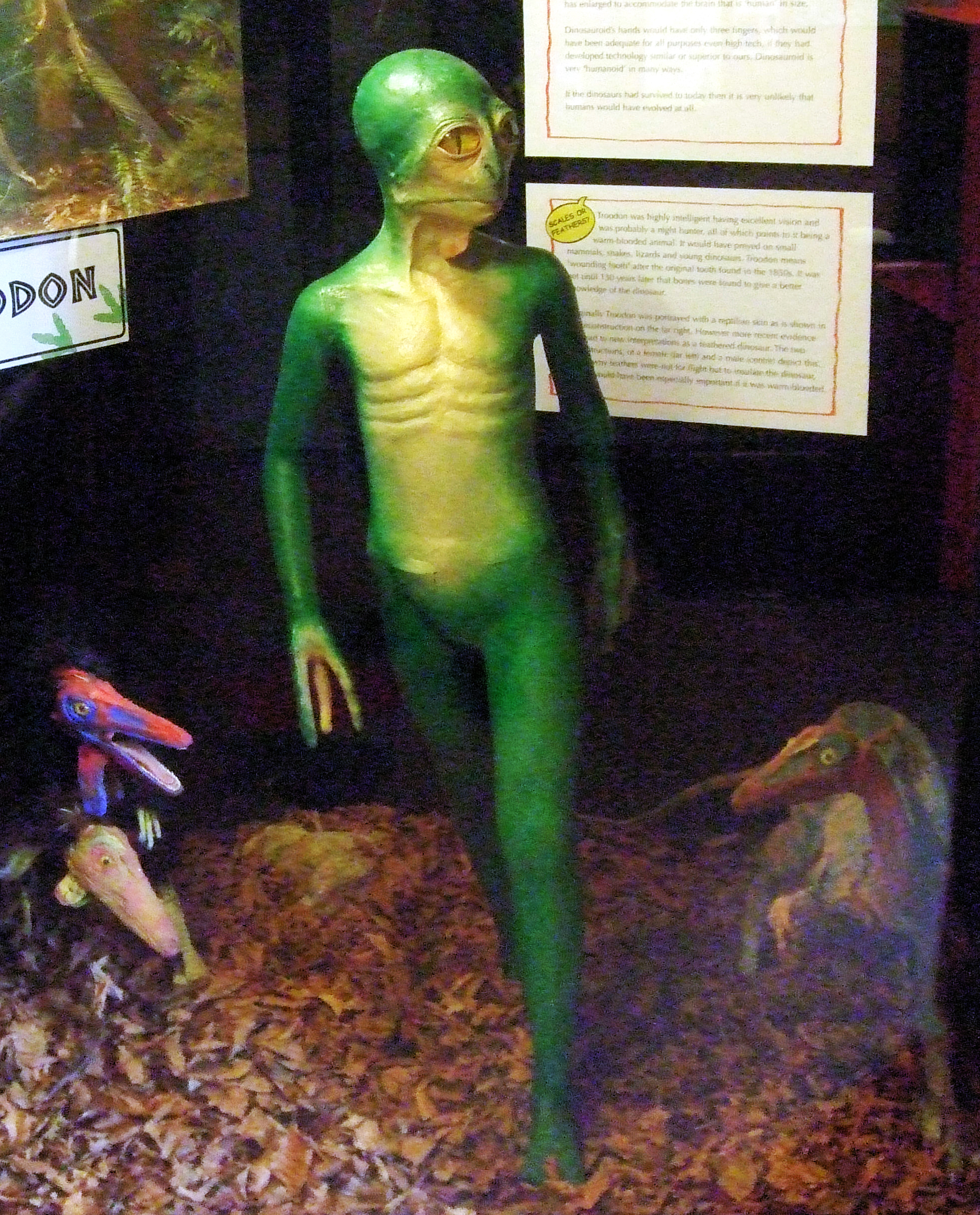
The Dinosauroid, a hypothetical anthropomorphic sapient dinosaur.

Reptilian humanoids appear in folklore, science fiction, fantasy, and conspiracy theories.

== Mythology ==
- Adi Shesha : lit, The first of all the snakes, mount of Hindu God Vishnu; descended to Earth in human form as Lakshmana and Balarama.
- Boreas (Aquilon to the Romans): The Greek god of the cold north wind, described by Pausanias as a winged man, sometimes with serpents instead of feet.
- Cecrops I: The mythical first King of Athens was half man, half snake.
- Chaac: The Maya civilization rain god, depicted in iconography with a human body showing reptilian or amphibian scales, and with a non-human head evincing fangs and a long, pendulous nose.
- Dragon Kings: Creatures from Chinese mythology sometimes depicted as reptilian humanoids.
- Some djinn in Islamic mythology are described as alternating between human and serpentine forms.
- Echidna, the wife of Typhon in Greek mythology, was half woman, half snake.
- Fu Xi: The serpentine founding figure from Chinese mythology.
- Glycon: A Roman snake god who had the head of a man.
- The Gorgons: Sisters in Greek mythology who had serpents for hair.
- The Lamiai: Female phantoms from Greek mythology depicted as half woman, half-serpent.
- Nāga (Devanagari: नाग): Half-human half-snake beings from Hindu mythology said to live underground and interact with human beings on the surface.
- Nüwa: Serpentine founding figure from Chinese mythology.
- Shenlong: A Chinese dragon thunder god, depicted with a human head and a dragon's body.
- Serpent: An entity from the Genesis creation narrative occasionally depicted with legs, and sometimes identified with Satan, though its representations have been both male and female.
- Sobek: Ancient Egyptian crocodile-headed god.
- Suppon No Yurei: A turtle-headed human ghost from Japanese mythology and folklore.
- Tlaloc: Aztec god depicted as a man with snake fangs.
- Typhon: The "father of all monsters" in Greek mythology, had a hundred snake-heads in Hesiod, or else was a man from the waist up, and a mass of vipers from the waist down.
- Xian: Immortal beings in Taoism who were sometimes depicted as humanoids with reptile and human features in the Han Dynasty
- Wadjet: Pre-dynastic snake goddess of Lower Egypt - sometimes depicted as half snake, half woman.
- Zahhak: A figure from Zoroastrian mythology who, in Ferdowsi's epic Shahnameh, grows a serpent on either shoulder.

== Folklore ==
- Cuca, an humanoid alligator witch from Brazilian folklore.
- Enchanted Moura, from Portuguese and Galician folklore appears as a snake with long blonde hair.
- El Hombre Caimán, a peeping-tom of Colombia using a potion turned caiman-man due to bungle.
- Kappa, sometimes turtle-shelled humanoid from Japanese mythology and folklore.
- The Lizard Man of Scape Ore Swamp in South Carolina, United States
- The Loveland Frog (or Loveland Lizard), in Loveland, Ohio, United States
- The Thetis Lake monster in Canada
- The White Snake, a figure from Chinese folklore

== Fringe theories ==
- Reptilians appear in some claims of alien encounters and in the conspiracy theories of David Icke

== Scientific speculation ==
- The dinosauroid, a hypothetical reptilian humanoid conjectured by palaeontologist Dale Russell.

== Fiction ==
A wide range of fictional works depict reptilian humanoids.

=== Literature ===
- Dracs from the Enemy Mine series by Barry B. Longyear.
- Evra Von from Darren Shan's "Saga of Darren Shan"
- The Horibs from the Pellucidar books
- The Barabels from Star Wars
- Hork-Bajir from K. A. Applegate's Animorphs
- The Lady of the Green Kirtle from CS Lewis's The Silver Chair who can turn into a giant snake
- An unnamed race from H.P. Lovecraft's The Nameless City - later Cthulhu Mythos tales have named these the Valusians or simply "serpent people".
- The Race from Harry Turtledove's Worldwar series
- The Serpent Men from Robert E. Howard's "The Shadow Kingdom" (also in the Marvel universe)
- Yig, the serpent god from H.P. Lovecraft's Cthulhu Mythos.
- Yilané from the Harry Harrison's novel West of Eden
- The Creeps and the Snake Lady from the Goosebumps franchise.
- The Troglodytes from The Trials of Apollo
- The Green Fangs from The Wingfeather Saga

=== Television ===
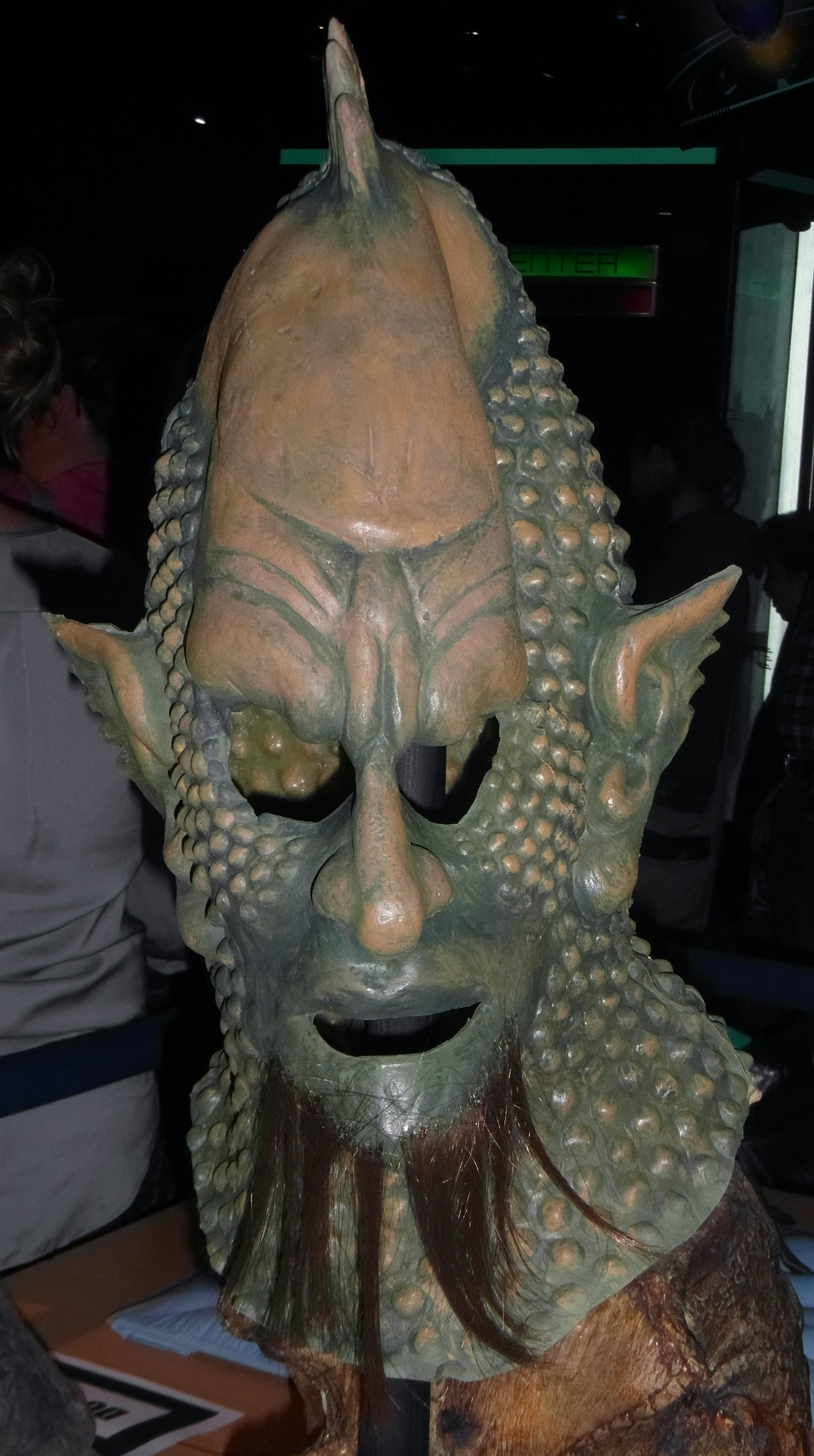
A Draconian mask, on display at the National Space Centre

==== Doctor Who ====
- Draconians
- Foamasi
- Homo reptilia
  - Silurians
  - Sea Devils
- Ice Warriors

==== Star Trek ====
- Cardassians
- Gorn
- Jem'Hadar
- Voth
- Tosk
- Xindi-Reptilians

==== Ninjago ====
- Serpentine
- Vermillion

==== Other ====
- Bunbo and Iguara from Sailor Moon
- Cobra-La and Cobra Commander from the G.I. Joe series
- Chase Young from Xiaolin Showdown
- The Culebra from From Dusk till Dawn: The Series
- Drakh and Narn from Babylon 5
- Lizard Man, Saurod, the Snake Men, and Whiplash from the Masters of the Universe franchise
- Lizardman Phantom from Kamen Rider Wizard
- The Lizardmen from Sir Arthur Conan Doyle's The Lost World
- Lizardo from The Ambiguously Gay Duo segment of TV Funhouse
- Scarrans from Farscape
- The Sleestaks from Land of the Lost
- Slithe and his fellow Lizards from ThunderCats
- The Snake People from the TV-movie The Archer: Fugitive from the Empire
- Spinner from My Hero Academia
- Tilian from A.T.O.M.
- Unas from Stargate
- Visitors from V
- Zafiro from Disney's Gargoyles is a Gargoyle who has a red-skinned snake-bodied gargate, with two humanoid arms and feathered wings, reminiscent of Kukulcan in Mayan myth and leader of his gargoyle clan
- The Zilards from Mighty Max

=== Comics ===
==== Marvel ====
- Anole, a reptilian mutant
- Badoon, a hostile alien race
- Chitauri, alien shapeshifters from the Ultimate Marvel universe.
- Iguana, an enemy of Spider-Man
- Lizard, an enemy of Spider-Man
- The Lizard Men of Subterranea
- The Lizard Men of the Savage Land
- The Lizard Men of Tok from the Microverse
- Sauron, a Pteranodon-like enemy of the X-Men
- Skrulls, an alien race of reptilian shapeshifters
- Slither, a snake-like mutant
- Stegron, a Stegosaurus-like enemy of Spider-Man
- Zn'rx (Snarks), a reptilian alien species encountered by the Power Pack

==== DC ====
- The Gordanians, a reptilian alien species
- Killer Croc, an enemy of Batman
- The Lizardmen from the Warlord series.
- The Llarans
- The Psions

==== Other ====
- Dinosaurs for Hire, dinosaur-like alien mercenaries
- Henry Phage from the Mr. Hero comics from Tekno Comix
- Kleggs, alien mercenaries in the Judge Dredd universe.
- The Teenage Mutant Ninja Turtles, Slash, Leatherhead, and even the Triceratons (Teenage Mutant Ninja Turtles)
- Treens from Dan Dare
- Tyranny Rex, a reptilian artist in stories published in 2000AD.
- Zarbon from anime and manga Dragon Ball Z.
- Calliope and Caliborn, reptilian aliens from the webcomic Homestuck.

=== Film ===
- Draco from Above Majestic
- Dracs from Enemy Mine
- Lectroids from Buckaroo Banzai
- Snake Men from Masters of the Universe
- Snake People from the TV movie The Archer: Fugitive from the Empire
- Thulsa Doom from Conan the Barbarian
- Trandoshans from Star Wars

=== Games ===
==== Roleplaying and strategy games ====
- Argonians, a race in The Elder Scrolls series
- Bangaa, a race in the game series of Final Fantasy
- Deathclaws, a species in the Fallout franchise
- Drell, a race in the Mass Effect series
- Dinaurians from Fossil Fighters and Fossil Fighters: Champions
- Iksar, a race from the EverQuest franchise.
- Lizalfos from the Legend of Zelda series.
- Lizardmen from the Warhammer fantasy tabletop games.
- Naga from the Warcraft series.
- Reptites from Chrono Trigger
- Saurians from Risen
- Susie from Deltarune

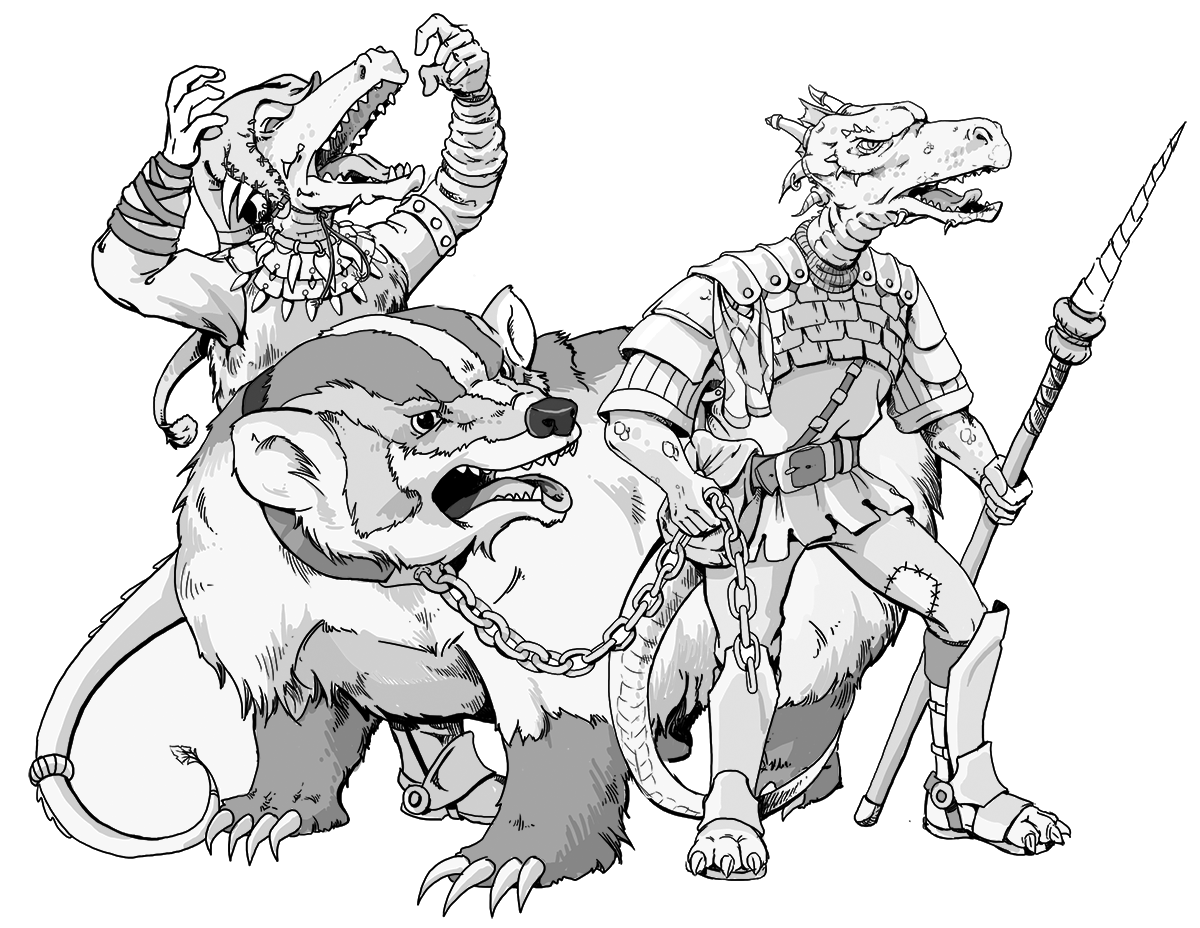
An illustration of kobolds

===== Dungeons & Dragons =====
- Kobolds
- Lizardfolk
- Saurials
- Troglodytes
- Yuan-ti

==== Platform, shooter and fighting games ====
- Bowser and the Koopas from Mario
- Espio the Chameleon and Vector the Crocodile from Sonic the Hedgehog
- Lizardman, a character from the Soul series of fighting games
- Locust Horde, the primary antagonists in the game franchise Gears of War
- King K. Rool and most Kremlings from Donkey Kong
- The Skaarj, a recurring reptilian humanoid race from Unreal franchise
- Reptile, Chameleon, and Khameleon from the video game series Mortal Kombat
- Riptor, a character from the fighting game Killer Instinct

== See also ==
- List of avian humanoids
- List of piscine and amphibian humanoids
- List of dragons in literature
- Insectoids in science fiction and fantasy
