= Steven Caldwell (disambiguation) =

Steven Caldwell (born 1980) is a Scottish football defender.

Steven or Stephen Caldwell may also refer to:

- Stephen A. Caldwell (1889–1956), American educator
- Steven Caldwell (Stargate), a fictional character from the American television show Stargate
- Stewart Cowley, a British science fiction writer who also wrote under the pseudonym "Steven Caldwell"

== See also ==
- Steve Cardwell (born 1950), Canadian ice hockey player
