= Exile of Atlantis =

- Short story by Robert E. Howard
- Original title: Untitled
- Country: United States
- Language: English
- Genre: Sword and sorcery

Publication
- Published in: King Kull
- Publisher: Lancer Books
- Publication date: 1967
- Series: Kull

"Exile of Atlantis" is a short story by Robert E. Howard and is the first story written by Howard to feature his creation Kull, set in his fictional Thurian Age.

It is effectively a prequel to the other Kull stories, detailing the events that led Kull to be exiled by his tribe, as well as foreshadowing Kull's future as a great king through the use of a prophetic dream. It also shows that Kull's rebelliousness against stifling old laws and traditions long antedated his becoming King of Valusia, and that he was very much an outsider even in his earlier life in Atlantis.

This story would not be published until 1967, in the Lancer book, King Kull.

== Plot ==
Long before it became a great empire, the continent of Atlantis was populated by various tribes of barbarians. Three barbarians from the sea-mountain tribe — Kull, Am-ra, and Gor-na — camp for the night. Gor-na, the oldest, tells an ancient legend of a tiger who prayed to the moon for deliverance from pursuing hunters and was granted sanctuary, causing all tigers to worship the moon. Kull finds fault with Gor-na's story, pointing out that tigers wouldn't worship the moon for aiding a tiger who lived centuries ago. Gor-na rebukes Kull for his ridicule of old myths and traditions, insisting that what has always been will always be. Kull believes his statement to be false, stating how not even mountains last forever. Gor-na reminds Kull that he was rescued by the sea-mountain tribe from a feral existence after his family perished in a great flood, and that Kull must learn to accept the ways of his adopted people. Am-ra, the youngest of the group, comes to Kull's defense, saying that while Kull may be an outsider, he is clearly the strongest member of their tribe. Gor-na has to agree.

Their conversation turns to the outside world. The neighboring islands of Lemuria are currently at war against the great kingdom of Valusia on the mainland. Kull gets excited, and says that he wishes to someday see Valusia, the City of Wonder. Gor-na says that if he ever does, it will be in chains.

As the men lay down to sleep, Kull has an amazing dream. In it, he hears the sound of war and trumpets. He sees glorious vistas opening up before him. Kull finds himself wearing a golden crown, and hears voices shouting "King Kull! King Kull!" Kull awakens to find himself haunted and enthralled by the vision.

The next morning, the men return to their village. They learn that a young girl named Ala is about to be burned at the stake. Ala dared to marry a Lemurian pirate, and was exiled for breaking the age-old feud. When the lovers' ship crashed and she washed ashore, Ala's people found her, and now intend to execute her - with her own mother disowning her while leading the vengeful mob. Kull finds himself bewildered and disgusted by the laws which insist an Atlantian must be put to death for marrying an enemy of their race. His eyes meet Ala's and they reach a silent understanding. Kull takes out his hunting knife and throws it at the girl's chest, killing her in an instant and sparing her from her fate of being burned alive.

While the villagers are still too shocked to act, Kull turns away and flees. Am-ra saves Kull's life by causing an archer to miss his shot. Kull climbs up the side of a cliff and escapes.
