= The Archer: Fugitive from the Empire =

1981 television film by Nicholas J. Corea

- Film poster
- Written by: Nicholas J. Corea
- Directed by: Nicholas J. Corea
- Starring: Lane Caudell; Belinda Bauer; George Kennedy; Kabir Bedi; Marc Alaimo; Priscilla Pointer
- Music by: Ian Underwood
- Country of origin: United States
- Original language: English

Production
- Producers: Stephen Caldwell; Nicholas J.Corea
- Cinematography: John McPherson
- Editor: Alan L. Shefland
- Running time: 95 minutes
- Production companies: Mad Dog Productions; Universal Television

Original release
- Network: NBC
- Release: April 12, 1981

The Archer: Fugitive from the Empire, also known as Fugitive from the Empire and The Archer and the Sorceress, is a 1981 American made for television sword and sorcery adventure film written, directed and produced by Nicholas J. Corea.

== Plot ==
Malveel, an area inhabited by clans of nomadic people who battle against each other, is in danger of being conquered by the rising Bar-Draikian empire, mainly called The Dynasty. After a long time, King Brakus, ruler of the Hawk Clan, is able to gather and finally peacefully unite several antagonistic clans, and thereafter tries to organize a war against their shared foe. However, there is treachery in his own ranks; his power-hungry nephews Sandros and Riis have contacted the Dynasty, and so the Dynasty's supreme warlord Gar and his snake people command the two to get rid of Brakus. Meanwhile, Brakus' son Toran has a clash with the beautiful sorceress Estra, whose mother was murdered by Brakus under the order of his mentor Lazar-Sa. At the end, Estra gives Toran a cryptic prophecy where she promises him a hopeless search.

The story goes on with Brakus getting killed on that same night by Gar using Toran's dagger, which had been secretly stolen by Sandros. While breathing his last, Brakus wrests a last promise from his son Toran to search for Lazar-Sa so the king's efforts weren't in vain. Toran is found with the corpse of his father, and is kept captive as his murderer. Toran's old mentor Mak, who is the bearer of a magic bow, frees Toran, and together they both start the search for Lazar-Sa while being chased by Gar and his snake people, who are determined to prevent a new alliance of the clans of Malveel under the leadership of the Hawk Clan. To ensure that, Gar kills Sandros and Riis. Drained by their escape and his age, Mak turns over the magic bow to his apprentice, dying when the bow severs his old bond to unite with Toran.

Toran is able to wound Gar at their next confrontation, which gets the attention of the rogue Slant, who henceforth joins Toran. Although Slant initially tries to steal the bow, he starts taking a genuine liking to Toran and aids him with his worldly wisdom. At the same time, Estra starts her own search for Lazar-Sa to kill him and avenge her mother. In the city of Kamal, Toran, Estra and Slant clash with a person claiming to be Lazar-Sa who is trying to chase the people out of the area. Toran, Estra and Slant are asked by the city council to end the menace. Because Lazar-Sa is their common target, the three agree and travel to a canyon where the sorcerer is hiding. After their departure, Gar also finds his way to Kamal, where he picks up Toran's trail again.

In the canyon, the three meet Lazar-Sa. They realize very quickly that he is just a magical simulacrum controlled by an ex-slave from Kamal named Rega. He once met Lazar-Sa and received a magical stone and a gauntlet from him to take revenge for the humiliations he has suffered. Rega tells the three where Lazar-Sa was seen last, but then kills himself because his scheme is revealed. Gar, who followed Toran, seizes the gauntlet and challenges Toran. During the battle, Toran strikes Lazar-Sa's stone with an arrow, rendering it unstable. The stone's power destroys the canyon, but Toran, Estra and Slant escape.

Following that, Estra parts from her former companions to follow her own path of finding Lazar-Sa. Toran and Slant are on their way back to Kamal when a message from Lazar-Sa reaches them. Lazar-Sa promises to lead Toran to his higher purpose if he frees the sorcerer from his current prison: The Endworld. What Toran and Slant don't know is that Gar also survived the catastrophe in the canyon and still hungers for Toran's death.

== Cast ==
- Lane Caudell as Toran
- Belinda Bauer as Estra
- George Kennedy as Brakus
- Kabir Bedi as Gar
- Marc Alaimo as Sandros
- Priscilla Pointer as Naestra
- Richard Moll The Bovum Ferryman
- Chao-Li Chi as Astrologer

== Production ==
Originally the television film was produced as a pilot for a planned television series by NBC, but the series never saw the light of day. This explains the open ending of the film (mainly that Lazar-Sa was not found and the group declares the search for him as a target). In comparison to films like Dragonslayer (1981) the technical possibilities of the early 1980s were not utilized to the fullest, aside from the look of the masks and the makeup effects used to portray the Snake People, designed by John Goodwin (The Thing, Men in Black). The film-score that was composed by the synthesizer-specialist Ian Underwood was one of the first soundtracks ever completely produced electronically.

== Reception ==
The film had more success abroad as it "received some theatrical exposure" across Europe and publications on media like VHS and DVD (29. April 2011, Koch Media) in Germany.

=== Critical response ===
Adventurous fantasy examination in comic style between good and evil, questionable when it comes to its glorification of violence.

— Lexikon of international film, Germany

Larry DiTillio reviewed The Archer: Fugitive from the Empire for Different Worlds magazine and stated that "The worst thing about the demise of The Archer as a series is that with the success of Excalibur and all the upcoming sword & sorcery in film, some kind of fantasy series will appear sooner or later. In the case of The Archer we would have had a series helmed by a fantasy buff, and written by writers familiar with the area (Nick was adamant on seeking out such scribblers to insure that the show would please fantasy fans)."

== See also ==
- Reptilian conspiracy theory— Robert E. Howard's short story "The Shadow Kingdom" from Weird Tales magazine is the origin of both the sword and sorcery subgenre of fantasy fiction and the conspiracy theory concerning a hidden species of advanced reptilian beings disguised among us while covertly controlling the levers of power, which has been a recurring theme in fiction and conspiracy since the story's publication.
