= Sandy Plunkett =

American artist and comics writer (born 1955)

- Born: Sandy Plunkett; October 18, 1955 (age 71)
- Areas: Writer, Penciller, Inker, Colourist

Charles "Sandy" Plunkett (born October 18, 1955) is an American artist and comics writer. He worked on several different series for Marvel Comics and DC Comics in the 1970s and 1980s.

== Early life ==
Plunkett grew up in New York City and began to draw comics at the end of high school.

== Career ==
He assisted the Crusty Bunkers at Neal Adams' Continuity Studios in the 1970s. Plunkett's first credited work was a one-page illustration in Savage Tales #11 (July 1975) published by Marvel Comics. He drew various short stories for Marvel, DC Comics, and Gold Key Comics over the next several years. Plunkett collaborated with writer Mike W. Barr and inker P. Craig Russell on a Spider-Man/Scarlet Witch team-up story for Marvel Fanfare #6 (Jan. 1983). He worked on the New Universe titles as well as a Daredevil serial in Marvel Comics Presents. Plunkett has made his home in Athens, Ohio since 1990.

== Bibliography ==
=== Dark Horse Comics ===
- Rocketeer Adventure Magazine #3 (1995)

=== DC Comics ===
- Batman: Legends of the Dark Knight #50 (one page) (1993)
- House of Mystery #253 (1977)
- Tom Strong's Terrific Tales #7 (2003)
- Unknown Soldier #210, 215 (1977–1978)
- Who's Who: The Definitive Directory of the DC Universe #8, 24 (1985–1987)

=== Gold Key Comics ===
- Boris Karloff Tales of Mystery #87, 91 (1978–1979)
- The Twilight Zone #67 (1975)

=== Heavy Metal ===
- Heavy Metal Special Editions #v13#1 (1999)

=== IDW Publishing ===
- Rocketeer Adventures #1 (2012)

=== Marvel Comics ===
- Codename: Spitfire #13 (1987)
- Conan the Barbarian #251 (1991)
- Defenders #53 (Clea backup story) (1977)
- Epic Illustrated #34 (1986)
- Justice #14 (1987)
- Marvel Comics Presents #69–72 (Daredevil); #131 (Ant-Man) (1991–1993)
- Marvel Fanfare #6 (Spider-Man and the Scarlet Witch); #42 (Captain Marvel); #45 (one page); #58 (Vision and the Scarlet Witch) (1983–1991)
- Nightmask #9 (1987)
- Official Handbook of the Marvel Universe #2, 4, 6, 9, 11 (1983)
- Official Handbook of the Marvel Universe Deluxe Edition #6–7, 9, 12, 14, 16, 18 (1986–1987)
- Savage Sword of Conan #188 (1991)
- Savage Tales #11 (one page) (1975)
- Solo Avengers #19 (Black Panther) (1989)
- Solomon Kane #6 (1986)

=== NBM Publishing ===
- Confessions of a Cereal Eater #1 (1995)

=== Swallow Press / Ohio University Press ===
- The World of a Wayward Comic Book Artist: The Private Sketchbooks of S. Plunkett (2010)
