= By This Axe I Rule! =

- Short story by Robert E. Howard
- Country: United States
- Language: English
- Genre: Sword & Sorcery

Publication
- Published in: King Kull
- Publication type: Paperback
- Publication date: 1967
- Series: Kull

"By This Axe I Rule!" is a fantasy short story by American writer Robert E. Howard, the last of his Kull stories, set in his fictional Thurian Age. It was first published in the Lancer Books paperback King Kull in 1967.

This story was rejected by the pulp magazines Argosy and Adventure in 1929, after which Howard rewrote it as the Conan story "The Phoenix on the Sword", substituting a new secondary plot and adding elements of supernatural horror. The main shared elements of the two stories are the conspiracy and the king's defeat of it. The Conan story was published in December 1932.

== Plot summary ==
An alliance of jealous nobles and outlaws plan on assassinating King Kull, having sown dissent among the citizens before subverting an officer of the royal guard into removing his men so their assassins have access to the King's chamber. The king is aware of the discontent, though not of their specific conspiracy. Meanwhile, Kull laments on how the laws of Valusia hamper his rule, and never allow him to govern as he wants. A young nobleman visits him and ask to marry a slave girl, but Kull is advised that this is impossible under an ancient law, engraved on a tablet crafted by hallowed lawmakers many centuries ago. Saddened, the nobleman is sent away with regrets.

Later, Kull has an encounter with the man's love interest, crying in the woods, and tries in vain to console her. The girl is a slave owned by one of the conspirators seeking to murder Kull, and overheard her master mention his plan with one of the fellow conspirators - whereupon she hastens to tell her lover.

That night, the conspirators - four leaders and sixteen robbers - sneak into the palace and enter Kull's private chambers. However, Kull awakens, realizes something is wrong, and manages to arm himself. Seizing an antique battle axe, which had hung on the wall for decades, he fights furiously, one against many, killing a large portion of the attackers. Still, he is nearly killed by the conspirators' leader when needing to wipe blood from his eyes. In the nick of time, the young noble arrives with his retainers, killing the assassin and saving Kull's life.

Though severely wounded, Kull is determined to reward fittingly the young lovers who saved his life. There and then he smashes with his axe the Tablets of the Law, proclaiming "I am the law!", "I am king, state, and law!" and "By this ax I rule!", before allowing the couple to happily marry.

== Adaptations ==
The first comic book appearance of King Kull was in "Kull the Conqueror" (1971) published by Marvel Comics. The first issue was in part an adaptation of "By This Axe I Rule!", and issue #11 (1973) was more specifically based on that story and had the same title. The 1997 movie Kull the Conqueror starring Kevin Sorbo was partly based on "By This Axe I Rule!".

== See also ==
- Robert E. Howard bibliography
