= The Shadow Kingdom =

- Short story by Robert E. Howard
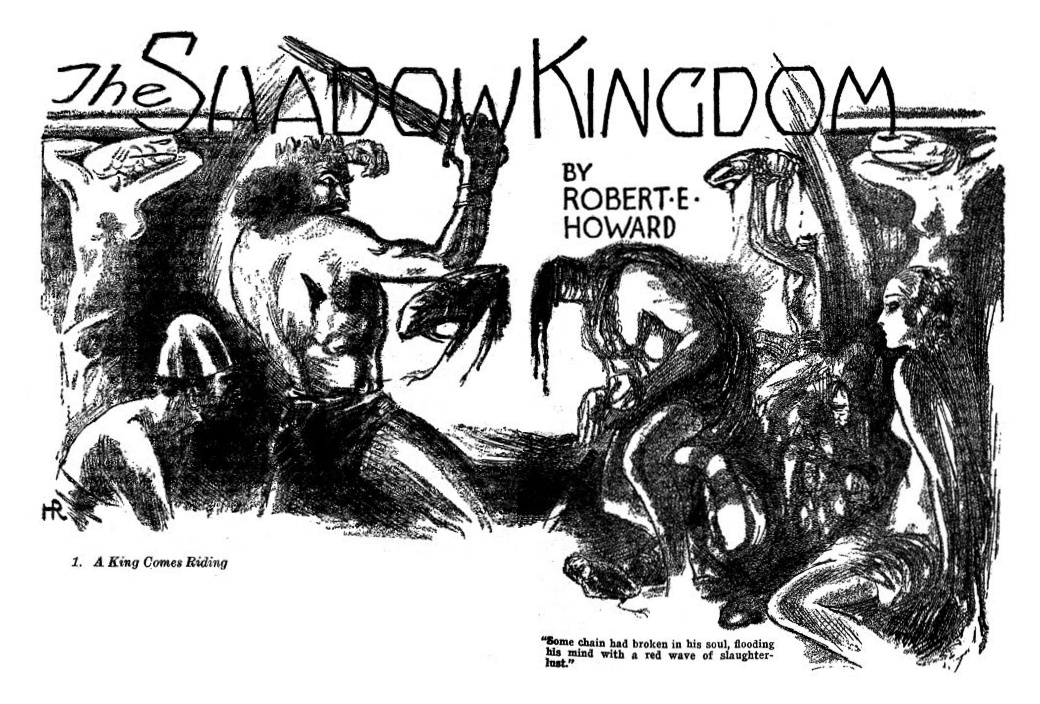
- Country: United States
- Language: English
- Genre: Sword and sorcery

Publication
- Published in: Weird Tales
- Publication date: August 1929

Chronology
- Series: Kull
—	The Mirrors of Tuzun Thune

"The Shadow Kingdom" is a fantasy novelette by American writer Robert E. Howard, the first of his Kull stories, set in his fictional Thurian Age. It was first published in the pulp magazine Weird Tales in August 1929.

The story introduces Kull himself, the setting of Valusia, Brule the Spear-Slayer (a supporting character), and the Serpent Men (who don't appear in any other work by Howard, but were adopted by later authors for derivative works and inclusion in the Cthulhu Mythos).

"The Shadow Kingdom" has been described as the first true "sword and sorcery" story, because of its barbarian hero, its mix of horror and adventure, and because the story is set in an imaginary world.

== Plot ==
The story starts shortly after Kull, a barbarian from Atlantis, has conquered Valusia and become its King. Kull is invited to a feast by the Pictish ambassador for Valusia, Ka-nu the Ancient. Despite the fact that the Picts are ancient enemies of the Atlanteans, Ka-nu confides in Kull and tells him to expect the arrival of Brule the Spear-Slayer around sunset.

In the early night, Brule climbs into Kull's bedroom, identifying himself with a "bracelet of gold representing a winged dragon coiled thrice, with three horns of ruby on the head" which had been shown to Kull at the feast. Brule explains that Kull's life is in danger and shows him a series of secret passages which riddle the palace. Soon, Kull sees that the guards outside his room are all unconscious and their bodies hidden, although they still seem to be on guard at the same time. Chief Councillor Tu arrives, planning to assassinate the sleeping King, but meets him awake and armed; it was, however, not the real Tu, but a serpent man who had taken on his appearance.

Brule reveals that the Serpent Men, an ancient pre-human race who had founded Valusia but were almost extinct, rule from the shadows, using their Snake Cult religion and ability to disguise themselves with magic. They intended to replace Kull with a disguised Serpent Man, just as they had done with his predecessors.

The next day, the Serpent Men again attempt to replace Kull. He and Brule are, through an illusion, tricked into a separate room instead of the real council, surrounded by Serpent Men disguised as the councillors. Kull realizes the trap in time, however, and the two barely defeat their opponents. Heading into the real Council Room, they see another Kull. The imposter Kull is killed by the real one, revealing the fake as a Serpent Man and also revealing the truth of the existence of Serpent Men in general. The story ends with Kull's oath to hunt and destroy the Serpent Men for good.

== Style ==
The subjects of masks and identity are repeated throughout the story. The most obvious instance of this is the Serpent Men's ability of disguise through magic and their use of this to steal identities at will.

Kull, as a barbarian, sees the diplomacy and politics of Valusia (and the others of the Seven Empires) as a form of illusion. Early in the story, before the Serpent Men appear, Kull's thoughts on the matter are described:

Strange to him were the intrigues of court and palace, army and people. All was like a masquerade, where men and women hid their real thoughts with a smooth mask.

Musing on his own identity later in the story, Kull extends the mask metaphor to himself:

Was it the real Kull who sat upon the throne or was it the real Kull who had scaled the hills of Atlantis, harried the far isles of the sunset, and laughed upon the green roaring tides of the Atlantean sea? How could a man be so many different men in a lifetime? For Kull knew that there were many Kulls and he wondered which was the real Kull. After all, the priests of the Serpent went a step further in their magic, for all men wore masks, and many a different mask with each different man or woman; and Kull wondered if a serpent did not lurk under every mask.

This is touched on again shortly afterwards when, on seeing a Serpent Man masquerading as himself, Kull is momentarily confused:

He stepped back, his mind reeling. "This is insanity!" he whispered. "Am I Kull? Do I stand here or is that Kull yonder in very truth, and am I but a shadow, a figment of thought?"

== Reception ==
After the publication of "The Shadow Kingdom", Weird Tales received several letters from readers lauding the story. "The Shadow Kingdom" was later voted the most popular story of the August 1929 issue in a poll of Weird Tales readers.

Robert Weinberg praised "The Shadow Kingdom" as "an exciting novelette of swords-and-sorcery".

Fantasy historian Morgan T. Holmes has stated that ""The Shadow" Kingdom" has been regarded by many as the first true sword and sorcery story because of the main character, setting and atmosphere...Gone is any connection to history; the setting is purely fantastic." Writer Brian Murphy notes that "The Shadow Kingdom" is the first story to depict a barbarian warrior fighting against supernatural evil, in a world of the writer's imagination. He also points out that the story's popularity encouraged Howard to write more stories in a similar vein, about both Kull and Conan.

== Adaptions ==
The story has been adapted in the following comic books:

- Kull the Conqueror #2, September 1971 (Marvel Comics). Written by Roy Thomas, penciled by Marie Severin, inked by John Severin.
- Kull #2, December 2008 (Dark Horse Comics). Written by Arvid Nelson, art by Will Conrad
- The Shadow Kingdom, 2024 (Arrow Comics). Written by Randy Zimmerman, art by Russ Leach.

== See also ==
- Reptilian conspiracy theory — Robert E. Howard's short story "The Shadow Kingdom" from Weird Tales magazine is the origin of both the sword and sorcery subgenre of fantasy fiction and the conspiracy theory concerning a hidden species of advanced reptilian beings disguised among us while covertly controlling the levers of power, which has been a recurring theme in fiction and conspiracy since the story's publication.
- Snake Men from Masters of the Universe
- Yuan-ti from Dungeons & Dragons
- Snake People from the TV movie The Archer: Fugitive from the Empire
- Reptilian humanoids in fiction
