= The Haunter of the Ring =

- Short story by Robert E. Howard
- Country: United States
- Language: English
- Genre: Lovecraftian horror

Publication
- Published in: Weird Tales
- Media type: Pulp magazine
- Publication date: June 1934
- Series: John Kirowan; Cthulhu Mythos

"The Haunter of the Ring" is a 1934 short story by American writer Robert E. Howard, belonging to the Cthulhu Mythos. It was first published in the pulp magazine Weird Tales in the June 1934 issue. Howard earned $60 for this publication. This story is set in the modern age but includes a relic from the Hyborian Age of the Conan the Barbarian stories, the ring of Thoth-Amon.

== Plot ==
Evelyn Gordon has tried on three occasions to murder her newly wed husband, James Gordon, although she has no memory of doing so after the event. James believes that she may be the reincarnation of Elizabeth Douglas, the wife of his ancestor, Richard Gordon, who murdered her out of jealousy; and the attempts on his life are the result of her vengeance on the family line. Evelyn has also, however, recently received a present from her spurned lover, Joseph Roelocke, as a peace offering - a copper ring "made like a scaly snake coiled three times, with its tail in its mouth and yellow jewels for eyes." James believes Roelocke found the ring somewhere in Hungary.

On hearing this story, and viewing the circumstances themselves, John Kirowan becomes suspicious. Following another attempt on James Gordon's life, Kirowan confronts Roelocke and the mystery is explained. Roelocke is really Yosef Vrolok, an old enemy of Kirowan. Kirowan identified the ring as "the ancient and accursed ring of Thoth-Amon, handed down by foul cults of sorcerers since the days of forgotten Stygia"

In revenge against Evelyn, Vrolok used black magic to summon a "black elemental spirit" (also "the nameless shape that roams the gulfs of Darkness") to possess her and force her to kill her husband, although it can only manage to do this on brief occasions. His plan backfires, however, as he promised the spirit the soul of either Evelyn or James Gordon in payment for its services. Kirowan convinces him that, as he had no authority to give their souls, the spirit will come for Vrolok's soul instead. Despite the fact that the spirit's task has not yet been completed, this gambit weakens Vrolok's control enough that the spirit is able to take advantage and, indeed, Vrolok's soul.

== Links to Conan ==
The Serpent Ring of Set was introduced in the very first Conan story, The Phoenix on the Sword with a similar description. In that story, it is reclaimed by its most famous owner, the Stygian wizard Thoth-Amon, who is named as such in this story. This establishes a link between the Conan and Kirowan stories, and through them links to many other works by Robert E. Howard, including Kull and Bran Mak Morn.
