= The Mirrors of Tuzun Thune =

Short story by Robert E. Howard

- Short story by Robert E. Howard
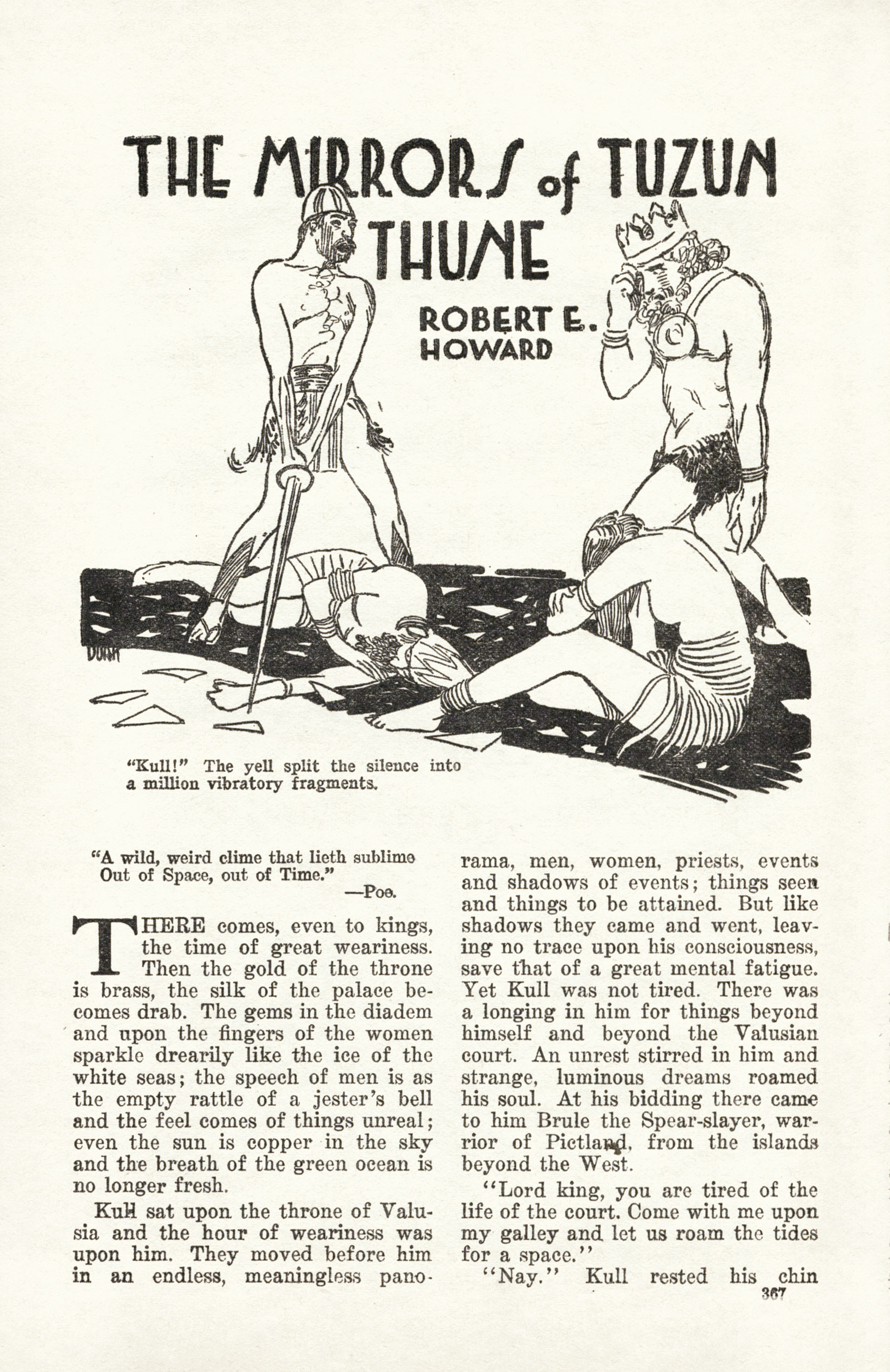
- Title page of "The Mirrors of Tuzun Thune" as it appeared in Weird Tales, September 1929. Illustration by Hugh Doak Rankin.
- Country: United States
- Language: English
- Genre: Sword and sorcery

Publication
- Published in: Weird Tales
- Publication date: September 1929
- Series: Kull

"The Mirrors of Tuzun Thune" is a fantasy short story by American author Robert E. Howard, one of his original short stories about Kull of Atlantis, first published in Weird Tales magazine c. 1929. It is one of only three Kull stories to be published in Howard's lifetime.

Set in the fictional prehistoric Thurian Age, it deals with a disillusioned King Kull questioning the meaning of existence, leading him to seek the assistance of a two-faced wizard.

== Plot ==
Kull, King of Valusia, suffers from a severe depression from which not even his friend and ally, Brule the Spear-slayer, can rouse him. A mysterious woman later whispers to Kull that he should visit Tuzun Thune, a wizard of the Elder Race, who supposedly knows the secrets of life. Kull is intrigued, and set off at once.

Kull arrives at the wizard's lair, known as the House of a Thousand Mirrors, and the two begin their discussion. To Kull's questions regarding the legitimacy of his powers, Tuzun Thune simply offers him an evasive answer. Disappointed, Kull states how he views Thune as just an ordinary man. However, Thune points out that all men, from kings to wizards, are just ordinary men.

Tuzun Thune guides Kull deeper into his laboratory and shows him a hall of mirrors. One, the wizard claims, is crafted from the "Deepest Magic". However, when Kull looks into the mirror, all he sees is his own reflection. He then begins to wonder if he himself is only a mirror image, and the man in the mirror is the true Kull, and he longs to visit this "truer" world.

Kull leaves, but returns day after day to stare into this mirror. Affairs of his state are being neglected, and the subjects are beginning to worry about their king. Still, Kull doesn't care. Soon, Kull begins to feel himself slipping into this mirror realm. Suddenly, Kull hears someone call his name and the mirror shatters. Brule has arrived and killed Tuzun Thune.

Brule explains how Thune was involved in a plot to kill the king, as was the woman who first suggested Kull visit the wizard. Kull asks why a wizard with power over dimensions would be involved in a play for political power. Brule points out that all men, from kings to wizards, are just ordinary men.

However, Brule says that when he arrived, he could see Kull actually dissolving into the mirror. Kull wonders if Thune actually did place a powerful spell over him, or if he managed to break the bonds of reality all on his own.

The two leave Thune's corpse where it lies, and go. But for the rest of his life, Kull is haunted by questions about what really happened to him in Thune's mirror, and they leave him even less certain about the nature of reality.

== Adaptations ==
This story was included in a Conan story by Marvel Comics in Conan the Barbarian #25 ("The Mirrors of Kharam-Akkad", Apr 1973). It was adapted again, more at length, is the September 1978 issue of "The Savage Sword of Conan" (issue #34).
