= Stewart Cowley =

British writer and artist (born 1947)

Stewart Cowley (born 1947) (also Steven Caldwell, Hubert Venables) is a British writer and artist, best known for his works in the "Terran Trade Authority" universe.

== Terran Trade Authority ==
The original four books are:

- Spacecraft 2000-2100 AD (by Stewart Cowley, 1978) (UK ISBN 060038439X and US ISBN 0890092117 Editions) [SC1]
- Great Space Battles (by Stewart Cowley and Charles Herridge, 1979) (UK ISBN 0600383687/US ISBN 0890092605) [GSB]
- SpaceWreck: Ghost Ships and Derelicts of Space (by Stewart Cowley, 1979) (UK ISBN 0600329909/US ISBN 0896730220) [SW]
- Starliners: Commercial Travel in 2200 AD (by Stewart Cowley, 1980) (UK ISBN 0600353575/US ISBN 0896730700) [SL]

In addition, the books Spacecraft 2000-2100 AD and Great Space Battles were collected together and published as Spacebase 2000 (1984, UK ISBN 0600385469/US ISBN 0312749406).

In 2005-2006 the series was republished as:

- Spacecraft 2100 to 2200 AD (by K. Scott Agnew, Jeff Lilly & Stewart Cowley) (July–August 2006) (Book info ISBN 097801510X) [SC2]
- Local Space: A Guide to the TTA Universe (October 2006)
- The Terran Trade Authority Roleplaying Game (by K. Scott Agnew & Jeff Lilly, with foreword by Stewart Cowley) (October 2006) (Book info ISBN 0978015118) (Now out of Print)
- The Terran Trade Authority: The Proxima War, Role Playing Game (by Jeff Lilly and Jonathan M. Thompson, foreword by Stewart Cowley) (2014) Published by Battlefield Press International

=== Reception ===
Composer Jonn Serrie cited the series as an inspiration for a number of his own works, and said the art in the series, "came from the portfolios of some of the finest space artists in the world".

=== Foreign language editions ===
The books were published in many languages.

==== French ====
No information yet available.

==== German ====
The series was published 1981 under the name "Der große galaktische Krieg" (The great galactic war) by Condor Verlag which also published Marvel Comics in the 70s and 80s. 1. Die Schlacht im Weltraum (The battle in space) (1981) 2. Der Kampf zwischen den Sternen (The battle between the stars) (1981) 3. Die Kampfraumer des Imperiums (The battlecruisers of the empire) (1981) 4. Vorstoß in die Galaxis (1981?) 5. Die Eroberung der Galaxis (1982) 6. Die stählernen Festungen zwischen den Sternen (1982) 7. Die Beherrscher der Galaxis (1982) 8. Die Sternenkämpfer der Raumpatrouille (1983)

by Albatros Verlag AG, CH-8702 Zollikon, "Im Weltall - Die Raumschiffe der Jahre 2000 - 2100 n.Chr" (1979), ISBN 3-715609985

==== Swedish ====
- Spacecraft 2000-2100 AD as Terranska handelsstyrelsen. Rymdfarkoster 2000 till 2100. ISBN 9789185500161
- Great Space Battles as Terranska handelsstyrelsen: De stora rymdkrigen 2000 till 2100. ISBN 9789185500178

== Galactic Encounters ==
This series of six books was written by Stewart Cowley under the pseudonym "Steven Caldwell", for Intercontinental Book Productions (republished by Crescent Books in the US). The Galactic Encounters series was set in roughly the same universe as the official TTA books and was created partly using art rejected for inclusion in the official TTA books.

- Aliens in Space: An illustrated guide to the inhabited Galaxy (1979, UK ISBN 0850474507/US ISBN 0517292238)
- Star Quest: An incredible voyage into the unknown (1979, UK ISBN 0850474515/US ISBN 0517292246)
- The Fantastic Planet: A World of Magic and Mystery (1980, UK ISBN 0850474523/US ISBN 0517292254)
- Dangerous Frontiers: the fight for survival on distant worlds (1980, UK ISBN 0850474531) (Printed as Settlers in Space: The fight for survival on distant worlds in the US ISBN 0517292262)
- Worlds at War: An Illustrated Study of Interplanetary Conflict (1980, UK ISBN 085047454X/US ISBN 0517292270)
- Space Patrol: The Official Guide to the Galactic Security Force (1980, UK ISBN 0850474558/US ISBN 0517292289)

== Spin Off ==
- The Space Warriors (1980, UK ISBN 0603001971)
