= Sword and sorcery =

Genre of fantasy fiction

Sword and sorcery (S&S), or heroic fantasy, is a sub-genre of fantasy literature characterized by sword-wielding heroes engaged in exciting and violent adventures. Elements of romance, magic, and the supernatural are also often present. Unlike works of high fantasy, the tales, though dramatic, focus on personal battles rather than world-endangering matters. The genre originated from the early 1930s works of Robert E. Howard. In parallel with "sword and sorcery", the term "heroic fantasy" is used, although it is a more loosely defined genre. Science fiction author Isaac Asimov once stated in his own Science Fiction Magazine that "The contemporary Sword-and-Sorcery tale owes its existence to the imagination of Robert Howard and his invention of the Conan stories."

Sword and sorcery tales eschew overarching themes of "good vs evil" in favor of situational conflicts that often pit morally gray characters against one another to enrich themselves, or to defy tyranny.

Sword and sorcery is grounded in real-world social and societal hierarchies, and is grittier, darker, and more violent, with elements of cosmic or Lovecraftian creatures that are not a staple of mainstream fantasy. The main character is often a barbarian with antihero traits.

== Etymology ==
The website Historical Dictionary of Science Fiction records an example of "sword and sorcery" from 1953, where it appears in a headline of a review of an L. Sprague de Camp novel. In the 6 April 1961 issue of the fantasy fanzine Ancalagon, American author Fritz Leiber re-coined the term in response to a letter from British author Michael Moorcock in the fanzine Amra, demanding a name for the sort of fantasy-adventure story written by Robert E. Howard. Moorcock had initially proposed the term "epic fantasy". Leiber replied in the journal Ancalagon (6 April 1961), suggesting "sword-and-sorcery as a good popular catchphrase for the field". He expanded on this in the July 1961 issue of Amra, commenting:

I feel more certain than ever that this field should be called the sword-and-sorcery story. This accurately describes the points of culture-level and supernatural element and also immediately distinguishes it from the cloak-and-sword (historical adventure) story—and (quite incidentally) from the cloak-and-dagger (international espionage) story too!

The term "heroic fantasy" has been used to avoid the garish overtones of "sword and sorcery". This name was coined by L. Sprague de Camp. However, it has also been used to describe a broader range of fantasy, including High fantasy.

== Definitions ==
In the introduction to his 1973 anthology Flashing Swords! 1, fantasy editor Lin Carter gave this definition of the sub-genre: "We call a story Sword & Sorcery when it is an action tale, derived from the traditions of the pulp magazine adventure story, set in a land, age or world of the author's invention–a milieu in which magic actually works and the gods are real—a story, moreover, which pits a stalwart warrior in direct conflict with the forces of supernatural evil." Science fiction historian Darrell Schweitzer has given another definition of sword and sorcery fiction: "In its broadest sense, a sword & sorcery story is one about heroic adventures, in a primitive or imaginary-world setting, with supernatural elements". Fantasy historian Brian Murphy has put forward another exposition of the sub-genre. Murphy writes that a sword and sorcery narrative "typically features men (and occasionally women) of action, pitted against enemies wielding dark and dangerous magic, in pursuit of personal and/or mercenary aims."

== Style and themes ==
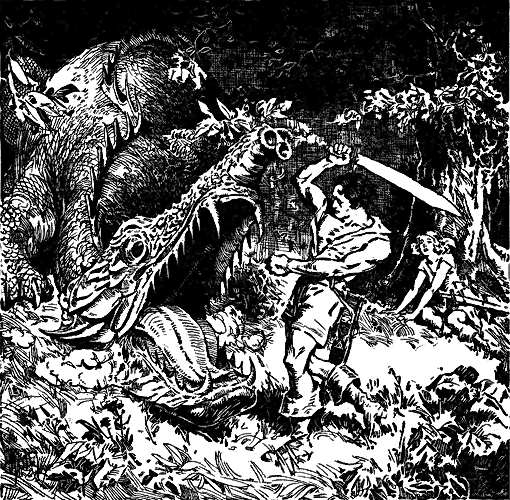
Illustration of a scene in Robert E. Howard's Conan the Barbarian story "Red Nails"

Heavily influenced by the adventure genre, the settings of sword and sorcery often revolve around Alternate history, pulling influences from early 20th century Archaeology and Theosophy. The setting can be an Earth in the mythical past or distant future, an imaginary other world or an alien planet. Sword and sorcery stories are also influenced by Horror, Mythology, Folklore, and Science Fiction. The technological level of most sword and sorcery settings is similar to that of the ancient or medieval periods with an emphasis on swordplay.

The Protagonist is usually an antihero who fights against supernatural evil and the occult. Unlike fantasy, the magic of a sword and sorcery story comes at a substantial cost, or what can be described as a hard magic system. Although the main character mostly behaves heroically, he may ally with an enemy or sacrifice an ally in order to survive. A hero's main weapons are cunning and physical strength. Magic, on the other hand, is usually only used by the villains of the story, who are usually wizards, witches, or supernatural monsters. A recurring theme in the genre is a damsel in distress. Although Robert E. Howard was known for writing strong female protagonists such as Agnes and Valeria, the 1960s onward saw an emphasis on male protagonists and underdeveloped female characters by the popular authors of the time. This issue has declined in recent years.

In his introduction to the 1967 Ace edition of Conan the Barbarian, L. Sprague de Camp described the typical sword and sorcery story as:

[A] story of action and adventure laid in a more or less imaginary world, where magic works and where modern science and technology have not yet been discovered. The setting may (as in the Conan stories) be this Earth as it is conceived to have been long ago, or as it will be in the remote future, or it may be another planet or another dimension.

Such a story combines the color and dash of the historical costume romance with the atavistic supernatural thrills of the weird, occult, or ghost story. When well done, it provides the purest fun of fiction of any kind. It is escape fiction wherein one escapes clear out of the real world into one where all men are strong, all women beautiful, all life adventurous, and all problems simple, and nobody even mentions the income tax or the dropout problem or socialized medicine.

Sprague de Camp has since received considerable backlash from the modern sword and sorcery community for fueling misconceptions about the purpose and style of the genre. Organizations such as the Robert E. Howard Foundation and various fanzines have worked to elevate the embedded themes of social criticism and indicate the academic importance of the genre's relevance to the development of existentialist literature.

Many sword and sorcery tales have turned into lengthy series of adventures.

Sword and sorcery experiences crossover with dark fantasy. The scale of the struggles depicted is smaller, and the main character usually pursues personal gain, such as wealth or love. The opposition between good and evil characteristic of fantasy also exists in Sword and Sorcery literature, but it is less absolute and the events often take place in a morally gray area. These features are especially emphasized in newer works of the genre. The stories are fast-paced and action-oriented, with lots of violent fight scenes. Like most speculative fiction, Sword and Sorcery has been criticized for its over employment of the Deus ex machina trope.

Writers such as Howard, Michael Moorcock and Samuel R. Delany have used the Sword and Sorcery genre to address serious themes such as Assisted suicide, fascism, liberty, anti-slavery, sex trafficking, criticism of organized religion, and the cyclical rise and fall of civilization. Sword and sorcery is most well known for its discussion of agency and employment of ideas related to conflict theory. While sword and sorcery employs a wide variety of narrative conflicts, the most typical structure is Man vs Man, presented in the context of Man vs Society or Man vs God, wherein the villain of the story is a symbolic representation of a greater evil.

A quote from The Alexandrian summarizes a core theme found within sword and sorcery:

"The mythic root of these stories is Robin Hood, whose idyllic society of Merry Men living in the barbarism of Sherwood Forest achieves the ideals of chivalry and nobility which are falsely claimed by the corrupt powers of "civilization." ...Where civilization fails to protect the innocent (and is, in fact, often the ones victimizing them), it is the "outsider" that civilization teaches you to fear that will ultimately sacrifice to help those in need."

== History ==
=== Origins ===
In his introduction to the reference Literary Swordsmen and Sorcerers by L. Sprague de Camp, Lin Carter notes that the heritage of sword and sorcery is illustrious, and can be traced back to mythology, including the labors of Hercules, as well as to classical epics such as Homer's Odyssey, the Norse sagas, and Arthurian legend.

It also has been influenced by historical fiction. For instance, the work of Sir Walter Scott was influenced by Scottish folklore and ballads. Yet few of Scott's stories contain fantastic elements; in most, the appearance of such is explained away. Sword and sorcery's immediate progenitors are the swashbuckling tales of Alexandre Dumas, père (The Three Musketeers (1844), etc.), Rafael Sabatini (Scaramouche (1921), etc.) and their pulp magazine imitators, such as Talbot Mundy, Harold Lamb, and H. Bedford-Jones, who all influenced Howard. Mundy in particular, proved influential: early sword and sorcery writers such as Howard, C. L. Moore and Fritz Leiber were admirers of Mundy's fiction. However, these historical "swashbucklers" lack the supernatural element which defines the genre.

Sword and sorcery's focus on adventurers exploring a strange society were influenced by adventures set in foreign lands by Sir H. Rider Haggard and Edgar Rice Burroughs. Haggard's works, such as King Solomon's Mines (1885) and She: A History of Adventure (1887) included many fantastic elements. Some of Haggard's characters, such as Umslopogaas, an axe-wielding Zulu warrior who encountered supernatural phenomena and loved to fight, bore similarities to sword and sorcery heroes. Haggard also wrote Eric Brighteyes (1891), a violent historical novel based on the Icelandic Sagas; some writers, (such as David Pringle) have stated that Eric Brighteyes resembles a modern sword and sorcery novel. Edgar Rice Burroughs' novels featured physically formidable male heroes such as Tarzan and John Carter of Mars. Burroughs' heroes had adventures involving the exploration of strange regions and battles with fearsome creatures. Burroughs' work was enormously influential on the initial generation of American sword and sorcery writers, such as Robert E. Howard.

Yet another influence was early fantasy fiction. This type of fiction includes the short stories of Lord Dunsany's such as "The Fortress Unvanquishable, Save for Sacnoth" (1910) and "The Distressing Tale of Thangobrind the Jeweller" (1911). These works of Dunsany's feature warriors who clash with monsters and wizards in realms of Dunsany's creation. Dunsany's work proved inspirational to C. L. Moore, Fritz Leiber, Jack Vance, and Karl Edward Wagner. The Worm Ouroboros (1922) by E. R. Eddison, a heroic romance written in a mock-archaic style, was an inspiration to later writers of sword and sorcery such as Leiber. The "Poictesme" novels of James Branch Cabell, such as Jurgen: A Comedy of Justice (1919), have been cited as a stimulus to early sword and sorcery writing. Cabell's novels depict picaresque exploits in imaginary lands, and were an influence on Leiber and Vance. A. Merritt's novels The Ship of Ishtar (1924) and Dwellers in the Mirage (1932) have also been cited as influences on sword and sorcery, as they feature men from the then-contemporary world being drawn into dangerous adventures involving swordplay and magic. All these authors influenced sword and sorcery for the plots, characters, and landscapes used.

Also, many early sword and sorcery writers, such as Howard and Clark Ashton Smith, were influenced by the Middle Eastern tales of the Arabian Nights, whose stories of magical monsters and evil sorcerers were an influence on the genre-to-be.

Sword and sorcery's frequent depictions of smoky taverns and fetid back alleys draw upon the picaresque genre; for example, Rachel Bingham notes that Fritz Leiber's city of Lankhmar bears considerable similarity to 16th century Seville as depicted in Miguel de Cervantes' tale "Rinconete y Cortadillo".

Sword and sorcery proper only truly began in the pulp fantasy magazines, where it emerged from "weird fiction". Writers such as Edgar Allan Poe, Arthur Machen, Robert W. Chambers and H. P. Lovecraft wrote works of fiction which featured elements such as haunted edifices, sinister occultists and disturbing monsters. These "weird fiction" writers were read by the first generation of sword and sorcery authors, and elements from the "weird fiction" writers (such as the monstrous creatures) reappeared in the early works of sword and sorcery. Lovecraft's fiction (especially his "Dream Cycle" of Dunsany-inspired fantasy stories) was a source of particularly strong inspiration for the first generation of sword and sorcery writers. The magazine Weird Tales, which published Howard's Conan stories and C. L. Moore's Jirel of Joiry tales, as well as key influences like H. P. Lovecraft and Smith, was especially important.

The 1929 Weird Tales story "The Shadow Kingdom" by Robert E. Howard is often regarded as the first true "sword and sorcery" tale, because it pits a heroic warrior (Kull of Atlantis) against supernatural evil, in an imaginary world of the writer's devising.

Howard published only three stories featuring Kull in Weird Tales. He revised an unsold Kull story, "By This Axe I Rule!" into "The Phoenix on the Sword", which introduced a new character, Conan the Barbarian. When "The Phoenix on the Sword" was published in 1932, it proved popular with the Weird Tales readers, and Howard wrote more tales of Conan, of which 17 were published in the magazine.

=== Development ===
The success of Howard's work encouraged other Weird Tales writers to create similar tales of adventure in imagined lands. Clark Ashton Smith wrote his tales of the Hyperborean cycle and Zothique for Weird Tales in the 1930s. These stories revolved around the exploits of warriors and sorcerers in lands of the remote past or remote future, and often had downbeat endings. C. L. Moore, inspired by Howard, Smith and H. P. Lovecraft, created the Jirel of Joiry stories for Weird Tales, which brought in the first sword and sorcery heroine. Moore's future husband Henry Kuttner created Elak of Atlantis, a Howard-inspired warrior hero, for Weird Tales in 1938.

Following a change of ownership in 1940, Weird Tales ceased to publish sword and sorcery stories. However, the pulp magazine Unknown Worlds continued to publish sword and sorcery fiction by Fritz Leiber and Norvell W. Page. Leiber's stories revolved around a duo of heroes called Fafhrd and the Gray Mouser, and dealt with their adventures in the world of Nehwon ("No-When" backwards). Leiber's stories featured more emphasis on characterisation and humour than previous sword and sorcery fiction, and his characters became popular with Unknown's readers. Page's sword and sorcery tales centred on Prester John, a Howard-inspired gladiator adventurer, whose exploits took place in Central Asia in the first century CE.

With the diminution of pulp magazine sales in the late 1940s, the focus of sword and sorcery shifted to small-press books. Arkham House published collections by Robert E. Howard, Clark Ashton Smith and Fritz Leiber that included some of their sword and sorcery work. Writer Jack Vance published the book The Dying Earth in 1950. The Dying Earth described the adventures of rogues and wizards on a decadent far-future Earth, where magic had replaced science.

=== Rise in popularity ===
In the 1960s, American paperback publisher Lancer Books began to reissue Robert E. Howard's Conan stories in paperback, with cover illustrations by artist Frank Frazetta. These editions became surprise bestsellers, selling millions of copies to a largely young readership. The commercial success of the Conan books encouraged other publishers to put out new and reprinted books in the style of Howard's work.

Initial works in the 1960s by other authors closely followed the Conan mould, with Lin Carter's Thongor of Lemuria, Gardner F. Fox's Kothar the Barbarian, and John Jakes' Brak the Barbarian being the most popular of the imitators. Notably different works were Michael Moorcock's Elric of Melnibone stories, which were designed to be in counterpoint with the barbarian trope, and the revival of interest in the original Fafhrd & Gray Mouser stories with their focus on urbane rogues, by Fritz Leiber led to Leiber writing new stories with the characters that he would periodically revisit throughout the 1970s and 1980s.

Despite this, the initial barbarian-focused boom crashed in the early seventies, before the mid-1970s led to newer, more varied authors and books being published with it, such as Andre Norton, David Drake, Tanith Lee, Charles R. Saunders, Michael Shea, Karl Edward Wagner, and others.

From the 1960s until the 1980s, under the guiding force of Carter, a select group of writers formed the Swordsmen and Sorcerers' Guild of America (SAGA) to promote and enlarge the sword and sorcery genre. From 1973 to 1981, five anthologies featuring short works by SAGA members were published. Edited by Carter, these were collectively known as Flashing Swords! Because of these and other anthologies, such as the Ballantine Adult Fantasy series, his own fiction, and his criticism, Carter is considered one of the most important popularizers of genre fantasy in general, and S&S in particular.

Despite such authors' efforts, some critics use sword and sorcery as a dismissive or pejorative term. During the 1980s, influenced by the success of the 1982 feature film Conan the Barbarian, many fantasy films, some cheaply made, were released in a subgenre that would be called "sword and sorcery".

The sword and sorcery boom is said to have begun with Hawk the Slayer (1980). Other examples of sword and sorcery films include The Beastmaster (1982), The Sword and the Sorcerer (1982), Hercules (1983), a Conan sequel, Conan the Destroyer (1984), Ladyhawke (1985) and Red Sonja (1985), which, like the Conan films, also stars Arnold Schwarzenegger. The sword and planet film Masters of the Universe (1987) contains elements of sword and sorcery and has been called a Conan hybrid.

Clash of the Titans (1981), Excalibur (1981), Dragonslayer (1981), and Krull (1983) are characterised as sword and sorcery films by some writers, but this is disputed by Butler. Star Wars (1977) was influenced by sword and sorcery, and in turn influenced Legend of the Eight Samurai (1983), a Japanese sword and sorcery style film.

After the cinema and literary boom of the early to mid-1980s, sword and sorcery once again dropped out of favor, with epic fantasy largely taking its place in the fantasy genre. There was, though, another resurgence in sword and sorcery at the end of the 20th century. Sometimes called the "new" or "literary" sword and sorcery, this development places emphasis on literary technique, and draws from epic fantasy and other genres to broaden the genre's typical scope. Stories may feature the wide-ranging struggles of national or world-spanning concerns common to high fantasy, but told from the point of view of characters more common to S&S, and with the sense of adventure common to the latter. Writers associated with this include Steven Erikson, Joe Abercrombie, and Scott Lynch, magazines such as Black Gate and the ezines Flashing Swords (not to be confused with the Lin Carter anthologies), and Beneath Ceaseless Skies publish short fiction in the style. According to the literary critic Higashi Masao regarding Japanese works Guin Saga and Sorcerous Stabber Orphen, they were initially planned by their authors as novels that could be classified as belonging to the European sword and sorcery subgenre but had various major elements that distanced themselves from the typical novels in the genre.

In the 1990s, sword and sorcery boomed in popularity in Great Britain and other parts of the world.

== Women creators and characters ==
Robert E. Howard espoused feminist views in his personal and professional life. He wrote to his friends and associates defending the achievements and capabilities of women. Strong female characters in Howard's works of fiction include Dark Agnes de Chastillon (first appearing in "Sword Woman", circa 1932–34), the early modern pirate Helen Tavrel ("The Isle of Pirates' Doom", 1928), as well as two pirates and Conan the Barbarian supporting characters, Bêlit ("Queen of the Black Coast", 1934), and Valeria of the Red Brotherhood ("Red Nails", 1936).

Introduced as the co-star in a non-fantasy historical story by Howard entitled "The Shadow of the Vulture", Red Sonya of Rogatino later inspired a fantasy heroine named Red Sonja, who first appeared in the comic book series Conan the Barbarian written by Roy Thomas and illustrated by Barry Windsor-Smith. Red Sonja became the subject of a comic book and eventually a series of novels by David C. Smith and Richard L. Tierney, as well as Richard Fleischer's film adaptation in 1985.

Catherine Moore was another foundational author of the sword and sorcery genre during its earliest years with her Jirel of Joiry stories. Several other women lead the beginnings of this genre, including Leigh Brackett, Nathalie Henneberg, and Andre Norton.

Despite this, sword and sorcery has been criticized for having a masculine bias; This includes criticism of the aforementioned authors. Female characters were often distressed damsels to be rescued or protected, or otherwise served as a reward for a male hero's adventures. Those who had adventures of their own often did so to counter the threat of rape or to take revenge for it. These issues were particularly relevant in the 1960s through the late 1980s, but are often characteristic of even some of the earliest Sword and Sorcery stories.

Tanith Lee's 1975 novel The Birthgrave and later novels focused on women's roles in standard sword and sorcery era narratives. The Morgaine cycle of novels from C. J. Cherryh, which began in 1976, also focused on a female lead while engaging in a traditional heroic fantasy lead. This led to them and other female authors being inducted into Lin Carter's Swordsmen and Sorcerers' Guild of America.

Jessica Amanda Salmonson similarly sought to broaden the range of roles for female characters in sword and sorcery through her own stories and through editing the World Fantasy Award-winning Amazons (1979) and Amazons II (1982) anthologies; both drew on real and folkloric female warriors, often from outside of Europe.

Marion Zimmer Bradley's Sword and Sorceress anthology series (1984 onwards) challenged these archetypes. The stories feature skillful swordswomen and powerful sorceresses working from a variety of motives.

== See also ==
- Elak of Atlantis
- Planetary romance
- Xianxia — the Chinese equivalent of Western sword and sorcery fantasy literatures
- Shenmo — a more high-magic Chinese fantasy genre centered on deities, demons and other powerful supernatural beings such as spirits and monsters
- List of sword-and-sorcery films
