= Dark Agnes de Chastillon =

Fictional character created by Robert E. Howard

Dark Agnes de Chastillon (also known as Agnes de Chastillon, Dark Agnes, Agnes de la Fere and The Sword Woman) is a fictional character created by Robert E. Howard and the protagonist of three stories set in 16th century France, which were not printed until long after the author's death.

The character of Agnes was beaten by her father and almost forced into an arranged marriage. She escapes by killing the bridegroom and running away. She meets Etienne Villiers, who at first attempts to sell her to a brothel, and Guiscard de Clisson, a mercenary captain who trains her as a swordswoman. When de Clisson is killed, Agnes heads for Italy with Villiers.

Agnes has red hair and a short temper, and her skill with swords is a mixture of innate talent and training.

The character may be partially based on Novalyne Price, an American schoolteacher and writer who became close friends with, and occasionally dated, Robert E. Howard. Fictional prototypes include Jirel of Joiry, created by C. L. Moore. Moore was enthusiastic about the first of Howard's "Dark Agnes" stories:

My blessings! I can’t tell you how much I enjoyed "Sword-Woman". It seemed such a pity to leave her just at the threshold of higher adventures. Your favorite trick of slamming the door on a burst of bugles! And leaving one to wonder what happened next and wanting so badly to know. Aren’t there any more stories about Agnes?

== Stories ==
Robert E. Howard wrote two complete Dark Agnes de Chastillon stories and a partial first draft for a third story.

=== "Sword Woman" ===
This is the origin story for Agnes. It features her abortive arranged marriage and subsequent training. "Sword Woman" was first published in REH: Lone Star Fictioneer #2 (Summer 1975).

=== "Blades for France" ===
Agnes, still with her sidekick Etienne Villiers, faces international intrigue with Cardinal Thomas Wolsey. "Blades for France" was first published in Blades for France (1975).

=== "Mistress of Death" ===
Howard only wrote two drafts of "Mistress of Death", both incomplete. The second of the two drafts was later completed by Gerald W. Page and it was this version that was first published in Witchcraft & Sorcery Volume 1 Number 5 (January–February 1971). This is the only Dark Agnes story to include a fantasy element, in the form of a sorcerer. It is not written to the same standard of the two stories Howard completed, and features some departures from the established character, making her more stereotypically feminine.

It was later adapted into a Conan tale, "Curse of the Undead-Man", appearing in The Savage Sword of Conan no. 1, 1974, where the Cimmerian encounters Red Sonja (in place of Dark Agnes).

== Collections ==
All three Agnes stories, together with the unrelated "The King's Service" and "The Shadow of the Hun" (a Turlogh Dubh O'Brien story), and an introduction by Leigh Brackett, were collected in:

- Howard, Robert E. (May 1977). Sword Woman. Zebra. ISBN 0-89083-261-7.
- Howard, Robert E. (1979) [1977]. Sword Woman. Berkley. ISBN 978-0-425-04445-2.
- Howard, Robert E. (October 1986) [1977]. Sword Woman. Ace. ISBN 0-441-79279-0.

The Zebra edition had cover art and illustrations by Stephen Fabian. The Berkley and Ace editions had cover art by Ken Kelly.

== Other media ==
In February 2020, Marvel Comics launched a comic book series titled Dark Agnes, featuring an original story written by Becky Cloonan with art by Luca Pizzari. The series ran for two issues before being cancelled due to the COVID-19 pandemic.

Conan rights holders Heroic Signatures have announced plans for additional comic books featuring Dark Agnes
