= Kull of Atlantis =

Fictional character by Robert E. Howard

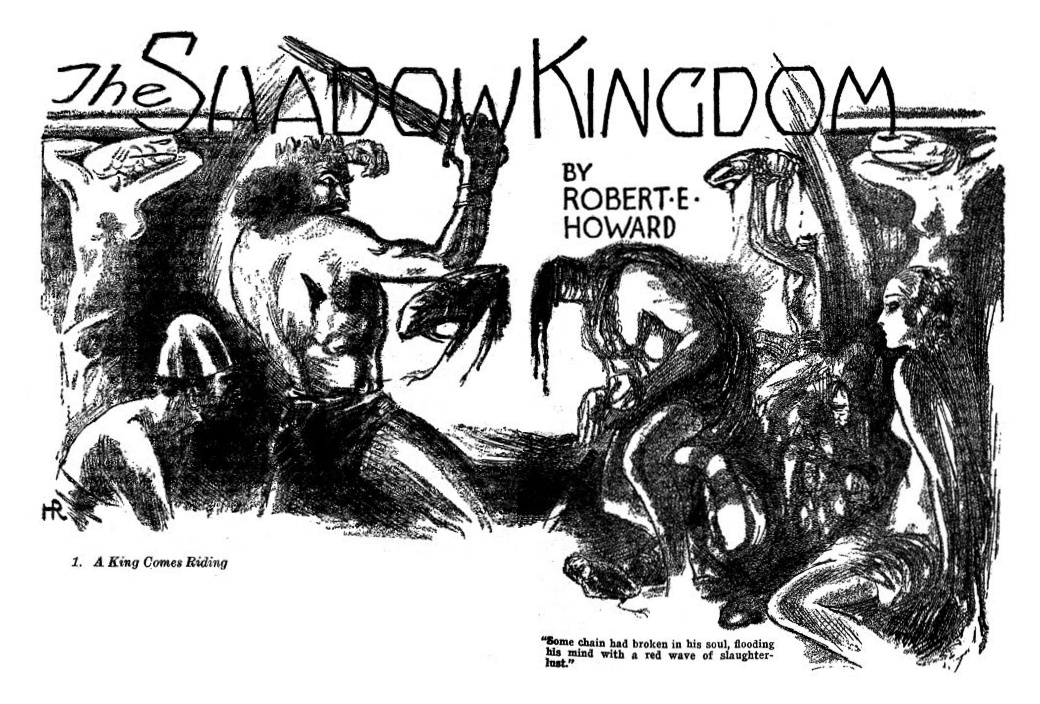
- Illustration for Robert E. Howard's "The Shadow Kingdom" in Weird Tales (August 1929), Kull's first appearance
- First appearance: "The Shadow Kingdom" in Weird Tales (August, 1929)
- Created by: Robert E. Howard
- Portrayed by: Kevin Sorbo

In-universe information
- Species: Human
- Gender: Male
- Occupation: Current: King; Former: Soldier; Gladiator; Outlaw; Pirate; Slave
- Affiliation: Allies: Brule; Tu; Ka-Nu; Enemies: Thulsa Doom
- Weapon: Sword; Axe
- Origin: Atlantis
- Nationality: Atlantean

Kull of Atlantis or Kull the Conqueror is a fictional character created by American writer Robert E. Howard. The character was more introspective than Howard's subsequent creation, Conan the Barbarian, whose first appearance was in a rewritten version of a rejected Kull story.

His first published appearance was "The Shadow Kingdom" in Weird Tales (August, 1929). Kull was portrayed in the 1997 film Kull the Conqueror by actor Kevin Sorbo. The character has also been featured in comics series published by Marvel Comics, Dark Horse Comics, and Titan Comics.

== Personality and character ==
Kull is similar to Conan in many ways. He is a fierce warrior, ruthless and courageous on the battlefield, but not tyrannical or cruel. He has a strong sense of chivalry and virtue. Unlike Conan, Kull is philosophical and brooding. He agonizes over decisions that affect the lives of those around him, always looking for the most noble action to take. He is uncomfortable with kingship and prefers the life of a general. Also unlike Conan, Kull is asexual and aromantic; while capable of recognizing beautiful women as attractive, he has "never been a lover," at least in the original Howard stories. Despite this, Kull is always shown to be in favor of allowing lovers to marry regardless of social status or traditional convention.

== Fictional character biography ==
=== Life in Atlantis ===
Kull was born in pre-cataclysmic Atlantis c. 100,000 BC, depicted as inhabited at the time by barbarian tribes. East of Atlantis lay the ancient continent of Thuria, of which the northwest portion was divided among several civilized kingdoms. The most powerful among these was Valusia; others included Commoria, Grondar, Kamelia, Thule, and Verulia. Note that the word "Thuria" never appears in any of the Kull stories. Howard coined the term while tying Kull's world to Conan's in the 1936 essay "The Hyborian Age".

Kull was born into a tribe settled in the Tiger Valley of Atlantis. Both the valley and tribe were destroyed by a flood while Kull was still a toddler, leaving the young Kull to live as a feral child for many years. Kull was captured by the Sea-Mountain tribe and eventually adopted by them. In "Exile of Atlantis", an adolescent Kull grants a woman a quick death so that she will not be burned to death by a mob. For this selfless act, Kull is exiled from Atlantis.

=== Slave, pirate, outlaw, and gladiator ===
Kull attempted to reach Thuria, but was instead captured by Lemurian Pirates. He spent a couple of years as a galley slave before regaining his freedom during a mutiny.

He tried the life of a pirate between his late adolescence and his early twenties. His fighting skills and courage allowed him to become captain of his own ship. Soon, Kull gained a fearsome reputation for himself in the seas surrounding Atlantis and Thuria. Kull lost his ship and crew in a naval battle off the coast of Valusia, but once again survived.

He settled in Valusia as an outlaw. However, his criminal career proved to be short-lived as he was soon captured by the Valusians and imprisoned in a dungeon. His captors offered him a choice: execution or service as a gladiator. He chose the latter. After proving to be an effective combatant and gaining fame in the arenas of the capital, a number of admirers helped him to regain his freedom.

=== Soldier of Valusia ===
Kull never left Valusia or returned to the life of an outlaw. Instead, he joined the Royal army as a mercenary, pursuing elevation through the ranks. In "The Curse of the Golden Skull" Kull, approaching his thirties, is recruited by King Borna of Valusia in a mission against the ambitious sorcerer Rotath of Lemuria. Kull proves to be an effective assassin.

Borna promoted Kull into the general command of his mercenary forces. Borna himself, however, had gained a reputation for his cruelty and despotism. There was discontent with Borna's rule among the nobility, leading eventually to a civil war. The mercenaries proved more loyal to Kull than any other leader, allowing him to become the leader of their revolt.

=== King of Valusia ===
Kull killed Borna and took the throne while he was still in his early thirties. In "The Shadow Kingdom", Kull has spent six months upon the Valusian throne and faces the first conspiracy against him.

The series continued with Kull finding that gaining the crown was easier than securing it. He faces several internal and external challenges throughout the series. The conspiring of his courtiers leaves Kull almost constantly threatened with loss of life and throne. The aging King is ever more aware of the Sword of Damocles that he inherited along with the crown.

"The Mirrors of Tuzun Thune" finds Kull becoming progressively more introspective. The former barbarian is left lost in contemplations of philosophy.

In the Conan story "Shadows of the Skull" by L. Sprague de Camp and Lin Carter, it is revealed that Conan is a direct descendant of Kull. However, this story was written many years after the death of the original author of Kull and Conan, Robert E. Howard.

== Characters ==
=== Brule ===
Brule the spear slayer, a pre-cataclysmic Pict, and friend to Kull. Despite the animosity between Picts and Atlanteans, Brule is a fast friend and advisor to Kull.

=== Tu ===
First Councillor Tu is a trusted administrator, but also a constant reminder of the tradition bound laws and customs of Valusia.

=== Ka-Nu ===
Ka-Nu (sometimes named Kananu), the Pictish Ambassador to Valusia and wise man, is responsible for the friendship between Kull and Brule despite the ancient enmity between Atlanteans and Picts.

=== Borna ===
The last king of Valusia, a cruel and tyrannical despot who was overthrown by Kull and his soldiers.

=== Thulsa Doom ===
Kull's mortal enemy is the sorcerer Thulsa Doom. Thulsa Doom is described by Howard in "The Cat and the Skull" as having a face "like a bare white skull, in whose eye sockets flamed livid fire". He is seemingly invulnerable, boasting after being trampled by one of Kull's comrades that he feels "only a slight coldness" when being injured and will only "pass to some other sphere when [his] time comes".

== Works ==
Title	Date	Publication	Form	Notes
"The Shadow Kingdom"	1929, August	Weird Tales	Story	Published in Howard's lifetime.
"The Mirrors of Tuzun Thune"	1929, September	Weird Tales	Story	Published in Howard's lifetime.
"Kings of the Night"	1930, November	Weird Tales	Story	Published in Howard's lifetime.
"The King and the Oak"	1939, February	Weird Tales	Poem	
"The Altar and the Scorpion"	1967	King Kull	Story	
"By This Axe I Rule!"	1967	King Kull	Story	Re-written by Howard into the Conan story "The Phoenix on the Sword".
"Delcardes' Cat"	1967	King Kull	Story	Also known as "The Cat and the Skull".
"Exile of Atlantis"	1967	King Kull	Story	Originally an untitled story, title created by Lin Carter.
"The Skull of Silence"	1967	King Kull	Story	Also known as "The Screaming Skull of Silence".
"The Striking of the Gong"	1967	Second Book of Robert E. Howard	Story	A version edited by Lin Carter was first published in King Kull in 1967.
"Swords of the Purple Kingdom"	1967	King Kull	Story	
"The Curse of the Golden Skull"	1967, Spring	The Howard Collector, no. 9	Story	
"The Black City"	1978	Kull	Story	A version edited by Lin Carter was titled "The Black Abyss" and published in King Kull in 1967.
"Riders Beyond the Sunrise"	1978	Kull	Story	Originally an untitled draft, title created by Lin Carter. A version edited by Carter was first published in King Kull in 1967.
"Wizard and Warrior"	1978	Kull	Story	Originally an untitled fragment, title created by Lin Carter. A version edited by Carter was first published in King Kull in 1967.

== Style ==
Kull is Conan the Barbarian's direct literary forerunner. Conan's first story (both as a written piece and a published one), "The Phoenix on the Sword", is a rewriting of an earlier Kull story "By This Axe, I Rule". The Conan version has a completely new backstory, less philosophy, more action, and various supernatural elements. Many passages of both stories still match word for word.

One notable difference between Kull and Conan is their respective attitudes towards women. While Conan is a notable womanizer, finding a new love interest in nearly each of his stories, Kull is repeatedly mentioned as uninterested in having any such attachment. While highly chivalrous and on several occasions helping pairs of star-crossed lovers reach a happy consummation, he is never mentioned as having himself any relationship with a woman. Nor does Kull show any interest in marrying and founding a dynasty, as Conan does in The Hour of the Dragon, and none of Kull's wise advisors ever mentions this issue.

== Inspiration ==
Patrice Louinet writes in "Atlantis Genesis" that Howard may have been influenced by the work of Paul L. Anderson and his novellas published in Argosy in the 1920s. Louinet notes Howard's stories echo Anderson's subject (how the Cro-Magnons supplanted the Neanderthals). Also, Louinet found Howard had borrowed some names from Anderson (En-Ro of the Ta-an and Land of the Dying Sun resemble Am-ra of the Ta-an and Land of the Morning Sun). The Cro-Magnon/Atlantis connection seems to have originated with Lewis Spence, a British folklorist, in his The Problem of Atlantis (1924) and Atlantis in America (1925), works that could have influenced Howard.

There is a possibility that Kull's name comes from Old King Cole, who was mentioned in "The Search" by Edgar Lee Masters, published in Cosmopolitan, a poem Howard had "been trying to re-discover". It contains lines "The Tiger banner and Dragon banner/Flutter around the world", which compare to "The Hour of the Dragon", where the lion is Conan's emblem and the dragon that of his enemy, Nemedia, whereas the tiger is Kull's totem.

== Adaptations ==
=== Comics ===
Kull has been adapted to comics by Marvel Comics with three series between 1971 and 1985. The first was drawn by Marie Severin and her brother John Severin. He also appeared several times in The Savage Sword of Conan series and other anthology books. Another graphic novel, Kull: The Vale of Shadow, was published in 1989.

In 2006, Dark Horse Comics acquired the rights to use Kull. The first series, titled Kull, was based on "The Shadow Kingdom". As of 2012, three mini-series were published, Kull, Kull: The Hate Witch, and Kull: The Cat and the Skull. Dark Horse also re-published the Marvel stories into two different Kull collections. The Marvel color comics were collected into five volumes titled The Chronicles of Kull, and the Marvel magazine format, black and white stories were collected into two volumes titled The Savage Sword of Kull. Additional reprints were published in Robert E. Howard's Savage Sword.

In 2017, IDW Publishing acquired the license and began publishing Kull Eternal, using "The Mirrors of Tuzun Thune" as a story foundation of Kull in a modern setting. The series was cancelled after the third issue.

In 2024, Arrow Comics published an adaptation of "The Shadow Kingdom" written by Randy Zimmerman with art by Russ Leach.

Titan Comics announced Kull would be featured prominently in the 2025 limited series Scourge of the Serpent and would receive a series in 2027.

==== Collected editions ====
Title	Material collected from	Publication date	ISBN
The Chronicles of Kull Volume 1: A King Comes Riding and Other Stories	Creatures on the Loose! #10 The Coming of King Kull! (The Skull of Silence!), Monsters on the Prowl #16 King Kull! (The Forbidden Swamp), Conan The Barbarian #10 Kull the Conqueror (The King and the Oak); Kull the Conqueror (Vol. 1) #1–9	December 2, 2009	978-1-59582-413-4
The Chronicles of Kull Volume 2: The Hell Beneath Atlantis and Other Stories	Kull the Conqueror (Vol. 1) #10; Kull the Destroyer #11–20	April 7, 2010	978-1-59582-439-4
The Chronicles of Kull Volume 3: Screams in the Dark and Other Stories	Kull the Destroyer #21–29 "The Mirrors of Tuzun Thune" from Conan the Barbarian #25; Conan the Barbarian #68 "The Beast from the Abyss" from Conan Annual #3	May 22, 2010	978-1-59582-585-8
The Chronicles of Kull Volume 4: The Blood of Kings and Other Stories	Kull the Conqueror (Vol. 2) #1 and #2; Kull the Conqueror (Vol. 3) #1 and #2	March 2, 2011	978-1-59582-684-8
The Chronicles of Kull Volume 5: Dead Men of the Deep and Other Stories	Kull the Conqueror (Vol. 3) #3–10	February 22, 2012	978-1-59582-906-1
The Savage Sword of Kull Volume 1	Savage Tales #2, The Savage Sword of Conan #2, #3, #9, #23, #34, #42, #43, #55, and #119, Kull and the Barbarians #1–3, The Savage Sword of Conan Annual #1, Marvel Preview #19, Bizarre Adventures #26	November 17, 2009	978-1-59582-593-3
The Savage Sword of Kull Volume 2	The Savage Sword of Conan #128–140, #145, #147–152, #158, #159, #161, #165, #169, #170, #172, #177, #182, #183, #186, #190–193, #196–199, #202, #213, #215, #229, and #230–233, Conan Saga #97	October 5, 2011	978-1-59582-788-3
Kull Volume 1: The Shadow Kingdom	Kull #1–6	October 14, 2009	978-1-59582-385-4
Kull Volume 2: The Hate Witch	Kull: The Hate Witch #1–4	July 13, 2011	978-1-59582-730-2
Kull Volume 3: The Cat and the Skull	Kull: The Cat and the Skull #1–4	July 25, 2012	978-1-59582-899-6

=== Film ===
The 1982 film Conan the Barbarian, starring Arnold Schwarzenegger, borrowed many elements from Howard's Kull stories. The main villain Thulsa Doom was from the Kull series, as was the serpent cult. Conan's early life as a slave and gladiator in the movie borrows heavily from Kull's origin story and only shares minor details with Conan's literary origins; Conan was never a slave or a gladiator in Howard's stories, and left Cimmeria of his own free will.

The 1997 film Kull the Conqueror stars Kevin Sorbo in the title role. The film was originally intended to be a Conan film and some elements of this remain. The story's basis and several names can be directly traced to the Conan story "The Hour of the Dragon".

=== Namesakes in other works of fiction ===
Kull may have been the source of the name of King Kull, a Fawcett Comics supervillain and foe of Captain Marvel, later acquired by DC Comics. This King Kull combines barbarian elements with the bizarre science fiction elements common in Captain Marvel stories of the Golden Age of comic books.

== Chronology ==
In Robert E. Howard's story "Kings of the Night", a character living in the time of the Roman Empire states that a contemporary of Kull's "has been dead a hundred thousand years as we reckon time."

== Copyright and trademark ==
The name Kull was registered as a trademark by Kull Productions in 1985. The trademark is now owned by Robert E. Howard Properties.

Written works published before 1930, including "The Shadow Kingdom" and "The Mirrors of Tuzun Thune", have entered the public domain in the United States in 2025. In the European Union, where the copyright term is the author's life plus 70 years, these stories entered the public domain in 2007.
