= Sabre (comics) =

American graphic novel and comic series

- The cover to the original release of Sabre, art by Paul Gulacy.
- Date: August 1978
- Main characters: Sabre; Melissa Siren; Blackstar Blood
- Publisher: Eclipse Enterprises

Creative team
- Writer: Don McGregor
- Artist: Paul Gulacy; Billy Graham (issues #3–9)
- Letterers: Annette Kawecki
- Creators: Don McGregor; Paul Gulacy
- Editors: Dean Mullaney

Sabre is the title of a creator-owned American graphic novel, first published in August 1978. Created by writer Don McGregor and artist Paul Gulacy, it was published by Eclipse Enterprises, later known as Eclipse Comics. It was one of the first American graphic novels, and the first to be distributed solely in comic book shops via the direct market. The story is a science fiction swashbuckler in which the self-consciously romantic rebel Sabre and his companion Melissa Siren fight the mercenary Blackstar Blood and others to achieve freedom and strike a blow for individuality.

Following the success of the graphic novel, an ongoing series continuing the story was published by Eclipse between 1982 and 1985.

== Creation ==
Writer Don McGregor had received considerable acclaim with two Marvel Comics strips in the 1970s, "Killraven, Warrior of the Worlds" (in Amazing Adventures) and "The Black Panther" in Jungle Action. However, neither book was a strong seller and both would end up cancelled, leaving McGregor both without work and - due to the series both being work-for-hire - no means of completing his planned stories. He was also frustrated by Marvel's uneasiness with long plot arcs, and that he was only paid page rate for his work for the company, with no royalties. Thus McGregor began exploring work he would retain the rights to, and pitched a story called Dagger to Mad Genius, a small studio ran by Marvel alumni Jim Salicrup, Steve Gerber and Dave Kraft, as part of a planned anthology of creator-owned stories. The basic concept of the character came to McGregor when watching Errol Flynn movie Captain Blood on television.

After changing the name to Sabre - which fit the swashbuckling theme he was aiming for - he linked up with artist Paul Gulacy, who had found success on Marvel's The Deadly Hands of Kung Fu and was looking to do something new. He began design work on the character, drawing on Jimi Hendrix and Clint Eastwood's The Man With No Name character for inspiration, also using issues of Soldier of Fortune for reference. McGregor meanwhile was keen to explore story ideas that were frowned upon by Marvel editorial policy at the time, including an interracial relationship between the black Sabre and the white Melissa Siren, and homosexual characters.

Gulacy's art caught the eye of McGregor's friend Dean Mullaney at a gathering at McGregor's apartment. Mullaney had recently started Eclipse Enterprises in April 1978 with his brother Jan to publish creator-owned comics, and the pair soon began planning how to release Sabre. They settled on a graphic novel format, inspired by Ed Aprill's newspaper strip reprint compilations. While this allowed high quality paper stock compared to the newsprint used by monthly comics, financial reasons limited it to black-and-white interiors and only 38 pages of story; McGregor would later note the irony of the low page count considering his ambitions for lengthier works. Nevertheless as a sign of faith in the project and hoping to earn from future royalties, he was paid only a nominal fee of $300 for writing the story.

Gulacy and other contributors to the graphic novel were paid above page rate, and would also receive royalty payments for any further printings. The book was delayed when several pages of Gulacy's art were lost, the mailman having simply left the package containing them on the doorstep of McGregor's Queens apartment while the writer was out. As such, Gulacy simply had to redraw them. Annette Kawecki was the letterer. P. Craig Russell inked "several" pages, Gulacy said in 1980. A further delay came when both Gulacy and Mullaney objected to the closing section of the book featuring Melissa giving birth; however, McGregor stuck to his guns and the ending stayed. The book bore a dedication to McGregor's daughter, Lauren.

== Publication history ==
=== Graphic novel ===
Mullaney initially found the book difficult to sell; McGregor recalled that major direct market distributor Phil Seuling balked at the price of "$6 for a comic book" - at the time a typical monthly comic book was 35¢, and Marvel's 68-page Giant-Size issues cost 50¢. To help drive orders a seven-page preview was published in the June 1978 issue of Heavy Metal and titled "Prologue One", which was a success. The book - subtitled "Slow Fade of an Endangered Species" - was published in August 1978, and such strong orders that the first printing was sold out in three months; a second printing followed in 1979.

==== Historical placement ====
The original printing of Sabre described it as a "comic novel" and McGregor has since referred to it as a "graphic novella" due to its length. Will Eisner's A Contract with God, widely credited with popularising the term, was published a month later. Sabre is generally accepted to be the first graphic novel to be released solely to the direct market, however.

== Plot ==
By February 2020, Earth has succumbed to global famine, energy crises, a plague based on a leaked American-government bioweapon, and, in the U.S., a nine-year drought and a variety of terrorist acts including the contamination of Manhattan's water supply. The U.S. government retreated to a fortress and commenced battling rebels through proxies known as Overseers. One rebel, Sabre, arrives at an abandoned theme park intending to free a group of captured comrades. With him is his lover and fellow rebel, Melissa Siren. As the local Overseer and technician Misty Visions follow their whereabouts, using security cameras that cover most but not every part of the park, Sabre and Melissa infiltrate the park's fantasyland castle and encounter animatronic mermaids and musicians while discussing the nature of men, women and the world that has been left to them. Hunting them are the mercenary Blackstar Blood, who sees Sabre as an honorable adversary, and the Overseer's troops – including the nervous, prattling Willoughby, and Grouse, an "ani-human construction" resembling a hybrid human and jungle cat.

Sabre, fully aware the hostages serve as bait to trap him, nonetheless commandeers a replica of an old sailing ship as he searches for the captives. Blackstar and his crew ram it with one of their own, and capture the duo. Sabre is taken to a Synchronization Center, where, displayed before a gathering of scientists and officials, his memories are methodically wiped clean as he is forced to view Melissa, in a brothel suite, being groped and violated by Clarence, a sentient skeleton, and Grouse. She feigns submissiveness and steals Grouse's metal whip, swinging its bunched coils to tear apart Grouse's robotic head and whipping Clarence until he falls apart. Willoughby, who'd been repulsed by his comrades actions, unlocks her shackles.

In the Synchronization Center, the Overseer frees a docile-seeming Sabre, who instantly fights back, having resisted the removal of his last few memories and pieces of identity. Escaping with a gun, he reaches the brothel suite but finds Melissa gone – and is told by the Overseer that she is dead. They prepare to duel, while elsewhere, Melissa and Willoughby bond as they talk about what brought him here. He tells her the Overseer is keeping the captive rebels in the castle's dungeon. As Blackstar and his men hunt Melissa, the dueling Sabre and Overseer fall from a building onto the monorail tracks just below. Technician Visions prepares to shoot Sabre, but Blackstar kills her out of disgust for the way Sabre and Melissa were tortured and wanting to best Sabre personally. As Sabre and the Overseer battle, and as Blackstar charges his horse toward them while a monorail bears down on all, Melissa and the freed rebels attack. Melissa takes a horse from one of Blackstar's men and rides onto the monorail track, chasing Blackstar. Sabre overpowers the Overseer, but when he sees Blackstar, Melissa and the monorail bearing down, he loses his grip. Blackstar fires his weapon at the monorail, destroying it in a cataclysm that throws the combatants and horses from the track. Sabre shoots the Overseer dead. Blackstar, saying he is now unemployed, suggests that Sabre leave before more forces arrive to capture him.

Two months later, a pregnant Melissa, knowing militias are hunting Sabre, orders him to leave without her. He does, vowing to return for her and their child.

== Ongoing series ==
Sabre

Publication information
- Publisher: Eclipse Comics
- Schedule: Bi-Monthly
- Format: Ongoing series
- Genre: Post-apocalyptic
- Publication date: August 1982 - August 1985
- No. of issues: 14

Creative team
- Written by: Don McGregor
- Artist(s): Paul Gulacy (#1-2); Billy Graham (#3-9); José Ortiz (#10-14)
- Editor: Cat Yronwode

Eclipse funnelled the profits for the series back into publishing further graphic novels - including McGregor's Detectives Inc.. By 1982 they had expanded to publishing monthly comics, and linked up with McGregor to make an ongoing series featuring Sabre. Eclipse granted McGregor control over the series to the extent that he could effectively decide its length. Gulacy only retained control over how the character looked, rather than any ownership of the character itself; by this point he was working on other projects. The first two issues reprinted "Slow Fade of an Endangered Species", now in colour, before a sequel called "An Exploitation Of Everything Dear", drawn by Billy Graham ran between #3 and #9. The storyline introduced villain Joyful Slaughter, a prospective US president cursed with both herpes and an inability to pronounce 'Sabre'; McGregor would later state than Slaughter eclipsed Killmonger as his favorite villainous creation. Sabre #7 featured gay characters Deuces Wild and Summer Ice kissing, a development that Eclipse editor-in-chief Cat Yronwode recalled drew largely positive responses from readers.

From #10 José Ortiz took over as artist for a third and final Sabre story, "The Decadence Indoctrination", which ran until #14, after which McGregor chose to pursue other projects. McGregor would later express reservations about the quality of some of the paper stock and coloring used for the ongoing series.

== Reprint editions ==
In 1988 the company issued a 10th anniversary edition, which featured a new painted cover by Gulacy and a new introduction from Dean Mullaney - as well as an updated picture of Lauren McGregor. A 20th-anniversary edition was published by Image Comics in 1998, and a 30th-anniversary edition by Desperado Publishing in 2008.
