= Venomm =

Marvel Comics character, enemy of Black Panther

Horatio Walters Venomm

Publication information
- Publisher: Marvel Comics
- First appearance: Jungle Action (vol. 2) #6 (September 1973)
- Created by: Don McGregor (writer); Rich Buckler (artist)

In-story information
- Alter ego: Horatio Walters
- Species: Human
- Team affiliations: Department of Occult Affairs
- Partnerships: Killmonger; Taku
- Notable aliases: Horatio Venomm; Venomm
- Abilities: Immunity to most venoms; Snake charmer

Venomm (Horatio Walters) is a character appearing in American comic books published by Marvel Comics. Created by Don McGregor and Rich Buckler, the character first appeared in Jungle Action vol. 2 #6 (September 1973). Venomm is a supervillain using snakes as weapons in his schemes, and frequently collaborated with Erik Killmonger in his efforts to challenge Wakanda. Eventually, Venomm became a member of the Department of Occult Armaments, a group dealing with mystical and supernatural threats.

== Development ==
=== Concept and creation ===
From the beginning, writer Don McGregor intended for Venomm and Taku to be not only gay men but an interracial couple. However, due to censorship at the time, he could not show it explicitly. In Black Panther: Panther's Prey #2 (1991), McGregor's narrative hints at a deeper, more intimate relationship between Venomm and Taku, subtly indicating they are companions. This connection was further explored and confirmed in later Marvel stories, with Danny Lore and Lucas Werneck's storyline fully revealing their relationship. 2022's Marvel's Voices: Pride fully confirmed them as a married couple.

=== Publication history ===
Horatio Walters debuted in Jungle Action vol. 2 #6 (September 1973), created by Don McGregor and Rich Buckler. He appeared in the 2022 Marvel's Voices: Pride one-shot.

== Fictional character biography ==
Horatio Walters grew up a loner and was scarred after his classmate Bruce Morgan threw acid in his face. Having become a recluse, Horatio befriended some snakes which were shunned like he was. While studying them, Horatio developed an immunity to their venom. While taking some night classes, Horatio was saved by Erik Killmonger who recruited him in his plans to invade Wakanda.

Stowing away on a plane sent from Wakanda, Venomm made his way to the Wakandan Vibranium mines to attack Black Panther. However, the Black Panther beat Venomm into submission. Within the Wakandan prison, a man named Taku tried to establish a friendship with Venomm, but Venomm distracted Taku so that Malice could free him. Black Panther returned and drove off Malice, while W'Kabi choked Venomm into submission and was then re-imprisoned. Taku continued to try to reach Venomm, but when W'Kabi attempted to interrogate Venomm, Venomm attacked both of them and escaped. Venomm returned to his snakepit, and the Black Panther followed him there. Venomm sent a small army of constrictors and poisonous snakes against him, but Taku had followed the Black Panther, and when Venomm was unable to allow Taku to be harmed, he surrendered to the Black Panther. When Killmonger assaulted Central Wakanda, Venomm was able to escape the prison again. Having grown disenchanted with the insurrection, he stopped King Kadaver's psychic assault on Taku, and got Cadaver killed by one of his own dinosaurs. In the aftermath of the battle, based on the recommendation of Taku, Venomm was pardoned and released.

Venomm later lived in the Wakandan Palace alongside Taku. A CIA agent had secretly embedded a transmitter under the skin of Venomm's giant pet python Matilda, causing the Black Panther to initially think that Venomm was a spy in their midst, but when he learned the truth the Black Panther removed the transmitter from her head. Venomm maintained a position of trust within the Wakandan Palace, where be befriended Nick Collins, the son of Michael Collins. Under the command of their king, the Black Panther, all of Wakanda marched onto the land of the Jabari to punish the Man-Ape for murdering a doppelganger version of the Black Panther. Venomm was at the front lines in the midst of the army and tribal warriors, and battled Jabari tribesmen during the conflict.

He briefly reappeared as one of the villains summoned by Sin to battle Earth's heroes. He joined the DOA's battle against the Avengers and other heroes at the DOA's HQ in South Carolina, but was knocked unconscious by Iron Fist.

== Powers and abilities ==
Venomm uses poisonous snakes as both whips and lassos, wrapping them around his body and developing an immunity to their venom.

== Other versions ==
=== Black Panther ===
An alternate version of Horatio Walters appears in Black Panther. He allies himself with T'Charra, Killmonger, and several other villains in a plot to kill T'Challa. The group kidnaps Everett K. Ross as part of their plan. However, after T'Charra betrays Killmonger, Venomm helps move Ross to Coney Island, where they are confronted by Black Panther, Falcon, Power Man, and Brother Voodoo. They are ultimately defeated in this confrontation.
