= Gabriel (comics) =

Gabriel, in comics, may refer to:

- Gabriel the Devil Hunter, a Marvel Comics character
- Gabriel the Air-Walker, another Marvel character

== See also ==
- Gabriel (given name)
