= Amazing Adventures =

Multiple comic book series

Amazing Adventures is the name of several anthology comic book series, all but one published by Marvel Comics.

The earliest Marvel series of that name introduced the company's first superhero of the late-1950s to early-1960s period fans and historians call the Silver Age of Comic Books. That same series also included the first comic book to be labeled "Marvel Comics".

== Ziff-Davis ==
The first series titled Amazing Adventures was a 1950s science fiction anthology produced by Ziff-Davis and featuring painted covers. It ran for six issues, beginning c. 1950. with the first two issues being undated. Subsequent issues were dated June, August, and November 1951, and fall 1952. Its artists included Murphy Anderson, Bernard Krigstein, and Don Perlin, and at least one issue (#2) featured a cover painting by Alex Schomburg.

== Marvel Comics ==
Amazing Adventures
- Amazing Adventures #3 (Aug. 1961), cover art by Jack Kirby and Dick Ayers.

Publication information
- Publisher: Marvel Comics
- Format: Anthology
- Genre: Fantasy; Science fiction Superhero
- Publication date: (Vol. 1) June 1961 – November 1961 (Vol. 2) August 1970 – November 1976 (Vol. 3) December 1979 – January 1981
- No. of issues: (Vol. 1) 6 (Vol. 2) 39 (Vol. 3) 14

Creative team
- Written by: (Vol. 1) Stan Lee (Vol. 2) Gerry Conway, Steve Englehart, Gary Friedrich, Jack Kirby, Don McGregor, Roy Thomas
- Penciller(s): (Vol. 1) Steve Ditko, Jack Kirby (Vol. 2) Neal Adams, Rich Buckler, John Buscema, Howard Chaykin, Gene Colan, Jack Kirby, P. Craig Russell, Jim Starlin, Tom Sutton, Herb Trimpe
- Inker: Syd Shores

=== 1961 series ===
Marvel's first series of this title ran six issues, premiering with June 1961 cover-date. It featured primarily science fiction and drive-in movie-style monster stories, virtually all drawn by either Jack Kirby or Steve Ditko. Its first issue introduced the supernatural monster-hunter Doctor Droom, Marvel's first Silver Age of Comic Books superhero. Droom had powers of telepathy and hypnotic suggestion taught him by a Tibetan lama who had requested that someone travel from the U.S. to give him medical attention.

Doctor Droom vanished into obscurity for years when the comic was re-titled and reformatted as Amazing Adult Fantasy from issues #7–14 (Dec. 1961 – July 1962). He resurfaced in the 1970s as Doctor Druid, having been renamed to avoid confusion with Doctor Doom. The series was re-titled once more for its final issue, published as Amazing Fantasy #15 (Aug. 1962), the comic book that introduced Spider-Man.

=== 1970 series ===
Amazing Adventures (vol. 2) #39 (Nov. 1976), art by P. Craig Russell (face of Old Skull, man at left, re-drawn by John Romita Sr.)

Marvel's next Amazing Adventures was a split title featuring the Inhumans (initially both written and drawn by Jack Kirby, later drawn by Neal Adams) and Black Widow (initially by writer Gary Friedrich and penciler John Buscema). The Widow was dropped after (vol. 2) #8, and full-length Inhumans stories ran for two issues before that feature, too, was dropped.

Vol. 2 #11 (March 1972) introduced solo stories of X-Men member Beast, in which he was mutated into his modern blue-furred form. The initial story was by writer Gerry Conway, penciler Tom Sutton, and inker Syd Shores. Steve Englehart became the feature's writer with issue #12 and added Patsy Walker and her then-husband, "Buzz" Baxter, to the Beast's supporting cast in issue #13.

In the fall of 1972, writers Englehart, Conway and Len Wein crafted a metafictional unofficial crossover spanning titles from both major comics companies. Each comic featured Englehart, Conway, and Wein, as well as Wein's first wife Glynis, interacting with Marvel or DC characters at the Rutland Halloween Parade in Rutland, Vermont. Beginning in Amazing Adventures (vol. 2) #16 (by Englehart with art by Bob Brown and Frank McLaughlin), the story continued in Justice League of America #103 (by Wein, Dick Dillin and Dick Giordano), and concluded in Thor #207 (by Conway and penciler John Buscema). As Englehart explained in 2010: "It certainly seemed like a radical concept and we knew that we had to be subtle (laughs) and each story had to stand on its own, but we really worked it out. It's really worthwhile to read those stories back to back to back – it didn't matter to us that one was at DC and two were at Marvel – I think it was us being creative, thinking what would be really cool to do". The Beast's feature ended with (vol. 2) #16 (Jan. 1973).

Following an issue that reprinted the back-up features recounting the Beast's origin (edited from [Uncanny] X-Men #49–53 (with a new, single-page introduction by writer Englehart and penciler Jim Starlin), the title introduced the series "War of the Worlds" and its central character, Killraven, in (vol. 2) #18 (May 1973). Created by co-plotters Roy Thomas and Neal Adams, scripter Conway, and pencilers Adams and Howard Chaykin, it was taken over by writer Don McGregor for an acclaimed run from (vol. 2) #21 (Nov. 1973) to the final issue, (vol. 2) #39 (Nov. 1976). Pencillers were Herb Trimpe, Rich Buckler, Gene Colan, and, most notably, P. Craig Russell from (vol. 2) #27.

Its sister publication was Astonishing Tales. Additionally, plans were announced for a never-realized third split book featuring Doctor Strange and Iceman.

=== 1979 series ===
Volume 3 was a reprint series running 14 issues (Dec. 1979 – Jan. 1981). It reprinted X-Men #1–8 (Sept. 1963 – March 1964), the first six issues of which were split into two-part stories with an accompanying back-up feature. For all but issue #12, this was the "Origin of the X-Men" back-up feature from X-Men #38–48. The exception was the incongruous, 11-page Jim Steranko "Nick Fury, Agent of S.H.I.E.L.D." story, "Today Earth Died", from Strange Tales #168 (May 1968).

Eight covers of this 1979 series were reprints of the Jack Kirby originals; artists for the rest included penciler John Byrne on (vol. 3) #6 and 9.

=== Other ===
The similarly named Amazing High Adventure was a sporadically published anthology of historical, biblical and science-fiction adventure stories from August 1984 to December 1986. Like the 1950s Ziff-Davis Amazing Adventures, it, too, featured painted covers, with the artists including Joe Chiodo, Frank Cirocco, Dan Green, and John Bolton. A one-shot, cover-billed as Amazing Adventures (July 1988) but listed as Amazing Adventure in the copyright indicia, was similarly an anthology with a painted cover.

== Collected editions ==
- Black Widow: The Sting of the Widow and Daredevil Omnibus Vol 3 includes the Black Widow stories from Amazing Adventures (vol. 2) #1–8, 152 pages, September 2009, ISBN 978-0785137948
- Marvel Masterworks: Inhumans Volume 1 includes the Inhumans stories from Amazing Adventures (vol. 2) #1–10, 240 pages, October 2009, ISBN 978-0785141419
- Marvel Masterworks: The X-Men Volume 7 includes Amazing Adventures (vol. 2) #11–17, 256 pages, October 2008, ISBN 978-0785130482
- Essential Classic X-Men Volume 3 includes Amazing Adventures (vol. 2) #11–17, 560 pages, February 2009, ISBN 978-0-7851-3060-4
- Essential Killraven includes Amazing Adventures (vol. 2) #18–39, 504 pages, July 2005, ISBN 978-0785117773
