= Don McGregor =

American comic book writer (born 1945)

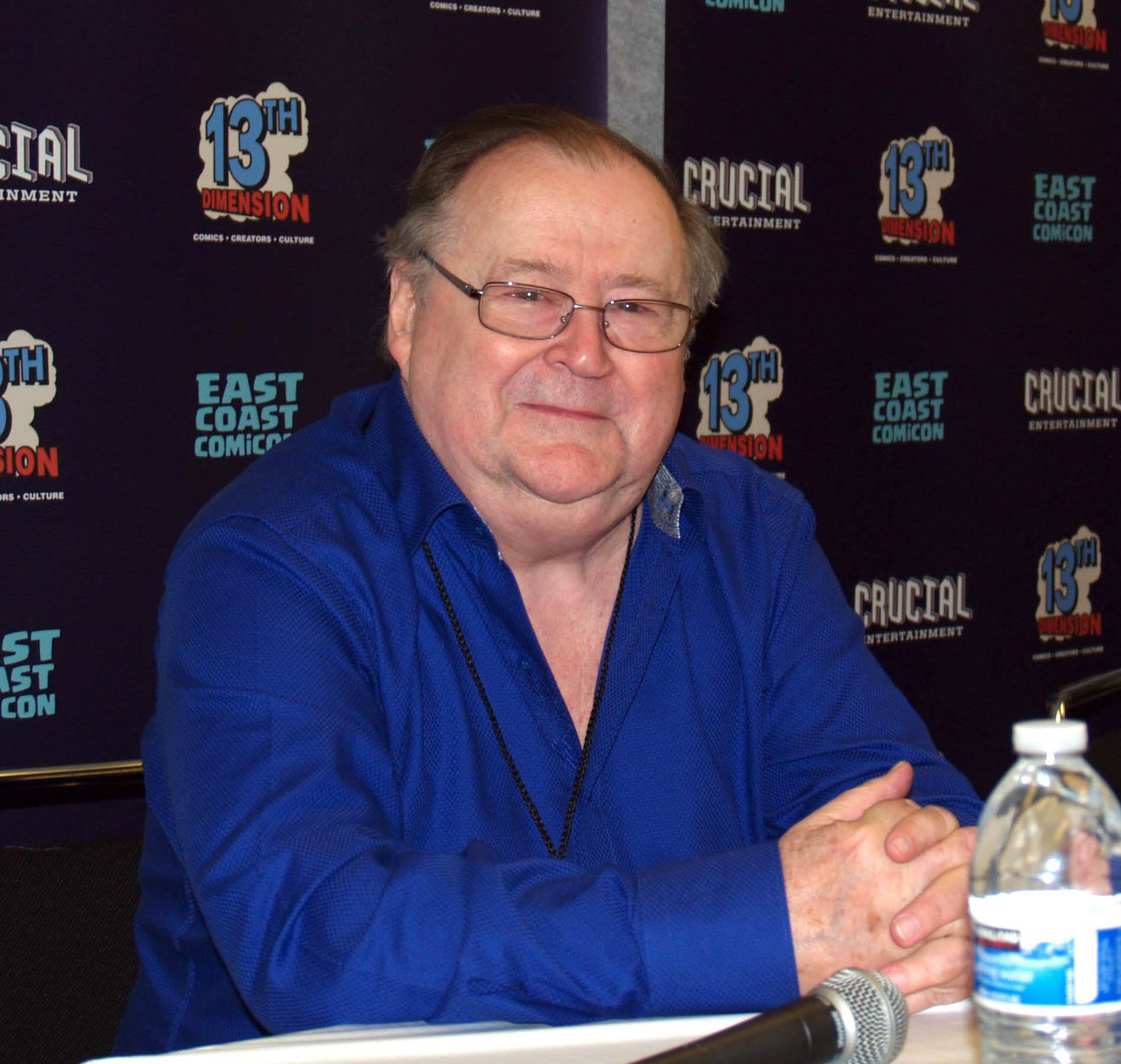
- McGregor in 2015
- Born: Donald Francis McGregor; June 15, 1945 (age 81) Providence, Rhode Island, U.S.
- Area: Writer
- Notable works: Sabre, Killraven, Black Panther

Donald Francis McGregor (born June 15, 1945) is an American comic book writer best known for his work for Marvel Comics; he is the author of one of the first graphic novels.

== Early life ==
Don McGregor was born in Providence, Rhode Island, where he worked myriad jobs as a young adult, including as a security guard, at a bank, at a movie theater, and "for my grandfather's company, [which] printed, among other things, the patches the astronauts wore on their flights to the moon." He additionally served as a supply sergeant in a military police unit of the Rhode Island Army National Guard. His first work in print was in the letters-to-the-editor columns of various Marvel Comics titles and for The Providence Journal, where his work included reviews of books by authors including Evan Hunter, "who influenced me greatly as a writer."

== Career ==
McGregor entered the comics industry with stories in Warren Publishing's black-and-white horror-comics anthology magazines. His first purchased script, "When Wakes The Dreamer", did not see print until Eerie #45 (Feb. 1973), long after his first published script, the 12-page cover story "The Fade-Away Walk" in Creepy #40 (July 1971), credited as Donald F. McGregor, with art by Tom Sutton. Through 1975, he wrote more than a dozen stories for those magazines and its sister title Vampirella, drawn by artists including Richard Corben and Reed Crandall. Of "When Wakes the Dreamer", he explained decades later, "[W]hat held it up was that [artist and Warren art director] Billy Graham was going to draw it and he'd done a spectacular opening page for it, but for one reason or another, it just didn't happen. ... I don't think we ever found the finished art for Billy's version of another early story of mine, 'The Vampiress Stalks the Castle This Night.'" That story eventually appeared in Vampirella #21 (Dec. 1972), with art by Felix Mas. After a stint with Marvel, McGregor returned to write another 18 stories for those Warren titles as well as The Rook between 1979 and 1983, with artists including Paul Gulacy, Alfredo Alcala, and Val Mayerik.

=== Marvel Comics ===
McGregor became a proofreader for Marvel Comics in late 1972, earning $125 a week, before establishing himself as a Marvel editor and writer. His first stories for the company were co-writing, with Gardner Fox, the six-page supernatural story "The Man with Two Faces" in Journey into Mystery vol. 2, #4 (April 1973; credited as "Donald F. McGregor"); and, solo, the six-page "A Tomb by Any Other Name", with art by Syd Shores, in Chamber of Chills #5 (July 1973).

He recalled in 2010,

I came to Marvel Comics because I loved Marvel Comics. As the line burgeoned, one of my jobs was to read all the reprint titles. One of the titles was Jungle Action, a collection of jungle genre comics from the 1950s, mostly detailing white men and women saving Africans or being threatened by them. I voiced a lament that I thought it was a shame that in 1973 Marvel was printing these stories, and couldn't we have a black African hero. ... Now, it was one of those unwritten rules that if you worked in editorial you would be given things to write, to supplement that $125 a week. It was at such a meeting that I learned I would be given [the recently launched feature] 'Killraven' (in Amazing Adventures) and Jungle Action, with the [existing African superhero the] Black Panther ... to write.

With those two features, which became among comics' most acclaimed, McGregor soon established himself as one of a 1970s wave of Marvel writers, including Steve Englehart, Steve Gerber and Doug Moench, who took often minor characters and helped create a writerly Renaissance. Former Marvel editor-in-chief Roy Thomas said in 2007,

[T]here was a lot of invention and experimentation going on during that period ... Steve [Gerber] and Don turned out be [writers] who advanced the field. ... I don't think Don's work sold terribly well, but I always thought he was doing some interesting things, and I thought, 'Well, the kind of stuff we put him on was the kind of stuff that we didn't expect to become great sellers anyway ... So let him experiment with it and see what happens'. And he certainly did a lot of interesting things with it.

McGregor wrote "Killraven, Warrior of the Worlds" in Amazing Adventures vol. 2, #21-39 (Nov. 1973 - Nov. 1976, except for fill-in issues #33 and 38); and "Black Panther" in Jungle Action #6-24 (Sept. 1973 - Nov. 1976, except for #23, a reprint). Comics historian Les Daniels noted that, "The scripts by Don McGregor emphasized the character's innate dignity." Unusually for mainstream comics, the Panther stories were set mostly in Africa, in the Panther's fictional homeland Wakanda rather than in Marvel's usual American settings. As with the futuristic stories of “Killraven”, McGregor's settings were enough outside the Marvel mainstream that he was able to explore mature themes and adult relationships in a way rare for comics at the time. In 2010, Comics Bulletin ranked McGregor's run on Jungle Action third on its list of the "Top 10 1970s Marvels".

Artist Rich Buckler, his first "Black Panther" collaborator, called McGregor and fellow Marvel writer Doug Moench "two of my absolutely favorite writers. They had the same drive and enthusiasm, and just huge amounts of talent and energy." African-American writer-editor Dwayne McDuffie said of the 1970s "Black Panther" series:

This overlooked and underrated classic is arguably the most tightly written multi-part superhero epic ever. ... It's damn-near flawless, every issue, every scene, a functional, necessary part of the whole. Okay, now go back and read any individual issue. You'll find seamlessly integrated words and pictures; clearly introduced characters and situations; a concise (sometimes even transparent) recap; beautifully developed character relationships; at least one cool new villain; a stunning action set piece to test our hero's skills and resolve; and a story that is always moving forward towards a definite and satisfying conclusion. That's what we should all be delivering, every single month. Don [McGregor] and company did it in only 17 story pages per issue".

He and artist P. Craig Russell engineered color comic books' first known dramatic interracial kiss in mainstream comics (as opposed to underground comix), between the "Killraven" characters M'Shulla and Carmilla Frost, in Amazing Adventures #31 (July 1975). Three years earlier, McGregor and artist Luis García Mozos had already presented the first known interracial kiss in any comics in Warren Publishing's black-and-white horror-comics magazine, Creepy #43 (Jan. 1972), in the story "The Men Who Called Him Monster".

More than two decades after the "Killraven" feature ended, comics historian Peter Sanderson wrote that,

It was writer Don McGregor who transformed the Killraven saga ... into a classic. Of all of Marvel's writers, McGregor has the most romantic view of heroism. Killraven and his warrior band were also a community of friends and lovers motivated by a poetic vision of freedom and of humanity's potential greatness. McGregor's finest artistic collaborator on the series was P. Craig Russell, whose sensitive, elaborate artwork, evocative of Art Nouveau illustration, gave the landscape of Killraven's America a nostalgic, pastoral feel, and the Martian architecture the look of futuristic castles.

McGregor's run on Jungle Action ended when the series was canceled due to low sales. He also wrote stories for the Marvel characters Luke Cage and Morbius the Living Vampire, and created the detective feature "Hodiah Twist", seen in the black-and-white magazines Vampire Tales #2 (Oct. 1973) and Marvel Preview #16: "Masters of Terror" (Fall 1978). McGregor adaptation of Edgar Allan Poe's "The Cask of Amontillado" as a backup story in Marvel Classics Comics #28 (1977) was artist Michael Golden's first published comics work. A Marvel "Bullpen Bulletins" page in 1975 announced McGregor's planned radio drama series, Night Figure, that was to have run on WHBI-FM.

Grant Morrison argues that McGregor's style of poetic narration was a strong influence on Alan Moore and Neil Gaiman. They say that McGregor had a passionate fan base and that his writing style was "overwrought, stretched to the limits of conventional grammar, with a pained, self-analytical edge."

=== Graphic novel pioneer ===
Sabre (1978). Cover art by Paul Gulacy. One of the first modern graphic novels, and the first sold through the then-emerging "direct market" of comic-book stores.

With artist Paul Gulacy, McGregor created one of the first modern graphic novels, Eclipse Enterprises' Sabre: Slow Fade of an Endangered Species, a near-future, dystopian science fiction swashbuckler that introduced the title character. McGregor's work premiered in August 1978, two months before Will Eisner's better-known pioneering graphic novel A Contract with God. Sabre was additionally the first graphic novel sold through the new "direct market" of comic-book stores. It later spun off a 14-issue Eclipse comic-book series.

Also for Eclipse, McGregor wrote Detectives Inc., a pair of graphic novels set in contemporary New York City and starring the interracial private eye team Ted Denning and Bob Rainier. Detectives Inc.: A Remembrance of Threatening Green (1980), with DC Comics artist Marshall Rogers, and Detectives, Inc.: A Terror Of Dying Dreams, with veteran Marvel artist Gene Colan, who would become a frequent collaborator, comprised the series. The first of these two books included the first lesbian characters in mass-market comics.

During this period, McGregor also wrote the two prose works Dragonflame and Other Bedtime Nightmares and The Variable Syndrome.

=== Later comics ===
Other work includes the DC Comics' miniseries Nathaniel Dusk (1984) and Nathaniel Dusk II (1985–1986), both with Colan; and, for New Media Publishing's Fantasy Illustrated (1982), "The Hounds of Hell Theory", starring the husband-and-wife detective team Alexander and Penelope Risk, with artist Tom Sutton.

McGregor revisited the Black Panther with Colan in "Panther's Quest", published as 25 eight-page installments within the biweekly omnibus series Marvel Comics Presents (issues #13–37, Feb.–Dec. 1989); and, later, with artist Dwayne Turner in the squarebound miniseries Panther's Prey (May–Oct. 1991). McGregor and Marshall Rogers crafted a two-part story in Spider-Man issues #27–28 dealing with bullying and gun violence. Other comic book work in the 1990s includes Blade #1–3 (Nov. 1998–Jan. 1999), starring the Marvel Comics vampire-slayer; the 14-page Morbius, the Living Vampire story "Desiring Martine", with artist Mike Dringenberg, in the Marvel one-shot Strange Tales: Dark Corners #1 (May 1998); and various issues of such Topps Comics licensed properties as Mars Attacks!, James Bond, the Lone Ranger, and The X-Files. McGregor wrote "Thin Edge of a Dime", a Batman Black and White backup story, in Batman: Gotham Knights #28 (June 2002) which was illustrated by Dick Giordano.

As well, McGregor is one of the primary writers of the Zorro canon, with a dozen issues of Topps' Zorro (#0–11, Nov. 1993–Nov. 1994) and the spinoff Lady Rawhide #1–5 (Oct. 1996–June 1997; reprinted by Image Comics as Zorro's Lady Rawhide: Other People's Blood #1–4, March–June 1999); two years of the Zorro newspaper comic strip (with artists Tod Smith and Thomas Yeates, premiering April 12, 1999, with the first year collected in a 2001 Image Comics book); Zorro #1–6 (May-Oct. 2005), with artist Sidney Lima, from the NBM Publishing imprint Papercutz; and 2010's Zorro: Matanzas, a sequel to the Topps series, with penciler Mike Mayhew, for Dynamite Entertainment. Returning to one of his signature characters, McGregor contributed a story to the Black Panther Annual #1, released in February 2018.

In 2024, McGregor would be a recipient of the Inkpot Award at the annual San Diego Comic Con.

In 2026, McGregor was a guest speaker at the Inkwell Awards live ceremony. There he introduced fellow artist and friend P. Craig Russell for the latter's Special Recognition Award.

== Bibliography ==
=== Dark Horse Comics ===
- James Bond 007: The Quasimodo Gambit #1–3 (1995)

=== DC Comics ===
- 9-11: The World's Finest Comic Book Writers & Artists Tell Stories to Remember, Volume Two (2002)
- Batman: Gotham Knights #28 (Batman Black and White) (2002)
- Nathaniel Dusk #1–4 (1984)
- Nathaniel Dusk II #1–4 (1985–1986)

=== Dynamite Entertainment ===
- Zorro Matanzas #1–4 (2010)

=== Eclipse Comics ===
- Detectives Inc.: A Remembrance of Threatening Green graphic novel (1980)
- Detectives, Inc.: A Terror of Dying Dreams graphic novel (1985)
- Eclipse Magazine #2–8 (1981–1983)
- Eclipse Monthly #3–4, 8 (1983–1984)
- Nightmares #1–2 (1985)
- Ragamuffins #1 (1985)
- Sabre #1–14 (1982–1985)
- Sabre graphic novel (1978)

=== HM Communications, Inc. ===
- Heavy Metal vol. 2 #2 (June 1978)

=== Image Comics ===
- Zorro: The Dailies, First Year (2001)

=== Marvel Comics ===
- Amazing Adventures vol. 2 #21–32, 34–37, 39 (Killraven) (1973–1976)
- Black Panther: Panther's Prey #1–4 (1991)
- Blade #1–3 (1998)
- Chamber of Chills #5 (1973)
- Deadly Hands of Kung Fu #2–4, 7–9, 11–12, 16–18, 24, 29 (text articles) (1974–1976)
- Defenders #48 (1977)
- Doctor Strange vol. 2 #31 (1978)
- Giant-Size Chillers #2 (1975)
- Journey into Mystery vol. 2 #4 (1973)
- Jungle Action #6–22, 24 (1973–1976)
- Marvel Classics Comics #23, 28, 31, 33 (1977–1978)
- Marvel Comics Presents #13–37 (Black Panther) (1989)
- Marvel Graphic Novel #7 (Killraven) (1983)
- Marvel Premiere #43 (Paladin) (1978)
- Marvel Preview #8, 16 (1976–1978)
- Monsters Unleashed #5, 11 (1974–1975)
- Power Man #28, 30-35 (1975–1976)
- Spider-Man #27–28 (1992)
- Strange Tales: Dark Corners #1 (1998)
- Tales of the Zombie #4, 10 (text articles) (1974–1975)
- Vampire Tales #2–5, 7–8, Annual #1 (Morbius, the Living Vampire) (1973–1975)
- What The--?! #9 (1990)

=== NBM Publishing ===
- Zorro #1–6 (2005)

=== New Media/Irjax ===
- Fantasy Illustrated #1 (1982)

=== Topps Comics ===
- Dracula Versus Zorro #1–2 (1993)
- James Bond, 007 / Goldeneye #1 (1996)
- Lady Rawhide #1–5 (1995–1996)
- Lady Rawhide vol. 2 #1–5 (1996–1997)
- Lady Rawhide Special Edition #1 (1995)
- The Lost World: Jurassic Park #1–4 (1997)
- Mars Attacks High School #1–2 (text articles) (1997)
- Topps Comics Presents #0 (1993)
- The X-Files #30–31 (1997)
- Zorro #0, #1–11 (1993–1994)

=== Vanguard Productions ===
- The Spider: Scavengers of the Slaughtered Sacrifices (2002)

=== Warren Publishing ===
- Creepy #41, 43, 54, 57–58, 72, 130, 141, 143, 145 (1971–1983)
- Eerie #37–38, 40, 45, 49, 103–105, 120–123, 138 (1972–1983)
- The Rook Magazine #12 (1981)
- Vampirella #15, 18, 21, 27, 37, 106, 108 (1972–1982)

== See also ==
- List of African-American firsts

Preceded by Steve Gerber	"Morbius" feature in Vampire Tales writer 1973–1974	Succeeded by n/a
Preceded by Marv Wolfman	"Killraven" feature in Amazing Adventures vol. 2 writer 1973–1976	Succeeded by n/a
Preceded by Bill Mantlo	Power Man writer 1975–1976	Succeeded by Marv Wolfman
