= True Believers (comics) =

Comic book series

- Cover of True Believers 1 (September 2008); Featuring Red Zone (left), Payback (center), Battalus (top right) and Head Trip (bottom right), art by Paul Gulacy

Publication information
- Publisher: Marvel Comics
- Schedule: Monthly
- Format: Limited series
- Genre: Superhero
- Publication date: September 2008 – January 2009
- No. of issues: 5
- Main character(s): Payback; Headtrip; Red Zone; Battalus

Creative team
- Created by: Cary Bates; Paul Gulacy
- Written by: Cary Bates
- Artist: Paul Gulacy
- Letterer: Dave Lanphear
- Colorist: Rain Beredo
- Editor(s): Thomas Brennan; Molly Lazer; Joe Quesada; Bill Rosemann; Lauren Sankovitch

Collected editions
- True Believers: ISBN 0-7851-2600-7

True Believers is an American comic book limited series from Marvel Comics, written by Cary Bates, with art by Paul Gulacy.

It is also the name of an obscure group of Spider-Man villains.

== Publication history ==
The series launched as a five-part storyline on July 30, 2008.

== Characters ==
The four team members are:

- Payback - Mavis Trent is a S.H.I.E.L.D. data analyst who uses her position to keep the True Believers safe from the Superhuman Registration Act. Due to being bonded with an alien symbiote, Trent is able to transform into a silver skinned energy form. Unlike the Venom symbiote, this one is sustained when its host is in a state of bliss.
- Headtrip - Talyn Roark is a relationship expert with heightened empathic abilities. She is Max Trent's former girlfriend and first recruit in the True Believers.
- Red Zone - Theo Bomba is a fringe conspiracy theorist who gained heightened mental abilities caused by a lightning strike accidentally fusing his skull with an advanced tin foil hat made from an alien alloy.
- Battalus - Ozzie Tanaka is a former S.H.I.E.L.D. R&D scientist who utilizes advanced battle armor developed for urban combat. Tanaka also has a form of borderline personality disorder.

== Plot ==
The series involves a team of new characters digging into the background goings-on in the Marvel Universe. The team is led by Payback, Mavis Trent, a S.H.I.E.L.D. data analyst.

Though a mini-series, True Believers is unusual in that each issue contains a central plot that is resolved by the end. The first issue features the team ending an underground fight club. This club is run by rich and powerful men who pay to have women abducted, drugged, and forced to fight one another.

The second issue deals with a conspiracy to frame Reed Richards, Mr. Fantastic of the Fantastic Four, for driving under the influence of alcohol. This issue also sees Payback with Reynolds' psychiatrist Dr. Cornelius Worth discussing her feelings with her father.

The third issue reveals the origin of Payback, and begins the search for the murderer of Payback's father.

The fourth gives the origins of Battalus and Red Zone, and further details of the murder of Payback's father.

The fifth reveals the truth behind the murder of Payback's father.

== Reception ==
The first issue had estimated sales of 17,151 copies, placing it at number 132 in the sales chart. Issue #2 dropped to an estimate of 12,838 (149th).

True Believers has received mixed reviews. For instance, Broken Frontier was less impressed, feeling it didn't live up to expectations suggesting "it is rather disappointing given what one might have hoped for" and that the "tone established by the writing crosses over to the art as well: it shows some nice potential, but fails to realize it fully". However, they also feel that all hope isn't lost and if "Bates and Gulacy really put their minds to it and are willing to push the limits of what they can do with this concept, it just might turn into something very special indeed. Keep an eye out for future issues" Comic Book Resources agrees and suggests that the story "is an original and timely concept, but the weak execution doesn't carry it well. Bates' craft seems to be a little rusty at best, and feels more than a little outdated at times" and that problems with the art partly come from script problems as "any artist would struggle to fit 15 panels on one page and still maintain a good flow." Comics Bulletin is largely positive and concludes that "overall this issue presents an interesting if somewhat vague introduction to the characters" with the only downside being the colouring "Beredo does an estimable job but the technique seems so common that it fails to add anything". They stop just shy of awarding full marks to the second issue, largely because the reviewer feels "a certain detachment from the principal character," but the minor niggles about the art in the first issue have been addressed and they declare that they are "prepared to ratchet up my praise for Rain Beredo's colours, too". The online comic book reviewer for Scifipulse.net, Nicholas Yanes, is equally positive, writing that "this is a title that everyone should have on their pull list."

== Collected editions ==
The series was collected into a trade paperback:

- Bates, Cary (2009). True Believers. Marvel Enterprises. ISBN 978-0-7851-2600-3.
