= Jungle Action =

American comic book series by Marvel

Jungle Action is the name of two American comic book series published by Marvel Comics and its 1950s precursor, Atlas Comics. The Marvel version contained the first series starring the Black Panther, the first black superhero in mainstream comics, created by the writer/artist team of Stan Lee and Jack Kirby in Fantastic Four #52 (July 1966).

== Atlas Comics ==
=== Publication history ===
Jungle Action
- Jungle Action #2 (Dec. 1954), cover art by Joe Maneely.

Publication information
- Publisher: Atlas Comics
- Schedule: Bimonthly
- Format: Ongoing series
- Genre: Superhero
- Publication date: October 1954 – August 1955
- No. of issues: 6
- Main character(s): Lo-Zar, Jungle Boy, Leopard Girl, Man-Oo, Serpo

Creative team
- Written by: Don Rico, others
- Artist(s): Joe Maneely, John Forte, Al Hartley, Paul Hodge

The first series – published during a time of few superheroes, when comics featured an enormous assortment of genres – was a multi-character omnibus that ran six issues (Oct. 1954 – Aug. 1955). Each starred the blond-haired, Tarzanesque Lo-Zar, Lord of the Jungle (renamed "Tharn the Magnificent" in 1970s reprints, presumably to avoid confusion with Marvel's modern-day Ka-Zar); Jungle Boy, the teenaged son of a renowned hunter; Leopard Girl, created by writer Don Rico and artist Al Hartley; and Man-Oo the Mighty, the jungle-protector gorilla hero of narrated nature dramas. The giant sentient snake Serpo was an antagonist common to most, lending some tangential geographic continuity.

Leopard Girl – a scientist's assistant named Gwen who was never given a last name – wore a skintight full-body leotard.

The four series' stories were called by one critic "painful to a modern eye, racist, ridiculous and old-fashioned", Those stories were drawn by Joe Maneely, John Forte, Al Hartley, and Paul Hodge, respectively.

=== Additional Atlas jungle titles ===
Two brethren titles were published by Atlas. The seven-issue Jungle Tales (Sept. 1954 – Sept. 1955) introduced Marvel's first African hero – Waku, Prince of the Bantu, who predated the Black Panther by nearly a dozen years. It was renamed and continued as Jann of the Jungle from #8–17 (Nov. 1955 – June 1957).

The second title, Lorna, the Jungle Queen, renamed Lorna, the Jungle Girl with issue #6, ran 26 issues (July 1953 – August 1957).

== Marvel Comics ==
=== Publication history ===
Jungle Action
- Jungle Action (vol. 2) #10 (July 1974), art by Gil Kane and Frank Giacoia.

Publication information
- Publisher: Marvel Comics
- Schedule: Bimonthly
- Format: Ongoing series
- Genre: Superhero
- Publication date: October 1972 – November 1976
- No. of issues: 24
- Main character: Black Panther

Creative team
- Written by: Don McGregor
- Artist(s): Rich Buckler, Gil Kane, Billy Graham
- Inker(s): Klaus Janson, P. Craig Russell

The company's second series of this name premiered with an issue cover-dated October 1972 and containing reprints of the same-name Atlas Comics title, with stories of white jungle adventurers. There was little market for these types of stories at the time, and the new Jungle Action was one of a wave of low-cost series that Marvel pushed out in the 1970s in a bid to capture shelf space from competing comics publishers.

Don McGregor, who was then proofreading all of Marvel's publications, noted to the editorial staff that the series' preponderance of white protagonists in African settings was culturally outdated to the point of being incongruous. Marvel responded by assigning McGregor to write original material for Jungle Action, with the only creative restriction being that the stories must be set in Africa. Thus an actual African protagonist, the superhero the Black Panther, took over the starring feature with issue #5, a reprint of the Panther-centric story in the superhero-team comic The Avengers #62 (March 1969). A new series began running the following issue, written by McGregor, with art by pencilers Rich Buckler, Gil Kane, and Billy Graham, and which gave inkers Klaus Janson and Bob McLeod some of their first professional exposure. Comics historian Les Daniels observed that "the scripts by Don McGregor emphasized the character's innate dignity". The critically well-received series ran in Jungle Action #6–24 (Sept. 1973– Nov. 1976).

One now-common innovation McGregor pioneered was that of the self-contained, multi-issue story arc. The first, "Panther's Rage", ran through the first 13 issues, initially as 13- to 15-page stories. Starting with Jungle Action #14, they were expanded to 18- to 19-page stories; there was additionally a 17-page epilogue. The length of the story arc coupled with the series' bimonthly schedule made it difficult for readers to keep characters and subplots fresh in their memories, but Jungle Action nonetheless maintained passable if modest sales and was popular with the desirable college-student demographic. Two decades later, writer Christopher Priest's 1998 series The Black Panther utilized Erik Killmonger, Venomm, and other characters introduced in this arc.

Critic Jason Sacks has called the arc "Marvel's first graphic novel", saying:

[T]here were real character arcs in Spider-Man and the Fantastic Four [comics] over time. But ... 'Panther's Rage' is the first comic that was created from start to finish as a complete novel. Running in two years' issues of Jungle Action (#s 6 through 18), 'Panther's Rage' is a 200-page novel that journeys to the heart of the African nation of Wakanda, a nation ravaged by a revolution against its king, T'Challa, the Black Panther.

The second and final arc, "Panther vs. the Klan", ran as mostly 17-page stories in Jungle Action #19–24 (Jan.–Nov. 1976), except for issue #23, a reprint of Daredevil #69 (Oct. 1970), in which the Black Panther guest-starred. The subject matter of the Ku Klux Klan was considered controversial in the Marvel offices at the time, creating difficulties for the creative team.

Writer Dwayne McDuffie said of the Jungle Action "Black Panther" series:

This overlooked and underrated classic is arguably the most tightly written multi-part superhero epic ever. ...It's damn-near flawless, every issue, every scene, a functional, necessary part of the whole. Okay, now go back and read any individual issue. You'll find seamlessly integrated words and pictures; clearly introduced characters and situations; a concise (sometimes even transparent) recap; beautifully developed character relationships; at least one cool new villain; a stunning action set piece to test our hero's skills and resolve; and a story that is always moving forward towards a definite and satisfying conclusion. That's what we should all be delivering, every single month. Don [McGregor] and company did it in only 17-story pages per issue.

Due to low sales and deadline problems, Jungle Action was cancelled with issue #24. "Panther vs. the Klan" was abandoned mid-story and Marvel relaunched the Black Panther in a self-titled series, with Jack Kirby – newly returned to Marvel after having decamped to rival DC Comics for a time – as writer, artist, and editor starting with cover-date January 1977. Marvel reasoned that though Jungle Action was not selling well, the starring character might still be successful if given a new approach. "Panther vs. the Klan" was later picked up as a subplot in Black Panther #14–15 (March–May 1979), the final two issues of that series before finally being concluded in Marvel Premiere #51–53 (Dec. 1979 – April 1980). However, these later chapters were written not by McGregor, but by Ed Hannigan. The original conclusion to "Panther vs. the Klan" was never completed, though work had started on what would have been Jungle Action #25, and in a 2008 interview McGregor said that he still has Rich Buckler's layouts for the issue.

In 2010, Comics Bulletin ranked McGregor's run on Jungle Action third on its list of the "Top 10 1970s Marvels".

== Collected editions ==
- Marvel Masterworks: Atlas Era Jungle Adventure:
  - Volume 1 collects Lorna, the Jungle Queen #1–5 and Lorna, the Jungle Girl #6–9, 248 pages, January 2010, ISBN 978-0785141914
  - Volume 2 collects Jungle Action #1–3, Jungle Tales #1–4 and Lorna, the Jungle Girl #10–12, 272 pages, June 2011, ISBN 978-0785150121
  - Volume 3 collects Jungle Action #4–6, Jungle Tales #5–7 and Lorna, the Jungle Girl #13–16, 280 pages, February 2013, ISBN 978-0785159278
- Marvel Masterworks: The Black Panther collects Jungle Action (vol. 2) #6–22 and 24, 352 pages, July 2010, ISBN 978-0785141983
- Essential Black Panther collects Jungle Action (vol. 2) #6–22 and 24 and Black Panther #1–10, 528 pages, May 2012, ISBN 978-0785163237
- The Official Marvel Graphic Novel Collection #116 collects the "Panther's Rage" storyline from Jungle Action (vol. 2) #6–18, May 2016, ISBN 978-1909766556
- Black Panther Epic Collection: Panther's Rage collects Fantastic Four #52–53 and Jungle Action (vol. 2) #6–22 and 24 with the cover of #23, 400 pages, October 2016, ISBN 978-1302901905
