= Killraven =

- Amazing Adventures vol. 2, #30 (May 1975); Left to right: M'Shulla, Killraven, Mint Julep; Cover art by P. Craig Russell.

Publication information
- Publisher: Marvel Comics
- First appearance: Amazing Adventures vol. 2, #18 (May 1973)
- Created by: Roy Thomas; Neal Adams; Gerry Conway

In-story information
- Alter ego: Jonathan Raven
- Team affiliations: Freemen
- Notable aliases: K.R.
- Abilities: Ability to project consciousness

Killraven (Jonathan Raven) is a character appearing in American comic books published by Marvel Comics. The character has been depicted as a freedom fighter in several post-apocalyptic alternate futures. Created by co-plotters Roy Thomas and Neal Adams, scriptwriter Gerry Conway, and penciller Adams, the character first appeared in Amazing Adventures vol. 2, #18 (May 1973). The series featured the first dramatic interracial kiss in American color comic books.

== Publishing history ==
Co-creator Neal Adams' early ideas for Killraven involved the character being the son of a Doc Savage archetype. This concept had been reworked by the first issue, a multiple-creator goulash in which the two originators and co-plotters turned the scripting over to another writer, and in which artist co-creator Adams penciled only the first 11 pages and Howard Chaykin the remaining nine. The second issue was fully written by the debut's scripter, Gerry Conway, followed in the third by Marv Wolfman.

After this, the book became the province of writer Don McGregor for an acclaimed run from #21 (Nov. 1973) to the final issue, #39 (Nov. 1976). Pencillers were Herb Trimpe, Rich Buckler, Gene Colan, and, most prominently, P. Craig Russell from issue #27 on.

Two of its characters, Carmilla Frost and the African American M'Shulla Scott, shared color comic books' earliest known non-satirical interracial kiss, in issue #31 (July 1975), page nine, final panel.

Aside from McGregor, with whom the character became associated, other writers include Bill Mantlo (a fill-in Amazing Adventures and a Marvel Team-Up with Killraven and a future-flung Spider-Man); Joe Linsner (a 2001 Marvel Knights one-shot, Killraven, set in 2020 New York City, at odds with the original series' locale by that fictional year); and Alan Davis (also artist), in a 2002 parallel universe miniseries, Killraven vol. 2. An Essential Marvel volume in 2005 reprinted all the character's appearances except that Davis series.

McGregor and Russell, however, remain the series' signature creative team; more than two decades after the original series' end, comics historian Peter Sanderson wrote that:

It was writer Don McGregor who transformed the Killraven saga ... into a classic. Of all of Marvel's writers, McGregor has the most romantic view of heroism. Killraven and his warrior band were also a community of friends and lovers motivated by a poetic vision of freedom and of humanity's potential greatness. McGregor's finest artistic collaborator on the series was P. Craig Russell, whose sensitive, elaborate artwork, evocative of Art Nouveau illustration, gave the landscape of Killraven's America a nostalgic, pastoral feel, and the Martian architecture the look of futuristic castles.

In 1983, McGregor and Russell reunited on a Killraven sequel entitled “Last Dreams Broken”, published as the seventh volume in Marvel's graphic novel series.

Some further planned elements of the "Killraven" saga were incorporated into the Eclipse Comics series Sabre, McGregor and Russell each said in 1983.

The character made latter-day appearances in Marvel Zombies 5 #2 (April 2010) where the war against the Martians is concluded, and in The Avengers vol. 4, #4-6 (Aug.-Oct. 2010), the latter in the present day after time-traveling. Killraven appears in Claws II (Aug. 2011), in which the superheroes Wolverine and Black Cat meet him in the future fighting Martians.

In 2014, Killraven also makes a cameo appearance in All-New Invaders Issue #12 in a modern retelling of the War of the Worlds.

=== Unrealized projects ===
In the late 1980s, Don McGregor wrote 50 to 60 pages and P. Craig Russell began illustrating a final story, "Killraven: Final Battles, Final Lies, Final Truths" (also referred to as "Final Lies, Final Truths, Final Battles"). The story never saw print, according to McGregor, because Marvel would not assure Russell the company would print the story in Marvel's best format at the time. In this intended finale to McGregor's story, "Killraven would take that war back to the intruders" on Mars itself.

In the mid-1990s, Grant Morrison and Mark Millar considered tying in Marvel's 2099 imprint, making Ravage a descendant of Killraven: "Our idea was that the Killraven stories had actually happened, but Earth somehow got itself back together. It's now one hundred years later, and the Martians are attacking again, meaning that all the superheroes were going to have to deal with them". Galactus then arrives and devours Mars along with the Martians.

In 2005, writer Jim Valentino said his aborted plans for the Marvel comic Guardians of the Galaxy involved Killraven, in his 50s, joining the team and forming an attraction to Yellowjacket (Rita DeMara). Valentino said he would have established Franklin Richards as Killraven's father.

Writer Robert Kirkman and artist Rob Liefeld announced in August 2007 they were creating a five-issue alternate universe Killraven miniseries planned for release in 2008, but the project never went into production.

== Fictional character biography ==
On the alternate-future Earth designated Earth-691 by Marvel Comics, the Martians from H. G. Wells' The War of the Worlds return in 2001 for another attempt at conquering the planet (they were later retconned as extrasolar aliens using Mars as a staging area). After humanity's enslavement, men not used as breeders or collaborators are trained and forced to battle gladiator-style for the Martians' amusement; women are used as breeders to supply infants, eaten by the Martians as a delicacy. Jonathan Raven, dubbed Killraven as his gladiatorial nom de guerre, escaped with the help of the gladiatorial "keeper", but without his brother, Deathraven. Killraven joined the Freemen, a group of freedom fighters against Martian oppression.

From 2018 to 2020, Killraven and his companions travel across the eastern portion of North America, from New York City to Cape Canaveral while searching for Killraven's lost brother. Pursued by the cyborg Skar, the Freemen encounter various victims of Martian transhuman experiments, as well as emotionally and psychologically scarred survivors.

Fugitives from the Martians, Killraven and his Freemen — his African American "mud-brother" M'Shulla Scott, the cynical and bitter Native American Hawk, and the slow-witted strongman Old Skull — meet and incorporate into their group the feisty scientist Carmilla Frost and Grok, her deformed, apelike clone. The Freemen ally with the human/plant hybrid Mint Julep, and battle Abraxas, Rattack and his rats, the High Overlord, and Skar. Killraven tames a mutated serpent-horse to use as his mount, and his Freemen battle Pstun-Rage in Battle Creek, Michigan. In this encounter, the antagonists' names are anagrams of the Battle Creek-based Kellogg Company's breakfast cereals. The Freemen meet the flirty and sensual Volcana Ash, who helps them battle Atalon and the Death-Breeders. After learning that his brother Joshua (Deathraven) is still alive, Killraven fights Martian slaves alongside a time-traveling Spider-Man, The Freemen eventually reach the Everglades, where they encounter a military cadre of survivors and the butterfly-like Mourning Prey.

Still later, the Freemen encounter Killraven's brother, Deathraven, and discover he has become a Martian collaborator.

In November 2020, the Martian occupation is over when Killraven unleashes a zombie plague on the Martians' food supply (humans and human infants).

== Powers and abilities ==
As a youth, gladiator-in-training Jonathan Raven's physical prowess was heightened thanks to injections of experimental chemicals by Keeper Whitman. He was later given mental powers through Whitman's psycho-electric experiments, including the psionic ability to project his consciousness into and take over a Martian's mind, and the psychic ability to resist mental assaults and to mask his presence from robot scanners.

Killraven is also a superb hand-to-hand combatant, and a highly skilled swordsman, wrestler, and martial artist. He is a master of most hand weaponry, especially shuriken. He is a master strategist in guerrilla warfare. Killraven possesses an encyclopedic knowledge of human history, art, and science predating the Martian invasion of A.D. 2001, implanted in his mind by Keeper Whitman.

As artist P. Craig Russell described, "Killraven has a sort of extrasensory ability to counterbalance his gladiatorial skills. He is very much the barbarian type, yet at the same time he has this seed planted in his brain that is the history of the human race — a racial memory of everything that has been obliterated by the Martians. It's almost a magical ability.... It was what removed him from being just another sword-wielding gladiator type."

Killraven wears bulletproof fabrics and leather. He is armed with various weapons as needed, and usually carried a sword and shuriken. He sometimes rides a mutated serpent-horse, or appropriated Martian vehicles and aircraft.

== Other versions ==
Killraven vol. 2, #3 (Feb. 2003). Cover art by Alan Davis.

There have been counterparts of Killraven in several stories:

- The Official Handbook of the Marvel Universe: Alternate Universes 2005 established that Killraven and the Guardiansshare the same timeline, set on the parallel universe Marvel Comics designates "Earth-691".
- The 1998-1999 miniseries Avengers Forever depicts Killraven as a member of an alternate future Avengers (Earth-9930) led by the Black Panther.
- Alan Davis' 2002 miniseries Killraven rebooted the series in a story set set on the parallel universe Marvel Comics designates "Earth-2120".
- Jon Raven is Will of the People in Earth-7305, a Captain Britain Corps member who featured in Excalibur #50.
- In an alternate future shown in Guardians of the Galaxy #18 (2009), Killraven leads the Guardians against the Martians in the year 3009.
- In 1975, Marvel UK's Planet of the Apes weekly comic reprinted the original Killraven feature as "Apeslayer", with artwork and lettering altered to suit.

=== Mainstream Marvel continuity ===
In the mainstream Marvel Universe that the company dubs Earth-616, Jonathan Raven appears in the 2006-2007 miniseries Wisdom. He is the son of Wisdom's MI-13 co-worker and lover, Maureen Raven, and the target of a trans-dimensional Martian Invasion because, as the Martian leader states, "On all Earths! Always! Every one of him is dangerous! Ruling council plan to invade all other Earths. So I urged this first expedition now before he is grown". Wisdom is forced to kill Maureen in order to stop the Martian invasion, while Jonathan is taken to an MI-6 safehouse in Prague and trained by martial artist Shang-Chi.

== Parodies ==
In Howard the Duck #2 (March 1976), the title character dreams of himself as "Killmallard".

== In other media ==
Hollywood trade stories in 2005 reported plans to adapt Killraven for a theatrical motion picture, with Marvel and Sony Pictures in negotiations with Robert Schenkkan to write a script. Those plans were abandoned and the rights of Killraven were reverted to Marvel.

== Collected editions ==
Title	Material collected	Published date	ISBN
Essential Killraven Volume 1: War Of The Worlds	Amazing Adventures (vol. 2) #18-39, Marvel Graphic Novel #7, Marvel Team-Up #45, Killraven (vol. 1) #1	July 2005	978-0785117773
Marvel Masterworks: Killraven Vol. 1	Amazing Adventures (vol. 2) #18-39, Marvel Graphic Novel #7	October 2018	978-1302911355
Killraven Epic Collection: Warrior Of The Worlds	Amazing Adventures (vol. 2) #18-39, Marvel Graphic Novel #7, Marvel Team-Up #45	October 2021	978-1302932169
Killraven	Killraven (vol. 2) #1-6	June 2007	978-0785125389

== See also ==
- List of African-American firsts
