= Rich Buckler =

American comic book artist and penciller

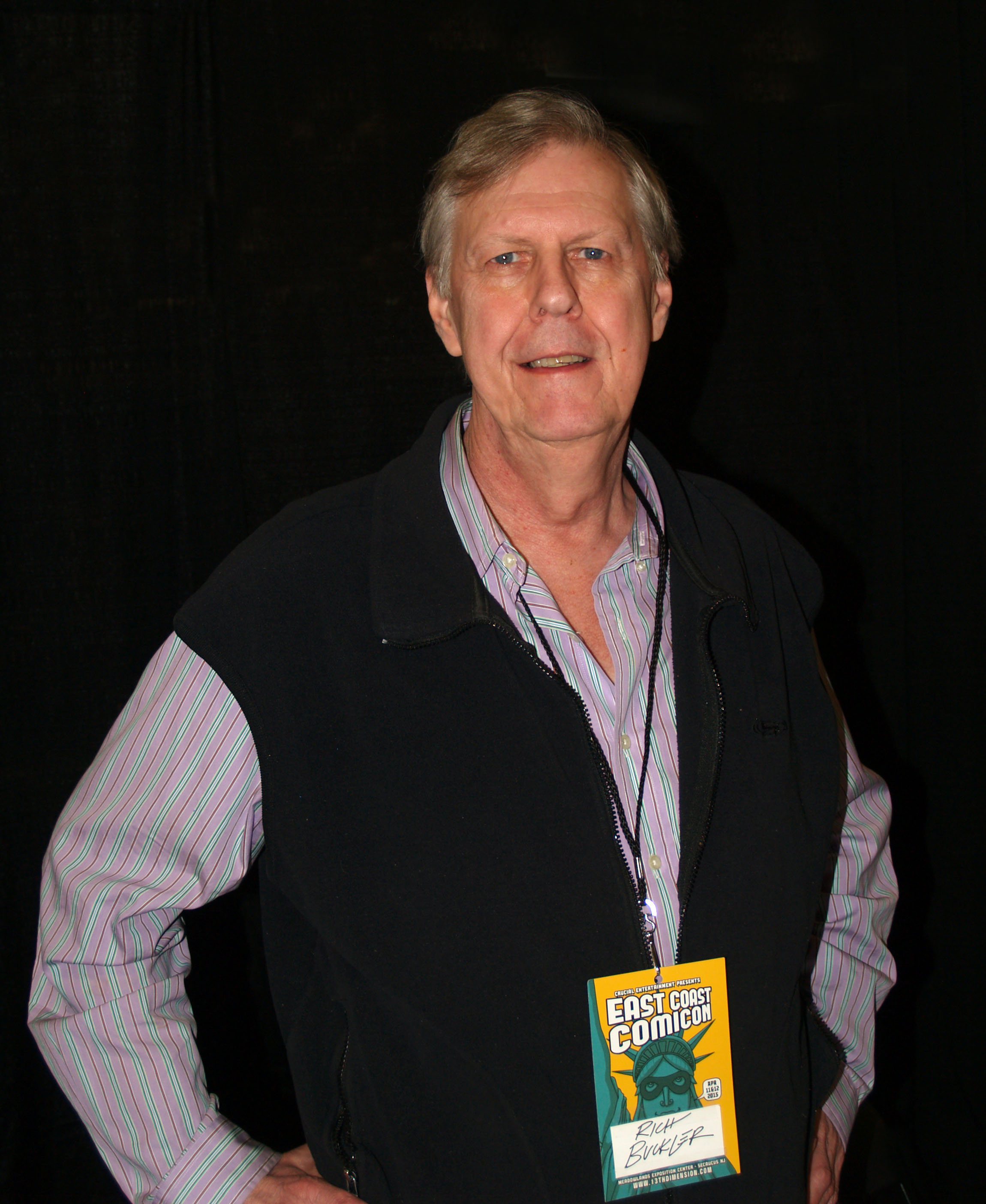
- Buckler at the 2015 East Coast Comicon in Secaucus, New Jersey
- Born: February 6, 1949 Detroit, Michigan, U.S.
- Died: May 19, 2017 (aged 68)
- Areas: Writer, Penciller
- Pseudonym: Ron Validar
- Notable works: All-Star Squadron; Astonishing Tales (Deathlok); Fantastic Four; Superman vs. Shazam! World's Finest Comics

Rich Buckler (February 6, 1949 – May 19, 2017) was an American comics artist and penciller, best known for his work on Marvel Comics' Fantastic Four in the mid-1970s and for creating the character Deathlok in Astonishing Tales #25. Buckler drew virtually every major character at Marvel and DC, often as a cover artist.

== Career ==
As a teenager in Detroit, Buckler was involved in comics fandom. He attended the initial iterations of the Detroit Triple Fan Fair, eventually running the convention along with originator Robert Brosch in 1969–1970.

Buckler's first comics work was as a teenager with the four-page historical story "Freedom Fighters: Washington Attacks Trenton" in the King Features comic book Flash Gordon #10 (cover-dated Nov. 1967). In 1971, he did some work for Skywald Publications but made a "wrong move" by attempting to date the daughter of Skywald's co-owner Israel Waldman. At DC Comics, he drew the "Rose and the Thorn" backup stories in Superman's Girl Friend, Lois Lane #117–121 (Dec. 1971–April 1972).

Buckler drew the first three issues of writer Don McGregor's Black Panther series in Jungle Action vol. 2, #6–8 (Sept. 1973–Jan. 1974), a run that Comics Bulletin in 2010 ranked third on its list of the "Top 10 1970s Marvels". He fulfilled a decade-long dream in 1974 when assigned to draw Marvel's flagship series, Fantastic Four, on which he stayed for two years. During this period, Buckler created the cyborg antihero Deathlok, who starred in an ongoing feature debuting in Astonishing Tales #25 (Aug. 1974). Also during this period, Buckler hired the young George Pérez as his studio assistant.

Buckler collaborated with writer Gerry Conway on a "Superman vs. Shazam!" story published in All-New Collectors' Edition #C-58 (April 1978). He drew the newspaper comic strip The Incredible Hulk for approximately six months in 1979. Buckler was one of several artists to draw the comics adaptation of Xanadu in Marvel Super Special #17 (Summer 1980). A Justice League story by Conway and Buckler originally intended for All-New Collectors' Edition saw print in Justice League of America #210–212 (Jan.–March 1983). Buckler and Roy Thomas then created the World War II superhero team the All-Star Squadron in a special insert in Justice League of America #193 (Aug. 1981) which led to the team's own title the following month.

In 1983,The Comics Journal accused Buckler of plagiarism, saying that he had a reputation as a "swipe" artist who copied poses and layouts from previous artists' work. Buckler sued the magazine for libel, but later dropped the suit.

Buckler worked for Archie Comics in 1983 and 1984, when that publisher briefly revived its Red Circle Comics superhero line, and he recruited Cary Burkett to write the Mighty Crusaders title. In 1985, Buckler returned to Marvel and briefly drew The Spectacular Spider-Man with writer Peter David, where they produced the storyline "The Death of Jean DeWolff". He also served as editor for a short-lived line of comics by Solson Publications, where in 1987 he created Reagan's Raiders.

He was the author of three books on comic book artistry: How to Become a Comic Book Artist and How to Draw Superheroes (Solson Publications) in 1986, and How to Draw Dynamic Comic Books (Vanguard Publications) in 2007.

In 2011, Buckler drew a Djustine short story written by Enrico Teodorani for the Italian market.

In 2015, he became an Inkwell Awards Ambassador.

== Pseudonym ==
Rich Buckler occasionally used the alias Ron Validar or simply Validar for his Marvel Comics work when he was on exclusive contract with rival DC.

== Death ==
Buckler died May 19, 2017, after a long battle with cancer.

== Bibliography ==
=== Arcana Studio ===
- Shadowflame #3 (inker) (2007)

=== Archie Comics ===
- Blue Ribbon Comics #4 (artist with Trevor von Eden, writer with Stan Timmons), #6–7, 11 (writer with Stan Timmons) (1983–84)
- Fly #1–2, 4 (1983)
- Lancelot Strong, The Shield #1 (writer) (1983)
- Mighty Crusaders #1–8 (penciller), #9–10 (inker) (1983–84)

=== Astral Comics ===
- Astral Comics #1 (1977)
- Galaxia Magazine #1 (1981)

=== Atlas/Seaboard Comics ===
- The Demon Hunter #1 (1975)
- Tales of Evil #3 (1975)
- Weird Suspense #3 (with Pat Boyette) (1975)

=== CFD Productions ===
- Forever Warriors #1 (artist with Jim Webb, writer with Roy Thomas and Matt Morello) (1997)
- The Invincibles #1 (also writer with Roy Thomas) (1997)

=== Continuity Comics ===
- Hybrids: The Origin #3–4 (1993)

=== DC Comics ===
- Action Comics (Atom) #447 (1975)
- All-New Collectors' Edition (Superman vs. Shazam!) #C–58 (1978)
- All-Star Squadron #1–5, 36 (full art); Annual #3 (among other artists) (1981–84)
- America vs. the Justice Society, miniseries, #1 (among other artists) (1985)
- Batman #265, 267, 329; (Robin) #239–242 (1972–80)
- DC Comics Presents #12, 33–34, 45, 49, Annual #1 (1979–82)
- DC Retroactive: Wonder Woman – The '80s #1 (2011)
- DC Special (Captain Comet) #27 (1977)
- DC Super Stars (Gorilla Grodd) #14 (1977)
- Detective Comics (Hawkman) #434, 446, 479 (1973–78)
- The Flash #271–272 (1979)
- Hardware #10, 12 (1993–94)
- House of Mystery #199, 258 (1972–78)
- House of Secrets #90 (1971)
- Jonah Hex #11 (1978)
- Justice League of America #188–191, 193, 210–212 (1981–83)
- Kobra #5 (1976)
- The New Adventures of Superboy #9 (1980)
- New Gods #15 (1977)
- Omega Men #34 (1986)
- Secret Origin of Superman (Leaf Comic Book Candy) (1980)
- Secrets of Sinister House #10 (inker) (1973)
- Secret Society of Super Villains #5–9 (1977)
- Star Hunters #4–7 (1978)
- Superman (Fabulous World of Krypton) #246, 251, 352 (1971–1980); (Bruce Wayne as Superman) #363 (1981); (Superman) #364, 369 (1981–82)
- Superman's Girl Friend, Lois Lane (Rose and Thorn) #117–121 (1971–72)
- Tales of the Teen Titans #51–54 (1985)
- Time Warp #1 (1979)
- The Unexpected #123, 126, 135, 157, 174 (1971–76)
- The Warlord #87–88 (inker), #89–90, 97 (1985)
- Weird War Tales #23, 123 (1974–83)
- Weird Western Tales (Jonah Hex) #37 (1976)
- Wonder Woman #300 (among other artists) (1983)
- World's Finest Comics (Hawkman) #257–258; (Superman and Batman) #259–261, 263–264, 266–267, 269–272, 275–276, 278, 280, 285–286 (1979–82)

=== Deluxe Comics ===
- Wally Wood's T.H.U.N.D.E.R. Agents #4 (1986)

=== Dynamite Entertainment ===
- Red Sonja #1973 (2015)

=== Gold Key Comics ===
- The Twilight Zone #47 (1973)

=== Image Comics ===
- Big Bang Comics #4 (among other artists) (1996)

=== King Comics ===
- Flash Gordon #10 (backup feature) (1967)

=== Lodestone Publishing ===
- Codename: Danger #1 (1985)

=== Malibu Comics ===
- Genesis #0 (1993)

=== Marvel Comics ===
- Adventure into Fear #11, 22 (penciller), #12 (inker) (1973–74)
- Amazing Adventures (Killraven) #25 (1974)
- Amazing Spider-Man and Captain America: Dr. Doom's Revenge (distributed with a computer game by Paragon Software) (1989)
- Astonishing Tales (Ka-Zar) #13 (with John Buscema), 16; (Deathlok) #25–28, #30–36 (1972–76)
- The Avengers #101–104, 106, 302–304, Giant-Size #1 (1972–74, 1989)
- Battlestar Galactica #6-7 (1979)
- Black Goliath #4 (1976)
- Black Knight miniseries #3–4 (1990)
- Captain America #243, 355 (1980, 1989)
- Captain America: The Medusa Effect (with M. C. Wyman) (1994)
- Conan The Barbarian #40 (1974)
- Daredevil #101 (1973)
- Doc Savage #8 (1974)
- Dracula Lives #1 (1973)
- Epic Illustrated #29 (1985)
- Fantastic Four #142–144, 147–153, 155–159, 161–163, 168–169, 171, 325, 329–335; Giant-Size #1, 3; Annual #22 (1974–76, 1989)
- Freddy Krueger's A Nightmare on Elm Street miniseries #1–2 (with Tony DeZuniga) (1989)
- The Incredible Hulk Annual #11 (1982)
- Invaders #5 (1976)
- Iron Man #196–197 (1985)
- Journey into Mystery vol. 2 #5 (1973)
- Jungle Action vol. 2 (Black Panther) #6–8 (full pencils), #22 (with Billy Graham) (1973–76)
- Luke Cage, Power Man #30 (1976)
- Marvel Comics Presents #24–31 (1989)
- Marvel Comics Super Special (Kiss) #1; (Xanadu) #17 (among other artists) (1977–80)
- Marvel Spotlight (Deathlok) #33 (1977)
- Marvel Super-Heroes vol. 2 (X-Men) #6 (1991)
- Marvel Team-Up (Spider-Man and Nightcrawler) #89 (with Mike Nasser) (1980)
- Micronauts Annual #2 (with Steve Ditko) (1980)
- Monsters on the Prowl #22 (new splash page for reprint story) (1973)
- Monsters Unleashed #8 (with George Perez) (1974)
- New Mutants #76–77 (1989)
- Saga of The Original Human Torch limited series #1–4 (1990)
- Saga of The Sub-Mariner limited series #1–12 (1988–89)
- Savage Sword of Conan #182 (1991)
- The Spectacular Spider-Man #103, 107–111, 116–117, 119, 122; Annual #1, 10 (1979, 1985–87, 1990)
- Starblast #4 (1994)
- Supernatural Thrillers #5 (1973)
- Tales of the Zombie #4 (1974)
- Thor #227–230 (1974)
- Vampire Tales #2–3, 5 (1973–74)
- What If? (Eternals) #24; (Thor) #25; (Namor) #29; (Spider-Man) #30 (1980–81)
- What If? vol. 2 (X-Men) #9 (1990)
- Where Monsters Dwell #15 (1972)
- X-Factor #50 (1990)

=== Now Comics ===
- Mr. T and the T-Force #7–10 (inker) (1994)
- Syphons: The Sygate Strategem #1–3 (1994–95)

=== Silverline Comics ===
- Assassins Inc. #2 (inker) (1987)

=== Skywald Publications ===
- Hell-Rider #2 (1971)
- Nightmare #3, #5 (with Bruce Jones) (1971)
- Psycho #2, 4–5 (1971)
- Scream #8 (1974)

=== Solson Publications ===
- Amazing Wahzoo #1 (1986)
- The Bushido Blade of Zatoichi Walrus #2 (1987)
- How to Become a Comic Book Artist (1986)
- How to Draw Monsters (1986)
- How To Draw Teenage Mutant Ninja Turtles #1 (1986)
- Reagan's Raiders #1–3 (1986–87)
- Rich Buckler's Secrets of Drawing Comics #1–4 (1986)
- Teenage Mutant Ninja Turtles Authorized Martial Arts Training Manual #1 (writer and inker) (1986)

=== S.Q.P. Inc. ===
- Hot Stuf' #1 (1974)
- Phase #1 (1971)

=== Tekno Comix (Big Entertainment) ===
- The Big Bang #1–14 (four-page backup feature that ran in most Tekno Comix titles in 1996)
- Gene Roddenberry's Lost Universe #5 (1995)

=== Tiger Comics ===
- Phantasy Against Hunger #1 (inker, among others) (1987)

=== Topps Comics ===
- Cadillacs and Dinosaurs #1 (1994)

=== Warrant Publishing ===
- The Creeps #1–3 (also writer in #2) (2014–2015)

=== Warren Publishing ===
- Creepy #36, 38, 75 (1970–75)
- Eerie #29, 48–49, 53 (1970–74)
- Vampirella #21 (1972)

Preceded by Barry Windsor-Smith	The Avengers artist 1972	Succeeded by John Buscema
Preceded by John Buscema	Fantastic Four artist 1974–1976	Succeeded by George Pérez
Preceded by José Luis García-López	World's Finest Comics artist 1979–1982	Succeeded by Trevor Von Eeden
Preceded by Keith Pollard	Fantastic Four artist 1989	Succeeded by Walt Simonson
