= Paul Gulacy =

American comics artist (born 1953)

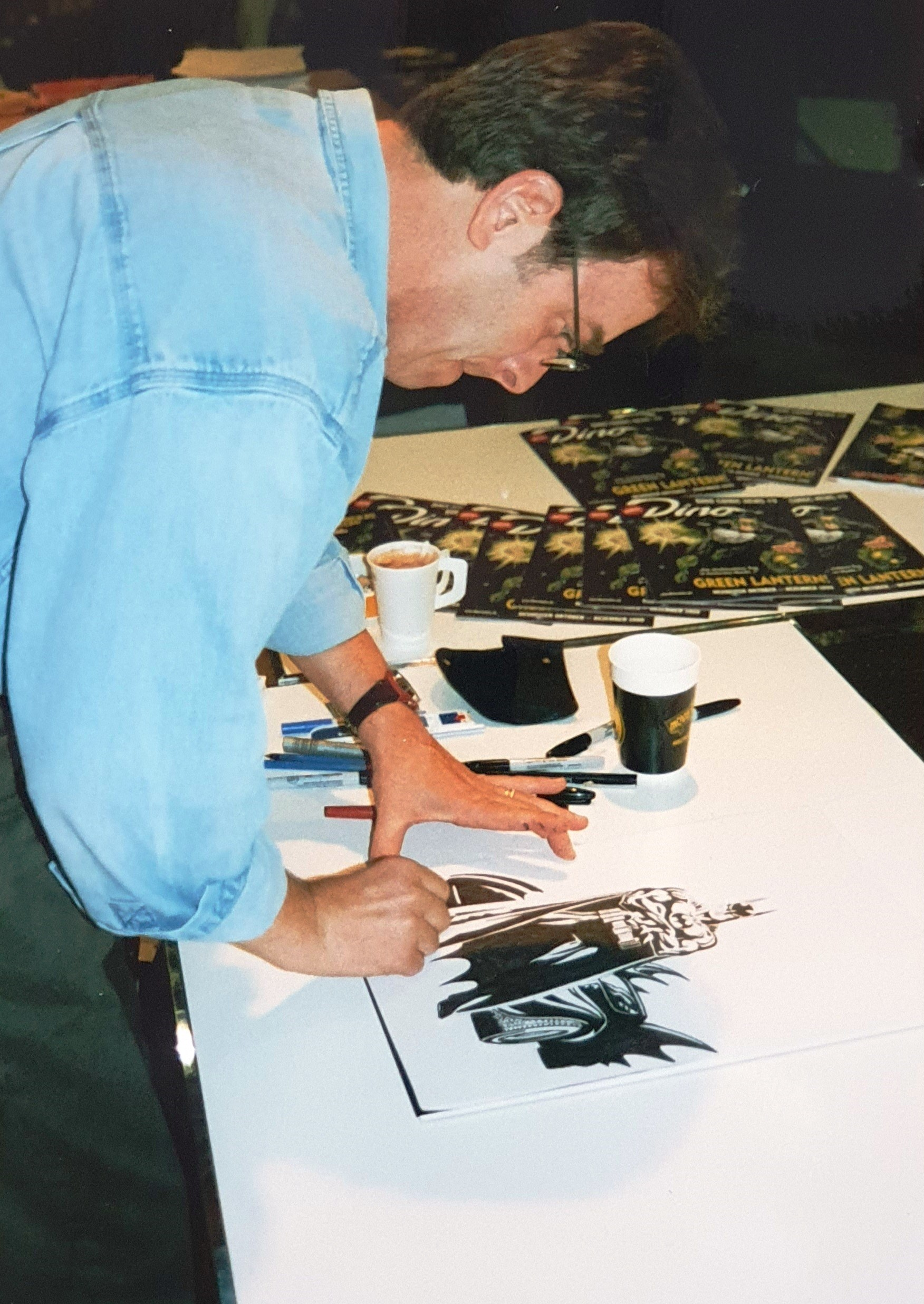
- Gulacy in 1999
- Born: August 15, 1953 (age 73)
- Area: Penciller
- Awards: Inkpot Award (1981); Haxtur Award (1997)

Paul Gulacy (/ɡəˈleɪsi/; born August 15, 1953) is an American comics artist best known for his work for DC Comics and Marvel Comics, and for drawing one of the first graphic novels, Eclipse Enterprises' 1978 Sabre: Slow Fade of an Endangered Species, with writer Don McGregor. He is most associated with Marvel's 1970s martial-arts and espionage series Master of Kung Fu.

== Biography ==
=== Early life and career ===
Paul Gulacy was raised in Youngstown, Ohio, and as a teen was inspired by the art of Jim Steranko on Marvel Comics' Nick Fury, Agent of S.H.I.E.L.D. He went on to study at the Art Institute of Pittsburgh. Fellow Youngstown resident Val Mayerik, a Marvel artist, introduced him to another local Marvel artist, Dan Adkins of East Liverpool, Ohio, for whom Gulacy would work as an assistant, and who suggested Gulacy prepare a six-page sample for Marvel. "He sent it to an editor named Roy Thomas", Gulacy recalled, "and two weeks later I got the phone call telling me I was hired."

Gulacy's initial work as a Marvel freelancer was penciling the 15-page story "Morbius, the Living Vampire" in Adventure into Fear #20 (cover-dated Feb. 1974), written by Mike Friedrich and inked by Jack Abel. Following this came an inking assignment, over penciler Bob Brown on the superhero comic Daredevil #108 (March 1974). At some unspecified point during this time, Gulacy did a small amount of artwork for the pornographic magazine Hustler, explaining that comics artist Jim Steranko, whom he had met through Adkins, had turned down what Gulacy called "a couple of jobs" and suggested Gulacy instead. "I did them. They offered me more and a lot of money, but I turned them down. ... I consider it a skeleton in my closet."

In 1974, Gulacy began work on the character with which he became most associated, the philosophical martial artist and secret agent Shang-Chi, in the comic Master of Kung Fu (cover-billed as The Hands of Shang-Chi: Master of Kung Fu) #18 (June 1974), inked by Al Milgrom. That initial story and one in the next issue were written by Steve Englehart, but issue #20 (Sept. 1974), co-written by Gerry Conway and Doug Moench, and the same month's Giant-Size Master of Kung Fu #1, written by Moench, marked the beginning of a Moench–Gulacy collaboration on the increasingly complex, cinematic feature about the son of longtime pulp fiction supervillain Fu Manchu, who teams with British intelligence to bring down his father's labyrinthine plans for global domination. With some exceptions, the writer–penciler team would continue through a serialized arc to issue #50 (March 1977), culminating with the apparent death of Fu Manchu. Comics historian Les Daniels observed that, "Ingenious writing by Doug Moench and energetic art by Paul Gulacy brought Master of Kung Fu new life." In 2010, Comics Bulletin ranked Moench and Gulacy's work on Master of Kung-Fu sixth on its list of the "Top 10 1970s Marvels".

In the later 1970s, Gulacy took on occasional other assignments, including the covers of the science fiction film adaptation Logan's Run #6 (June 1977) and of the Western The Rawhide Kid #147 (Sept. 1978), both for Marvel; and a 10-page preview of the graphic novel Sabre: Slow Fade of an Endangered Species, with writer Don McGregor, in the comics-magazine Heavy Metal vol. 2, #2 (June 1978; mislabeled "vol. 3, #2" in indicia).

=== Graphic-novel pioneer ===
Sabre (1978), one of the first graphic novels. Cover art by Gulacy.

With writer Don McGregor, Gulacy created one of the first American modern graphic novels, Eclipse Books' Sabre: Slow Fade of an Endangered Species. Published in August 1978—two months before Will Eisner's more famous graphic short story collection A Contract with God—it was the first graphic novel to be sold in the new "direct market" of comic-book stores. Described on the credits page as a "comic novel" (the term "graphic novel" not being in common usage at the time), the trade paperback was priced at a then-considerable $6.00. It helped prove the new format's viability by going into a February 1979 second printing. Eclipse would publish a 10th-anniversary edition (hardcover ISBN 0-913035-65-3; trade paperback ISBN 0-913035-59-9) with a new Gulacy cover. A 20th-anniversary edition was published by Image Comics in 1998, and a 30th anniversary edition by Desperado Publishing in 2009.

=== 1980s ===
In 1979 and 1980, Gulacy drew several horror/science fiction/fantasy stories for Warren Publishing's black-and-white comics magazines Eerie, Vampirella, and Warren Presents; some were reprinted in Eclipse Comics Nightmares #1–2 in 1985. Gulacy also drew the cover and the six-page story "Libido", written by his Master of Kung Fu colleague Doug Moench, in the comics magazine Epic Illustrated #3 (Fall 1980).

Along with the covers for independent publisher Capital Comics' superhero title Nexus #1–2 (1981–1982), Gulacy drew covers and an occasional story for such anthology series as Marvel's Marvel Preview and Bizarre Adventures and Eclipse Comics' Eclipse Magazine. In 1983, he drew several covers for independent AC Comics' Black Diamond, Americomics, Starmasters, and Femforce Special before reteaming with Moench on the four-issue, creator-owned Epic Comics miniseries Six from Sirius (July–October 1984) and its four-issue sequel, Six from Sirius II (December 1985–March 1986).

Through the remainder of the decade, he drew primarily for Eclipse (the company's revival of the 1940s series Airboy and a new spin-off, Valkyrie) and Dark Horse Comics. Gulacy also began working for DC Comics with Batman #393–394 (March–April 1986), and the six-issue miniseries Slash Maraud (November 1987–April 1988), co-created with Moench. The two also collaborated on a series of eight-page chapters starring the superhero Coldblood which ran in the biweekly omnibus Marvel Comics Presents #26–35 (August–November 1989).

=== Later career ===
During the 1990s, Gulacy worked primarily on Batman and such science fiction movie properties as Terminator, Predator, and Star Wars, and co-created the Valiant Comics crime series Grackle.

Among the many titles Gulacy has drawn are the DC Comics Batman, Batman: Legends of the Dark Knight ("Batman: Prey"), Batman: Outlaws, Year One: Batman/Ra's al Ghul, Catwoman, Green Lantern: Dragon Lord and JSA: Classified; Acclaim Comics' Eternal Warrior and Turok, Dinosaur Hunter; Dark Horse Comics' Star Wars: Crimson Empire; and Penthouse Comix's Omni Comix.

In 2002, he combined his interest in science fiction and spy stories in DC Comics' S.C.I. Spy, and that same year returned to his signature character with his and Doug Moench's six-issue Marvel miniseries Shang-Chi: Master of Kung Fu (November 2002 – April 2003). Other Marvel work includes collaborations with writer Marc Guggenheim on the four-issue miniseries Squadron Supreme: Hyperion vs. Nighthawk (March–June 2007) and with writer Cary Bates on True Believers.

== Personal life ==
As of 1989, Gulacy lived in Portland, Oregon, with his wife Valerie and their infant daughter Paige. In December 2008, he married wife Nanci. As of 2014 they remained married.

== Awards and nominations ==
- 1977: Winner of the Favourite Continued Comic Story Award at the Eagle Awards for Master of Kung Fu #48–51 with Doug Moench
- 1977: Nominated for Favourite Comic Book Artist Award at the Eagle Awards
- 1979: Winner of the Favourite Cover Award at the Eagle Awards for Master of Kung Fu #67
- 1981: Winner of Inkpot Award
- 1988: Nominated for "Best Art Team" Eisner Award, for Valkyrie, with Will Blyberg
- 1997: Winner of the Haxtur Award for "Best Artist"
- 1997: Nominated of the Haxtur Award for "Best Long Story"
- 1999: Nominated of the Haxtur Award for "Best Long Story"
- 2003: Nominated of the Haxtur Award for "Best Cover"
- 2016: Nominated for All-in-One Award, Inkwell Awards

== Bibliography ==
Comic books (interior pencil art) includes:

=== Dark Horse Comics ===
- James Bond 007: Serpent's Tooth (with Doug Moench)
- The Rook #1–2 (2016)
- Star Wars: Crimson Empire (with Mike Richardson/Randy Stradley, 1998)
- Star Wars: Crimson Empire II (with Mike Richardson/Randy Stradley, 1999)
- Terminator: Secondary Objectives (pencils, with James Robinson, 1991)
- The Thing from Another World: Eternal Vows (with David de Vries, 1993)

=== DC Comics ===
- Batman #393–394 (with Doug Moench, 1986)
- Batman: Legends of the Dark Knight #11–15, 137–141 (with Doug Moench, 1990–2001)
- Batman: Outlaws (with Doug Moench, 2000)
- Batman vs. Predator II: Bloodmatch #1–4 (with Doug Moench, 1995)
- Catwoman vol. 3 #25–40 (with Ed Brubaker, 2004–2005)
- Green Lantern: Dragon Lord (with Doug Moench, 2001)
- JSA Classified #10–13 (with Stuart Moore, 2006)
- Jonah Hex vol. 2 #12 (with Justin Gray/Jimmy Palmiotti, 2006)
- Slash Maraud #1–6 (with Doug Moench, 1987–1988)

==== America's Best Comics ====
- Tom Strong #34 (with Steve Moore and inks by Jimmy Palmiotti, 2006)

==== Vertigo ====
- Sci-Spy #1–6 (mini-series) (writer/artist, with co-author Doug Moench, 2002)

==== WildStorm ====
- Reload (pencils, with Warren Ellis, 2003)

=== Eclipse Comics ===
- Sabre (with Don McGregor, 1978)
- Valkyrie #1–3 (mini-series, with Chuck Dixon, 1988)

=== Marvel Comics ===
- Conan: The Skull of Set (graphic novel, with Doug Moench, 1989)
- Epic Illustrated #3 ("Libido" short story with Doug Moench, 1980)
- Marvel Comics Presents (Coldblood feature) #26–35 (with Doug Moench); (Shanna the She-Devil feature) #68–77 (with Gerard Jones, 1989–1991)
- Master of Kung Fu #18–20, 22, 25, 29–31, 33–35, 38–40, 42–50; Giant-Size #1–3 (with Doug Moench, 1974–1976)
- Master of Kung Fu vol. 2 #1–6 (with Doug Moench, 2002–2003)
- Penance: Relentless (with Paul Jenkins, 2007)
- Squadron Supreme: Hyperion vs. Nighthawk #1–4 (with Marc Guggenheim, 2007)
- True Believers #1–5 (mini-series) (with Cary Bates, 2008)

==== Epic Comics ====
- Six from Sirius #1–4 (with Doug Moench, 1984)
- Six from Sirius II #1–4 (with Doug Moench, 1986)

=== Books and compilations ===
- Spies, Vixens, and Masters of Kung Fu: The Art of Paul Gulacy edited by Michael Kronenberg and J. David Spurlock, 128 pages, Vanguard Press, November 2005, ISBN 978-1-887591-74-4
