= The Rook (comics) =

- The Rook. Dark Horse Comics cover art by Paul Gulacy; new stories by Steven Grant.

Publication information
- Publisher: Dark Horse Comics
- First appearance: Eerie #82 (March 1977)
- Created by: Bill DuBay

In-story information
- Alter ego: Restin Dane
- Team affiliations: The Time Force, The Infinity Force, Danse Macabre
- Abilities: Time travel

The Rook is a fictional, time-traveling comic book adventure hero. He first appeared in March 1977 in American company Warren Publishing's Eerie, Vampirella & Warren Presents magazines. In the 1980s, the Rook gained his own comic magazine title of the same name, The Rook Magazine. In the 1990s, The Rook would be recreated in Harris Comics’ Chains of Chaos and The Rook comic book miniseries. In 2014, The Rook was re-introduced in Dark Horse Comics’ Eerie Archives 17. The Rook returned with new adventures, written by Steven Grant and illustrated by Paul Gulacy in Dark Horse Presents and The Rook comic book series in 2015.

The Rook was created by Bill DuBay and Budd Lewis, and was influenced by pulp magazines’ heroic characters like Doc Savage.

== Fictional character biography ==
Scientific industrialist Restin Dane has a penchant for dressing as an Old West gun-slinger as he travels through time. Restin Dane is the grandson of Adam Dane, the man who told his story about those adventures in the future to his friend H. G. Wells, who turned his account into the book The Time Machine, but at Dane's insistence withheld his name.

Restin Dane's time machine is the Time Castle, a dark-energy powered vehicle that resembles a large rook chess piece; which is how Restin became known as The Rook. The Time Castle was created by Restin, with help from his grandfather's, Adam Dane's (the original Time Traveler*3) journals. Restin is no stranger to the space-time continuum either; having an undergraduate degree from Oxford in Engineering, Science and Physics and a PhD from Caltech in both Materials Science and Applied Physics-Quantum Mechanics. While at Oxford, he discovered artificial intelligence with his creation of two sanitation robots, Nuts & Bolts. Restin would later create a more complex robotic servant known as MAN-RS, an acronym for Man's Robotic Servant. The Rook's journeys through time reveal the illusion of human history and the separation between past, present and future. Restin Dane (The Rook) now travels not only through time, but through the "reality stream". Since The Rook's last documented appearance in the early 1980s, he has undergone significant changes: he now travels the reality stream in a different ship. It is much more eclipse than his old ship.

Another mystery surrounds Restin Dane's romantic entanglements. In the initial stories, Restin appears to be involved with January Boone, while Bishop Dane is involved with Katie McCall. Restin tells Katie he loves her as he departs on another mission. In a later issue, January calls him "lover". And yet, in "Terror of the Spaceways", Part II, Restin kisses another woman while in the future. Later on, it is established that Restin and Katie have a long-standing relationship.

== Creation ==
Early in 1976, many of Warren Publication's content was geared towards vampires, zombies and the sort. Jim Warren wanted to create the next big craze. Although he had been captivated by Superman in his youth, his real fascination was the adventure more than the superhero characters themselves. For this project, Warren enlisted Bill DuBay and Howard Peretz. Peretz had created children's toys for large toy manufacturers, while DuBay had stepped down earlier that year as editor from Warren magazines. Jim wanted a cowboy and Bill realized that his goals were no easy task since Westerns appeared to be a passé genre. Peretz eagerly agreed with Warren suggesting that Mattel could pull out their old toy molds from the 50s. Bill however was not as thrilled with the idea since it was he that would have to create the future from the past. Bill and his creative partner, Budd Lewis eventually conceived of a modern man in search of his roots, setting the story arc for the inaugural series in the old west. This would satisfy Jim and allow them the flexibility to serialize every great adventure trapped in time. The character would also be an inventor of robotic artificial intelligence, traveling through time as a swashbuckler of sorts. DuBay enlisted Jim Stenstrum, whom he considered the best writer that he had worked with. Bill and Jim would establish the first storylines that would thrust the Rook's adventures into the forefront of the reader's imaginations. Jim would design The Rook's costume in all black attire and the character was born.

The Rook's first adventures appeared in Eerie #82 (March 77). The character got more fan mail than any other Warren Publication character. By 1979, The Rook gravitated to his own title for 14 issues. Until February 1982, the distribution statistics were held close by the absent Jim Warren. In February, as a matter of federal mandate, circulation statements would be issued for the first and final time for all Warren titles; The Rook turned out to be Warren Publications' most popular title, followed by Creepy, Famous Monsters of Filmland, Eerie and Vampirella.

== International syndication ==
The Rook's adventures were also syndicated in 24 countries, in many languages, from the mid-seventies to the early nineties in Ediciones Delta's Dossier Negro and Delta magazines throughout Spain and Europe, Ekim's Vampirella in Turkey, Ibero Mundial de ediciones Rufus magazine throughout South America and in Eura Editoriale's Skorpio in Italy.

== Alternate realities (Harris Comics) ==
In 1994, Harris Publications (Comics) licensed the character for the miniseries Chains of Chaos with longtime Warren Publishing crossover character Vampirella. The following year, Mike Mignola, Tom Sniegoski, and Kirk Van Wormer teamed up for a five-part comic book miniseries, The Rook.

Rook being a scientist and an adventurer, he was recruited into Danse Macabre. One day he was attacked and he bonded with chaos skin as the last resort. Now he has a powersuit-living entity named Slough, and they need each other to survive. He responds to his mental commands and can form any weapon he can think of. (Comicvine) An altogether different proposition from his Warren predecessor; The Rook is now master of the reality flow, involving himself in alternate realities instead of contenting himself with hopping back through time. The first two issues have him fighting the undead in the Old West, though, while the latter two see him fighting hoods, one of whom is possessed by a piece of chaos manifesting as an embedded spider. The revised Rook is a half-cyborg who travels through time and alternate universes known as the reality stream. The Harris version of the Rook still retains an Old West heritage.

== Dark Horse Comics ==
Dark Horse Comics' Eerie Archives, which was released in twenty-seven volumes from 2009–2019, contains dozens of adventures that were previously unavailable beginning with volume 17 in 2014. In 2017, Dark Horse also released three volumes of W.B. DuBay's The Rook Archives, collecting part of The Rook comics' magazine run in Eerie issues 82–105 (though the character was not featured in issue 86) and Vampirella issue 70. Uncollected is The Rook magazine (14 issues) and subsequent appearances in Eerie #116, 120, 130, 132, 134, 136.

From September 2015 to January 2016 a four-issue mini-series of The Rook was published by Dark Horse, written by Steven Grant and illustrated by Paul Gulacy. The mini-series was collected in the trade paperback The Rook Volume 1: Save Yourself (2016), and was followed by the original graphic novel The Rook Volume 2: Desperate Times (2016). A press release described the series with "Seeking his roots, a time traveling adventurer stumbles across history’s darkest secret, Quarb: an immortal genius who has terrorized and shaped human culture since the dawn of man. Though seriously outgunned he begins a lone guerrilla war across time, in pasts unheard of and futures undreamed off, to free humanity from the immortal’s unending grip."
