= Gabriel the Devil Hunter =

Publication information
- Publisher: Marvel Comics
- First appearance: Haunt of Horror #2 (Jul 1974)
- Created by: Doug Moench and Billy Graham

In-story information
- Alter ego: Gabriel (surname unknown)
- Notable aliases: Gabriel Rosetti
- Abilities: Magic user, limited to exorcism

Gabriel the Devil Hunter is a fictional character appearing in American comic books published by Marvel Comics. The character has appeared as an exorcist in several of Marvel's occult titles.

A female version of the character named Gabriella Rosetti appeared in live action in the Marvel Cinematic Universe television series Helstrom, played by Ariana Guerra.

== Publication history ==
Gabriel first appeared in Haunt of Horror #2 (July 1974), and was created by Doug Moench and Billy Graham.

The character subsequently appears in Haunt of Horror #3–5 (September 1974 – January 1975), Monsters Unleashed #11 (April 1975), Fantastic Four #222–223 (September–October 1980), Marvel Comics Presents #106 (1992), Hellstorm: Prince of Lies #1–2 (April–May 1993), #5 (August 1993), #7–10 (October 1993 – January 1994), #12–14 (March–May 1994), #18 (September 1994), and #20–21 (November–December 1994).

Gabriel received an entry in The Official Handbook of the Marvel Universe: Horror #1 (2005).

== Fictional character biography ==
Gabriel was a teacher at Columbia University who returned home one day to discover his pregnant wife Andrea murdered, although, puzzlingly, all the doors and windows were locked from the inside, and she appeared to be holding the murder weapon in her own hand. To cope with his grief, Gabriel joined a seminary and eventually took holy orders as a priest. Gabriel was possessed by a demon named Catherine, who compelled him to rip out his right eye, set fire to his holy sacraments, and burn his own house down. Gabriel grabbed a red hot metal cross and held it to his naked chest, searing the shape of the cross into his flesh and driving the demon from his body. Gabriel later met with the mysterious woman Desadia, and the two embarked on the career of professional exorcists. Desadia eventually became Gabriel's wife.

Gabriel often worked for ordinary people, but he also occasionally assisted superhumans as well, such as Red Wolf. Gabriel maintained an office on the 13th floor of New York City's Empire State Building.

Gabriel learned of Franklin Richards' possession by Nicholas Scratch and came to the Baxter Building to perform the exorcism. Gabriel forced Scratch to show himself, and with Agatha Harkness, Franklin, as well as the Fantastic Four he went to New Salem, and kept Scratch subdued while travelling. Scratch augmented the powers of Salem's Seven, which allowed them to capture the group. Gabriel and Agatha Harkness were able to forge the Fantastic Four's love for Franklin into a weapon, and drove Scratch out.

Gabriel left before the Fantastic Four could thank him, and continued to be plagued by demons. He retired for a time, and earned a meager living by writing occult "news" stories for the tabloid World Gossip Weekly and performing mock exorcisms for people interested in the occult. It was revealed that Desadia had been killed by the powers of evil. Gabriel helped Daimon Hellstrom foil the designs of a Daimon Hellstrom impostor performing human sacrifices in San Francisco. During this sequence of events, Gabriel was also able to overcome his crippling depression.

Gabriel later came into conflict with Daimon Hellstrom again, and he spiraled back into depression and alcoholism, and was on the verge of suicide. He was contacted by the Asura, the assassins of Heaven, and was convinced to work for them as a killer of demons. He later acquired a "Breathing Gun", a firearm capable of killing demons.

A final confrontation with Hellstrom leaves Gabriel irretrievably insane, with Hellstrom leaving him in the care of Gargoyle. Gabriel returns in the Uncanny X-Men storyline "Wild Ride", where he is enlisted to cure Gambit of his demonic possession.

== Powers, abilities, and equipment ==
Gabriel is a trained exorcist, and if he failed to completely exorcise a demon, he was still able to suppress it, to minimize the harm it would cause its host. He had a cross-shaped scar burned into his chest, which he frequently used against the demons he fought. For a period of time he was also assisted during exorcisms by the spirit of his dead wife Andrea. While employed by the Asura, Gabriel owned a "Breathing Gun", a firearm that was able to harm or even kill demons.

Gabriel himself, either in spite of his abilities or because of them, was constantly plagued by demons attempting to possess him.

== In other media ==
A female version of the character named Gabriella Rosetti appears in Helstrom, played by Ariana Guerra. This version is a novitiate who is hired by Louise Hastings to eventually replace her as the head of Saint Teresa Center for Mental Health. Her faith is put to the test due to Daimon and Ana Helstrom's fight against Kthara, who has inhabited their mother Victoria. Despite questioning Daimon's methods, she falls in love with him, but is impregnated by Daimon when the two of them are possessed by Kthara and Basar, respectively. Rosetti's pregnancy is rapid and she gives birth to Kthara in human form. Horrified by the recent events, Rosetti joins the Blood.
