= Detectives Inc. =

- Detectives Inc.: A Terror of Dying Dreams (1985). Cover art by Gene Colan

Publication information
- Publisher: Eclipse Enterprises
- Formats: Original material for the series has been published as a set of graphic novels.
- Publication date: 1980: Detectives Inc.: A Remembrance of Threatening Green; 1985: Detectives Inc.: A Terror Of Dying Dreams
- Main character(s): Ted Denning, Bob Rainier

Creative team
- Writer(s): Don McGregor
- Artist(s): Marshall Rogers, Gene Colan
- Letterer(s): Tom Orzechowski, Mindy Eisman
- Editor(s): Dean Mullaney

Detectives Inc. is a series of two original graphic novels written by Don McGregor and published by Eclipse Enterprises in 1980 and 1985. The first, Detectives Inc.: A Remembrance of Threatening Green, featured black-and-white art by penciler-inker Marshall Rogers. The second, Detectives Inc.: A Terror Of Dying Dreams, was drawn by Gene Colan.

== Publication history ==
Page from the first Detectives Inc. graphic novel (1980), by Don McGregor and Marshall Rogers.

The books' genesis, author Don McGregor recalled, had gone back several years. "I had created Detectives Inc. as early as 1969, as roles for Alex Simmons and myself to play in Super8 millimeter movies I was making". In the early 1970s, the two produced a crude Detectives Inc. comic book, self-published via photocopier.

In 1980, Eclipse Enterprises published Detectives Inc.: A Remembrance of Threatening Green, the first of what would become two graphic novels in this series, both written by McGregor. This initial book featured black-and-white art by penciler-inker Marshall Rogers. The second book, Detectives Inc.: A Terror Of Dying Dreams, followed in 1985, drawn by Gene Colan, and printed directly from his detailed pencils; a later comic-book reprinting added a sepia-tone wash in place of inking. In the American comics market, these two graphic novels were among the first not featuring superhero or science fiction/fantasy stories, and A Remembrance of Threatening Green (1980) was the first naturalistic graphic novel to follow Will Eisner's influential A Contract with God. The Gay League's "LBGT Comics Timeline" cites the book as "featuring the first lesbian characters in mass-market comics".

Eclipse Comics later reprinted the two graphic novels as color comic-book miniseries, dividing the former into two issues (1985) and the latter into three (June, Sept., Dec. 1987), with new Colan covers inked by Steve Leialoha. The graphic novels themselves were reissued by Image Comics in 2001 (ISBN 1-58240-084-9 and ISBN 1-58240-097-0, respectively).

In 1985, McGregor wrote and directed a low-budget, shot-on-video movie version of Detectives Inc., which has been shown at comic book conventions but remains unreleased commercially.

== Plot ==
Set in and around New York City, the two humanistic mystery-dramas each stars interracial-buddy private detectives Ted Denning and Bob Rainier. A Remembrance of Threatening Green involves a midwife hiring the investigators to find who killed her lesbian lover. In A Terror of Dying Dreams, a social worker has the duo investigate a wife-beating millionaire.

== Critical assessment ==
In a contemporaneous review of the first book, Kim Thompson of The Comics Journal described Detectives Inc.: A Remembrance of Threatening Green as "a disastrously mawkish and disjointed attempt to lash together pulp fiction (in this case, a detective story) with a serious theme." Conversely, Peter Gillis of Comics Feature found it "tense and powerful and draws one into its action…. [the creators] assert (and show) that two detectives, the divorced wife, two lovers separated by death from their common object of passion and others, can be just as exciting, as powerful, as dramatic an ensemble as the Avengers or the Justice League of America.”

Later assessments were largely positive. As a commentator at Ain't It Cool News wrote in 2001,

McGregor sought to create a realistic private detective comic book, and he succeeded in spades, producing a violent, touching and emotional story. ...[W]hat’s going on with the characters, how they relate to one another and the others in their lives, is equally as important as the plots they find themselves in. McGregor is as interested in why people do what they do and how they deal (or are unable to deal) with the demons they carry around. For the detectives, sometimes it seems the case is just a way of distracting them from their own problems, such as Denning’s attempts to deal with killing a teenage boy to save his partner in the prologue to the story, or Rainer’s ever-present strained relationship with his ex-wife".

Writing of the 2001 edition of A Terror of Dying Dreams, Ben Herman of the website NegativePop.com said the story "is as much about these three individuals as it is about the solving of a mystery" and that "McGregor's introspective writing superbly portrays these characters, and establishes the realities they live in. While still occasionally ponderous, for the most part McGregor's narration is strikingly appropriate." He found Colan's black-and-white art, reproduced directly from pencil, "crisp and stunning. ... Visible is the intricate detail of his work, the subtle gradations of shadow and lighting that he utilizes. The emotions of McGregor's characters are vividly brought to life by Colan's illustration of their facial expressions and fluid body language."
