= Essential Marvel =

Line of black & white comic reprint collections

Essential Marvel was a line published by Marvel Comics from 1996–2013 that reprinted vintage comic book material in paperback format. Each black-and-white volume reprints approximately 20–30 issues of a classic Marvel title (mostly from the Silver Age or Bronze Age). Each Essential contains between 450 and 650 pages, printed on coarse, matte-quality paper.

DC Comics had a similar range of black-and-white reprint paperbacks, Showcase Presents (in the same way, the Marvel Masterworks line is the equivalent of DC's DC Archive Editions) that ran from 2005-2016.

== History ==
The Essential range launched in October 1996 with the joint release of Essential X-Men Vol. 1, Essential Wolverine Vol. 1 and Essential The Amazing Spider-Man Vol. 1. While Essential The Amazing Spider-Man started with Spider-Man's first appearance in the Silver Age (collecting Amazing Fantasy #15 and The Amazing Spider-Man #1-20), Marvel chose to skip ahead to Giant-Size X-Men #1 and Uncanny X-Men #94-119, the relaunch of the title that sparked the X-Men's popularity in the late 1970s and 1980s. The decision to skip the original X-Men in favor of starting with the more well-known "All-New, All-Different" X-Men was controversial, though Marvel ultimately went back and began a new collection of Essential volumes, titled Essential Classic X-Men, to collect the earliest X-Men stories (originally titled Essential Uncanny X-Men in the first volume).

A new trade dress for the line was introduced in 2001. All the older volumes (excluding Essential Conan Vol. 1) were eventually reprinted with the new design. The new printings also corrected printing mistakes from previous volumes (such as the fact that both Essential X-Men Vol. 1 and Vol. 2 both have missing pages from their earlier printings) and reshuffled content to put volume breaks in more logical places, continuity-wise.

From May 2005 onward, many of the volumes were reprinted for a third time, with different cover artwork. Initially, the Essential line used newly produced artwork, but these new printings used art from the material they reprinted; the legal indicia in each volume listed them as "Second Edition, First Printing".

In 2008, the line's trade dress was revised and given a new look, again initially on older volumes that were going back to press for new printings.

Marvel came under criticism for censoring some of the Essential books, specifically Essential Tomb of Dracula Vol. 3 and Vol. 4, in which digital editing was used to remove or obscure brief nudity. Both volumes contained reprints of Dracula stories originally published by Marvel in magazine format, which permitted the use of nudity in artwork.

The last volumes were published in December 2013, with the line being cancelled and replaced with the Marvel Epic Collection.

== Volumes ==
Title	Volume	Years covered	Material collected	Pages	ISBN	Publication date (first edition)
The Amazing Spider-Man	1	1962–1965	Amazing Fantasy #15; The Amazing Spider-Man #1-20, Annual #1	552	0-7851-2192-7	1996-12-11
The Amazing Spider-Man	2	1965–1966	The Amazing Spider-Man #21-43, Annual #2-3	536	0-7851-1863-2	1997-08-06
The Amazing Spider-Man	3	1967–1968	The Amazing Spider-Man #44-68; Second edition switches #66-68 for Annual #4; Third edition adds Spectacular Spider-Man magazine #1	528	0-7851-1864-0	1998-07-29
The Amazing Spider-Man	4	1968–1970	The Amazing Spider-Man #69-89, Annual #4-5; Second edition switches Annual #4 for #66-68; Third edition adds Spectacular Spider-Man magazine #2	552	0-7851-1865-9	2000-12-01
The Amazing Spider-Man	5	1970–1972	The Amazing Spider-Man #90-113	528	0-7851-2379-2	2002-03-01
The Amazing Spider-Man	6	1972–1974	The Amazing Spider-Man #114-137; Giant-Size Super-Heroes #1; Giant-Size Spider-Man #1-2	576	0-7851-1365-7	2004-07-01
The Amazing Spider-Man	7	1974–1976	The Amazing Spider-Man #138-160, Annual #10; Giant-Size Spider-Man #4-5	560	0-7851-1879-9	2005-10-26
The Amazing Spider-Man	8	1976–1978	The Amazing Spider-Man #161-185, Annual #11; Giant-Size Spider-Man #6; Nova #12	512	978-0785125006	2007-04-18
The Amazing Spider-Man	9	1978–1980	The Amazing Spider-Man #186-210, Annual #12-14; Peter Parker, the Spectacular Spider-Man Annual #1	600	978-0785130741	2009-05-06
The Amazing Spider-Man	10	1980–1982	The Amazing Spider-Man #211-230, Annual #15	600	978-0785157472	2011-06-29
The Amazing Spider-Man	11	1982–1984	The Amazing Spider-Man #231-248, Annual #16-17	504	978-0785163305	2012-06-27
Astonishing Ant-Man	1	1962–1965	Tales to Astonish #27, #35-69	576	0-7851-0822-X	2002-02-01
Avengers	1	1963–1966	The Avengers #1-24	536	0-7851-1862-4	1998-11-18
Avengers	2	1966–1967	The Avengers #25-46, Annual #1	528	0-7851-0741-X	2000-06-01
Avengers	3	1967–1969	The Avengers #47-68, Annual #2; Later edition adds X-Men #45 & Marvel Super-Heroes #17	520	0-7851-0787-8	2001-03-01
Avengers	4	1969–1972	The Avengers #69-97; The Incredible Hulk (vol. 2) #140	640	0-7851-1485-8	2004-10-01
Avengers	5	1972–1974	The Avengers #98-119; Daredevil #99; The Defenders #8-11	552	0-7851-2087-4	2006-01-25
Avengers	6	1974–1975	The Avengers #120-140; Giant-Size Avengers #1-4; Captain Marvel #33; The Fantastic Four #150	576	978-0-7851-3058-1	2008-02-20
Avengers	7	1975–1977	The Avengers #141-163, Annual #6; Super-Villain Team-Up #9	480	0-7851-4453-6	2010-01-08
Avengers	8	1977–1979	The Avengers #164-184, Annual #7-8; Marvel Two-in-One Annual #2	488	0-7851-6322-0	2012-04-25
Avengers	9	1979–1981	Avengers #185-206, Annual #9, Tales to Astonish (vol. 2) #12	496	978-0-7851-8411-9	2013-09-24
Black Panther	1	1972–1977	Jungle Action #6-22, 24; Black Panther #1-10	528	0-7851-6323-9	2012-05-07
Captain America	1	1964–1968	Tales of Suspense #59-99; Captain America #100-102	528	0-7851-0740-1	2000-03-01
Captain America	2	1968–1970	Captain America #103-126	512	0-7851-0827-0	2002-01-01
Captain America	3	1970–1972	Captain America #127-156	608	0-7851-2166-8	2006-12-06
Captain America	4	1973–1975	Captain America #157-186	600	978-0785127703	2008-01-09
Captain America	5	1975–1977	Captain America #187-205, Annual #3; Captain America's Bicentennial Battles	480	0785145354	2010-06-23
Captain America	6	1977–1979	Captain America #206-230, Annual #4; The Incredible Hulk (vol. 2) #232	512	978-0785150916	2011-04-06
Captain America	7	1979-1981	Captain America #231-257	528	978-0785184096	2013-07-23
Captain Marvel	1	1967–1970	Marvel Super-Heroes #12-13; Captain Marvel #1-21; Not Brand Echh #9	528	978-0785130598	2008-05-21
Captain Marvel	2	1972–1976	Captain Marvel #22-35, #37-46; Iron Man #55; Marvel Feature #12 and the framing sequence from #36's reprint of Marvel Super-Heroes #12	520	978-0785145363	2013-03-26
Classic X-Men	1	1963–1966	(formerly Uncanny X-Men Vol. 1); X-Men #1-24	528	0-7851-0991-9	1999-06-01
Classic X-Men	2	1966–1969	X-Men #25-53; The Avengers #53	640	0-7851-2116-1	2006-05-17
Classic X-Men	3	1969–1975	X-Men #54-66, 67-93 (covers only); Marvel Team-Up #4; Amazing Adventures (vol. 2) #11-17 (Beast solo feature); The Incredible Hulk (vol. 2) #150, 161; The Amazing Spider-Man #92	560	978-0-7851-3060-4	2009-02-18
Conan the Barbarian	1	1970–1973	Conan the Barbarian #1-25	530	0-7851-0751-7	2000-07-01
Daredevil	1	1964–1967	Daredevil #1-25	544	0-7851-1861-6	2002-10-01
Daredevil	2	1967–1969	Daredevil #26-48, Annual #1; The Fantastic Four #73	568	0-7851-1462-9	2004-06-01
Daredevil	3	1969–1971	Daredevil #49-74; Iron Man #35-36	584	0-7851-1724-5	2005-08-24
Daredevil	4	1971–1973	Daredevil #75-101; The Avengers #111	600	978-0785127628	2007-09-12
Daredevil	5	1973–1975	Daredevil #102-125; Marvel Two-in-One #3	488	978-0785144540	2010-02-10
Daredevil	6	1975–1977	Daredevil #126-146, Annual #4; Iron Man #88-89; Ghost Rider (vol. 2) #20	480	978-0785185086	2013-11-26
Dazzler	1	1980–1982	Dazzler #1-21; Uncanny X-Men #130-131; The Amazing Spider-Man #203	552	978-0785126959	2007-08-22
Dazzler	2	1982–1986	Dazzler #22-42; Marvel Graphic Novel No. 12 - Dazzler: The Movie; Beauty and the Beast #1-4; Secret Wars II #4	688	978-0785137306	2009-05-13
The Defenders	1	1969–1974	Doctor Strange #183; The Sub-Mariner #22, 34-35; The Incredible Hulk (vol. 2) #126; Marvel Feature #1-3; The Defenders #1-14; The Avengers #115-118	544	0-7851-3075-6	2005-05-18
The Defenders	2	1974–1976	The Defenders #15-30; Giant-Size Defenders #1-5; Marvel Two-in-One #6-7; Marvel Team-Up #33-35; Marvel Treasury Edition #12	616	0-7851-2150-1	2006-12-20
The Defenders	3	1976–1978	The Defenders #31-60, Annual #1	592	978-0785126966	2007-07-18
The Defenders	4	1978–1981	The Defenders #61-91	584	978-0785130611	2008-07-16
The Defenders	5	1981–1982	The Defenders #92-106; Marvel Team-Up #101, 111 and 116; Captain America #268	448	978-0785145370	2010-08-04
The Defenders	6	1982–1983	The Defenders #107-124; The New Defenders #125; The Avengers Annual #11; Marvel Team-Up #119	528	978-0785157540	2011-10-12
The Defenders	7	1983–1985	The New Defenders #126-139; Iceman #1-4; Beauty and the Beast #1-4	528	978-0785184058	2013-05-07
Doctor Strange	1	1963–1968	Strange Tales #110-111, 114-168	608	0-7851-2316-4	2002-01-01
Doctor Strange	2	1968–1974	Doctor Strange #169-178, 180-183; The Avengers #61; The Sub-Mariner #22; The Incredible Hulk (vol. 2) #126; Marvel Feature #1; Marvel Premiere #3-10, 12-14	608	0-7851-1668-0	2005-03-23
Doctor Strange	3	1974–1978	Doctor Strange (vol. 2) #1-29, Annual #1; The Tomb of Dracula #44-45	616	978-0785127338	2007-12-26
Doctor Strange	4	1978–1982	Doctor Strange (vol. 2) #30-56; Chamber of Chills #4; The Man-Thing (vol. 2) #4	564	978-0785130628	2009-07-22
The Fantastic Four	1	1961–1963	The Fantastic Four #1-20, Annual #1	544	0-7851-1828-4	1998-11-04
The Fantastic Four	2	1963–1965	The Fantastic Four #21-40, Annual #2; Strange Tales Annual #2	528	0-7851-0731-2	1999-10-20
The Fantastic Four	3	1965–1967	The Fantastic Four #41-63, Annual #3-4	536	0-7851-2625-2	2001-08-01
The Fantastic Four	4	1967–1969	The Fantastic Four #64-83, Annual #5-6	536	0-7851-1484-X	2005-06-29
The Fantastic Four	5	1969–1971	The Fantastic Four #84-110, Annual #7-8	568	0-7851-2162-5	2006-06-21
The Fantastic Four	6	1971–1973	The Fantastic Four #111-137	592	978-0785126973	2007-05-23
The Fantastic Four	7	1973–1975	The Fantastic Four #138-159; Giant-Size Super-Stars #1; Giant-Size Fantastic Four #2-4; The Avengers #127	560	978-0785130635	2008-07-16
The Fantastic Four	8	1975–1977	The Fantastic Four #160-179, 181-183, Annual #11; Marvel Two-in-One #20, Annual #1	520	978-0785145387	2010-05-26
The Fantastic Four	9	1977–1979	The Fantastic Four #184-188, 190-207, Annual #12-13	512	978-0785184102	2013-08-27
Ghost Rider	1	1972–1976	Marvel Spotlight #5-12; Ghost Rider (vol. 2) #1-20; Daredevil #138	560	0-7851-1838-1	2005-10-05
Ghost Rider	2	1976–1980	Ghost Rider (vol. 2) #21-50	568	978-0785121640	2007-02-14
Ghost Rider	3	1980–1982	Ghost Rider (vol. 2) #51-65; Marvel Two-in-One #80; Marvel Super-Heroes #11; The Avengers #214	416	0785130640	2009-11-04
Ghost Rider	4	1982–1985	Ghost Rider (vol. 2) #66-81; The Amazing Spider-Man #274; The New Defenders #145-146	432	978-0785145394	2010-10-27
Godzilla, King of the Monsters	1	1977–1979	Godzilla, King of the Monsters #1-24	440	0-7851-2153-6	2006-03-29
Howard the Duck	1	1973, 1975–1978	Adventure into Fear #19; Giant-Size Man-Thing #4-5; Howard the Duck #1-27, Annual #1; Marvel Treasury Edition #12	592	0-7851-0831-9	2002-02-01
The Human Torch	1	1962–1965	Strange Tales #101-134, Annual #2	504	0-7851-1309-6	2003-08-25
The Incredible Hulk	1	1962–1967	The Incredible Hulk #1-6; Tales to Astonish #60-91; Later edition adds Tales to Astonish #59	528	0-7851-2374-1	1999-02-01
The Incredible Hulk	2	1967–1969	Tales to Astonish #92-101; The Incredible Hulk (vol. 2) #102-117, Annual #1	520	0-7851-0795-9	2001-09-01
The Incredible Hulk	3	1969–1971	The Incredible Hulk (vol. 2) #118-142; Captain Marvel #20-21; The Avengers #88	576	0-7851-1689-3	2005-05-11
The Incredible Hulk	4	1971–1973	The Incredible Hulk (vol. 2) #143-170	608	0-7851-2193-5	2006-09-27
The Incredible Hulk	5	1974–1976	The Incredible Hulk (vol. 2) #171-200, Annual #5	619	0-7851-3065-9	2008-12-03
The Incredible Hulk	6	1976–1978	The Incredible Hulk (vol. 2) #201-225, Annual #6	496	0-7851-3065-9	2010-09-15
The Incredible Hulk	7	1978–1980	The Incredible Hulk (vol. 2) #226-248, Annual #7-9, Captain America #230	544	978-0-7851-8511-6	2013-12-24
Iron Fist	1	1974–1978	Marvel Premiere #15-25; Iron Fist #1-15; Marvel Team-Up #63-64; Luke Cage, Power Man #48-49; Power Man and Iron Fist #50	584	0-7851-1546-3	2004-10-01
Iron Man	1	1963–1965	Tales of Suspense #39-72	512	0-7851-1860-8	2000-09-01
Iron Man	2	1966–1968	Tales of Suspense #73-99; Tales to Astonish #82; Iron Man and the Sub-Mariner #1; Iron Man #1-11	608	0-7851-1487-4	2004-11-24
Iron Man	3	1969–1971	Iron Man #12-38; Daredevil #73	592	978-0785127642	2008-04-16
Iron Man	4	1971–1973	Iron Man #39-61	488	978-0785142546	2010-04-14
Iron Man	5	1973–1976	Iron Man #62-75, 77-87 and 76 (cover only), Iron Man Annual #3	520	978-0785167334	2013-04-23
Killraven	1	1973–1976, 1983, 2001	Amazing Adventures (vol. 2) #18-39; Marvel Team-Up #45; Marvel Graphic Novel No. 7 - Killraven: Warrior of the Worlds; Killraven #1 (Marvel Knights)	504	0-7851-1777-6	2005-07-20
Luke Cage, Power Man	1	1972–1975	Luke Cage, Hero For Hire #1-16; Luke Cage, Power Man #17-27	544	0-7851-1685-0	2005-03-02
Luke Cage, Power Man	2	1975–1978	Luke Cage, Power Man #28-49, Annual #1	424	0-7851-2147-1	2006-08-30
Man-Thing	1	1971–1975	Savage Tales #1; Astonishing Tales #12-13; Adventure into Fear #10-19; The Man-Thing #1-14; Giant-Size Man-Thing #1-2; Monsters Unleashed #5, 8-9	544	0-7851-2135-8	2006-12-13
Man-Thing	2	1975–1981	The Man-Thing #15-22; The Man-Thing (vol. 2) #1-11; Giant-Size Man-Thing #3-5; Rampaging Hulk #7; Marvel Team-Up #68; Marvel Two-in-One #43; Doctor Strange (vol. 2) #41	536	0-7851-3066-7	2008-08-20
Marvel Horror	1	1973–1977, 1979	The Son of Satan stories from: Ghost Rider (vol. 2) #1-2; Marvel Spotlight #12-24; Son of Satan #1-8; Marvel Two-in-One #14; Marvel Team-Up #32; Satana the Devil's Daughter stories from: Vampire Tales #2-3; Haunt of Horror #2, 4-5; Marvel Premiere #27; Marvel Preview #7; Marvel Team-Up #80-81	608	0-7851-2196-X	2006-11-01
Marvel Horror	2	1973–1977	N'Kantu the Living Mummy stories from: Supernatural Thrillers #5, 7-15; Gabriel the Devil Hunter stories from: Haunt of Horror #2-5; Monsters Unleashed #11; Brother Voodoo stories from: Strange Tales #169-173; Tales of the Zombie #6, 10; Marvel Team-Up #24; The Golem stories from: Strange Tales #174, 176-177; Marvel Two-in-One #11; The Scarecrow stories from: Dead of Night #11; Marvel Spotlight #26; Marvel Two-in-One #18; Modred the Mystic stories from: Marvel Chillers #1-2; Marvel Two-in-One #33	616	978-0-7851-3067-3	2008-11-26
Marvel Saga	1	1985–1986	Marvel Saga #1-12	448	978-0785127277	2008-01-16
Marvel Saga	2	1986–1987	Marvel Saga #13-25	480	978-0785127284	2008-12-24
Marvel Team-Up	1	1972–1974	Marvel Team-Up #1-24	496	0-7851-2373-3	2002-04-10
Marvel Team-Up	2	1974–1976	Marvel Team-Up #25-51; Marvel Two-in-One #17	528	0-7851-2163-3	2006-08-02
Marvel Team-Up	3	1976–1978	Marvel Team-Up #52-73, 75, Annual #1	584	978-0785130680	2009-08-19
Marvel Team-Up	4	1978-1980	Marvel Team-Up #76-78, 80-98, Annual #2-3	480	978-0785167341	2013-02-26
Marvel Two-in-One	1	1973–1977	Marvel Feature #11-12; Marvel Two-in-One #1-20, 22-25, Annual #1; Marvel Team-Up #47; The Fantastic Four Annual #11	576	0-7851-1729-6	2005-11-02
Marvel Two-in-One	2	1977–1979	Marvel Two-in-One #26-52, Annual #2-3	568	978-0785126980	2007-06-27
Marvel Two-in-One	3	1979–1981	Marvel Two-in-One #53-77, Annual #4-5	592	978-0785130697	2009-07-29
Marvel Two-in-One	4	1981–1983	Marvel Two-in-One #78-98, 100, Annual #6-7	608	978-0785162841	2012-01-25
Monster of Frankenstein	1	1972–1975	The Monster of Frankenstein #1-5; The Frankenstein Monster #6-18; Giant-Size Werewolf #2; Monsters Unleashed #2, 4-10; Legion of Monsters #1	496	0-7851-1634-6	2004-10-20
Moon Knight	1	1975–1976, 1978–1981	Werewolf by Night #32-33; Marvel Spotlight #28-29; Peter Parker, the Spectacular Spider-Man #22-23, Marvel Two-in-One #52; The Hulk! magazine #11-15, 17-18, 20; Marvel Preview #21; Moon Knight #1-10; Marvel Team-Up Annual #4	560	0-7851-2092-0	2006-03-01
Moon Knight	2	1981–1983	Moon Knight #11-30	608	978-0785127291	2007-10-17
Moon Knight	3	1983–1989	Moon Knight #31-38; Moon Knight: Fist of Khonshu #1-6; Marvel Fanfare #30, 38-39; Solo Avengers #3; Marvel Super-Heroes #1	528	978-0785130703	2009-12-02
Ms. Marvel	1	1977–1979, 1981, 1992	Ms. Marvel #1-23; Marvel Super-Heroes Magazine #10-11; Avengers Annual #10	512	978-0785124993	2007-02-21
Nova	1	1976–1979	Nova #1-25; Marvel Two-in-One Annual #3; The Amazing Spider-Man #171	512	0-7851-2093-9	2006-03-29
Official Handbook of the Marvel Universe	1	1983–1984	Official Handbook of the Marvel Universe #1-15	544	0-7851-1933-7	2006-01-18
Official Handbook of the Marvel Universe Deluxe Edition	1	1985–1986	Official Handbook of the Marvel Universe Deluxe Edition #1-7	480	0-7851-1934-5	2006-03-15
Official Handbook of the Marvel Universe Deluxe Edition	2	1986–1987	Official Handbook of the Marvel Universe Deluxe Edition #8-14	480	0-7851-1935-3	2006-06-14
Official Handbook of the Marvel Universe Deluxe Edition	3	1987–1988	Official Handbook of the Marvel Universe Deluxe Edition #15-20	424	0-7851-1936-1	2006-07-19
Official Handbook of the Marvel Universe Update '89	1	1989	Official Handbook of the Marvel Universe Update '89 #1-8	496	0-7851-1937-X	2006-12-27
Official Handbook of the Marvel Universe Master Edition	1	1990–1993	"A-G" entries from Official Handbook of the Marvel Universe Master Edition #1-36	592	978-0785127307	2008-04-23
Official Handbook of the Marvel Universe Master Edition	2	1990–1993	"H-N" entries from Official Handbook of the Marvel Universe Master Edition #1-36	592	978-0785127314	2008-05-14
Official Handbook of the Marvel Universe Master Edition	3	1990–1993	"O-Z" entries from Official Handbook of the Marvel Universe Master Edition #1-36	576	978-0785127321	2008-10-15
Peter Parker, the Spectacular Spider-Man	1	1976–1979	Peter Parker, the Spectacular Spider-Man #1-31	568	0-7851-1682-6	2005-02-02
Peter Parker, the Spectacular Spider-Man	2	1979–1981	Peter Parker, the Spectacular Spider-Man #32-53, Annual #1-2; The Amazing Spider-Man Annual #13; The Fantastic Four #218	592	0-7851-2042-4	2006-02-15
Peter Parker, the Spectacular Spider-Man	3	1981–1983	Peter Parker, the Spectacular Spider-Man #54-74, Annual #3	536	978-0785125013	2007-03-14
Peter Parker, the Spectacular Spider-Man	4	1983–1985	Peter Parker, the Spectacular Spider-Man #75-96, Annual #4	576	978-0785130710	2009-08-26
Peter Parker, the Spectacular Spider-Man	5	1985–1986	Peter Parker, the Spectacular Spider-Man #97-114, Annual #5	576	978-0785157557	2011-07-12
Power Man and Iron Fist	1	1978–1980	Power Man and Iron Fist #50-72, 74-75	520	978-0785127260	2008-01-09
Power Man and Iron Fist	2	1980–1982	Power Man and Iron Fist #76-100; Daredevil #178	616	978-0785130727	2009-04-08
The Punisher	1	1974–1986	The Amazing Spider-Man #129, 134-135, 161-162, 174-175, 201-202; The Amazing Spider-Man Annual #15; Giant-Size Spider-Man #4; Marvel Preview #2; Marvel Super Action #1; Captain America #241; Daredevil #182-184; Peter Parker, the Spectacular Spider-Man #81-83; The Punisher #1-5	568	0-7851-2375-X	2004-03-01
The Punisher	2	1987–1989	The Punisher (vol. 2) #1-20, Annual #1; Daredevil #257	536	978-0785127345	2007-09-26
The Punisher	3	1989–1990	The Punisher (vol. 2) #21-40, Annual #2-3	584	978-0785130734	2009-02-04
The Punisher	4	1990–1992	The Punisher (vol. 2) #41-59, Annual #4-5	568	978-0785163510	2012-09-26
The Rampaging Hulk	1	1977–1978	The Rampaging Hulk #1-9; The Hulk! magazine #10-15	584	978-0785126997	2008-05-28
The Rampaging Hulk	2	1978–1981	The Hulk! magazine #16-27	544	978-0785142553	2010-03-31
Rawhide Kid	1	1960-1963	The Rawhide Kid #17-35	496	978-0785163947	2011-12-28
Savage She-Hulk	1	1979–1981	The Savage She-Hulk #1-25	552	0-7851-2335-0	2006-07-05
Sgt. Fury	1	1963-1965	Sgt. Fury and his Howling Commandos #1-23, Annual #1	544	978-0785163954	2011-11-23
Silver Surfer	1	1968–1970	Silver Surfer #1-18; The Fantastic Four Annual #5	528	0-7851-2008-4	1998-03-11
Silver Surfer	2	1982, 1987–1988	Silver Surfer (vol. 2) #1; Silver Surfer (vol. 3) #1-18, Annual #1; Marvel Fanfare #51	600	978-0785127000	2007-06-20
Spider-Woman	1	1977–1979	Marvel Spotlight #32; Marvel Two-in-One #29-33; Spider-Woman #1-25	576	0-7851-1793-8	2005-12-21
Spider-Woman	2	1980–1983	Spider-Woman #26-50; Marvel Team-Up #97; Uncanny X-Men #148	608	978-0785127017	2007-08-08
Sub-Mariner	1	1965–1968	Daredevil #7; Tales to Astonish #70-101; Tales of Suspense #80; Iron Man and the Sub-Mariner #1; The Sub-Mariner #1	504	978-0-7851-3075-8	2009-09-30
Super-Villain Team-Up	1	1970–1971, 1975–1980	Astonishing Tales #1-8; Giant-Size Super-Villain Team-Up #1-2; Super-Villain Team-Up #1-14, 15 (cover only) and 16-17; The Avengers #154-156; The Champions #16	552	0-7851-1545-5	2004-09-22
Tales of the Zombie	1	1973–1974	Tales of the Zombie #1-10; Dracula Lives! magazine #1-2	592	0-7851-1916-7	2006-10-04
Thor	1	1962–1964	Journey into Mystery #83-112	536	0-7851-1866-7	2001-02-28
Thor	2	1965–1966	Journey into Mystery #113-124; The Mighty Thor #125-136, Annual #1-2	584	0-7851-1591-9	2005-06-08
Thor	3	1967–1969	The Mighty Thor #137-166	616	0-7851-2149-8	2006-10-04
Thor	4	1969–1972	The Mighty Thor #167-195	600	0-7851-3076-4	2009-07-08
Thor	5	1972–1974	The Mighty Thor #196-220	528	0-7851-5093-5	2011-05-04
Thor	6	1974–1976	The Mighty Thor #221-247	520	978-0785163299	2012-10-11
Thor	7	1976–1978	Thor #248-271, Annual #5-6	504	978-0785166832	2013-10-29
The Tomb of Dracula	1	1972–1974	The Tomb of Dracula #1-25; Werewolf by Night #15; Giant-Size Chillers featuring The Curse of Dracula #1	560	0-7851-0920-X	2003-12-01
The Tomb of Dracula	2	1974–1976	The Tomb of Dracula #26-49; Doctor Strange #14; Giant-Size Dracula #2-5	592	0-7851-1461-0	2004-04-21
The Tomb of Dracula	3	1976–1979	The Tomb of Dracula #50-70; The Tomb of Dracula magazine #1-4	584	0-7851-1558-7	2004-11-03
The Tomb of Dracula	4	1973–1975, 1980	The Tomb of Dracula magazine #5-6; Dracula Lives! magazine #1-13; The Frankenstein Monster #7-9	576	0-7851-1709-1	2005-04-13
Warlock	1	1972-1977	Marvel Premiere #1-2, Warlock #1-15, The Incredible Hulk (vol. 2) #176-178, Strange Tales #178-181, Marvel Team-Up #55, The Avengers Annual #7, Marvel Two-in-One Annual #2	576	0-7851-6331-X	2012-08-15
Web of Spider-Man	1	1985-1986	Web of Spider-Man #1-18, Annual #1-2, The Amazing Spider-Man #268	528	0-7851-5756-5	2011-09-14
Web of Spider-Man	2	1986-1987	Web of Spider-Man #19-32, Annual #3, Peter Parker, the Spectacular Spider-Man #131-132, The Amazing Spider-Man #293-294	480	0-7851-6332-8	2012-07-11
Werewolf by Night	1	1972–1974	Marvel Spotlight #2-4; Werewolf by Night #1-21; Marvel Team-Up #12; Giant-Size Creatures #1; The Tomb of Dracula #18	576	0-7851-1839-X	2005-10-26
Werewolf by Night	2	1974–1976	Werewolf by Night #22-43; Giant-Size Werewolf #2-5; Marvel Premiere #28	576	978-0785127253	2007-11-14
Wolverine	1	1988–1990	Wolverine (vol. 2) #1-23	552	0-7851-1867-5	1996-10-23
Wolverine	2	1990–1991	Wolverine (vol. 2) #24-47	528	0-7851-0550-6	1997-03-19
Wolverine	3	1991–1993	Wolverine (vol. 2) #48-69	528	0-7851-0595-6	1998-06-17
Wolverine	4	1993–1995	Wolverine (vol. 2) #70-90	544	0-7851-2059-9	2006-05-03
Wolverine	5	1995–1997	Wolverine (vol. 2) #91-110, Annual 1996; Uncanny X-Men #332	562	978-0785130772	2009-01-07
Wolverine	6	1997–1998	Wolverine (vol. 2) #111-128, #-1, Annual 1997	512	978-0785163527	2012-12-06
Wolverine	7	1998–2000	Wolverine (vol. 2) #129-148, Hulk (vol. 3) #8	520	978-0785184089	2013-06-25
X-Factor	1	1986–1987	The Avengers #263; The Fantastic Four #286; X-Factor #1-16, Annual #1; The Mighty Thor #373-374; Power Pack #27	568	0-7851-1886-1	2005-11-30
X-Factor	2	1987–1988	X-Factor #17-35, Annual #2; The Mighty Thor #378	544	978-0785120995	2007-01-31
X-Factor	3	1988–1990	X-Factor #36-50, Annual #3; Uncanny X-Men #242-243	520	978-0785130789	2009-12-30
X-Factor	4	1990	X-Factor #51-59, Annual #4-5; X-Factor: Prisoner of Love; Marvel Fanfare #50; material from The Fantastic Four Annual #23, New Mutants Annual #6 and X-Men Annual #14	520	978-0785162858	2012-02-22
X-Factor	5	1990-1991	X-Factor #60-70, Annual #6; Uncanny X-Men #270-272, 280; material from Annual #15, New Mutants #95-97, material from Annual #7	528	978-0785163534	2012-12-26
X-Men	1	1975–1979	Giant-Size X-Men #1; X-Men #94-119	520	0-7851-2376-8	1996-10-09
X-Men	2	1979–1981	X-Men #120-144; Later editions add Annual #3-4	584	0-7851-2007-6	1997-10-15
X-Men	3	1981–1982	X-Men #145-161, Annual #3-5; Later editions switch Annual #3-4 for Annual #6 and The Avengers Annual #10	528	0-7851-0661-8	1998-08-05
X-Men	4	1982–1984	X-Men #162-179, Annual #6; Later editions switch Annual #6 for Annual #7 and Marvel Graphic Novel No. 5 - X-Men: God Loves, Man Kills	568	0-7851-2295-8	2001-06-01
X-Men	5	1984–1985	X-Men #180-198, Annual #7-8; Later editions switch Annual #7 for X-Men/Alpha Flight #1-2	632	0-7851-2692-9	2004-07-01
X-Men	6	1985–1987	X-Men #199-213, Annual #9; New Mutants #46, Special Edition #1; X-Factor #9-11; Thor #373-374; Power Pack #27	656	0-7851-1727-X	2005-09-14
X-Men	7	1987–1988	X-Men #214-228, Annual #10-11; X-Men vs. Fantastic Four #1-4	568	0-7851-2055-6	2006-04-19
X-Men	8	1988–1989	X-Men #229-243, Annual #12; X-Factor #36-39	544	978-0785127635	2007-12-12
X-Men	9	1989–1990	X-Men #244-264, Annual #13	544	978-0785130796	2009-06-03
X-Men	10	1990–1991	X-Men #265-272, Annual #14; material from The Fantastic Four Annual #23; New Mutants #95-97, material from Annual #6; X-Factor #60-62, material from Annual #5	512	978-0785163244	2012-03-28
X-Men	11	1991-1992	X-Men #273-280, Annual #15; X-Factor #69-70; X-Men (vol. 2) #1-3; material from: New Warriors Annual #1, X-Factor Annual #6 and New Mutants Annual #7	544	978-0785166849	2013-01-22

== See also ==
- List of comic books on CD/DVD
- Marvel Masterworks
- Marvel Ultimate Collection, Complete Epic and Epic Collection lines
- Marvel Omnibus
