= Khazar (disambiguation) =

The Khazars were a semi-nomadic people who created an empire between the late 7th and 10th centuries.

Khazar or Kazar may also refer to:

- Kazár, Hungarian village
- Nagykozár, Hungarian village
- Kozármisleny, Hungarian town
- Ka-Zar (disambiguation), Marvel Comics characters
- Ka-Zar (magazine), an earlier pulp magazine
- Khazar language, an extinct Turkic language
- Khazar University, in Baku
- Villages in Khuzestan Province, Iran
  - Khazar-e Do
  - Khazar-e Seh
  - Khazar-e Yek
- Xəzər, a village in Azerbaijan also romanized as Khazar

== See also ==
- Hazaras
