= Gil Cohen (artist) =

American illustrator and academic

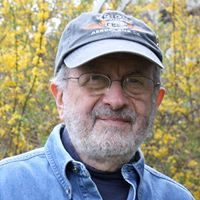
- Gil Cohen in 2009
- Born: Gilbert B. Cohen; July 28, 1931 (age 95); Philadelphia
- Education: Philadelphia Museum School of Art
- Known for: Aviation art

Gil Cohen (born July 28, 1931) is an American artist, noted for his illustrations of aircraft and people in military service, who also illustrated men's magazines, books and movie posters.

== Biography ==
Gilbert B. Cohen was born to Philip and Hannah (née Borofsky) Cohen on July 28, 1931, and raised in Philadelphia, where his Russian-immigrant grandparents and father operated a hardware store. He trained as an illustrator at the Philadelphia Museum School of Art, where he studied under artists Karl Sherman, Henry C. Pitz, Albert Gold, Joe Krush and S. Gertrude Schell, and then graduated in 1953. Soon thereafter, he was drafted into the U.S. Army and assigned to a military intelligence unit in Germany where he rendered images of Soviet weaponry, based on verbal espionage reports. Upon his release from the army, he resumed his chosen career in commercial art and illustration.

As of 2017, Cohen maintained a studio at his home in Doylestown, Pennsylvania.

== Career ==
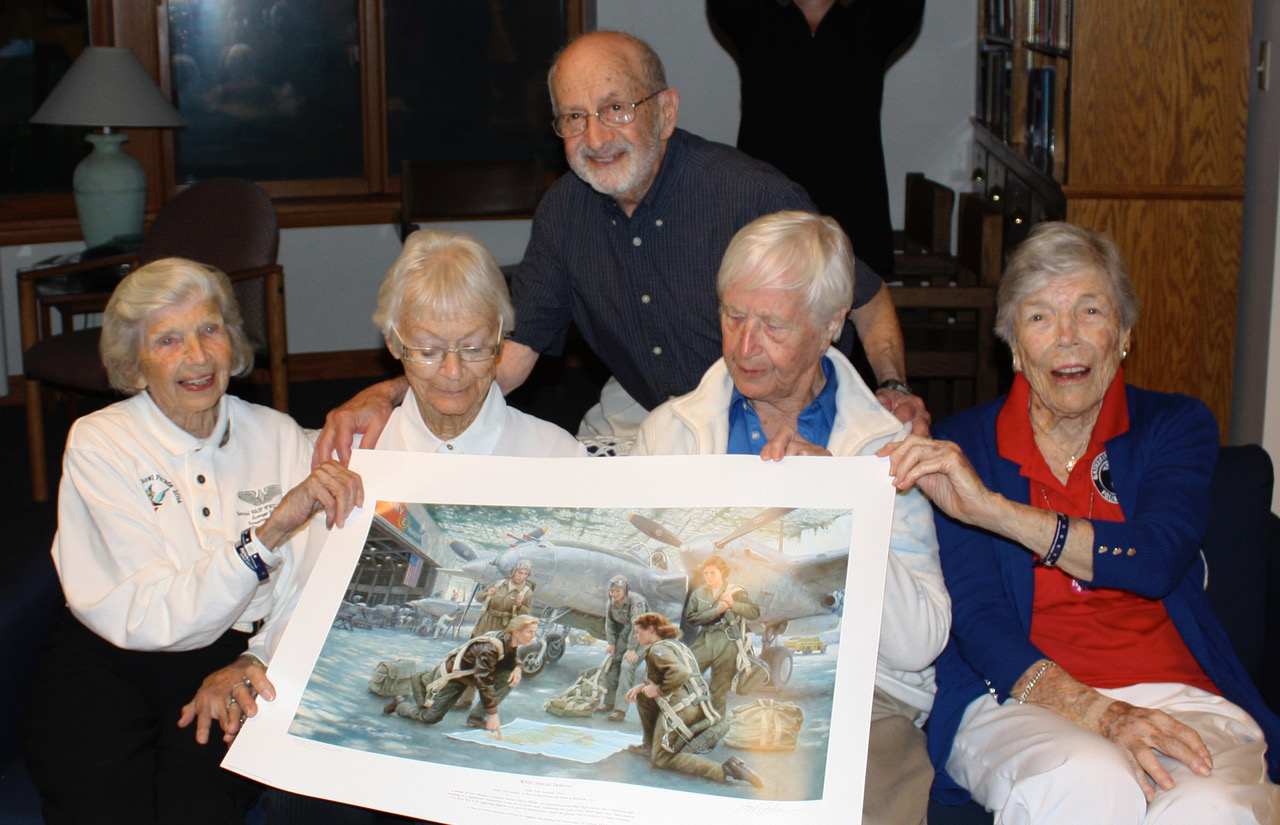
Cohen sharing painting of five Women's Airforce Service Pilots (WASPs) with four WASP alumnae.

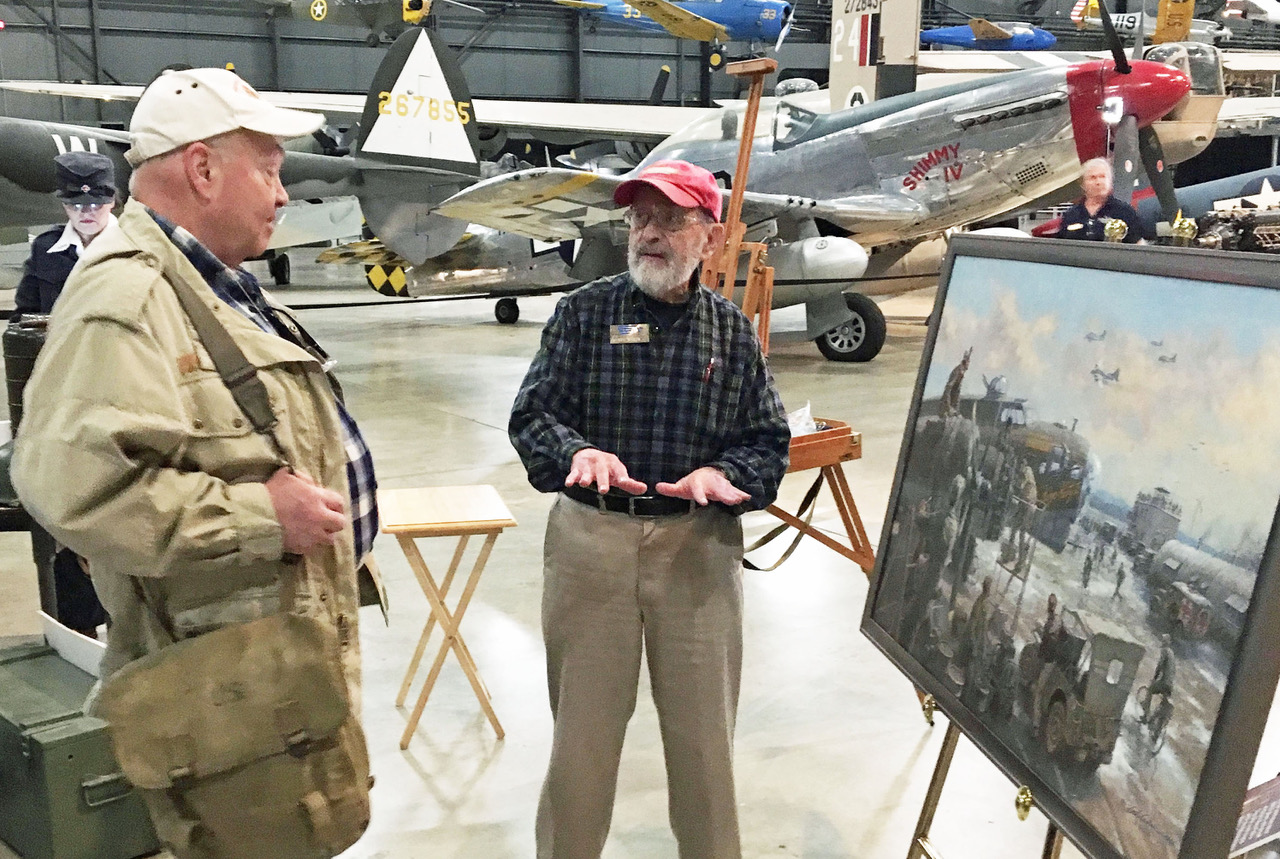
Cohen discussing his work at the National Museum of the United States Air Force.

Cohen's artistic career spanned more than six decades of producing images for men's magazines, movie posters, books, government agencies, and later producing carefully researched fine-art oil paintings of aviation and war-related subjects. He also assumed both teaching and administrative duties in his field of illustration. He is an Artist Fellow of the American Society of Aviation Artists.

=== Aviation art ===
Cohen’s interest in aviation began as a youth during the Second World War, when he became proficient in identifying a wide variety of aircraft of the time. This interest was renewed, when he became interested in producing World War II aviation art, which included a series of paintings depicting the activities of the Eighth Air Force—examples of which were exhibited in a one-man show at the National Museum of the Mighty Eighth Air Force in Pooler, Georgia, for six months, starting December 1988.

In 1997, he began publishing limited-edition prints of his aviation art, which were distributed through art-print vendors in the U.S. and Great Britain.

A retrospective of Cohen's aviation art was published in 2009. A reviewer of Cohen's body of work noted that it both presented faithful depictions of aircraft and, more significantly, focused on the people involved and the emotional energy that they brought to their activities.

He traveled under the auspices of the U.S. Air Force to theaters of conflict in Bosnia, Somalia, and Central Asia and also to Israel to create paintings that he donated to the U.S. Air Force Art Program.

=== Illustration art ===
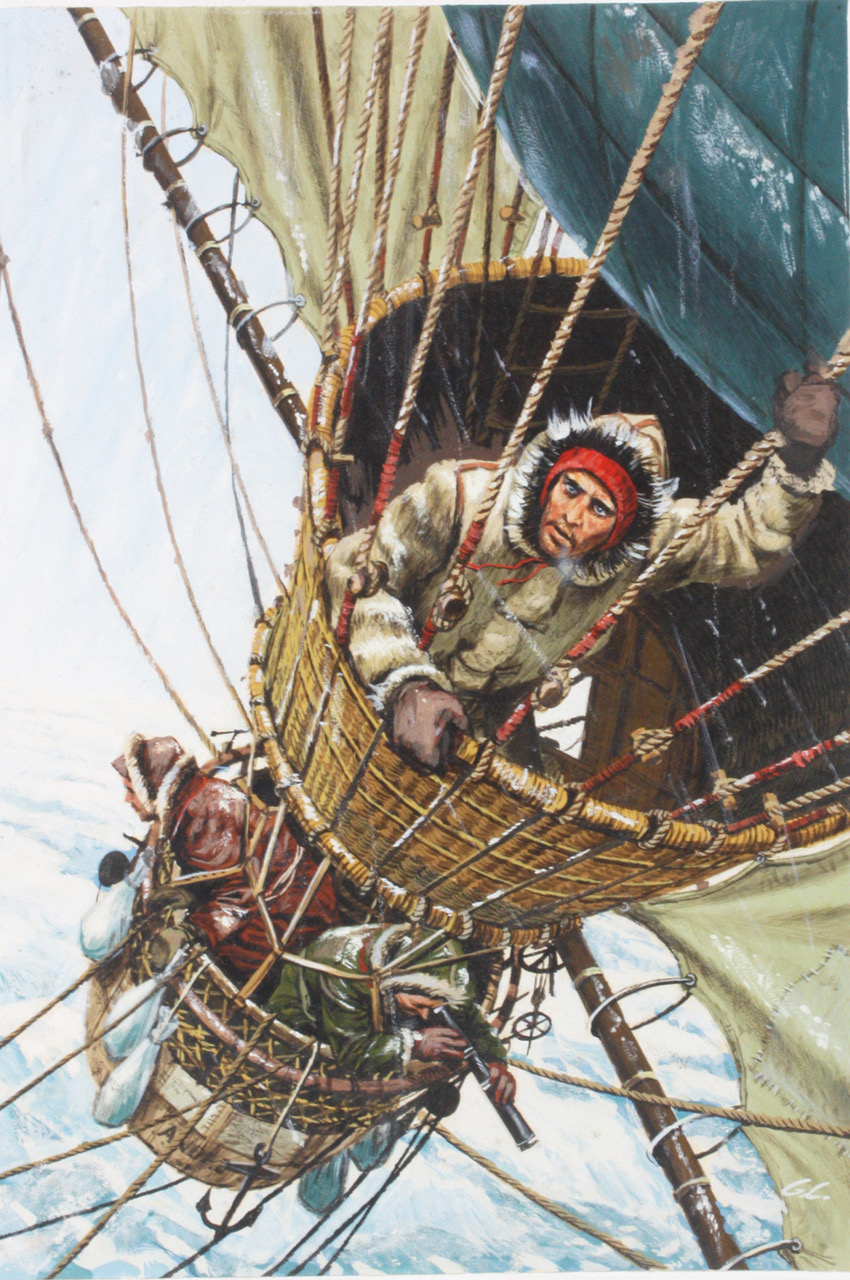
“The Great Balloon Race to the North Pole”, cover art for Man's World, January 1961

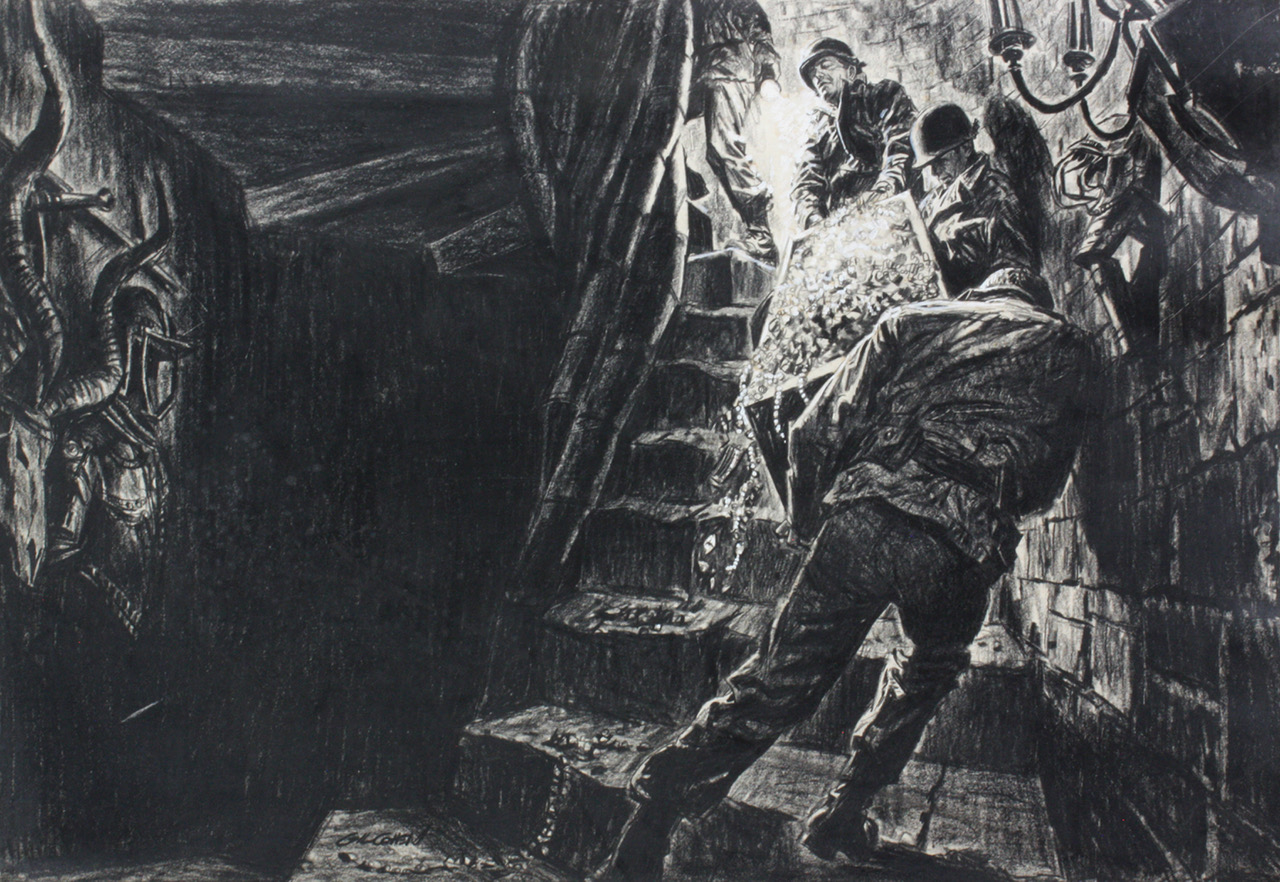
Duotone image of WWII soldiers retrieving a treasure for Argosy June, 1963: "The Greatest Souvenir"

During the 1950s and 60s, Cohen worked as a free-lance illustrator for men's adventure magazines—a common genre of the time. One such publisher was Magazine Management Company—with magazines that included Male, Stag, and For Men Only—whose assignments required complex illustrations, executed on a short deadline, often involving duotone technique (using black plus one other color on the printed page).

A 1961 assignment for Argosy magazine to illustrate a serialized version of Ian Fleming's James Bond novel, Thunderball, led to later assignments from another publisher to illustrate book covers for the Mack Bolan series of The Executioner novels by Don Pendleton.

His illustration work expanded to more mainstream clientele that included the U.S. Information Agency, the National Park Service, Paramount Pictures, Bantam Books, Harlequin Books, Random House, Holt Rinehart & Winston, Warner-Lambert, the U.S. Coast Guard, the National Guard Bureau, and the Boeing and Sikorsky Aircraft companies.

=== Teaching ===
In 1966, Cohen received an invitation to teach at his alma mater; (Note: The Philadelphia Museum School of Art became the Philadelphia College of Art in 1964 and then the University of the Arts in 1987.) this led to a part-time position as an instructor and to increasing academic responsibilities. He taught figure drawing, anatomy and illustration over the course of 21 years.

=== Other activities ===
Cohen has assumed administrative duties in the art world, as well. As part of the board of directors for the New York–based Society of Illustrators, he chaired its U.S. Air Force Art Program—providing travel opportunities for artists to depict the mission of the U.S. Air Force at bases around the world. In his work with the American Society of Aviation Artists (ASAA), he served variously as vice-president and exhibition committee chair; he received the ASAA Service Award for his work with the society.

== Recognition ==
Cohen's work was exhibited in venues that included:

- Society of Illustrators
- The National Parks Civil War battlefield sites of Appomattox Court House, Gettysburg, Mannasas, Chickamauga, and Petersburg
- Thaddeus Kosciuszko National Memorial
- Colorado Springs Fine Arts Center
- Royal Air Force Museum
- National Museum of the United States Air Force
- National Museum of the Mighty Eighth Air Force
- Imperial War Museum Duxford Flying Legends Air Show
- Bucks County Illustrators Society
- U.S. Coast Guard Art Program

He received recognition for his work that included:

- American Society of Aviation Artists: "Best of Show" (twice), “Award of Distinction” (four times)
- British Guild of Aviation Artists: “Best of Show” by an American artist
- Aviation Week & Space Technology magazine: “Best of the Best”, "Honorable Mention"
- Central Bucks County Chamber of Commerce: "Lifetime Achievement—Bucks County Arts" and "Lifetime Achievement Award in Art"

== Gallery of illustration art ==
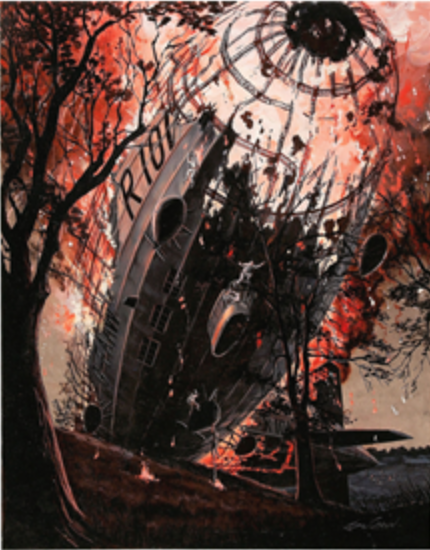
Duotone image of a burning Zeppelin for Stag magazine, January 1960

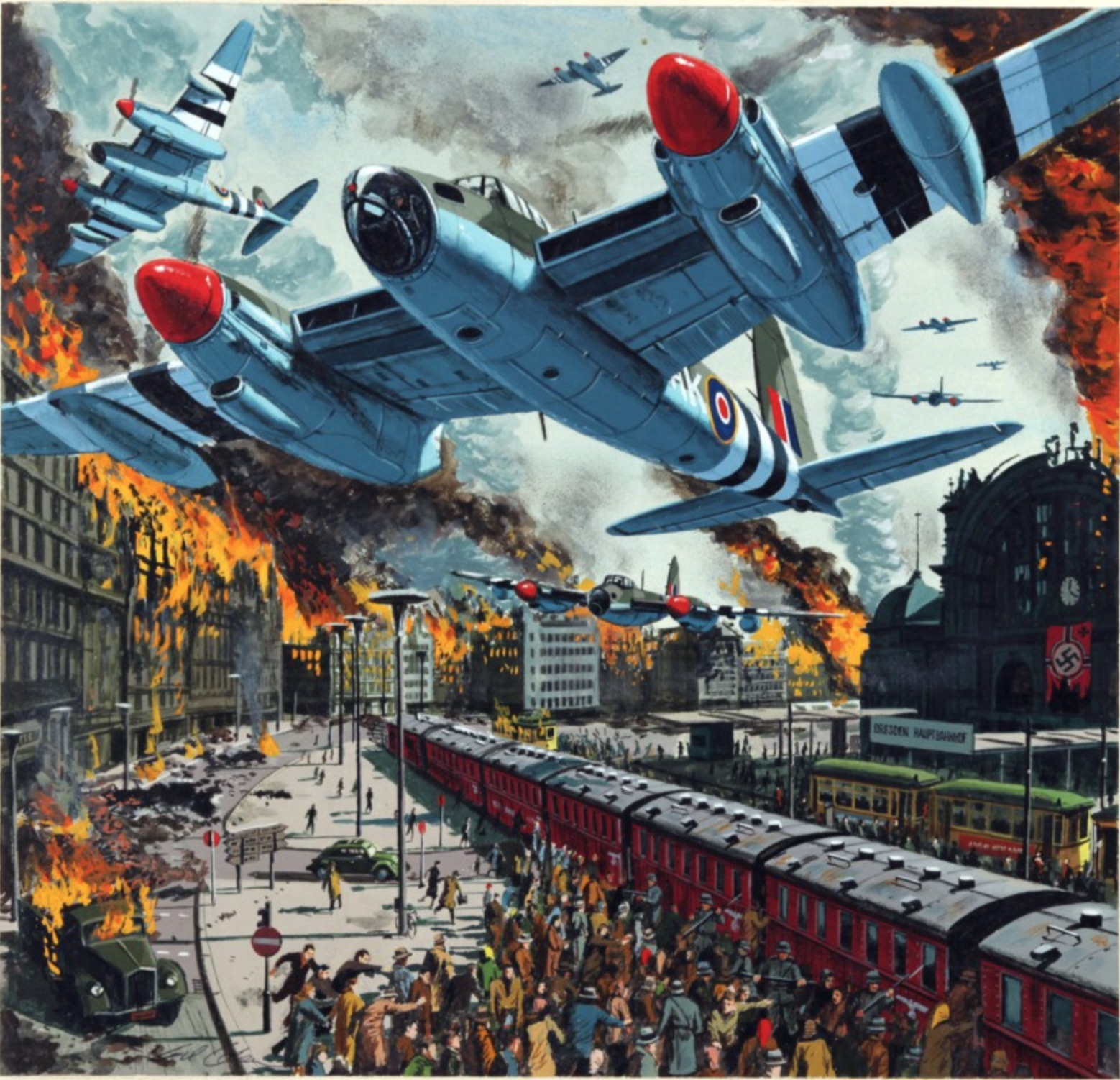
Cover art for Man's World, August 1961, depicting a de Havilland Mosquito raid

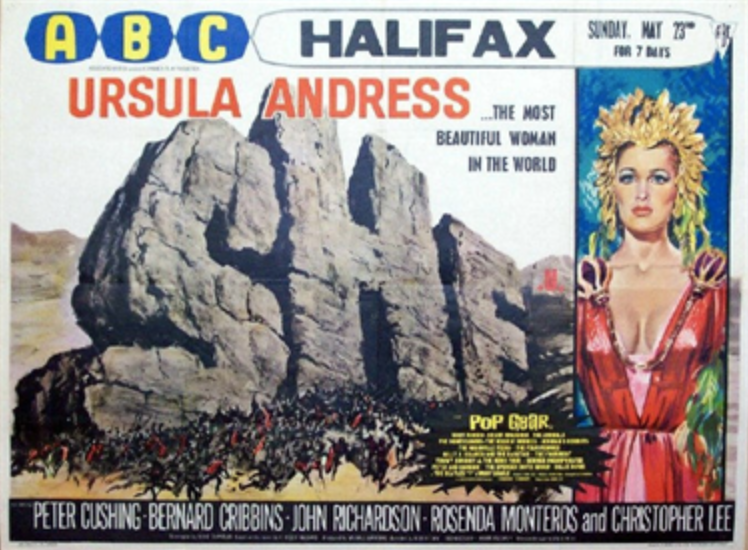
Movie poster for the 1965 movie, She, with painting by Cohen of a crowd scene on left side

== See also ==
Men's magazine artists

- James Bama
- Basil Gogos
- Bruce Minney

Aviation artists

- Rudolph Belarski
- Keith Ferris
- Anthony Saunders (artist)
- Craig Slaff
- Robert Taylor (British artist)
