= Khazar, Iran =

Khazar or Khezer (Persian: خزر), in Iran, may refer to:

- Khazar 1
- Khazar 2
- Khazar 3
