= Earl Norem =

American painter

Earl H. Norem
- Earl Norem
- Born: April 17, 1923/24 Brooklyn, New York
- Died: June 19, 2015 (aged 91-92) Danbury, Connecticut
- Area: Artist
- Pseudonym: Norem

Earl H. Norem (April 17, 1923/24 – June 19, 2015), who signed his work simply Norem, was an American artist primarily known for his painted covers for men's-adventure magazines published by Martin Goodman's Magazine Management Company and for Goodman's line of black-and-white comics magazines affiliated with his Marvel Comics division. Over his long career, Norem also illustrated covers for novels and gaming books, as well as movie posters, baseball programs, and trading cards.

== Early life ==
Norem was born on April 17, 1923 or 1924. He saw military action in World War II with the 85th Regiment of the 10th Mountain Division. He trained in Colorado and Texas, and fought the Germans in the Northern Apennine Mountains of Italy. By age 20, Norem was a squad leader and staff sergeant who in the Italian Campaign fought alongside famed skier Torger Tokle, whom he had seen ski jumping at Bear Mountain, New York, when Norem was 12. After Tokle was killed in action on March 3, 1945, Norem was one of the men assigned to retrieve his body from the mountain. Norem himself later was wounded going into the Po Valley, ending his military stint.

Upon returning to the US, Norem embarked on an illustration career.

== Career ==
Norem throughout the 1950s and 1960s worked extensively for men's adventure magazines, producing covers and interior-art spreads. In addition, he produced illustrations for such magazines such as Reader's Digest, Field and Stream, Ski, Real West, and Discover.

Norem's cover for The Silver Surfer (Fireside, 1978).

He worked on such Marvel Comics projects as Savage Sword of Conan, He-Man and the Masters of the Universe Magazine, Marvel Preview, Tales of the Zombie, Monsters Unleashed, Planet of the Apes, Rampaging Hulk, The Silver Surfer, and storybooks featuring Spider-Man and the Fantastic Four.

His Transformers work consisted of four Marvel Big Looker storybooks (published 1984–1986), some of which were later adapted into "read along" storybooks: Battle for Cybertron, The Great Car Rally, Car Show Blow Up, and The Story of Wheelie, The Wild Boy of Quintesson

Norem also provided art for several scary stories featured in Scholastic's Thrills & Chills magazine for young readers, which ran from 1994 to 1996.

=== Covers and trading cards ===
In addition to his work for Marvel, Norem painted illustrations and covers for the Worlds of Power, Wizards Warriors & You book series, Mars Attacks comics and trading cards, and Charlton Comics' The Six Million Dollar Man. The U.S. release of the Wizards Warriors & You series illustrated by Norem included covers in color.

In 2013, he had contributed paintings to the company's "Mars Attacks: Invasion" card set. At the time of his death, he was working on a trading card assignment for Topps' Mars Attacks franchise, presumably the "Mars Attacks" Occupation" set being produced in 2015.

=== Other work ===
Men (Oct. 1967) from Zenith Publishing / Magazine Management. Cover art by Norem, an example of his extensive work for men's adventure magazines.

Norem also painted movie posters for Conforte Graphics; package designs and artwork for Mego Toys, Mattel, and Hasbro; murals for the Military Museum of Southern New England, in Danbury, Connecticut; and two New York Yankees program covers.

== Personal life ==
Norem favored painting in acrylics. Suffering from arthritis, he had retired as of 2005, painting only for his own amusement and for his grandchildren. He said in a 2005 interview, "All the contacts that I had in the commercial art field are either retired or dead, and the younger art buyers don't want anything to do with an 81-year-old artist."

According to posts on Facebook accounts attributed to Norem family members, the artist died in Danbury, Connecticut on June 19, 2015, shortly after undergoing surgery. His family announced the news on Norem's Facebook fan page.
