= Curtis Circulation =

American book and magazine distributor

Curtis Circulation Company
- Type: Subsidiary
- Industry: Magazines
- Founded: 1946; 80 years ago
- Headquarters: New Milford, New Jersey, U.S.
- Area served: United States
- Key people: Joseph M. Walsh
- Services: Distribution; Retail marketing Publisher support services
- Parent: Curtis Publishing Company (1946–1969); Perfect Film & Chemical Corporation (1969–1973); Cadence Industries (1973–1986); Hachette Distribution Services (1986–2019); Comag Marketing Group (2019–present)
- Website: www.curtiscirc.com

Curtis Circulation Company, LLC (abbreviated as CC) is a magazine distribution company. Established as the circulation department of the Curtis Publishing Company, it became a subsidiary in 1946 and distributed publications including The Atlantic, Esquire, Classics Illustrated, and Marvel Comics. The company was acquired by Comag Marketing Group in 2019.

== History ==
Curtis Circulation Company began as the circulation department of the Philadelphia-based Curtis Publishing Company, publisher of The Saturday Evening Post, Ladies' Home Journal, and Holiday. Curtis Circulation became a subsidiary in 1946.

Besides the publishing company's own magazines, other titles distributed by Curtis Circulation included The Atlantic and Esquire. Curtis began distributing Classics Illustrated in Canada in 1948 and in the United States of 1951.

In 1969, Perfect Film & Chemical Corporation, later Cadence Industries, purchased Curtis Circulation from the Curtis Publishing Company. Beginning in 1969 (and lasting until 1995), Curtis became the distributor of Marvel Comics (Perfect Film had bought out publisher Martin Goodman—owner of Magazine Management Company, the parent of Marvel Comics, in 1968).

Joseph M. Walsh became president of Curtis Circulation in 1970 and later held executive positions at parent company Cadence Industries.

In 1973, Perfect Film renamed itself Cadence Industries. In 1978, Curtis Circulation was the U.S.'s largest magazine distributor.

In 1982, Joseph M. Walsh became chairman and CEO of Curtis, acquiring an ownership stake.

Cadence Industries was liquidated in 1986, selling Curtis Circulation to Hachette Distribution Services (a division of the Lagardère Group); Walsh retained his ownership stake.

Comag Marketing Group (CMG) acquired Curtis Circulation Company, effective October 1, 2019

== See also ==
- Curtis Magazines
