= Martin S. Ackerman =

American lawyer and businessman (1932-1993)

- Born: 1932
- Died: August 1, 1993 (aged 61); Mount Sinai Hospital, Manhattan, New York, US
- Education: Syracuse University; Rutgers Law School
- Occupations: Lawyer and businessman
- Spouses: Frances Shapiro; Diane Leighton
- Children: 4

Martin S. Ackerman (1932 – August 1, 1993) was a lawyer and businessman known for mergers and acquisitions.

== Biography ==
In 1932, Martin S. Ackerman was born to Rebecca Ackerman. He has two siblings, Ruby Ackerman Levy and Leonard Ackerman.

=== Legal career ===
Raised in Rochester, New York, Ackerman then attended and graduated from Syracuse University. He then studied law at Rutgers Law School. In 1957, became a partner in the Cooper, Ostrin, De Varco & Ackerman law firm based in New York City. They were mergers and acquisitions specialists.

=== Business career ===
Perfect Film and Chemical Corporation was formed in 1962 by Ackerman from parts of his first four acquisitions: United Whelan Corporation, Hudson National, Perfect Photos, and Equality Plastics Inc. Hudson was a mail-order firm and Equality Plastics Inc. was a consumer products distributor. Perfect Film sold off Whelan drugstores and the Pathe Films Lab.

In 1968, Ackerman's Perfect Film loaned $5 million into Curtis Publishing Company at the request of Curtis' primary loan holder, First National Bank of Boston, to extend its loans. He was appointed president of Curtis. Ackerman had Curtis sell for $7.3 million its Philadelphia headquarters to a real estate developer, John W. Merriam, and lease half the buildings back to pay off most of the First National loan. In 1968, Curtis Publishing sold the Ladies' Home Journal, along with The American Home, to Downe Communications for $5.4 million in stock. Ackerman had Curtis sell the Downe stock for operating cash. 6 million Post subscribers were sold to Life for cash, a 2.5 million dollar loan and became a customer of Curtis' subsidiaries for circulation and printing services. With all these attempts to revive the Post and lack of a purchaser, Curtis Publishing shut down the Evening Post in 1969. A Curtis founder's descendant, stockholders and trustees sued Ackerman over his actions at Curtis. The union sued over an alleged diversion of $6 million in pension fund diversion to invest in Lin Broadcasting. For five weeks, he was president of Lin. In 1969, Ackerman left Curtis and Perfect Film.

By the mid-1970s, Ackerman moved to London. There he practiced tax law, was publishing Arts Review magazine and established Eaton House Publishers.

In a dispute over support, his ex-wife went to England, then back, finally winning in a 1982 federal court ruling.

Ackerman also dabbled in banking by helping form Republic National Bank on Fifth Avenue, and owned, for a time, a Californian bank.

At the time of his death, Martin served on the boards of Zales, Non-Invasive Monitoring Systems, Adience and Calton Home Builders. On June 14, 1993, Ackerman was named chairman, president and chief executive officer of Standard Brands Paint Co. as part of the plan that brought the company out of Chapter 11 federal bankruptcy protection.

== Personal life and death ==
Ackerman married twice. His first wife was Frances Shapiro. They divorced and he remarried to Diane Leighton. Ackerman died at the age of 61 on August 1, 1993, at Mount Sinai Hospital, Manhattan, from acute sepsis, after an operation. He was survived by his wife, his son, Richard Ackerman, and his three daughters, Kelly L. Ackerman, Debra Ackerman, and Victoria Ackerman Richardson.

== Books ==
Ackerman wrote many books, including:

- The Curtis Affair (Nash, 1970)
- With Diane Leighton, Money, Power, Ego: A Manual for Would-be Wheeler-Dealers (Playboy, 1976)

== Philanthropy ==
Ackerman established a foundation to donate art worth millions of dollars.
