= Anthony Saunders =

Anthony Saunders may refer to:

- Anthony Saunders (economist) (fl. 1970s–2020s), American academic
- Anthony Saunders (artist) (born 1964), British artist
- Tony Saunders (born 1974), American baseball pitcher
- Tony Saunders (bassist) (born 1955), American bass player
