= United Cigar Stores =

Chain of cigar stores

- Company type: Public
- Industry: Tobacco retail, specialty retail
- Founded: 1901
- Founders: Charles A. Whelan; George J. Whelan
- Defunct: 1962
- Fate: Bankruptcy (1932); merged into successor corporations
- Headquarters: Syracuse, New York, United States
- Area served: United States

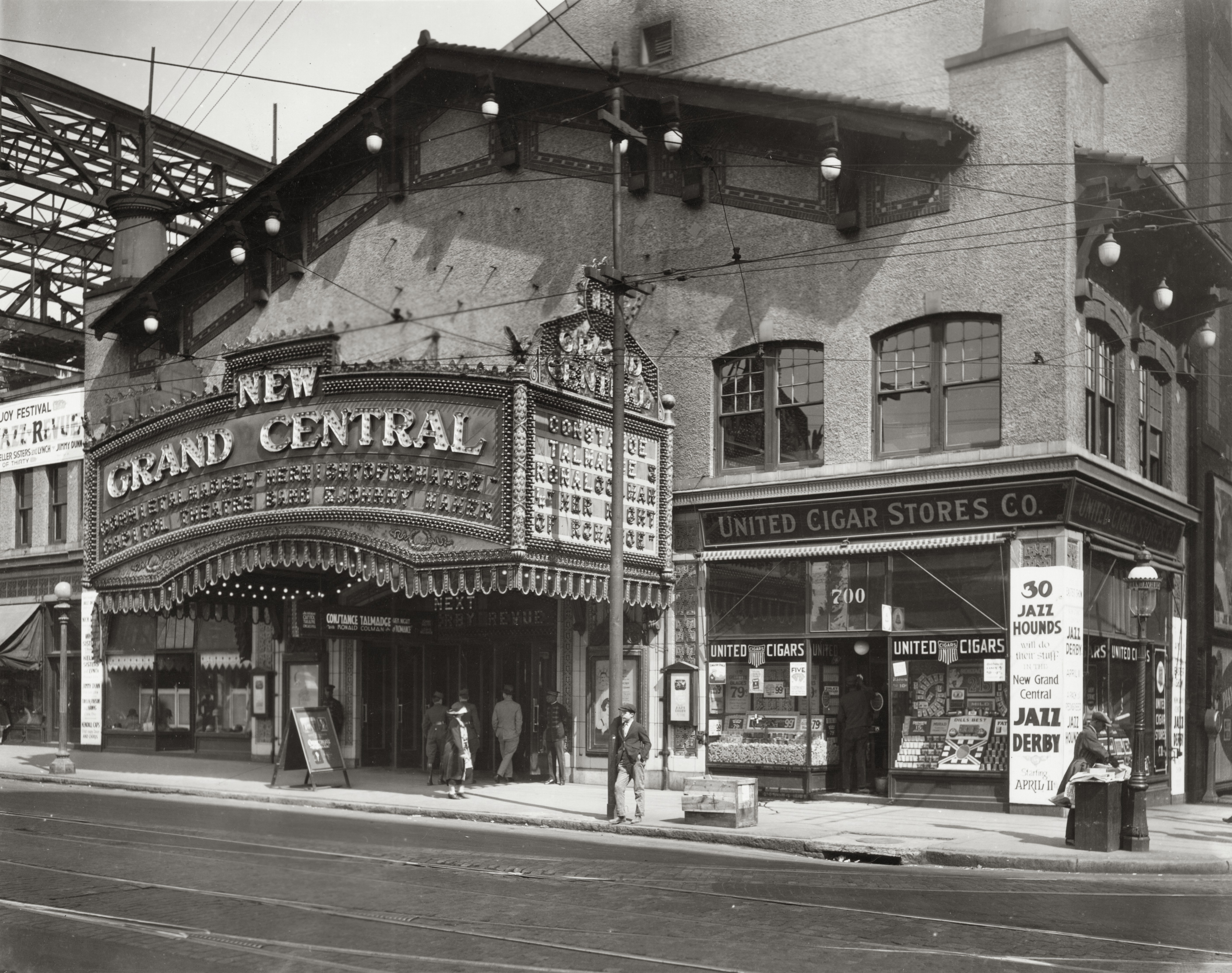
St. Louis, Missouri, 1925 (on corner)

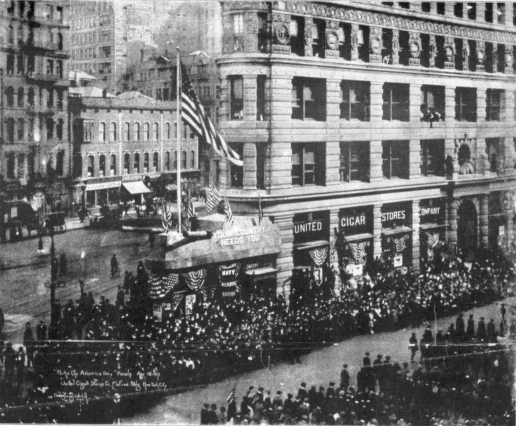
On April 19, 1917, the cowcatcher of the Flatiron Building United Cigar Store was transformed into a mock fort for the "Wake up America Day" parade.

United Cigar Stores was a chain of cigar stores in the United States that in its first quarter-century grew to nearly 3,000 shops. It eventually became part of the corporation that bought Marvel Comics and its parent company Magazine Management from their founder in 1968.

== History ==
Brothers Charles A. Whelan and George J. Whelan founded a tobacco wholesale firm in Syracuse, New York, in 1901, eventually turning to retail. By 1926, the chain had nearly 3,000 stores. Though initially specializing in cigars, it eventually sold many other items, such as Mickey Mouse watches and shoe trees. The chain represented the interests of the Consolidated Tobacco Company, the tobacco trust that controlled the American Tobacco Company and others. In September 1903 a settlement was reached with the chain's competitors and all competition ended.

In August 1929, the chain and the affiliated Whelan Drug chain, founded by two of Charles' Whelan's sons, was sold to brothers George Kenan and Frederick Kenan Morrow. The company also was involved in real estate. As the Great Depression deepened, the real-estate subsidiary accumulated huge losses, so in September 1932 the holding company declared bankruptcy. Before its bankruptcy, it had 975 cigar stores and 219 drug stores, but most of its assets were in real estate. The chain recovered and had 1300 outlets in 1951.

== Corporate progression ==
United Cigar Stores became part of United Cigar-Whelan Stores Corp., then United Whelan Corp. In 1962, it and three other companies merged to form Perfect Film & Chemical Corp., a film-processing and mail-order seller of drugs and vitamins. In 1968, it bought out publisher Martin Goodman, founder and owner of Magazine Management Company, the parent of Marvel Comics and other ventures. The Company renamed itself Cadence Industries Corporation in 1970, and was liquidated in 1986, selling its Marvel Entertainment Group to New World Pictures.
