= Ka-Zar =

Ka-Zar may refer to:

- Ka-Zar (David Rand), a Tarzan-type character named David Rand, who first appeared in the pulp magazine Ka-Zar #1
- Ka-Zar (Kevin Plunder), the Jack Kirby and Stan Lee creation, who first appeared in The X-Men #10
- Ka-Zar (magazine), a pulp magazine featuring the David Rand character
