= Bruce Minney =

American artist (1928–2013)

Bruce Minney (October 2, 1928 — August 5, 2013) was an American artist who worked in a variety of media. He was a commercial illustrator for over 40 years producing paintings for men’s adventure magazines, paperbacks, and storyboards.

== Biography ==
Minney graduated from Oakland High in 1946, he attended the California School of Arts and Crafts. After graduation, he married his high school sweetheart, Doris Schulz, and worked as a fireman in nearby Orinda as he tried to launch his art career. In 1955, he moved to New York City. Doris got a job in advertising with Doyle, Dane, Bernbach, while Minney stayed home with his daughter and created samples. Eventually, he met Eddie Balcourt, an artist's representative, and began his career as a professional illustrator.

Illustration by Bruce Minney for Man's World, April 1967

Minney did many credited and uncredited illustrations for Stag, For Men Only, Male, True Action, Man’s World and many other publications of Magazine Management. He also did all the interior illustrations for the short-lived Space Science Fiction Magazine. During the 1960s, readership of the men’s adventure magazines dropped and jobs were harder to come by. One of the last men’s adventure magazine illustration Minney did was for National Lampoon in November 1970.

From 1969 to 1986, Minney created over 400 paperback illustrations in oils and acrylic for Grosset & Dunlap, Avon, Fawcett, Harlequin, Ace, Pinnacle, Manor Books, and Pyramid. Among the titles he illustrated were: the Lone Ranger series Horatio Hornblower series, and Windhaven series.

Minney was the featured artist in Illustration magazine #40. His work was also featured in the Season 9 episode "Going Hollywood" of the History Channel series American Pickers, which aired on August 5, 2013.

In the 1990s and into the 2000s, Minney worked in ceramics and exhibited his works at many arts and crafts shows in California and Florida.
