= Brain Wave =

1953 novel by Poul Anderson

- First edition
- Author: Poul Anderson
- Cover artist: Richard Powers
- Language: English
- Subject: Intelligence
- Genre: science fiction
- Publisher: Ballantine
- Publication date: 1954
- Publication place: United States
- Media type: Print (Paperback, Hardcover)
- Pages: 164
- OCLC: 2886722
- LC Class: 54-8910

Brain Wave is a science fiction novel by American writer Poul Anderson, first published in serial form in Space Science Fiction in 1953, and then as a novel in 1954. Anderson had said that he could consider it one of his top five books. This is one of many science fiction works written at this time on the theme of heightened intelligence.

== Plot summary ==
At the end of the Cretaceous period, Earth moved into an energy-dampening field in space. While Earth was in this field, all conductors became more insulating, dramatically lowering the intelligence of all animal life by inhibiting the function of neurons. As a result, almost all of the life on Earth with neurons died off, causing the Cretaceous–Paleogene extinction event. The ones that survived passed on their genes for sufficiently capable neurons to deal with the new circumstance. Now in modern times, Earth suddenly moves out of the field. Within weeks all animal life on Earth becomes about 5 times as intelligent. The novel goes through the triumphs and tribulations of various people and non-human animals on Earth after this event.

The book opens with a lyrical description of a rabbit, stuck inside a trap, becoming able to reason his way out. This is a common theme in the book. Traps, cages, and fences are based on the inability of animals to reason their way out of them. When the animals gain the ability to reason, they start escaping.

Institutions which seemed to be vital to human society, such as a money economy and centralized government, disappear in North America. Africans, with the assistance of intelligent apes, overcome colonial rule, while Chinese and Russians rebel against their Communist governments. However, some of the means by which people cope with the "Change" are by inventing new anti-scientific religions such as the Third Ba'al, or adopting pseudo-science.

As humans develop interstellar travel, they discover no other races are as intelligent as they; other races evolved brains while outside the dampening field. With no environmental pressure to select for higher intelligence, the average IQ of other races is roughly equivalent to that of pre-Change humanity.

Eventually "normal" humanity evolves to the point where they can exert considerable mental control over their intellectual and physical processes. After preventing an attempt by a group of insane scientists to artificially re-create the dampening field around the Earth, humanity resolves to leave the planet in the charge of the intelligent animals and mentally-impaired humans. In turn, the human race will become an unseen helping hand to the multitude of other races throughout the universe.

== Characters ==
=== Archie Brock ===
Archie Brock, one of the main characters in the story, is mentally disabled; when the Earth moves out of the field he becomes a genius by pre-Change standards. His character is central to the story. Halfway through the book he has taken over the farm that he worked on and, with the aid of his dog (who now understands simple English) and some escaped circus animals (two chimps and an elephant), they successfully run the farm together. Even though his intelligence has increased fivefold, so has everyone else's. He is still considered a relative simpleton, but has very much come to terms with that. In the end, when nearly all the humans leave Earth, he decides to stay behind as leader of a colony of now sentient animals and formerly mentally disabled people.

=== Dr. Peter Corinth ===
Physics researcher who spent a brief period at Los Alamos in WWII. He is one of the first to understand the change. After the change he experiences an emotional battle to stay loyal to his wife, although he has feelings for another woman in his office. He later becomes a pilot of the first spaceship able to explore the galaxy. As part of that exploration, he again crosses into the energy-dampening field. His mind quickly becomes unable to work the complex controls, and he must wait for the ship to move back out of the field on its own. His delay in returning home results in his wife artificially lowering her own intelligence by “frying” parts of her brain.

=== Sheila Corinth ===
Wife of Peter Corinth. She is a housewife before the change. The first effect she goes through when the change begins is a philosophical realization that her life as a housewife is "better" than that of her non-conformist friends. Later on she begins to lose her sanity from having to deal daily with the existential crisis. Her story is typical of many people in the book who lacked the intelligence before the change to know how bad their situations were. Later she goes into her husband's lab to use an electroconvulsive therapy machine that severely damages her brain, bringing her IQ down to about 150, with which she is more comfortable. Her memories of Peter are erased, and in the last scene we see her introduced to Archie Brock's farm.

=== Felix Mandelbaum ===
Neighbor of the Corinths. Before the change he is a Jewish executive secretary of a local union. He is 50 years old and was born on the lower East Side of New York. Later on he becomes "executive of the world", and is instrumental in stopping the plot to return the Earth to pre-Change intelligence.

== Reception ==
Some have argued that the book is too short, possibly a result of editorial requirements at the time. For example, Thomas M. Wagner writes, "The book does feel somewhat rushed, as well as heavily edited, and I felt there was more Anderson was wanting to tell me. Anderson focuses his plot on a handful of lead characters."

Reviewer Groff Conklin praised the novel as an "original idea . . . brilliantly carried out" but faulted its "rather fumbling ending". P. Schuyler Miller described Brain Wave as "a brilliant idea that somehow doesn't quite come off". Anthony Boucher praised the novel, saying that "Anderson has worked out in wonderfully logical detail the logical consequences of [his] assumption [and] advanced his speculations with exciting storytelling and moving characterization." Leslie Flood wrote in New Worlds that "Brain Wave is a convincing, humanly realistic example of the wonders of the science fiction novel at its literary and thought-provoking best."
