= Space Science Fiction Magazine =

American science fiction magazine

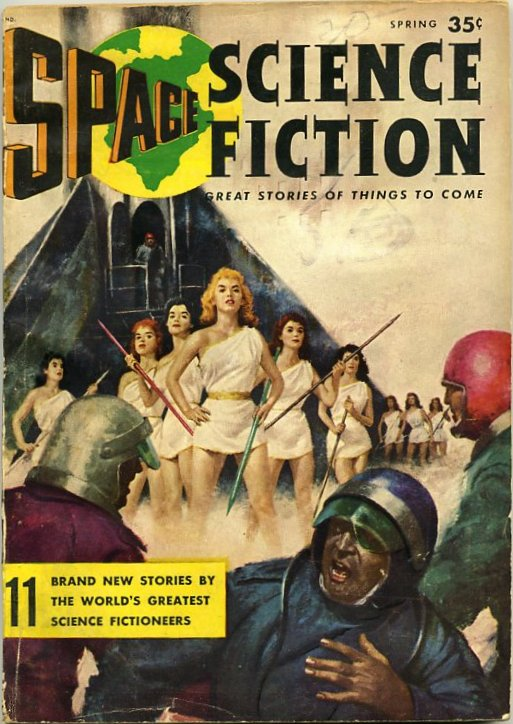
The Spring 1957 issue of Space Science Fiction Magazine; the first of the two issues that appeared. The cover illustrates Milton Lesser's "The New World to Conquer", in which spacemen come upon a planet of women who think of men as drones.

Space Science Fiction Magazine was a US science fiction magazine published by Republic Features Syndicate, Inc. as part of a package of radio shows and related genre magazines. It was edited by Michael Avallone, though the masthead listed Lyle Kenyon Engel as editor instead. Two issues appeared, both in 1957. It published short stories by well-known writers, including Arthur C. Clarke and Jack Vance, but it was not successful, and the magazine ceased publication late in 1957.

== Publication history and bibliographic data ==
Science fiction was one of the staple genres of American pulp magazine publishing, beginning in 1926 with Amazing Stories. A brief boom in the late 1930s was cut short by World War II, but the field expanded again in the late 1940s. By 1957 the boom had reached its height; 24 science fiction magazines published at least one issue that year. One of the most prominent of these magazines, Galaxy Science Fiction, had a successful association with two radio shows, Dimension X and X Minus One. This sparked imitators, and during 1956 Lyle Kenyon Engel of Republic Features Syndicate persuaded an investor to finance a package of two radio shows and four magazines. The shows were American Agent, a spy drama, and The Frightened, to be narrated by Boris Karloff. The magazine package included a spy magazine and a horror magazine to tie in with the radio shows, and two additional titles: Private Investigator Detective Magazine and Space Science Fiction Magazine. Private Investigator's first issue was published in 1956, but problems with the radio schedules delayed the launch of the other magazines until 1957.

Space SF's first issue was dated Spring 1957, although its masthead indicated that it would be a bimonthly. It was published by Republic Features Syndicate, Inc., of New York, and edited by Michael Avallone, who was not credited on the masthead, since he was also contributing material to some of the four magazines, both under his own name and under pseudonyms. The second issue was dated August 1957; this proved to be the final issue, as shortly thereafter Republic Features Syndicate went out of business. The liquidation of American News Company earlier that year, a major distributor, had led to the extinction of many magazines, as they had to scramble to find new distributors, but it is not known if Space SF was one of the victims.

Both issues were digest-sized, with 132 pages, and were priced at 35 cents. The issues were numbered as a single volume with two issues.

== Contents ==
Engel obtained stories from moderately well-known science fiction names for both issues, including John Jakes, Mack Reynolds, Jack Vance, and Raymond F. Jones, but many of the stories were "barrel-scrapings" from the Scott Meredith Literary Agency, in the words of one historian; most had already been rejected at the other active science fiction markets. Space SF also published Arthur C. Clarke's "Critical Mass", one of the popular "White Hart" stories. It had already appeared in a 1949 edition of a British magazine, Lilliput, but Clarke revised it for this publication. Overall, in the words of Mike Ashley, "... [it] carried stories by noted sf writers, [but] they read like rejects from better magazines, and there was nothing of lasting value". Ashley comments that the best story was Jakes's "The Devil Spins a Sun-Dream", which was atmospheric if poorly plotted; the protagonist, a human prospector on Mars, finds a fabulous city, but an ancient booby-trap destroys it before his eyes.

Almost every story was illustrated, with Bruce Minney as artist. Both issues' covers were by Tom Ryan. There were no editorials, review columns, or any other contents other than fiction, and advertisements, all of which were for radio shows, including American Agent and The Frightened.

== Sources ==
- Ashley, Michael (1978). The History of the Science Fiction Magazine. Part 4: 1956–1965. London: New English Library. ISBN 978-0-450-03438-1.
- Ashley, Mike (2005). Transformations: The Story of the Science Fiction Magazines from 1950 to 1970. Liverpool: Liverpool University Press. ISBN 978-0-85323-769-3.
- Avallone, Michael (1983). "American Agent". In Cook, Michael L. (ed.). Mystery, Detective, and Espionage Magazines. Westport, Connecticut: Greenwood Press. pp. 26–27. ISBN 0-313-23310-1.
- Edwards, Malcolm; Nicholls, Peter (1993). "SF Magazines". In Clute, John; Nicholls, Peter (eds.). The Encyclopedia of Science Fiction. New York: St. Martin's. pp. 1066–1071. ISBN 978-0-312-09618-2.
- Nicholls, Peter; Clute, John (1993). "Genre SF". In Clute, John; Nicholls, Peter (eds.). The Encyclopedia of Science Fiction. New York: St. Martin's. p. 483. ISBN 978-0-312-09618-2.
- Tuck, Donald H. (1982). The Encyclopedia of Science Fiction and Fantasy. Volume 3: Miscellaneous. Chicago: Advent. ISBN 978-0-911682-26-7.
