= For Men Only (magazine) =

American men's magazine

- Cover of the October 1966 issue
- Former editors: Noah Sarlat (1950s)
- Categories: Men's adventure (1950s–1960s); Pornographic men's (1970s)
- Frequency: Monthly
- Publisher: Canam Publishers Sales Corp. (1954—c. 1957); Newsstand Publications Inc. (c. 1956–1967); Perfect Film Inc. (c. 1968–1970); Magazine Management Co. Inc. (from 1970)
- First issue: 1954; 72 years ago
- Final issue: late 1970s
- Country: United Kingdom

For Men Only was a men's magazine published from 1954 to the late 1970s. It began as a men's adventure digest-sized magazine, but became a pornographic magazine in the 1970s. It was published by the New York-based company Magazine Management (under various other names), which later became known as Marvel Entertainment. Magazine Management published similar magazines like Stag and Male.

== Writers ==
Because it employed young writers in New York City, many of its former staff and contributors — such as Martin Cruz Smith and Donald Bain — became well-known later in their lives. All of them wrote under pseudonyms while writing or editing For Men Only.

Donald Bain wrote for the magazine in the early 1960s at a time when other writers contributing to the cluster of men's magazines included Mario Puzo, Mickey Spillane and Bruce Jay Friedman. Bain described writing for the magazine as a sought-after job for writers at the time because "the money was good and the writing was easy". He said that while the stories were usually billed as being true, it was common practice for writers to completely make them up, including quotes from fictitious experts. Likewise, many of the stories billed as excerpts from upcoming novels were actually just double-length articles written specifically for the magazine.

Novelist Martin Cruz Smith described writing for the magazine in the 1960s when a team of two editors — junior and senior — created the entire magazine each month. At the time the magazine featured a photo spread and centerfold but the female model was not nude. Cruz worked at the magazine from the mid-1960s to 1968.
