= Ka-Zar (David Rand) =

Pulp magazine and comics character

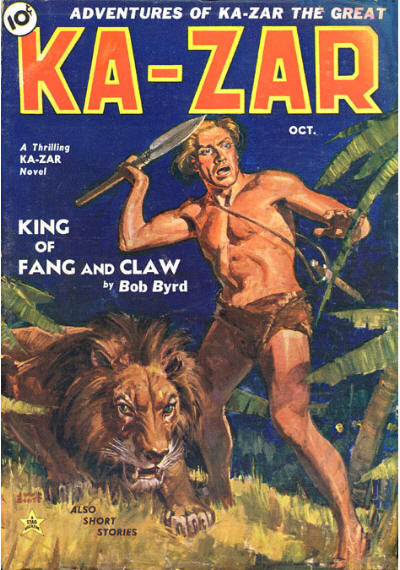
- David Rand, the original Ka-Zar, alongside his lion Zar in the cover of Ka-Zar #1 (October 1936); Art by J. W. Scott

Publication information
- Publisher: Manvis Publishing; Timely Comics (now Marvel Comics)
- First appearance: Ka-Zar #1 (October 1936); Marvel Comics #1 (October 1939)
- Created by: Bob Byrd

In-story information
- Alter ego: David Rand
- Abilities: Peak physical strength, speed, agility, and reflexes Ability to communicate with some animals

David Rand is a fictional character appearing in American comic books published by Marvel Comics.

The first character to bear the Ka-Zar name, he was created by writer Bob Byrd, and first appeared in the pulp magazine Ka-Zar #1 (October 1936).

== Publication history ==
The first Ka-Zar, David Rand, was a typical "jungle lord" in the Tarzan vein, also known as Ka-Zar the Great, who first appeared in the pulp magazine Ka-Zar #1 (October 1936) from Manvis Publishing, one of many magazine companies owned by Martin Goodman.

The story was continued in two further issues published in January and June 1937, and then the character was set aside.

Writer-artist Ben Thompson adapted the pulp story "King of Fang and Claw" by Bob Byrd for Goodman's first comic book, Marvel Comics. This story was serialised in comic form in Marvel Comics #1 (October 1939) and Marvel Mystery Comics #2–5 (December 1939 to March 1940). Ray Gill and Bob Oskner did stories and artwork. Ka-Zar also appeared in Human Torch #5 (Fall 1941). Ka-Zar was featured in new stories until Marvel Mystery Comics #27 (January 1942).

In 2006, the David Rand Ka-Zar was featured in the All-New Official Handbook to the Marvel Universe A-Z.

== Fictional character biography ==
Born in South Africa in 1918, three-year-old David Rand accompanied his British parents John and Constance on a flight to Cairo to visit his grandfather. Unfortunately, their plane crashed in the Congo jungle. Constance died in the crash and John was driven mad. Living in the jungle with his father, isolated from the local tribes, David grew under the jungle's hardships into an unusually powerful youth and developed strong empathy with wildlife, notably rescuing Zar the Lion from quicksand. When a criminal named Paul de Kraft discovered emeralds in Congo, John died opposing him only for Zar to scare Paul de Kraft off. With the support of Zar, David became the jungle's leading warrior within a few years challenging different animals like Bardak the Ape and N'Jaga the Leopard. Considered to be "god-like" by the natives, David Rand ended up named Ka-Zar (native for "Brother of Zar"). When Paul de Kraft returned to seize the emerald deposits, Ka-Zar killed him, thus avenging his father.

With the help of the local animals, Ka-Zar established himself as the guardian of the jungle which involved meting out harsh retribution to any intruder seeking to exploit his resources-but he frequently aided more benign explorers, such as when he protected Prof. Rice and his daughter Mara from the criminal pilot "Red" Skelton, rescued Rita Grey from the Wabi tribe, and helped two Scotland Yard detectives capture murderer London Jack.

Ka-Zar's friends are an elephant named Trajah and a lion named Zar. When Zar was captured by the vicious Rajah Sarput and a big game hunter named Bradley, Ka-Zar stowed away on a ship when Zar was shipped to the United States. Though he managed to free Zar, Ka-Zar ended up being arrested when he tried to free the zoo animals. Fortunately, Ruth Wilson (another woman whom Ka-Zar had rescued during an African expedition), vouched for him. Ka-Zar and Zar were granted passage back to Africa on a British ship. Surviving attacks by entrenched Nazi forces, Ka-Zar and Zar confronted Sarput who was ultimately slain by their ally Trajah. Soon after, Ka-Zar learned he had inherited his father's Transvaal diamond mines. After preventing his inheritance's theft by John Rand's law partner Alec Wright, Ka-Zar donated the wealth to war relief in England.

In 1941, as America's superheroes were gearing up for World War II, Ka-Zar and his lion returned from America to his native Africa to spend some time fighting Italian and German troops. While on an expedition to the mysterious Black River Region, Ka-Zar encountered giants and subterranean lizard people. Ka-Zar managed to befriend a giant named Bogat. Ka-Zar later waged a series of campaigns against the Axis forces in Ethiopia, Somaliland, and anywhere else in Africa where the Axis forces were camped, killing them with their own weapons with help from the French and British forces. Following one such encounter, Ka-Zar was restored to health by an aged witch doctor, who gave him a brew used centuries before to grant his tribe superhuman strength.

Last time anyone heard from Ka-Zar, he protected his region's wildlife when Africa was threatened by monstrous tidal waves from Atlantean warfare. The rest of Ka-Zar's life after that was left unchronicled.

In the 1960s, Marvel Comics reintroduced a Ka-Zar character (named Kevin Reginald, Lord Plunder) into their universe of superhero characters, who still appears in their comics today occasionally.

== Reception ==
Robert Michael Bobb Cotter in the 2008 book The Great Monster Magazines points out that writer Bob Byrd "did little to distinguish his hero from the other [pulp magazine] noble savages, including beginning his name with the letter 'K', which for some reason had become the accepted letter to start an imitation Tarzan's name".
