= Jim Galton =

American business executive (1924–2017)

- Born: November 1, 1924; Lawrence, New York, U.S.
- Died: June 12, 2017 (aged 92); Naples, Florida, U.S.
- Education: Antioch College
- Occupation: Business executive
- Years active: 1978–2017
- Known for: MEG President
- Spouse: Lydia Galton
- Children: 4

James E. Galton (/ˈɡɔːltən/; November 1, 1924 – June 12, 2017) was an American business executive who was the president of Marvel Entertainment Group.

== Life ==
Galton grew up on Long Island in the 1930s. He attended Antioch College with a work study program to help pay for college. Initially a sociology major, he soon changed his major to business. He graduated in 1946. He married Lydia about 1967.

== Career ==
After graduating, Galton accepted an accountant position where he worked for four years. He then went to an advertising agency then to a magazine publisher, moving up the ladder. Galton eventually ended up at a paperback publisher, Popular Library Books. He was executive vice president when CBS purchased the company. He soon became president in 1968 only to be fired by new CBS leadership over his editorial based book manuscript selection method.

Galton then was hired by Cadence Industries as Marvel Comics Group president in 1975. He moved licensing in house starting with international in 1978 then domestic in 1981. He also moved the company more into animation with Marvel Productions in 1980 and publishing with Marvel Books division in 1982. He left Marvel in 1991. Galton died at his Naples, Florida home on June 12, 2017.

Preceded by Al Landau	Marvel Entertainment Group President; 1975–1991	Succeeded by Terry Stewart
