= Anthony Saunders (artist) =

British artist & painter (born 1964)

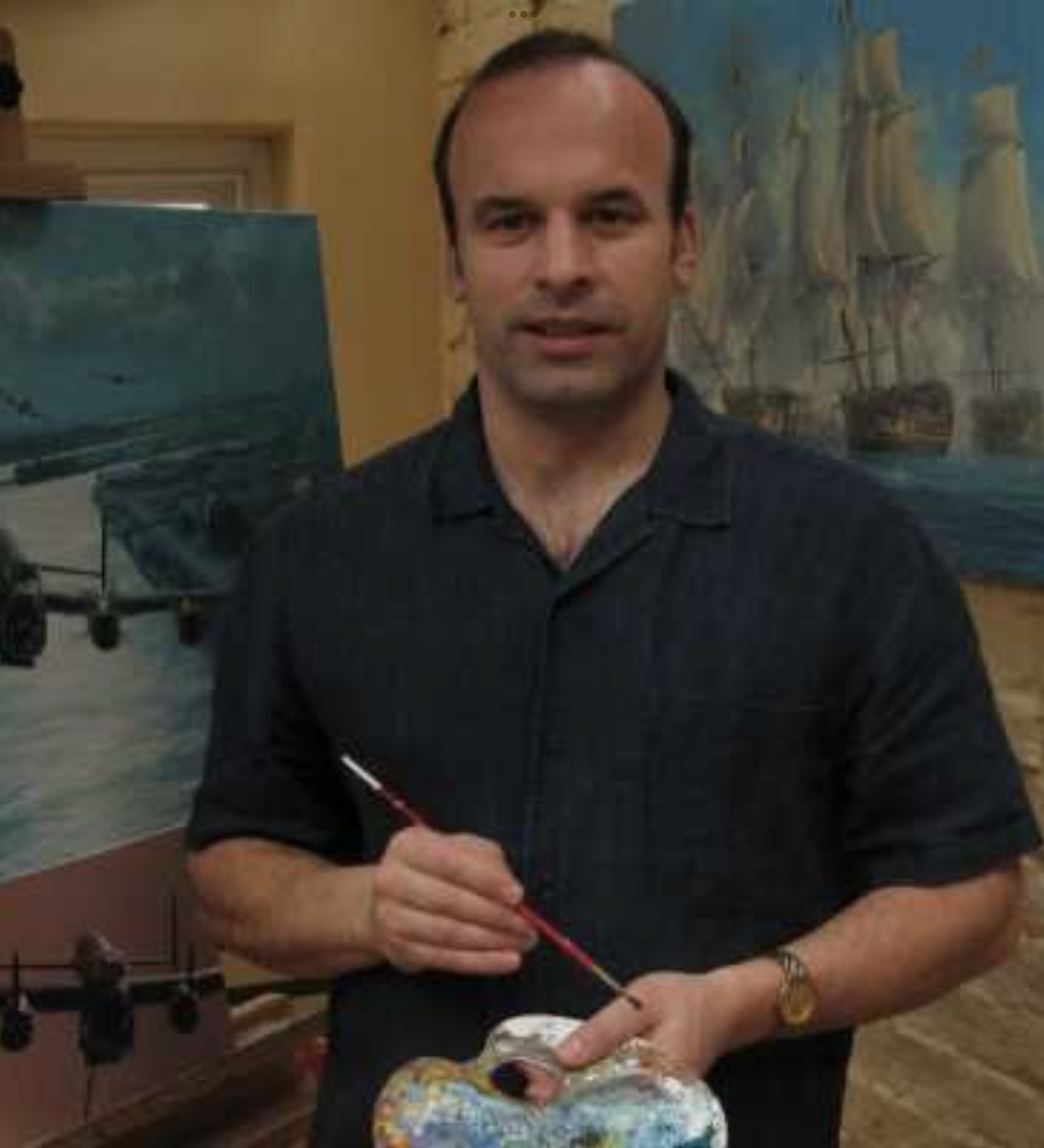
- Born: 1964 (age 60–61); England
- Occupation: Artist
- Known for: Aviation and Marine Painting

Anthony Saunders (born 1964) is a British artist and painter, best known for his aviation and marine oil paintings.

== Early life ==
Anthony Saunders was born in England in 1964. As a boy, he was fascinated by aviation, citing his earliest memory as seeing his family car airlifted onto the Armstrong Whitworth AW.660. He became a professional artist in the early 2000s.

== Fine art ==
His work primarily focuses on the energy and power of aircraft and ships, often depicting historical military engagements with a high degree of historical accuracy. Saunders spends considerable time researching each composition to ensure technical and historical correctness.

His art includes not only aviation themes but also extends to other subjects like historical scenes from Waterloo and the Crimea. His paintings are known for their vibrant use of oil colours, bringing to life the dynamism of aerial combat and marine battles.

Saunders' works are popular among collectors and are sold through various galleries specialising in military and aviation art. His art is appreciated for both its artistic quality and its historical fidelity, making it sought after by enthusiasts and historians alike.

Many of his works have been published as limited edition prints, often signed by both the artist and surviving pilots or crew members from the depicted scenes, adding a layer of historical authenticity and personal connection.

The late Squadron Leader George 'Johnny' Johnson (RAF officer), who was the last surviving original member of the "Dambusters" raid of 1943, said of Saunders, "I would like to stress the accuracy and attention to detail which is so much a pattern of Anthony's work. You can see exactly what is happening just by looking at the picture. There is simply no need for written words; the story is there on cavas for all to see."

== See also ==
Aviation artists

- Gil Cohen (artist)
- James Dietz
- Robert Taylor (British artist)
