= Men's adventure =

Genre of magazine appealing to men

The March 1963 cover of For Men Only promised, among other things, "Swastika Slave Girls in Argentina's No-Escape Brothel Camp!"

Men's adventure is a genre of magazine that was published in the United States from the 1940s until the early 1970s. Catering to a male audience, these magazines featured pin-up girls and lurid tales of adventure that typically were promoted as true stories narrated in first-person by the participants or in an 'as told to' style. Usual stories included wartime feats of daring, exotic travel or conflict with wild animals. These magazines were also colloquially called "armpit slicks", "men's sweat magazines" or "the sweats", especially by people in the magazine publishing or distribution trades.

== Overview ==
Fawcett Publications was having some success with their slick magazine True whose stories developed more of a war focus after the U.S. entered World War II in 1941. Pulp magazine Argosy opted to switch to slick paper in 1943, and mix in more 'true' stories amidst the fiction. The other major pulps Adventure, Blue Book and Short Stories eventually followed suit. Soon new magazines joined in - Fawcett's Cavalier, Stag and Swank. During their peak in the late 1950s, approximately 130 men's adventure magazines were being published simultaneously.

The interior tales usually claimed to be true stories. Women in distress were commonly featured in the painted covers or interior art, often being menaced or tortured by Nazis or, in later years, Communists. Typical titles which relied on especially lurid and salacious cover illustrations include Man's Story, Men Today, World of Men, and Man's Epic.

Many of the stories were actual historical accounts of battles and the biographies and exploits of highly decorated soldiers. Several of the stories were combined and issued under various titles in paperback editions by Pyramid Books with the credit "edited by Phil Hirsch". Phil Hirsch was vice president of Pyramid Books from 1955 to 1975.

In the 1970s, many of the men's adventure magazines dropped the fiction and "true action" stories, and started focusing on pictorials of nude women and non-fiction articles related to sex or current events.

== Contributors ==
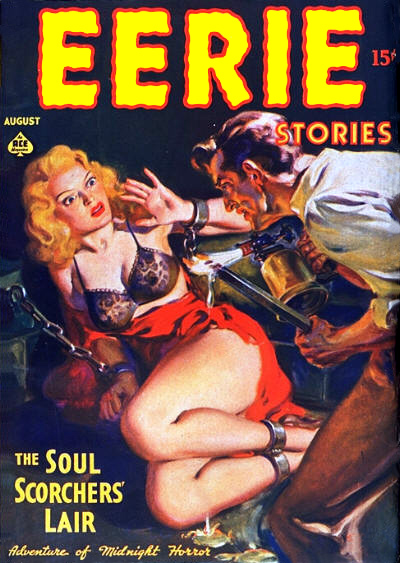
"The Soul Scorcher's Lair" by Norman Saunders from Eerie Stories number 1, August 1937.

Artist Norman Saunders was the dean of illustrators for these magazines, occupying a position similar to that enjoyed by Margaret Brundage for the classic pulps. Charles Copeland and Earl Norem were two other popular artists who worked for the Magazine Management stable of magazines. Many illustrations that were uncredited were done by Bruce Minney, Norm Eastman, Gil Cohen, Mel Crair, Basil Gogos, and Vic Prezio among others. James Bama contributed over 400 cover and interior illustrations for an approximately eight-year period circa 1957–1964 before turning to paperback cover illustration as his mainstay. Historical artist Mort Künstler painted many covers and illustrations for these magazines, and Playboy photographer Mario Casilli started out shooting pinups for this market.

At publisher Martin Goodman's Magazine Management Company, future best-selling humorist and author Bruce Jay Friedman was a men's sweat writer-editor, and Mario Puzo was a contributor before he became a well-known novelist. Pierre Boulle, Ray Bradbury, Erskine Caldwell, Ian Fleming, Robert F. Dorr and Mickey Spillane also contributed short stories or novel excerpts to men's adventure magazines. Lawrence Block wrote prolifically for magazines of this type; some of his stories from this era were collected in The Naked and the Deadly (2023).

== Legacy ==
Paperback novels became increasingly popular in the 1950s and 1960s, and series' such as Don Pendleton's The Executioner mined a similar vein of war story, and continued on long after the magazines themselves shifted away from such fare.

The title of the Frank Zappa and The Mothers of Invention album Weasels Ripped My Flesh was borrowed from a man-against-beast cover story in the September 1956 issue of Man's Life, and the title went through another permutation when filmmaker Nathan Schiff made the horror feature Weasels Rip My Flesh (1979).

There have been attempts to revive the Argosy title, once in the 1990s, again in 2004, and finally in 2013. Soldier of Fortune carried on the tradition of war stories for a male audience. A few contemporary "lad mag" periodicals such as FHM and Maxim are somewhat similar to the earlier adventure magazines, featuring a combination of glamour photography and occasional true adventure or survival stories. Publishers such as Hard Case Crime put out new and reprinted paperback novels in the hard-boiled pulp tradition. Online book vendor Amazon.com uses the genre label "men's adventure" in a general sense to categorize adventure novels where the hero is an adult man to distinguish these books from "women's adventure" and "children's action & adventure."
