= Joker (American magazine) =

American magazine

Spring 1942 issue

Joker was an American men's digest published by Humorama. The magazine was launched in Spring 1942. The publisher was Abe Goodman, brother of American publisher Martin Goodman.
