= Humorama =

Line of digest-sized magazines

- Company type: Division
- Industry: Publishing
- Founded: Mid-1950s
- Defunct: Mid-1960s
- Headquarters: Manhattan, New York City
- Key people: Martin Goodman; Abe Goodman
- Products: Magazine
- Parent: Red Circle

Humorama, a division of Martin Goodman's publishing firm, was a line of digest-sized magazines featuring girlie cartoons by Bill Ward, Bill Wenzel, Dan DeCarlo, Jack Cole and many others.

In addition to the cartoons, the magazines also displayed black-and-white photos of pin-up models, including Bettie Page, Eve Meyer and stripper Lili St. Cyr, plus actresses, including Joi Lansing, Tina Louise, Irish McCalla and Julie Newmar.

One of Martin Goodman's family members, Abe Goodman, headed this division. The line was published from at least the mid-1950s to mid-1960s. These titles were profitable for the company because the contents were inexpensive and production costs were minimal in comparison to the more complex full-size magazines published by the company.

== Humorama titles ==
- Breezy
- Cartoon Comedy-Parade
- Cartoon Parade
- Comedy
- Eyeful of Fun
- Fun House
- Gaze
- Gee-Whiz
- Humorama
- Instant Laughs
- Jest
- Joker
- Laugh Circus
- Laugh Digest
- Laugh It Off!
- Laugh Riot
- Popular Cartoons
- Popular Jokes
- Romp
- Stare
- Snappy
- Zip — not to be confused with the British men's magazine of the same name
