= The Frightened =

Radio program broadcast in the late 1950s

The Frightened was an American radio program broadcast in the late 1950s.

During 1956 Lyle Kenyon Engel put together a package of two radio shows and four magazines. The shows were American Agent, a spy drama, and The Frightened, narrated by Boris Karloff; the magazines included Tales of the Frightened, a tie in to the radio show.

The publisher, Republic Features Syndicate, went out of business in late 1957.
