= Xəzər =

- Municipality
- Location within Azerbaijan
- Coordinates: 39°15′11″N 48°55′17″E
- Country: Azerbaijan
- Rayon: Neftchala

Population (2008)
  - Total: 1,273
- Time zone: UTC+4 (AZT)
  - Summer (DST): UTC+5 (AZT)

Xəzər or Khazar is a village and municipality in the Neftchala Rayon of Azerbaijan. It has a population of 1,273.
