= Mort Künstler =

American artist (1927–2025)

- Born: Morton Künstler; August 28, 1927; New York City, U.S.
- Died: February 2, 2025 (aged 97); Rockville Centre, New York, U.S.
- Occupations: Illustrator, historical artist
- Years active: 1948–2025
- Known for: Magazine and book covers; historical art, Civil War art
- Spouse: Deborah Künstler
- Children: 3
- Website: mortkunstler.com

Morton Künstler (August 28, 1927 – February 2, 2025) was an American artist known for his illustrative paintings of historical events, especially of the American Civil War. He was a child prodigy, who, with encouragement from his parents, became a skilled artist by the time he was twelve. He was considered the "best-known and most respected historical artist in the country."

Künstler began his career in the 1950s as a freelance artist, illustrating paperback book covers and men's adventure magazines. In 1965 he was commissioned by National Geographic to create what became his first historic painting. He also created posters for movies such as The Poseidon Adventure and The Taking of Pelham One Two Three. And by the 1970s he was painting covers for Newsweek, Reader's Digest, and other magazines, with the bulk of his work during that period in advertising art.

While many of his early magazine illustrations were for public entertainment, Künstler eventually began creating military art. In 1977, his first major gallery exhibition brought new attention to his talents as a historical artist. By the 1980s he was acclaimed as America's foremost Civil War artist, and would eventually create over 350 Civil War paintings alone. Some of his paintings have changed opinions about the accuracy of early famous paintings by others, such as Emmanuel Leutze's famous Washington Crossing the Delaware. Besides his Civil War paintings, he created historical art of the American Revolution through the Korean and Vietnam wars, along with paintings of World War II. He painted historical events such as the Oklahoma Land Rush and new immigrants on Ellis Island.

Collections of Künstler's work are published as limited-edition prints, and his artistic output places him at the forefront of contemporary historical realism. NASA made him their official artist for the Space Shuttle Columbia. In 1982, CBS-TV had him do a painting for the 3-part mini-series The Blue and the Gray, and in 1993 a one-hour television special, Images of the Civil War - The Paintings of Mort Künstler, was shown on the A&E TV network. He has received numerous honors and awards, and at least nine books are dedicated to featuring his artwork. Some experts see him as the next Norman Rockwell.

== Early years and education ==
Künstler was born in Brooklyn, New York in 1927 and grew up there during the Great Depression. His parents had Polish and Austrian roots and were of Jewish heritage. Künstler's father was an amateur artist and his mother, a school teacher. Both his parents recognized Mort's artistic talent when he was young. they encouraged him to practice and enrolled him in Saturday classes at the Brooklyn Museum.

His talent in art was further supported when he was at Abraham Lincoln High School in Brooklyn, inspired by his art teacher, Leon Friend. After graduating high school he enrolled at Brooklyn College to study art, although his main focus became athletics. He excelled in several sports. He then received a basketball scholarship from the University of California, Los Angeles (UCLA), where he continued to focus on sports.

After Künstler's father suffered a heart attack, he returned to New York to help his family, and enrolled in Brooklyn's Pratt Institute, studying to become a fine art illustrator, and graduated after three years. (There, he met his wife, Deborah; they married soon after he graduated.) Among the artists whose work he studied that influenced his later career were Norman Rockwell, Winslow Homer, and Frederic Remington.

== Early jobs ==
I never realized that when I was a student. But there were no real jobs except in advertising as sketch artists or whatever. They didn’t do finished art. I think I’m the only one who eventually did very well as a professional illustrator. It was not a good time to be going into the field.

— Mort Kunstler

After graduating from Pratt he worked as a freelance artist in New York, where he tried to get assignments from book and magazine publishers. That goal became difficult at the time, which led him to work instead as an apprentice at a studio, where he ran errands, cleaned up and touched up paintings by other artists. Künstler wanted to be a professional illustrator, but discovered that the early 1950s was a bad time to enter the field, since photography and television were replacing the need for artists. And the few magazines that still relied on artists were folding.

However, he did find a niche market as a freelancer for adventure magazines, which still appreciated his art: “Fortunately for me and other artists, some of them, like the men’s adventure magazines, would still prefer having paintings made for their covers and interior illustrations.” He continued doing those throughout the 1950s and into the 1960s, although to make ends meet he had to live with his parents, who supported him during this early period: “I worked 12 hour days, 15 hour days, sometimes seven days a week. Almost always six days a week, from nine o’clock in the morning to ten or eleven at night.”

Eventually he began to share a studio with another already established adventure artist, George Gross, whose family was friends with his. “I used to call him Uncle George and I chose him as my mentor.” George, 22 years his senior, had also attended Pratt Institute, and his father had a successful art career. As a result, says Künstler, “I wasn’t just a kid working out of his house anymore... George sort of took me under his wing, and he taught me whatever he could. It was a wonderful thing for me.”

== 1950s–1960s ==
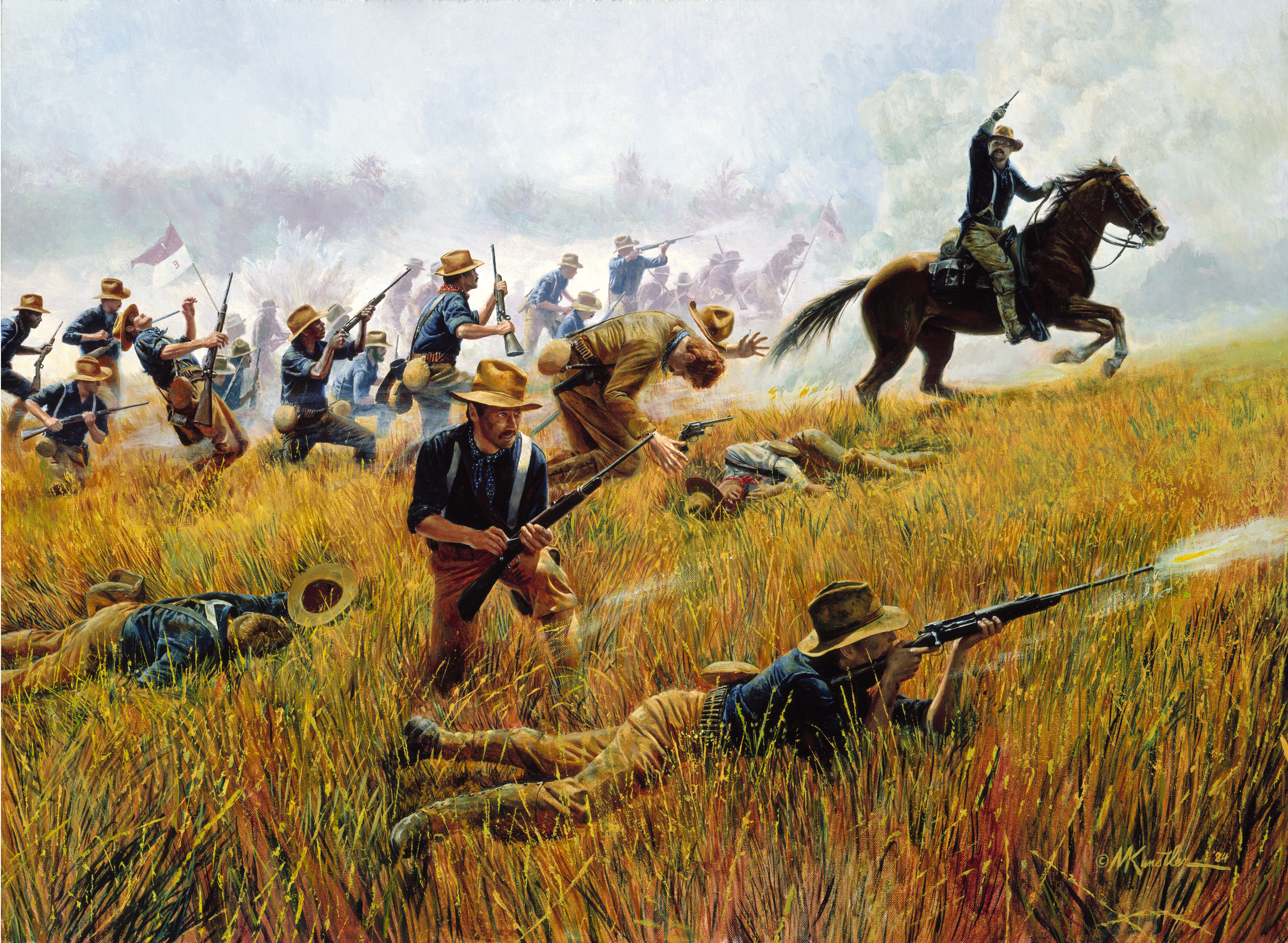
The Rough Riders, painted by Künstler for the National Guard

Künstler began working full-time as a freelance artist, illustrating magazine covers and paperback fiction adventure books, typically oriented toward men, such as Sports Afield, Outdoor Life, and Stag. Künstler credited the experience gained from illustrating men’s adventure magazines in the 1950s and 1960s with teaching him how to compose and tell a story, which he said prepared him for his later work.

He received his first assignment to do a historic painting from National Geographic magazine in 1965. He was to paint an illustration for a story about the history of St. Augustine, Florida. He traveled to Florida, spent an afternoon with the two National Park Service historians at the National Historic Site “Castillo de San Marcos” to learn whatever he could, before beginning. Künstler's later historical paintings would also rely on collaboration with experts who would guide and provide him with the historic facts he needed before beginning.

== 1970s ==
In the 1970s, Künstler painted covers for Newsweek, Reader's Digest and other magazines, although the bulk of his work during this period came from doing advertising art. He also did the box covers for Aurora models.

He illustrated a number of movie posters for adventure films, such as The Poseidon Adventure (1972) and The Taking of Pelham One Two Three (1974). In 1975 Künstler created the illustration for a MAD Magazine back cover depicting women's liberation; several issues later, he crafted a front cover which parodied the movie Jaws. By the early 1970s, his paintings were attracting the attention of serious art collectors, which led him to begin retaining the reproduction rights to his original paintings. In 1975 he submitted a number of paintings to galleries, all of which sold, to his surprise. In 1977 his military art drew attention from even more important galleries, which made him widely recognized as an accurate historical artist.

The first major gallery to give him a one-man show was the prestigious Hammer Galleries in New York City. He would have 13 additional one-man shows at the gallery in subsequent years, while his work was also being exhibited in museums nationwide. Armand Hammer, founder of Hammer Galleries, supported, encouraged and promoted Künstler's work, helping him become recognized as one of America's leading historical artists. Hammer said "his paintings have continually confirmed his talent, and the caliber of Künstler's overall artistic output has now placed him at the forefront of contemporary realism."

As a result of major galleries and museums exhibiting his work, his career soon took on new dimensions. From his early popularity as an illustrator for pulp and popular magazines, then to movie posters, National Geographic images, and now to fine art historical paintings and prints, along with books of images, he was acknowledged as one of the few remaining artists of historical subjects.

== 1980–2025 ==
In 1982, after getting a commission from CBS-TV to do a painting for the 3-part mini-series, The Blue and the Gray (televised November 1982,) Künstler's interest turned towards the American Civil War. By 1988 he was concentrating almost entirely on Civil War subjects, which eventually made him the “most collected Civil War artist in America.” His focus on that war led to him having the first one-man Civil War exhibitions at venues such as the Gettysburg National Battlefield, New York's Nassau County Museum of Art in 1998, the North Carolina Museum of History, Richmond's Museum of the Confederacy and other centers of art and history. They included images of Abraham Lincoln at Gettysburg.

Mort Künstler is the foremost Civil War artist of our time -- if not of all time. To study his paintings is to simply see history alive.

— James I. Robertson, Jr., Civil War scholar

His exhibition at the Nassau County Museum, which lasted seven weeks, attracted more than 30,000 visitors, surpassing the previous attendance record set by a Picasso exhibition. The success of that exhibition led the museum to hold a second one-man show of his work in 2006.

To create his paintings, he undertook careful and painstaking research into the settings and events he would paint. It meant he needed to consult with expert historians and walk the actual battlefields before drawing them, always looking for landmarks to incorporate into the artwork. This obsession to detail, he said, came from his experience illustrating men's magazines and his work for National Geographic. In preparation for his 1992 painting, “The Gunner and the Colonel,” for instance, he researched the exact uniforms the soldiers wore and even the weather on that day, to learn which way the wind was blowing so the flags were unfurled in the right direction. With each new painting, Künstler said he took on the role of a historian:

I feel like I'm opening a window on a little part of history. What I try to do is create an image that will make you feel like you were there. I try to make it as accurate and as dramatic as possible.

His battle of Gettysburg painting, titled “High Water Mark,” was unveiled at the Gettysburg Battlefield Museum on the 125th anniversary of that climactic confrontation. The original was reproduced with 750,000 limited-edition prints, which sold out after two months. But Künstler also painted individual soldiers in periods of personal crisis, as he did of Stonewall Jackson after Jackson learned that a close friend's 5-year-old daughter had died.

With collections of his work published as limited edition prints and sold nationwide. Historians including James M. McPherson said:

Of all the artists working in the Civil War field, none captures the human element, the aura of leadership, the sense of being there and sharing in the drama, quite like Mort Künstler.

Künstler took a month or two to complete a painting, with many selling for over $100,000. Limited edition prints often sell out quickly. The American Print Gallery's limited edition of 4,150 of Moonlight and Magnolias was sold out in three weeks after publication. By 2015, Künstler had painted more than 350 Civil War subjects. His final painting, completed in 2019, was a scene of General Robert E. Lee on Saint Simon Island in Georgia early in the Civil War, according to his daughter Jane, who is also his business manager, as cited in his Newsday obituary. Künstler died at a hospice in Rockville Centre, New York, on February 2, 2025, at the age of 97.

=== Washington Crossing ===
Some of his paintings have revised opinions of many about the accuracy of earlier paintings by others. One of Kunstler's more recent paintings has, according to recent historians, corrected some obvious inaccuracies of one America's most famous, the 1851 painting by Emmanuel Leutze, Washington Crossing the Delaware, depicting Washington's 1776 surprise attack on the German soldiers at Trenton who were fighting for the British.

Künstler devoted two months of research with the aid of military experts and historians, besides visiting the location himself, before completing the painting in 2011, titled “Washington's Crossing.” Among the inaccuracies Künstler corrected was that Washington would not have been able to stand in a rowboat in daylight during a snowstorm, since it would have capsized. Nor would there be small icebergs in the water or the flag shown in the painting to have been used, since it was not adopted until the following year.

Historian and author David Hackett Fischer said that the painting by Künstler was “quite accurate...He got more right about the crossing than any other image,” which included more than 200 previous paintings depicting that event. Although the new image is about 4 feet wide and 3 feet high, compared to Leutze's, which is about 21 feet wide and 12 feet high, Künstler says it is “the most important painting I've ever done." Civil War historian Harold Holzer, formerly with the Metropolitan Museum of Art, which owns the original Leutze painting, called Künstler "the best-known and most respected historical artist in this country."

=== Other works ===
His later work covered a wider range of subject, including all the wars from the American Revolution through the Korean and Vietnam wars, with many paintings of World War II. He painted historical events such as the Oklahoma Land Rush and he tried to humanize emotional settings by paintings of new immigrants at Ellis Island or Teddy Roosevelt celebrating the 4th of July. Some experts feel that it was Künstler's ability to humanize such moments which distinguished his works from most other historical artists.

He also painted subjects which illustrated American technological advances including dramatic illustrations of the space shuttle Columbia, for which NASA made him their official artist. His paintings recorded its manufacture, launching and landing.

In 1998, his paintings were exhibited at The North Carolina Museum of Art and at other U.S. museums, including the National Civil War Museum in Harrisburg, Pennsylvania; the North Carolina Museum of History in Raleigh, and the Museum of the Confederacy in Richmond. Among the eight books featuring his work, is the 1986 coffee-table book The American Spirit: The Paintings of Mort Künstler, which contains nearly 200 images and commentary written by historian Henry Steele Commager. An updated edition of The American Spirit was published in 1994.

== Awards and honors ==
- 1999, Virginia “Mort Künstler Day.”
- 2001, Henry Timrod Southern Culture Award.
- 2002, six-month, sole-artist exhibition at the new National Civil War Museum in Harrisburg, Pennsylvania.
- 2003, Jefferson Davis Southern Heritage Award, by the Military Order of the Stars and Bars.
- 2003, A residence hall at Timber Ridge School for special students in Winchester, Virginia, was named Mort Künstler Hall, because of his art assistance.
- 2004, Named an official artist for the H. L. Hunley, a submarine of the Confederate States of America, at which time he unveiled a new painting of the vessel during ceremonies in Charleston, South Carolina

== Bibliography ==
- Images of the Civil War: the Paintings of Mort Künstler (1992), ISBN 978-0-517-07356-8
- Gettysburg: The Paintings of Mort Künstler (Text by James M. McPherson) (1993), ISBN 1-878685-79-1
- The American Spirit: The Paintings of Mort Kunstler (1994) ISBN 1558533095
- Jackson & Lee: Legends in Gray (1995), ISBN 978-1-55853-333-2
- Mort Künstler's Old West. Cowboys. (1998), ISBN 978-1-55853-588-6
- Mort Künstler's Old West. Indians. (1998), ISBN 978-1-55853-589-3
- Gods and Generals: the Paintings of Mort Künstler (2002), ISBN 978-0-86713-084-3
- The Civil War Paintings of Mort Künstler (2006), ISBN 978-1-58182-556-5
- For Us the Living: The Civil War in Paintings and Eyewitness Accounts (2010), ISBN 978-1-4027-7034-0
