= Cadence Industries =

American conglomerate (1962–1986)

Cadence Industries Corporation
- The stock certificate image used under its former name, Perfect Film & Chemical Corporation
- Formerly: Perfect Film & Chemical Corporation (1962–1973)
- Company type: Public
- Industry: Medication; Publishing
- Predecessor: United Whelan Corporation; Hudson National; Perfect Photos; Equality Plastics Inc.
- Founded: 1962; 64 years ago
- Founder: Martin S. Ackerman
- Defunct: 1986; 40 years ago
- Fate: Liquidated
- Headquarters: Caldwell, New Jersey, United States
- Products: Drugs; Health aids; Vitamins; Magazines; Comic books
- Services: Film processor Mail order
- Divisions: Marvel Comics Group (1973–1986)
- Subsidiaries: Curtis Circulation (1969–1986); Magazine Management (1968–1973); Marvel Entertainment Group (1986); Plume & Atwood Industries (1968–1970); Popular Library (1968–1970)

Cadence Industries Corporation, formerly known as Perfect Film & Chemical Corporation, was an American conglomerate owned by Martin S. Ackerman. From 1968 through 1986, Cadence Industries was the parent company of Marvel Comics Group (formerly known as Magazine Management).

== History ==
=== Perfect Film ===
Perfect Film & Chemical Corporation (Perfect Film) was formed in 1962 by Martin S. Ackerman from parts of his first four acquisitions: United Whelan Corporation, Hudson National, Perfect Photos, and Equality Plastics Inc. Hudson was a mail-order pharmaceuticals firm, and Equality Plastics, a consumer-products distributor. Perfect Film sold off Whelan drugstores and the Pathé motion picture laboratory.

In early 1968, Perfect Film purchased Popular Library, a paperback book company. In 1968, Perfect Film loaned $5 million to Curtis Publishing Company, publisher of the Saturday Evening Post, at the request of Curtis' primary loan holder, First National Bank of Boston. In June and July 1968, Perfect Film sold US$40 million worth of securities, more than double the company's long-term debt. Later that year, it bought out publisher Martin Goodman – owner of Magazine Management Company, the parent of Marvel Comics and other ventures – and made Magazine Management the direct subsidiary. It placed its other corporations as subsidiaries of that. Also in 1968, Perfect Film purchased the Desilu Studios-Culver City complex and Plume & Atwood Industries.

In March 1969, Perfect Film and Commonwealth United Corporation had tentatively agreed to a merger of Commonwealth and Plume & Atwood. Despite attempts to revive the Saturday Evening Post 's circulation, and with the lack of a purchaser, Curtis Publishing shut the magazine down in 1969. Perfect Film purchased Curtis Circulation Company that same year from Curtis Publishing. Also in 1969, OSF Industries purchased the Desilu Studios in Culver City from the corporation, becoming The Culver City Studios the following year. Ackerman left Perfect Film In 1969.

Perfect Film sold Popular Library in 1970 to Fawcett Publications In July 1970, Perfect Film agreed to sell its 50.5% ownership in Plume & Atwood to Cinerama.

=== Cadence Industries ===
Under president and CEO Sheldon Feinberg, the Company renamed itself Cadence Industries Corporation in 1970. In 1981, Cadence's Hudson Pharmaceutical Corporation hired Venet Advertising to advertise the company's Hudson Vitamins unit, makers of Spider-Man chewable vitamins.

Mario Gabelli had invested in Cadence as he and his investing firm specialized in investing in potential takeover targets. In 1983, Cadence's management, including Marvel President Jim Galton, made an offer for the company's share in order to take the company private. Gabelli considered the offer low and instead put the share up for sale on the open market. Cadence executives sued Gabelli over that attempted share sale, claiming the sale was an attempt to take control. When Cadence Industries was liquidated in 1986, it sold Marvel Entertainment Group to New World Pictures while Curtis Circulation was sold to Joseph M. Walsh and Hachette Distribution Services.

== Units ==
- Curtis Publishing Company (control) (1968–1969)
  - Curtis Circulation Company (1968–1986)
- Data Systems for Health
- Hudson Pharmaceutical Corporation
  - Hudson Vitamins
- Magazine Management (1968–1973) / Marvel Comics Group (1973–1986) / Marvel Entertainment Group (1986)
  - Marvel Comics
  - Marvel Productions
- Perfect Subscription Companies
- Plume & Atwood
- Popular Library (1968–1970)
- US Pencil and Stationery Company
