= Khazar-e Yek =

Khazar-e Yek خزريك
- Village
- Location within Iran
- Coordinates: 31°42′31″N 48°42′12″E
- Country: Iran
- Province: Khuzestan
- County: Shushtar
- Bakhsh: Shadravan
- Rural District: Shoaybiyeh-ye Gharbi

Population (2006)
  - Total: 336
- Time zone: UTC+3:30 (IRST)
  - Summer (DST): UTC+4:30 (IRDT)

Khazar-e Yek (Persian: خزريك, also Romanized as Khaẕar-e Yek and Kheẕer-e Yek) is a village in Shoaybiyeh-ye Gharbi Rural District, Shadravan District, Shushtar County, Khuzestan Province, Iran. At the 2006 census, its population was 336, in 48 families.
