= Khazar-e Seh =

Khazar-e Seh خزرسه
- Village
- Location within Iran
- Coordinates: 31°42′54″N 48°41′58″E
- Country: Iran
- Province: Khuzestan
- County: Shushtar
- Bakhsh: Shadravan
- Rural District: Shoaybiyeh-ye Gharbi

Population (2006)
  - Total: 34
- Time zone: UTC+3:30 (IRST)
  - Summer (DST): UTC+4:30 (IRDT)

Khazar-e Seh (Persian: خزرسه, also Romanized as Khaẕar-e Seh and Kheẕer-e Seh) is a village in Shoaybiyeh-ye Gharbi Rural District, Shadravan District, Shushtar County, Khuzestan Province, Iran. At the 2006 census, its population was 34, in 8 families.
