= Stag (magazine) =

American men's magazines

Stag was the name of various American men's magazines published from the 1930s through at least the 1990s.

== Publication history ==
=== First publication ===
The first Stag, published by Leeds Publishing Corp., beginning with vol. 1, #1 (June 1937), was a 25-cent, 96-page, digest subtitled "A Magazine for Men" and which included articles and stories by such writers as Carleton Beals, Elsa Maxwell, Bernard Sobel, and Hendrik Willem van Loon. It covered a range of topics, including literature, music, sports, and theater, along with stories on male-female relationships, sexual issues, and such topics as striptease.

=== Second publication ===
A second Stag, published by Official Com. Inc. and edited by Noah Sarlat, appeared circa 1951 as a 25-cent, 82-page, standard-sized men's adventure magazine. This version, containing ostensibly "true-life" fiction of men in wartime or in rugged adventure mode, continued through at least volume 22 in 1971. In 1958, Martin Goodman took over the magazine, using first his Atlas Magazines imprint, and then switching to his Magazine Management imprint circa 1970 with the cover price rising to 50 cents.

In 1953, the publisher at the time threatened fledgling magazine founder Hugh Hefner with a trademark infringement lawsuit unless he changed the name of his planned men's magazine, Stag Party; Hefner redubbed the magazine Playboy.

Goodman also published the annual publication Stag Annual, starting in 1964.

Writer Dorothy Gallagher reminisced in 1998 that by the early 1960s, when Magazine Management occupied the second floor at 60th Street and Madison Avenue,

...magazines were produced the way Detroit produced cars. I worked on the fan-magazine line. On the other side of a five-foot partition was the romance-magazine line. And across a corridor were the financial staples of the organization, the men's magazines — Stag, For Men Only, Male — for which, at one time or another, Mario Puzo, Bruce Jay Friedman, David Markson, Mickey Spillane and Martin Cruz Smith wrote, until they became too exalted and rich to do it anymore.

Cover illustrators included Frank Soltesz. Bruce Minney, and Mort Kunstler.

==== Transition to pornography ====
Stag transitioned to become a men's pornographic magazine, published by Goodman's son Charles "Chip" Goodman at Magazine Management's successor company, Swank Publications. The Magna Publishing Group bought Stag and its sister publication Swank from that company in 1993.
