= Ka-Zar (magazine) =

Defunct American pulp magazine

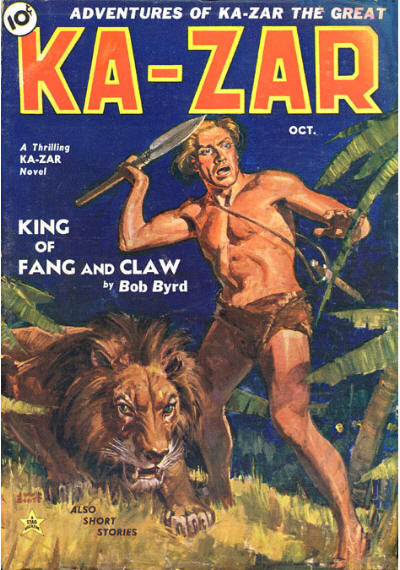
Cover of the first issue; the artwork is by J. W. Scott

Ka-Zar was an American pulp magazine that published three issues in 1936 and 1937, edited by Martin Goodman. The lead character was modeled after Tarzan and the lead novel and short stories in each issue were adventures set in the jungle.

== Publication history and contents ==
Each issue had a lead novel, featuring Ka-Zar, a character modeled after Tarzan. Ka-Zar had been born David Rand, orphaned in the Congo when a plane crash killed his parents, John and Constance. David was raised by a lion named Zar, and can speak to animals. The novels, written by Martin Goodman under the pseudonym Bob Byrd, are described by pulp historian Robert Weinberg as "all clearly derivative...[showing] no originality in either content or form". The first, King of Fang and Claw, tells the story of the plane crash, and Ka-Zar's revenge on the men who caused it. The other two novels are titled Roar of the Jungle and The Lost Empire. The novels were supplemented by short stories, all of which were jungle adventures. Contributors included Rex Allen and Norman Daniels.

Ka-Zar was published by Manvis Publishing of New York, and edited by Martin Goodman. All issues were in pulp format and priced at 10 cents; the first two issues were 128 pages and the last issue was 112 pages. It began as a quarterly, with issues dated October 1936 and January 1937, but the final issue was delayed until June 1937. The final issue was retitled Ka-Zar the Great.

The lead novel appeared in book form in the UK as King of Fang and Claw in 1937, published by Brown & Watson. The first issue was reprinted in facsimile format with an article replacing the editorial matter in 1976 by Odyssey Publications.

== Sources ==
- Weinberg, Robert (1985). "Ka-Zar". In Tymn, Marshall B.; Ashley, Mike (eds.). Science Fiction, Fantasy and Weird Fiction Magazines. Westport, Connecticut: Greenwood Press. pp. 368–369. ISBN 0-3132-1221-X.
