= Khazar-e Do =

Khazar-e Do خزردو
- Village
- Location within Iran
- Coordinates: 31°42′04″N 48°42′33″E
- Country: Iran
- Province: Khuzestan
- County: Shushtar
- Bakhsh: Shadravan
- Rural District: Shoaybiyeh-ye Gharbi

Population (2006)
  - Total: 96
- Time zone: UTC+3:30 (IRST)
  - Summer (DST): UTC+4:30 (IRDT)

Khazar-e Do (Persian: خزردو, also Romanized as Khaẕar-e Do and Kheẕer-e Do) is a village in Shoaybiyeh-ye Gharbi Rural District, Shadravan District, Shushtar County, Khuzestan Province, Iran. At the 2006 census, its population was 96, in 13 families.
