= Robert Taylor (British artist) =

British military artist (1946–2024)

Robert Taylor (1946 – 4 January 2024) was a British artist, best known for his depictions of military aircraft, particularly from World War II.

== Career ==
Born in 1946, Taylor lived and worked in Bath, where he was trained at the Bath School of Art.

His art on military aircraft is showcased in galleries in the UK, the USA, Europe, Australia, and Japan.

== Personal life and death ==
Robert Taylor died in early 2024 after a short illness.
