= Magazine Management =

American publishing company (1947–1973)

Magazine Management Co., Inc.
- The logo utilized by Magazine Management under the Marvel Comics Group name
- Type: Subsidiary
- Industry: Publishing
- Genre: Men's magazines, humor, romance, comics
- Founded: c.1947; 79 years ago
- Founder: Martin Goodman
- Defunct: 1973; 53 years ago
- Fate: Rebranded as Marvel Comics Group, assets merged with Marvel Comics
- Successor: Marvel Comics Group
- Headquarters: New York City, New York, United States
- Products: Comics, magazines
- Parent: Cadence Industries (1968–1973)
- Subsidiaries: Humorama; Marvel Comics

Magazine Management Co., Inc. was an American publishing company lasting from at least c. 1947 to the early 1970s, known for men's-adventure magazines, risqué men's magazines, humor, romance, puzzle, celebrity/film and other types of magazines, and later adding comic books and black-and-white comics magazines to the mix. It was the parent company of Atlas Comics, and its rebranded incarnation, Marvel Comics.

Founded by Martin Goodman, who had begun his career in the 1930s with pulp magazines published under a variety of shell companies, Magazine Management served as an early employer of such staff writers as Rona Barrett, Bruce Jay Friedman, David Markson, Mario Puzo, Martin Cruz Smith, Mickey Spillane, and Ernest Tidyman.

Subsidiaries of Magazine Management included Humorama, which published digest-sized magazines of girlie cartoons; and Marvel Comics. The company also published black-and-white comics magazines such as Vampire Tales, Savage Tales, and Unknown Worlds of Science Fiction that utilized primarily Marvel writers and artists.

== History ==
Founded by Martin Goodman, who had begun his career in the 1930s with pulp magazines published under a variety of shell companies, Magazine Management existed as of at least 1947. By the early 1960s, the company occupied the second floor at 60th Street and Madison Avenue. It published men's-adventure magazines with such writers as Bruce Jay Friedman, David Markson, Mario Puzo, Martin Cruz Smith, Mickey Spillane, and Ernest Tidyman; film magazines with writers including Rona Barrett; and humor publications, among other types. By the late 1960s, its men's-adventure magazines such as Stag and Male had begun evolving into men's magazines, with pictorials about dancers and swimsuit models replaced by bikinis and discreet nude shots, with gradually fewer fiction stories, and eventually into pornographic magazines.

One division of the company was the Marvel Comics Group. As one-time Marvel editor-in-chief Roy Thomas recalled, "I was startled to learn in '65 that Marvel was just part of a parent company called Magazine Management."

In late 1968, Goodman sold all his publishing businesses to the Perfect Film and Chemical Corporation, which made the subsidiary Magazine Management Company the parent company of all the acquired Goodman concerns. Goodman remained as publisher until 1972. Perfect Film and Chemical renamed itself Cadence Industries and renamed Magazine Management as Marvel Comics Group in 1973, the first of many changes, mergers, and acquisitions that led to what became the 21st century corporation Marvel Entertainment.

== Culture ==
As writer Dorothy Gallagher reminisced in 1998,

At Magazine Management, magazines were produced the way Detroit produced cars. I worked on the fan-magazine line. On the other side of a five-foot partition was the romance-magazine line. And across a corridor were the financial staples of the organization, the men's magazines — Stag, For Men Only, Male — for which, at one time or another, Mario Puzo, Bruce Jay Friedman, David Markson, Mickey Spillane and Martin Cruz Smith wrote, until they became too exalted and rich to do it anymore. I'm almost forgetting the comic-book line, where Stan Lee [co-]created Spider-Man, known to every connoisseur of classic comics. ... [Th]e decor was insurance-company blah: grayish white walls and foam-tile ceilings, overhead fluorescent fixtures, gray metal desks. Except for the executive offices, which faced Madison Avenue and had carpets and windows, the space was divided into jerrybuilt bull pens with head-high partitions. Editors got a glassed-in area in each bullpen.

Author Adam Parfrey, in his book about men's adventure magazines, described how,

Most scribes laboring for Martin Goodman's Magazine Management firm and other repositories of adventure magazines spoke of feeling like well-compensated slaves of a very particular style ('man triumphant') that was not their own. This was not the style with which editor Bruce Jay Friedman felt most comfortable, and when editing publications for Martin Goodman he unsuccessfully tried to talk him out of running advertisements for trusses, an ad signalling the magazine's target audience: blue-collar yahoos. It would be years before he could raise his head at industry cocktail parties, when his acclaimed examples of 'black-humor fiction' were seen as appropriate material for a hipper, more monied crowd.

== Titles published ==
=== Humor magazines ===
- Best Cartoons from the Editors of Male & Stag, Magazine Management—published at least from 1973 to 1975)
- Cartoon Capers—published at least from vol. 4, #2 (1969) to vol. 10, #3 (1975)
- Cartoon Laughs—confirmed extant: vol 12, #3 (1973)
- Humorama titles

=== Men's-adventure and erotic magazines ===
Magazine Management's publications included such men's adventure magazines as For Men Only, Male and Stag, edited during the 1950s by Noah Sarlat. As well, there were such ephemera as a one-shot black-and-white "nudie cutie" comic, The Adventures of Pussycat (Oct. 1968), that reprinted some stories of the sexy, tongue-in-cheek secret-agent strip that ran in some of his men's magazines. Marvel Comics writers Stan Lee, Larry Lieber and Ernie Hart, and artists Wally Wood, Al Hartley, Jim Mooney, and Bill Everett and "good girl art" cartoonist Bill Ward contributed.

==== Launched pre-1970 ====
Male vol. 26, #3 (March 1976)

- Action Life — ran 16 issues, Atlas Magazines
- Complete Man — published June 1965? to April 1967?, Atlas Magazines/Diamond
- For Men Only — confirmed at least from vol. 4, #11 (Dec. 1957) through at least vol. 26, #3 (March 1976)

Published by Canam Publishers at least 1957), Newsstand Publications Inc. (at least 1966–1967), Perfect Film Inc. (at least 1968), Magazine Management Co. Inc. (at least 1970)

- Male — published at least vol. 1, #2 (July 1950) through 1977
- Male Home Companion
- Stag — at least 314 issues published February 1942 – Feb. 1976

Published by Official Communications Inc. (1951), Official Magazines (Feb. 1952 – March 1958), Atlas (July 1958 – Oct. 1968), Magazine Management (Dec. 1970 to end)

- Stag Annual — at least 18 issues published 1964–1975

Published by Atlas (1964–1968), Magazine Management (1970–1975)

- Swank

1977 issue of Celebrity

- Men published by Magazine Management.

==== 1970s and later ====
- FILM International — covering R- through X-rated movies

=== Other magazines ===
- Celebrity—extant in at least 1977
- Modern Movies
- Movie World
- Screen Stars
