= Martin Goodman (publisher) =

Publisher; founder of Marvel Comics

- Born: Moe Goodman; January 18, 1908 Brooklyn, New York, U.S.
- Died: June 6, 1992 (aged 84) Palm Beach, Florida, U.S.
- Area: Publisher
- Notable works: Marvel Comics; Magazine Management Company; Atlas/Seaboard Comics
- Spouse: Jean Davis
- Children: 3

Martin Goodman (also Morris Goodman; born Moe Goodman; January 18, 1908 – June 6, 1992) was an American publisher of pulp magazines, digest sized magazines, paperback books, men's adventure magazines, and comic books, who founded the comics magazine company Timely Comics in 1939. Timely Comics would go on to become Marvel Comics, one of the United States' two largest comic book publishers along with rival DC Comics.

== Biography ==
Moe Goodman, who would later adopt the name Martin, was the oldest son of 13 recorded children of Isaac Goodman (b. 1872) and Anna Gleichenhaus (b. 1875). His parents were Jewish immigrants who had met in the United States after separately moving from their native Vilna, Lithuania, then part of the Russian Empire. The family lived at different homes in the New York City borough of Brooklyn. As a young man, Moe traveled around the country during the Great Depression, living in hobo camps.

=== Pulp magazines and Timely Comics ===
Circa late 1929, future Archie Comics co-founder Louis Silberkleit, then circulation manager at the magazine distribution company Eastern Distributing Corporation, hired Goodman for his department, assigning him clients that included publisher Hugo Gernsback. Goodman later became circulation manager himself, but the company went bankrupt in October 1932. Goodman then joined Silberkleit and other investors as part owner of Mutual Magazine Distributors, and was named editor of Silberkleit's new sister company, the publisher Newsstand Publications Inc., at 53 Park Place, also known as 60 Murray Street, in Manhattan. (Note: A 2003 account by journalist and later Archie Comics publicist Rik Offenberger, writing about the formation of Archie, maintains that, "In the early 1930s Louis Silberkleit, Martin Goodman, and Maurice Coyne started Columbia Publications"—a company unrelated to the later Columbia Comics, which began in 1940. "Goodman soon left that company and it was owned solely by Louis Silberkleit and Maurice Coyne. Columbia was one of the last pulp companies, putting out its last pulp in the late 50s ..." Bell and Vassallo's 2013 book disputes that Goodman was involved in Columbia Publications, saying, "[T]here is no evidence that Columbia Publications existed before Goodman and Silberkleit parted company in 1934. ... Sources contributing to the myth: the late Jerry Bails's Who's Who of American Comics, the late Les Daniels in Marvel: Five Fabulous Decades of the World's Greatest Comics, and David Saunders in Illustration Magazine #14, Summer 2005.")

The pulp magazine Uncanny Tales (May 1940), bearing Goodman's Red Circle logo

Goodman's first publication was the Newsstand Publications pulp magazine Western Supernovel Magazine, premiering with cover-date May 1933. After the first issue he renamed it Complete Western Book Magazine, beginning with cover-date July 1933. Goodman's pulp magazines included All Star Adventure Fiction, Complete Western Book, Mystery Tales, Real Sports, Star Detective, the science fiction magazine Marvel Science Stories and the jungle-adventure title Ka-Zar, starring its Tarzan-like namesake. These were published under a variety of names, all owned by Goodman and sometimes marked as "Red Circle".

In 1937, returning from his honeymoon in Europe, Goodman and his wife had tickets on the Hindenburg, but were unable to secure seats together, so they took alternative transportation instead, avoiding the Hindenburg disaster.

In 1939, with the emerging medium of comic books proving hugely popular, and the first superheroes setting the trend, Goodman contracted with newly formed comic book packager Funnies, Inc. to supply material for a test comic book, Marvel Comics #1, cover-dated October 1939 and published by his newly formed Timely Publications. It featured the first appearances of the hit characters the Human Torch and the Sub-Mariner, and quickly sold out 80,000 copies. Goodman produced a second printing, cover-dated November 1939, that then sold an approximate 800,000 copies. With a hit on his hands, Goodman began assembling an in-house staff, hiring Funnies, Inc. writer-artist Joe Simon as editor, and Timely's first official employee. Goodman then formed Timely Comics, Inc., beginning with comics cover-dated April 1941 or Spring 1941. Timely Comics became the umbrella name for the several paper corporations that comprised Goodman's comic-book division, which in ensuing decades would evolve into Marvel Comics.

Marvel Comics #1 (Oct. 1939), featuring the Human Torch. Art by Frank R. Paul.

In 1941, Timely published its third major character, the patriotic superhero Captain America by Simon and artist Jack Kirby. The success of Captain America #1 (March 1941) led to an expansion of staff, with Simon bringing freelancer Kirby on staff and subsequently hiring inker Syd Shores "to be Timely's third employee." Simon and Kirby departed Timely after 10 issues of Captain America, and Goodman appointed his wife’s cousin, Stan Lee, already there as an editorial assistant, as Timely's editor, a position Lee would hold for decades.

With the post-war lessening of interest in superheroes, Goodman established a pattern of directing Lee to follow a variety of genres as the market seemed to trend, such as romance in 1948, horror in 1951, Westerns in 1955 and Kaiju monsters in 1958. He could be highly derivative In this regard, such as ordering the title character of Patsy Walker, America's #1 Teenager to have similar crosshatching in her hair as that of Archie Comics' popular Archie Andrews.

The name "Timely Comics" went into disuse after Goodman began using the globe logo of the newsstand-distribution company he owned, Atlas, starting with the covers of comic books dated November 1951. This united a line put out by the same publisher, staff and freelancers through 59 shell companies, from Animirth Comics to Zenith Publications. Throughout the 1950s, the company formerly known as Timely was called Atlas Comics.

=== Red Circle ===
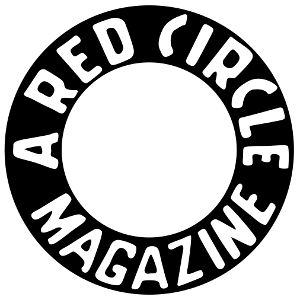
The Red Circle Magazine logo

Goodman, whose business strategy involved using several corporate names for various publishing ventures, sometimes attempted branding his line with the logo "Red Circle," which comics historian Les Daniels calls "a halfhearted attempt to establish an identity for what was usually described loosely as 'the Goodman group' ... a red disk surrounded by a black ring that bore the phrase 'A Red Circle Magazine.' But it appeared only intermittently, when someone remembered to put it on [a pulp magazine's] cover. Historian Jess Nevins, conversely, writes that, "Timely Publications [was how] Goodman's group [of companies] had become known; before this, it was known as 'Red Circle' because of the logo that Goodman had put on his pulp magazines. ... " The Grand Comics Database identifies 21 Goodman comic books from 1944 to 1959 with Red Circle, Inc. branding, and one 1948 comic under Red Circle Magazines Corp.

=== Magazine Management and Lion Books ===
As the market for pulp magazines waned, Goodman, in addition to comic books, transitioned to conventional magazines—published through a concern dubbed Magazine Management Company at least as far back as 1947—and in 1949 founded Lion Books, a paperback line. Goodman used the name Red Circle Books for the first seven titles plus an additional two later. Most were novels, but there was a smattering of mostly sports-oriented nonfiction. Goodman eventually developed two lines, the 25¢ Lion and the 35¢ Lion Library.

The August 5, 1957 issue of Publishers Weekly contained a notice on page 32 of the proposed sale of Lion Books to New American Library, but the sale was never completed. The "Summer 1957 Book Index" in the May 27, 1957 issue included 30 titles to be published by Lion between May and September of 1957, but Goodman ceased publication with the April 1957 titles. Most of the forecast titles eventually appeared between 1957 and 1959 as paperbacks from other publishers, including Signet, Pyramid Books, and Zenith Books.

Authors that Lion published included such notables as Robert Bloch, David Goodis and Jim Thompson. The first Lion editor was Arnold Hano.

=== Marvel Comics ===
In mid-1961, following rival DC Comics's successful revival of superheroes a few years earlier, Goodman assigned his comics editor, Stan Lee, to follow the trend again. He said, "Stan, we gotta put out a bunch of heroes. You know, there's a market for it." Lee's wife suggested that Lee experiment with stories he preferred, since he was planning on changing careers and had nothing to lose. In response, Lee and artist Jack Kirby created The Fantastic Four #1 (cover-dated Nov. 1961), giving their superheroes a flawed humanity in which they bickered, worried about money and behaved more like everyday people than noble archetypes. That series became the first major success of what would become Marvel Comics. The newly naturalistic comics changed the industry. Lee, Kirby, such artists as Steve Ditko, Don Heck, Dick Ayers, John Romita Sr., Gene Colan, and John Buscema, and eventually writers including Roy Thomas and Archie Goodwin, ushered in a string of hit characters, including Spider-Man, Iron Man, the Hulk, Daredevil, and the X-Men.

In fall 1968, Goodman sold Magazine Management to the Perfect Film & Chemical Corporation. Goodman remained as publisher until 1972, which included supporting Lee's decision to disregard the Comics Code Authority's disallowance of an anti-drug themed story-arc featured in The Amazing Spider-Man requested by the US Department of Health, Education and Welfare, which discredited the censor. Two years later he founded a new comics company, Seaboard Periodicals, which published under a new Atlas Comics imprint and is known to collectors as "Atlas/Seaboard Comics". It shut down the following year.

Perfect Film & Chemical renamed itself Cadence Industries in 1973, the first of many post-Goodman changes, mergers, and acquisitions that led to what became the 21st-century corporation Marvel Entertainment Group.

=== Men's magazines ===
Goodman's Magazine Management Company also published such men's adventure magazines as Bachelor, For Men Only, Male, Stag and Swank, edited during the 1950s by Noah Sarlat. As well, there was such ephemera as a one-shot black-and-white "nudie cutie" comic, The Adventures of Pussycat (Oct. 1968), that reprinted some stories of the sexy, tongue-in-cheek secret-agent strip that ran in some of his men's magazines. Marvel/Atlas writers Stan Lee, Larry Lieber and Ernie Hart and artists Wally Wood, Al Hartley, Jim Mooney and Bill Everett and "good girl art" cartoonist Bill Ward contributed.

By the late 1960s, these titles had begun evolving into erotic magazines, with pictorials about dancers and swimsuit models replaced by bikinis and discreet nude shots, with gradually fewer fiction stories.

Another division, Humorama, published digest-sized magazines of girlie cartoons by Ward, Bill Wenzel and Archie Comics great Dan De Carlo, as well as black-and-white photos of pin-up models including Bettie Page, Eve Meyer, stripper Lili St. Cyr and actresses Joi Lansing, Tina Louise, Irish McCalla, Julie Newmar and others. Titles included Breezy, Gaze, Gee-Whiz, Joker, Stare, and Snappy. They were published from at least the mid-1950s to mid-1960s.

In addition to men's adventure magazines and Humorama, Goodman also published many other magazines covering a plethora of topics including several male-oriented glossy 5" × 7" digests in the early to mid-1950s (e.g. Focus, Photo, and Eye) prior to the development of Humorama, as well as many romance, film and television, sports and other general interest magazines spanning several decades.

=== Personal life ===
Goodman was married to Jean Davis, with whom he had three children. He died on June 6, 1992, at his home in Palm Beach, Florida, aged 84.

== Goodman's magazines ==
=== Pulp magazines ===
- Adventure Trails
- All Baseball Stories
- All Basketball Stories
- All Football Stories
- All Star Detective Stories
- All Star Fiction / All Star Adventure Fiction / All Star Adventure Magazine
- American Sky Devils
- The Angel Detective
- Best Detective
- Best Love Magazine
- Best Sports Magazine
- Best Western / Best Western Novels
- Big Baseball Stories
- Big Book Sports
- Big Sports Magazine
- Children's Book Digest
- Complete Adventure Magazine
- Complete Detective
- Complete Sports / Complete Sports Action Stories for Men
- Complete War Novels
- Complete Western Book Magazine
- Cowboy Action Novels
- Detective Mysteries
- Detective Short Stories
- Dynamic Science Stories
- Five Western Novels
- Gunsmoke Western
- Justice (digest)
- Ka-Zar / Ka-Zar the Great
- Marvel Science Stories / Marvel Tales /
  Marvel Stories / Marvel Science Fiction
- Masked Rider Western (later sold to Thrilling)
- Modern Love
- Modern Love Stories
- Mystery Tales
- Quick Trigger Western Novels Magazine
- Ranch Love Stories
- Real Confessions
- Real Love
- Real Mystery Magazine / Real Mystery
- Real Sports
- Romantic Short Stories
- Secret Story
- Six-Gun Western
- Sky Devils
- Sports Action
- Sports Leaders Magazine
- Sports Short Stories
- Star Detective Magazine
- Star Sports Magazine
- 3-Book Western (digest)
- Three Western Novels / Three Western Novels Magazine
- Top-Notch Detective
- Top-Notch Western
- True Crime / True Crime Magazine
- Two Daring Love Novels
- Two-Gun Western Novels Magazine / Two-Gun Western /
  Two-Gun Western Novels / 2-Gun Western
- Uncanny Stories
- Uncanny Tales
- War Stories Magazine
- Western Fiction Magazine / Western Fiction Monthly / Western Fiction
- Western Magazine (Digest)
- Western Novelettes
- Western Short Stories
- Western Supernovel
- Wild West Stories & Complete Novel Magazine
- Wild Western Novels / Wild Western Novels Magazine

=== Romance and true crime magazines ===
- My Confession
- My Romance
- True Secrets

=== Humor magazines ===
- Best Cartoons from the Editors of Male & Stag, Magazine Management: published at least from 1973 to 1975)
- Cartoon Capers: published at least from vol. 4, #2 (1969) to vol. 10, #3 (1975)
- Cartoon Laughs: confirmed extant: vol 12, #3 (1973)

=== Men's-adventure and erotic magazines ===
Launched pre-1970

- Bachelor initially titled Men in Adventure 1959
- For Men Only: confirmed at least from vol. 4, #11 (Dec. 1957) through at least vol. 26, #3 (March 1976)

Published by Canam Publishers (at least 1957), Newsstand Publications Inc. (at least 1966–1967), Perfect Film Inc. (at least 1968), Magazine Management Co. Inc. (at least 1970)

- Male: published at least vol. 1, #2 (July 1950) through 1977
- Stag: at least 314 issues published February 1942 – February 1976

Published by Official Communications Inc. (1951), Official Magazines (Feb. 1952 - March 1958), Atlas (July 1958 - Oct. 1968), Magazine Management (Dec. 1970 to end)

- Stag Annual: at least 18 issues published 1964–1975

Published by Atlas (1964–1968), Magazine Management (1970–1975)

- Swank

1970s and later

- FILM International: covering X-rated movies

=== True crime magazines ===
- Action Life Magazine: published at least volume 4, #4 (Nov. 1954), Atlas Magazine Pub.
- Complete Detective Cases: published at least between March 1941 and Fall 1954, Postal Pub. Inc.
- Leading Detective Cases: published at least May 1947, Zenith Pub. Corp.
- National Detective Cases: published at least March 1941.

=== Movie magazines ===
- Screen Stars: published at least October 1944.

=== Other magazines ===
- Celebrity: extant in at least 1977
- It's Amazing: issue #1 dated only 1949, published by Stadium Publishing.
- Movie World
- Popular Digest: volume 1 #1, September 1939.
- Sex Health: issue #1 dated August 1937.

== Notes ==
Preceded by n/a	Publisher of Marvel Comics; 1939–1972	Succeeded by Stan Lee
Preceded by n/a	Publisher of Magazine Management; 1947–1972	Succeeded by n/a
Preceded by n/a	Publisher of Atlas/Seaboard Comics; 1974–1975	Succeeded by n/a
