= Dragonlance (comics) =

Publication information
- Publisher: DC Comics
- Schedule: Monthly
- Format: Ongoing series
- Publication date: August 1988 – September 1991
- No. of issues: 34 issues

Creative team
- Created by: Dan Mishkin, Ron Randall

Dragonlance is a comic book that was produced by DC Comics under license from TSR. It featured new characters and stories in the world of Krynn, with appearances by some of the original characters from the Dragonlance books. The stories take place prior to the events of Dragons of Autumn Twilight.

== Publication history ==
From 1988 - 1991, DC Comics published several licensed D&D comics, including Advanced Dungeons & Dragons, Dragonlance, Forgotten Realms, and Spelljammer. Dragonlance was first to be licensed and published with its first issue hitting the stands in August 1988.

Dan Mishkin was the primary writer for the Dragonlance (1988–1991) comic. Mishkin wrote issues #1-20, 22–25, and 28 (1988–1991), and Jack C. Harris also worked on issue #28 (1991).

Ron Randall illustrated issues #1-13, 16–19, 22–27, 30-32 (1988–1991); other artists on the series include Dave Hoover on issue #20 (1990), Alan Kupperberg, and Dave Simons. In 1989, Tony DeZuniga illustrated The DragonLance Saga Book Three, written by Roy Thomas.

Elliot S. Maggin served as an editor for DC from 1989 to 1991 and oversaw the licensed TSR titles, including Dragonlance. Kim Yale served as an editor for DC from 1991 to 1993 and oversaw their licensed titles.

The comic ran for 34 issues, ending in September 1991.

== Characters ==
=== Main characters ===
Sturm Brightblade
Human Knight of Solamnia

Vandar Brightblade
Human Knight, and uncle of Sturm

Riva Silvercrown
Human Knight

Raistlin Majere
Human Magic User

Kalthanan
Dark Elf

Gnatch
Gnome

=== Minor characters ===
Kitiara uth Matar
Human warrior

Tanis Half-Elven
Half-elf warrior
