= Dan Mishkin =

American writer

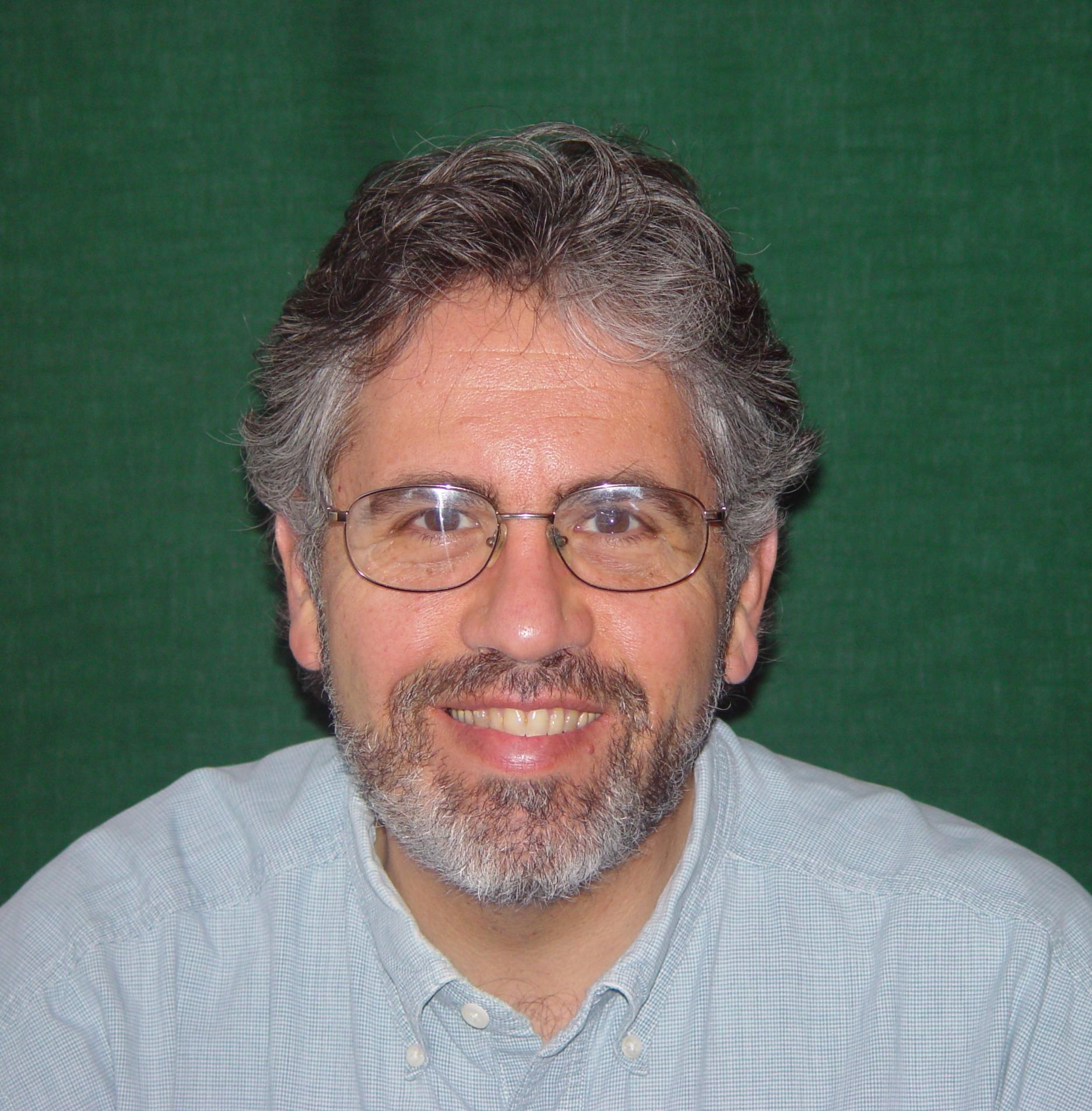
- Mishkin in February 2008
- Born: March 3, 1953 (age 73)
- Area: Writer
- Notable works: Amethyst, Princess of Gemworld; Blue Devil; Wonder Woman

Dan Mishkin (born March 3, 1953) is an American comic book writer, and co-creator (with Gary Cohn) of the DC Comics characters Amethyst, Princess of Gemworld and Blue Devil.

== Early life ==
As an adolescent, Dan Mishkin formed a writing partnership with Gary Cohn. Mishkin recounted:

We met in junior high school and we were part of a small crowd of good friends, who are still friends to this day. We talked and loved comic books and had a lot of other interests. At one point, when we were 16, Gary said, 'I'm going to be a writer.' ... my thought was, 'I didn't know you were allowed to say that!' It was a real eye-opening experience for me, because Gary kind of led the way and said, 'If you're the sort of person who is always thinking of and telling stories, you can make this your life's work.'

== Career ==
Mishkin and Cohn entered the comics industry together following a correspondence with Jack C. Harris, an editor at DC Comics. Their first work for the company was the three-page short story "On the Day of His Return" published in Time Warp #3 (February–March 1980) and drawn by Steve Ditko. They wrote several stories for various mystery titles as well as the "OMAC" backup in The Warlord. In 1983, Mishkin, Cohn and artist Ernie Colón created Amethyst, Princess of Gemworld. The following year, the writing team and Paris Cullins introduced Blue Devil. DC gave both series a promotional push by featuring them in free, 16-page insert previews. Among other work, Mishkin had a run on Wonder Woman from 1982 through 1985 with artists Gene Colan and Don Heck. Mishkin and Colan reintroduced the character Circe to the rogues gallery of Wonder Woman's adversaries. He was one of the contributors to the DC Challenge limited series in 1986. Mishkin and Jeff Grubb authored the Advanced Dungeons & Dragons (1988–1991) and Forgotten Realms (1989–1991) comic books, and Mishkin also wrote a Dragonlance (1988–1991) comic. In 2001, he worked with artist Tom Mandrake on the short lived series Creeps and in 2006 on the children's book The Forest King: Woodlark's Shadow. Mishkin organized the "Kids Read Comics" convention in Chelsea, Michigan in June 2009. Mishkin and Ernie Colón collaborated on The Warren Commission Report: A Graphic Investigation Into the Kennedy Assassination in 2014.

== Bibliography ==
=== DC Comics ===
- Advanced Dungeons and Dragons #5–8, 13–36, Annual #1 (1989–1991)
- Amethyst, Princess of Gemworld #1–12, Annual #1 (1983–1984)
- Amethyst vol. 2 #1–8 (1985)
- Aquaman Special #1 (1988)
- The Best of DC #35, 52, 61, 71 (1983–1986)
- Blue Devil #1–10, 12–28, 30–31, Annual #1 (1984–1986)
- The Brave and the Bold #186, 191 (1982)
- DC Challenge #10, 12 (1986)
- DC Comics Presents #48, 50–51, 53, 57, 62–63, 74, 76, 96 (1982–1986)
- DC Sampler #1 (1983)
- Dragonlance #1–20, 22–25, 28 (1988–1991)
- The Flash #306 (1982)
- The Fury of Firestorm #24 (Blue Devil preview) (1984)
- Ghosts #109, 111 (1982)
- Green Lantern vol. 2 #152–153 (1982)
- Hawkman vol. 2 #8–17 (1987)
- Heroes Against Hunger #1 (1986)
- House of Mystery #295–296, 299–303, 310–319, 321 (1981–1983)
- Jonah Hex #53–56 (1981–1982)
- Justice League America Annual #6 (1992)
- Justice League of America Annual #3 (1985)
- Legends of the Dark Knight 100-Page Super Spectacular #1 (2014)
- Legion of Super-Heroes vol. 2 #298 (Amethyst preview) (1983)
- Mystery in Space #114, 116 (1980–1981)
- The New Adventures of Superboy #31 (1982)
- The Saga of the Swamp Thing #14–15 (1983)
- Secret Origins vol. 2 #10, 13, 24, 41 (1987–1989)
- Secrets of Haunted House #42, 44 (1981–1982)
- Showcase '93 #1–6 (Blue Devil) (1993)
- Star Trek #51 (1993)
- Teen Titans Spotlight #18 (Aqualad) (1988)
- Time Warp #3 (1980)
- TSR Worlds Annual #1 (1990)
- The Unexpected #214, 216–217 (1981)
- The Warlord #42–47 (OMAC backup stories) (1981)
- Weird War Tales #95, 101–102, 107, 122–123 (1981–1983)
- Wonder Woman #295–317, 319–325 (1982–1985)
- World's Finest Comics #301 (1984)

==== Collected editions ====
- Showcase Presents: Amethyst, Princess of Gemworld (collects Legion of Super-Heroes #298, the original Amethyst, Princess of Gemworld 12–issue limited series, Amethyst Annual #1, DC Comics Presents #63, and Amethyst #1–11 ongoing series, 648 pages, September 2012, ISBN 1401236774)

=== Marvel Comics ===
- Marvel Comics Presents #44 (Puma), 74 (Human Torch and Iceman) (1990–1991)
- Marvel Fanfare #53 (Iron Man) (1990)
- Marvel Super-Heroes vol. 2 #5 (Doctor Strange) (1991)
- Solo Avengers #6 (Falcon) (1988)
