= Advanced Dungeons & Dragons (comic) =

Comic book series based on tabletop RPG

Publication information
- Publisher: DC Comics
- Schedule: Monthly
- Format: Ongoing series
- Publication date: September 1988 – September 1991
- No. of issues: 36 issues

Creative team
- Created by: Jeff Grubb, Rags Morales

Advanced Dungeons & Dragons is a comic book that was produced by DC Comics under license from TSR.

== Publication history ==
From 1988 to 1991, DC Comics published several licensed D&D comics, including Advanced Dungeons & Dragons, Dragonlance, Forgotten Realms, and Spelljammer. Advanced Dungeons & Dragons debuted in October 1988, after the Dragonlance series.

Dan Mishkin was the primary author during the title's three-year run.

Creator Jeff Grubb also wrote four fill-in issues. Michael Fleisher also wrote for the series. Jan Duursema was the primary artist for the comic book series for three years. Duursema drew issues #1-22, 24–30, 33–36, and Annual #1 (1988–91), while Ron Randall also provided artwork for issue #8, and Tom Mandrake illustrated issues ##23, 31–32, and Annual #1 (1990–1991).

Elliot S. Maggin served as an editor for DC from 1989 to 1991 and oversaw the licensed TSR titles, including Advanced Dungeons & Dragons.

In October 1991, the TSR license expired, with Advanced Dungeons & Dragons ending at issue #36.

== Plot ==
The series follows the exploits of a group of adventurers in the Forgotten Realms city of Mystra. The main arc is broken into shorter stories 2-4 issues long.

The Gathering. #1-4
An ancient evil rises and threatens the Realms, only a motley band of adventurers can stop it.

The Spirit of Myrrth. #5-8
The party investigates the Jester's Guild in Waterdeep, and confronts the spirit of a long dead Jester King.

Catspaw. #9-12
Timoth the Centaur takes a job as a courier. His first assignment draws the attention of Waterdeep's organized crime, headed by Xanathar the Beholder.

Spell Games. #13-16
Vajra confronts her past as a slave and gladiator in the Arena of Blood. Meanwhile, a boy under Connor's protection is kidnapped.

Kyriani's Story. #17-18
The story of Priam's half-sister (and half-elf): Kyriani.

Phases of the Moon. #19-22
Selune, goddess of the moon, has arrived at Waterdeep. Ties in with the Avatar novels by Richard Awlinson.

Lawyers! #23
Onyx the dwarf owes a debt to the mysterious Lawyers and not even the mighty wizard Khelben and the Lord of Waterdeep himself, Peirgeiron, may be able to help him.

Scavengers. #24-26
After a vicious battle with a band of savage orcs, Timoth is badly wounded and will die soon if he cannot reach a healer. Vajra, also wounded, must somehow trek through the merciless blizzard with her centaur friend in tow if they are to survive to fight another day.

Death and the Dragon's Eye. #27-30
Kyriani is on the run from the law, accused of a murder she did not commit.

Pillar of Gold. #31-32
Onyx the Invincible is reunited with his long thought dead father. They embark on a quest to unearth a lost treasure said to be located somewhere in the bowels below Waterdeep.

Summer in the City. #33
When the warrior, Vajra, and the centaur, Timoth, engage in a friendly arm-wrestling bout the stakes become even greater than anyone could have hoped to realize.

Rites and Wrongs. #34-36
Conner returns to Waterdeep with the scam to end all scams. Against her friends' better judgement, Vajra embarks on this one last quest with the rogue who has both betrayed and saved her life time and again. Timoth and Onyx mount a desperate rescue attempt to save Kyri.

== Characters ==
=== Main characters ===
Priam Agrivar
A human paladin with a past addiction to alcohol.

Vajra Valmey Jar
A female human fighter and former slave gladiator, who survived the Manshaka Arena of Blood.

Onyx the Invincible
Male dwarf fighter/thief and best friend of Timoth.

Timoth Eyesbright
Male centaur fighter and friend of Onyx.

Cyriana of Shadowdale
Half-Elf magic user.

Connor
Human rogue with a shady past.

=== Other characters ===
Kyriani
Female half-elf/half-drow, half sister to Priam.

Khelben "Blackstaff" Arunsun
He appeared in the Advanced Dungeons & Dragons comic book as a friend, ally and occasional manipulator of the Waterdeep-based main characters.

Selûne
Minor goddess, she appeared as a supporting character in the series, masquerading as "Luna", the proprietor of an inn called "Selune's Smile". Appearing mostly as a background character and occasional deus ex machina for the main story, her true identity was eventually discovered by all of the series' primary characters. In the series' finale, Luna fully reclaimed her godly might (hidden behind an attic door within "Selune's Smile"), and ascended to the realms of the gods, bequeathing ownership of her inn to one of the series' leads.
