= Dave Simons =

American comic book artist

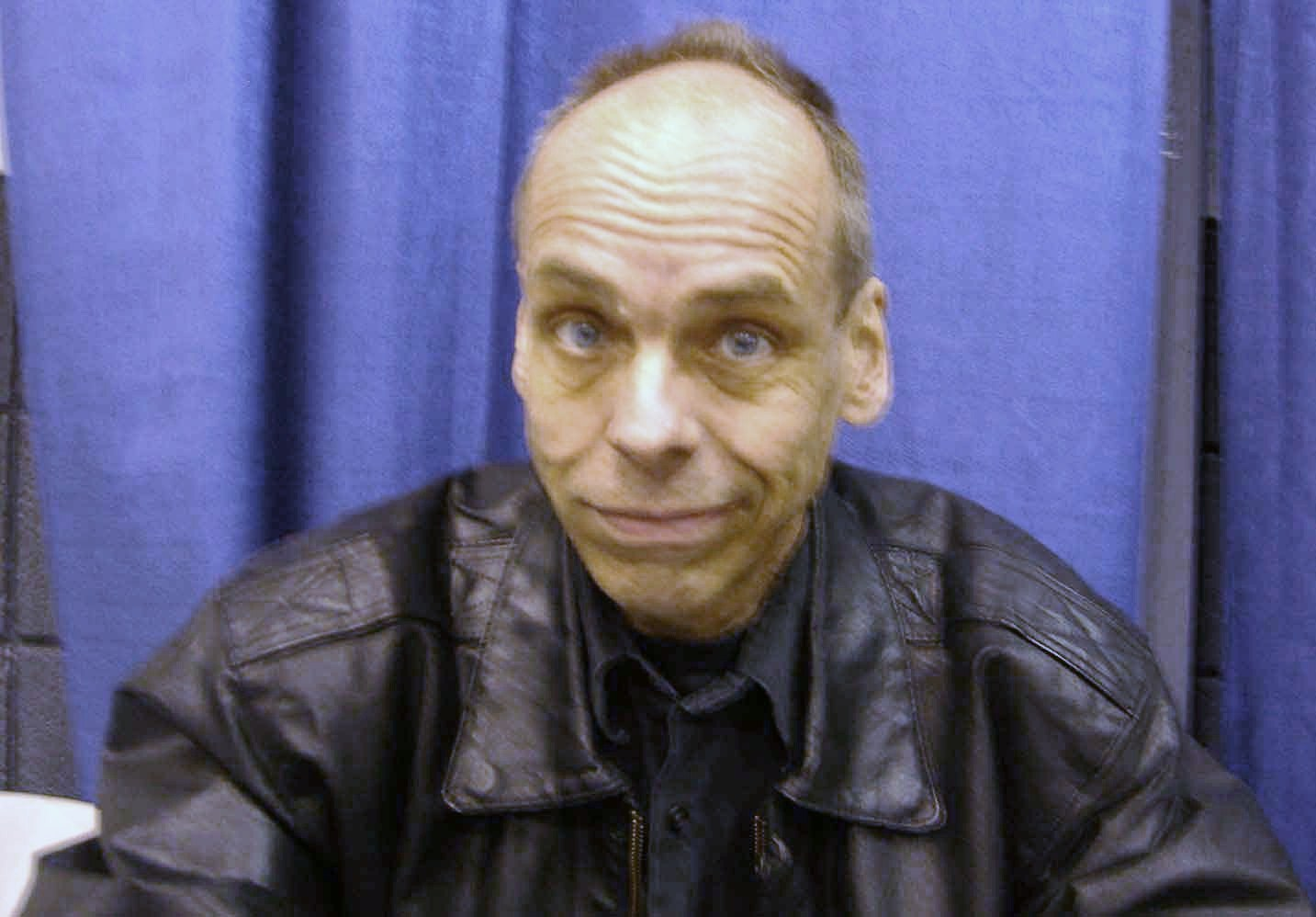
- Born: December 20, 1954
- Died: June 9, 2009 (age 54) New York City
- Areas: Cartoonist, Writer, Penciller, Inker, Editor, Colourist
- Notable works: Ghost Rider, Conan the Barbarian, Forgotten Realms, Courage the Cowardly Dog
- Awards: Inkwell Awards Stacey Aragon Special Recognition Award (2023)

Dave Simons (December 20, 1954 – June 9, 2009) was an American comic book artist known for his work on Conan, Ghost Rider, Red Sonja, and Spider-Man for Marvel Comics and Forgotten Realms for DC Comics. He is also known for commercial storyboard and games artwork work on The Secret Files of the Spy Dogs and Greyhawk Ruins.

== Early life ==
Dave Simons stated that he had always wanted to be a comic book artist. "I always wanted to do comics since I was about eight years old ... so I started making a point of drawing something every day. I figured if I just kept doing that, then eventually I'd get better at it."

After a stint in the United States Coast Guard, and a chance series of meetings with Frank Robbins, Simons elected to undertake formal training to be an artist. As part of his education Simons attended the art workshops run by Marvel Comics artist John Buscema. It was while attending these classes that he became friends with future comic book artists Ken Landgraf and Armando Gil.

It was through Landgraf that Simons produced his first published work, which consisted of mainly commercial illustrations and the occasional soft-core pornographic comic book.

== Career ==
=== Marvel Comics ===
Approaching then-Marvel editor Rick Marschall at a convention in the late 1970s, Simons was able to get his samples seen and assessed. At the time Marschall was overseeing the Curtis Magazines line for Marvel, and Simons was duly assigned the duty of inking the first issue of the Howard the Duck magazine. After submitting the story Simons was assigned a fill-in Falcon story, which he inked with the assistance of Armando Gil over Sal Buscema's pencils. This marked his first professional work for Marvel and in mainstream comic books.

Simons was then assigned both pencilling and inking jobs for Marvel. One of the artists whose pencils he inked was Gene Colan. "Gene Colan was always my favorite penciler to work on ... [T]hat was like a match made in heaven because a lot of people didn't understand Gene's shading. I thought, 'this is great, this is a great jumping on point if you're gonna do black and white stuff". Simons' attention to detail came into high demand in the 1980s and his inking credits include artists such as Keith Pollard, Ron Wilson, Frank Miller, John Buscema, Marc Silvestri, Greg LaRocque, John Romita Jr and Ed Hannigan. Titles that featured his inking include Thor, The Thing, Marvel Premiere, Night Thrasher, Iron Man, King Conan, Doctor Strange, Star Wars, Star Trek, ThunderCats and others.

Simons's tenure at Marvel was not limited to inking. He proved himself to be a very capable penciler and his pencils and ink combination were featured in titles such as The Spectacular Spider-Man, Team America, What If, Marvel Comics Presents, Bizarre Adventures, Red Sonja, Web of Spider-Man, and King Conan. He also provided cover art to titles such as Power Man and Iron Fist, Ghost Rider, Darkhold, Machine Man, Kull the Conqueror, Marvel Team-Up, Marvel Two-in-One, Crystar, Moon Knight and many others, along with pin-ups for the black and white magazine Savage Sword of Conan. "Pencilling, if you're doing it right ... is a much tougher gig than inking. Even though I usually liked to know what was going on, with inking you don't necessarily have to be involved with the story. With pencilling you have to be intimately involved with the story because you're the one who's bringing the writers work and intentions across to the readers, as to what he's trying to communicate there. You have to think of the drama, the camera angles, and the composition, make sure you leave room for the word balloons, all those sorts of things".

==== Ghost Rider ====
Simons' best known Marvel work was his run on the second series of Ghost Rider. His run on the title saw him first inking veteran artist Don Perlin before joining with Bob Budiansky to create one of the best remembered runs of the characters history. Budiansky and Simons worked with writers Roger Stern and J.M. DeMatteis. "The only speed bump we hit in this whole thing was when Simons, who of that team is the unsung hero, left", Budiansky recalled. "He used to come to the office dressed in leather. I mean, this was not an act, he'd come dressed in one of these black leather, zipper jackets. I don't know if he also wore leather pants. He might have worn them. But anyway, the point is, he knew how to ink leather, which was really important for Ghost Rider. So when he left the book we never really were able to replace that look that he gave the book. The rest of the team was all somewhat saddened by his departure."

=== DC Comics ===
In the 1990s, Simons left Marvel and crossed companies to DC Comics. At DC, he worked on Deathstroke The Terminator, Spelljammer, Dragonlance, and Forgotten Realms. "I liked the combination of me and Rags Morales ... [H]e has that Frazetta thing going on and I was hip to that and tried to bring that out a lot." Simons worked on a number of cartoon-based books during his time at DC and his work is featured in titles such as Cartoon Network Block Party. During this time he also illustrated Roger Rabbit at Disney Comics.

=== Dungeons & Dragons ===
Simons also worked for TSR on books such as Otherlands (1990), Greyhawk Ruins (1990), Tales of the Lance (1992), DMR2: Creature Catalog (1993), Monstrous Manual (1993), The Knight of Newts (1993), and The Created (1993).

=== Animation career ===
In the late 1990s, Simons left the comic book industry and moved into animation. As an artist he provided storyboards to such shows as Captain Planet, Exo-Squad,He-Man and the Masters of the Universe, Zula Patrol, Psi-Kix and Maya and Miguel. "The list of shows I've worked on is certainly longer than the list of comic books that I've worked on at this point", Simons once commented Simons also storyboarded for the show Spy Dogs, which was directed by Will Meugniot and later, Mike Joens. Simons worked again with Gil on this show, hiring him as a storyboard artist. Simons has the distinction of working on both an animated TV program and the comic book spin-off at the same time, this was when he worked on the animated show Courage the Cowardly Dog, which he subsequently drew the DC Comics comic book of the same name.

=== Post-animation ===
Simons also created characters. He developed Beastball Saga, with Sebastian Mondrone. He was also developing a new character, Donna Thyme, with writer Daniel Best. Simons' last comic book work was on the book Army of Darkness, along with contributing art to various trading card sets issued by Rittenhouse. He contributed art for Dynamic Forces and Red Sonja, variant cover series and the 100 Hulks project.

In December 2008 Simons accepted a seat on the committee for the Inkwell Awards, and remained a member until his death. He posthumously holds the title of Inkwell Awards Committee Member Emeritus Ad Infinitum. The Inkwell Awards created an annual scholarship, for the Joe Kubert School of Cartoon and Graphic Art in his name. In 2023, he was posthumously awarded the Inkwell Awards SASRA (Stacey Aragon Special Recognition Award).

=== Death ===
Dave Simons died on June 9, 2009, at the age of 54, following a long battle with cancer.
