= Spelljammer (comics) =

Comic series based on role-playing game

Cover of first issue, artwork by Mike Collins.

Spelljammer is a licensed comic book series published by DC Comics starting in 1990 that is based on the fantasy role-playing game Dungeons & Dragons, specifically the steampunk campaign world Spelljammer created by TSR.

== Publication history ==
From 1988 to 1991, DC Comics published several licensed D&D comics, including Advanced Dungeons & Dragons, Dragonlance, and Forgotten Realms. In July 1990, DC produced TSR Worlds Annual #1, which featured chapters devoted to various TSR campaign worlds. The Spelljammer chapter featured a story that would be picked up in the first issue of the Spelljammer comic, published a month later.

A variety of writers worked on the series:

- Issues #1–8: Barbara Kesel
- Issue #9: Jeff Grubb
- Issue #10: Don Kraar
- Issue #11: Barbara Kesel & Adam Blaustein
- Issue #12–13: Adam Blaustein
- Issue #14–15: Don Kraar

The creative team for the first seven issues featured penciller Mike Collins, inker Dan Panosian, letterer Steve Haynie, and colorist Eric Kachelhofer.

Joe Quesada illustrated issues #8–13, and #15, and Don Heck's final DC work was penciling and inking over Quesada's layouts for Spelljammer #11. Dave Simons also provided artwork for the title.

Elliot S! Maggin served as an editor for DC from 1989 to 1991 and oversaw the licensed TSR titles, including Spelljammer.

In 1991, TSR decided to create their own comic books for product lines not covered by their agreement with DC Comics. This was not well received by DC Comics, and in November 1991, DC abruptly ended production of all TSR comics lines.

This abruptly brought the Spelljammer line to a close after 15 issues with several storylines unfinished.

== Plotline ==
In addition to the swords & sorcery usually found in D&D, the Spelljammer campaign world also includes sentient spaceships crewed by various races of adventurers that travel from world to world.

The storyline of the series mainly revolves around the captain of a spelljamming ship, Meredith — formerly a wizard named Nimone — although several issues focus on her son Bors, and some leave the Meredith/Bors storylines altogether.

=== Issue #1 ===
- Title: Journey's Song: Kirstig's Tale
- Writer: Barbara Kesel

Captain Meredith lands her spelljamming vessel Rogue Ship on a desert planet and meets the local leader, Father Pax. A rebellion breaks out. Meredith makes it back to her ship but falls unconscious in the cockpit. Father Pax, the good priestess Jasmine, and Tember try to open the cockpit unsuccessfully. When Meredith awakes, she has just enough energy to launch the ship into space, unwittingly taking the three desert natives with her into space.

=== Issue #2 ===
- Title: The Rogue Ship, Part 2
- Writer: Barbara Kesel

Father Pax, Jasmine and Tember manage to free Meredith from the cockpit and wake her up, but she is not in any condition to pilot the ship. Evil mindspiders called Neogi attack Rogue Ship and send umber hulks to take over the ship. The crew manage to fight off the invaders. Rogue Ship consents to allow Father Pax to pilot it, but the ship ends up in a Neogi-infested asteroid belt.

=== Issue #3 ===
- Title: The Rogue Ship, Part 3
- Writer: Barbara Kesel

The ship takes Father Pax to his homeworld of Unipaxala, but find it besieged by Neogi mindspiders. Rogue Ship changes its shape to resemble a deathspider to evade the Neogi. After landing, the crew sneaks through secret tunnels to the Ice Ring Projector that will save the planet, but they are betrayed.

=== Issue #4 ===
- Title: The Rogue Ship, Part Four: Song's End, Tale's Beginning
- Writer: Barbara Kesel

While most of the crew attempt to get closer to the Ice Ring Projector, Jasmine battles the Neogi's umber hulks. She meets up with the rest of the crew, and Tember activates the projector, sealing the planet off from the Neogi. The crew return to Rogue Ship and head off into space.

=== Issue #5 ===
- Title: Trial by Wildfyre
- Writer: Barbara Kesel

On the jungle world Boroda, humans led by Meredith's son Bors fight a deadly Oxenbar monster. Rogue Ship arrives in time to help slay the monster. The humans had herded all the planet's monsters into a barricaded valley, but something destroyed the barricade, allowing the monsters to escape. Meredith agrees to help, and also starts to train Tember to be a fighter.

=== Issue #6 ===
- Title: Circle of Fear
- Writer: Barbara Kesel

A group of teenagers from the Boroda village had been deceived by Wildfyre, a red dragon, into thinking it was their friend. They had freed the dragon from the barricaded valley, and Wildfyre then destroyed the barricade, freeing the other monsters. The teenagers convinced Meredith and Bors to leave the village, and Wildfyre then destroyed the undefended village. Bors exiles the teenagers.

=== Issue #7 ===
- Title: Paying the Price
- Writer: Barbara Kesel

Tember seeks out the exiled teenagers to gain access to the red dragon.

=== Issue #8 ===
- Title: Monster
- Writer: Barbara Kesel

Meredith surprises everyone by slaying the red dragon with a magical spell. Bors re-exiles the teenagers until they kill the last three escaped monsters. The good priestess Kirstig confronts Meredith, wanting to know how she can cast spells, but Meredith avoids the question, and Rogue Ship returns to space.

=== Issue #9 ===
- Title: The Geas
- Writer: Jeff Grubb (creator of Spelljammer)

Meredith reveals her back story, when she was a powerful wizard named Nimone who fell under the power of another wizard.

=== Issue #10 ===
- Title: Exile on Taladas
- Writer: Don Kraar

A spelljammer captain lands on Krynn, and during a fight he meets a woman. After the fight, tells her the story of how he met Nimone (Captain Meredith).

This is done in a non-traditional style, each page filled with blocks of prose and a single illustration.

=== Issue #11 ===
- Title: Serious Trouble!
- Writer: Barbara Kesel & Adam Blaustein

Meredith steers the ship into a field of stone golems. Some crew members, including Jasmine, get thrown into Wild Space, but the ship escapes. Meredith wants to give the ship a chance to calm down before returning for the crew members, and lands at a dwarven citadel, one that she had robbed when she was a pirate. The dwarves capture her, but the good priestess Kirstig, despite her misgivings, rescues Meredith. Back on her ship, Meredith obliterates the dwarven citadel, and Kirstig swears she will destroy Meredith for this evil act.

=== Issue #12 ===
- Title: Alone
- Writer: Adam Blaustein

Jasmine, one of the crew members cast into wild space in Issue 10, is captured by the Gith crew of a derelict ship. Back on Rogue Ship, Kirstig tries to talk Meredith into going back for the missing crew members. When Meredith refuses, Kirstig tries to convince the sentient ship to go back. When Meredith finds out, the two women fight it out until Rogue Ship encounters the derelict Gith ship, and Jasmine is rescued.

=== Issue #13 ===
- Title: The Armada
- Writer: Adam Blaustein

Rogue Ship encounters an elven armada led by old acquaintances of Meredith from her wizarding days. When things go sideways, the elven armada is destroyed.

=== Issue #14 ===
- Title: Nimone
- Writer: Don Kraar

Meredith maroons Jasmine in the Mere of Dead Men, but Jasmine is rescued by the archmage Elminster. He tells Jasmine that Meredith is interfering with the cosmic balance, and together, they travel back in the past to witness Meredith as the wizardess Nimone, who with her son Bors, are Wild Space pirates. After a perilous adventure, Bors and Nimone find themselves in the Sea of Lost Ships.

=== Issue #15 ===
- Title: The Song of the Einheriar
- Writer: Don Kraar

On the planet Borada, Meredith's son Bors tells his daughter the story of how he and Nimone/Meredith survived the Sea of Lost Ships.

== Reception ==
Writing for Tome of Treasures, Ralf Toth gave the first issue 4 out of 5 stars, calling it "a promising start". Likewise Toth thought that issues #2-4 were above average, using phrases like "fine Spelljammer comic" and "great story and pure Spelljammer", but Toth felt the series devolved into ordinary fantasy in the next three issues, pointing out that the storylines had "nothing to do with the Spelljammer world". Toth rated many of the last 8 issues as only average.
