= Marvel Comics Presents =

Comic book

- Cover of Marvel Comics Presents vol. 1, #79 (Mar 1991), art by Barry Windsor-Smith

Publication information
- Publisher: Marvel Comics
- Schedule: (vol. 1): Bi-weekly (vol. 2): Monthly
- Format: Ongoing series
- Publication date: (vol. 1); September 1988 – March 1995 (vol. 2); September 2007 – August 2008
- No. of issues: (vol. 1): 175 (vol. 2): 12 (vol. 3): 9

Marvel Comics Presents is an American comic book anthology title that was published in three series by Marvel Comics: from 1988 to 1995; 2007 to 2008; and in 2019.

== Volume 1 ==
The first volume was released on a bi-weekly basis and lasted for 175 issues. Each issue had four eight-page stories, of which generally three were episodes in ongoing serials and one was a standalone story, though many issues featured two standalone stories and some featured only serials. The standalone stories generally featured obscure or little-seen characters from the Marvel Universe, and often featured work by creators previously unpublished in the comics field, including Scott Lobdell (a later X-Men writer), who started work under the editorship of Tom DeFalco.

The original plan was for the lead story to feature different members of the X-Men in solo adventures. The first ten issues featured Wolverine; others featured were Colossus, Cyclops, Havok, and the members of Excalibur, whose solo adventures were incorporated into an 8-part serial bookended by chapters staring the entire team. From issues #38 through #142, a story featuring Wolverine was in every issue of the series. This was due to a mandate from Marvel's sales department, which noticed that sales of the series were always higher for issues in which Wolverine was featured. Particularly notable during this run was "Weapon X" in issues #72–84, which revealed the origin of how Wolverine received his adamantium-laced skeleton and claws, with story and art by Barry Windsor-Smith.

For the first 89 issues the series used wraparound covers which illustrated all four features in each issue, usually but not always with the lead feature on the front and the other three on the back. Starting with issue #90, the Ghost Rider was added to the series as a "co-lead" feature, and the book adopted a "flip-book" format, allowing only the two lead features to appear in the cover illustration, though the other two features usually received cover billing.

Issues #143-146 were wholly devoted to the "Siege of Darkness" crossover, dropping the regular Wolverine feature. Staring with issue #147 Ghost Rider was dropped as well, and from then on until the end of the series Vengeance was the new regular character, while the covers rotated between the various features.

Wolverine once more appeared in features from issues #150 through #155, but this time it was strictly to burn off two inventory stories. Ann Nocenti and Steve Lightle had already started work on a sequel to their acclaimed story "Typhoid's Kiss" from issues #109-116 before Wolverine was dropped as the regular feature, so Vengeance was worked into the story and it was published. Dwight Jon Zimmerman had submitted the plot for the first installment of a sequel to "Sign of the Beast" from issues #62-63, and Paul Ryan had penciled it, but Zimmerman left Marvel without finishing the project. It was shelved for years, but with Zimmerman not returning, it was turned over to writer Nel Yomotov, penciller Phil Hugh Felix, and inker Rey Garcia to finish.

Several of the Wolverine storylines have since been collected and reprinted in trade paperback format. The first volume features Wolverine's first adventures in Madripoor, a fictional island that became Wolverine's second home during the late 1980s.

Other notable highlights include the first appearance of Ramonda, mother to Shuri and step-mother to T'Challa (issue #14), the first appearance of Damage Control (issue #19), a wrestling match between the Hulk and Hulk Hogan (issue #45), the first appearance of Siege (issue #62), the first appearance of Cyber (issue #85, by Peter David and Sam Kieth), and the first meeting of Wolverine and Venom (issue #117).

=== Stories in volume 1 ===
Issue #	A Story	B Story	C Story	D Story
1	Wolverine "Save the Tiger" Chris Claremont and John Buscema Collected in Marvel Comics Presents: Wolverine Vol 1, Wolverine Epic Vol 1: Madripoor Nights, and Wolverine Omnibus Vol 1	Man-Thing "Elements of Terror" Steve Gerber and Tom Sutton Collected in The Man-Thing by Steve Gerber Vol. 3	Shang-Chi "Crossing Lines" Doug Moench and Tom Grindberg Collected in Shang-Chi, Master of Kung-Fu Omnibus Vol. 4	Silver Surfer "...Fear Itself!" Al Milgrom Collected in Silver Surfer Epic Collection: Parable; Silver Surfer: Return to the Spaceways Omnibus
2	Wolverine "Save the Tiger" Chris Claremont and John Buscema Collected in Marvel Comics Presents: Wolverine Vol 1, Wolverine Epic Vol 1: Madripoor Nights, and Wolverine Omnibus Vol 1	Man-Thing "Elements of Terror" Steve Gerber and Tom Sutton Collected in The Man-Thing by Steve Gerber Vol. 3	Shang-Chi "Crossing Lines" Doug Moench and Tom Grindberg Collected in Shang-Chi, Master of Kung-Fu Omnibus Vol. 4	The Captain "Cold War" Al Milgrom
3	Wolverine "Save the Tiger" Chris Claremont and John Buscema Collected in Marvel Comics Presents: Wolverine Vol 1, Wolverine Epic Vol 1: Madripoor Nights, and Wolverine Omnibus Vol 1	Man-Thing "Elements of Terror" Steve Gerber and Tom Sutton Collected in The Man-Thing by Steve Gerber Vol. 3	Shang-Chi "Crossing Lines" Doug Moench and Tom Grindberg Collected in Shang-Chi, Master of Kung-Fu Omnibus Vol. 4	Thing "Measure of a Man" Al Milgrom
4	Wolverine "Save the Tiger" Chris Claremont and John Buscema Collected in Marvel Comics Presents: Wolverine Vol 1, Wolverine Epic Vol 1: Madripoor Nights, and Wolverine Omnibus Vol 1	Man-Thing "Elements of Terror" Steve Gerber and Tom Sutton Collected in The Man-Thing by Steve Gerber Vol. 3	Shang-Chi "Crossing Lines" Doug Moench and Tom Grindberg Collected in Shang-Chi, Master of Kung-Fu Omnibus Vol. 4	Thor "Silent Thunder" Al Milgrom
5	Wolverine "Save the Tiger" Chris Claremont and John Buscema Collected in Marvel Comics Presents: Wolverine Vol 1, Wolverine Epic Vol 1: Madripoor Nights, and Wolverine Omnibus Vol 1	Man-Thing "Elements of Terror" Steve Gerber and Tom Sutton Collected in The Man-Thing by Steve Gerber Vol. 3	Shang-Chi "Crossing Lines" Doug Moench and Tom Grindberg Collected in Shang-Chi, Master of Kung-Fu Omnibus Vol. 4	Daredevil "You'll See It When You Believe It" Terry Kavanagh and Dwayne Turner
6	Wolverine "Save the Tiger" Chris Claremont and John Buscema Collected in Marvel Comics Presents: Wolverine Vol 1, Wolverine Epic Vol 1: Madripoor Nights, and Wolverine Omnibus Vol 1	Man-Thing "Elements of Terror" Steve Gerber and Tom Sutton Collected in The Man-Thing by Steve Gerber Vol. 3	Shang-Chi "Crossing Lines" Doug Moench and Tom Grindberg Collected in Shang-Chi, Master of Kung-Fu Omnibus Vol. 4	Hulk "Risky Business" Bobbi Chase and Jeff Purves
7	Wolverine "Save the Tiger" Chris Claremont and John Buscema Collected in Marvel Comics Presents: Wolverine Vol 1, Wolverine Epic Vol 1: Madripoor Nights, and Wolverine Omnibus Vol 1	Man-Thing "Elements of Terror" Steve Gerber and Tom Sutton Collected in The Man-Thing by Steve Gerber Vol. 3	Shang-Chi "Crossing Lines" Doug Moench and Tom Grindberg Collected in Shang-Chi, Master of Kung-Fu Omnibus Vol. 4	Sub-Mariner "From Sea to Shining Sea" Steve Ditko and Hollis Bright
8	Wolverine "Save the Tiger" Chris Claremont and John Buscema Collected in Marvel Comics Presents: Wolverine Vol 1, Wolverine Epic Vol 1: Madripoor Nights, and Wolverine Omnibus Vol 1	Man-Thing "Elements of Terror" Steve Gerber and Tom Sutton Collected in The Man-Thing by Steve Gerber Vol. 3	Shang-Chi "Crossing Lines" Doug Moench and Tom Grindberg Collected in Shang-Chi, Master of Kung-Fu Omnibus Vol. 4	Iron Man "One Day at a Time" Sholly Fisch and Javier Saltares
9	Wolverine "Save the Tiger" Chris Claremont and John Buscema Collected in Marvel Comics Presents: Wolverine Vol 1, Wolverine Epic Vol 1: Madripoor Nights, and Wolverine Omnibus Vol 1	Man-Thing "Elements of Terror" Steve Gerber and Tom Sutton Collected in The Man-Thing by Steve Gerber Vol. 3	Cloak "In the Dark" Marcus McLaurin and Tony Salmons	Aguila "A Piece of Cake" Scott Lobdell and Larry Alexander
10	Wolverine "Save the Tiger" Chris Claremont and John Buscema Collected in Marvel Comics Presents: Wolverine Vol 1, Wolverine Epic Vol 1: Madripoor Nights, and Wolverine Omnibus Vol 1	Man-Thing "Elements of Terror" Steve Gerber and Tom Sutton Collected in The Man-Thing by Steve Gerber Vol. 3	Machine Man/Fantastic Four "Machine Man Meets the FF" Steve Ditko and Mike Rockwitz	Colossus "God's Country" Ann Nocenti and Rick Leonardi Collected in Colossus: God's Country; X-Men: X-Tinction Agenda Omnibus
11	Ant-Man "Drain Storm" Len Wein and Bob Layton	Man-Thing "Elements of Terror" Steve Gerber and Tom Sutton Collected in The Man-Thing by Steve Gerber Vol. 3	Slag "Over and Over" Jon Figueroa and Ron Wilson Collected in Wolfpack: The Complete Collection	Colossus "God's Country" Ann Nocenti and Rick Leonardi Collected in Colossus: God's Country; X-Men: X-Tinction Agenda Omnibus
12	Hercules "Noble Fathers Have Noble Sons" Chris Henderson and Don Heck	Man-Thing "Elements of Terror" Steve Gerber and Tom Sutton Collected in The Man-Thing by Steve Gerber Vol. 3	Namorita "Spring Break" Scott Lobdell and Frank Springer	Colossus "God's Country" Ann Nocenti and Rick Leonardi Collected in Colossus: God's Country; X-Men: X-Tinction Agenda Omnibus
13	Black Panther "Panther's Quest" Don McGregor and Gene Colan Collected in Black Panther: Panther's Quest, Black Panther Epic Collection: Panther's Prey, Black Panther Omnibus: Revenge of the Black Panther, and Marvel Masterworks: Black Panther Vol. 3	Invisible Woman and Mr. Fantastic "Reed's On the Roof and We Can't Get Him Down" Chris Henderson and Mike Harris	Shanna the She-Devil "A Tooth for a Tooth" Bruce Jones	Colossus "God's Country" Ann Nocenti and Rick Leonardi Collected in Colossus: God's Country; X-Men: X-Tinction Agenda Omnibus
14	Black Panther "Panther's Quest" Don McGregor and Gene Colan Collected in Black Panther: Panther's Quest, Black Panther Epic Collection: Panther's Prey, Black Panther Omnibus: Revenge of the Black Panther, and Marvel Masterworks: Black Panther Vol. 3	Speedball "The Feathered Felon" Steve Ditko and Jo Duffy Collected in Speedball Classic	Nomad "Angel in the Snow" Fabian Nicieza and Larry Alexander	Colossus "God's Country" Ann Nocenti and Rick Leonardi Collected in Colossus: God's Country; X-Men: X-Tinction Agenda Omnibus
15	Black Panther "Panther's Quest" Don McGregor and Gene Colan Collected in Black Panther: Panther's Quest, Black Panther Epic Collection: Panther's Prey, Black Panther Omnibus: Revenge of the Black Panther, and Marvel Masterworks: Black Panther Vol. 3	Marvel Girl (Jean Grey) "The Maiden Phoenix" Bobbi Chase and Dwayne Turner Collected in X-Factor: The Original X-Men Omnibus Vol. 2	Red Wolf "Desert Tears" Fabian Nicieza and Javier Saltares	Colossus "God's Country" Ann Nocenti and Rick Leonardi Collected in Colossus: God's Country; X-Men: X-Tinction Agenda Omnibus
16	Black Panther "Panther's Quest" Don McGregor and Gene Colan Collected in Black Panther: Panther's Quest, Black Panther Epic Collection: Panther's Prey, Black Panther Omnibus: Revenge of the Black Panther, and Marvel Masterworks: Black Panther Vol. 3	Gateway/X-Men "Dreamwalk" Ann Nocenti and Larry Dixon Collected in X-Men: X-Tinction Agenda Omnibus	Ka-Zar "This Is a Savage Land" Dwight J. Zimmerman and Jim Mooney	Colossus "God's Country" Ann Nocenti and Rick Leonardi Collected in Colossus: God's Country; X-Men: X-Tinction Agenda Omnibus
17	Black Panther "Panther's Quest" Don McGregor and Gene Colan Collected in Black Panther: Panther's Quest, Black Panther Epic Collection: Panther's Prey, Black Panther Omnibus: Revenge of the Black Panther, and Marvel Masterworks: Black Panther Vol. 3	Cyclops "The Retribution Affair" Bob Harras and Ron Lim Collected in Cyclops: Retribution and X-Factor: The Original X-Men Omnibus Vol. 2	Uatu, the Watcher "Do You See What I See?" Scott Lobdell and Tom Sutton	Colossus "God's Country" Ann Nocenti and Rick Leonardi Collected in Colossus: God's Country; X-Men: X-Tinction Agenda Omnibus
18	Black Panther "Panther's Quest" Don McGregor and Gene Colan Collected in Black Panther: Panther's Quest, Black Panther Epic Collection: Panther's Prey, Black Panther Omnibus: Revenge of the Black Panther, and Marvel Masterworks: Black Panther Vol. 3	Cyclops "The Retribution Affair" Bob Harras and Ron Lim Collected in Cyclops: Retribution and X-Factor: The Original X-Men Omnibus Vol. 2	She-Hulk "X-Mas Tease" John Byrne Collected in The Sensational She-Hulk by John Byrne, The Sensational She-Hulk by John Byrne Omnibus and She-Hulk Epic Collection: Breaking the Fourth Wall	Willie Lumpkin "A Christmas Card" Glenn Herdling and Richard Howell
19	Black Panther "Panther's Quest" Don McGregor and Gene Colan Collected in Black Panther: Panther's Quest, Black Panther Epic Collection: Panther's Prey, Black Panther Omnibus: Revenge of the Black Panther, and Marvel Masterworks: Black Panther Vol. 3	Cyclops "The Retribution Affair" Bob Harras and Ron Lim Collected in Cyclops: Retribution and X-Factor: The Original X-Men Omnibus Vol. 2	Doctor Strange "Nightmare in Suburbia" Fabian Nicieza and Mark Badger	Damage Control "Overture" Dwayne McDuffie and Ernie Colon Collected in Damage Control: The Complete Collection
20	Black Panther "Panther's Quest" Don McGregor and Gene Colan Collected in Black Panther: Panther's Quest, Black Panther Epic Collection: Panther's Prey, Black Panther Omnibus: Revenge of the Black Panther, and Marvel Masterworks: Black Panther Vol. 3	Cyclops "The Retribution Affair" Bob Harras and Ron Lim Collected in Cyclops: Retribution and X-Factor: The Original X-Men Omnibus Vol. 2	Doctor Strange "Nightmare in Suburbia" Fabian Nicieza and Mark Badger	Clea "At the Bottom of My Garden" Peter B. Gillis and Ron Lim
21	Black Panther "Panther's Quest" Don McGregor and Gene Colan Collected in Black Panther: Panther's Quest, Black Panther Epic Collection: Panther's Prey, Black Panther Omnibus: Revenge of the Black Panther, and Marvel Masterworks: Black Panther Vol. 3	Cyclops "The Retribution Affair" Bob Harras and Ron Lim Collected in Cyclops: Retribution and X-Factor: The Original X-Men Omnibus Vol. 2	Paladin "Let's Take It from Where I Swing in and Rescue You" Scott Lobdell and Ron Wilson	Thing "The First Cut" Marcus McLaurin and Kevin VanHook
22	Black Panther "Panther's Quest" Don McGregor and Gene Colan Collected in Black Panther: Panther's Quest, Black Panther Epic Collection: Panther's Prey, Black Panther Omnibus: Revenge of the Black Panther, and Marvel Masterworks: Black Panther Vol. 3	Cyclops "The Retribution Affair" Bob Harras and Ron Lim Collected in Cyclops: Retribution and X-Factor: The Original X-Men Omnibus Vol. 2	Mirage and Wolfsbane (New Mutants) "Suffer a Wolf to Live" Sue Flaxman and Rodney Ramos Collected in New Mutants Omnibus Vol 3	Starfox "New Worlds to Conquer" Peter Gillis and Dave Cockrum
23	Black Panther "Panther's Quest" Don McGregor and Gene Colan Collected in Black Panther: Panther's Quest, Black Panther Epic Collection: Panther's Prey, Black Panther Omnibus: Revenge of the Black Panther, and Marvel Masterworks: Black Panther Vol. 3	Cyclops "The Retribution Affair" Bob Harras and Ron Lim Collected in Cyclops: Retribution and X-Factor: The Original X-Men Omnibus Vol. 2	Falcon "The Forest for the Trees" Fabian Nicieza and Dave Cockrum	Wheels Wolinski "Lady Jane" Jon Figueroa and Ron Wilson Collected in Wolfpack: The Complete Collection
24	Black Panther "Panther's Quest" Don McGregor and Gene Colan Collected in Black Panther: Panther's Quest, Black Panther Epic Collection: Panther's Prey, Black Panther Omnibus: Revenge of the Black Panther, and Marvel Masterworks: Black Panther Vol. 3	Cyclops "The Retribution Affair" Bob Harras and Ron Lim Collected in Cyclops: Retribution and X-Factor: The Original X-Men Omnibus Vol. 2	Shamrock "I Haven't Got Time for the Pain" Scott Lobdell and Dennis Jensen	Havok (X-Men) "Pharoah's Legacy" Howard Mackie and Rich Buckler Collected in X-Men: X-Tinction Agenda Omnibus
25	Black Panther "Panther's Quest" Don McGregor and Gene Colan Collected in Black Panther: Panther's Quest, Black Panther Epic Collection: Panther's Prey, Black Panther Omnibus: Revenge of the Black Panther, and Marvel Masterworks: Black Panther Vol. 3	Nth Man "From Little Acorns Grow" Larry Hama and Ron Wagner	Ursa Major "Sophia" Scott Lobdell and Don Hudson	Havok (X-Men) "Pharoah's Legacy" Howard Mackie and Rich Buckler Collected in X-Men: X-Tinction Agenda Omnibus
26	Black Panther "Panther's Quest" Don McGregor and Gene Colan Collected in Black Panther: Panther's Quest, Black Panther Epic Collection: Panther's Prey, Black Panther Omnibus: Revenge of the Black Panther, and Marvel Masterworks: Black Panther Vol. 3	Mr. Fixit (Hulk) "Splashdown" Peter David and Jeff Purves Collected in Incredible Hulk by Peter David Omnibus Vol. 1, Atlantis Attacks Omnibus, and Incredible Hulk Epic Collection Vol 16: Joe Fixit	Coldblood "Rise and Shine" Doug Moench and Paul Gulacy	Havok (X-Men) "Pharoah's Legacy" Howard Mackie and Rich Buckler Collected in X-Men: X-Tinction Agenda Omnibus
27	Black Panther "Panther's Quest" Don McGregor and Gene Colan Collected in Black Panther: Panther's Quest, Black Panther Epic Collection: Panther's Prey, Black Panther Omnibus: Revenge of the Black Panther, and Marvel Masterworks: Black Panther Vol. 3	American Eagle "Just Another Shade of Hate" Scott Lobdell and Ron Wilson	Coldblood "Rise and Shine" Doug Moench and Paul Gulacy	Havok (X-Men) "Pharoah's Legacy" Howard Mackie and Rich Buckler Collected in X-Men: X-Tinction Agenda Omnibus
28	Black Panther "Panther's Quest" Don McGregor and Gene Colan Collected in Black Panther: Panther's Quest, Black Panther Epic Collection: Panther's Prey, Black Panther Omnibus: Revenge of the Black Panther, and Marvel Masterworks: Black Panther Vol. 3	Triton (Inhumans) "Giving Peace a Chance" Robert Campanella and Javier Saltares	Coldblood "Rise and Shine" Doug Moench and Paul Gulacy	Havok (X-Men) "Pharoah's Legacy" Howard Mackie and Rich Buckler Collected in X-Men: X-Tinction Agenda Omnibus
29	Black Panther "Panther's Quest" Don McGregor and Gene Colan Collected in Black Panther: Panther's Quest, Black Panther Epic Collection: Panther's Prey, Black Panther Omnibus: Revenge of the Black Panther, and Marvel Masterworks: Black Panther Vol. 3	Quasar "It Came from Within..." Mark Gruenwald and Paul Ryan Collected in Quasar Classic Vol. 1	Coldblood "Rise and Shine" Doug Moench and Paul Gulacy	Havok (X-Men) "Pharoah's Legacy" Howard Mackie and Rich Buckler Collected in X-Men: X-Tinction Agenda Omnibus
30	Black Panther "Panther's Quest" Don McGregor and Gene Colan Collected in Black Panther: Panther's Quest, Black Panther Epic Collection: Panther's Prey, Black Panther Omnibus: Revenge of the Black Panther, and Marvel Masterworks: Black Panther Vol. 3	Leir "The Temper of a God..." Sue Flaxman and Tom Morgan	Coldblood "Rise and Shine" Doug Moench and Paul Gulacy	Havok (X-Men) "Pharoah's Legacy" Howard Mackie and Rich Buckler Collected in X-Men: X-Tinction Agenda Omnibus
31	Black Panther "Panther's Quest" Don McGregor and Gene Colan Collected in Black Panther: Panther's Quest, Black Panther Epic Collection: Panther's Prey, Black Panther Omnibus: Revenge of the Black Panther, and Marvel Masterworks: Black Panther Vol. 3	Excalibur "Having a Wild Weekend" Michael Higgins and Erik Larsen Collected in Excalibur Epic Collection: The Sword is Drawn and Excalibur Omnibus Vol 1	Coldblood "Rise and Shine" Doug Moench and Paul Gulacy	Havok (X-Men) "Pharoah's Legacy" Howard Mackie and Rich Buckler Collected in X-Men: X-Tinction Agenda Omnibus
32	Black Panther "Panther's Quest" Don McGregor and Gene Colan Collected in Black Panther: Panther's Quest, Black Panther Epic Collection: Panther's Prey, Black Panther Omnibus: Revenge of the Black Panther, and Marvel Masterworks: Black Panther Vol. 3	Excalibur "Having a Wild Weekend" Michael Higgins and Erik Larsen Collected in Excalibur Epic Collection: The Sword is Drawn and Excalibur Omnibus Vol 1	Coldblood "Rise and Shine" Doug Moench and Paul Gulacy	Sunfire "The Dreaded Deadline Doom" Scott Lobdell and Don Heck Collected in X-Men: X-Tinction Agenda Omnibus
33	Black Panther "Panther's Quest" Don McGregor and Gene Colan Collected in Black Panther: Panther's Quest, Black Panther Epic Collection: Panther's Prey, Black Panther Omnibus: Revenge of the Black Panther, and Marvel Masterworks: Black Panther Vol. 3	Excalibur "Having a Wild Weekend" Michael Higgins and Erik Larsen Collected in Excalibur Epic Collection: The Sword is Drawn and Excalibur Omnibus Vol 1	Coldblood "Rise and Shine" Doug Moench and Paul Gulacy	Sub-Mariner "Dying in Paradise" Don McGregor and Jim Lee
34	Black Panther "Panther's Quest" Don McGregor and Gene Colan Collected in Black Panther: Panther's Quest, Black Panther Epic Collection: Panther's Prey, Black Panther Omnibus: Revenge of the Black Panther, and Marvel Masterworks: Black Panther Vol. 3	Excalibur "Having a Wild Weekend" Michael Higgins and Erik Larsen Collected in Excalibur Epic Collection: The Sword is Drawn and Excalibur Omnibus Vol 1	Coldblood "Rise and Shine" Doug Moench and Paul Gulacy	Captain America "Past and Present Sins" Sholly Fisch and Jack Sparling
35	Black Panther "Panther's Quest" Don McGregor and Gene Colan Collected in Black Panther: Panther's Quest, Black Panther Epic Collection: Panther's Prey, Black Panther Omnibus: Revenge of the Black Panther, and Marvel Masterworks: Black Panther Vol. 3	Excalibur "Having a Wild Weekend" Michael Higgins and Erik Larsen Collected in Excalibur Epic Collection: The Sword is Drawn and Excalibur Omnibus Vol 1	Coldblood "Rise and Shine" Doug Moench and Paul Gulacy	Her "Gods R' Us" Fabian Nicieza and Erik Larsen
36	Black Panther "Panther's Quest" Don McGregor and Gene Colan Collected in Black Panther: Panther's Quest, Black Panther Epic Collection: Panther's Prey, Black Panther Omnibus: Revenge of the Black Panther, and Marvel Masterworks: Black Panther Vol. 3	Excalibur "Having a Wild Weekend" Michael Higgins and Erik Larsen Collected in Excalibur Epic Collection: The Sword is Drawn and Excalibur Omnibus Vol 1	Hellcat "Encounter in the Alley of Death" Jack Harris and June Brigman Collected in Women of Marvel: Celebrating Seven Decades Omnibus	
37	Black Panther "Panther's Quest" Don McGregor and Gene Colan Collected in Black Panther: Panther's Quest, Black Panther Epic Collection: Panther's Prey, Black Panther Omnibus: Revenge of the Black Panther, and Marvel Masterworks: Black Panther Vol. 3	Excalibur "Having a Wild Weekend" Michael Higgins and Erik Larsen Collected in Excalibur Epic Collection: The Sword is Drawn and Excalibur Omnibus Vol 1	Devil Slayer "To Slay the Devil" Dwight J. Zimmerman and Rodney Ramos	
38	Wolverine "Black Shadow White Shadow" Marv Wolfman and John Buscema Collected in Marvel Comics Presents Wolverine Vol. 2 and Wolverine Omnibus Vol. 2	Excalibur "Having a Wild Weekend" Michael Higgins and Erik Larsen Collected in Excalibur Epic Collection: The Sword is Drawn and Excalibur Omnibus Vol 1	Wonder Man "Stardust Miseries" Michael Higgins and Javier Saltares Collected in Wonder Man: The Early Years Omnibus	Mr. Fixit (Hulk) "Art for Art's Sake" Bill Mumy and Marshall Rogers
39	Wolverine "Black Shadow White Shadow" Marv Wolfman and John Buscema Collected in Marvel Comics Presents Wolverine Vol. 2 and Wolverine Omnibus Vol. 2	Hercules "All in the Family" Bob Layton Collected in Marvel Premiere Classic - Hercules: Full Circle	Wonder Man "Stardust Miseries" Michael Higgins and Javier Saltares Collected in Wonder Man: The Early Years Omnibus	Spider-Man "With Liberty and Justice for All" Bill Mumy and Aaron Lopresti
40	Wolverine "Black Shadow White Shadow" Marv Wolfman and John Buscema Collected in Marvel Comics Presents Wolverine Vol. 2 and Wolverine Omnibus Vol. 2	Hercules "All in the Family" Bob Layton Collected in Marvel Premiere Classic - Hercules: Full Circle	Wonder Man "Stardust Miseries" Michael Higgins and Javier Saltares Collected in Wonder Man: The Early Years Omnibus	Overmind (The Eternals) "Anything" Scott Lobdell and Don Heck
41	Wolverine "Black Shadow White Shadow" Marv Wolfman and John Buscema Collected in Marvel Comics Presents Wolverine Vol. 2 and Wolverine Omnibus Vol. 2	Hercules "All in the Family" Bob Layton Collected in Marvel Premiere Classic - Hercules: Full Circle	Wonder Man "Stardust Miseries" Michael Higgins and Javier Saltares Collected in Wonder Man: The Early Years Omnibus	Freedom Force "Forced Fed" Scott Lobdell and Dave Cockrum Collected in X-Men: X-Tinction Agenda Omnibus
42	Wolverine "Black Shadow White Shadow" Marv Wolfman and John Buscema Collected in Marvel Comics Presents Wolverine Vol. 2 and Wolverine Omnibus Vol. 2	Union Jack "The Establishment" Fabian Nicieza and Kieron Dwyer	Wonder Man "Stardust Miseries" Michael Higgins and Javier Saltares Collected in Wonder Man: The Early Years Omnibus	Daughters of the Dragon "Armed and Dangerous" Jo Duffy and Chris Tsuda
43	Wolverine "Black Shadow White Shadow" Marv Wolfman and John Buscema Collected in Marvel Comics Presents Wolverine Vol. 2 and Wolverine Omnibus Vol. 2	Iron Man "Donovan's Brains" Ed Simmons and Mark Bagley	Wonder Man "Stardust Miseries" Michael Higgins and Javier Saltares Collected in Wonder Man: The Early Years Omnibus	Syrin (X-Men) "Hello Little Girl...Is Your Father Home?" Scott Lobdell and Larry Stroman Collected in X-Men: X-Tinction Agenda Omnibus
44	Wolverine "Black Shadow White Shadow" Marv Wolfman and John Buscema Collected in Marvel Comics Presents Wolverine Vol. 2 and Wolverine Omnibus Vol. 2	Doctor Strange "Trashed" Roy Thomas and Dave Simons	Wonder Man "Stardust Miseries" Michael Higgins and Javier Saltares Collected in Wonder Man: The Early Years Omnibus	Puma "...And Not a Drop to Drink" Dan Mishkin and Gavin Curtis
45	Wolverine "Black Shadow White Shadow" Marv Wolfman and John Buscema Collected in Marvel Comics Presents Wolverine Vol. 2 and Wolverine Omnibus Vol. 2	Mr. Fixit (Hulk) "The Main Event" Peter David and Herb Trimpe Collected in Incredible Hulk by Peter David Omnibus Vol. 1 and Incredible Hulk Epic Collection Vol 16: Joe Fixit	Wonder Man "Stardust Miseries" Michael Higgins and Javier Saltares Collected in Wonder Man: The Early Years Omnibus	Shooting Star "Bang Bang, Shoot Shoot" Robert Campanella and Jose Delbo
46	Wolverine "Black Shadow White Shadow" Marv Wolfman and John Buscema Collected in Marvel Comics Presents Wolverine Vol. 2 and Wolverine Omnibus Vol. 2	Devil-Slayer "Lost Souls" Dwight J. Zimmerman and Rodney Ramos	Aquarian "A Gift of Death" Fabian Nicieza and Hugh Hayes	Sub-Mariner "The Eye That Sees" Hollis Bright and Dell Barras
47	Wolverine "Black Shadow White Shadow" Marv Wolfman and John Buscema Collected in Marvel Comics Presents Wolverine Vol. 2 and Wolverine Omnibus Vol. 2	Devil-Slayer "Lost Souls" Dwight J. Zimmerman and Rodney Ramos	Captain America "Old Glories" Len Wein, Deni Loubert and Steve Buccellato	Arabian Night "A Father's Love" Scott Lobdell and Don Perlin
48	Wolverine and Spider-Man "Life's End" Erik Larsen Collected in Marvel Comics Presents Wolverine Vol. 2, Wolverine Omnibus Vol. 2, Spider-Man by David Michelinie and Erik Larsen Omnibus, and Wolverine Versus Spider-Man (1995)	Devil-Slayer "Lost Souls" Dwight J. Zimmerman and Rodney Ramos	Wasp "Object" Marcus McLaurin and Eric Shanower	Storm and Dr. Doom "When It Rains" Dwight J. Zimmerman and Rodney Ramos Collected in X-Men: X-Tinction Agenda Omnibus
49	Wolverine and Spider-Man "Life's End" Erik Larsen Collected in Marvel Comics Presents Wolverine Vol. 2, Wolverine Omnibus Vol. 2, Spider-Man by David Michelinie and Erik Larsen Omnibus, and Wolverine Versus Spider-Man (1995)	Devil-Slayer "Lost Souls" Dwight J. Zimmerman and Rodney Ramos	Daredevil "White Messiah" John Figueroa and Ron Wilson	Gladiator (Imperial Guard) "The Unbeatable Foe" Len Kaminski and Don Heck Collected in X-Men: X-Tinction Agenda Omnibus
50	Wolverine and Spider-Man "Life's End" Erik Larsen Collected in Marvel Comics Presents Wolverine Vol. 2, Wolverine Omnibus Vol. 2, Spider-Man by David Michelinie and Erik Larsen Omnibus, and Wolverine Versus Spider-Man (1995)	Comet-Man "A Family Affair" Bill Mumy, Miguel Ferrer and Kelley Jones	Captain Ultra "I Just Flew in from Poughkeepsie and Boy Are My Arms Tired" Scott Lobdell and Dennis Jensen	Silver Surfer "You Can't Go Home Again" Ed Simmons and Jack Sparling Collected in Silver Surfer Epic Collection: Thanos Quest and Silver Surfer: The Infinity Gauntlet Omnibus
51	Wolverine/Wild Child (Alpha Flight) "The Wilding" Rob Liefeld and Fabian Nicieza Collected in Marvel Comics Presents Wolverine Vol. 3, Wolverine Omnibus Vol. 2 and Marvel Universe by Rob Liefeld Omnibus	Comet-Man "A Family Affair" Bill Mumy, Miguel Ferrer and Kelley Jones	Iron Man "The Other Way Out" Steve Saffel and Mark Bright	Le Peregrine "The Straight Approach" Fabian Nicieza and Don Heck
52	Wolverine/Wild Child (Alpha Flight) "The Wilding" Rob Liefeld and Fabian Nicieza Collected in Marvel Comics Presents Wolverine Vol. 3, Wolverine Omnibus Vol. 2 and Marvel Universe by Rob Liefeld Omnibus	Comet-Man "A Family Affair" Bill Mumy, Miguel Ferrer and Kelley Jones	Rick Jones "Last Resort" Rich Howell	Hulk "Kids Will Be Kids" Ron Wilson
53	Wolverine/Wild Child (Alpha Flight) "The Wilding" Rob Liefeld and Fabian Nicieza Collected in Marvel Comics Presents Wolverine Vol. 3, Wolverine Omnibus Vol. 2 and Marvel Universe by Rob Liefeld Omnibus	Comet-Man "A Family Affair" Bill Mumy, Miguel Ferrer and Kelley Jones	Stingray "Family Matters" Len Wein and Jim Fern	Black Widow/Silver Sable "Heads I Win, Tails You Lose" Fabian Nicieza and Rob Liefeld Collected in Black Widow: Marvel Team-Up and Marvel Universe by Rob Liefeld Omnibus
54	Wolverine and Hulk "On the Road" Michael Higgins and David Ross Collected in Marvel Comics Presents Wolverine Vol. 3 and Wolverine Omnibus Vol. 2	Werewolf By Night "Children of the Beast" Len Kaminski and Jim Fry	Stingray "Family Matters" Len Wein and Jim Fern	Shroud "The Dark Light of Kali" Steve Ditko and Hollis Bright
55	Wolverine and Hulk "On the Road" Michael Higgins and David Ross Collected in Marvel Comics Presents Wolverine Vol. 3 and Wolverine Omnibus Vol. 2	Werewolf By Night "Children of the Beast" Len Kaminski and Jim Fry	Stingray "Family Matters" Len Wein and Jim Fern	Collective Man "The Sons of Mary Tao-Yu" Scott Lobdell and George LaRocque
56	Wolverine and Hulk "On the Road" Michael Higgins and David Ross Collected in Marvel Comics Presents Wolverine Vol. 3 and Wolverine Omnibus Vol. 2	Werewolf By Night "Children of the Beast" Len Kaminski and Jim Fry	Stingray "Family Matters" Len Wein and Jim Fern	Speedball "Any Number Can Play" Mary Jo Duffy and Steve Ditko Collected in Speedball Classic
57	Wolverine and Hulk "On the Road" Michael Higgins and David Ross Collected in Marvel Comics Presents Wolverine Vol. 3 and Wolverine Omnibus Vol. 2	Werewolf By Night "Children of the Beast" Len Kaminski and Jim Fry	Sub-Mariner "Neptune's Eye" Robert Denatale and Mike Collins	Black Cat "The Crown Jewel Caper" Dwight J. Zimmerman and Mike Harris
58	Wolverine and Hulk "On the Road" Michael Higgins and David Ross Collected in Marvel Comics Presents Wolverine Vol. 3 and Wolverine Omnibus Vol. 2	Werewolf By Night "Children of the Beast" Len Kaminski and Jim Fry	Sub-Mariner "Neptune's Eye" Robert Denatale and Mike Collins	Iron Man "Neutralizing Effects" Steve Ditko and Hollis Bright
59	Wolverine and Hulk "On the Road" Michael Higgins and David Ross Collected in Marvel Comics Presents Wolverine Vol. 3 and Wolverine Omnibus Vol. 2	Werewolf By Night "Children of the Beast" Len Kaminski and Jim Fry	Sub-Mariner "Neptune's Eye" Robert Denatale and Mike Collins	Punisher "The Real Thing" Marcus McLaurin and Dan Reed
60	Wolverine and Hulk "On the Road" Michael Higgins and David Ross Collected in Marvel Comics Presents Wolverine Vol. 3 and Wolverine Omnibus Vol. 2	Poison "Vandals of the Heart" Steve Gerber and Cindy Martin	Scarlet Witch "Separate Lives" Richard Howell Collected in Avengers: Scarlet Witch	Captain America "The American Way" John Figueroa and Tom Lyle
61	Wolverine and Hulk "On the Road" Michael Higgins and David Ross Collected in Marvel Comics Presents Wolverine Vol. 3 and Wolverine Omnibus Vol. 2	Poison "Vandals of the Heart" Steve Gerber and Cindy Martin	Scarlet Witch "Separate Lives" Richard Howell Collected in Avengers: Scarlet Witch	Doctor Strange "The Librarian" Peter Gillis and Chris Tsuda
62	Wolverine "Sign of the Beast" Dwight J. Zimmerman and Paul Ryan Collected in Marvel Comics Presents Wolverine Vol. 4 and Wolverine Omnibus Vol. 2	Poison "Vandals of the Heart" Steve Gerber and Cindy Martin	Scarlet Witch "Separate Lives" Richard Howell Collected in Avengers: Scarlet Witch	Deathlok "Test Run" Dwayne McDuffie, Gregory Wright and Jackson Guice
63	Wolverine "Sign of the Beast" Dwight J. Zimmerman and Paul Ryan Collected in Marvel Comics Presents Wolverine Vol. 4 and Wolverine Omnibus Vol. 2	Poison "Vandals of the Heart" Steve Gerber and Cindy Martin	Scarlet Witch "Separate Lives" Richard Howell Collected in Avengers: Scarlet Witch	Thor "Norse Blood" Len Kaminski and Don Heck
64	Wolverine and Ghost Rider "Acts of Vengeance" Howard Mackie and Mark Texeira Collected in Marvel Comics Presents Wolverine Vol. 4, Wolverine Omnibus Vol. 2, Ghost Rider: Danny Ketch Epic Collection Vol 1: Vengeance Reborn, and Ghost Rider: Danny Ketch Omnibus Vol 1	Poison "Vandals of the Heart" Steve Gerber and Cindy Martin	Mr. Fantastic "Dark Dimensions" Robert Denatale and Mike Harris	Blade "Vampires" Marcus McLaurin and Malcolm Davis Collected in Blade: The Early Years Omnibus
65	Wolverine and Ghost Rider "Acts of Vengeance" Howard Mackie and Mark Texeira Collected in Marvel Comics Presents Wolverine Vol. 4, Wolverine Omnibus Vol. 2, Ghost Rider: Danny Ketch Epic Collection Vol 1: Vengeance Reborn, and Ghost Rider: Danny Ketch Omnibus Vol 1	Poison "Vandals of the Heart" Steve Gerber and Cindy Martin	Mr. Fantastic "Dark Dimensions" Robert Denatale and Mike Harris	Starfox "Wang Dang Doodle" Peter Gillis and Ernie Chan
66	Wolverine and Ghost Rider "Acts of Vengeance" Howard Mackie and Mark Texeira Collected in Marvel Comics Presents Wolverine Vol. 4, Wolverine Omnibus Vol. 2, Ghost Rider: Danny Ketch Epic Collection Vol 1: Vengeance Reborn, and Ghost Rider: Danny Ketch Omnibus Vol 1	Poison "Vandals of the Heart" Steve Gerber and Cindy Martin	Mr. Fantastic "Dark Dimensions" Robert Denatale and Mike Harris	Volstagg "The Thief of Asgard" Sholly Fisch and Sam Grainger Collected in Marvel Premiere Classic - Thor: The Warriors Three Unleashed and Thor - The Warriors Three: The Complete Collection
67	Wolverine and Ghost Rider "Acts of Vengeance" Howard Mackie and Mark Texeira Collected in Marvel Comics Presents Wolverine Vol. 4, Wolverine Omnibus Vol. 2, Ghost Rider: Danny Ketch Epic Collection Vol 1: Vengeance Reborn, and Ghost Rider: Danny Ketch Omnibus Vol 1	Poison "Vandals of the Heart" Steve Gerber and Cindy Martin	Mr. Fantastic "Dark Dimensions" Robert Denatale and Mike Harris	Spider-Man "Slow Burn" Len Wein and Dean Ormstrom
68	Wolverine and Ghost Rider "Acts of Vengeance" Howard Mackie and Mark Texeira Collected in Marvel Comics Presents Wolverine Vol. 4, Wolverine Omnibus Vol. 2, Ghost Rider: Danny Ketch Epic Collection Vol 1: Vengeance Reborn, and Ghost Rider: Danny Ketch Omnibus Vol 1	Shanna the She-Devil "Bush of Ghosts" Gerard Jones and Paul Gulacy	Mr. Fantastic "Dark Dimensions" Robert Denatale and Mike Harris	Lockjaw (Inhumans) "Sparky the Wonder Dog" Scott Lobdell and Jose Delbo
69	Wolverine and Ghost Rider "Acts of Vengeance" Howard Mackie and Mark Texeira Collected in Marvel Comics Presents Wolverine Vol. 4, Wolverine Omnibus Vol. 2, Ghost Rider: Danny Ketch Epic Collection Vol 1: Vengeance Reborn, and Ghost Rider: Danny Ketch Omnibus Vol 1	Shanna the She-Devil "Bush of Ghosts" Gerard Jones and Paul Gulacy	Daredevil "Redemption Song" Sandy Plunkett and Dwayne Turner	Silver Surfer "A Howling in the Void" Len Wein and Hugh Haynes Collected in Silver Surfer Epic Collection: The Infinity Gauntlet and Silver Surfer: The Infinity Gauntlet Omnibus
70	Wolverine and Ghost Rider "Acts of Vengeance" Howard Mackie and Mark Texeira Collected in Marvel Comics Presents Wolverine Vol. 4, Wolverine Omnibus Vol. 2, Ghost Rider: Danny Ketch Epic Collection Vol 1: Vengeance Reborn, and Ghost Rider: Danny Ketch Omnibus Vol 1	Shanna the She-Devil "Bush of Ghosts" Gerard Jones and Paul Gulacy	Daredevil "Redemption Song" Sandy Plunkett and Dwayne Turner	Black Widow "One Into Three Won't Go" Robert Campanella and Larry Alexander Collected in Black Widow: Marvel Team-Up
71	Wolverine and Ghost Rider "Acts of Vengeance" Howard Mackie and Mark Texeira Collected in Marvel Comics Presents Wolverine Vol. 4, Wolverine Omnibus Vol. 2, Ghost Rider: Danny Ketch Epic Collection Vol 1: Vengeance Reborn, and Ghost Rider: Danny Ketch Omnibus Vol 1	Shanna the She-Devil "Bush of Ghosts" Gerard Jones and Paul Gulacy	Daredevil "Redemption Song" Sandy Plunkett and Dwayne Turner	Warlock (New Mutants) "Warlock and the Fleshtones" Scott Lobdell and Scott McDaniel Collected in New Mutants Omnibus Vol 4
72	Wolverine "Weapon X" Barry Windsor-Smith Collected in Marvel Premiere Classic - Wolverine: Weapon X, Wolverine Epic Collection Vol 4: Escape from Weapon X, and Wolverine Omnibus Vol 1	Shanna the She-Devil "Bush of Ghosts" Gerard Jones and Paul Gulacy	Daredevil "Redemption Song" Sandy Plunkett and Dwayne Turner	Red Wolf "Flesh of My Flesh" Fabian Nicieza and Javier Saltares
73	Wolverine "Weapon X" Barry Windsor-Smith Collected in Marvel Premiere Classic - Wolverine: Weapon X, Wolverine Epic Collection Vol 4: Escape from Weapon X, and Wolverine Omnibus Vol 1	Shanna the She-Devil "Bush of Ghosts" Gerard Jones and Paul Gulacy	Black Knight "The Sands of Time" Jason Balgobis, Russell Lyman, and Dave Cockrum	Sub-Mariner "The Sea Enemy" John Morelli and Jim Mooney
74	Wolverine "Weapon X" Barry Windsor-Smith Collected in Marvel Premiere Classic - Wolverine: Weapon X, Wolverine Epic Collection Vol 4: Escape from Weapon X, and Wolverine Omnibus Vol 1	Shanna the She-Devil "Bush of Ghosts" Gerard Jones and Paul Gulacy	Constrictor "The Freebie" Scott Lobdell and Scott McDaniel	Iceman and Human Torch "Absolute Zero" Dan Mishkin and Joe Statin Collected in X-Factor: The Original X-Men Omnibus Vol. 3
75	Wolverine "Weapon X" Barry Windsor-Smith Collected in Marvel Premiere Classic - Wolverine: Weapon X, Wolverine Epic Collection Vol 4: Escape from Weapon X, and Wolverine Omnibus Vol 1	Shanna the She-Devil "Bush of Ghosts" Gerard Jones and Paul Gulacy	Meagan and Shadowcat (Excalibur) "Charmed Lives" Sue Flaxman and Gavin Curtis Collected in Excalibur Epic Collection: Girls School from Heck and Excalibur Omnibus Vol 2	Dr. Doom "Triumph" Dave Cockrum
76	Wolverine "Weapon X" Barry Windsor-Smith Collected in Marvel Premiere Classic - Wolverine: Weapon X, Wolverine Epic Collection Vol 4: Escape from Weapon X, and Wolverine Omnibus Vol 1	Shanna the She-Devil "Bush of Ghosts" Gerard Jones and Paul Gulacy	Death's Head "The Deadliest Game" Simon Furman and Bryan Hitch Collected in Death's Head: Freelance Peacekeeping Agent	Woodgod "Lonely at the Top" Robert Campanella and Dave Cockrum
77	Wolverine "Weapon X" Barry Windsor-Smith Collected in Marvel Premiere Classic - Wolverine: Weapon X, Wolverine Epic Collection Vol 4: Escape from Weapon X, and Wolverine Omnibus Vol 1	Shanna the She-Devil "Bush of Ghosts" Gerard Jones and Paul Gulacy	Dracula and Nick Fury "Rumanian Rumble" Doug Murray and Tom Lyle	Sub-Mariner "The Tides That Bind" Robert Campanella and Grant Miehm
78	Wolverine "Weapon X" Barry Windsor-Smith Collected in Marvel Premiere Classic - Wolverine: Weapon X, Wolverine Epic Collection Vol 4: Escape from Weapon X, and Wolverine Omnibus Vol 1	Iron Man "Games" Doug Murray and Ken Steacy	Dracula and Nick Fury "Rumanian Rumble" Doug Murray and Tom Lyle	Selene (Hellfire Club) & Hulk "Not Interested" Dwight J. Zimmerman and Brian Stelfreeze Collected in New Mutants Omnibus Vol 4
79	Wolverine "Weapon X" Barry Windsor-Smith Collected in Marvel Premiere Classic - Wolverine: Weapon X, Wolverine Epic Collection Vol 4: Escape from Weapon X, and Wolverine Omnibus Vol 1	Sunspot (New Mutants) "The Tender and the Vulgar" Daryl Edelman and John Byrne Collected in Marvel Universe by John Byrne Vol. 2, New Mutants Omnibus Vol 4	Dracula and Nick Fury "Rumanian Rumble" Doug Murray and Tom Lyle	Doctor Strange "A Nightmare on Bleecker Street" Robert Campanella and Steve Geiger
80	Wolverine "Weapon X" Barry Windsor-Smith Collected in Marvel Premiere Classic - Wolverine: Weapon X, Wolverine Epic Collection Vol 4: Escape from Weapon X, and Wolverine Omnibus Vol 1	Captain America "Wargod" Steve Ditko	Daughters of the Dragon "Child's Play" Jo Duffy and Chris Tsuda	Mr. Fantastic "Fantastic Foray" Danny Fingeroth and Dennis Jensen
81	Wolverine "Weapon X" Barry Windsor-Smith Collected in Marvel Premiere Classic - Wolverine: Weapon X, Wolverine Epic Collection Vol 4: Escape from Weapon X, and Wolverine Omnibus Vol 1	Captain America "Wargod" Steve Ditko	Ant-Man "Timebomb" Dana Moreshead and James Fry	Daredevil "The Call" Robert Denatale and Marshall Rogers
82	Wolverine "Weapon X" Barry Windsor-Smith Collected in Marvel Premiere Classic - Wolverine: Weapon X, Wolverine Epic Collection Vol 4: Escape from Weapon X, and Wolverine Omnibus Vol 1	Firestar (New Warriors) "Life During Wartime" Marie Javins, Marcus McLaurin, and Dwayne Turner Collected in X-Men Origins: Firestar	Iron Man "Making Real Progress Bill Mumy and Steve Leialoha	Luke Cage "Hero in Hiding" Marcus McLaurin and Sal Velluto
83	Wolverine "Weapon X" Barry Windsor-Smith Collected in Marvel Premiere Classic - Wolverine: Weapon X, Wolverine Epic Collection Vol 4: Escape from Weapon X, and Wolverine Omnibus Vol 1	Firestar (New Warriors) "Life During Wartime" Marie Javins, Marcus McLaurin, and Dwayne Turner Collected in X-Men Origins: Firestar	Hawkeye "The Distance" Fabian Nicieza and John Stanisci Collected in Hawkeye Epic Collection Vol 3: Marked for Death	Human Torch "The Matchstick and the Moth" Steve Ditko and Erik Larsen
84	Wolverine "Weapon X" Barry Windsor-Smith Collected in Marvel Premiere Classic - Wolverine: Weapon X, Wolverine Epic Collection Vol 4: Escape from Weapon X, and Wolverine Omnibus Vol 1	Firestar (New Warriors) "Life During Wartime" Marie Javins, Marcus McLaurin, and Dwayne Turner Collected in X-Men Origins: Firestar	No C and D stories	
85	Wolverine "Blood Hungry" Peter David and Sam Kieth Collected in Wolverine: Blood Hungry and Wolverine Omnibus Vol 3	Firestar (New Warriors) "Life During Wartime" Marie Javins, Marcus McLaurin, and Dwayne Turner Collected in X-Men Origins: Firestar	Beast (X-Men) "Just Friends" Scott Lobdell, Rob Liefeld, and Jae Lee Collected in X-Factor: The Original X-Men Omnibus Vol. 3; also collected in Marvel Universe by Rob Liefeld Omnibus (#85-86 only),	Speedball "...The Dude in the Really Rad Armor!" Scott Lobdell and Ron Wilson
86	Wolverine "Blood Hungry" Peter David and Sam Kieth Collected in Wolverine: Blood Hungry and Wolverine Omnibus Vol 3	Firestar (New Warriors) "Life During Wartime" Marie Javins, Marcus McLaurin, and Dwayne Turner Collected in X-Men Origins: Firestar	Beast (X-Men) "Just Friends" Scott Lobdell, Rob Liefeld, and Jae Lee Collected in X-Factor: The Original X-Men Omnibus Vol. 3; also collected in Marvel Universe by Rob Liefeld Omnibus (#85-86 only),	Paladin "Take Me Out To the Bomb Game" Eric Fein and J. Adam Walters
87	Wolverine "Blood Hungry" Peter David and Sam Kieth Collected in Wolverine: Blood Hungry and Wolverine Omnibus Vol 3	Firestar (New Warriors) "Life During Wartime" Marie Javins, Marcus McLaurin, and Dwayne Turner Collected in X-Men Origins: Firestar	Beast (X-Men) "Just Friends" Scott Lobdell, Rob Liefeld, and Jae Lee Collected in X-Factor: The Original X-Men Omnibus Vol. 3; also collected in Marvel Universe by Rob Liefeld Omnibus (#85-86 only),	Shroud "To Touch the Darkness" Eric Fein and Ron Wilson
88	Wolverine "Blood Hungry" Peter David and Sam Kieth Collected in Wolverine: Blood Hungry and Wolverine Omnibus Vol 3	Solo "Hero of the People" Eric Fein and Mark Runyan	Beast (X-Men) "Just Friends" Scott Lobdell, Rob Liefeld, and Jae Lee Collected in X-Factor: The Original X-Men Omnibus Vol. 3; also collected in Marvel Universe by Rob Liefeld Omnibus (#85-86 only),	Volcana "Shopping" James Brock
89	Wolverine "Blood Hungry" Peter David and Sam Kieth Collected in Wolverine: Blood Hungry and Wolverine Omnibus Vol 3	Spitfire (Invaders) & Selene (Hellfire Club) "Young Blood" Dan Slott and Rita Fagiani	Beast (X-Men) "Just Friends" Scott Lobdell, Rob Liefeld, and Jae Lee Collected in X-Factor: The Original X-Men Omnibus Vol. 3; also collected in Marvel Universe by Rob Liefeld Omnibus (#85-86 only),	Mojo (X-Men) "What's Wrong With This Picture?" Dan Slott and Joe Madureira Collected in X-Men: Blue & Gold – Mutant Genesis Omnibus
90	Wolverine "Blood Hungry" Peter David and Sam Kieth Collected in Wolverine: Blood Hungry and Wolverine Omnibus Vol 3	Ghost Rider and Cable (X-Force) "Servants of the Dead" Howard Mackie and Guang Yap Collected in Ghost Rider and Cable: Servants of the Dead; Ghost Rider: Danny Ketch Omnibus Vol 1; and Ghost Rider: Danny Ketch Epic Collection Vol 2: Bad to the Bone	Beast (X-Men) "Just Friends" Scott Lobdell, Rob Liefeld, and Jae Lee Collected in X-Factor: The Original X-Men Omnibus Vol. 3; also collected in Marvel Universe by Rob Liefeld Omnibus (#85-86 only),	Nightmare "Fangu Lives!" Steve Buccellato
91	Wolverine "Blood Hungry" Peter David and Sam Kieth Collected in Wolverine: Blood Hungry and Wolverine Omnibus Vol 3	Ghost Rider and Cable (X-Force) "Servants of the Dead" Howard Mackie and Guang Yap Collected in Ghost Rider and Cable: Servants of the Dead; Ghost Rider: Danny Ketch Omnibus Vol 1; and Ghost Rider: Danny Ketch Epic Collection Vol 2: Bad to the Bone	Beast (X-Men) "Just Friends" Scott Lobdell, Rob Liefeld, and Jae Lee Collected in X-Factor: The Original X-Men Omnibus Vol. 3; also collected in Marvel Universe by Rob Liefeld Omnibus (#85-86 only),	Impossible Man and Daredevil "Truth or Daredevil" Dave Manak
92	Wolverine "Blood Hungry" Peter David and Sam Kieth Collected in Wolverine: Blood Hungry and Wolverine Omnibus Vol 3	Ghost Rider and Cable (X-Force) "Servants of the Dead" Howard Mackie and Guang Yap Collected in Ghost Rider and Cable: Servants of the Dead; Ghost Rider: Danny Ketch Omnibus Vol 1; and Ghost Rider: Danny Ketch Epic Collection Vol 2: Bad to the Bone	Beast (X-Men) "Just Friends" Scott Lobdell, Rob Liefeld, and Jae Lee Collected in X-Factor: The Original X-Men Omnibus Vol. 3; also collected in Marvel Universe by Rob Liefeld Omnibus (#85-86 only),	Northstar (Alpha Flight) "Separate Allies" Karl Bollers, Antonio Matias and Joe Madureira
93	Wolverine "Wild Frontier" Timothy Truman and Todd Foxx Collected in Wolverine: Prehistory and Wolverine Omnibus Vol 3	Ghost Rider and Cable (X-Force) "Servants of the Dead" Howard Mackie and Guang Yap Collected in Ghost Rider and Cable: Servants of the Dead; Ghost Rider: Danny Ketch Omnibus Vol 1; and Ghost Rider: Danny Ketch Epic Collection Vol 2: Bad to the Bone	Nova (Frankie Raye) "And Ye Shall Remember This" Susan Kennedy and Gavin Curtis Collected in Silver Surfer Epic Collection: The Infinity Gauntlet and Silver Surfer: The Infinity Gauntlet Omnibus	Daredevil and Black Widow "Split Seconds" Dan Slott and Dwayne Turner Collected in Black Widow: Marvel Team-Up
94	Wolverine "Wild Frontier" Timothy Truman and Todd Foxx Collected in Wolverine: Prehistory and Wolverine Omnibus Vol 3	Ghost Rider and Cable (X-Force) "Servants of the Dead" Howard Mackie and Guang Yap Collected in Ghost Rider and Cable: Servants of the Dead; Ghost Rider: Danny Ketch Omnibus Vol 1; and Ghost Rider: Danny Ketch Epic Collection Vol 2: Bad to the Bone	Nova (Frankie Raye) "And Ye Shall Remember This" Susan Kennedy and Gavin Curtis Collected in Silver Surfer Epic Collection: The Infinity Gauntlet and Silver Surfer: The Infinity Gauntlet Omnibus	Thing "Grimm's Tale" John Figueroa and Ron Wilson
95	Wolverine "Wild Frontier" Timothy Truman and Todd Foxx Collected in Wolverine: Prehistory and Wolverine Omnibus Vol 3	Ghost Rider and Cable (X-Force) "Servants of the Dead" Howard Mackie and Guang Yap Collected in Ghost Rider and Cable: Servants of the Dead; Ghost Rider: Danny Ketch Omnibus Vol 1; and Ghost Rider: Danny Ketch Epic Collection Vol 2: Bad to the Bone	Nova (Frankie Raye) "And Ye Shall Remember This" Susan Kennedy and Gavin Curtis Collected in Silver Surfer Epic Collection: The Infinity Gauntlet and Silver Surfer: The Infinity Gauntlet Omnibus	Mr. Fixit (Hulk) "Heroes" Danny Fingeroth and Vince Evans
96	Wolverine "Wild Frontier" Timothy Truman and Todd Foxx Collected in Wolverine: Prehistory and Wolverine Omnibus Vol 3	Ghost Rider and Cable (X-Force) "Servants of the Dead" Howard Mackie and Guang Yap Collected in Ghost Rider and Cable: Servants of the Dead; Ghost Rider: Danny Ketch Omnibus Vol 1; and Ghost Rider: Danny Ketch Epic Collection Vol 2: Bad to the Bone	Nova (Frankie Raye) "And Ye Shall Remember This" Susan Kennedy and Gavin Curtis Collected in Silver Surfer Epic Collection: The Infinity Gauntlet and Silver Surfer: The Infinity Gauntlet Omnibus	Speedball "Class Clown" Scott Lobdell and Dennis Jensen
97	Wolverine "Wild Frontier" Timothy Truman and Todd Foxx Collected in Wolverine: Prehistory and Wolverine Omnibus Vol 3	Ghost Rider and Cable (X-Force) "Servants of the Dead" Howard Mackie and Guang Yap Collected in Ghost Rider and Cable: Servants of the Dead; Ghost Rider: Danny Ketch Omnibus Vol 1; and Ghost Rider: Danny Ketch Epic Collection Vol 2: Bad to the Bone	Silver Surfer "Collision Course" John Figueroa and Ron Wilson Collected in Silver Surfer Epic Collection: The Infinity Gauntlet and Silver Surfer: The Infinity Gauntlet Omnibus	Angar the Screamer "Where Everyone Knows Your Alias" Sholly Fisch and Mark Bagley
98	Wolverine "Wild Frontier" Timothy Truman and Todd Foxx Collected in Wolverine: Prehistory and Wolverine Omnibus Vol 3	Ghost Rider "D'Spryte Times, D'Spryte Measures" Dan Slott and Jimmy Palmiotti Collected in Ghost Rider: Danny Ketch Omnibus Vol 1	Werewolf by Night "Wild at Heart" Len Kaminski and S. Clarke Hawbaker	Gladiator (Daredevil character) "Worthy of the Name" Scott Benson and John Stanisci
99	Wolverine "Hauntings" Rob Liefeld, Howard Mackie, and Jim Valentino Collected in Wolverine Omnibus Vol 3 and Marvel Universe by Rob Liefeld Omnibus	Ghost Rider "D'Spryte Times, D'Spryte Measures" Dan Slott and Jimmy Palmiotti Collected in Ghost Rider: Danny Ketch Omnibus Vol 1	Puck (Alpha Flight) "Razer's Edge" Paula Foye, Raz Mesinai and Joe Madureira	Spider-Man "Has Anybody Seen My Gal" Susan Kennedy and Malcolm Davis
100	Dr. Doom, Nightmare, Ghost Rider, Wolverine "Dreams of Doom" Howard Mackie and Sam Kieth Collected in Wolverine Omnibus Vol 3, Ghost Rider: Danny Ketch Omnibus Vol 1 and Ghost Rider: Danny Ketch Epic Collection Vol 2: Bad to the Bone			
101	Wolverine and Nightcrawler "Male Bonding" Scott Lobdell and Gene Colan Collected in Wolverine Omnibus Vol 3	The Young Gods "Against a Rogue God" Gerry Conway and Tom Sutton	Ghost Rider and Doctor Strange "Doorway to Darkness" Howard Mackie and Rick Leonardi Collected in Ghost Rider: Danny Ketch Omnibus Vol 1 and Ghost Rider: Danny Ketch Epic Collection Vol 3: Rise of the Midnight Sons	Punisher "Vices" Ron Marz and Scott Kollins
102	Wolverine and Nightcrawler "Male Bonding" Scott Lobdell and Gene Colan Collected in Wolverine Omnibus Vol 3	The Young Gods "Against a Rogue God" Gerry Conway and Tom Sutton	Ghost Rider and Doctor Strange "Doorway to Darkness" Howard Mackie and Rick Leonardi Collected in Ghost Rider: Danny Ketch Omnibus Vol 1 and Ghost Rider: Danny Ketch Epic Collection Vol 3: Rise of the Midnight Sons	Phantom Rider "Stunt Show" Gary Barnum and Dave Hoover
103	Wolverine and Nightcrawler "Male Bonding" Scott Lobdell and Gene Colan Collected in Wolverine Omnibus Vol 3	The Young Gods "Against a Rogue God" Gerry Conway and Tom Sutton	Ghost Rider and Doctor Strange "Doorway to Darkness" Howard Mackie and Rick Leonardi Collected in Ghost Rider: Danny Ketch Omnibus Vol 1 and Ghost Rider: Danny Ketch Epic Collection Vol 3: Rise of the Midnight Sons	Rintrah "Stage Fright" James Felder and Larry Alexander
104	Wolverine and Nightcrawler "Male Bonding" Scott Lobdell and Gene Colan Collected in Wolverine Omnibus Vol 3	The Young Gods "Against a Rogue God" Gerry Conway and Tom Sutton	Ghost Rider and Doctor Strange "Doorway to Darkness" Howard Mackie and Rick Leonardi Collected in Ghost Rider: Danny Ketch Omnibus Vol 1 and Ghost Rider: Danny Ketch Epic Collection Vol 3: Rise of the Midnight Sons	U.S. Agent "Fight the Right Thing" Scott Lobdell, Paula Foye and Paul Abrams
105	Wolverine and Nightcrawler "Male Bonding" Scott Lobdell and Gene Colan Collected in Wolverine Omnibus Vol 3	The Young Gods "Against a Rogue God" Gerry Conway and Tom Sutton	Ghost Rider and Doctor Strange "Doorway to Darkness" Howard Mackie and Rick Leonardi Collected in Ghost Rider: Danny Ketch Omnibus Vol 1 and Ghost Rider: Danny Ketch Epic Collection Vol 3: Rise of the Midnight Sons	Thing "Crystal Quest" Skip Dietz and Joel Zulueta
106	Wolverine and Nightcrawler "Male Bonding" Scott Lobdell and Gene Colan Collected in Wolverine Omnibus Vol 3	The Young Gods "Against a Rogue God" Gerry Conway and Tom Sutton	Ghost Rider and Doctor Strange "Doorway to Darkness" Howard Mackie and Rick Leonardi Collected in Ghost Rider: Danny Ketch Omnibus Vol 1 and Ghost Rider: Danny Ketch Epic Collection Vol 3: Rise of the Midnight Sons	Devil-Hunter "One Nation Under Hades" Robert Campanella and Bret Blevins
107	Wolverine and Nightcrawler "Male Bonding" Scott Lobdell and Gene Colan Collected in Wolverine Omnibus Vol 3	The Young Gods "Against a Rogue God" Gerry Conway and Tom Sutton	Ghost Rider and Werewolf by Night "Return of the Braineaters" Chris Cooper and John Stanisci Collected in Ghost Rider: Danny Ketch Omnibus Vol 1	Red Wolf "Fuel for the Fire" Fabian Nicieza and James Blackburn
108	Wolverine and Nightcrawler "Male Bonding" Scott Lobdell and Gene Colan Collected in Wolverine Omnibus Vol 3	The Young Gods "Against a Rogue God" Gerry Conway and Tom Sutton	Ghost Rider and Werewolf by Night "Return of the Braineaters" Chris Cooper and John Stanisci Collected in Ghost Rider: Danny Ketch Omnibus Vol 1	Thanos "I Thanos" Jim Starlin and Larry Alexander Collected in Infinity War and Infinity War Omnibus
109	Wolverine "Typhoid's Kiss" Ann Nocenti and Steve Lightle Collected in Wolverine: Typhoid's Kiss, Daredevil: Typhoid's Kiss, Daredevil by Nocenti & Romita Jr. Omnibus Vol. 2, and Wolverine Omnibus Vol. 4	The Young Gods "Against a Rogue God" Gerry Conway and Tom Sutton	Ghost Rider and Werewolf by Night "Return of the Braineaters" Chris Cooper and John Stanisci Collected in Ghost Rider: Danny Ketch Omnibus Vol 1	Thanos "I Thanos" Jim Starlin and Larry Alexander Collected in Infinity War and Infinity War Omnibus
110	Wolverine "Typhoid's Kiss" Ann Nocenti and Steve Lightle Collected in Wolverine: Typhoid's Kiss, Daredevil: Typhoid's Kiss, Daredevil by Nocenti & Romita Jr. Omnibus Vol. 2, and Wolverine Omnibus Vol. 4	Nightcrawler (Excalibur) "Night of the Ripper" Barry Dutter and Mark Runyan Collected in Excalibur Omnibus Vol. 2 and Excalibur Epic Collection: Curiouser and Curiouser	Ghost Rider and Werewolf by Night "Return of the Braineaters" Chris Cooper and John Stanisci Collected in Ghost Rider: Danny Ketch Omnibus Vol 1	Thanos "I Thanos" Jim Starlin and Larry Alexander Collected in Infinity War and Infinity War Omnibus
111	Wolverine "Typhoid's Kiss" Ann Nocenti and Steve Lightle Collected in Wolverine: Typhoid's Kiss, Daredevil: Typhoid's Kiss, Daredevil by Nocenti & Romita Jr. Omnibus Vol. 2, and Wolverine Omnibus Vol. 4	Iron Fist "Menace of the Mad Abbot" Joey Cavalieri and Alexander Morrissey Collected in Iron Fist: Book of Changes	Ghost Rider and Werewolf by Night "Return of the Braineaters" Chris Cooper and John Stanisci Collected in Ghost Rider: Danny Ketch Omnibus Vol 1	Thanos "I Thanos" Jim Starlin and Larry Alexander Collected in Infinity War and Infinity War Omnibus
112	Wolverine "Typhoid's Kiss" Ann Nocenti and Steve Lightle Collected in Wolverine: Typhoid's Kiss, Daredevil: Typhoid's Kiss, Daredevil by Nocenti & Romita Jr. Omnibus Vol. 2, and Wolverine Omnibus Vol. 4	Demogoblin "Demogoblin's Lament" Danny Fingeroth and Gene Colan	Ghost Rider and Werewolf by Night "Return of the Braineaters" Chris Cooper and John Stanisci Collected in Ghost Rider: Danny Ketch Omnibus Vol 1	Pip the Troll (Infinity Watch) "Picnic" Jim Starlin and Rita Fagiani Collected in Infinity War: Aftermath and Infinity War Omnibus
113	Wolverine "Typhoid's Kiss" Ann Nocenti and Steve Lightle Collected in Wolverine: Typhoid's Kiss, Daredevil: Typhoid's Kiss, Daredevil by Nocenti & Romita Jr. Omnibus Vol. 2, and Wolverine Omnibus Vol. 4	Giant Man (Bill Forster) "Rest and Sweet Glory" Dwayne McDuffie and Ron Wilson	Ghost Rider and Iron Fist "Legion of Vengeance" Joey Cavalieri and Shawn McManus Collected in Iron Fist: Book of Changes and Ghost Rider: Danny Ketch Omnibus Vol 1	Werewolf By Night "Mercy Mission" Len Kaminski and Vince Mielcarek
114	Wolverine "Typhoid's Kiss" Ann Nocenti and Steve Lightle Collected in Wolverine: Typhoid's Kiss, Daredevil: Typhoid's Kiss, Daredevil by Nocenti & Romita Jr. Omnibus Vol. 2, and Wolverine Omnibus Vol. 4	Giant Man (Bill Forster) "Rest and Sweet Glory" Dwayne McDuffie and Ron Wilson	Ghost Rider and Iron Fist "Legion of Vengeance" Joey Cavalieri and Shawn McManus Collected in Iron Fist: Book of Changes and Ghost Rider: Danny Ketch Omnibus Vol 1	Arabian Knight "Bazaar Tales" Gary Barnum and James Blackburn
115	Wolverine "Typhoid's Kiss" Ann Nocenti and Steve Lightle Collected in Wolverine: Typhoid's Kiss, Daredevil: Typhoid's Kiss, Daredevil by Nocenti & Romita Jr. Omnibus Vol. 2, and Wolverine Omnibus Vol. 4	Giant Man (Bill Forster) "Rest and Sweet Glory" Dwayne McDuffie and Ron Wilson	Ghost Rider and Iron Fist "Legion of Vengeance" Joey Cavalieri and Shawn McManus Collected in Iron Fist: Book of Changes and Ghost Rider: Danny Ketch Omnibus Vol 1	Cloak and Dagger "At the Dark End of the Street" Eric Fein and John Stanisci
116	Wolverine "Typhoid's Kiss" Ann Nocenti and Steve Lightle Collected in Wolverine: Typhoid's Kiss, Daredevil: Typhoid's Kiss, Daredevil by Nocenti & Romita Jr. Omnibus Vol. 2, and Wolverine Omnibus Vol. 4	Giant Man (Bill Forster) "Rest and Sweet Glory" Dwayne McDuffie and Ron Wilson	Ghost Rider and Iron Fist "Legion of Vengeance" Joey Cavalieri and Shawn McManus Collected in Iron Fist: Book of Changes and Ghost Rider: Danny Ketch Omnibus Vol 1	Two-Gun Kid "Just Desserts" Dan Slott and Gil Kane
117	Wolverine and Venom "Dream a Little Dream... of Me" Howard Mackie and Sam Kieth Collected in Wolverine vs. the Marvel Universe, Venom Epic Collection: Lethal Protector, Spider-Man vs. Venom Omnibus and Wolverine Omnibus Vol. 4	Giant Man (Bill Forster) "Rest and Sweet Glory" Dwayne McDuffie and Ron Wilson	Ghost Rider and Iron Fist "Legion of Vengeance" Joey Cavalieri and Shawn McManus Collected in Iron Fist: Book of Changes and Ghost Rider: Danny Ketch Omnibus Vol 1	Ravage 2099 "This Madness Unleashed" Stan Lee and Paul Ryan
118	Wolverine and Venom "Dream a Little Dream... of Me" Howard Mackie and Sam Kieth Collected in Wolverine vs. the Marvel Universe, Venom Epic Collection: Lethal Protector, Spider-Man vs. Venom Omnibus and Wolverine Omnibus Vol. 4	Giant Man (Bill Forster) "Rest and Sweet Glory" Dwayne McDuffie and Ron Wilson	Ghost Rider and Iron Fist "Legion of Vengeance" Joey Cavalieri and Shawn McManus Collected in Iron Fist: Book of Changes and Ghost Rider: Danny Ketch Omnibus Vol 1	Doom 2099 "Muses of Fire" John Francis Moore and Pat Broderick
119	Wolverine and Venom "Dream a Little Dream... of Me" Howard Mackie and Sam Kieth Collected in Wolverine vs. the Marvel Universe, Venom Epic Collection: Lethal Protector, Spider-Man vs. Venom Omnibus and Wolverine Omnibus Vol. 4	Ghost Rider and Cloak and Dagger "And Let There Be Light" Paula Foye and Alexander Morrissey Collected in Ghost Rider: Danny Ketch Omnibus Vol 2	Constrictor "Doin' the Toe Jam" Paula Foye and Mark Powers	Wonder Man "The Exclusive" Dan Slott and Pete McDonnell
120	Wolverine and Venom "Dream a Little Dream... of Me" Howard Mackie and Sam Kieth Collected in Wolverine vs. the Marvel Universe, Venom Epic Collection: Lethal Protector, Spider-Man vs. Venom Omnibus and Wolverine Omnibus Vol. 4	Ghost Rider and Cloak and Dagger "And Let There Be Light" Paula Foye and Alexander Morrissey Collected in Ghost Rider: Danny Ketch Omnibus Vol 2	Constrictor "Doin' the Toe Jam" Paula Foye and Mark Powers	Spider-Man "Along Came a Child" Keith Planit and Ed Murr
121	Wolverine and Venom "Dream a Little Dream... of Me" Howard Mackie and Sam Kieth Collected in Wolverine vs. the Marvel Universe, Venom Epic Collection: Lethal Protector, Spider-Man vs. Venom Omnibus and Wolverine Omnibus Vol. 4	Ghost Rider and Cloak and Dagger "And Let There Be Light" Paula Foye and Alexander Morrissey Collected in Ghost Rider: Danny Ketch Omnibus Vol 2	Mirage (X-Force) "Of Faith and Fable" Jaye Gardner and Joe Madureira Collected in New Mutants Omnibus Vol 4	Andromeda "Civil Disabilities" Karl Bollers and Mark Moretti
122	Wolverine and Venom "Dream a Little Dream... of Me" Howard Mackie and Sam Kieth Collected in Wolverine vs. the Marvel Universe, Venom Epic Collection: Lethal Protector, Spider-Man vs. Venom Omnibus and Wolverine Omnibus Vol. 4	Ghost Rider and Cloak and Dagger "And Let There Be Light" Paula Foye and Alexander Morrissey Collected in Ghost Rider: Danny Ketch Omnibus Vol 2	Knights of Pendragon "Seeds of Winter" Skip Dietz and Hoang Nguyen Collected in Knights of Pendragon Omnibus	Speedball "Taped Confessions" Fabien Nicieza and Paris Karounos Collected in New Warriors Omnibus Vol 2
123	Wolverine "Passion Play" Scott Lobdell and Dennis Jensen Collected in Wolverine Omnibus Vol. 4	She-Hulk "Adrenazon's Revenge" Kelly Corvese and Dave Hoover Collected in She-Hulk Epic Collection Vol 6: To Live and Die in LA	Ghost Rider "The Walking Wounded" Ann Nocenti and Steve Lightle Collected in Daredevil: Typhoid's Kiss; Daredevil by Nocenti & Romita Jr. Omnibus Vol. 2; and Ghost Rider: Danny Ketch Omnibus Vol 2	Master Man "The Doomed Man" Scott Kollins
124	Wolverine "Passion Play" Scott Lobdell and Dennis Jensen Collected in Wolverine Omnibus Vol. 4	She-Hulk "Adrenazon's Revenge" Kelly Corvese and Dave Hoover Collected in She-Hulk Epic Collection Vol 6: To Live and Die in LA	Ghost Rider "The Walking Wounded" Ann Nocenti and Steve Lightle Collected in Daredevil: Typhoid's Kiss; Daredevil by Nocenti & Romita Jr. Omnibus Vol. 2; and Ghost Rider: Danny Ketch Omnibus Vol 2	Solo "Death Flight" Eric Fein and Mark Bagley
125	Wolverine "Passion Play" Scott Lobdell and Dennis Jensen Collected in Wolverine Omnibus Vol. 4	She-Hulk "Adrenazon's Revenge" Kelly Corvese and Dave Hoover Collected in She-Hulk Epic Collection Vol 6: To Live and Die in LA	Ghost Rider "The Walking Wounded" Ann Nocenti and Steve Lightle Collected in Daredevil: Typhoid's Kiss; Daredevil by Nocenti & Romita Jr. Omnibus Vol. 2; and Ghost Rider: Danny Ketch Omnibus Vol 2	Iron Fist "The Book of Changes" Joey Cavalieri and Dave Hoover Collected in Iron Fist: Book of Changes
126	Wolverine "Passion Play" Scott Lobdell and Dennis Jensen Collected in Wolverine Omnibus Vol. 4	She-Hulk "Adrenazon's Revenge" Kelly Corvese and Dave Hoover Collected in She-Hulk Epic Collection Vol 6: To Live and Die in LA	Ghost Rider "The Walking Wounded" Ann Nocenti and Steve Lightle Collected in Daredevil: Typhoid's Kiss; Daredevil by Nocenti & Romita Jr. Omnibus Vol. 2; and Ghost Rider: Danny Ketch Omnibus Vol 2	Iron Fist "The Book of Changes" Joey Cavalieri and Dave Hoover Collected in Iron Fist: Book of Changes
127	Wolverine "Passion Play" Scott Lobdell and Dennis Jensen Collected in Wolverine Omnibus Vol. 4	Speedball "The Big Time" Danny Fingeroth and Don Perlin	Ghost Rider "The Walking Wounded" Ann Nocenti and Steve Lightle Collected in Daredevil: Typhoid's Kiss; Daredevil by Nocenti & Romita Jr. Omnibus Vol. 2; and Ghost Rider: Danny Ketch Omnibus Vol 2	Iron Fist "The Book of Changes" Joey Cavalieri and Dave Hoover Collected in Iron Fist: Book of Changes
128	Wolverine "Passion Play" Scott Lobdell and Dennis Jensen Collected in Wolverine Omnibus Vol. 4	American Eagle "The Hunter and the Hunted" John Figueroa and Ron Wilson	Ghost Rider "The Walking Wounded" Ann Nocenti and Steve Lightle Collected in Daredevil: Typhoid's Kiss; Daredevil by Nocenti & Romita Jr. Omnibus Vol. 2; and Ghost Rider: Danny Ketch Omnibus Vol 2	Iron Fist "The Book of Changes" Joey Cavalieri and Dave Hoover Collected in Iron Fist: Book of Changes
129	Wolverine "Passion Play" Scott Lobdell and Dennis Jensen Collected in Wolverine Omnibus Vol. 4	Crossbones "A Time To Die" John Figueroa and Ron Wilson	Ghost Rider "The Walking Wounded" Ann Nocenti and Steve Lightle Collected in Daredevil: Typhoid's Kiss; Daredevil by Nocenti & Romita Jr. Omnibus Vol. 2; and Ghost Rider: Danny Ketch Omnibus Vol 2	Iron Fist "The Book of Changes" Joey Cavalieri and Dave Hoover Collected in Iron Fist: Book of Changes
130	Wolverine "Passion Play" Scott Lobdell and Dennis Jensen Collected in Wolverine Omnibus Vol. 4	American Eagle "Screams" John Figueroa and Ron Wilson	Ghost Rider "The Walking Wounded" Ann Nocenti and Steve Lightle Collected in Daredevil: Typhoid's Kiss; Daredevil by Nocenti & Romita Jr. Omnibus Vol. 2; and Ghost Rider: Danny Ketch Omnibus Vol 2	Iron Fist "The Book of Changes" Joey Cavalieri and Dave Hoover Collected in Iron Fist: Book of Changes
131	Wolverine "These Foolish Things" James Felder and Dennis Jensen Collected in Wolverine Omnibus Vol. 4	Ghost Rider and Luke Cage "Heart and Soul" Karl Bollers and Freddy Mendez Collected in Ghost Rider: Danny Ketch Omnibus Vol 3	Ant-Man "Late for Supper" Sandy Plunkett	Iron Fist "The Book of Changes" Joey Cavalieri and Dave Hoover Collected in Iron Fist: Book of Changes
132	Wolverine "Brothers in Arms" Dan Slott and Steve Lightle Collected in Wolverine Omnibus Vol. 4	Ghost Rider and Luke Cage "Heart and Soul" Karl Bollers and Freddy Mendez Collected in Ghost Rider: Danny Ketch Omnibus Vol 3	Iron Man "Novel Approach" Glenn Greenberg and Paris Karounos	Iron Fist "The Book of Changes" Joey Cavalieri and Dave Hoover Collected in Iron Fist: Book of Changes
133	Wolverine "Brothers in Arms" Dan Slott and Steve Lightle Collected in Wolverine Omnibus Vol. 4	Ghost Rider and Luke Cage "Heart and Soul" Karl Bollers and Freddy Mendez Collected in Ghost Rider: Danny Ketch Omnibus Vol 3	Cloak and Dagger "Nocturnal Cravings" Chuck Kim and Walter McDaniel	Iron Fist "Depths of Despair" Tony Matias and Fred Haynes Collected in Iron Fist: Book of Changes
134	Wolverine "Brothers in Arms" Dan Slott and Steve Lightle Collected in Wolverine Omnibus Vol. 4	Ghost Rider and Luke Cage "Heart and Soul" Karl Bollers and Freddy Mendez Collected in Ghost Rider: Danny Ketch Omnibus Vol 3	Major Victory (Guardians of the Galaxy) "True Love" Mariano Nicieza and Fred Mendez	Iron Fist "Depths of Despair" Tony Matias and Fred Haynes Collected in Iron Fist: Book of Changes
135	Wolverine "Brothers in Arms" Dan Slott and Steve Lightle Collected in Wolverine Omnibus Vol. 4	Ghost Rider and Luke Cage "Heart and Soul" Karl Bollers and Freddy Mendez Collected in Ghost Rider: Danny Ketch Omnibus Vol 3	Black Widow "Legacy" Mindy Newell and John Stanisci Collected in Black Widow Epic Collection: The Coldest War and The Black Widow Strikes! Omnibus	Iron Fist "Depths of Despair" Tony Matias and Fred Haynes Collected in Iron Fist: Book of Changes
136	Wolverine "Brothers in Arms" Dan Slott and Steve Lightle Collected in Wolverine Omnibus Vol. 4	Ghost Rider and Luke Cage "Heart and Soul" Karl Bollers and Freddy Mendez Collected in Ghost Rider: Danny Ketch Omnibus Vol 3	Daredevil "The Prisoner" Michael Higgins and Mark Powers	Iron Fist "Depths of Despair" Tony Matias and Fred Haynes Collected in Iron Fist: Book of Changes
137	Wolverine "Rumble in the Jungle" Erik Larsen and Chris Marrinan Collected in Wolverine Omnibus Vol. 4	Ghost Rider "Fellow Travellers" Len Kaminski and Reggie Jones Collected in Ghost Rider: Danny Ketch Omnibus Vol 3	Ant-Man "Giant Trouble" Barry Dutter and Patrick Archibald	Iron Fist "The Highwayman Comes Riding to Town" Joey Cavalieri and James Blackburn Collected in Iron Fist: Book of Changes
138	Wolverine "Rumble in the Jungle" Erik Larsen and Chris Marrinan Collected in Wolverine Omnibus Vol. 4	Ghost Rider "Fellow Travellers" Len Kaminski and Reggie Jones Collected in Ghost Rider: Danny Ketch Omnibus Vol 3	Spellbound "Zxaxz's Escape" Bobbie Chase and Terry Shoemaker	Spider-Man "Deathurge" Matt Idelson and Malcolm Jones
139	Wolverine "Rumble in the Jungle" Erik Larsen and Chris Marrinan Collected in Wolverine Omnibus Vol. 4	Ghost Rider "Fellow Travellers" Len Kaminski and Reggie Jones Collected in Ghost Rider: Danny Ketch Omnibus Vol 3	Spellbound "Zxaxz's Escape" Bobbie Chase and Terry Shoemaker	Batroc the Leaper "Feat First" Mike Lackey and Pedi
140	Wolverine "Rumble in the Jungle" Erik Larsen and Chris Marrinan Collected in Wolverine Omnibus Vol. 4	Ghost Rider "Fellow Travellers" Len Kaminski and Reggie Jones Collected in Ghost Rider: Danny Ketch Omnibus Vol 3	Spellbound "Zxaxz's Escape" Bobbie Chase and Terry Shoemaker	Iron Fist "End Run" John Figueroa and Ron Wilson Collected in Iron Fist: Book of Changes
141	Wolverine "Rumble in the Jungle" Erik Larsen and Chris Marrinan Collected in Wolverine Omnibus Vol. 4	Ghost Rider "Fellow Travellers" Len Kaminski and Reggie Jones Collected in Ghost Rider: Danny Ketch Omnibus Vol 3	Spellbound "Zxaxz's Escape" Bobbie Chase and Terry Shoemaker	Iron Fist "House of Rave" John Figueroa and Robert Davis Collected in Iron Fist: Book of Changes
142	Wolverine "Rumble in the Jungle" Erik Larsen and Chris Marrinan Collected in Wolverine Omnibus Vol. 4	Ghost Rider "Fellow Travellers" Len Kaminski and Reggie Jones Collected in Ghost Rider: Danny Ketch Omnibus Vol 3	Spellbound "Zxaxz's Escape" Bobbie Chase and Terry Shoemaker	Alex Grimond "Foreign Soil" Simon Furman and Derek Yaniger
143	Ghost Rider "Treachery" Chris Cooper and Reggie Jones Collected in Ghost Rider: Danny Ketch Epic Collection Vol. 6 Siege of Darkness, and Ghost Rider: Danny Ketch Omnibus Vol 3	Scarlet Witch "Digital Terror!" Cefn Ridout and Charles Adlard Collected in Avengers: Scarlet Witch, Avengers: The Death of Mockingbird, and Ghost Rider: Danny Ketch Omnibus Vol 3	Werewolf by Night "Little Monsters" Len Kaminski and James Fry Collected in Ghost Rider: Danny Ketch Omnibus Vol 3	Devil-Slayer "Out of Time, In the Time-Out Hotel" John Babcock and Darren Auck Collected in Ghost Rider: Danny Ketch Omnibus Vol 3
144	Ghost Rider "Treachery" Chris Cooper and Reggie Jones Collected in Ghost Rider: Danny Ketch Epic Collection Vol. 6 Siege of Darkness, and Ghost Rider: Danny Ketch Omnibus Vol 3	Scarlet Witch "Digital Terror!" Cefn Ridout and Charles Adlard Collected in Avengers: Scarlet Witch, Avengers: The Death of Mockingbird, and Ghost Rider: Danny Ketch Omnibus Vol 3	Werewolf by Night "Stage Fright" Len Kaminski and James Fry Collected in Ghost Rider: Danny Ketch Omnibus Vol 3	Morbius / Midnight Sons "Like Family, Like Enemy" Greg Wight, M.C. Wyman Collected in Ghost Rider: Danny Ketch Omnibus Vol 3
145	Ghost Rider "Speakeasy" Chris Cooper and Reggie Jones Collected in Ghost Rider: Danny Ketch Epic Collection Vol. 6 Siege of Darkness, and Ghost Rider: Danny Ketch Omnibus Vol 3	Blade "Dust" Steven Grant and Lawrence Brown Collected in Ghost Rider: Danny Ketch Omnibus Vol 3	Darkhold Redeemers "White Letter" Chris Cooper and Reggie Jones Collected in Darkhold: Pages from the Book of Sins, and Ghost Rider: Danny Ketch Omnibus Vol 3	Morbius "Casualties of War" Greg Wight, M.C. Wyman Collected in Ghost Rider: Danny Ketch Omnibus Vol 3
146	Ghost Rider "Masks" Chris Cooper and Reggie Jones Collected in Ghost Rider: Danny Ketch Epic Collection Vol. 6 Siege of Darkness, and Ghost Rider: Danny Ketch Omnibus Vol 3	Nightstalkers "Ashes" Steven Grant and Lawrence Brown Collected in Ghost Rider: Danny Ketch Omnibus Vol 3	Dr. Strange "Salome's Dream" David Quinn and Geof Isherwood Collected in Doctor Strange Epic Collection: Nightmare on Bleecker Street and Ghost Rider: Danny Ketch Omnibus Vol 3	Devil-Slayer "Temptation" John Babcock and Darren Auck Collected in Ghost Rider: Danny Ketch Omnibus Vol 3
147	Vengeance "Tower of Blood" Chris Cooper and Reggie Jones Collected in Marvel Firsts: The 1990s Omnibus Vol. 2 (#147 only)	Masters of Silence "Serpent's Teeth" Len Kaminski and David Cullen	Falcon "Legacy" Mariano Nicieza and Steve Lieber	American Eagle "Saints and Sinner" John Figueroa and Ron Wilson
148	Vengeance "Tower of Blood" Chris Cooper and Reggie Jones Collected in Marvel Firsts: The 1990s Omnibus Vol. 2 (#147 only)	Captain Universe "Hearts and Minds" Dan Slott and Bill Wiley Collected in Captain Universe: Power Unimaginable	Black Panther "Triumph of the Hunter" Don Hillsman Collected in Black Panther Epic Collection: Panther's Prey and Black Panther Omnibus: Revenge of the Black Panther	American Eagle "500 Guns" John Figueroa and Ron Wilson
149	Vengeance "The Price" Chris Cooper and Fred Harper	Daughters of the Dragon "Til Death Do Us Part" Floyd Hughes and Reggie Jones	Sub-Mariner "Diver Down" John Figueroa and Phil Felix	Starjammers "Beyond the Call" Kelly Corvese and Alexander Morrissey
150	Wolverine, Vengeance, Daredevil, and Typhoid Mary "Bloody Mary" Ann Nocenti and Steve Lightle Collected in Daredevil: Typhoid's Kiss, Daredevil by Nocenti & Romita Jr. Omnibus Vol. 2, and Wolverine Omnibus Vol 5			
151	Wolverine, Vengeance, Daredevil, and Typhoid Mary "Bloody Mary" Ann Nocenti and Steve Lightle Collected in Daredevil: Typhoid's Kiss, Daredevil by Nocenti & Romita Jr. Omnibus Vol. 2, and Wolverine Omnibus Vol 5			
152	Wolverine "Pure Sacrifice" Dwight Zimmerman, Nelson Yomtov, and Paul Ryan Collected in Wolverine Omnibus Vol 5	Vengeance "Dangerous Games" Chris Cooper and Reggie Jones	War Machine "The Dying Game" Len Kaminski, Scott Benson and John Czop	Moon Knight "Hung Jury" Chuck Dixon and J.J. Birch Collected in Moon Knight Epic Collection Vol 7: Death Watch and Moon Knight: Marc Spector Omnibus Vol 2
153	Wolverine "Pure Sacrifice" Dwight Zimmerman, Nelson Yomtov, and Paul Ryan Collected in Wolverine Omnibus Vol 5	Vengeance "Dangerous Games" Chris Cooper and Reggie Jones	War Machine "The Dying Game" Len Kaminski, Scott Benson and John Czop	Moon Knight "Hung Jury" Chuck Dixon and J.J. Birch Collected in Moon Knight Epic Collection Vol 7: Death Watch and Moon Knight: Marc Spector Omnibus Vol 2
154	Wolverine "Pure Sacrifice" Dwight Zimmerman, Nelson Yomtov, and Paul Ryan Collected in Wolverine Omnibus Vol 5	Vengeance "Dangerous Games" Chris Cooper and Reggie Jones	War Machine "The Dying Game" Len Kaminski, Scott Benson and John Czop	Moon Knight "Hung Jury" Chuck Dixon and J.J. Birch Collected in Moon Knight Epic Collection Vol 7: Death Watch and Moon Knight: Marc Spector Omnibus Vol 2
155	Wolverine "Pure Sacrifice" Dwight Zimmerman, Nelson Yomtov, and Paul Ryan Collected in Wolverine Omnibus Vol 5	Vengeance "Dangerous Games" Chris Cooper and Reggie Jones	War Machine "The Dying Game" Len Kaminski, Scott Benson and John Czop	New Warriors "Matrix Syndrome" Ed Lazellari Collected in New Warriors Omnibus Vol 3
156	Vengeance "Altered Spirits" Chris Cooper and Reggie Jones	Shang-Chi "The Gauntlet" Karl Bollers and Cary Nord	Destroyer "Enis Nacht" Dan Slott and James Fry	New Warriors "Matrix Syndrome" Ed Lazellari Collected in New Warriors Omnibus Vol 3
157	Vengeance "Altered Spirits" Chris Cooper and Reggie Jones	Shang-Chi "The Gauntlet" Karl Bollers and Cary Nord	Nick Fury "Jury of Your Peers" Mariano Nicieza and Kris Renkewitz	New Warriors "Matrix Syndrome" Ed Lazellari Collected in New Warriors Omnibus Vol 3
158	Vengeance "Altered Spirits" Chris Cooper and Reggie Jones	Shang-Chi "The Gauntlet" Karl Bollers and Cary Nord	Clan Destine "Scare Tactics" Alan Davis Collected in Clandestine Classic and Marvel Firsts: The 1990s Omnibus	New Warriors "Matrix Syndrome" Ed Lazellari Collected in New Warriors Omnibus Vol 3
159	Vengeance "Altered Spirits" Chris Cooper and Reggie Jones	Hawkeye "Rocky Reunion" Nelson Yomtov and Gerard Decaire Collected in Marvel Premiere Classic - Avengers: Hawkeye - Earth's Mightiest Marksman and Hawkeye Epic Collection Vol 4: Shafted	Nick Fury "Duty and Country" Glenn Greenberg and Edmund Perryman	New Warriors "Smells Like Teen Spirit" Fabian Nicieza and Robert Walker Collected in New Warriors Omnibus Vol 2
160	Vengeance "Diabolique" Chris Cooper and Reggie Jones	Hawkeye "Rocky Reunion" Nelson Yomtov and Gerard Decaire Collected in Marvel Premiere Classic - Avengers: Hawkeye - Earth's Mightiest Marksman and Hawkeye Epic Collection Vol 4: Shafted	Mace "Origins" Carl Potts and Barry Crain	New Warriors "Smells Like Teen Spirit" Fabian Nicieza and Robert Walker Collected in New Warriors Omnibus Vol 2
161	Vengeance "Diabolique" Chris Cooper and Reggie Jones	Hawkeye "Rocky Reunion" Nelson Yomtov and Gerard Decaire Collected in Marvel Premiere Classic - Avengers: Hawkeye - Earth's Mightiest Marksman and Hawkeye Epic Collection Vol 4: Shafted	Mace "Origins" Carl Potts and Barry Crain	New Warriors "Smells Like Teen Spirit" Fabian Nicieza and Robert Walker Collected in New Warriors Omnibus Vol 2
162	Vengeance "Diabolique" Chris Cooper and Reggie Jones	Tigra "Slave of Passion" David DeVries and John Czop	Mace "Origins" Carl Potts and Barry Crain	New Warriors "Smells Like Teen Spirit" Fabian Nicieza and Robert Walker Collected in New Warriors Omnibus Vol 2
163	Vengeance "Diabolique" Chris Cooper and Reggie Jones	Tigra "Slave of Passion" David DeVries and John Czop	Mace "Origins" Carl Potts and Barry Crain	New Warriors "Smells Like Teen Spirit" Fabian Nicieza and Robert Walker Collected in New Warriors Omnibus Vol 2
164	Vengeance "Once and Future Spirits" Chris Cooper and Reggie Jones	Tigra "Slave of Passion" David DeVries and John Czop	Man-Thing "Behold the Man-Thing" Simon Jowett and Paul Johnson	Thing "Rabbit Stu" Mariano Nicieza and John Ross
165	Vengeance "Once and Future Spirits" Chris Cooper and Reggie Jones	Tigra "Slave of Passion" David DeVries and John Czop	Man-Thing "Behold the Man-Thing" Simon Jowett and Paul Johnson	Mr. Fantastic "Confrontation" Mariano Nicieza and Ed Muir
166	Vengeance "Once and Future Spirits" Chris Cooper and Reggie Jones	Spider-Woman (Force Works) "The Great American Mall Shoot-Out" Nelson Yomtov and John Czop	Man-Thing "Behold the Man-Thing" Simon Jowett and Paul Johnson	Turbo (New Warriors) "Cutting Class" Evan Skolnik and Guy Dorian Collected in New Warriors Omnibus Vol 3
167	Vengeance "Old-Time Religion" Chris Cooper and Reggie Jones	Spider-Woman (Force Works) "The Great American Mall Shoot-Out" Nelson Yomtov and John Czop	Man-Thing "Behold the Man-Thing" Simon Jowett and Paul Johnson	Turbo (New Warriors) "Cutting Class" Evan Skolnik and Guy Dorian Collected in New Warriors Omnibus Vol 3
168	Vengeance "Old-Time Religion" Chris Cooper and Reggie Jones	Spider-Woman (Force Works) "The Great American Mall Shoot-Out" Nelson Yomtov and John Czop	Blackbolt (Inhumans) "History Lesson" Reggie Jones and Jeff Moore	Valkyrie "Freedom" Mariano Nicieza and Pino Rinaldi
169	Vengeance "Old-Time Religion" Chris Cooper and Reggie Jones	Mandarin "In the Hands of the Mandarin" Len Kaminski, Scott Benson and Patrick Bolo Collected in Iron Man/War Machine: Hands of the Mandarin and Iron Man Epic Collection: In the Hands of Evil	Century (Force Works) "Century" Dan Abnett and Lawrence Brown Collected in Iron Man/War Machine: Hands of the Mandarin and Iron Man Epic Collection: In the Hands of Evil	It, the Living Colossus "Rock 'em Sock 'em Robots" Barry Dutter, Alan Cowsill, and Jon Fonteriz
170	Vengeance "Shrinking to Nothing" Chris Cooper and Reggie Jones	Mandarin "In the Hands of the Mandarin" Len Kaminski, Scott Benson and Patrick Bolo Collected in Iron Man/War Machine: Hands of the Mandarin and Iron Man Epic Collection: In the Hands of Evil	Force Works "Suzi" Dan Abnett and Randy Garcia Collected in Iron Man/War Machine: Hands of the Mandarin and Iron Man Epic Collection: In the Hands of Evil	Red Wolf "Red Wolf" Alan Cowsill and Jim Cheung Collected in Secret Wars: Warzones - Marvel 1872
171	Vengeance "Identity Crisis" Chris Cooper and Reggie Jones	Force Works "War Machine P.O.V." Dan Abnett and Rob Haynes Collected in Iron Man/War Machine: Hands of the Mandarin and Iron Man Epic Collection: In the Hands of Evil	Force Works "Recorder P.O.V." Dan Abnett and Brian Williamson Collected in Iron Man/War Machine: Hands of the Mandarin and Iron Man Epic Collection: In the Hands of Evil	Nick Fury "Codename: Wolfen" Alan Cowsill and Pasqual Ferry
172	Vengeance "I Found My Heart in San Francisco" Chris Cooper, Alan Cowsill and Reggie Jones	Force Works "U.S.Agent" Dan Abnett and Fred Haynes Collected in Iron Man/War Machine: Hands of the Mandarin and Iron Man Epic Collection: In the Hands of Evil	Force Works "Scarlet Witch" Dan Abnett and John Czop Collected in Iron Man/War Machine: Hands of the Mandarin and Iron Man Epic Collection: In the Hands of Evil	Lunatik "Pain and Penalties" Lovern Kindzierski and Keith Giffen
173	Vengeance "Diabolical Designs" Chris Cooper and Reggie Jones	Nick Fury "Test Run" Bambos Georgiou and Dave Steele	Stingray "Repercussions" Mariano Nicieza and Mark McKenna	Lunatik "The Devil to Pay" Lovern Kindzierski and Keith Giffen
174	Vengeance "Gone Wild" Chris Cooper and Fred Harper	Nick Fury "Breakthrough" Mariano Nicieza and Warren Martinbeck	Technet (Excalibur) "Cross-time Critters" Skip Dietz and Paco Diaz Luque Collected in Excalibur Omnibus Vol. 3 and Excalibur Epic Collection Vol 6: The Douglock Chronicles	Lunatik "Damages" Lovern Kindzierski and Keith Giffen
175	Vengeance "Final Gambit" Chris Cooper and Fred Harper	New Genix "New Genix" Steve Lightle	Steel Raven "Lessons" Steve Lightle	Lunatik "Punishment" Lovern Kindzierski and Keith Giffen

== Volume 2 ==
In 2007 the anthology series returned, also including work by creators previously unpublished in the comics field. The series' editors were Warren Simons, Nick Lowe, Andy Schmidt, and John Barber. The series hosted two 12-part stories (The Vanguard super-team and Weapon Omega) and a host of short one-part to five-part stories involving a variety of characters within the Marvel Universe. The series was cancelled with issue #12.

=== Stories in volume 2 ===
Issue #	A Story	B Story	C Story	D Story	E Story
1	Vanguard "Vanguard" Marc Guggenheim and Dave Wilkins	Hellcat "The Girl Who Could Be You" Kathryn Immonen and Stuart Immonen Collected in Patsy Walker: Hellcat	Weapon Omega "Weapon Omega" Rob Koslowski and Andrea DeVito Collected in Weapon Omega	Spider-Man "Unfriendly Neighborhood" Stuart Moore and Clayton Henry	Thing "To Love a Man, Not a Monster" Mark Nelson
2	Vanguard "Vanguard" Marc Guggenheim and Dave Wilkins	Hellcat "The Girl Who Could Be You" Kathryn Immonen and Stuart Immonen Collected in Patsy Walker: Hellcat	Weapon Omega "Weapon Omega" Rob Koslowski and Andrea DeVito Collected in Weapon Omega	Taskmaster "Best Offense" M. Zachary Sherman and Khoi Pham	No E Story
3	Vanguard "Vanguard" Marc Guggenheim and Dave Wilkins	Hellcat "The Girl Who Could Be You" Kathryn Immonen and Stuart Immonen Collected in Patsy Walker: Hellcat	Weapon Omega "Weapon Omega" Rob Koslowski and Andrea DeVito Collected in Weapon Omega	Magneto "Hateful" David VonAllmen and Mico Suayan	No E Story
4	Vanguard "Vanguard" Marc Guggenheim and Dave Wilkins	Hellcat "The Girl Who Could Be You" Kathryn Immonen and Stuart Immonen Collected in Patsy Walker: Hellcat	Weapon Omega "Weapon Omega" Rob Koslowski and Andrea DeVito Collected in Weapon Omega	Outlaw Kid "The Outlaw Kid" Joshua Hale Fialkov and Chris Moeller	No E Story
5	Vanguard "Vanguard" Marc Guggenheim and Dave Wilkins	Ka-Zar "Savage Land" Christos N. Gage and Joyce Chin	Weapon Omega "Weapon Omega" Rob Koslowski and Andrea DeVito Collected in Weapon Omega	Wrecking Crew "Breaking Away" Merrill Hagan and Stas Johnson	No E Story
6	Vanguard "Vanguard" Marc Guggenheim and Dave Wilkins	Ka-Zar "Savage Land" Christos N. Gage and Joyce Chin	Weapon Omega "Weapon Omega" Rob Koslowski and Andrea DeVito Collected in Weapon Omega	Captain America "4F" Robert Venditti and Jeremy Haun	No E Story
7	Vanguard "Vanguard" Marc Guggenheim and Dave Wilkins	Ka-Zar "Savage Land" Christos N. Gage and Joyce Chin	Weapon Omega "Weapon Omega" Rob Koslowski and Andrea DeVito Collected in Weapon Omega	Sub-Mariner "Paying Respects" Mandy McMurray and Roy Allan Martinez	No E Story
8	Vanguard "Vanguard" Marc Guggenheim and Dave Wilkins	Machine Man "Machine Man" Ivan Brandon and Nico Henrichon	Weapon Omega "Weapon Omega" Rob Koslowski and Andrea DeVito Collected in Weapon Omega	Cyclops and Wolverine (X-Men) "The Rabbit Hunt" Andy Schmidt and Marco Turini	No E Story
9	Vanguard "Vanguard" Marc Guggenheim and Dave Wilkins	Machine Man "Machine Man" Ivan Brandon and Nico Henrichon	Weapon Omega "Weapon Omega" Rob Koslowski and Andrea DeVito Collected in Weapon Omega	Hulk "Gammaragnarok" Mark Parsons, Tom Cohen, and Ed McGuinness	No E Story
10	Vanguard "Vanguard" Marc Guggenheim and Dave Wilkins	Machine Man "Machine Man" Ivan Brandon and Nico Henrichon	Weapon Omega "Weapon Omega" Rob Koslowski and Andrea DeVito Collected in Weapon Omega	Deadpool "Fun With Ninjas" Jesse Blaze Snider and Marco Checchetto Collected in Deadpool Classic Companion Vol 1	No E Story
11	Vanguard "Vanguard" Marc Guggenheim and Dave Wilkins	Machine Man "Machine Man" Ivan Brandon and Nico Henrichon	Weapon Omega "Weapon Omega" Rob Koslowski and Andrea DeVito Collected in Weapon Omega	Stingray "Depth Charge" B. Clay Moore and Lee Weeks	No E Story
12	Vanguard "Vanguard" Marc Guggenheim and Dave Wilkins	Machine Man "Machine Man" Ivan Brandon and Nico Henrichon	Weapon Omega "Weapon Omega" Rob Koslowski and Andrea DeVito Collected in Weapon Omega	Man-Thing "Dirty Work" Jai Nitz and Ben Stenbeck	No E Story

== Volume 3 ==
In 2019, the anthology series returned.

=== Stories in volume 3 ===
Issue #	A Story	B Story All Collected in Tales Through the Marvel Universe	C Story All Collected in Tales Through the Marvel Universe
1	Wolverine "The Vigil" Charles Soule and Paolo Siqueira Collected in Wolverine: The Daughter of Wolverine	Sub-Mariner "War's End" Greg Pak and Tomm Coker	Captain America "First Ride" Ann Nocenti and Greg Land
2	Wolverine "The Vigil" Charles Soule and Paolo Siqueira Collected in Wolverine: The Daughter of Wolverine	Mr. Fantastic "Liftoff" Mark Waid and Djibril Morissette-Phan	Gorilla-Man and Black Panther "This Man, This Gorilla" David Lapham and Maria Lapham
3	Wolverine "The Vigil" Charles Soule and Paolo Siqueira Collected in Wolverine: The Daughter of Wolverine	Captain America "Home of the Brave" Andrew Aydin and Daniel Acuña	Spider-Man and Brother Voodoo "Heart of the Spider" James Monroe Iglehart and Ray-Anthony Height
4	Wolverine "The Vigil" Charles Soule and Paolo Siqueira Collected in Wolverine: The Daughter of Wolverine	Spider-Man "May the 25th Be With You" Daniel Kibblesmith and Pere Perez	Moon Knight "The Book of Dreams" Benjamin Percy and Juan Ferreyra
5	Wolverine "The Vigil" Charles Soule and Paolo Siqueira Collected in Wolverine: The Daughter of Wolverine	Nightcrawler (Excalibur) "Demon's Choice" Chris Claremont and Luke Ross	Venom "Phenethylamin" Leah Williams and Guillermo Sanna
6	Wolverine "The Vigil" Charles Soule and Paolo Siqueira Collected in Wolverine: The Daughter of Wolverine	Deadpool "First Appearance: Red-Hot Raze" Tim Seeley and Reilly Brown	Ghost Rider "Fadeaway" Ed Brisson and Juan Frigeri Collected in Ghost Rider: King of Hell and Ghost Rider by Ed Brisson
7	Wolverine "The Vigil" Charles Soule and Paolo Siqueira Collected in Wolverine: The Daughter of Wolverine	Iron Man "Market Correction" Ryan North and Rod Reis	Winter Soldier "Sine Eo Alia Essent Visibilia Omnia" D.C. Pierson and Alessandro Vitti
8	Wolverine "The Vigil" Charles Soule and Paolo Siqueira Collected in Wolverine: The Daughter of Wolverine	Spider-Woman "The Spider Caught in the Web" Ethan Sacks and Marco Castiello	White Fox "Legendary" Emily Ryan Lerner and Michael Shelfer
9	Wolverine "The Vigil" Charles Soule and Paolo Siqueira Collected in Wolverine: The Daughter of Wolverine	.EXE/men (Wolverine) "Weapon_ _EXE" Zac Thompson, Lonnie Nadler and André Lima Araújo	No C Story

== Bibliography ==
- Marvel Comics Presents vol. 1 #1–175
- Marvel Comics Presents vol. 2 #1–12

=== Collected editions ===
- Wolverine: Save the Tiger!/Marvel Comics Presents Wolverine Vol. 1 (vol. 1) #1–10
- The Man-Thing by Steve Gerber Vol. 3 (vol. 1) #1-12
- Shang-Chi, Master of Kung-Fu Omnibus Vol. 4 (vol. 1) #1–8
- Colossus: God's Country (vol. 1) #10–17
- Black Panther: Panther's Quest (vol. 1) #13–37
- Speedball Classic (vol. 1) #14, 56
- Cyclops: Retribution (vol. 1) #17–24
- The Sensational She-Hulk by John Byrne (vol. 1) #18
- Incredible Hulk by Peter David Omnibus Vol. 1 (vol. 1) #26
- Excalibur Epic Collection: The Sword is Drawn (vol. 1) #31–38
- Marvel Comics Presents Wolverine Vol. 2 (vol. 1) #39–50
- Hercules: Full Circle (vol. 1) #39-41
- Incredible Hulk by Peter David Omnibus Vol. 1 (vol. 1) #45
- Silver Surfer Epic Collection: Thanos Quest (vol. 1) #50
- Marvel Comics Presents Wolverine Vol. 3 (vol. 1) #51–61
- Avengers: Scarlet Witch (vol. 1) #60-63, 143-144
- Marvel Comics Presents Wolverine Vol. 4 (vol. 1) #62–71
- Wolverine and Ghost Rider in Acts of Vengeance (vol. 1) #64–70
- Silver Surfer Epic Collection: The Infinity Gauntlet (vol. 1) #69, 93–97
- Wolverine: Weapon X (vol. 1) #72–84
- Excalibur Epic Collection: Girls' School From Heck (vol. 1) #75
- X-Men Origins: Firestar (vol. 1) #82-87
- Wolverine: Blood Hungry (vol. 1) #85–92
- Wolverine: Prehistory (vol. 1) #93–98
- Infinity War (vol. 1) #108-111
- Wolverine: Typhoid's Kiss (vol. 1) #109–116
- Daredevil: Typhoid's Kiss (vol. 1) #109–116, 123–130, 150–151
- Iron Fist: Book of Changes (vol. 1) #111, 113–118, 125–137, 140–141
- Wolverine vs. the Marvel Universe (vol. 1) #117–122
- Avengers: Hawkeye - Earth's Mightiest Marksman (vol. 1) #159-161
- War Machine/The Invincible Iron Man: Hands of the Mandarin (vol. 1) #169-172
- Patsy Walker: Hellcat (vol. 2) #1–4
- Marvel Comics Presents Weapon Omega (vol. 2) #1–12

== See also ==
- DC Comics Presents
- Dark Horse Presents
