= Forgotten Realms (comics) =

1989 comic book series

Publication information
- Publisher: DC Comics
- Schedule: Monthly
- Format: Ongoing series
- Publication date: September 1989 – September 1991
- No. of issues: 25 issues

Creative team
- Created by: Jeff Grubb, Rags Morales

Forgotten Realms is a fantasy comic book set in the Dungeons & Dragons Forgotten Realms campaign setting, that was written by Jeff Grubb and illustrated by Rags Morales and Dave Simons.

== Publication history ==
In 1989, DC Comics began publishing the Forgotten Realms comic series, written by Jeff Grubb. Each issue contained twenty-six pages, illustrated primarily by Rags Morales and Dave Simons. The 19 issues produced by Morales were his first professional works. Tom Raney illustrated issues #17 and #20. Elliot S. Maggin served as an editor for DC from 1989 to 1991 and oversaw the licensed TSR titles, including Forgotten Realms. Twenty-five issues were published in total, with the last being released in 1991. Kim Yale served as an editor for DC from 1991–1993 and oversaw their licensed titles. Grubb wrote all 25 issues of the regular series. James Lowder scripted the crossover story from the series in TSR Worlds Annual #1. A fifty-six page annual Forgotten Realms Comic Annual #1: Waterdhavian Nights, illustrated by various artists, was released in 1990, illustrated by Tom Raney.

== Plot ==
The Hand of Vaprak #1 - 4
Priam and Vartan accidentally come across a powerful artifact, the Hand of Vaprak. Ishi, Minder, Dwalimor, and Foxilon try to recover the hand before the original owner, who, in reality, is not Vaprak.

Dragonreach #5 - 8
A mysterious force is murdering dragons in the realms. The companions have to stop this dragonslayer before the dragons emigrate and cause untold damage to the realms. Foxilon's talents as a doula save the day when magic fails.

Elminster is involved in this story arc. He assists Dwalimor Omen in stopping an individual who was slaying dragons in the Realms.

Minder's Story #9
Chronicles Minder's story and how she got into the golem body.

Head Cheese #10
Chronicles Foxilon's addiction to "cheeese" and how he met Dwalimor Omen.

Triangles #11 - 13
Priam tries to track down a hunchback, Jasmine, with a familiar face on the streets of Saerloon. Jasmine does her best to evade and a ship of wizards arrives from Halruaa to arrest Omen. Lady Rae's, a bar that caters exclusively to female adventurers, is introduced.

Undead Love #14
Jasmine attracts the attention of an undead lich who claims her as his new bride. Jasmine challenges Ishi to a "duel of hearts", a contest to win the affections of Priam. Continued in the TSR Worlds Annual.

TSR Worlds Annual #1 (chapter 4)
The crew of the Realms Master arrive at the lich's frozen castle only to be attacked by a deceived Meridith, Tember, and Pax (from the pages of DC/TSR's Spelljammer comic). After both parties realize they are on the same side, Dwalimor tricks the lich into bringing down his castle upon himself and Ishi wins the duel of hearts when Priam chooses to save her over Jasmine. Jasmine leaves the Realms Master to join the crew of the space faring Spelljammer. Scripted by James Lowder, not regular series writer Jeff Grubb.

Waterdhavian Nights (Forgotten Realms Annual #1)
The Realms Master arrives in a festive Waterdeep to collect an artifact, the Eye of Selune. Followers of the evil Imgig Zu also seek the Eye in order to free Zu, who is trapped inside. The crew of the Realms Master teams up with Kyriani, Vajra Valmyjar, Onyx the Invincible, Timoth Eyesbright, and Conner (from the pages of DC/TSR's Advanced Dungeons & Dragons comic) to stop them. Onyx and Minder prove that dwarves can fall in love.

The Times of Troubles #15 - 18
Set during the Time of Troubles, Labelas uses Vartan as his host when he is forced into the mortal plane.

Picking up the Pieces #19 - 22
The weakened crew of the Realms Master are stranded in the desert and are taken captive.

Unreal Estate #23
Priam, Foxilon, & Minder need to stop a tavern gambler who is gambling away real estate in the cursed land of Myth Drannor.

Everybody Wants to Run the Realms #24
Vartan "steps outside the frame" to take the reader on a backstage tour behind the scenes of The Realms.

Wake of Realms Master #25
Labelas returns to offer the companions their heart's desire for what happened during the "Time of Troubles". He learns it's not as simple as granting wishes and some things have to be earned. After Labelas learns some humility and wisdom, Vartan is finally able to forgive him. The series concludes with Omen lighting the wake of the Realms Master.

== Characters ==
=== Realm Master Crew ===
Dwalimor Omen

Dwalimor Omen
A mage from the southern lands of Halruaa who is the captain of the Realms Master. Omen seeks out powerful artifacts to safely dispose of them. He meets Vartan and Priam in his search for the Hand of Vaprak. He is a powerful mage, but at times he experiences intense pains when he overly exerts his magical powers. At one point he mentions that he is slowly rotting away. He was once sought out by the Halruaan government for being a traitor.

Minder

Minder
A female dwarf whose mind has been transferred into a golem. Her body was altered several times, first when she was rapidly heated by a fire trap set by an ogre mage, then cooled by a cold spell. Her body was shattered by Labelas, and she was later remade into a more "anatomically correct" form. It was first believed that Minder was a human female, but in the Forgotten Realms annual she was revealed to be a dwarf. She's a constant guard to Omen, even going as far to be a nursemaid to him.

Ishi Barasume

Ishi Barasume
An oriental swordswoman who considers her honor to be of utmost importance and resents losing face. Her father died 10 years prior to start the series and she still sends messages to him as burnt offerings. For most of the series she seems to harbor a crush on Priam.

Jasmine

Jasmine
A winged female human who first appears in "Triangles" story arc. She later leaves her current companions to join the Spelljammer crew in the Spelljammer comics.

Vartan Hai Sylvar
An arrogant and sarcastic elven priest. Although he maintains an aloof facade, he does care deeply for his friends.

Priam Agrivar
A human paladin who has a past addiction to alcohol.

Foxilon Cardluck
A thief who has a previous addiction to a hallucinogenic cheese-like substance called "cheeese". In addition, he is an under-appreciated tailor with flamboyant flair and he can make do as a midwife in a pinch.

=== Other characters ===
Labelas Enoreth

Labelas is Vartan's deity. During the Time of Troubles he uses Vartan as a host body. He attempts to use the Realm Master and the crew to defeat the god Helm and restore his divinity.

== References to Forgotten Realms ==
Jeff Grubb uses various references to the world of Forgotten Realms, using known characters like Elminster. He uses as Labelas Enoreth one of elven pantheon of gods described in the Forgotten Realms world as Vartan's patron. He sets one of his story arcs, "An Avatar Story", during the Time of Troubles.
