= Frankenstein (2025 film) =

Film by Guillermo del Toro

- Release poster
- Directed by: Guillermo del Toro
- Screenplay by: Guillermo del Toro
- Based on: Frankenstein; or, The Modern Prometheus by Mary Shelley
- Produced by: Guillermo del Toro; J. Miles Dale; Scott Stuber
- Starring: Oscar Isaac; Jacob Elordi; Mia Goth; Christoph Waltz
- Cinematography: Dan Laustsen
- Edited by: Evan Schiff
- Music by: Alexandre Desplat
- Production companies: Double Dare You; Demilo Films; Bluegrass 7
- Distributed by: Netflix
- Release dates: August 30, 2025 (Venice); October 17, 2025 (United States); November 7, 2025 (Netflix)
- Running time: 150 minutes
- Country: United States
- Language: English
- Budget: $120 million
- Box office: $655,147

Frankenstein is a 2025 American Gothic science fiction horror film produced, written, and directed by Guillermo del Toro, based on Frankenstein; or, The Modern Prometheus, the 1818 novel by Mary Shelley. The film stars Oscar Isaac as Victor Frankenstein and Jacob Elordi as the Creature, with Mia Goth and Christoph Waltz in supporting roles. The story follows the life of Frankenstein, an egotistical scientist whose experiment in creating new life results in dangerous consequences.

Del Toro had long imagined a faithful Frankenstein film as a "dream project". This was initially in development for Universal Pictures, with del Toro casting frequent collaborator Doug Jones as the Creature, and Bernie Wrightson being considered for the monster's design. However, Universal suspended the project in relation to its planned Dark Universe franchise. Netflix revived the project in 2023, with Elordi instead portraying the Creature. Filming took place from March to September 2024. Although Wrightson died in 2017, his illustrated compilation Bernie Wrightson's Frankenstein was a key inspiration for the film's look.

Frankenstein premiered at the 82nd Venice International Film Festival on August 30, 2025. It had a limited theatrical release in the United States from October 17 and was globally released on November 7 on Netflix. The film received generally positive reviews from critics. Both the National Board of Review and the American Film Institute named it as one of the top ten films of 2025. It received five nominations at the 83rd Golden Globe Awards, including Best Motion Picture – Drama, and nine nominations at the 98th Academy Awards, including Best Picture, Best Adapted Screenplay and Best Supporting Actor (Elordi), and won for Best Costume Design, Best Makeup and Hairstyling, and Best Production Design.

== Plot ==
=== Prelude ===
In 1857, Horisont, a Royal Danish Navy ship sailing for the North Pole, becomes trapped in ice. Alerted to an explosion in the distance, Captain Anderson and his men discover a gravely injured Victor Frankenstein, using a right prosthetic leg. Upon bringing him aboard, the crew is attacked by a humanoid creature who demands Victor's surrender. Anderson uses a blunderbuss to sink the Creature into the water. Victor explains that he created the Creature and recounts the events leading to its creation.

=== Part I: Victor's Tale ===
Victor's mother dies giving birth to his younger brother, William, who becomes the favorite of their renowned, aristocratic father. Grieving his mother and resenting his abusive father, Victor becomes a brilliant, arrogant surgeon obsessed with "curing" death through science. He is expelled from the Royal College of Surgeons of Edinburgh for reanimating a corpse, which a disciplinary tribunal denounces as sacrilege.

Arms merchant Henrich Harlander, impressed by his presentation, offers Victor unlimited funding and an isolated tower to continue his experiments under an unnamed condition. Enlisting William's assistance in building his laboratory, Victor becomes smitten with Elizabeth, Harlander's niece and William's fiancée, who declines his advances.

When an impatient Harlander demands results within a week, Victor fashions parts from criminals and soldiers killed in the ongoing Crimean War into a body to reanimate. Harlander reveals he is dying of syphilis and unveils his condition – he wants his brain transplanted into the body of the Creature. When Victor refuses, Harlander attempts to sabotage the experiment, but falls to his death. Lightning strikes the Creature as planned, but it fails to reanimate.

The following morning, Victor finds the Creature alive. He marvels at its immense strength and ability to rapidly heal wounds, but can only teach it to speak one word: "Victor". Frustrated by the Creature's lack of intellectual growth, Victor begins to imitate his father's cruel discipline and becomes afraid of the Creature's physical strength. Visiting with William, Elizabeth questions Victor's treatment of the Creature and bonds with him, teaching him to speak her name. When William finds Harlander's body, Victor dishonestly claims the Creature killed him in a fit of rage. After sending them away, Victor sets his lab ablaze with the Creature inside. Hearing the Creature call his name, Victor remorsefully attempts to reenter the tower, but it explodes, severing his leg.

In the present, the Creature boards the ship, confronts the captain, and shares his own story.

=== Part II: The Creature's Tale ===
The Creature escapes the explosion and takes shelter in the mill gears of a family's farm. Over the next year, he secretly provides the family with large supplies of firewood and builds a pen for their sheep. They thank their unseen benefactor as the "Spirit of the Forest."

When the rest of the family leaves for the mountains to hunt wolves, the Creature befriends their blind patriarch, who teaches him to read and speak fluently. The Creature journeys to the ruins of the laboratory, where he discovers the truth about his creation and the address to Victor's estate. He returns to the farm to find the blind man being attacked by wolves, which the Creature fights off before comforting his dying friend. The family returns and, mistakenly believing the Creature killed the blind man, shoots him.

After reviving, the Creature realizes he cannot die and will spend eternity alone. He confronts Victor during William and Elizabeth's wedding, demanding the creation of a companion. Victor, fearing the possibility of the Creature reproducing, adamantly refuses. The Creature attacks him. Hearing the commotion, Elizabeth rushes in and embraces the creature. While attempting to shoot the Creature, Victor accidentally shoots Elizabeth instead. William is mortally wounded while attempting to rush the Creature; before dying, he calls Victor a "monster". The Creature carries Elizabeth to a cave and comforts her as she dies. Victor pursues the Creature to the Arctic, where the Creature attempts to destroy himself with a stick of dynamite but fails.

In the present, a remorseful Victor and the Creature reconcile, addressing each other as "father" and "son", before Victor succumbs to his injuries. The Creature frees the ship from the ice. Anderson decides to abandon his pursuit and sail back home. Alone, the Creature reaches out to embrace the sunlight as Victor once taught him.

== Cast ==
- Oscar Isaac as Baron Victor Frankenstein, a surgeon determined to create life from dead matter
  - Christian Convery as young Victor
- Jacob Elordi as the Creature, Victor's monstrous simulacrum creation
- Mia Goth as
  - Lady Elizabeth Harlander, William's fiancée, for whom Victor has feelings
  - Baroness Claire Frankenstein, Victor's late mother, who died giving birth to William
- Felix Kammerer as William Frankenstein, Victor's younger brother and Elizabeth's fiancé
- David Bradley as the Blind Man, a blind old man who befriends the Creature
- Lars Mikkelsen as Captain Anderson, the head of a Royal Danish Navy expedition to the North Pole
- Charles Dance as Baron Leopold Frankenstein, Victor's strict, oppressive father and a renowned physician
- Christoph Waltz as Henrich Harlander, Elizabeth's uncle and a wealthy arms manufacturer who funds Victor's experiments
- Kyle Gatehouse as the Young Hunter, the unnamed son of the Blind Man
- Lauren Collins as Alma, the Young Hunter's wife
- Sofia Galasso as Anna-Maria, the granddaughter of the blind man and the daughter of the Young Hunter
- Ralph Ineson as Professor Krempe, a professor who oversees the hearing of Victor
- Burn Gorman as an executioner from whom Victor obtains the remains of deceased criminals
- Nikolaj Lie Kaas as Chief Officer Larsen, who attempts to persuade Captain Anderson of the crew's fading strength and morale

== Production ==
=== Development ===
In 2007, Guillermo del Toro said that a project that he "would kill to make" would be a faithful "Miltonian tragedy" version of Mary Shelley's 1818 novel Frankenstein, citing Frank Darabont's "pretty much perfect" script for Kenneth Branagh's 1994 film Mary Shelley's Frankenstein. In January 2008, he revealed that he was then in the process of crafting drawings that he hoped to use as a basis for the world of the film, and that, additionally, he had begun taking script notes but stopped once the WGA strike occurred. The following month, del Toro said of his vision:

What I'm trying to do is take the myth and do something with it, but combining elements of Frankenstein and Bride of Frankenstein without making it just a classical myth of the monster. The best moments in my mind of Frankenstein, of the novel, are yet to be filmed [...] The only guy that has ever nailed for me the emptiness, not the tragic, not the Miltonian dimension of the monster, but the emptiness is Christopher Lee in the Hammer films, where he really looks like something obscenely alive. Boris Karloff has the tragedy element nailed down but there are so many versions, including that great screenplay by Frank Darabont that was ultimately not really filmed.

Later that year, in September, the film was set up through del Toro's three-year first-look picture deal at Universal Pictures, alongside a slate of films he was announced to direct including Dr. Jekyll and Mr. Hyde, Slaughterhouse-Five and Drood. Del Toro cited Bernie Wrightson's 1983 Frankenstein illustrations as inspiration, and said the film would not be a direct adaptation of Shelley's novel, but rather "an adventure story that involves the creature." Del Toro wanted Wrightson to design his version of the Creature.

In 2009, del Toro stated that production on Frankenstein was not likely to begin for at least four years. Despite this, he had already cast frequent collaborator Doug Jones in the role of the Creature and begun initiating makeup tests with the actor. Jones later commented that the project was shelved due to Universal's future plans for their Dark Universe franchise. At Comic-Con 2010, del Toro told Collider that the story was his "favorite novel in the world". In a 2011 profile for The New Yorker, he was working on a proof of concept video for Universal. "The [original] version I developed with Universal was a different monster," del Toro later said. "It was asymmetric and closer to the depiction in the illustrated book." In 2013, he expressed public interest in casting Benedict Cumberbatch for the role of the Creature. In 2014, del Toro said that he would like to do versions of both Frankenstein and Bride of Frankenstein, and that Universal chairperson Donna Langley had approached him several times about getting it going but that he was reluctant to do so because it is his "dream project".

In 2016, del Toro said of his efforts to make the film:

Frankenstein to me is the pinnacle of everything, and part of me wants to do a version of it, part of me has for more than 25 years chickened out of making it. I dream I can make the greatest Frankenstein ever, but then if you make it, you've made it. Whether it's great or not, it's done. You cannot dream about it anymore. That's the tragedy of a filmmaker. [...] You landed a 10 or you landed a 6.5 but you were at the Olympics already, and you were judged.

In 2020, in an interview promoting the film Antlers (2021), del Toro stated that if he had the funding, he would make an adaptation of Frankenstein that would span two to three films due to the book's complexity and changing points of view.

In 2023, the project was revived by Netflix, with whom del Toro had signed a multi-year deal to produce projects. Following the win of Guillermo del Toro's Pinocchio (2022) at the 95th Academy Awards for Best Animated Feature, Variety revealed that he was set to write and direct the feature with Andrew Garfield, Oscar Isaac and Mia Goth in early talks for potential roles. In September, del Toro revealed that filming was scheduled to commence in February 2024, and that Christoph Waltz had been added to the cast. In January, Jacob Elordi replaced Garfield for the role of the Creature, due to scheduling conflicts that had resulted from the SAG-AFTRA strikes. Elordi was recommended to del Toro by a hair stylist who worked with Elordi on Priscilla (2023); previously on the set of Priscilla, Elordi had joked about having been cast in Frankenstein. Del Toro had spent nine months designing the look of Garfield's Creature but they were scrapped when he departed, leaving only nine weeks for him to redesign the look for the taller Elordi. Felix Kammerer, Lars Mikkelsen, David Bradley, Christian Convery, and Charles Dance joined the cast in undisclosed roles. Dance previously portrayed the father of Frankenstein in the 2015 film Victor Frankenstein. In April 2024, del Toro announced Ralph Ineson had been cast in the film in a "pivotal" cameo appearance.

Del Toro explained about taking his own approach to this adaptation: "What I find beautiful is that when you create a universal myth, whether it's Frankenstein, Pinocchio, Dracula, or Sherlock Holmes, the myth itself rises so far above the original material that any interpretation is equally faithful if done with sincerity, power, and personality. If you think in terms of fidelity to the canon, you would be completely paralyzed."

=== Filming ===
Principal photography began on March 4, 2024, in Toronto, and concluded in September. Additional filming took place at the Royal Mile in Edinburgh, Hospitalfield House in Arbroath, Angus, and Burghley House in Stamford, Lincolnshire, in September 2024. Del Toro said that it would not be a horror film, but an incredibly emotional story.

Oscar Isaac, who plays the lead character of Frankenstein, says the film is "this very European story, but told through a very Latin American, Mexican, Catholic point-of-view. So, it was just high passion all the time".

=== Music ===
Alexandre Desplat composed the musical score, having previously worked with del Toro on The Shape of Water (2017) and Pinocchio (2022). In a May 2025 interview, Desplat said: "Guillermo's cinema is very lyrical, and my music is rather lyrical too. So I think the music of Frankenstein will be something very lyrical and emotional. I'm not trying to write horrific music."

=== Influences ===
Del Toro said of his inspiration for making the movie: "It was a religion for me. Since I was a kid — I was raised very Catholic — I never quite understood the saints. And then when I saw Boris Karloff on the screen, I understood what a saint or a messiah looked like. So I've been following the creature since I was a kid, and I always waited for the movie to be done in the right conditions, both creatively in terms of achieving the scope that it needed for me to make it different, to make it at a scale that you could reconstruct the whole world." Del Toro acknowledged James Whale's 1931 adaptation as a formative influence and his version draws also from its 1935 sequel Bride of Frankenstein. Del Toro also cited Rebecca (1940) by Alfred Hitchcock, Wuthering Heights (1939) by William Wyler, Dragonwyck (1946) by Joseph L. Mankiewicz, and Uncle Silas (1947) by Charles Frank among his cinematic inspirations and influences. During a Netflix event in Los Angeles, the first footage from the film was scored to Polish composer Wojciech Kilar's score for Francis Ford Coppola's 1992 film Bram Stoker's Dracula.

== Release ==
Frankenstein landed its world premiere in the main competition of the 82nd Venice International Film Festival on August 30, 2025.

For its North American premiere, Frankenstein made it to the Special Presentations program of the Toronto International Film Festival, where it was screened on September 8, 2025. It was also presented in the Gala Presentation at the 30th Busan International Film Festival on September 18, 2025, and as a Headline Gala of the 69th BFI London Film Festival on October 13, 2025. For its Mexican premiere, it screened at the Morelia International Film Festival.

The film was released in select theaters on October 17, 2025, including select screenings on 35mm and IMAX, followed by a global streaming release on Netflix on November 7. Distribution for Mexico's release in select theaters was handled by Pimienta Films.

=== Home media ===
On February 23, 2026, Variety reported that the film would receive a physical home media release as part of the Criterion Collection. The 4K Ultra HD Blu-ray, Blu-ray, and DVD was released on October 27, 2026. The release contains a 158-minute director's cut of the film, titled Frankenstein: The Reborn Cut, in addition to the theatrical cut.

== Reception ==
=== Critical response ===
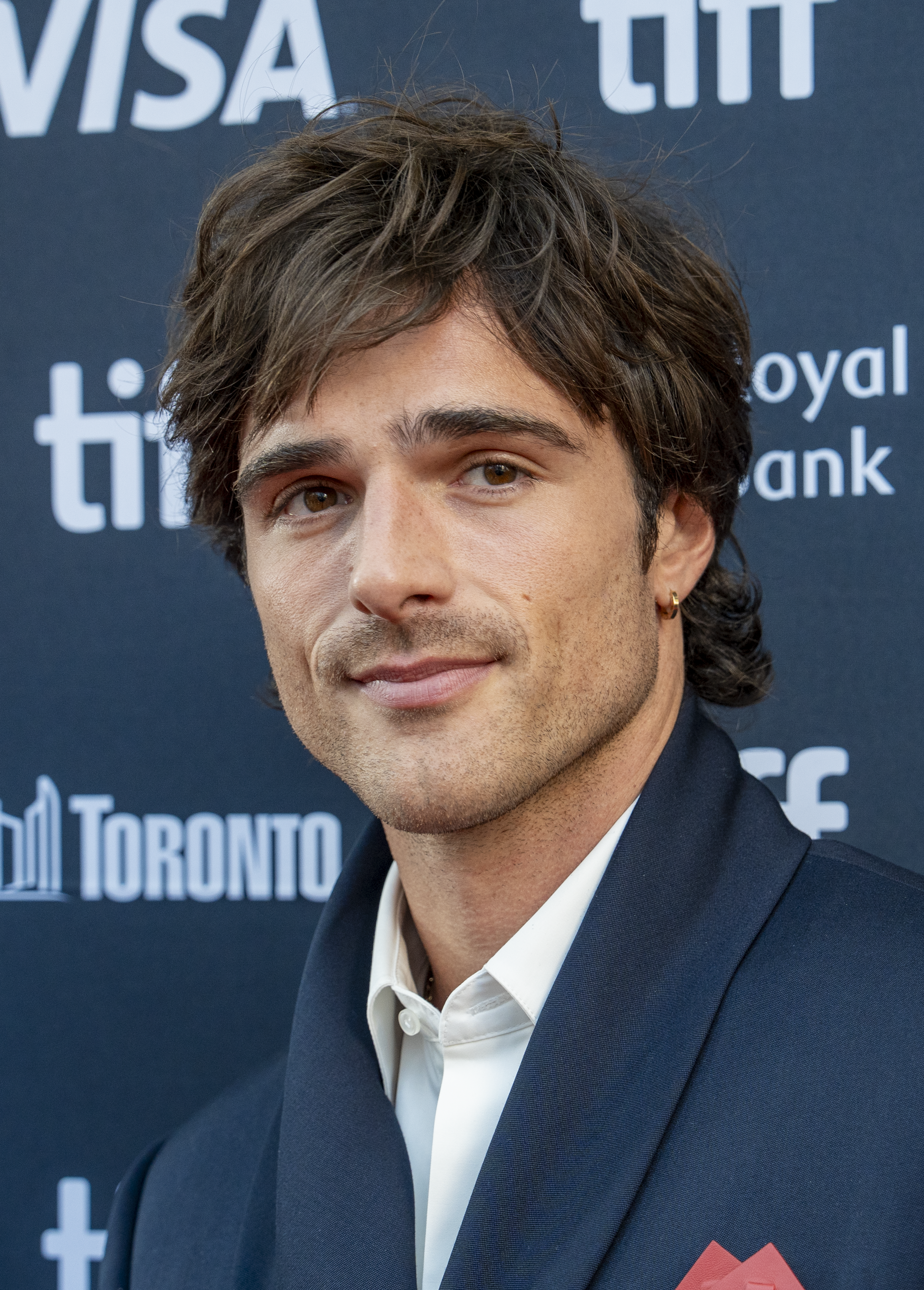
Jacob Elordi's performance as the Creature garnered widespread acclaim, earning him a nomination for the Academy Award for Best Supporting Actor.

On the review aggregator website Rotten Tomatoes, 85% of 384 critics' reviews are positive, with an average rating of 7.6/10. The website's consensus reads: "Finding the humanity in one of cinema's most iconic monsters, Guillermo Del Toro's Frankenstein is a lavish epic that gets its most invigorating volts from Jacob Elordi's standout performance." Metacritic, which uses a weighted average, assigned the film a score of 78 out of 100, based on 58 critics, indicating "generally favorable" reviews.

The film has been described as Gothic romanticism, in the vein of del Toro's own Crimson Peak (2015) or such films as Neil Jordan's Interview with the Vampire (1994) and Francis Ford Coppola's Bram Stoker's Dracula (1992). Alissa Wilkinson of The New York Times, selecting the film as a Critic's Pick, argues that del Toro's version wholeheartedly embraces the novel's profound debt to Paradise Lost while imprinting it with his signature style, transforming Shelley's literary skeleton into a distinctly del Toro tale of monstrous fathers and abandoned sons that remains faithful to the core pathos of the original text. This balance between fidelity and personal vision is echoed by The Hollywood Reporter's David Rooney, who describes the film as a visually sumptuous retelling that transcends horror for grand Romantic tragedy, suggesting it hews closely to the novel's tragic spirit while achieving a new cinematic scale. Empire's Jamie Graham awards the film four stars out of five, calling it "an unusually faithful rendition of Mary Shelley's novel" that also functions as a boldly personal Gothic romance, stitching together Shelley's themes with del Toro's signature fairy-tale and body-horror sensibilities into a sumptuous whole. In a full-throated rave, Glenn Kenny of RogerEbert.com offers a perfect score, vigorously defending the adaptation's integrity, crediting del Toro for forging something nearly new from the familiar source material by keeping "philosophically faithful to Mary Shelley's novel" even as he smartly transposes its core to a more fantastical Victorian setting, thereby expanding the humanity found in the classic story.

The Guardian's Peter Bradshaw granted the film three stars out of five, admiring its narrative shift to the Creature's perspective, while contending that its "luxurious, cod-period reverence" for a Victorian aesthetic ultimately sanitizes the tale's raw, philosophical horror, steering clear of the transgressive energy he finds in other interpretations. Ava Elizabeth Jenkins at The Daily Tar Heel argued that specific character alterations from Shelley's blueprint, such as aging up Victor Frankenstein and reconfiguring Elizabeth's role, ultimately "undermined the source material's emotional weight," rendering key moments from the novel feeling unearned in what she still calls a "beautifully horrific interpretation." Similarly, Peter Debruge of Variety noted that while del Toro's vision "hews closer to Mary Shelley's intentions" than most prior film adaptations, particularly in its empathetic exploration of creation and purpose, it ultimately buckles under its own weight, its structural choices and epic runtime diluting the novel's concentrated philosophical power.
