= Sudworth =

Sudworth is a surname. Notable people with the surname include:

- Anne Sudworth, English artist
- George Bishop Sudworth (1864–1927), American botanist
- John Sudworth, a British journalist
