= Heroes for Hope =

1985 Marvel comic book

Heroes for Hope: Starring the X-Men
- Front cover for Heroes for Hope. Art by Art Adams.

Publication information
- Publisher: Marvel Comics
- Format: One-shot
- Genre: Superhero
- Publication date: 1985
- No. of issues: 1
- Main character: X-Men

Creative team
- Created by: Jim Starlin; Bernie Wrightson
- Written by: List: Mike Baron Edward Bryant Chris Claremont Jo Duffy Harlan Ellison Steve Englehart Archie Goodwin Mike Grell Bruce Jones Stephen King Stan Lee Bill Mantlo George R. R. Martin Alan Moore Ann Nocenti Dennis O'Neil Jim Shooter Louise Simonson Jim Starlin Bernie Wrightson
- Artist: List: John Bolton Richard Corben Gray Morrow
- Penciller: List: Brent Anderson Bret Blevins Brian Bolland John Buscema John Byrne Howard Chaykin Jackson Guice Paul Gulacy Michael Kaluta Frank Miller John Romita Jr. Steve Rude Herb Trimpe Charles Vess Alan Weiss Bernie Wrightson
- Inker: List: Terry Austin Sal Buscema Al Gordon Dan Green Klaus Janson Jeff Jones Bob Layton Steve Leialoha Al Milgrom Jon J Muth Tom Palmer Carl Potts Josef Rubinstein P. Craig Russell Bill Sienkiewicz Walter Simonson Joe Sinnott Al Williamson
- Letterer: List: Diana Albers Ken Bruzenak L. Lois Buhalis Janice Chiang John Costanza Phil Hugh Felix Michael Higgins John Morelli Jim Novak Tom Orzechowski Rick Parker Joe Rosen John Workman Ron Zalme
- Colorist: List: John Bolton Daina Graziunas Ann Nocenti Glynis Oliver George Roussos Christie Scheele Petra Scotese Marie Severin Bob Sharen Michelle Wrightson Leslie Zahler
- Editor(s): Chris Claremont; Ann Nocenti

Heroes for Hope: Starring the X-Men is a 1985 Marvel comic book designed to raise awareness about hunger in Africa. Proceeds from the comic went to the American Friends Service Committee, to assist in their work on behalf of African famine relief and recovery. Published in the form of a "comic jam" or exquisite corpse, the book featured an all-star lineup of comics creators as well as authors from outside the comic book industry, such as Stephen King, George R. R. Martin, and Edward Bryant. Stan Lee, co-creator of the X-Men, wrote the new team of X-Men for the first time for Heroes for Hope. It also saw a rare Alan Moore Marvel Comics credit outside his early Marvel UK work.

Heroes for Hope featured artist/writer and penciler/inker pairings such as Stan Lee and John Buscema; Stephen King and Bernie Wrightson; Moore and Richard Corben; Harlan Ellison, Frank Miller, and Bill Sienkiewicz; Mike Baron and Steve Rude, Howard Chaykin inked by Walt Simonson; and John Byrne and Terry Austin reuniting on the X-Men.

Speakeasy magazine reported in April 1986 that Heroes for Hope raised $150,000 for the American Friends Service Committee.

== Publication history ==
Heroes for Hope came about in response to the devastating 1983–85 famine in Ethiopia. The concept was inspired by the benefit comics Marvel Comics had done to help employees with health problems and by contemporaneous musical fund-raisers like Band Aid's "Do They Know It's Christmas?" and USA for Africa's "We Are the World". Then-Marvel Comics editor-in-chief Jim Shooter described the genesis of the project this way:

One night, a few months ago, artist Jim Starlin called me at home to propose an idea that his friend and fellow artist Berni Wrightson had suggested to him — that Marvel Comics publish a special issue of The X-Men, a benefit book for famine relief in Africa. Jim and Berni wanted to do the book as a "jam", with as many artists and writers contributing, which would enable us to bring a small army of outstanding talents together on the project, making it a real event. I thought it was a great idea. The next morning I pitched it to Publisher Mike Hobson and President Jim Galton. . . . Jim and Berni recruited the artists. Chris Claremont . . . quickly volunteered to recruit writers, and to help . . . coordinate the entire project.

Starlin and Wrightson spent two days telephoning to recruit the artists, prioritizing top names in the comics field and people who had never drawn the X-Men before. Though Claremont recruited most of the writers who worked on Heroes for Hope, Stephen King was recruited by Wrightson. In addition to the contributors donating their work for the project, so did logo designer Janet Jackson and Marvel's production staff, while Curtis Circulation Company and all the direct market distributors and comics specialty shops donated their profits.

Ann Nocenti (the editor of both the regular X-Men series and Heroes for Hope), Claremont, Wrightson, and Starlin brainstormed story ideas together, and then Claremont spent several weeks constructing a plot from these ideas. Shooter then made some suggestions to give the story what he called "greater focus".

The George R. R. Martin/Herb Trimpe segment of the comic was planned to pair Trimpe with one of his favorite inkers, John Severin, but the segment was ultimately inked by Sal Buscema instead.

Though Heroes for Hope was produced to address the East African famine, Shooter pointed out that the story is only peripherally related to the famine: "The theme of the story is more about what one person, or a few people, can do to help the world. I think it will certainly inspire people to realize that one person or a few people can make a difference. I think if a person reads this book, he might be motivated to do something else for the benefit of East African relief programs or some other charitable work."

== Proceeds controversy ==
Marvel originally planned for the proceeds from the comic to go to Oxfam for its work in Africa. After previewing the book, the organization refused to accept the donation. The Oxfam representative found the comic "racist, sexist, and reprehensible," particularly taking issue with the presentation of women in the comic, especially X-Men heroine Storm, who is of African heritage. The representative apparently also believed the comic's logo had been stolen from the singer Janet Jackson (the Jackson family were major supporters of Oxfam) and refused to believe Marvel when they explained that their Janet Jackson was a different person.

The proceeds were instead given to the American Friends Service Committee, with the first check being in excess of $500,000.

== Plot ==
Rachel Summers pokes her head out of the X-Mansion to grab the mail, only to see that the mansion has been transported to the middle of a barren desert. After retrieving the comatose mail carrier, Wolverine senses that all is not right, and claws him in the face. The mail carrier and desert both vanish. The X-Men go back to business as usual, but experience a series of psychic assaults as they are each subjected to their greatest fears.

First, Colossus is mocked by steely apparitions of his teammates. This is more than he can bear, and he curls up in a fetal position. Kitty Pryde goes to grab something from the refrigerator as a skeletal being in a cloak turns her into an emaciated hag. Nightcrawler finds Kitty, which leads to his own experience, focusing on Christian imagery and moral dilemmas. Nightcrawler is offered the chance to sacrifice himself so that one other person might breathe the air and eat the food he would. He declines, and thinks himself a coward. Magneto is offered a glimpse of a world where his dream of mutant supremacy has been realized, and is attacked by the risen corpses of the slain humans. Rachel is swept back to her past, where she is confronted by a horde of Hounds, reminding her of her part in that dystopian future. Wolverine confronts the tension between his human and animal sides. Storm is confronted by a carnival ringmaster, who traps her in a house of mirrors. She is shown various images of her possible self. Storm gets drawn into the crazy carnival games, and realizes that it is wrong to waste food. Having fended off the psychic attacker by feeding cream pies to starving people, Storm returns to her teammates to discuss what has transpired.

Courtesy of Rachel's powers, the X-Men track the psychic presence that has been harassing them to Africa. They fly the Blackbird to the source, where they are met with horrible scenes of deprivation. A fleet of C-130 Hercules transport aircraft arrives, full of supplies, which the X-Men help distribute.

That night, Rogue becomes so frustrated that she has not had her turn of psychic punishment yet that she decides to hunt down the entity herself. She sneaks around the campsite stealing her teammates' powers. Using the psychic powers of Rachel, Rogue traces the presence of the X-Men's harasser to a desert hideaway. Upon entering the crypt, Rogue is attacked by the avatar of the psychic being. Storm appears to give aid. The "entity" is revealed to be a primeval god-force that feeds on human despair. One by one, the X-Men awake from their comas and join in the battle.

The X-Men defeat the entity and return to their campsite, where they resume the enormous task of feeding the starving refugees. They realize their battle with the entity was a metaphor for the fight against famine, and indeed any human struggle. Kitty expresses fear that the entity survived the battle and is ready to strike again, but Wolverine comforts her with words of hope.

== Contributors ==
Heroes for Hope featured a story by Chris Claremont, Ann Nocenti, Bernie Wrightson, Jim Starlin, and Jim Shooter. The editors were Nocenti and Claremont; the assistant editors were Pat Blevins and Terry Kavanagh. The front cover was made by Arthur Adams and the back cover by Starlin. The logo design is by Janet Jackson.

Page	Writer	Penciler	Inker	Letterer	Colorist
1-2	Stan Lee	John Romita Jr.	Al Gordon	Tom Orzechowski	Daina Graziunas
3-4	Stan Lee	John Buscema	Klaus Janson	Tom Orzechowski	Marie Severin
5	Ed Bryant	Brent Anderson	Joe Sinnott	Phil Felix	Bob Sharen
6-8	Louise Simonson	John Byrne	Terry Austin	Mike Higgins	Petra Scotese
9	Ed Bryant	Brent Anderson	Dan Green	Phil Felix	Bob Sharen
10-12	Stephen King	Bernie Wrightson	Jeff Jones	Tom Orzechowski	Christie Scheele
13-14	Bill Mantlo	Charlie Vess	Jon J Muth	Janice Chiang	Christie Scheele
15	Ed Bryant	Brent Anderson	Tom Palmer	Phil Felix	Bob Sharen
16-18	Alan Moore	Richard Corben	Richard Corben	Jim Novak	Michele Wrightson
19-21	Ann Nocenti	Mike Kaluta	Al Milgrom	Lois Buhalis	Glynis Oliver
22-24	Harlan Ellison	Frank Miller	Bill Sienkiewicz	John Workman	Christie Scheele
25-26	Chris Claremont	Brian Bolland	Craig Russell	Lois Buhalis	Glynis Oliver
27-28	Jo Duffy	John Bolton	John Bolton	Ron Zalme	John Bolton
29-30	Mike Baron	Steve Rude	Carl Potts	Diana Albers	Marie Severin
31-32	Dennis O'Neil	Bret Blevins	Al Williamson	Janice Chiang	Daina Graziunas
33-35	George Martin	Herb Trimpe	Sal Buscema	John Costanza	Glynis Oliver
36-37	Bruce Jones	Gray Morrow	Gray Morrow	Joe Rosen	Ann Nocenti
38-39	Steve Englehart	Paul Gulacy	Bob Layton	Ron Zalme	George Roussos
40-41	Jim Shooter	Alan Weiss	Joe Rubinstein	John Morelli	Christie Scheele
42-44	Mike Grell	Jackson Guice	Steve Leialoha	Rick Parker	George Roussos
45-48	Archie Goodwin	Howard Chaykin	Walt Simonson	Ken Bruzenak	Leslie Zahler

== Awards ==
Heroes for Hope producers Jim Starlin and Bernie Wrightson were co-recipients of the 1986 Bob Clampett Humanitarian Award for their work on the book.

== See also ==
- Heroes Against Hunger
- 9-11 (comics)
