= Jeffrey Catherine Jones =

American painter

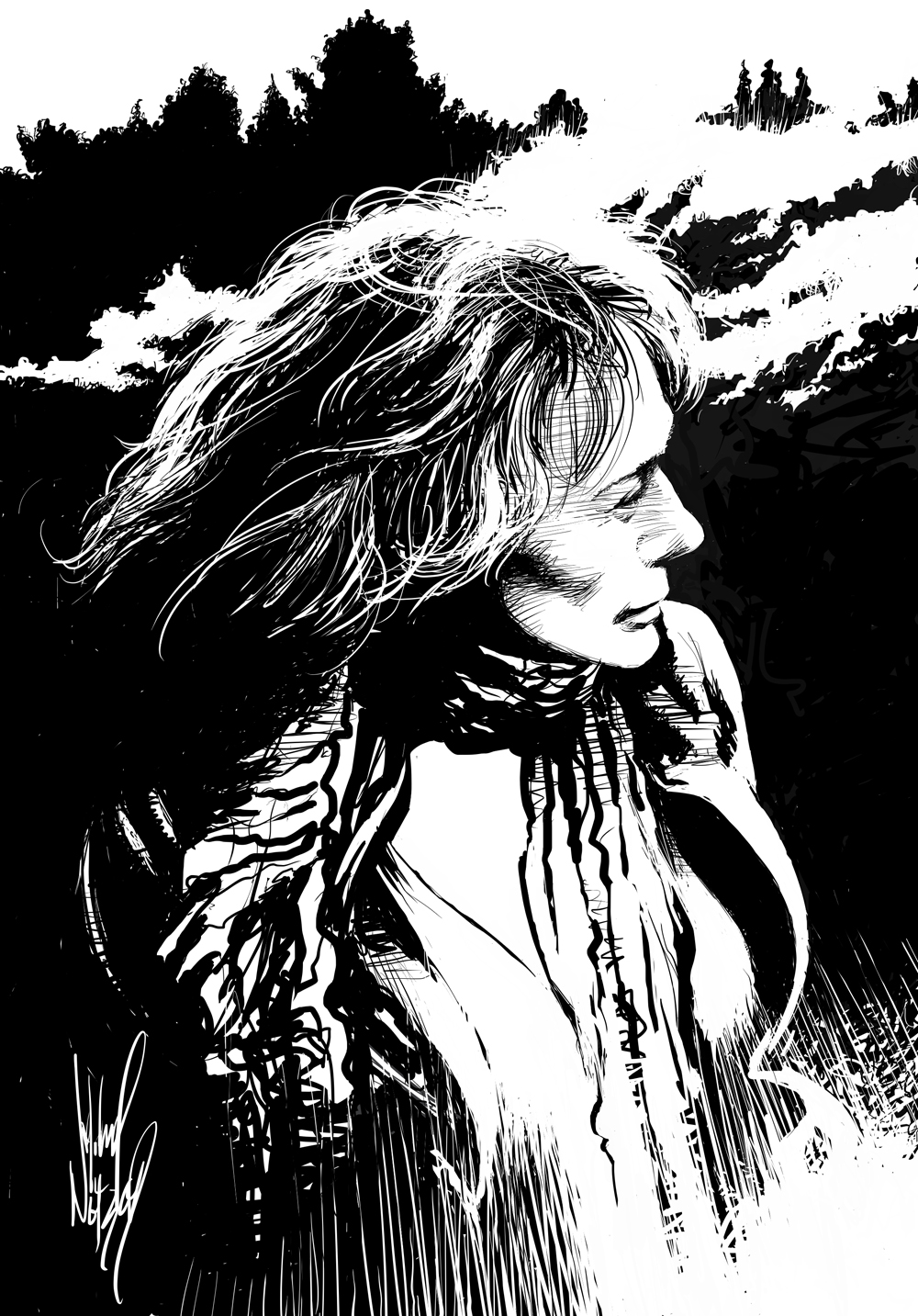
- Jeffrey Catherine Jones by Michael Netzer
- Born: Jeffrey Durwood Jones; January 10, 1944 Atlanta, Georgia, US
- Died: May 19, 2011 (aged 67)
- Area: Artist
- Awards: World Fantasy Award—Artist 1986

Jeffrey Catherine Jones (January 10, 1944 – May 19, 2011) was an American artist whose work is best known from the late 1960s through the 2000s. Jones created the cover art for more than 150 books through 1976, as well as venturing into fine art during and after this time. Fantasy artist Frank Frazetta supposedly described Jones as "the greatest living painter" and she included the quote on her website, but the source of the quote is unknown and Frazetta denied ever having said it when asked. Although Jones first achieved fame as simply Jeff Jones and later as Jeffrey Jones, she transitioned to female and added Catherine as a middle name in 1998.

== Early life ==
Jeffrey Durwood Jones was born January 10, 1944, and raised in Atlanta, Georgia. As a child, her father was overseas in the military. She graduated from Georgia State College in 1967 with a degree in geology and was keenly interested in art and admired the work of Johannes Vermeer, Giovanni Battista Tiepolo, and Rembrandt.

== Career ==
Jones moved to New York City to pursue an art career and quickly found work drawing comics pages for King Comics, Gold Key Comics, Creepy, Eerie, and Vampirella, as well as Wally Wood's Witzend. She painted covers for books, including the Ace paperback editions of Fritz Leiber's Fafhrd and the Gray Mouser series and Andre Norton's Postmarked the Stars, The Zero Stone, Uncharted Stars and over 150 others. For a period during the early 1970s, Jones also provided illustrations to Ted White's Fantastic. She drew many covers and short stories for a variety of comics publishers including DC Comics, Skywald Publications, and Warren but generally avoided the superhero genre.

In the 1972–1975 issues of National Lampoon, Jones produced a full page strip entitled Idyl.

=== The Studio ===
From 1975 to 1979 Jones shared a workspace in Manhattan's Chelsea district with Bernie Wrightson, Barry Windsor-Smith, and Michael Kaluta, collectively named The Studio. Dragon's Dream produced a volume of their work in 1979. Industry journalist Tom Spurgeon commented on the broader significance and influence of The Studio in his obituary of Jones at The Comics Reporter:

The legacy of that much talent doing what was collectively very good work at a point of almost monolithic and degrading corporate influence over the kind of art they wanted to do has provided The Studio with a legacy that can be embraced even by those that didn't particularly care for the artists' output. The idea of a dedicated workplace that would allow for coercive influence one artist to another has been carried over into very nearly [every] cartoonists' collective space initiative since.

By the early 1980s she had a recurring strip in Heavy Metal titled I'm Age. Cartoonists Walter Simonson and J. D. King said at the time that Jones had a growing interest in expressionism and did not pursue comic work as closely thereafter.

== Personal life ==
In 1964, while attending Georgia State College, Jones met fellow student Mary Louise Alexander (later notable as writer Louise Simonson). The two began dating and married in 1966. Their daughter Julianna was born the following year. After graduation, the couple moved to New York City but divorced in the early 1970s.

=== Gender transition ===
As an adult, Jones recalled wanting to be a girl from her earliest memories. She confronted these issues in 1998 and began hormone replacement therapy. Comics writer and journalist Steven Ringgenberg elaborated on the transition in an obituary/tribute to Jones at The Comics Journal:

It's now known from the artist's personal writings that she had felt conflicted about her gender since childhood, always feeling a greater affinity for the fair sex than for her own maleness. Having grown up as a product of the patriarchal 1950s, with a domineering war-hero father, Jones did not know how to cope with her yearning to be female, and felt ashamed. For years she tried to drown these feelings in alcohol, but, after much soul-searching, Jones realized that although she'd been born male, inside she was a woman. She began hormone replacement therapy in 1998, and set out upon a new phase of life as a woman, changing her name to Jeffrey Catherine Jones. Yet even this transition did not bring peace to this gentle, troubled artist, for in 2001, she suffered a nervous breakdown, which led to the loss of her home and studio. However, she eventually recovered, and by 2004 began painting and drawing again.

=== Death ===
Jones's personal Facebook page reported following her death: "Legendary fantasy artist Jeffrey Catherine Jones passed away today, Thursday, May 19, 2011, at 4:00 am surrounded by family. Jeffrey suffered from severe emphysema and bronchitis as well as hardening of the arteries around the heart ...".

== Awards ==
In 1967, Jones was nominated for the Hugo Award for Best Fan Artist; she was also nominated for the Hugo Award for Best Professional Artist in 1970, 1971, and 1972. In 1975 she was nominated for the World Fantasy Award—Artist, and won it in 1986. In 2006 she was presented with Spectrum’s Grand Master Award; per her request the name on the award’s plaque reads “Jeffrey Jones.” She explained, “That’s how people know me. That’s how I want to be remembered.” Additionally, Jones was nominated for the Chesley Award in 1999.

== Films ==
In 2012 a film retrospective on DVD by Maria P. Cabardo was released by Indiegogo featuring interviews with friends, fellow artists, and the artist herself titled Better Things: The Life and Choices of Jeffrey Catherine Jones.

== Bibliography ==
=== Books ===
- Yesterday's Lily 79 pages, Dragon's Dream, December 1980, ISBN 978-0825695520
- Age of Innocence: The Romantic Art of Jeffrey Jones 39 pages, Underwood Books, August 1994, ISBN 978-0887331855
- The Art of Jeffrey Jones 160 pages, Underwood Books, October 2002, ISBN 978-1887424578
- Jeffrey Jones Sketchbook 107 pages, Vanguard Productions, April 2007, ISBN 978-1887591102
- Absolute Death includes "A Winter's Tale" a six-page short story written by Neil Gaiman and drawn by Jones, 360 pages, DC Comics, October 2009, ISBN 978-1401224639
- Jeffrey Jones: A Life in Art 256 pages, IDW Publishing, January 2011, ISBN 978-1600107375
- Jeffrey Jones: The Definitive Reference 178 pages, Vanguard Productions, May 2013, ISBN 978-1934331545

=== Comics ===
==== Charlton Comics ====
- Charlton Bullseye #1 (1975)
- Flash Gordon #13 (1969)

==== DC Comics ====
- The Dark Mansion of Forbidden Love #3 (cover) (1972)
- Heroes Against Hunger #1 (1986)
- Showcase #83–84 (Nightmaster) (1969)
- Vertigo: Winter's Edge #2 (1999)
- The Witching Hour #14 (1971)
- Wonder Woman #199–200 (covers) (1972)

==== FantaCo Enterprises ====
- Gates of Eden #1 (1982)

==== Fantagraphics Books ====
- Jones Touch #1 (1993)
- Vaughn Bodē's Erotica #2 (introduction) (1996)
- The Complete Web of Horror (2024)

==== Gold Key Comics ====
- Boris Karloff Tales of Mystery #21 (1968)

==== HM Communications, Inc. ====
- Heavy Metal #v4 #2, 11; #v5 #3–4, 6–12; #v6 #2–12; #v7 #1–12 #v8 #1–4; #v11 #2 (1981–1987)

==== Last Gasp ====
- Spasm #1 (1973)

==== Marvel Comics ====
- Conan Saga #31 (1989)
- Epic Illustrated #10, 19, 25, 30 (1982–1985)
- Heroes for Hope Starring The X-Men #1 (1985)
- Savage Sword of Conan #5 (1975)

==== Major Magazines ====
- Web of Horror #1-3 (1969-1970)

==== NL Communications, Inc ====
- National Lampoon #v1 #28, 35, 38–39, 46–52, 54, 56–60 (1972–1975)

==== Pacific Comics ====
- Alien Worlds #4 (1983)
- Berni Wrightson: Master of the Macabre #4 (1984)
- Pathways to Fantasy #1 (1984)
- Ravens and Rainbows #1 (1983)

==== Renaissance Press ====
- The Forbidden Book #1 (2001)

==== Skywald Publications ====
- Nightmare #6–7 (covers), 21 (1971–1974)
- Psycho #6, 9, 12 (1971–1973)

==== Spiderbaby Grafix ====
- Taboo #5 (1991)

==== Topps Comics ====
- Jurassic Park tpb (1993)

==== TwoMorrows Publishing ====
- Streetwise #1 (2000)

==== Warren Publishing ====
- Comix International #3 (1975)
- Creepy #16, 29, 91, 103, 120 (1967–1980)
- Eerie #11–12, 15, 27 (1967–1970)
- Vampirella #4–5, 9, 12, 27, 32–34, 50, 83 (1970–1979)
