= The Studio (commune) =

Artists' studio in New York City

- Company type: Comics studio
- Founded: 1975; 51 years ago
- Founders: Barry Windsor-Smith; Jeff Jones; Michael Kaluta; Bernie Wrightson
- Defunct: 1979; 47 years ago
- Headquarters: Chelsea, New York City, U.S.

The Studio was the name of a small artists' loft commune formed in 1975 by four comic book artists/commercial illustrators/painters in Manhattan's Chelsea district. These artists were Barry Windsor-Smith, Jeff Jones, Michael Kaluta, and Bernie Wrightson — known colloquially as the "Fab Four". The purpose of The Studio was to provide the group with a space where they could pursue creative products outside the constraints of comic book commercialism.

The studio space was a converted machine shop with high ceilings.

Industry journalist Tom Spurgeon commented on the broader significance and influence of The Studio in his 2011 obituary of Jones at The Comics Reporter:

The legacy of that much talent doing what was collectively very good work at a point of almost monolithic and degrading corporate influence over the kind of art they wanted to do has provided The Studio with a legacy that can be embraced even by those that didn't particularly care for the artists' output. The idea of a dedicated workplace that would allow for coercive influence one artist to another has been carried over into very nearly ever cartoonists' collective space initiative since.

By 1979, the "Fab Four" had produced enough material to issue an art book under the name The Studio, which was published by Dragon's Dream. That same year the members of The Studio moved on to independent projects and separate work spaces.

== See also ==
- Upstart Associates
- Fab Four
