= Barry Windsor-Smith =

British graphic novelist (born 1949)

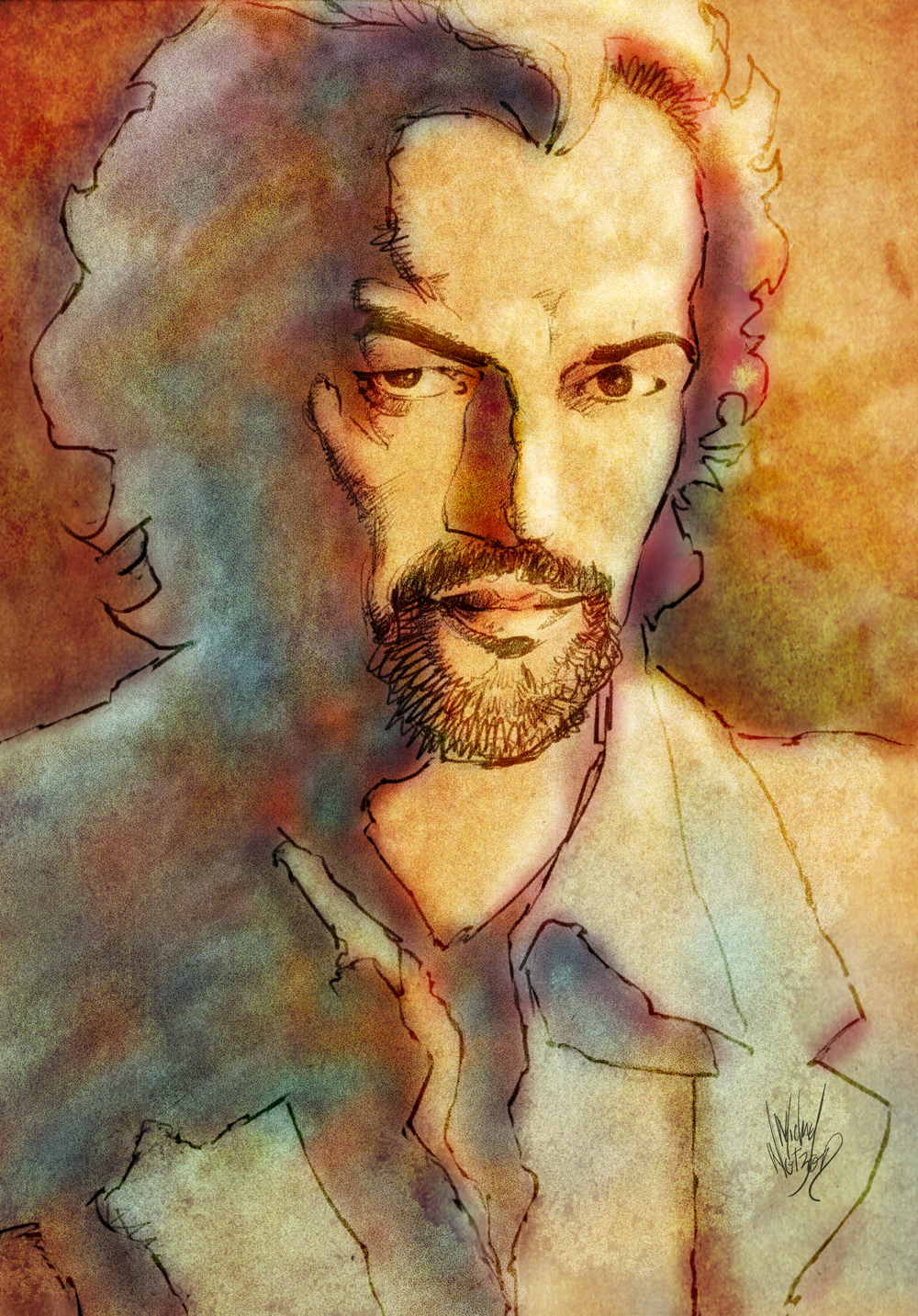
- Portrait of Windsor-Smith by Michael Netzer
- Born: Barry Smith; 25 May 1949 (age 77) Forest Gate, London, England
- Areas: Writer, Artist
- Notable works: Conan; Red Sonja; Machine Man; Weapon X; Solar; Unity; Archer & Armstrong; Rune; Barry Windsor-Smith: Storyteller
- Awards: Shazam Award, 1974; Eisner Award Hall of Fame Inductee, 2008; Eisner Award Best Graphic Novel, Monsters, 2022; Eisner Award Letterer, Monsters, 2022; Eisner Award Best Writer/Artist, Monsters, 2022

Barry Windsor-Smith (born Barry Smith, 25 May 1949) is a British comic book illustrator and painter whose best-known work has been produced in the United States. He attained note working on Marvel Comics' Conan the Barbarian from 1970 to 1973, and for his 1991 serial "Weapon X". His other noted Marvel work included a 1984 "Thing" story in Marvel Fanfare, the "Lifedeath" and "Lifedeath II" stories with writer Chris Claremont that focused on the de-powered Storm in The Uncanny X-Men, as well as the 1984 Machine Man limited series with Herb Trimpe and Tom DeFalco.

After leaving Marvel, Windsor-Smith became the creative director and lead artist at Valiant Comics, where he illustrated the company's revival of the 1960s Gold Key Comics character Solar, and created the original characters Archer and Armstrong. He was also the chief designer of the "Unity" crossover storyline. After leaving Valiant in 1993, Windsor-Smith did work through a number of publishers, including co-creating the vampiric character Rune with Chris Ulm, which was published as part of Malibu Comics' Ultraverse. Rune's adventures included a crossover with Conan that Windsor-Smith wrote and illustrated. He also provided art for the WildStorm Productions/Image Comics storyline "Wildstorm Rising", though he later came to regret that work. He subsequently created an oversized anthology series, Barry Windsor-Smith: Storyteller through Dark Horse Comics, though it was cancelled after nine issues.

Windsor-Smith released his subsequent work through Fantagraphics, including the Storyteller spin-off Adastra in Africa, which had originally been conceived as a "Lifedeath III" story for Storm; two volumes of the retrospective hardcover art book Opus; and Monsters, a 360-page hardcover published in 2021 that had originally been conceived in the mid-1980s as a Hulk story. In 2022, Barry Windsor-Smith won Eisner Awards for Best Graphic Novel, Best Letterer, and Best Writer/Artist for Monsters.

== Early life ==
Barry Windsor-Smith was born Barry Smith on 25 May 1949 in Forest Gate, East End of London. He displayed artistic abilities at an early age and practiced drawing by copying Wally Wood artwork in Mad magazine and the works of Leonardo da Vinci, with little regard for what was or was not considered fine art. His parents supported him in following an arts education and he attended East Ham Technical College for three years, earning degrees in Industrial Design and Illustration.

== Career ==
Windsor-Smith produced his first published work in 1967 and 1968 – single page "Powerhouse Pinups" of Marvel Comics characters for Terrific and Fantastic comics, titles published by Odhams Press that included licensed Marvel Comics reprints for the UK market. Following this, he flew to the U.S. in summer 1968 with fellow artist Steve Parkhouse for meetings at Marvel in New York. "I sent material first, and based solely upon a pleasant return note from Stan [Lee]'s assistant Linda Fite, my pal and me were at Marvel's doorstep in the blink of an eye." Largely due to his Jack Kirbyesque style, Marvel Comics Editor Stan Lee gave him the job of drawing both the cover and story of X-Men No. 53 (cover-dated Feb. 1969), credited to Barry Smith as he was then known. He drew Marvel's Daredevil #50–52 (March–May 1969), a Western short story, "Half Breed" (probably the story "Outcast" eventually published in Western Gunfighters No. 4, Feb. 1971), and issue #12 of Nick Fury, Agent of S.H.I.E.L.D. (May 1969), both scripted by Parkhouse. Windsor-Smith later called his early art "amateur and klutzy" and a "less than skillful" Kirby imitation, but Stan Lee liked it enough to give him more work.

Despite this, Roy Thomas assigned him issues No. 66 and No. 67 of Avengers (July–Aug. 1969) after he had returned to the UK. These stories introduced the fictitious indestructible metal alloy adamantium. He continued to work at a distance for Marvel, providing the art for a number of stories in the horror anthology titles Tower of Shadows and Chamber of Darkness. Thomas, a long-time fan of Robert E. Howard's 1930 pulp-fiction character Conan the Barbarian, had Windsor-Smith provide art for a sword and sorcery story, "Starr the Slayer", in Chamber of Darkness No. 4 (April 1970). Soon afterwards, Thomas offered Windsor-Smith the job as penciller for Marvel's adaptation of Conan, starting with Conan the Barbarian No. 1 (Oct. 1970). In 1971, Windsor-Smith moved to the United States, having been granted a work permit. Comics historian Les Daniels noted that Windsor-Smith's "initial efforts were slightly sketchy, but his technique progressed by leaps and bounds. Within a few months he had achieved a style never seen in comics before."

Cover of Conan the Barbarian #1 (Oct. 1970). Cover art by Windsor-Smith and John Verpoorten

During his run on Conan the Barbarian, Windsor-Smith was involved in the writing as well. He and writer Roy Thomas adapted a number of R.E. Howard short stories, the aforementioned "The Frost-Giant's Daughter", "Tower of the Elephant", "Rogues in the House", and "Red Nails". As well as the art and story contributions, Windsor-Smith provided the covers for most issues. They worked on original adventures and characters based on R.E. Howard's characters – most notably the flame-haired warrior-woman, Red Sonja – loosely based on a character from one of Howard's non-Conan stories, who has now become a major comics character in her own right – in "The Song of Red Sonja" in Conan the Barbarian No. 24 (March 1973), Windsor-Smith's last issue of the title. By then he had worked on 21 of the first 24 issues of the series, missing only issues No. 17 and No. 18, and No. 22 (which was a reprint of issue #1), and both he and the title had won a number of awards. Windsor-Smith would later say that the reason he missed those issues was because he had quit the series a number of times as he was dissatisfied with the work and how the comics business worked, rather than the deadline problems Marvel quoted. In 2010, Comics Bulletin ranked Thomas and Windsor-Smith's work on Conan the Barbarian seventh on its list of the "Top 10 1970s Marvels".

Windsor-Smith provided the art for a number of other Marvel Comics titles, including the Ka-Zar stories in Astonishing Tales #3–6 (December 1970 – June 1971) and No. 10 (February 1972), three further issues of The Avengers (#98–100, April–June 1972) – about which he would later remember the nightmare of drawing "all those bloody characters that I didn't give tuppence about", Iron Man No. 47 (June 1972), and Marvel Premiere #3–4 (July–September 1972), which featured Doctor Strange, both of which were apparently re-scripted by Stan Lee after being drawn to Lee's original scripts. Windsor-Smith was by now becoming disillusioned with the comics industry and the way in which in his opinion the writers and artists were being exploited: "I needed to be free of constraints and policies that were imposed by the dictates of creating entertainment for children" Shortly thereafter, Windsor-Smith left comics for the first time, leaving only a couple of inventory items in the Marvel Comics vaults, both stories of R.E. Howard characters: Kull in "Exile of Atlantis" (Savage Sword of Conan No. 3, December 1974), and Bran Mak Morn in "Worms of the Earth" (Savage Sword of Conan No. 16, November 1975). Other than ten pages of inking of Jack Kirby pencil work for Captain America's Bicentennial Battles (1976), a one-off oversize Marvel Treasury Edition, he produced no more comics work until 1983.

At this point he changed his professional surname to Windsor-Smith, adding his mother's surname to his own, and began to pursue a career in fine art. Granted residential status in the United States in 1974, Windsor-Smith, along with his partner Linda Lessman, set up Gorblimey Press, through which he released a small number of limited-edition prints of fantasy-based subjects that proved popular. In 1976 Windsor-Smith published The Gorblimey Press Catalogue, a high quality index to the work published by Gorblimey Press, with full-page reproductions of each piece. Prior to that, in 1975, together with Jeff Jones, Michael Kaluta, and Bernie Wrightson, he was one of four comic book artists-turned-fine-illustrator/painters who formed a small artist's loft commune in Manhattan known as The Studio, with the aim of pursuing creative products outside the constraints of comic book commercialism. By 1979 they had produced enough material to issue an art book under the name The Studio, which was published by Dragon's Dream.

=== 1980s ===
Smith designed and drew the fictitious comic strip "Mandro" for the 1981 Oliver Stone horror film The Hand. In the film, the artwork is used as that of character Jon Lansdale, a comic book illustrator played by Michael Caine. Stone explains the hiring of Smith thus:

I'd always been a fan of his. I think I fell in love with his version of Conan before I had even read the Howard books. He did more for that comic than anyone…Since the cartoonist was drawing a Conan-type character, Barry was the logical choice. Oddly enough, Barry was English, as was Michael, and they both have sandy blond hair. When they first met, they discovered that they're both about 6' 2", and that they both have the same sort of East End wit. The similarity was quite amazing.

Windsor-Smith returned to mainstream comics work for Marvel in 1983 with two pieces, a short mystical tale of love, "The Beguiling", and a dark, humorous two-page black-and-white story, "A Path of Stars", both in Epic Illustrated No. 16 (February 1983), which featured a page-and-a-half Windsor-Smith spread accompanying an Archie Goodwin text story called "The Horde", which appears to be a drawing of Conan and Valeria in battle. Later the same year he produced a short piece in Dave Sim's Swords of Cerebus (#5, 1983), followed in 1984 by several Marvel superhero stories: an untitled story, though usually referred to as "that night...", and an April Fool's story of The Thing in Marvel Fanfare No. 15 (July 1984), which he wrote and drew. He illustrated "Lifedeath" a double-sized Storm story in The Uncanny X-Men No. 186 (October 1984), and a four-issue Machine Man limited series (October 1984 – January 1985), for which Windsor-Smith was artist and colorist over Herb Trimpe layouts for the first three issues, and drew and colored alone for the fourth. Although he would return to the X-Men once a year for the next three years, (Uncanny X-Men No. 198, #205 and #214), his mainstream comics output remained limited throughout the rest of the 1980s, amounting to just one issue each of Fantastic Four (#296, November 1986) and Daredevil (#236, November 1986), two issues of Iron Man (#232, July 1988 and No. 243, June 1989), two pages for DC Comics' Heroes Against Hunger benefit project, and two small pieces for the Harvey Award-winning comics anthology A1 published by Atomeka Press. In 1987 he returned to his first major success and provided new painted covers for nine issues of Marvel's Conan reprint title The Conan Saga, all issues which contained black-and-white reprints of his original 1970s stories.

=== 1990s ===
Cover of Marvel Comics Presents #79 (Mar. 1991). Cover art by Windsor-Smith

Together with the X-Men spin-off Excalibur (#27, September 1990), Windsor-Smith's last work for Marvel Comics came with the serialized "Weapon X" feature in Marvel Comics Presents #72–84 (1991), his telling of the origin of the X-Men character Wolverine which he wrote, drew, inked, colored, and co-lettered. Though Weapon X depicts Wolverine being infused with adamantium, acquiring claws, and lapsing into his "animal state" for the first time, Windsor-Smith has denied that he intended the story as Wolverine's origin: "I didn't realize that I was doing anything that important in the Wolverine mythos or canon. ... If it's important in the Wolverine canon, if I'd thought of it that way, I probably would have had to be begged off doing it because it's somebody else's game. I was just looking for something to do." In late 1991, he was approached by Valiant Comics, a new comics publisher founded by former Marvel Comics writer and editor-in-chief Jim Shooter, and asked to act as their creative director and lead artist. Valiant had obtained a number of characters originally published in the 1960s and 1970s by Gold Key Comics: Magnus Robot Fighter, Doctor Solar and Turok Dinosaur Hunter, and added their own original titles to the roster, including Harbinger, X-O Manowar, Shadowman, Archer and Armstrong, Eternal Warrior, Bloodshot, Ninjak, and Rai.

Windsor-Smith was the chief designer of the "Unity" crossover storyline for Valiant Comics, and writer and artist for most of the first dozen issues of the title Archer and Armstrong. By focusing on storytelling and innovative marketing practices such as a tightly knit continuity, crossovers and send away issues Valiant quickly became a considerable success story, selling nearly two million copies of premiere issues and rapidly becoming the third largest comic book publisher in the U.S., after Marvel and DC Comics. However, in 1993 Windsor-Smith once again found himself in opposition to company employment policies when Valiant decided to adopt the same work for hire practices that he had disliked in Marvel Comics, and became dissatisfied with his position in the company: "They needed me as a figurehead just as much as a creator." He left Valiant soon after Jim Shooter's departure from the company. Smith has called work-for-hire contracts "a legal but unethical instrument designed to rape and plunder young talents of every possible prerogative they would otherwise possess if they had the fortune to work for more scrupulous, morally invested, publishers."

Of his work for Valiant, and the problems he encountered there over legal ownership of titles and characters, Windsor-Smith said in 2008, "In the 1970s I was constantly asked when I would 'do Conan again'. In these latter years I receive e-mails imploring me to return to Archer and Armstrong. My short reply is, 'When pigs fly to the Moon and return home safely.'"

Since leaving Valiant, Windsor-Smith has worked for a number of companies. For Malibu's Ultraverse line he co-created Rune with Chris Ulm, including a crossover one-shot comic titled Conan vs. Rune published by Marvel Comics in 1994 after they took over Malibu. As a result he once again came up against legal ownership problems, and the Rune stories have remained un-reprinted as a result. For Image Comics he worked on the crossover storyline "Wildstorm Rising", drawing and coloring Wildstorm Rising No. 1 (May 1995), and all eleven of the covers for the interlinked series. Windsor-Smith later said that he was talked into illustrating Wildstorm Rising, and regretted participating in it, stating that in reading the story and illustrating it, he could not understand the motivations of any of the characters, even when he read earlier Wildstorm books featuring the characters. He says he altered the plot in an attempt to improve it and his enthusiasm for it, later learning that writer James Robinson was not pleased with his doing so.

In 1995 Windsor-Smith created an oversized anthology series, Barry Windsor-Smith: Storyteller for Dark Horse Comics that contained three ongoing features: "The Paradoxman", a dark science-fiction tale, "Young GODS", a homage to Jack Kirby's Thor and New Gods series, and "The Freebooters", a lighthearted action series about an ageing Conan-like character grown older and heavier and now running a tavern. He cancelled Storyteller after nine issues, even though a tenth issue had been completed; since then Fantagraphics has issued hardcover collections of "Young GODS" and "The Freebooters". Each of these hardcover volumes includes supplemental features, essays and previously unseen art. Fantagraphics has published Windsor-Smith's Adastra in Africa, a hardcover starring a character from "Young GODS" in a story originally intended to be published as "Lifedeath III" for Marvel's X-Men, with the character Storm. In 1999 Fantagraphics published two volumes of BWS – Opus, a hardcover art books featuring Windsor-Smith's work from throughout his career, including an autobiographical story, "Time Rise", which features details of his experiences with seemingly paranormal phenomena. He was working on a Superman story in 1999 that has not yet seen print.

=== 2000s ===
Windsor-Smith created a story called "UFO POV," an 11-page story in Streetwise (July 2000), a trade paperback anthology published by TwoMorrows Publishing. In 2000 and 2001 he also produced cover art for a number of Marvel titles including Grant Morrison's New X-Men, and drew five pages of Wolverine #166 (Sept. 2001), a "Weapon X" tie-in written by Frank Tieri. In January 2004, Fantagraphics published Windsor-Smith's Young Gods and Friends, a hardcover collecting material from Barry Windsor-Smith: Storyteller along with new material. November 2005 saw a follow-up hardcover titled The Freebooters, again collecting material from Storyteller with new material. A planned third and final volume, collecting "The Paradoxman" serial, has not yet been released. In January 2006, Windsor-Smith announced on the website Comic Book Galaxy that he was in negotiations to publish a graphic novel for Marvel Comics starring The Thing.

=== 2020s ===
Windsor-Smith's next work was Monsters, a 366-page graphic novel that began life as a 23-page Hulk story in 1984 or 1985, and was released on 27 April 2021 by Fantagraphics, Windsor-Smith's first book in 16 years. Windsor-Smith describes the book as one that "explores the life and times of two disparate American families fatefully connected by an abandoned Nazi project in genetic engineering that has been covertly revived by the US government". Windsor-Smith wrote, drew, inked, and lettered the entire graphic novel, which Sam Leith, writing for The Guardian, said was "a rare niche" that Windsor-Smith had carved out for himself as an auteur. The book won the 2022 Eisner Awards for Best Graphic Novel, Best Writer/Artist, and Best Lettering.

== Artistic style ==
Windsor-Smith's work at Marvel during the 1960s was reminiscent of Jack Kirby, with characters making dynamic poses. During his time on Conan the Barbarian, Windsor-Smith developed an art style preferring Romantic illustration over sequential storytelling that had influences from fine artists such as Howard Pyle and Andrew Wyeth. Windsor-Smith has been credited with introducing Romantic art to American comics, although he has said this was not an intentional decision so much as a way to bring something new to comic book art at the time. He has also claimed to be an uncredited co-writer on the majority of his comics work.

== Personal life ==
As of 2021, Windsor-Smith was living in the United States, which had been his home since 1971.

== Awards ==
- 1970 – Academy of Comic Book Arts Shazam Awards Best Individual Story ("Lair of the Beast Men," by Roy Thomas and Barry Smith, from Conan the Barbarian #2) (nominated)
- 1971 – Academy of Comic Book Arts Awards Best Continuing Feature (Conan the Barbarian) (winner)
- 1971 – Shazam Award, Academy of Comic Book Arts Awards Best Individual Story ("Devil Wings over Shadizar," by Roy Thomas and Barry Smith, from Conan the Barbarian No. 6 and "Tower of the Elephant," by Roy Thomas and Barry Smith, from Conan the Barbarian #4) (nominated)
- 1972 – Academy of Comic Book Arts Awards Best Individual Story Dramatic ("The Black Hound of Vengeance," by Roy Thomas and Barry Smith, from Conan the Barbarian #20) (nominated)
- 1973 – Academy of Comic Book Arts Awards Best Continuing Feature (Conan the Barbarian) (nominated)
- 1973 – Academy of Comic Book Arts Awards Best Individual Story Dramatic ("Song of Red Sonja," by Roy Thomas and Barry Smith, from Conan the Barbarian #24) (winner)
- 1973 — Goethe Award Favorite Pro Artist (winner)
- 1973 – British Fantasy Society Awards Best Comic (Conan the Barbarian) (winner)
- 1974 – Academy of Comic Book Arts Awards Best Individual Story Dramatic ("Red Nails," by Roy Thomas and Barry Smith, from Savage Tales #1–3) (nominated)
- 1974 – Shazam Award for Superior Achievement by an Individual (nominated)
- 1974 – British Fantasy Society Awards Best Comic (Conan the Barbarian) (winner)
- 1975 – Inkpot Award (winner)
- 1975 – British Fantasy Society Awards Best Comic (The Savage Sword of Conan) (winner)
- 1976 – British Fantasy Society Awards Best Comic (The Savage Sword of Conan) (winner)
- 1977 – Eagle Awards Favourite Comicbook Artist (nominated)
- 1985 – Haxtur Awards Best Long Story (Machine Man) (nominated)
- 1985 – Haxtur Awards Best Drawing (Machine Man) (nominated)
- 1990 – Gem Award for Outstanding Service and Product Best Comic under $3 (Deathmate Prologue) (nominated)
- 1997 – Comics Buyer's Guide Fan Awards Favorite Colorist (nominated)
- 1997 – Harvey Award Best New Series (Barry Windsor-Smith: Storyteller) (nominated)
- 1998 – Comics Buyer's Guide Fan Awards Favorite Colorist (nominated)
- 2008 – Eisner Awards Hall of Fame (winner)
- 2022 – Eisner Award Winner, Best Graphic Novel, Monsters, Fantagraphics
- 2022 – Eisner Award Winner, Best Letterer, Monsters, Fantagraphics
- 2022 – Eisner Award Winner, Best Writer/Artist, Monsters, Fantagraphics

== Bibliography ==
=== DC Comics ===
- Batman 3-D graphic novel (one page pinup) (1990)
- Heroes Against Hunger #1 (1986)
- Sandman Special #1 (one page pinup) (1991)
- Superman Special #1 (one page pinup) (1992)

=== Marvel Comics ===
- Astonishing Tales (Ka-Zar) #3–6, 10 (1971–72)
- Avengers #66–67, 98–100 (1969–72)
- Chamber of Darkness #3–4 (1970)
- Conan the Barbarian #1–16, 19–24 (1970–73)
- Conan vs. Rune #1 (1995)
- Daredevil #50–52, 236 (1969–1986)
- Epic Illustrated #7, 16, 19, 34 (1981–86)
- Excalibur #27 (1990)
- Fantastic Four #296 (among other artists) (1986)
- Iron Man #47, 232, 243 (1972–1989)
- Machine Man, miniseries, #1–4 (1984–85)
- Marvel Comics Presents (Weapon X): #72–84 (1991)
- Marvel Fanfare (The Thing) #15 (1984)
- Marvel Premiere (Doctor Strange) #3–4 (1972)
- Marvel Treasury Special Featuring Captain America's Bicentennial Battles (co-inker) (1976)
- Monsters on the Prowl #9 (1971)
- Nick Fury, Agent of S.H.I.E.L.D. #12 (1969)
- Savage Sword of Conan #3, 16 (1974–76)
- Savage Tales (Conan) #1–4 (1971–74)
- Tower of Shadows #3, 5, 7 (1970)
- Uncanny X-Men #53, 186, 198, 205, 214 (1969–87)
- Western Gunfighters #4 (1971)
- Wolverine #166 (2001)

=== Valiant Comics ===
- Archer & Armstrong #0, 1–6, 8, 10–12 (1992–93)
- Eternal Warrior #1 (two pages only), 6–8 (1992–93)
- Solar, Man of the Atom #1–10 (Valiant, 1991–92)
- Unity #0, 1 (1992)
- X-O Manowar #1 (1992)

=== Other publishers ===
- A1 #1-2 (Atomeka Press, 1989)
- Barry Windsor-Smith: Storyteller #1–9 (Dark Horse, 1996–97)
- Pathways to Fantasy #1 (Pacific, 1984)
- Rune #0, 1–6, Giant-Size #1 (Malibu, 1994–95)
- Swords of Cerebus #5 (Aardvark-Vanaheim, 1983)
- Vampirella #9 "The Boy Who Loved Trees" (Warren, 1971)
- Wildstorm Rising #1 (Image, 1995)

=== Books and compilations ===
- Weapon X. New York: Marvel, 1994. ISBN 0-7851-0033-4. Republished as Wolverine: Weapon X. New York: Marvel, 2009. ISBN 978-0-7851-3726-9 With Jim Novak.
- Barry Windsor-Smith's The Freebooters, Young Gods, The ParadoX-Man. Kingston, New York: Windsor-Smith Studio, 1995(?). OCLC 36362038
- Barry Windsor-Smith: Storyteller volume 1, number 1. Milwaukie, Oregon: Dark Horse, 1996. OCLC 63079005
- Barry Windsor-Smith: Storyteller volume 1, number 2. Milwaukie, Oregon: Dark Horse, 1996. OCLC 63079007
- Adastra in Africa. Seattle: Fantagraphics, 1999. ISBN 1-56097-357-9
- Opus volume 1. Seattle: Fantagraphics, 1999. ISBN 1-56097-367-6
- Opus volume 2. Seattle: Fantagraphics, 2000. ISBN 1-56097-393-5
- Young Gods & Friends. Seattle: Fantagraphics, 2003. ISBN 1-56097-491-5
- with Diana Schutz. The Freebooters Collection. Seattle: Fantagraphics, 2005. ISBN 1-56097-662-4
- with Kerry Gammill et al.. Untitled. New York: Marvel, 2009. ISBN 978-0-7851-4186-0
- Monsters. Seattle: Fantagraphics, 2021. ISBN 978-1-6839-6415-5

Preceded by n/a	Conan the Barbarian artist 1970–1973	Succeeded by John Buscema
