= Goethe Awards =

Comic book fan awards

Goethe Award / Comic Fan Art Award
- Awarded for: Excellence in comic books, as voted on by fans
- Venue: Comic Art Convention (1972, 1974)
- Country: United States of America
- Presented by: Newfangles / The Buyer's Guide to Comics Fandom
- First award: 1971
- Final award: 1975

The Goethe Award, later known as the Comic Fan Art Award, was a series of fan awards for comic book creators in the United States from 1971 to 2010. The award originated in the fanzine Newfangles and was also associated with The Buyer's Guide to Comics Fandom.

Its name comes from Johann Wolfgang von Goethe, who encouraged "the father of comic strips," Rodolphe Töpffer, to publish his stories.

The Comic Art Convention (CAC) twice hosted the presentation of the awards, at the 1972 and 1974 CACs. The format and balloting of the Comics Buyer's Guide Fan Awards, presented by the Comics Buyer's Guide from 1982 to circa 2010, were in many ways derived from the Goethe Award/Comic Fan Art Award.

== Overview ==
The Goethe Awards/Comic Fan Art Awards were tallied yearly for comic books produced during the previous year, and were given out in several categories, separated into people and works, and further divided into professional publications and fanzine/underground publications:

- PEOPLE
  - Favorite Pro Artist/Penciller (1970–1974)
  - Favorite Inker (1974)
  - Favorite Pro Writer (1970–1974)
  - Favorite Pro Editor (1970–1974)
  - Favorite Fan Writer (1970–1973)
  - Favorite Fan Artist (1970–1973)
- WORKS
  - Favorite Pro Comic Book (1970–1974)
  - Favorite Underground Comic/Non-Newsstand Comic (1970–1972)
  - Favorite Comic-Book Story (1970–1973)
  - Favorite Comic-Book Character (1970–1973)
  - Favorite Fanzine (1970–1974)

== History ==
Don & Maggie Thompson created the Goethe Awards in 1971; the Goethe Awards for comics published in 1970 were first published in a 1971 issue of their fanzine Newfangles.

Nominations for the 1972 Goethe Awards (for comics published in 1971) ballot were initially published in The Buyer's Guide to Comics Fandom (TBG), The Monster Times, and Graphic Story World. Nominations were sent in from 335 readers. Ultimately, there were 7 categories with 4-7 nominees in each category. 700 fans voted for the final nominees. The 1972 Goethe Awards were presented July 3, 1972, at the Comic Art Convention, New York City, in a ceremony emceed by Tony Isabella and Carl Gafford. The award results were also published in Comic Art News & Reviews no. 1.

Ballots for the 1973 awards (for works published in 1972) — now renamed the Comic Fan Art Awards — were printed in TBG, Comic Crusader, The Comic Reader, the Gazette Advertiser, The Menomonee Falls Gazette, and Rocket's Blast Comicollector. 1,011 fans cast their votes. The results were published in The Buyer's Guide to Comics Fandom #38 (June 15, 1973).

In 1974, the Thompsons grew frustrated with perceived ballot-stuffing and passed the awards to Tony Isabella. The awards for comics published in 1973 were presented at the 1974 Comic Art Convention, held at the Commodore Hotel, New York City. They were later published in TBG #63 (Aug. 1, 1974).

The final Comic Fan Art Awards (for comics published in 1974) were co-administered by Ken Gale and were not announced until TBG #123 (March 26, 1976).

In 1982, the Comics Buyer's Guide (the successor to The Buyer's Guide to Comics Fandom), began presenting their Comics Buyer's Guide Fan Awards, in many ways modeled on the Goethe Award/Comic Fan Art Award.

== Winners ==
Years represent when the work was published, not when the awards were presented

=== People ===
Favorite Pro Artist/Penciller

- 1970 Neal Adams
- 1971 TK
- 1972 Barry Windsor-Smith
  - Neal Adams
  - Bernie Wrightson
  - Jack Kirby
- 1973 Bernie Wrightson
- 1974 Jim Starlin

Favorite Inker

- 1974 Tom Palmer

Favorite Pro Writer

- 1970 tie
  - Denny O'Neil
  - Roy Thomas
- 1971 TK
- 1972 Roy Thomas
  - Len Wein
  - Jack Kirby
  - Dennis O'Neil
  - Steve Englehart
- 1973 Len Wein
- 1974 Roy Thomas

Favorite Pro Editor

- 1970 Dick Giordano
- 1971 TK
- 1972 Roy Thomas
  - Julius Schwartz
- 1973 Roy Thomas
- 1974 Roy Thomas

Favorite Fan Writer

- 1970 Jan Strnad
- 1971 Tony Isabella
- 1972 Don & Maggie Thompson
  - Tom Fagan
  - Tony Isabella
  - Jan Strnad
  - Paul Levitz
- 1973 Don & Maggie Thompson

Favorite Fan Artist

- 1970 Robert Kline
- 1971 TK
- 1972 Richard Corben
  - Don Newton
  - John Fantucchio
  - Martin Greim
- 1973 Don Newton
  - Howard Bender (3rd runner-up)

=== Works ===
Favorite Pro Comic Book

- 1970 Green Lantern/Green Arrow (DC)
- 1971 TK
- 1972 Conan (Marvel)
  - Swamp Thing
  - Tarzan
  - The Avengers
- 1973 Swamp Thing (DC)
- 1974 E-Man (Charlton)

Favorite Underground Comic/Non-Newsstand Comic

- 1970 Captain George Presents, by George Henderson of Toronto, Canada
- 1971 TK
- 1972 The Menomonee Falls Gazette
  - Bedtime Stories
  - Further Adventures of the Fabulous Furry Freak Brothers
  - Fantagor
  - Skull Comics
  - Phase

Favorite Comic-Book Story

- 1970 "No Evil Shall Escape My Sight" by Denny O'Neil and Neal Adams in Green Lantern/Green Arrow #76 (DC)
- 1971 TK
- 1972 "The Black Hound of Vengeance!" in Conan #20
  - "And Through Him Save a World" in Green Lantern #89
  - "The Pact" in New Gods #20
  - "Dark Genesis" in Swamp Thing #1
- 1973 "Night of the Bat," by Len Wein, Bernie Wrightson, and Joe Orlando in Swamp Thing #7 (DC)

Favorite Comic-Book Character

- 1970 Deadman (DC)
- 1971 TK
- 1972 Conan (Marvel)
  - Batman
  - Spider-Man
  - Tarzan
  - Green Arrow)
- 1973 Conan (Marvel)

Favorite Fanzine

- 1970 Newfangles
- 1971 The Buyer's Guide to Comics Fandom
- 1972 The Comic Reader (edited by Paul Levitz
  - The Buyer's Guide to Comics Fandom
  - Comixscene
  - Comic Crusader
  - Graphic Story World
  - Rocket's Blast Comicollector
- 1973 The Comic Reader (edited by Paul Levitz)
- 1974 The Comic Reader

== Sources ==
- 1970 awards (presented in 1971): Thompson, Maggie (August 19, 2005). "Comics Fan Awards 1961-1970". Comics Buyer's Guide. Archived from the original on September 14, 2015.
- 1971–1974 awards: Miller, John Jackson (July 19, 2005). "GOETHE/COMIC FAN ART AWARD WINNERS, 1971-74". Comics Buyer's Guide. Archived from the original on September 20, 2010.
- 1971 awards (presented in 1972): Seiler, Rick (Sep 1972). "Telegraphics". Comic Art News & Reviews. Vol. 1, no. 1. pp. 3–4.
- 1972 awards (presented in 1973): "1972 Comic Art Awards Results!". The Buyer's Guide to Comics Fandom. No. 38. June 15, 1973. p. 20.
- 1973 awards (presented in 1974): The Buyer's Guide to Comics Fandom. No. 63. Aug 1, 1974.
- 1974 awards (presented in 1975): The Buyer's Guide for Comic Fandom. No. 123. March 26, 1976.
