= Steve Leialoha =

American comic artist (born 1952)

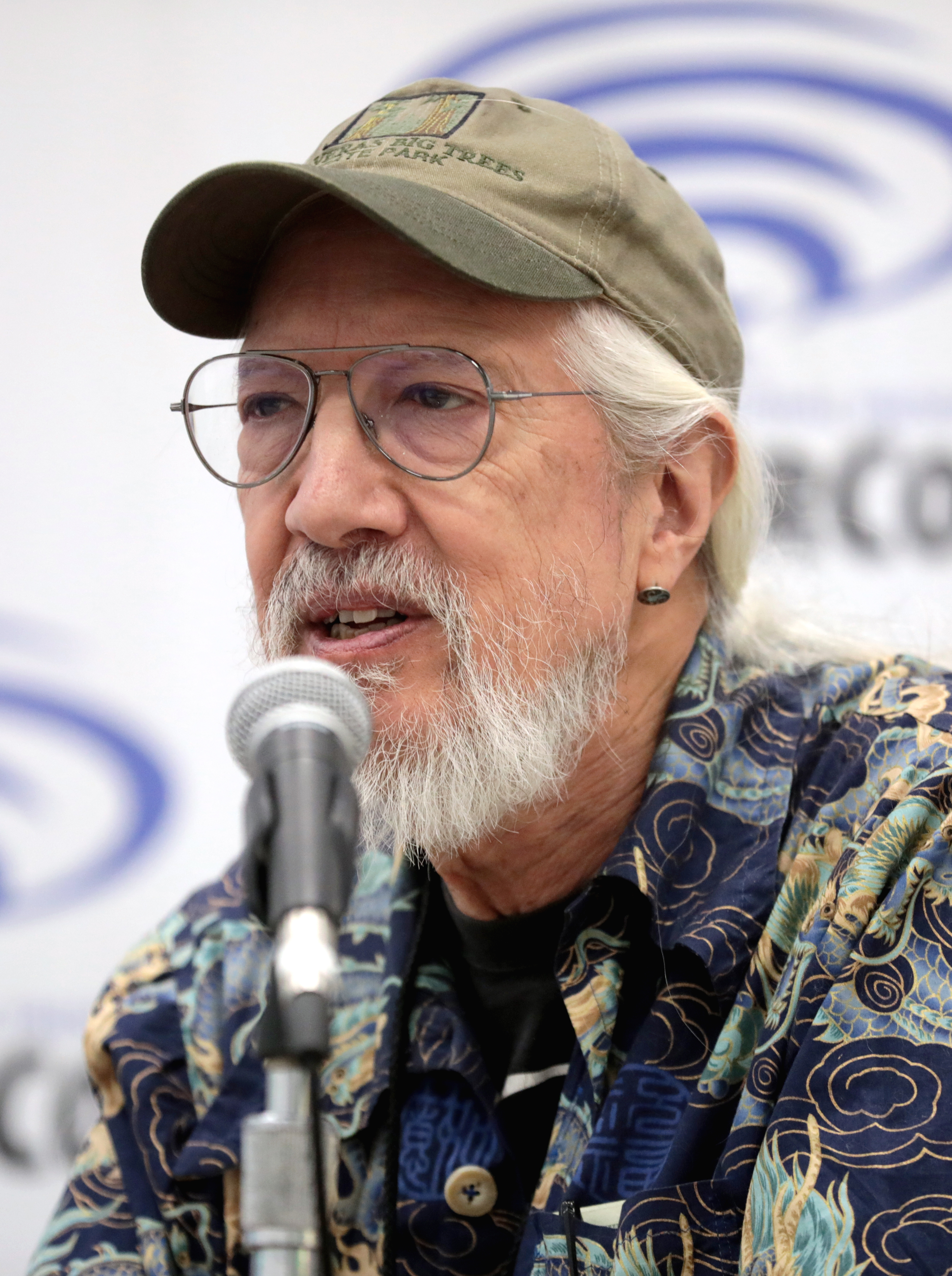
- Leialoha at the 2023 WonderCon
- Born: January 27, 1952 (age 74) San Francisco, California, U.S.
- Areas: Penciller, Inker
- Notable works: Fables; Spider-Woman
- Awards: Inkpot Award 1986; Eisner Awards 2003, 2005, 2006, 2007; Inkwell Awards Joe Sinnott Hall of Fame Award 2026
- Partner: Trina Robbins (from 1977)

Steve Leialoha (born January 27, 1952) is an American comics artist whose work first came to prominence in the 1970s. He has worked primarily as an inker, though occasionally as a penciller, for several publishers, including Marvel Comics and later DC Comics.

== Early life ==
Cover for Spider-Woman #8 (November 1978). Art by Carmine Infantino and Steve Leialoha.

Leialoha was born in San Francisco, California, the son of a Native Hawaiian father. He began reading comics as a child, explaining, "My dad would always give me comics. I mean, he would like to read all sorts of stuff, and he would pass everything along to me. Harvey comics and that kind of thing, when I was six or seven. As I got older, the Marvel Age, which I think of starting like in 1962, I was ten, which is certainly a good age for reading that stuff."

== Career ==
Leialoha's career began in 1975 with the early independent comic book Star*Reach, drawing the five-page story "Wooden Ships on the Water", adapted by writer Mike Friedrich from the song by David Crosby, Stephen Stills, and Paul Kantner, in issue #3 (Sept. 1975). He continued to contribute to Star*Reach and the same publisher's Quack for four years.

Leialoha freelanced as a regular contributor to Marvel from 1976 to 1988, working on such series as Warlock, Star Wars, Spider-Woman, the Spider-Man title Marvel Team-Up, the Firestar limited series, New Mutants and Howard the Duck. He and writer J. M. DeMatteis co-created "Greenberg the Vampire" in Bizarre Adventures #29 (Dec. 1981).

Leialoha was one of the artists on Batman #400 (Oct. 1986) and in the 1990s, he began working at DC Comics on Batman and other characters; at Harris Comics on Vampirella; and at Claypool Comics on Soulsearchers and Company. He inked part of the "World's End" story arc in Neil Gaiman's The Sandman series. The following decade, he became the regular inker on most of the issues of the DC/Vertigo series Fables, penciled by Mark Buckingham, for which they won the Eisner Award for "Best Penciller/Inker Team" in 2007.

== Personal life ==
Leialoha graduated from Oceana High School in 1969.

Leialoha lives in San Francisco. He was partnered with comics artist Trina Robbins until her death in 2024.

Writer Larry Hama named the G.I. Joe character Edward Leialoha (Torpedo) after Leialoha.

== Bibliography ==
=== Claypool Comics ===
- Elvira, Mistress of the Dark #100 (2001)
- Soulsearchers and Company #4–5, 7–8, 10–13, 15–22, 25–26, 28–46, 48–50 (1993–2001)

=== Comico ===
- Fish Police #10 (1988)
- Jonny Quest #4 (1986)

=== Dark Horse Comics ===
- Dark Horse Presents #113–118 (1996–1997)
- GoGirl! #1 (2002)
- Jonny Demon #1–3 (1994)

=== DC Comics ===
- 9-11 – The World's Finest Comic Book Writers & Artists Tell Stories to Remember Volume 2 (2002)
- Action Comics #694 (1993)
- Armageddon: The Alien Agenda #1 (1991)
- Batman #400, Annual #15 (1986–1991)
- Chronos #1–4, 6–7, 9–11 (1998–1999)
- DCU Heroes Secret Files #1 (1999)
- Detective Comics #629 (1991)
- Fly Annual #1 (1992)
- Heroes Against Hunger #1 (1986)
- Hitchhiker's Guide to the Galaxy #1–3 (1993)
- Justice League International #13–15 (1988)
- 'Mazing Man Special #2 (1988)
- Restaurant At The End Of The Universe #1–3 (1994)
- Shadow Strikes #28 (1992)
- Tom Strong's Terrific Tales #9 (2004)
- Who's Who: The Definitive Directory of the DC Universe #4, 11, 19 (1985–1986)
- Who's Who Update '88 #2 (1988)

==== Paradox Press ====
- Big Book of Death (1995)
- Big Book of Grimm (1999)
- Big Book of Little Criminals (1996)
- Big Book of Losers (1997)
- Big Book of the Unexplained (1997)
- Big Book of Weirdos (1995)

==== Vertigo ====
- The Dreaming #24, 47, 56 (1998–2001)
- Fables #1–3, 5–10, 14–17, 19–21, 23–27, 30–33, 36–38, 40–45, 48–50, 52–56, 60–61, 63, 65–69, 71–75, 88–91, 94–98, 100, 102–106, 108–112, 114–121, 125–129, 131–135, 139–162 (2002–2024)
- Jack of Fables #6, 11, 20, 22, 25, 38 (2007–2009)
- Nevada #1–6 (1998)
- Sandman Presents: Deadboy Detectives #1–4 (2001)
- Sandman Presents: Petrefax #1–4 (2000)
- The Unwritten #50 (2013)
- Vertigo Secret Files & Origins: Swamp Thing #1 (2000)
- Vertigo: First Offenses #1 (2005)
- Vertigo: Winter's Edge #1 (1998)

=== Marvel Comics ===
- Alpha Flight #48 (1987)
- Amazing High Adventure #1 (1984)
- Bizarre Adventures #29 (1981)
- Captain America #221, 290 (1978–1984)
- Captain Justice #1–2 (1988)
- Captain Marvel #49 (1977)
- Conan the Barbarian #155 (1984)
- Coyote #1–2, 7–8 (1983–1984)
- Daredevil #154, 238 (1978–1987)
- Doctor Strange vol. 2 #62, 67 (1983–1984)
- Fantastic Four #296 (1986)
- Fantastic Four Roast #1 (1982)
- Firestar #1–4 (1986)
- Further Adventures of Indiana Jones #21 (1984)
- G.I. Joe: A Real American Hero #21, 26 (1984)
- Ghost Rider #35, 56 (1979–1981)
- Heroes for Hope #1 (1985)
- Howard the Duck #1–13 (1976–1977)
- Marvel Comics Presents #82 (1991)
- Marvel Fanfare #45 (1989)
- Marvel Super-Heroes vol. 2 #7 (1991)
- Marvel Team-Up #81–85 (1979)
- Marvel Treasury Edition #28 (Superman and Spider-Man) (1981, background inker)
- Ms. Marvel #14 (1978)
- New Mutants #32–34 (1985)
- Night Thrasher #17 (1994)
- Nova #22–23 (1978–1979)
- Official Handbook Of The Marvel Universe #2, 5, 10 (1983)
- Official Handbook Of The Marvel Universe Deluxe Edition #6, 12 (1986)
- Power Man and Iron Fist #60 (1979)
- Rom #66 (1985)
- Secret Wars II #1–9 (1985–1986)
- Sensational She-Hulk #12 (1990)
- Sergio Aragonés Massacres Marvel #1 (1996)
- The Spectacular Spider-Man #44 (1980)
- Spider-Woman #7, 25–26, 28, 30–46 (1978–1982)
- Star Wars #2–5, 95, 105, Annual #1 (1977–1986)
- Steeltown Rockers #3, 5 (1990)
- Uncanny X-Men #189, 192, 194, 217, 250, 253–255, Annual #7–8 (1983–1989)
- Untold Tales of Spider-Man: Strange Encounters #1 (1998)
- Warlock #9–14 (1975–1976)
- Web of Spider-Man #33 (1987)
- X-Factor #200 (2010)

== Awards ==
- 1986: Won Inkpot Award
- 2003: Won Eisner Award for "Best New Series" and "Best Serialized Story" for Fables #1–5: "Legends in Exile" with Bill Willingham and Lan Medina.
- 2005: Won Eisner Award for "Best Serialized Story", for Fables #19–27: "March of the Wooden Soldiers" with Willingham and Mark Buckingham.
- 2006: Won Eisner Award for "Best Serialized Story", for Fables #36–38, 40–41: "Return to the Homelands" with Willingham and Buckingham.
- 2007: Won Eisner Award for "Best Artist/Penciller/Inker or Penciller/Inker Team", for Fables with Buckingham.
- 2026: Inducted into Inkwell Awards Joe Sinnott Hall of Fame

Preceded by n/a	Howard the Duck inker 1976–1977	Succeeded by Klaus Janson
Preceded by Howard Chaykin	Star Wars inker 1977	Succeeded by Rick Hoberg
Preceded by Trevor Von Eeden	Spider-Woman artist 1980–1982	Succeeded by Brian Postman
