= Chamber of Darkness =

Anthology comic book published by Marvel Comics

- Chamber of Darkness #7 (Oct. 1970), cover art by Bernie Wrightson.

Publication information
- Publisher: Marvel Comics
- Schedule: Bi-monthly
- Format: Ongoing series
- Genre: Dark fantasy
- Publication date: 1969–1974

Creative team
- Artist(s): Tom Sutton, Syd Shores, Tom Palmer, Don Heck, Bernie Wrightson
- Penciller(s): John Buscema, Marie Severin, Barry Windsor-Smith, Jack Kirby, Sal Buscema
- Inker(s): John Verpoorten, Herb Trimpe

Chamber of Darkness is a horror/fantasy anthology comic book published by the American company Marvel Comics. Under this and a subsequent name, it ran from 1969 to 1974. It featured work by creators such as writer-editor Stan Lee, writers Gerry Conway, Archie Goodwin, and Roy Thomas, and artists John Buscema, Johnny Craig, Jack Kirby, Tom Sutton, Barry Windsor-Smith (as Barry Smith), and Bernie Wrightson. Stories were generally hosted by either of the characters Digger, a gravedigger, or Headstone P. Gravely, in undertaker garb, or by one of the artists or writers.

After the eighth issue, the title changed to Monsters on the Prowl, and the comic became almost exclusively a reprint book.

== Original series ==
Designed to compete with DC Comics' successful launches House of Mystery and House of Secrets, Chamber of Darkness, like its companion comic Tower of Shadows, sold poorly despite its selected roster of creators. After its first few issues, the title, published bimonthly, began including reprints of "pre-superhero Marvel" monster stories and other SF/fantasy tales from Marvel's 1950s and early 1960s predecessor, Atlas Comics.

The anthology, in addition to running original stories, also included writer Roy Thomas' and penciler Don Heck's loose adaptation of Edgar Allan Poe's "The Masque of the Red Death", as "The Day of the Red Death", in issue #2 (Dec. 1969). Writer Denny O'Neil and Tom Palmer adapted the Poe story "The Tell-Tale Heart" as "The Tell Tale Heart" in issue #3 (Feb. 1970). Thomas and EC Comics veteran Johnny Craig adapted H. P. Lovecraft's "The Music of Erich Zann" as "The Music From Beyond" in #5 (June 1970).

Industry notable Jack Kirby, in a rare instance of scripting for Marvel before leaving for rival DC Comics for a time in 1970, wrote and penciled "The Monster" in #4 (April 1970), and "And Fear Shall Follow" in #5 (June 1970), both inked by John Verpoorten. Kirby, inked by fellow Golden Age great Bill Everett, also drew the latter issue's cover. Everett himself wrote and inked (with penciler Dan Adkins) the story "Believe It...Or Not" in #8 (Dec. 1970).

Marvel published the all-reprint Chamber of Darkness King-Size Special #1 (Jan. 1972).

== Monsters on the Prowl ==
Retitled Monsters on the Prowl with issue #9 (Feb. 1971), this version ran one new story each issue through #13 (Oct. 1971) with the remaining content consisting of reprints from Atlas Comics, Marvel's 1950s predecessor, and "pre-superhero Marvel", primarily drawn by Jack Kirby or Steve Ditko. It expanded into a double-sized, 25-cent comic for two issues (#13-14, Oct.-Dec. 1971). Some issues of the reprint books featured new covers by John Severin, Marie Severin, Gil Kane, and Herb Trimpe.

A 10-page sword-and-sorcery story starring King Kull, "The Forbidden Swamp", by writer Thomas and art by the Severin siblings, appeared in issue #16 (April 1972); it continued the story from Kull the Conqueror #2 (Sept. 1971), during a 10-month hiatus before that series resumed with #3.

A flashback adventure pitting superheroes against Marvel monsters appeared in a 2005 one-shot comic with the cover trademark Monsters on the Prowl, and the copyrighted title Marvel Monsters: Monsters on the Prowl, as given in its postal indicia.

== Reprints ==
Chamber of Darkness stories reprinted in other Marvel comic books or black-and-white horror-comics magazines:

- "Forewarned Is Four-Armed" (#2, Dec. 1969)

Writers Neal Adams, Roy Thomas, penciler Marie Severin, inker Dan Adkins
Creatures on the Loose #14 (Nov. 1971)

- "The Warlock Tree" (#3, Feb. 1970)

Writer Gerry Conway, penciler Barry Smith, inker Syd Shores
Giant-Size Chillers #3 (Aug. 1975)

- "The Monster" (#4, April 1970)

Writer-penciler Jack Kirby, inker John Verpoorten
Giant-Size Chillers #3 (Aug. 1975)

- "The Sword and the Sorcerers" (#4, April 1970; one-shot character Starr the Slayer)

Writer Roy Thomas, penciler-inker Barry Smith
Conan the Barbarian #16 (July 1972); The Conan Saga #6 (Oct. 1987); The Essential Conan Vol. 1 (Marvel, 2000, ISBN 0-7851-0751-7)
; "Conan Omnibus: The Marvel Years", volume 1, (Marvel, 2019)

- "The Music From Beyond" (#5, June 1970)

Writer Roy Thomas, penciler-inker Johnny Craig
Masters of Terror #2 (Sept. 1975)

- "Gargoyle Every Night" #7 (Oct. 1970)

Writers Bernie Wrightson, Roy Thomas, penciler-inker Bernie Wrightson
Giant-Size Chillers #3 (Aug. 1975); Book of the Dead #1 (Dec. 1993)
