= Tower of Shadows =

Comic Book

- Tower of Shadows #1 (Sept. 1969), cover art by John Romita, Sr.

Publication information
- Publisher: Marvel Comics
- Format: Anthology
- Publication date: 1969–75

Creative team
- Written by: Roy Thomas, Neal Adams, Jim Steranko, Johnny Craig, Wally Wood,
- Artist(s): Neal Adams, John Buscema, Gene Colan, Johnny Craig, Jim Steranko, Tom Sutton, Barry Windsor-Smith, Wally Wood, Bernie Wrightson

Tower of Shadows is a horror/fantasy anthology comic book published by the American company Marvel Comics under this and a subsequent name from 1969 to 1975. It featured work by writer-artists Neal Adams, Jim Steranko, Johnny Craig, and Wally Wood, writer-editor Stan Lee, and artists John Buscema, Gene Colan, Tom Sutton, Barry Windsor-Smith (as Barry Smith), and Bernie Wrightson.

The stories were generally hosted by Digger, a gravedigger; Headstone P. Gravely, in undertaker garb; or one of the artists or writers.

After the 10th issue, the title was changed to Creatures on the Loose, publishing a mixture of sword and sorcery features, horror/fantasy reprints, and the science-fiction werewolf feature "Man-Wolf".

== Original series ==
Designed to compete with DC Comics' successful launches of House of Mystery and House of Secrets, Tower of Shadows, like its companion comic Chamber of Darkness, sold poorly despite the roster of artists featured. After its first few issues, the title, published bimonthly, began including reprints of "pre-superhero Marvel" monster stories and other SF/fantasy tales from Marvel's 1950s and early 1960s predecessor, Atlas Comics. After the ninth issue, the title changed to Creatures on the Loose, and the comic became a mix of reprints and occasional sword and sorcery/SF series.

"At the Stroke of Midnight", writer-artist Jim Steranko's lead story in the premiere issue (Sept. 1969), won a 1969 Alley Award for Best Feature Story. Its creation had led to a rift between the celebrated Steranko and editor Lee that caused Steranko to stop freelancing for Marvel, the publisher that had showcased his highly influential work. Lee had rejected Steranko's cover, and the two clashed over panel design, dialog, and the story title, initially "The Lurking Fear at Shadow House". According to Steranko at a 2006 panel and elsewhere, Lee disliked or did not understand the homage to horror author H. P. Lovecraft, and devised his own title for the story. After much conflict, Marvel and freelancer Steranko parted ways. Lee phoned him about a month later, after the two had cooled down, and Steranko would return to produce several covers for Marvel from 1972 to 1973.

In a contemporaneous interview, conducted November 14, 1969, Steranko reflected on the tiff:

The reason I had a little altercation with them is because they edited some of my work. They changed certain things that I didn't feel should be changed. And I insisted that we couldn't continue on that basis. ... For example, my horror story "At the Stroke of Midnight" had a line of dialogue added. The meek husband said, "I'm nervous because it's closer to midnight" or something like that; simply a gratuitous line. It wasn't my title and it didn't have that line in it. Stan originally wanted that story to be called "Let Them Eat Cake", which I didn't approve of. We had disagreements about the way I told stories. ... If you're a publisher and you want my work, you get it my way or you don't get it at all. ... Anyway, I have an agreement now, a working agreement with them, and everything's cool.

A Lovecraft story, "The Terrible Old Man", appeared two issues later, adapted by writer Roy Thomas and penciler Windsor-Smith. Additionally, Thomas and Tom Palmer – a renowned inker in a rare example of his penciling and inking – adapted the Lovecraft story "Pickman's Model" in issue #9 (Jan. 1971).

Marvel also published the all-reprint Tower of Shadows King-Size Special #1 (Dec. 1971).

== Creatures on the Loose ==
Retitled Creatures on the Loose with issue #10 (March 1971), this version led off with a seven-page King Kull sword-and-sorcery story by Thomas and artist Bernie Wrightson. The book included new stories by artists Herb Trimpe in #11, Syd Shores in #12, and Reed Crandall in #13, then became all-reprint until issue #16 (March 1972). There, writer Thomas and the art team of Gil Kane and Bill Everett introduced the feature "Gullivar Jones, Warrior of Mars", starring an interplanetary Earthman created by author Edwin L. Arnold in his 1905 book Lieut. Gullivar Jones: His Vacation. Following another issue by Thomas and one by Gerry Conway, science fiction novelist George Alec Effinger wrote the final three installments.

Effinger continued as writer for the series that immediately followed, in issue #22 (March 1973): "Thongor! Warrior of Lost Lemuria!", adapting a sword-and-sorcery barbarian character created by author Lin Carter. Following writers Jenny Blake Isabella and Gardner Fox, Carter himself co-wrote (with Steve Gerber) the final two installments.

Thomas, Marvel's associate editor at the time, recalled in 2007 that Thongor had been the company's first choice when Marvel decided to publish a licensed fantasy character, rather than the eventual hit Conan the Barbarian. Publisher Martin Goodman "authorized us to go after a character. I first went after Lin Carter's Thongor, who was a quasi-Conan with elements of John Carter of Mars, partly became editor-in-chief Stan Lee liked that name the most ... I soon got stalled by Lin Carter's agent on Thongor (he was hoping I'd offer more than the $150 per issue I was authorized to offer), and I got a sudden impulse to go after Conan".

The title's last series, "Man-Wolf", starred John Jameson, a werewolf and the son of Spider-Man supporting character J. Jonah Jameson. It ran from issue #30–37 (July 1974 -Sept. 1975). Its writers were Doug Moench, Isabella, and David Anthony Kraft, with art by pencilers George Tuska and George Pérez. The series depicted Jameson as a god to an alien race. The series was finally finished years later in Marvel Premiere #45–46 (Dec. 1978 and Feb. 1979).

== Reprints ==
Tower of Shadows stories reprinted in other Marvel comic books or black-and-white horror-comics magazines:

- "At the Stroke of Midnight" (#1, Sept. 1969)

Writer-artist Jim Steranko
Marvel Visionaries: Steranko (Marvel, 2002, ISBN 0-7851-0944-7)

- "One Hungers" (#2, Nov. 1969)

Writer-penciler Neal Adams, inker Dan Adkins
Monsters Unleashed #8 (Oct. 1974)

- "The Moving Finger Writhes" (#3, Jan. 1970)

Writer Len Wein, penciler Gene Colan, inker Mike Esposito (under pen name Joe Gaudioso)
Giant-Size Chillers #3 (Aug. 1975)

- "The Terrible Old Man" (#3, Jan. 1970)

Writer Roy Thomas, penciler Barry Smith, inkers Dan Adkins, John Verpoorten
Masters of Terror #1 (July 1975)

- "Contact!" (#6, July 1970)

Writer-artist Tom Sutton
Supernatural Thrillers #11 (Feb. 1975)

- "Sanctuary!" (#8, Nov. 1970)

Writer-artist Wally Wood
Conan the Barbarian #47 (Feb. 1975)

- "Pickman's Model" (#9, Jan. 1971)

Writer Roy Thomas, penciler-inker Tom Palmer
Masters of Terror #2 (Sept. 1975)

=== Collected editions ===
- Man-Wolf: The Complete Collection includes Creatures on the Loose #30–37, 408 pages, October 2019, 978-1302920005
- Lost Marvels Vol. 1: Tower of Shadows includes Tower of Shadows #1-9, 176 pages, Fantagraphics, April 2025. 979-8875000379
