= Heroes Against Hunger =

Comic book

- The cover of Heroes Against Hunger (DC Comics, 1986). Artwork by Neal Adams & Dick Giordano.

Publication information
- Publisher: DC Comics
- Format: One-shot
- Genre: Superhero
- Publication date: 1986
- No. of issues: 1
- Main character(s): Superman and Batman

Creative team
- Created by: Jim Starlin and Bernie Wrightson
- Written by: List: Jim Starlin; Cary Bates; Elliot S. Maggin; Paul Levitz; Mike W. Barr; Michael Fleisher; Bob Rozakis; Roy Thomas; J. M. DeMatteis; Robert Bloch; Robert Loren Fleming; Marv Wolfman; Tony Isabella; Gerry Conway; Barbara Randall; Andy Helfer; Dan Mishkin; Len Wein; Ed Hannigan; Mindy Newell; Steve Englehart; Joey Cavalieri; Paul Kupperberg; Doug Moench
- Pencillers: List: George Pérez; Paris Cullins; Denys Cowan; Jan Duursema; Keith Giffen; Ross Andru; José Luis García-López; Carmine Infantino; Marshall Rogers; Bernie Wrightson; Joe Brozowski; Sal Amendola; Curt Swan; Barry Windsor-Smith; Ernie Colón; Walt Simonson; Eduardo Barreto; Dave Gibbons; Jack Kirby; Tony Salmons; Dan Jurgens; Joe Kubert; David Ross; Jim Sherman
- Inkers: List: Kim DeMulder; Tony DeZuniga; Val Mayerik; Alfredo Alcala; Joe Staton; Klaus Janson; Jerry Ordway; Murphy Anderson; Karl Kesel; Michael Kaluta; Gray Morrow; Jim Aparo; John Byrne; Jeff Jones; Terry Austin; Steve Leialoha; Romeo Tanghal; Bruce Patterson; Al Milgrom; Tom Mandrake; Bill Wray; Josef Rubinstein; Howard Chaykin; Greg Theakston; Alan Weiss
- Letterers: List: Helen Vesik; Carrie Spiegle; Duncan Andrews; John Workman; Agustin Mas; Milt Snapinn; John Costanza; Bob Lappan; Bob Pinaha; Albert DeGuzman; Todd Klein; Andy Kubert
- Colorists: List: Daina Grazanus; Michele Wolfman; Gene D'Angelo; Carl Gafford; Anthony Tollin; Tom Ziuko; George Roberts; Liz Berube; Nansi Hoolahan; Tatjana Wood; Joe Orlando; Adrienne Roy; Bob LeRose
- Editor: Robert Greenberger

Heroes Against Hunger is a 1986 all-star benefit comic book for African famine relief and recovery. Published by DC Comics in the form of a "comic jam" or exquisite corpse, the book starred Superman and Batman. Spearheaded by Jim Starlin and Bernie Wrightson, all proceeds from the comic went to hunger relief in Africa.

== Publication history ==
Heroes Against Hunger came about in response to the devastating 1983–85 famine in Ethiopia. The concept was nearly identical to the earlier benefit comic, Heroes for Hope, published by Marvel Comics in 1985 (which was also spearheaded by Wrightson and Starlin), and was in the spirit of contemporaneous musical fund-raisers like Band Aid's "Do They Know It's Christmas?", USA for Africa's "We Are the World", and the Live Aid concerts.

== Plot ==
In a story called "A Song of Pain and Sorrow!", Superman, Batman, and Lex Luthor try to curtail the Ethiopian famine. While there, they interact with Peace Corps member Lee Ann Layton. Their antagonist is a green-skinned, four-armed giant with a keyboard embedded on his chest called the Master. The Master feeds on entropy, so he is strengthened by the Ethiopian famine.

== Contributors ==
The story was plotted by Jim Starlin with a plot assist from Bernie Wrightson. The editor was Robert Greenberger. Front cover penciled by Neal Adams, with inks by Dick Giordano; back cover by Bill Sienkiewicz. Logo design by Gaspar Saladino.

There were 100 contributors to the project. In addition to Starlin and Wrightson, a number of Heroes for Hope contributors also donated their creative labors to Heroes Against Hunger, including John Byrne, Howard Chaykin, John Costanza, Steve Englehart, Klaus Janson, Jeffrey Catherine Jones, Michael Kaluta, Steve Leialoha, Al Milgrom, Gray Morrow, Josef Rubinstein, Bill Sienkiewicz, Walt Simonson, and Alan Weiss.

Pages	Writer	Penciler	Inker	Letterer	Colorist
1, 48	Jim Starlin	George Pérez	Kim DeMulder	Helen Vesik	Daina Grazanus
2-3	Cary Bates	Paris Cullins	Tony DeZuniga	Carrie Spiegle	Michele Wolfman
4–5	Elliot S. Maggin	Denys Cowan	Val Mayerik	Carrie Spiegle	Michele Wolfman
6-7	Paul Levitz	Jan Duursema	Alfredo Alcala	Helen Vesik	Gene D'Angelo
8–9	Mike W. Barr	Keith Giffen	Joe Staton	Duncan Andrews	Carl Gafford
10-11	Michael Fleisher	Ross Andru	Klaus Janson	John Workman	Carl Gafford
12-13	Bob Rozakis	José Luis García-López	Jerry Ordway	Agustin Mas	Anthony Tollin
14–15	Roy Thomas	Carmine Infantino	Murphy Anderson	Milt Snapinn	Tom Ziuko
16-17	J. M. DeMatteis	Marshall Rogers	Karl Kesel	John Costanza	George Roberts
18–19	Robert Bloch	Bernie Wrightson	Michael Kaluta	Bob Lappan	Anthony Tollin
20–21	Robert Loren Fleming	Joe Brozowski	Gray Morrow	Bob Pinaha	Gene D'Angelo
22–23	Marv Wolfman	Sal Amendola	Jim Aparo	Albert DeGuzman	Liz Berube
24-25	Tony Isabella	Curt Swan	John Byrne	Todd Klein	Nansi Hoolahan
26–27	Gerry Conway	Barry Windsor-Smith	Jeff Jones	Todd Klein	Tatjana Wood
28–29	Barbara Randall	Ernie Colón	Terry Austin	Agustin Mas	Nansi Hoolahan
30–31	Andy Helfer	Walt Simonson	Steve Leialoha	John Workman	Joe Orlando
32-33	Dan Mishkin	Eduardo Barreto	Romeo Tanghal	Helen Vesik	Liz Berube
34-35	Len Wein	Dave Gibbons	Bruce Patterson	John Costanza	George Roberts
36-37	Ed Hannigan	Jack Kirby	Al Milgrom	Duncan Andrews	Tom Ziuko
38–39	Mindy Newell	Tony Salmons	Tom Mandrake	Bob Pinaha	Joe Orlando
40-41	Steve Englehart	Dan Jurgens	Bill Wray	Agustin Mas	Adrienne Roy
42-43	Joey Cavalieri	Joe Kubert	Josef Rubinstein	Andy Kubert	Adrienne Roy
44-45	Paul Kupperberg	David Ross	Howard Chaykin	Bob Lappan	Bob LeRose
46-47	Doug Moench	Jim Sherman	Greg Theakston & Alan Weiss	Todd Klein	Bob LeRose

== See also ==
- Heroes for Hope
- 9-11 (comics)
