= Diana Albers =

American comic book letterer

Diana Albers is an American comic book letterer. She is best known for lettering hundreds of books for Marvel Comics from the late-1970s to the mid-1990s. Comics she lettered include Iron Man #114 (Sept. 1978), Ghost Rider #45 (June 1980), Doctor Strange #46 (April 1981), Captain America #318 (June 1986), Alpha Flight #128 (Jan. 1994), and The Mighty Thor #482 (Jan. 1995).
