= Anne Sudworth =

British artist

The Goblin Tree, 109cm × 53cm, pastel on Ingres board, by Anne Sudworth

Anne Sudworth is a British artist known for her paintings of magical trees and moonlit landscapes.

== Career ==
=== Exhibitions ===
In 2001 there was an exhibition of her work in Cork Street, London at the Gallery 27. In 2002 she won a Chesley award for her painting "The Snow Tree". In 2004 there was an exhibition of her work in London at the A&D Gallery. Also in 2004 she was a featured artist guest and art show judge at DragonCon in Atlanta. In 2006 there was an exhibition of her pastels and charcoals at Cannizaro House in London. In May 2007 there was an exhibition of her work in London at the Square One Gallery. In Spring 2008 she was invited to exhibit at the Strawberry Hill House in London, home of Horace Walpole, who wrote the first Gothic novel "Castle of Otranto". In 2009 she exhibited at the Mall galleries, London and had a solo show at The Grey Chapel Art Gallery, Glastonbury. In 2010 her "Tiny Dreams" exhibition was held in Lancashire. In 2011 she was approached by English Heritage who now stock prints and cards of her work. In October 2012 there was an exhibition of her work at the SW1 Gallery in Mayfair, her ninth solo London show. She has also exhibited at a number of art fairs including the Art on Paper Fair, London.

=== Cover art and books ===
Sudworth has produced a small number of covers for Storm Constantine and Gwyneth Jones, as well as a number of other authors and musicians, including Oliver Wakeman. She has appeared in a number of books on both art and Goth including Mick Mercer's Goth Rock Books.

In 2000, the publisher Paper Tiger published a book on Sudworth's work called Enchanted World: The Art of Anne Sudworth. In March 2007 a new book on her work was published by AAPPL, called Gothic Fantasies: The Paintings of Anne Sudworth.
