= Bernie Wrightson's Frankenstein =

1983 comic book version of the 1818 novel Frankenstein

- Front cover

Publication information
- Publisher: Marvel Comics
- Publication date: 1983
- No. of issues: 1

Creative team
- Written by: Mary Shelley
- Artist: Bernie Wrightson

Bernie Wrightson's Frankenstein is an illustrated edition of Mary Shelley's novel Frankenstein; or, The Modern Prometheus with full-page illustrations by American artist Bernie Wrightson.

== Publication history ==
Wrightson used the revised 1831 text of the novel by Mary Shelley and spent seven years drawing over 60 detailed pen-and-ink illustrations. The illustrations themselves are not based upon the Boris Karloff or Christopher Lee movies or any other films, but on the actual book's descriptions of characters and objects. Wrightson also used a period style, saying "I wanted the book to look like an antique; to have the feeling of woodcuts or steel engravings, something of that era" and basing the feel on artists like Franklin Booth, J.C. Coll and Edwin Austin Abbey.

Wrightson has said that it was an unpaid project.

I've always had a thing for Frankenstein, and it was a labor of love. It was not an assignment, it was not a job. I would do the drawings in between paying gigs, when I had enough to be caught up with bills and groceries and what-not. I would take three days here, a week there, to work on the Frankenstein volume. It took about seven years.

To help fund this labor of love, Wrightson released three portfolios of his Frankenstein illustrations in 1977, 1978, and 1980 in advance of the publication of the full book in 1983. Each portfolio contained six 11x16 inch plates. The text accompanying the third portfolio said:

The book was originally conceived to contain 50 full-page illustrations, but to maintain a balance between the text & the images, the final selection had to be limited to 43.

Wrightson ultimately ended up with at least 63 finished drawings, of which he selected 45 for the publication: Two two-pages spreads on the endpapers, one title page and 42 illustrations throughout the text.

The book was first published in 1983 by Marvel Comics in a softcover edition and by Dodd, Mead & Co. as a hardcover. An introduction was provided by Stephen King.

In 1993, Apple Press published The Lost Frankenstein Pages, which includes 18 finished plates that were not used in the original book. It also collects a number of sketches and studies by Wrightson.

Bernie Wrightson's Frankenstein was reprinted several times. In 1994, Charles F. Miller published a new edition of the novel in soft- and hardcover. In 2008, for the 25th anniversary of the first edition, a new edition was released by Dark Horse Comics in an oversized (9" x 12"), hardcover format scanned from the original artwork, when it could be located. Simon & Schuster's Gallery Books imprint released a new version in 2020 in hardcover and a paperback in 2021. The size for both is a smaller 6"x9", reducing the detail in Wrightson's artwork.

== Frankenstein Alive, Alive! ==
In 2012, Wrightson and writer Steve Niles began publishing a comic book series titled Frankenstein Alive, Alive! which is billed as a "sequel to Wrightson's acclaimed 1983 illustrated version" by IDW Publishing. Wrightson won his first National Cartoonists Society's award in the category Comic Books for Frankenstein Alive, Alive! in 2013. The series was concluded in 2018 with artist Kelley Jones filling in for Wrightson who was unable to complete the series due to his health.

== Notable Editions ==
- Mary Wollstonecraft Shelley's Frankenstein (A Marvel Illustrated Novel). Marvel, New York NY, 1983. ISBN 978-0939766758
- Frankenstein. Dodd, Mead & Company, New York NY, 1983. ISBN 0396082785 (Hardcover, Limited Edition of 500, signed by Wrightson and Stephen King.)
- The Lost Frankenstein Pages. Apple Press, Greencastle PA, 1993. ISBN 978-0927203081
- Bernie Wrightson's Frankenstein. Underwood-Miller, Lancaster PA, 1994. ISBN 978-0887331947
- Frankenstein. Dark Horse, Milwaukie OR, 2008. ISBN 978-1595822000
- Frankenstein. Gallery 13 / Simon & Schuster, New York NY, 2021. ISBN 978-1982146160
- Frankenstein. Centipede Press, Lakewood CO, 2024. ISBN 978-1613473580 (Limited Edition of 750, oversized Hardcover (11" x 15½") in a cloth slipcase.)
- Frankenstein Alive, Alive: The Complete Collection. IDW Publishing, San Diego CA, 2018. ISBN 978-1684053377
