= Bernie Wrightson =

American comic artist (1948–2017)

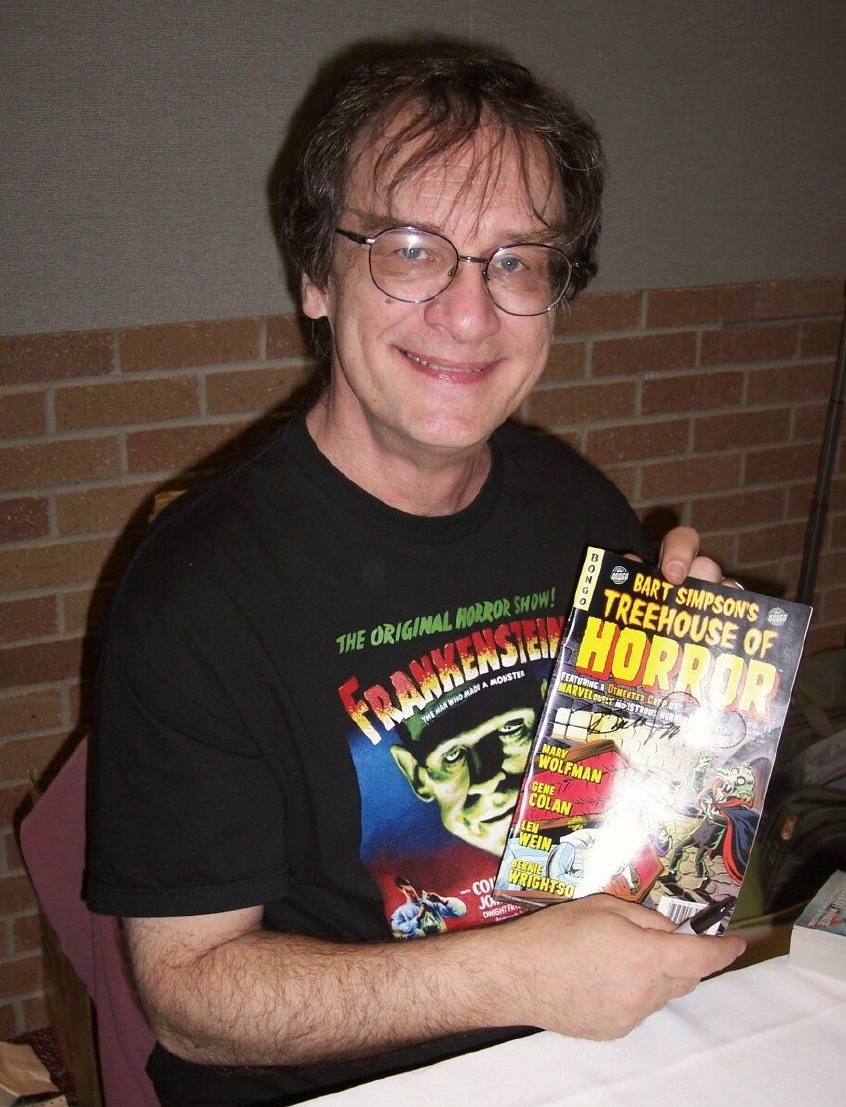
- Wrightson at the 2006 Dallas Comic Con
- Born: Bernard Albert Wrightson; October 27, 1948 Dundalk, Maryland, U.S.
- Died: March 18, 2017 (aged 68) Austin, Texas, U.S.
- Areas: Penciller, Artist, Inker
- Pseudonym: Berni Wrightson
- Notable works: Bernie Wrightson's Frankenstein; House of Mystery; House of Secrets; Swamp Thing
- Awards: Shazam Award 1972, 1973, 1974; Inkpot Award 1987; H.P. Lovecraft Award 2007; National Cartoonists Society Award 2012; Inkwell Awards Special Recognition Award 2015; Inkwell Awards Joe Sinnott Hall of Fame 2020
- Spouses: Michele Wrightson; Liz Wrightson

Bernard Albert Wrightson (October 27, 1948 – March 18, 2017) was an American artist, known for co-creating the Swamp Thing, his adaptation of the novel Frankenstein illustration work, and for his other horror comics and illustrations, which feature his trademark intricate pen and brushwork.

Wrightson began his career as an illustrator for The Baltimore Sun newspaper in 1966. In 1968, he was hired by DC Comics and was a regular artist on the House of Mystery and House of Secrets horror titles. Wrightson and writer Len Wein created Swamp Thing in House of Secrets #92 (July 1971). The character soon received its own monthly series, for which Wrightson drew the first ten issues.

In 1974, Wrightson began working for Warren Publishing magazines. Wrightson illustrated adaptions of works by well-known horror writers, including "The Black Cat" by Edgar Allan Poe and "Cool Air" by H. P. Lovecraft. He drew comic book adaptations of Stephen King's screenplay for Creepshow in 1982, which led to several more collaborations with King. Wrightson spent several years creating an illustrated edition of Mary Shelley's novel Frankenstein, which was released in 1983. Later in his career, Wrightson provided concept art for various films and television series.

== Early life ==
Wrightson was born October 27, 1948, in Dundalk, Maryland. He received training in art from watching Jon Gnagy on television, reading comics, particularly those of EC, as well as through a correspondence course from the Famous Artists School. His artistic influences were Frank Frazetta, Al Williamson, Al Dorne, Graham Ingels, Jack Davis and Howard Pyle. He published a piece of fan art, containing a headstone bearing the inscription "Berni Wrightson, Dec. 15, 1965", on page 33 of Warren Publishing's Creepy #9 (cover-dated June 1966).

== Career ==
In 1966, Wrightson began working for The Baltimore Sun newspaper as an illustrator. The following year, after meeting artist Frank Frazetta at a comic-book convention in New York City, he was inspired to produce his own stories. In 1968, he showed copies of his sequential art to DC Comics editor Dick Giordano and was given a freelance assignment. Wrightson began spelling his name "Berni" in his professional work to distinguish himself from an Olympic diver named Bernie Wrightson, but later restored the final "e" to his name.

In 1968, he drew his first professional comic book story, "The Man Who Murdered Himself", which appeared in House of Mystery #179 (cover-dated March–April 1969). He continued to work on a variety of mystery and anthology titles for both DC and, a few years later, its principal rival, Marvel Comics. It was for Marvel's Chamber of Darkness and Tower of Shadows titles where he was first encouraged to slightly simplify his intricate pen-and-ink drawing, and where his lush brushwork, a hallmark of his comics inking in the 1970s, was first evidenced.

Like many artists in the 1970s and 1980s, Wrightson moved to New York in hopes of finding work with comics publishers. At one point Wrightson lived in the same Queens apartment building as artists Allen Milgrom, Howard Chaykin and Walter Simonson. Simonson recalls, "We'd get together at 3 a.m. They'd come up and we'd have popcorn and sit around and talk about whatever a 26, 27 and 20-year-old guys talk about. Our art, TV, you name it. I pretty much knew at the time, 'These are the good ole days.'"

=== Swamp Thing ===
Swamp Thing #1 panel, original ink art by Wrightson

With writer Len Wein, Wrightson co-created the muck creature Swamp Thing in House of Secrets #92 (July 1971) in a standalone horror story set in the Victorian era. Wein later recounted how Wrightson became involved with the story: "Bernie Wrightson had just broken up with a girlfriend, and we were sitting in my car just talking about life – all the important things to do when you're 19 and 20 years old. [Laughs] And I said, 'You know, I just wrote a story that actually kind of feels like the way you feel now.' I told him about Swamp Thing, and he said, 'I gotta draw that.'"

In summer 1972, Wrightson published Badtime Stories, a horror/science fiction comics anthology featuring his own scripts and artwork (from the period 1970–1971), each story being drawn in a different medium, including ink wash, tonal pencil drawings, duoshade paper, and screen tones, along with traditional pen-and-ink and brushwork. He and writer Marv Wolfman co-created Destiny in Weird Mystery Tales #1 (July–Aug. 1972), a character which would later be used in the work of Neil Gaiman.

In the fall of 1972, the Swamp Thing returned in his own series, set in the contemporary world and in the general DC continuity. Wrightson drew the first ten issues of the series. Abigail Arcane, a major supporting character in the Swamp Thing mythos was introduced by Wrightson and Wein in issue #3 (Feb.-March 1973).

Wrightson had originally been asked by DC to handle the art for its revival of The Shadow, but he left the project early on when he realized he could not produce the necessary minimum number of pages on time, along with his work on Swamp Thing. Michael Kaluta illustrated the series, but Wrightson did contribute much to the third issue in both pencils and inks, as well as inking the splash page of issue #4.

=== Warren and The Studio ===
In the summer of 1973, Wrightson saw the Tod Browning horror film Freaks for the first time; in the years immediately afterward, the film influenced much of Wrightson's creative output.

In January 1974, Wrightson left DC to work at Warren Publishing, for whose black-and-white horror-comics magazines he produced a series of original work as well as short story adaptations. As with BadTime Stories, Wrightson experimented with different media in these black-and-white tales: Edgar Allan Poe's "The Black Cat" featured intricate pen-and-ink work which stood in direct contrast with his brush-dominated Swamp Thing panels. "Jenifer", scripted by Bruce Jones, was atmospherically rendered with gray markers. "The Pepper Lake Monster" was a synthesis of brush and pen-and-ink, whereas H.P. Lovecraft's "Cool Air" was a foray into duotone paper. "Nightfall" was an exercise in ink wash. "Clarice" was also drawn in pen, brush, and ink, and with ink wash.

In 1975, Wrightson joined with fellow artists Jeff Jones, Michael Kaluta, and Barry Windsor-Smith to form The Studio, a shared loft in Manhattan where the group would pursue creative products outside the constraints of comic book commercialism. Though he continued to produce sequential art, Wrightson at this time began producing artwork for numerous posters, prints, calendars, and even a highly detailed coloring book, The Monsters. He also drew sporadic comics stories and single illustrations for National Lampoon magazine from 1973 to 1983.

Wrightson spent seven years drawing approximately 50 detailed pen-and-ink illustrations to accompany an edition of Mary Shelley's novel Frankenstein. The illustrations themselves are not based upon the Boris Karloff or Christopher Lee films, but on the actual book's descriptions of characters and objects. Wrightson also used a period style, saying "I wanted the book to look like an antique; to have the feeling of woodcuts or steel engravings, something of that era" and basing the feel on artists like Franklin Booth, J.C. Coll and Edwin Austin Abbey. Frankenstein was an unpaid project, Wrightson describing it as a "labor of love" he worked on over seven years.

=== Later career ===
The "Captain Sternn" segment of the animated film Heavy Metal is based on a character created by Wrightson (first appearing in the June 1980 issue of Heavy Metal magazine). The Freakshow graphic novel, written by Bruce Jones and illustrated (via pen, brush, and ink with watercolors) by Wrightson, was published in Spain in 1982 and serialized in Heavy Metal magazine in the early 1980s.

In 1982 Bernie Wrightson illustrated the comic book adaptation of the Stephen King-penned horror film Creepshow. This led to several other collaborations with King, including illustrations for the novella "Cycle of the Werewolf", the restored edition of King's apocalyptic horror epic, The Stand, and Wolves of the Calla, the fifth installment of King's Dark Tower series. He would later illustrate the cover for TV Guide magazine's April 26 – May 2, 1997, issue, illustrating the TV miniseries of King's The Shining.

During production on the 1984 film Ghostbusters, Wrightson was among the artists hired by associate producer Michael C. Gross to provide concept art envisioning the ghosts and other psychic phenomena encountered by that film's characters. The artwork he contributed included images of the "escapees" from the Ghostbusters' electrically powered ghost storage facility, which run amok after the facility's electricity is turned off.

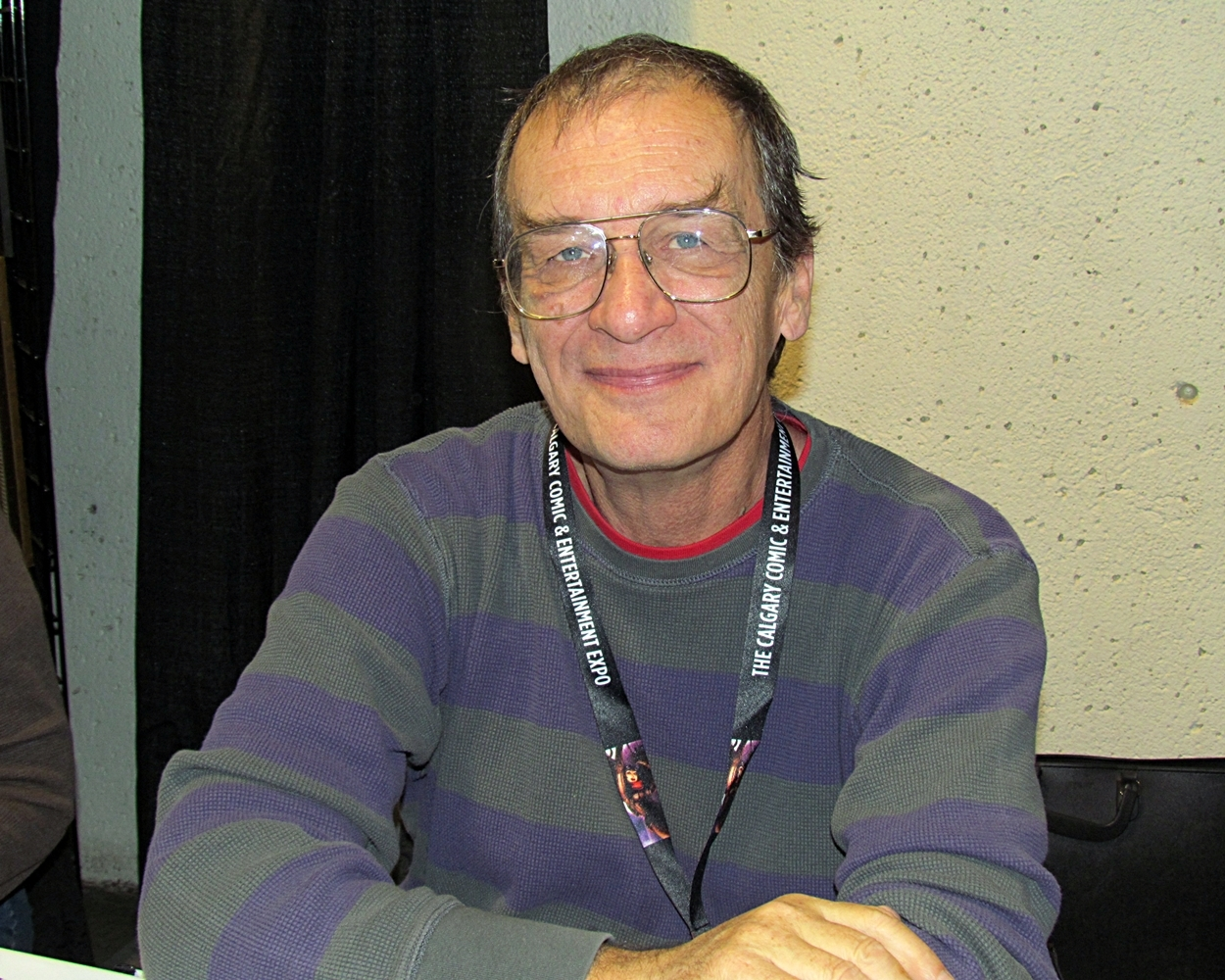
Wrightson in 2012

Jim Starlin and Wrightson produced Heroes for Hope, a 1985 one-shot designed to raise money for African famine relief and recovery. Published in the form of a "comic jam", the book featured an all-star lineup of comics creators as well as a few notable authors from outside the comic book industry, such as Stephen King, George R. R. Martin, Harlan Ellison, and Edward Bryant. In 1986, Wrightson and writer Susan K. Putney collaborated on the Spider-Man: Hooky graphic novel. That same year saw Wrightson and Starlin produce a second benefit comic, Heroes Against Hunger featuring Superman and Batman which was published by DC and like the earlier Marvel project featured many top comics creators. Starlin and Wrightson collaborated on two miniseries in 1988, The Weird and Batman: The Cult, as well as Marvel Graphic Novel #29 (featuring the Hulk and the Thing) and Punisher P.O.V. for Marvel.

Wrightson brought back his Captain Sternn character in 1993 for the Captain Sternn: Running Out of Time miniseries, published by Kitchen Sink Press. In 1997, Wrightson and Ron Marz collaborated on Batman/Aliens, a crossover between the Batman and Aliens franchises. Wrightson again worked with Punisher for the Punisher: Purgatory limited series from 1998 to 1999. The series was unusual for incorporating supernatural elements in a Punisher story.

He illustrated and contributed album covers for a number of bands and musical artists, including Meat Loaf. Wrightson did concept art for film and television, working on productions including The Faculty, Galaxy Quest, Spider-Man, The Mist, Land of the Dead, and Serenity. In 2012, Wrightson collaborated with Steve Niles on Frankenstein Alive, Alive! published by IDW Publishing, for which he won a National Cartoonists Society's award.

== Personal life ==
Wrightson's first wife Michele Wrightson was involved in underground comix, contributing stories to such publications as It Ain't Me, Babe, Wimmen's Comix, and Arcade. She died in 2015. Wrightson and Michelle had two sons together, John and Jeffrey. Wrightson lived with his second wife Liz Wrightson and his stepson Thomas Adamson in Austin, Texas.

Wrightson and his wife announced in January 2017 that he was retiring due to having limited body function after multiple brain surgeries. He died on March 18, 2017, at the age of 68. The next day, Liz Wrightson confirmed that his death followed a long diagnosis with brain cancer. "The First Day of the Rest of Your Life", the April 2, 2017, season 7 finale of the TV series The Walking Dead, was dedicated to Wrightson's memory.

== Creative legacy ==
Wrightson's death met with a series of testimonials and tributes by colleagues and professional admirers that included Joss Whedon, Neil Gaiman, Guillermo del Toro, Walter Simonson, and Mike Mignola. Whedon called Wrightson "a star by which other pencillers chart their course", while Gaiman stated that Wrightson was the first comics artist whose work he loved. Horror connoisseur del Toro took a 24-hour pledge of silence in honor of Wrightson, writing, "As it comes to all of us, the end came for the greatest that ever lived: Bernie Wrightson. My North dark star of youth. A master." Hellboy creator Mike Mignola said of Wrightson, "He was a genius, and not just a monster guy. Everything Bernie did had soul."

Wrightson's former neighbor Walter Simonson, who lived in the same building as Wrightson in the 1980s, recalled, "Even at an early age, we were all really in awe of his work, it was so good." Analyzing Wrightson's skill in depth, Simonson explained that in addition to his ability to draw anything, Wrightson was a master of value, able to effect a precise command over the depth and tones of the colors and shades of gray in his work, stating, "'Frankenstein' is a complete masterpiece of value, using incredibly complex pictures, and yet you always see exactly what you are supposed to see. He drives the eye right where it needs." Regarding the famously reproduced two-page spread from that work depicting Frankenstein's laboratory, Simonson said of that image, "It's so complicated and yet he's able to show you what he wants you to see. In some ways [the lab scene is] the core of the story. It's where Frankenstein breaks the laws of God." Comics analyst and historian Scott McCloud called that image a "riot of detail", saying, "It might take a moment before you even notice the corpse laying at the bottom of the composition on the left. That makes it a bit more of a treasure map. Bit more of a 'Where Is Waldo?'"

During a 2016 tour of his extensive library of art and pop culture memorabilia, Del Toro named Wrightson's Frankenstein as the work whose original artwork was the hardest to find, saying, "They are very rare. The people that have them don't let them go. It's taken me years to get that. I have nine out of the 13 favorite plates of the Frankenstein book that Bernie Wrightson ever did. The other four: one of them, no one knows where it is, and the other three are, I would say, very hard to pry away from the people that have them."

== Awards ==
- Wrightson won the Shazam Award for Best Penciller (Dramatic Division) in 1972 and 1973 for Swamp Thing, the Shazam Award for Best Individual Story (Dramatic) in 1972 for Swamp Thing #1 (with Len Wein). He received additional nominations, including for the Shazam Award for Best Inker in 1973 for Swamp Thing, as well as that year's Shazam for Best Individual Story, for "A Clockwork Horror" in Swamp Thing #6 (with Len Wein).
- Wrightson was a recipient of the 1974 Comic Fan Art Award for Favorite Pro Artist. He was a nominee for the same award, then known as the "Goethe Award," in 1973.
- Wrightson was co-recipient of the Bob Clampett Humanitarian Award for 1986, along with Jim Starlin, for his work on Heroes for Hope. The following year, Wrightson received an Inkpot Award.
- He was the Artist Guest of Honor at the 1998 World Horror Convention.
- Wrightson received the H.P. Lovecraft Award (also known as the "Howie") at the 2007 H.P. Lovecraft Film Festival in Portland, Oregon.
- He received the National Cartoonists Society's award in the category Comic Books for 2012 for Frankenstein Alive, Alive!
- He was awarded the Inkwell Award Special Recognition Award in 2015 for his 45-plus years of work, including co-creating DC Comic's Swamp Thing and Frankenstein. In 2021, Wrightson was inducted into the Inkwell Awards Joe Sinnott Hall of Fame.

== Bibliography ==
=== Comics ===
==== Bongo Comics ====
- Treehouse of Horror #11 segment "Squish Thing", a parody of Swamp Thing (2005)

==== Chanting Monks Studios ====
- Night Terrors #1 (2000)

==== Chaos! Comics ====
- Nightmare Theater #1–4 (1997)

==== Cry for Dawn Productions ====
- So Dark the Rose #1 (1995)

==== Dark Horse Comics ====
- City of Others #1–4 (2007)
- Tarzan Le Monstre #11–12 (1998)

==== DC Comics ====
- Aquaman Annual #4 (cover) (1998)
- Batman #265, 400 (interiors); #241, 320, Annual #22 (covers) (1972–1998)
- Batman: Hidden Treasures #1 (2010)
- Batman: Nevermore (covers) #1–5 (2003)
- Batman: The Cult #1–4 (1988)
- Detective Comics #425 (cover) (1972)
- Flinch #14 (2000)
- Green Lantern Annual #7 (cover) (1998)
- Heroes Against Hunger (two pages only) (1986)
- House of Mystery #179–181, 183, 186, 188, 191, 195, 204; (covers): #193–194, 207, 209, 211, 213–214, 217, 221, 229, 231, 236, 255–256 (1969–1978)
- House of Mystery vol. 2 #9; (cover): #1 (2009)
- House of Secrets #92; (covers): #93–94, 96, 100, 103, 106–107, 135, 139 (1971–1976)
- JLA Annual #2 (cover) (1998)
- Jonah Hex #9 (cover) (1978)
- Kong the Untamed #1–2 (covers) (1975)
- Plop! #1, 5 (1973–1974)
- Secrets of Haunted House #5, 44 (covers) (1975–1982)
- The Shadow Vol. 2 #3, (1974)
- Showcase (Nightmaster) #83–84 (1969)
- Spectre #9 (1969)
- Spectre vol. 3 #58 (cover) (1997)
- Superman/Batman Annual #3 (cover) (2009)
- Swamp Thing #1–10 (1972–1974)
- Tales of the Unexpected #4 (cover) (2007)
- The Unexpected #116, 119, 128 (1970–1971)
- Toe Tags Featuring George Romero (cover) #1–6 (2004–2005)
- Welcome Back to the House of Mystery #1 (cover) (1998)
- The Weird #1–4 (1988)
- Weird Mystery Tales #1 (interiors); #21 (cover) (1972–1975)
- Wonder Woman Annual #7 (cover) (1998)
- Witching Hour #3, 5 (1969)

==== DC Comics and Dark Horse Comics ====
- Batman/Aliens miniseries #1–2 (1997)

==== Eclipse Comics ====
- Berni Wrightson: Master of the Macabre #5 (1984)

==== Fantagraphics Books/Eros Comix ====
- Collected Purple Pictography #1 (1991)
- The Reaper of Love and Other Stories #1 (1988)

==== FPG ====
Bernie Wrightson: MASTER OF THE MACABRE (1993, Trading Card Series), MORE MACABRE (1994, Second Trading Card Series)

==== IDW Publishing ====
- Dead, She Said #1–3 (with Steve Niles) (2008)
- Frankenstein Alive, Alive! #1–3 (2012–2014)

==== Image Comics ====
- Frankenstein Mobster #7 (2004)
- The Walking Dead

==== Kitchen Sink Press ====
- Captain Sternn: Running Out of Time #1–5 (1993)

==== Major publications ====
- Web of Horror #1–3 (1969–1970)

==== Marvel Comics ====
- Astonishing Tales #31 (cover inks) (1975)
- Captain Marvel #41–42 (interiors); #43 (cover) (1975–1976)
- Chamber of Darkness #7 (interior); #8 (cover) (1970)
- Clive Barker's Hellraiser #1 (1989)
- Conan the Barbarian #12 (1971)
- Creatures on the Loose (King Kull) #10 (1971)
- Doctor Strange Special Edition #1 (cover) (1983)
- Dreadstar #6–7 (1983)
- Epic Illustrated #8, 10, 22, 25, 30, 34 (interiors); #30 (cover) (1981–1986)
- Frankenstein Monster #18 (cover)
- Gargoyle #1 (cover) (1985)
- Giant-Size Chillers #3 (cover) (1975)
- Heroes for Hope starring the X-Men #1 (three pages only) (1985)
- The Incredible Hulk #197 (cover) (1976)
- Marvel Graphic Novel #22 (Spider-Man: "Hooky"); #29 (The Hulk and the Thing: "The Big Change") (1986–1987)
- Punisher P.O.V. #1–4 (1991)
- Punisher: Purgatory #1–4 (1998–1999)
- Savage Tales (King Kull) #2 (1973)
- Shadows & Light #1 (1998)
- Sub-Mariner #36 (inker) (1971)
- The Tomb of Dracula #43 (cover) (1976)
- Tower of Shadows #8–9 (covers) (1971)
- Werewolf by Night #35 (cover) (1976)

==== New American Library ====
- Creepshow trade paperback (1982)

==== Pacific Comics ====
- Berni Wrightson: Master of the Macabre #1–4 (1983–1984)
- Twisted Tales #2 (1983)

=== Magazines ===
==== As You Like It Publications ====
- Comic Book Profiles #2 (1998)

==== Gemstone Publishing ====
- Comic Book Marketplace #105 (2003)

==== Metal Mammoth, Inc. ====
- Heavy Metal Special Editions vol. 10, #1 (1996)

==== NL Communications, Inc. ====
- The National Lampoon Encyclopedia of Humor (1973)
- National Lampoon's Very Large Book Of Comical Funnies (1975)

==== Skywald Publications ====
- Nightmare #9–10 (1972)

==== TwoMorrows Publishing ====
- Alter Ego vol. 3, #41 (2004)
- Back Issue! #6 (2004)
- Comic Book Artist #4 (1999)

==== Warren Publishing ====
- Creepy #62–63, 77, 87, 95 (1974–1978), 83, 86 (inks over Carmine Infantino)
- Eerie #58, 60, 62, 68, 72 (w/ Chaykin) (1974–1976)
- Vampirella (backup stories) #33 (with Jeffrey Catherine Jones), 34 (script only)

=== Book illustrations ===
- The Art of Wrightson : A Pop-Up Portfolio, 1996, Sideshow, Incorporated, ISBN 1889164003
- Badtime Stories, 1972, Graphic Masters
- The Berni Wrightson Treasury, 1975, Omnibus Publishing
- Bernie Wrightson's Frankenstein, 1983, Dodd, Mead & Company, ISBN 0396082777
- Berni Wrightson: A Look Back, 1991, Underwood Books, ISBN 0887331300
- Berni Wrightson: Back for More, 1978, Archival Press, Inc., ISBN 091582230X
- The Conan Grimoire, by L. Sprague de Camp, 1972, Mirage Press
- The Conan Reader, by L. Sprague de Camp, 1968, Mirage Press
- Creepshow by Stephen King, 1982, NAL
- Cycle of the Werewolf, by Stephen King, 1985, NAL, ISBN 0451822196
- The Dark Tower V: Wolves of the Calla, by Stephen King, 2006, Pocket Books, ISBN 141651693X
- The House of Mystery by Jack Oleck, 1973, Warner Books
- The Lost Frankenstein Pages, 1993, Apple Pr Inc., ISBN 0927203081
- The Monsters Color the Creature Book, 1974, Phil Seuling
- The Mutants, 1980, Mother of Pearl, ISBN 093784800X
- The Reaper of Love and Other Stories, 1988, Fantagraphics Books, ISBN 093019361X
- The Stand-Complete and Uncut by Stephen King, 1990, Dbldy; BOMC edition
- The Studio (includes work by other artists), 1979, Dragons Dream, ISBN 9063325819
- Stuff Out'a My Head, by Joseph M. Monks, 2002, Chanting Monks Press, ISBN 0972660402
- Zombie Jam, by David J. Schow, 2005, Subterranean Press, ISBN 1931081778
- Ghostbusters: The Ultimate Visual History by Daniel Wallace, 2015, Insight Editions. San Rafael, California. pp. 21 and 86. ISBN 978-1608875108

=== Album artwork ===
- Meat Loaf: Dead Ringer, 1981, Epic Records
- Obituary: Back from the Dead, 1997, Roadrunner Records
