= Paper Tiger Books =

Former British publishing house

- Parent company: Anova Books
- Status: Defunct (2009)
- Founded: 1976
- Founder: Hubert Schaafsma, Martyn and Roger Dean
- Country of origin: United Kingdom
- Key people: Hubert Schaafsma; Nigel Suckling
- Publication types: Art books
- Imprints: Dragon's Dream; Dragon's World

Paper Tiger Books was a British publishing house which focused primarily on books of modern art, specifically the visionary, the fantastic, and science fiction, and an imprint of Dragons World Ltd. It was started in 1976 by Hubert Schaafsma and brothers Martyn and Roger Dean after the success of Roger Dean's book Views through a sister imprint, Dragon's Dream.

Artists published by Paper Tiger include Chris Achilleos, Stephen Bradbury, Bob Eggleton, John Harris, Peter Andrew Jones, Josh Kirby, Rodney Matthews, Chris Moore, Bruce Pennington, Barclay Shaw, Anne Sudworth, Jim Warren, David A. Hardy, and Patrick Woodroffe; as well as numerous titles by Boris Vallejo and Julie Bell.

== History ==
Initially formed to publish The Album Cover Album, Paper Tiger's range quickly expanded to include art which was not only connected to music, but also the visionary, the fantastic, and the best of science fiction. The staff within the company, apart from Hubert Schaafsma, Martyn and Roger Dean, included Dominy Hamilton (daughter of Richard Hamilton), Jim Slattery, Christine Miles, Shelley Alge, and Steve Henderson.

Through its imprint Dragon's World, the company published the 1978 book The Round Art: The Astrology of Time and Space, by the astrologer and artist A. T. Mann.

Hubert Schaafsma bought out the Dean brothers in 1981, who left the company, and it continued under the management of Schaafsma, producing a series of fantasy art books, many of which were edited by Nigel Suckling, who also provided text to accompany the pictures. Under Schaafsma's leadership, the Dragon's World company expanded into the imprints of Dragon's World Children's Books, Dragon's World Natural History Books, and Dragon's World Books—the latter being general visual interest books. The Paper Tiger imprint dealing with fantasy/visionary/science fiction and music was expanded to publish over 250 titles in 12 languages throughout the world.

From July 1999 through October 2001, Paper Tiger issued a monthly ezine called The Paper Snarl, which featured interviews with its artists.

In 1997, Paper Tiger was "rescued" by Collins & Brown, before becoming an imprint of Anova Books. As of late 2009, the imprint appears to be defunct.
