= The Transformers (Marvel Comics) =

Comic book series

- Cover to The Transformers #2 (November 1984), art by Michael Golden

Publication information
- Publisher: Marvel Comics
- Schedule: Monthly
- Format: Ongoing series
- Publication date: September 1984 – July 1991
- No. of issues: 80
- Main character(s): Autobots, Decepticons

Creative team
- Created by: Marvel Comics
- Written by: Bob Budiansky (issues 5–15, 17–42, and 44–55); Simon Furman (issues 56–80); Len Kaminski (issue 16); Ralph Macchio (issues 1 [plotted by Bill Mantlo] and 43); Jim Salicrup (issues 2 [plotted by Bill Mantlo], 3, and 4)
- Artist(s): Alan Kupperberg (issues 5 and 6); Geoff Senior (issues 61, 62, 65, 66, and 75); Dwayne Turner (issue 68)
- Penciller(s): Bob Budiansky (issue 55 [co-penciler]); José Delbo (issues 37–42, 45–54, 56–60, 63, 64, and 67); Jim Fern (issue 55 [co-penciler]); William Johnson (issues 7 and 8); Mike Manley (issue 9); Don Perlin (issues 13–15, 17–19, 21–32, and 35); Frank Springer (issues 1–4, and 44); Herb Trimpe (issues 11, 12, and 20); Ricardo Villamonte (issue 10); Andrew Wildman (issues 69–74 and 76–80)
- Inker(s): Ian Akin (issues [co-inker] 4, 19–25, 27–30, 32, and 35–37); Kyle Baker (issues 7 and 8); Stephen Baskerville (issues 70–74 and 76–80); Danny Bulanadi (issues 41, 44, 46, 48, 49, 54, and 67); Vince Colletta (issue 18); Kim DeMulder (issues 1–3); Mike Esposito (issue 3); Jim Fern (issue 31); Brian Garvey (issues [co-inker] 4, 19–25, 27–30, 32, and 35–37); Al Gordon (issues 12–14); Mike Gustovich (issue 55); Don Hudson (comics) (issue 42); Dave Hunt (issues 38–40, 42, 45, 47, 50–53, 56–60, and 63); Brad Joyce (issue 10); Tom Palmer (issue 11); Dan Reed (issue 64); Keith Williams (issues 15–18); Al Williamson (issue 64)
- Colorist: Nel Yomtov (issues 1–80)

The Transformers is an 80-issue American comic book series published by Marvel Comics telling the story of the Transformers. Originally scheduled as a four-issue miniseries, it spawned a mythology that would inform other versions of the saga.

== US title ==
=== Issues ===
No.	Title	Release date	ISBN
01	The Transformers	May 8, 1984	—
On the mechanical world of Cybertron, inhabited by gigantic transforming robots, a fierce civil war rages between the heroic Autobots and the evil Decepticons, respectively led by Optimus Prime and Megatron. Cybertron's orbit is disrupted by the war, and the Autobots eventually detect an asteroid belt that threatens to destroy their home. The Autobots build a spacecraft, the Ark, to clear the asteroids, but the Decepticons learn of the plan and force their way aboard the ship. With no other choice, Optimus crashes the Ark on a nearby planet and into a volcano, knocking all aboard offline. Four million years later, the volcano erupts and reactivates the Ark’s computer, which mistakes humanity's vehicles as the planet's dominant lifeforms and rebuilds the Autobots and Decepticons into Earth-based bodies. The Decepticons leave to search for energy while the Autobots start repairing the Ark; meanwhile, in the nearby city of Portland, the young human student Buster Witwicky heads to a drive-in movie theater with his friends. The Autobots investigate the drive-in and accidentally attract the Decepticons, who attack and injure Bumblebee, and both sides quickly realize that humans, not their vehicles, are Earth's dominant lifeform. A confused Buster drives the damaged Bumblebee back to his house, where he and his mechanic father Sparkplug are shocked to hear the seemingly normal car ask for help.
02	Power Play!	July 10, 1984	—
As the Decepticons attack a nuclear plant for energy, Bumblebee is repaired by Buster and Sparkplug and asks them to help the Autobots acquire fuel. Bumblebee explains his kind's history to Buster and his friends as the Decepticon spy Ravage listens in. At the Ark, the Autobots detect Bumblebee's distress signal and meet him at the Witwicky garage, where Sparkplug agrees to help Optimus convert human fuels into usable Cybertronian alternatives. However, the Decepticons attack and give Starscream the opportunity to kidnap Sparkplug, while the fuel-depleted Autobots are unable to pursue their enemies.
03	Prisoner of War!	September 11, 1984	—
Under duress from Megatron, Sparkplug agrees to help the Decepticons manufacture fuel out of human resources. The Autobots and Buster return to the Ark to plan a rescue, while the Decepticons begin stealing components necessary for Sparkplug's fuel conversion and attract worldwide attention. Among the reporters and military officials gathering outside the Decepticon base is photojournalist Peter Parker, who changes into his superhero alter ego Spider-Man as the Decepticons force the military to retreat. During the chaos, Spider-Man meets the Autobot Gears, and the two agree to infiltrate the fortress together and rescue Sparkplug while the other Autobots distract the Decepticons. They successfully retrieve Sparkplug and the Autobots return to base; Gears is repaired by Ratchet and informs the others that the Decepticons successfully completed the fuel conversion process thanks to Sparkplug.
04	The Last Stand	November 13, 1984	—
Several of the Autobots lash out at Sparkplug after learning he helped the Decepticons, and he tries to escape the Ark with Buster but suffers a heart attack. As Ratchet takes the two humans to the hospital, Huffer informs Optimus of a discovery he made within the ship's memory banks: shortly after the Ark crashed, the Decepticon Shockwave arrived on prehistoric Earth in pursuit. The ship's computer reactivated five Autobot warriors and modified their bodies to transform into dinosaurs, creating the Dinobots, who confronted Shockwave in the Savage Land. As contact with the Dinobots was lost immediately afterward, a probe is dispatched to search for the missing warriors as the other Autobots give their remaining fuel to Optimus, Huffer, Bluestreak, Ironhide, and Mirage. The Decepticons arrive at the Ark to destroy the Autobots, but they quickly collapse in agony as a hospitalized Sparkplug informs Buster that he had poisoned their new fuel source. Before the Autobots can celebrate their victory, however, they are all dispatched by Shockwave, whom the probe had accidentally reawakened.
05	The New Order	February 26, 1985	—
Shockwave has strung the defeated and disassembled Autobots from the Ark’s ceiling and plots to conquer the planet, unopposed by either Autobot or Decepticon. As the poisoned Decepticons recuperate, Shockwave informs Megatron that the Decepticons are now under his command and his ultimate objective is to build a new army for himself using the Creation Matrix within Optimus Prime's chest. Shockwave departs while Ratchet and Buster return to the Ark and find the Decepticons have taken over. Buster sneaks inside and discovers the disassembled Autobots and Optimus' disembodied head, who informs Buster that he is their last hope.
06	The Worse of Two Evils!	March 26, 1985	—
Shockwave singlehandedly conquers a high-tech oil rig owned by industrialist G.B. Blackrock, severely injuring its principal electronics designer Josie Beller, while Buster is electrocuted attempting to repair Optimus and returns to Ratchet outside. A furious Megatron breaks free from his repair systems and attacks Shockwave when he claims control of the Decepticons, but Shockwave quickly defeats him in his weakened state. Ratchet and Buster hide outside the Ark and watch in horror as Shockwave throws Megatron's broken body in front of the other Decepticons and forces them to swear loyalty to him.
07	Warrior School!	April 23, 1985	—
Buster begins suffering severe head pains after his experience with Optimus and is returned home by a group of human campers while Ratchet sneaks inside the Ark. Decepticon spymaster Soundwave conquers a Blackrock Enterprises-owned aerospace plant, also designed by the now-hospitalized Josie Beller, as Optimus' head encourages the reluctant Ratchet to fight and defeat Megatron. Under intense pressure to maintain Sparkplug's car repair business while he recuperates from his heart attack, Buster snaps at his friends and experiences another bout of head pain that causes several nearby objects to levitate. Ratchet is quickly defeated by Megatron but soon discovers he has lost command of the Decepticons and proposes a deal with him: if Ratchet can defeat Shockwave, Megatron must abandon the Ark and the defeated Autobots, but if not, then Megatron can destroy him. Understanding that he benefits either way, Megatron agrees to Ratchet's deal.
08	Repeat Performance!	May 28, 1985	—
Ratchet travels to the Savage Land to find the Dinobots and soon excavates the entombed Slag, who recognizes a fellow Autobot and quickly agrees to help destroy Shockwave. Megatron reluctantly brings Optimus' head to the Blackrock aerospace plant on Shockwave's orders, who prepares to build a new generation of Decepticons using the Autobot leader's Creation Matrix. Megatron attempts to double-cross Ratchet but is instead ambushed by the Dinobots and sent careening over the edge of a cliff. Meanwhile, Josie Beller destroys her hospital television with strange circuit-like strips printed onto her arm.
09	DIS-Integrated Circuits!	June 25, 1985	—
G.B. Blackrock unveils a new secret weapon designed to destroy Cybertronians to military officials and confronts Josie Beller, who escaped from her hospital room and constructed a metal suit for her damaged nervous system that can attack any mechanical object, now calling herself Circuit Breaker. The Autobots are restored under Prowl's leadership, and Jazz and Wheeljack convince Blackrock to accept their protection from the Decepticons in exchange for fuel. As Starscream plots mutiny while he and Frenzy are sent to destroy Blackrock's new weapon, Buster inexplicably gains the knowledge on how to fix a customer's engine block. Blackrock's public unveiling is sabotaged by Circuit Breaker, who intends to supersede his secret weapon as an anti-Cybertronian weapon herself, but the Decepticons attack the presentation. Circuit Breaker manages to drive them away with help from Jazz and Wheeljack but severely injures the two Autobots, and she cuts ties with Blackrock before fleeing.
10	The Next Best Thing to Being There!	July 23, 1985	—
The first six Decepticons of Shockwave's new army, the Constructicons, are sent with Soundwave to build a communications array powerful enough to contact Cybertron. Blackrock offers the Autobots a way to spy on the Decepticons through bugged telephone wires, but Bumblebee interrupts the conversation to report that the Constructicons have left the aerospace plant. Prowl sends reinforcements to intercept the Constructicons as Sparkplug returns home to discover Buster's inexplicable new affinity for mechanics; neither realizes that the true reason behind the young human's strange new abilities is because Optimus secretly transferred the Creation Matrix into Buster's mind to keep it safe from Shockwave. The Autobots find the Decepticons and the communications array thanks to a human trucker but are caught unawares by the Constructicons' ability to combine into the gigantic behemoth Devastator. Soundwave takes advantage of Huffer's hesitation to destroy the array and sends a signal to Cybertron, but the trucker destroys the machine before the message can be fully sent. At the aerospace plant, Shockwave realizes that Optimus no longer has the Matrix when he fails to bring the Decepticon jet Jetfire to life, and he decides to kill him as the other Autobots listen in from the Ark.
11	Brainstorm!	August 27, 1985	—
Still confused by his new powers, Buster resolves to keep them a secret from Sparkplug and makes amends with his friends. Shockwave discovers that Buster infiltrated the Ark by reviewing Rumble's memories and determines that Optimus must have transferred the Matrix to him. However, he is unaware the Autobots also overheard his deduction, and Bumblebee and Bluestreak are sent to protect Buster. They trick a resentful Sparkplug into leading them to Buster, but the Decepticon spy Laserbeak transmits their location to Shockwave, who programs the non-sentient Jetfire to retrieve the boy. Bumblebee and Sparkplug convince Buster to use his powers to disassemble Jetfire, who then repairs and reprograms him to help the Autobots rescue Optimus from Shockwave.
12	Prime Time!	September 24, 1985	—
Buster orders Jetfire to take him to the Blackrock aerospace plant, but they are intercepted by military fighters and Buster loses consciousness during Jetfire's evasive maneuvers. Without the Creation Matrix's influence, Jetfire reverts to his original programming and delivers Buster to Shockwave. An Autobot team brings Optimus' headless body to the aerospace plant, unaware that Soundwave discovered Blackrock's listening device, and Shockwave lures them into a trap by commanding Jetfire to dispose of Optimus' head in a nearby swamp. Unaware that the head is a Decepticon-controlled fake, the Autobots save it and reattach it to Optimus' body, which then attacks and cuts down many of the unsuspecting Autobots alongside Soundwave and his minions. Buster awakens, retakes command of Jetfire, and orders him to dispatch Shockwave and bring Optimus' real head to the swamp, who takes remote control of his body and replaces the fake head with his own. Now fully restored, Optimus defeats Soundwave and Shockwave, leaving the latter to sink into the depths of the swamp in favor of saving Buster. Optimus transfers the Creation Matrix back into himself and worries that further human lives will be endangered because of the Autobots and Decepticons.
13	Shooting Star	October 22, 1985	—
While fleeing from two hulking thugs, small-time crook Joey Slick finds a strange gun that responds to the thugs' sarcastic taunts and instantly kills them. Joey soon discovers that the gun is Megatron, whose higher brain functions were disconnected during his battle with Ratchet and the Dinobots and obeys Joey's every command without question. Joey uses Megatron's incredible firepower to wage a one-man crime spree and quickly amasses vast power and wealth, but soon realizes he does not want to be revered and feared as he is now. No longer scared of others, Joey blasts his way into the compound of crime lord Jake Lomax, who originally sent the thugs after him for an unpaid debt, and punches the mobster out. In doing so, he accidentally restores Megatron but stands unafraid before the furious Decepticon; impressed with the tiny human's bravery, Megatron spares him and leaves to rejoin the Decepticons as Joey turns himself over to the police.
14	Rock and Roll-Out!	November 26, 1985	—
Optimus brings Jetfire fully to life and inducts him into the Autobots. As Ratchet struggles to repair the large group of Autobots damaged in the assault on the Blackrock aerospace plant, Optimus reactivates the minds of five more Autobots stored within the Ark – Grapple, Hoist, Skids, Smokescreen, and Tracks, – and has Wheeljack implant them into new Earth bodies. Optimus requests Grapple's help on a secret project as Bumblebee leads the other new Autobots on a drive around their new home. Meanwhile, Starscream, Skywarp, and Thundercracker are trapped on Blackrock's oil rig by a human naval fleet but are unexpectedly rescued by Shockwave, who demonstrates a new power siphon that can convert any form of energy into Cybertronian energon cubes. Blackrock relays this new information to the Autobots as the Decepticons escape, and Skids realizes they are planning to attack an upcoming concert to steal its sonic energy. Blackrock is summoned to the White House to help create a cover story for the existence of giant alien robots and prevent public hysteria while Bumblebee and the new Autobots attack the Decepticons at the concert. The Autobots stop Shockwave from stealing the concert's energy and incinerating the audience, and Optimus commends them for doing the right thing despite disobeying orders.
15	I, Robot-Master!	December 31, 1985	—
Megatron runs out of fuel and deactivates inside a coal mine, which unwittingly forces the government agents tasked with covering up the existence of the Cybertronians to accelerate their timetables. One of the agents, Walter Barnett, is inspired by his son's comic book to invent a fictitious supervillain named the "Robot-Master" as the secret mastermind behind the giant robots. Barnett convinces the comic book's original author Donny Finkleberg, recently laid off from his job at Marvel Comics, to play the role of the Robot-Master on live TV, which greatly confuses the Autobots and alerts Soundwave to the unconscious Megatron's location. Inspired by the Robot-Master broadcasts, the military attacks the Autobots, inadvertently giving Soundwave and his minions the opportunity to restore Megatron. Finkleberg is nearly executed by Megatron in the resulting battle, but he convinces the Decepticons to spare him in exchange for further Robot-Master broadcasts denouncing the Autobots. Although Megatron is reluctant to even pretend to submit to a human's control, Soundwave pressures him into agreeing.
16	Plight of the Bumblebee!	January 1986	—
Starscream, Skywarp, and Buzzsaw are sent by Shockwave to capture Bumblebee so he can test an electro-calcinator module on him capable of controlling his movements. Feeling useless following their previous battle and believing the Autobots would be better off without him, Bumblebee leaves the Ark and is quickly ambushed and damaged by Shockwave's Decepticons. He manages to evade them by hiding inside an auto dealership, but two teenagers break in later that night and steal Bumblebee, inadvertently overriding his motor functions and allowing the Decepticons to track him again. The teens enter Bumblebee into a street race and repair his damaged engine, but the Decepticons attack and incite a high-speed chase between themselves, Bumblebee, and the military. Just as Bumblebee prepares to make a last stand to defend himself and the teens, the Autobots arrive and force the Decepticons to retreat, convincing Bumblebee that they do care about him.
17	The Smelting Pool!	February 1986	—
Within the war-torn ruins of Cybertron, controlled by ruthless Decepticon warlords, the Autobot spy Scrounge infiltrates the Decepticon fortress Darkmount to retrieve a kidnapped Neutral engineer named Spanner. Instead, Scrounge discovers that the Decepticons recently received a coded interstellar transmission of extreme importance and abducted Spanner to translate it. He attempts to copy the message and escape but is captured by Shrapnel before he can pass it to his partner Blaster. Scrounge is brought before Darkmount's Lord High Governor Straxus for interrogation while Blaster convinces the other Autobots in his resistance cell, led by Perceptor, to mount a rescue mission. Blaster breaks into Darkmount alone and allows himself to be captured, and Straxus orders Blaster to be dumped into the smelting pool. As Blaster finds the half-melted Scrounge and reluctantly sacrifices his friend for the coded message, the other Autobots arrive and help Blaster escape. They decode the message and learn that Optimus Prime and a small contingent of Autobots are alive on an alien world called Earth, filling the team with newfound hope.
18	The Bridge to Nowhere!	March 1986	—
A young human couple witnesses half of a strange suspension bridge materialize out of thin air, which produces a giant metal creature that promptly explodes before both vanish as quickly as they arrived. The humans flee, unaware that they witnessed the failed test of a Decepticon space bridge designed by Spanner capable of traveling between Earth and Cybertron. A furious Straxus orders the space bridge shut down for repairs, giving Blaster and the other Autobots in Perceptor's resistance cell the opportunity to attack the bridge. At the Decepticon-held coal mine, Megatron's irritation over the imprisoned Donny Finkleberg's complaints is interrupted when Starscream, Thundercracker, and Skywarp return with Shockwave. The two would-be commanders prepare to duel for leadership again, but a transmission from Straxus regarding the space bridge's forthcoming activation forces them to put aside their enmity of one another and accept joint command of the Decepticons for now. Perceptor's Autobots attack Darkmount and give Blaster the opportunity to wire the space bridge to explode, but he hesitates after discovering the Decepticons mutilated Spanner and incorporated his broken body into the machine. The space bridge is activated and Blaster tricks Straxus into rupturing the main fuel line, destroying both him and the space bridge and stranding Perceptor's remaining Autobots on Earth.
19	Command Performances!	April 1986	—
Optimus presents the results of Grapple's secret project to the assembled Autobot forces: a titanic warrior named Omega Supreme, brought to life by the Creation Matrix and tasked with guarding the Ark. As the Autobots attack the Decepticon base, Megatron leads Starscream, Skywarp, Thundercracker, Laserbeak, Rumble, Buzzsaw, and Frenzy in a counterattack on the Ark after assuming the Autobot attack depleted the base's personnel. However, they are soundly defeated by Omega Supreme, and only Megatron and Laserbeak escape with their lives. Shockwave orders the Constructicons to combine into Devastator as the Autobots retreat and Finkleberg mounts an escape attempt, but Skids is knocked into a gorge and seemingly killed. Megatron and Shockwave berate each other for their respective failures, and Shockwave reluctantly cedes command of the Decepticons back to Megatron upon being convinced that his defeat was more significant than the latter's failed attack on the Ark.
20	Showdown!	May 1986	—
Ravage pursues the recently escaped Finkleberg, who manages to evade the Decepticon spy long enough to find the Autobots and warn them of the space bridge's activation. A human cowgirl named Charlene finds Skids' wrecked form and convinces her coworker Wendell to repair him. Skids is forced to reveal his Cybertronian nature to Charlene to escape an angry motorist, and she agrees to keep him as her car after learning he no longer wishes to fight in the Autobot-Decepticon war. The two bond over the next few days as they explore the natural beauty of Earth together, but Finkleberg recognizes Skids as an Autobot and accidentally leads Ravage to their location. Skids manages to escape with Charlene and Finkleberg to a deserted mine but is knocked unconscious by the angry motorist, who later attacks Ravage and gives Skids enough time to recover and throw Ravage down a mineshaft. His faith in the Autobot cause restored, Skids reluctantly says goodbye to Charlene and returns to the Ark with Finkleberg.
21	Aerialbots over America!	June 1986	—
The Decepticons on Cybertron repair the space bridge and send the Insecticons to reinforce Megatron, who rebuilds them with native alternate modes. Bombshell takes mental control of a human engineer working at the Hoover Dam power plant, who smuggles Megatron inside and takes the plant's workers hostages. Skids and Finkleberg report the appearance of more Autobots via the space bridge at the Ark, and Optimus tasks Jetfire with verifying Finkleberg's claims before sending Wheeljack's newest creations, the Aerialbots, to the power plant. The Decepticons reopen the space bridge at the power plant and send Ramjet, Thrust, and Dirge over with a massive drill and pipeline to transfer the plant's energy back to Cybertron. The Aerialbots arrive and combine into the gigantic Autobot Superion, who destroys the drill but nearly kills the mind-controlled engineer wielding Megatron's gun form. The engineer's young daughter gives him the strength to resist Bombshell's control and shut down the space bridge. The Aerialbots decombine and retreat, unaware that Bombshell hitched a ride on Silverbolt's wing, as Jetfire finds evidence that more Autobots are indeed on Earth. However, both he and Finkleberg fail to realize that the new arrivals have been captured and disassembled by a secret anti-Cybertronian government task force known as RAAT and their leader, Circuit Breaker.
22	Heavy Traffic!	July 1986	—
At RAAT headquarters, a concerned Walter Barnett debriefs Circuit Breaker regarding the force used on the captured Autobots as Bombshell infiltrates the Ark. He attempts to mentally control Optimus Prime but can only read the Autobot leader's thoughts, allowing the Decepticons to eavesdrop on Skids and Finkleberg's assignment to find the missing Autobots. Megatron siphons off some of the Creation Matrix's energy from Optimus via Bombshell and uses it to bring the Stunticons to life. Skids and Finkleberg attract the attention of RAAT and Circuit Breaker, who disregards Barnett's suspicions that not all the giant robots are evil and leaves to capture them. RAAT forces eventually track down Skids, Finkleberg, and the recently-arrived Aerialbots, but the Stunticons arrive and trick them into attacking. The Aerialbots merge into Superion and the Stunticons combine into the giant Menasor in response; as the two titans fight, Skids and Finkleberg escape as Circuit Breaker incapacitates Superion and is saved from Menasor by Barnett. Later that night, Finkleberg secretly calls Barnett and offers to betray Skids in exchange for money.
23	Decepticon Graffiti!	August 1986	—
Skids is taken captive by RAAT and dissected by Circuit Breaker as Megatron summons the Battlechargers, Runabout and Runamuck, from Cybertron to challenge Optimus to a duel to the death for him. The Battlechargers are unimpressed with Megatron's leadership and decide instead to spray graffiti on national monuments across the United States. RAAT takes notice and eventually catches the two Decepticons at Independence Hall, but Circuit Breaker is injured while saving a young human from the crossfire. Finkleberg suggests she reactivate the captured Autobots as the Battlechargers vandalize the Statue of Liberty, but RAAT is unable to repair the Autobots in time, so Circuit Breaker combines their parts into a giant power suit to destroy the Battlechargers. As part of their agreement, Circuit Breaker repairs and releases all the Autobots, and she and Finkleberg are fired from RAAT for their insubordination.
24	Afterdeath!	September 1986	—
Megatron leads the Combaticons to steal a hydrothermocline device capable of drawing endless amounts of energy from the ocean's thermal layers, and the Decepticons are met by Optimus and the Protectobots. To avoid destroying the hydrothermocline, Optimus and Megatron agree to fight inside a highly advanced computer-generated video game, with the victor winning both the hydrothermocline and the life of the losing leader. The Protectobots gain the trust and assistance of the video game's characters and defeat the Combaticons, then combine into Defensor and help Optimus destroy Megatron. However, Megatron secretly cheats and uses a back-door password to respawn and ambush Optimus, who is forced to kill the video game characters to stop him again. Although he technically won, Optimus convinces Ethan Zachary, the game's programmer, to kill him as punishment for cheating (unaware that Megatron also cheated). The Decepticons leave with the hydrothermocline device and the Protectobots return Optimus' body to the Ark, with both parties unaware that Ethan saved a copy of Optimus' mind on a floppy disk.
25	Gone but Not Forgotten!	October 1986	—
As the Decepticons prepare to relocate to a new undersea base to take advantage of the hydrothermocline's power and avoid a military strike, Megatron remains unconvinced that Optimus is actually dead and descends into madness. Shockwave and Soundwave task the Predacons with assassinating him, but Megatron is able to defeat both the five individual Predacons and their combined form, Predaking. Megatron accuses Shockwave of plotting to kill him but suddenly experiences a moment of clarity as he realizes Optimus' personality was salvaged by Ethan. Fully consumed by madness, Megatron destroys the space bridge with himself on it to forever escape Optimus, and both disappear into oblivion.
26	Funeral for a Friend!	November 1986	—
After ten days of nonstop repair attempts, Ratchet remains unable to restore Optimus and pronounces the Autobot leader dead. Omega Supreme organizes a funeral and all the Autobots leave the Ark to attend, except for Ratchet, who resolves to try and finish repairing the other deactivated Autobots. He drives to a nearby junkyard to gather the necessary spare parts but accidentally interrupts a police sting operation to capture the Mechanic, the mastermind behind a stolen car operation. The Mechanic and his assistant commandeer Ratchet to escape, and he is forced to use his advanced Cybertronian weaponry to avoid hurting the police officers. The Mechanic removes the weapons and incapacitates Ratchet when he attempts to stop him as Omega and Perceptor oversee Optimus' funeral and launch his body into the stars. Ratchet recovers and inadvertently leads the Mechanic to the Ark, who takes control of its automated defenses and attacks the returning Autobots but flees when Ratchet and Prowl confront him.
27	King of the Hill!	December 1986	—
The Dinobots return to the Ark after hearing of Optimus Prime's funeral, and Grimlock plans to seize leadership of the Autobots. The Autobot commanders reject Grimlock's candidacy while Shockwave, once again the leader of the Decepticons, convinces their chief fuel auditor Ratbat to send the gigantic Decepticon warrior Trypticon to Earth via the space bridge to seize control of the Ark. Ratbat reluctantly agrees but warns Shockwave that they do not have enough fuel to use the bridge more than once. Later that night, Trypticon arrives and attacks the Ark, and the other Dinobots decide to leave the Autobots to their fate. Grimlock reconsiders and rescues a young human student named Rachel from Trypticon's foot soldier Wipe-Out, distracting Trypticon long enough for Ratbat to return him to Cybertron. Impressed by Grimlock's display of strength and selflessness, the Autobots make him their new leader.
28	Mechanical Difficulties!	January 1987	—
Grimlock orders Blaster and Goldbug to capture the Mechanic, who has upgraded his criminal empire with stolen Cybertronian technology, at any cost. The Autobots' attempts to stop the Mechanic are hindered by the police, under orders to attack any Cybertronian regardless of faction, and the Mechanic escapes in the confusion. The Mechanic later calls a meeting of all the crime bosses in the Pacific Northwest to display his modifications to their vehicles, but the police raid the meeting with Blaster and Goldbug's help. Together, they capture the crime bosses and the Mechanic's assistant, but the Mechanic himself escapes again. Blaster and Goldbug decide to strike out on their own, unconvinced of Grimlock's leadership capabilities.
29	Crater Critters!	February 1987	—
Blaster and Goldbug receive intel from G.B. Blackrock pointing them to a mysterious meteor that recently crashlanded in northern Arizona. The two Autobots are unaware that the "meteor" is actually a crashed space freighter sent by Ratbat to help steal Earth's energy and that the Decepticon Triple-Changers Astrotrain, Blitzwing, and Octane have been tasked with investigating the crash. The three Decepticons arrive only to discover that the freighter is infested with Scraplets, small metal-eating parasites that are extremely dangerous to Cybertronians and have no cure save one mysterious chemical. Blaster and Goldbug arrive and are attacked by the infected Decepticons, and the Scraplets quickly overwhelm Blaster. Goldbug and one of the human scientists tasked with investigating the "meteor" flee with a crushed Scraplet to analyze for a cure, only for Goldbug to be infected himself.
30	The Cure!	March 1987	—
Ratbat capture the Throttlebots and sends them to Earth with canisters of acid, giving them ten hours to destroy any Cybertronian infected with Scraplets before he destroys the planet. They start following Goldbug's tracks as the human scientist accompanying the infected Autobot accidentally discovers that the mysterious chemical capable of destroying Scraplets is water. The Throttlebots arrive and agree to help the scientist cure the other infected Cybertronians. The remaining Scraplets at the crater merge together into a large monster and attack the weaponless Throttlebot as Goldbug cures Blaster, Astrotrain, Blitzwing, and Octane. Together, the Autobots and Decepticons defeat the Scraplet monster long enough for Blaster to melt it with the Throttlebots' acid. Astrotrain secretly hypnotizes Blackrock before he and the other Triple-Changers escape with their cargo.
31	Buster Witwicky and the Car Wash of Doom!	April 1987	—
Under Ratbat's orders, a hypnotized Blackrock develops a "Wash and Roll" automated car wash service that hypnotizes the drivers into giving the Decepticons their car's fuel. One such "Wash and Roll" device is installed at Sparkplug Witwicky's garage, and Buster's girlfriend Jessie is accidentally hypnotized by the car wash while hanging out with Buster one night. Buster follows the hypnotized Jessie to a Blackrock-owned oil storage facility where Blackrock and Ratbat prepare to test a "Wash and Roll" Mark II, with a permanent hypnosis process, on Sparkplug. Buster intervenes and destroys a neon sign, snapping all the hypnotized humans out of their trance and forcing the Decepticons to flee. Blackrock promises to dismantle every "Wash and Roll" station currently active.
32	Used Autobots	May 1987	—
The Throttlebots attempt to escape from the Combaticon Vortex and attract the attention of RAAT; when they attempt to stay in a used car lot overnight, the lot's owner reports them to the authorities and incapacitates them. Both RAAT and the Combaticons arrive at the lot the next morning and fight for the Throttlebots, and the Protectobots soon join the battle looking for Blaster and Goldbug on Grimlock's orders. Blaster arrives as well and works with the Protectobots to drive the Combaticons away, but RAAT manages to escape with the Throttlebots in the confusion. When Blaster attempts to leave and pursue RAAT, however, Hot Spot informs him that he is under arrest for disobeying Grimlock's command, with a trial and execution to follow.
33 34	Man of Iron	June–July 1987	—
The Decepticon jets plant a probe beneath an ancient British castle while Sammy, the young son of the castle's curator, encounters Jazz in the woods. The terrified boy runs home and tells his father, who is reminded of an old legend of the Man of Iron. Supposedly, a giant metal man was sighted around the castle three times in the 11th century, and archival pictures of the Man of Iron bear a striking resemblance to Jazz. Mirage breaks into the castle that night to steal the Man of Iron pictures, while Jazz kidnaps Sammy and takes him to Optimus after fending off an attack from the Decepticon jets. Optimus informs Sammy that the Man of Iron is an ancient Autobot likely sent from Cybertron after the Ark crashed to find the mission Autobots. The Man of Iron reawakens and attacks the human military investigating the Decepticon sighting but is destroyed by Starscream. Jazz returns Sammy to his family as Optimus decides not to abandon Earth and orders the Man of Iron's ship completely destroyed to prevent any further attacks.
35	Child's Play	August 1987	—
As the Protectobots transport the imprisoned Blaster back to the Ark to stand trial for desertion, they are attacked by the Combaticons. Four nearby human children free Blaster and help distract Bruticus, the combined form of the Combaticons, long enough for Blaster to defeat the giant Decepticon. The Protectobots recover and decide not to rearrest Blaster, who takes control of the unconscious Blast Off and treats the four children to a ride in the Combaticon's space shuttle alternate mode. However, they are soon attacked by Grimlock, who has gotten the Ark spaceworthy again and intends to bring Blaster to justice.
36	Spacehikers!	September 1987	—
As Wheeljack's old friend Sky Lynx arrives in the vicinity of Earth to assist in overthrowing Grimlock's tyrannical rule of the Autobots, the children push Blaster out of an airlock to prevent him from being captured. Blast Off and the children are arrested, and Grimlock sentences them to death to draw out Blaster. Sky Lynx saves the children and draws the other Dinobots outside into space as Blaster sneaks aboard the Ark and meets the other Autobots, who beg him to take command from Grimlock. However, Blaster chooses to surrender to the Dinobots to prevent Sky Lynx and the children from being harmed.
37	Toy Soldiers!	October 1987	—
With the absence of the Autobots and the Ark from Earth, the Decepticons have been running completely unchecked across the planet. The government organizations tasked with monitoring the Cybertronians are thus under a significant amount of pressure for answers, but the information from the captive Throttlebots about the factional civil war is mostly ignored. The Throttlebots are sentenced to death by car compactor, but Walter Barnett transfers their brain modules into small toy cars to protect them. Barnett meets with Goldbug to help restore the Throttlebots as Ratbat and the Predacons notice the absence of the brain modules and realize the Autobots are still alive. Barnett and Goldbug secure Buster Witwicky's assistance in repairing the Throttlebots, but the Decepticons catch up to them at a local mall. The Predacons fail to capture the tiny toy cars and Buster escapes with the Autobots; however, they quickly discover that the Ark is no longer embedded in the volcano and Ratbat stowed away in their truck.
38	Trial by Fire!	November 1987	—
En route from Nebulos to Earth, the Autobot Headmasters rebuild their leader Fortress Maximus into a much larger and more powerful body. Spike Witwicky, the elder son of Sparkplug and older brother to Buster, arrives home from college to find his father's garage totaled and begins searching for his younger brother after learning of his family's involvement with the Cybertronians. The Headmasters arrive on Earth and find Goldbug's toy car form, accessing his recent memories to see Buster being kidnapped by Ratbat. Spike confronts the Headmasters but is unable to convince them to help rescue Buster as Scorponok and the Decepticon Headmasters arrive on Earth as well. The Autobot Headmasters return to the volcano and rescue Spike from Scorponok, and Fortress Maximus' secondary Headmaster component Galen is mortally wounded during the resulting battle. Spike accepts the Fortress Maximus control helmet from the dying Galen and returns to drive off the Decepticon Headmasters, and the Autobots accept him as their new leader.
39	The Desert Island of Space!	December 1987	—
Buster awakens to find himself imprisoned on the Decepticon island base with Shockwave and Ratbat arguing whether to kill him or use him as a hostage. Shockwave correctly believes the human military surrounding the base is unwilling to risk hurting Buster, and Walter Barnett informs Sparkplug of the dilemma. Spike reveals his new abilities as a Headmaster to his father and introduces him to his new Headmaster and Targetmaster troops, some of whom, like the grizzled veteran Kup, are distrustful of him. The Autobots attempt to storm the Decepticon island base, only for it to reveal its true nature as a giant spaceship and take off. Spike reconnects to Fortress Maximus in pursuit but is attacked in low orbit by Shockwave, who damages both Maximus and the connecting robot Cerebros, but he is knocked off the ship and seemingly burns up on re-entry. Spike briefly reunites with Buster before Ratbat pilots the ship into deep space, and the other Autobots fully welcome him to their ranks.
40	Pretender to the Throne!	January 1988	—
Ethan Zachary, the computer programmer who saved Optimus Prime's personality from destruction, has recreated the Autobot leader within a video game but remains unable to convince him that he was once an actual Cybertronian. Ethan calls Sparkplug to help jog Optimus' memory, but the elder Witwicky refuses to help and hangs up. Spike and Goldbug trace the call to Ethan and agree together to send the digital Optimus on a mission to possibly revive his memories. He infiltrates the computer system of a Decepticon-controlled genetics laboratory and steals Scorponok's plans to create the Pretenders. Goldbug successfully creates Autobot Pretenders based on the data, but the Decepticons trace the digital Optimus to Ethan's software company and attack. Although Optimus successfully coordinates the Autobot Pretenders in defense of the building, he fails to remember his true origins.
41	Totaled!	February 1988	—
The Autobot Headmasters and Targetmasters attempt to build Optimus' digitized consciousness a new body, but they previously used all of their available resources to rebuild Fortress Maximus and repair the damaged Goldbug. Fortress Maximus contacts the recently-located Ark for assistance, but Grimlock instead demands they hand over the fugitive Goldbug. Goldbug surrenders to avoid a fight, but Grimlock remains unsatisfied and challenges the injured Maximus to a one-on-one duel for leadership of the Autobots. In the Ark’s brig, Goldbug finds Blaster and convinces him to fight in Maximus' place as Soundwave detects the Autobot vessel. The two ships touch down on Earth's moon and the collective Autobot army watches as Blaster and Grimlock duel; the two combatants soon move away from the ships, and the Autobots are suddenly attacked by the Decepticons. As the leaderless Autobots start losing and Maximus orders Goldbug to take their ship and escape, Blaster and Grimlock notice the larger battle and agree to work together. Under their joint leadership, the Decepticons are forced into a retreat and Grimlock finally sees the value in working with others. Maximus reveals he sent Goldbug and a skeleton crew back to Nebulos, the only hope of restoring Optimus Prime to life.
42	People Power!	March 1988	—
On Nebulos, the Decepticons Dreadwind and Darkwing attack a local restaurant for the benefit of their ravenous bioengineered Nebulan passengers while Goldbug, Getaway, Slapdash, and Joyride ask the scientist Hi-Q for assistance in repairing Optimus. Hi-Q wants to help them but sadly informs the Autobots that their world is not fond of the Cybertronians, as Hi-Q was tasked with poisoning all potential Cybertronian fuels after the Autobot and Decepticon Headmasters departed. Dreadwind and Darkwing fell victim to the poisoning sometime later while looking for Scorponok's crew, but two jealous Nebulan scientists agreed to convert themselves into new power sources for the two Decepticons. The only downside to this Powermaster process is the Powermasters themselves must consume huge quantities of food in order to generate enough power for their Cybertronian partners. The Autobots are sorely defeated by the Decepticon Powermasters and fall victim to the poison as they finish construction on Optimus' new body. Although Optimus still believes he is a video game character, the sensation of pain from the poison finally convinces him he has returned, and Hi-Q and his staff volunteer to undergo the Powermaster conversion themselves to save the Autobots. The Autobot Powermasters easily defeat Dreadwind and Darkwing, and the Nebulan Council exiles their Nebulan partners Hi-Test and Throttle as well. The Autobot Powermasters also agree to leave Nebulos forever, and they begin the long journey home.
43	The Big Broadcast of 2006	April 1988	—
The Quintessons dispatch their Sharkticon hordes to the planet Junk to locate a lost artifact, but they are driven away by the native Junkions. Instead of challenging the awesome defensive power of the Junkions directly, the Quintessons instead infiltrate their beloved television networks and implant subliminal messaging that convinces the Junkions to hate all other lifeforms. As both the Autobots and Decepticons learn of the Junkions' sudden change in behavior, the Quintessons introduce a second layer of subliminal messaging that forces the Junkions to methodically search the planet for their lost artifact. Rodimus Prime orders the Aerialbots to investigate, but they are caught in the crossfire between the Junkions and Quintessons and accidentally damage both the Quintesson ship and broadcasting dish while attempting to escape. The damage to the broadcasting dish drives the Junkions to send the subliminal messaging all across the universe, and soon an intergalactic war threatens to begin on Junk. As Ultra Magnus and Blaster disrupt the broadcast, Rodimus battles a hypnotized Galvatron and destroys the container the Quintessons were looking for. The Junkions awaken from the hypnosis and celebrate as everyone leaves, leaving the Autobots confused as to what happened.
44	The Cosmic Carnival	May 1988	—
During their return to Earth, Optimus Prime and the Autobot Powermasters decide to visit the Cosmic Carnival after seeing Sky Lynx among the advertised attractions. Once there, they also find the four human children known as the Spacehikers on display and fail to convince Big Top, the carnival proprietor, to set them free. The Autobots reluctantly attend Sky Lynx's act and meet him backstage afterward, where he explains that he and the children visited the carnival after escaping from the Dinobots and were imprisoned after failing to pay the admission fee. The children's handler, a similarly-imprisoned alien named Berko, has a change of heart and helps Optimus and the children escape. Big Top attacks Goldbug in retaliation, but he traps him inside one of the sideshow cages, and the Autobots and Spacehikers leave the carnival behind.
45	Monstercon from Mars!	June 1988	—
Production trouble abounds on the set of a terrible monster movie, and the director Rollie Friendly sees a news broadcast of Sky Lynx returning the Spacehikers to Earth while searching for more inspiration. He briefly considers using a robot for the villain, but his PR manager cites an overwhelmingly bad public perception of giant robots; instead, the movie crew leaves in search of Bigfoot but finds the Decepticon Pretender Skullgrin instead. Friendly offers Skullgrin a paid job as a movie star, and Skullgrin, remembering Scorponok's orders to establish a secret fuel depot, agrees on the condition he is paid in fuel. The deal surprisingly works in both parties' favor, and Skullgrin becomes a massively popular movie star seemingly overnight. While filming his next movie at the Grand Canyon, a wheelchair-using Skullgrin super-fan suddenly reveals herself as Circuit Breaker, and the two begin dueling in front of Friendly's cameras. During the fight, Skullgrin almost allows his female co-star to fall to her death, but Circuit Breaker encourages him to save her. Although she strikes Skullgrin down immediately afterward, she leaves in disgust after Friendly offers her extra money to kill Skullgrin on camera.
46	Ca$h and Car-nage!	July 1988	—
The mysterious Z-Foundation recruits four bounty hunters to eliminate Cybertronians using a new kind of jamming technology that can block their ability to transform. On Cybertron, the Decepticon Firecons release the imprisoned Autobot Sparkabots and send them to Earth, where they are ambushed and deactivated by the bounty hunters, now calling themselves the Roadjammers. However, the Roadjammers become suspicious that the Z-Foundation recruiters are working with the Decepticons and resolve to capture them as well to receive an even larger reward from the foundation's leader, Mr. Z. They do indeed discover that the recruiters are Decepticon Headmaster partners and successfully bring them under control of the jamming technology, at which point Mr. Z reveals himself to be the Decepticon Headmaster Lord Zarak. The Roadjammers turn the six jammed Cybertronians against Zarak and Scorponok, and Zarak reluctantly activates an anti-jammer to release everyone. The Autobots save the Roadjammers and depart, while the bounty hunters plan to continue using the jamming technology for their own purposes.
47	Club Con!	August 1988	—
To the great bemusement of the Autobots, Ratbat and the Decepticons have converted their island headquarters into a bustling tourist resort for humans called "Club Con," with no clear reason as to why. Blaster and Buster's girlfriend Jessie infiltrate Club Con on a surveillance mission and soon discover the Seacons suspiciously entering and exiting the underwater mechanical sublevels. They sneak inside and discover the missing Buster imprisoned, who tells them that the Decepticons are looking for two ancient Autobot cassettees hidden inside a treasure chest and carrying extremely valuable data. Blaster and Jessie reluctantly leave Buster to keep their cover, but the Seacons return with the treasure chest and Jessie exposes herself after stealing the cassettes. Blaster is forced to jettison the cassettes back into the ocean to protect Club Con's human occupants, and he and Jessie retreat with plans to return as soon as possible.
48	The Flames of Boltax!	September 1988	—
Ratbat and the Decepticons test a new full-sensory holographic system on Buster before reviewing the long-lost Autobot cassettes. Ratbat and Starscream start the program and find themselves witnessing events from four million years in Cybertron's past: a convoy consisting of the Triggerbots and Optimus Prime, not yet the Supreme Commander of the Autobots, plans to enlist the help of High Councilor Boltax's vast stores of knowledge. The Autobots press onward despite knowing they are violating one of the few neutrality agreements between the two factions, unaware that Megatron and the Triggercons are following them. Only Optimus is granted access to Boltax's temple and the power of the Underbase – an endless database holding the combined knowledge of the Cybertronian race. Megatron blasts his way into the temple and attempts to take the Underbase for himself, but Optimus, understanding that its power is too great, ejects the database into space, an act that will haunt him for the rest of his life. As Ratbat and Starscream realize that the Underbase's infinite power is real, Soundwave informs them that the Underbase itself will enter Earth's vicinity in a week. Buster, who had previously escaped and witnessed the broadcast, attempts to sneak out and warn the Autobots but is discovered.
49	Cold War!	October 1988	—
The Decepticons move Club Con to the Arctic Circle and almost order the combiner Piranacon to destroy a ship containing Scorponok's Headmasters. Starscream innocently claims to the suspicious Ratbat that he and Scorponok had made a prior agreement to work together before the Club Con scheme, fully aware that Ratbat wanted to keep the Headmasters away until the Underbase had been retrieved. As the Autobots search for the Decepticon headquarters, Starscream manipulates the captive Buster into telling Scorponok about the Underbase, which then escalates into a fight between Ratbat's Decepticons and Scorponok's Headmasters. For the final stage of his plan, Starscream strands Buster on an ice shelf and gives him a homing beacon powerful enough to contact the Autobots, which Buster understands will inspire the two Decepticon armies to rejoin and slaughter them. Nevertheless, he activates the beacon as Starscream steals Scorponok's ship and escapes.
50	Dark Star	November 1988	—
The Autobots respond to Buster's homing signal and are confronted by the combined forces of Ratbat and Scorponok's Decepticons. Ratbat realizes from Buster's testimony that Starscream has manipulated them all to take the Underbase's power for himself and agrees to an alliance with the Autobots. However, Starscream has already found the Underbase and bathes in the light of its knowledge and power. Optimus uses Club Con's gun emplacements to stop him from absorbing more than a small fraction of the database, but the supercharged Starscream cripples the island ship and leaves the combined forces of the Autobots and Decepticons stranded in space. He returns to Earth and sets about destroying various major cities, and Optimus summons the Ark to take teams of Autobots and Decepticons to intercept him. However, they are no match for the Underbase-empowered Starscream, who kills nearly every Autobot and Decepticon warrior save the organic-shelled Pretenders and the binary-bonded Headmasters, Targetmasters, and Powermasters. Optimus and Hi-Q build a rocket aboard the Ark to redirect the Underbase away from Earth, and a stray radio transmission from Buster alerts Starscream to the deception as Ratbat and Scorponok confront Optimus. Scorponok shoots Optimus and kills Ratbat before leaving to collect the Underbase himself, and Optimus manages to repair himself and drag Scorponok away just as the Underbase collides with Starscream instead of Earth. The full power of the Underbase proves too much for Starscream's body to handle, and he is obliterated. Scorponok reluctantly thanks Optimus for saving them all and agrees to leave in peace, but warns that the fighting will resume the next day.
51	The Man in the Machine!	December 1988	—
After the events of the Underbase Saga, Spike Witwicky resolves to leave the Autobots and his control over Fortress Maximus behind and abandons his Headmaster control helmet. However, his nightmares continue and the Decepticon Pretenders Carnivac and Snarler track him as he leaves for a ski vacation with a friend. The two humans manage to evade the Decepticons long enough for Spike to remotely summon Maximus, and he reluctantly recombines with Cerebros and Maximus to send the Decepticons into a retreat.
52	Guess Who the Mecannibals Are Having for Dinner?	January 1989	—
Optimus sends the Autobot Pretenders Cloudburst and Landmine to acquire enough black-market microchips to repair the many Autobots still damaged after the Underbase incident. They unknowingly connect with the Decepticon Powermasters Hi-Test and Throttle and learn from former Autobot ally Berko that Sky Lynx recently went missing after visiting the market. Landmine convinces the two "dealers" to take them directly to their suppliers, and they are met by the Mecannibals, robot-eating mechanical lifeforms who are preparing to feast on the captive Sky Lynx. Landmine manages to free Sky Lynx and obtain the necessary microchips, but Hi-Test and Throttle witness the Autobot Pretenders reveal their robotic nature to Berko afterward. The anti-robot customers of the black market drive them away, whereupon Dreadwind and Darkwing bring them back to the Mecannibals to replace the lost meal.
53	Recipe for Disaster!	February 1989	—
The Mecannibals extract Cloudburst and Landmine's inner robot forms from their Pretender shells, but they trick the dim-witted cannibals into releasing them in exchange for gathering enough seasoning to make themselves taste better. With Berko being held hostage to ensure their cooperation, the two Autobots travel to Femax, a world dominated by female warriors who view men as fundamentally inferior. Cloudburst impresses their leader, the First One, with his fighting prowess and quick wit and is approached to be her mate and second-in-command. The First One chops his head off upon learning he is not a biological being, and the short-tempered Landmine is forced to peacefully defuse the situation and obtain the necessary crystals for seasoning. The Autobots attempt to leave Femax and are stopped by Dreadwind and Darkwing, but Sky Lynx ambushes the two Decepticons and takes them out. Cloudburst, Landmine, and Sky Lynx return to the Mecannibals and casually inform them that their trusted dealers Hi-Test and Throttle are actually robots, and depart as they begin pursuing the Decepticon Powermasters.
54	King Con!	March 1989	—
Three humans venture into the New Jersey swamps to investigate monster sightings but encounter the Decepticon Pretender Iguanas instead. Later, Optimus and Hi-Q meet the Autobot Micromasters, reinforcements sent from Cybertron to replenish their depleted forces after the Underbase incident. Although Hi-Q is skeptical of the Micromasters' abilities, Optimus assigns them to investigate both the sighting of Iguanas and strange unmoving storm systems gathering over the area. The Micromasters eventually discover that Scorponok and the other Decepticon Pretenders plan to harness the vast electrical energy of the storms they created. As the Micromasters engage the Decepticons and learn of the storm plot from an escaping human reporter, Iguanas climbs up to the top of the Empire State Building to place the electricity-absorbing device as close to the storm as possible. Instead, the Micromasters knock the device off the building, and Iguanas is struck by the full force of the lightning storm and killed.
55	The Interplanetary Wrestling Championship!	April 1989	—
Since defeating the Decepticon Pretenders, the Autobot Micromasters have decided to sever ties with Optimus Prime and stay in New York City. Local wrestling star Jake "The Jackhammer" Jackson challenges Roadhandler to a match, and the macho Micromaster agrees after learning that professional wrestling is staged and he and Jake will not actually be harming one another. The match is a success and Roadhandler soon becomes a celebrity with his own fan club of young children. Lord Zarak approaches Roadhandler and challenges him to face the Decepticon Micromaster Storm Cloud in the ring, with the added caveat that he throws the match to save the lives of his young fans. Although Roadhandler complies, the other Autobot Micromasters rescue the fan club and inspire him to fight back and win the match. Angry that human lives were needlessly put in danger, Roadhandler quits the wrestling scene forever and tells his fans to believe in themselves rather than their heroes.
56	Back from the Dead!	May 1989	—
Stressed nearly to madness by the constant pressure to repair the dozens of fallen Autobots, Ratchet now suffers recurring nightmares of undead Autobots tearing him apart. Although Optimus attempts to convince his old friend to take a break, he is called away to investigate a Decepticon Micromaster attack at a nearby airfield. However, the attack was a diversion meant to empty the Ark of all Autobots save Ratchet, and a second team of Micromasters infiltrates the medic's workspace to place the deactivated Autobots under remote control. Ratchet nearly surrenders upon seeing his nightmares come to life, but he resists long enough for the Micromasters to change plans, stop the remote control, and disguise themselves as Autobots seeking Ratchet's assistance back on Cybertron. Ratchet falls for the ruse and brings the bodies of Jazz, Goldbug, and Grimlock with him for repairs but quickly finds himself held at gunpoint by the Micromasters. However, he is horrified when their leader emerges from the shadows – Megatron!
57	The Resurrection Gambit!	June 1989	—
On Earth, the Decepticon Micromasters accidentally inform Optimus of their role as a diversion, but Scorponok's forces arrive and prevent the Autobots from returning to the Ark. Megatron coerces Ratchet into supervising the construction of a super Pretender armor by revealing his agents have wired the Ark to explode and tells him the story of his return. When an insane Megatron previously destroyed the space bridge, he was blown clear of the explosion and materialized on Cybertron in an amnesiac and disoriented state. He wandered the ruined cities and wastelands until he came across a pair of Autobots torturing a Decepticon, whereupon his memories and personality were restored and he assumed command of the Micromasters to reinsert himself into the Decepticon leadership. As a furious Optimus singlehandedly plows through Scorponok's troops, Megatron horrifies Ratchet further by informing him that he requires Starscream to be repaired as the new Pretender armor's first test subject.
58	All the Familiar Faces!	July 1989	—
Ratchet reluctantly incorporates Starscream into the new Pretender armor and secretly uses the other three Pretender shells to repair Jazz, Goldbug, and Grimlock. On Earth, Optimus orders the Autobots to return to the Ark and assist Ratchet while he stays behind to continue fighting Scorponok's Decepticons, but Hot Rod refuses to leave Optimus. The Autobot leader convinces Zarak that they have both been manipulated by whoever is commanding the Decepticon Micromasters, and the two commanders agree to an alliance. Ratchet completes the repairs on Starscream and wipes the treacherous Decepticon's memory at Megatron's request, but he refuses to uphold his end of the deal and activates the detonation sequence. Prepared for this betrayal, Ratchet manages to escape his Micromaster guards long enough to revive Jazz, Grimlock, and Goldbug (returned to his old self Bumblebee) as Pretenders while the mindless Starscream arrives on Earth and confronts Optimus and Zarak.
59	Skin Deep	August 1989	—
Megatron laughs at Ratchet's feeble sabotage attempt as the weakened Grimlock is quickly defeated, but Bumblebee and Jazz distract him long enough for Ratchet to escape. Starscream attacks Optimus and Scorponok's Decepticons as Kup and the other Autobots attempt to defuse the explosives aboard the Ark. Megatron dispatches the revived Autobots before leaving to search for Ratchet, who makes contact with the Ark to help dispose of the bombs. As Starscream dispatches all of the Cybertronians except Optimus and Zarak, Hot Rod regains consciousness long enough to help Scorponok electrocute Starscream's Pretender shell, which disrupts the mental blocks Ratchet installed and restores the Decepticon's cowardly personality. Megatron finds Ratchet just as he manages to teleport the Ark’s explosives to the Decepticon fortress, and both are seemingly destroyed as Megatron's fortress explodes.
60	Yesterday’s Heroes!	December 1989	—
Optimus breaks down over the loss of his old friend Ratchet, and the other Autobots worry about his mental state as the new Autobot Pretenders Jazz, Bumblebee, and Grimlock lead a series of successful raids on Decepticon fuel depots on Cybertron. The Decepticon commander Lord Thunderwing sends the Mayhem Attack Squad, consisting of Pretenders Bludgeon, Octopunch, and Stranglehold, to destroy the Autobots. Hot Rod reprograms a Guardian drone to attack the Autobots and snap Optimus into action, and although the drone runs out of control, Optimus does indeed realize that giving up would dishonor the memories of all the fallen Autobots. The Mayhem Attack Squad attack the Autobot Pretenders and their troops as they attempt to teleport back to Earth, and Bludgeon sabotages the teleportation, sending everyone into a strange underground labyrinth. As they make their way to the light at the end of the tunnel, they find themselves standing before Primus, the God and creator of all Cybertronians.
61	The Primal Scream	October 1989	—
Grimlock is unconvinced that Primus is actually real, so the ancient Keeper guarding Primus' inert form recounts the cosmic history of the Cybertronians and their gods. Long ago, at the dawn of time, two gods representing good and evil fought across the physical universe and the astral plane: Primus and Unicron. In a last-ditch attempt to contain his brother's destruction, Primus sealed himself and Unicron inside two metal asteroids forever. However, Unicron soon learned to manipulate his prison and transformed it into a planetoid capable of consuming entire worlds and shifting into a robot mode. In response, Primus shaped his own asteroid into Cybertron and created a race of smaller transforming robots to eventually serve as his proxies in the battle against Unicron, and went into hibernation to prevent Unicron from finding him. The Mayhem Attack Squad recovers and attacks the Autobots as the Earth-based Decepticons confront Scorponok over his decision to bring Starscream back into the fold after he massacred them all twice. In a moment of desperation, Bumblebee prays to Primus for assistance, and he and the other Autobots suddenly receive a burst of strength that allows them to defeat the Decepticons. Octopunch attempts to shoot Grimlock in the back, but the shot ricochets directly into Primus' face and awakens the sleeping god. Primus lets out a scream that reverberates through Cybertron and across the cosmos and the Autobots teleport back to Earth, hoping that nothing else heard the scream. However, somewhere in deep space, Unicron awakens from hibernation.
62	Bird of Prey!	November 1989	—
The Autobots across Earth and Cybertron begin scattering their forces across the galaxy to search for the lost Creation Matrix in the hopes of using it against the coming threat of Unicron. Autobot Headmasters Nightbeat, Siren, and Hosehead travel to the seedy underworld planet of Pz-Zazz, where they are drawn into a fight with local gangsters and given a mysterious bird statue by a dying alien. Siren and Hosehead force Nightbeat, an enthusiastic detective, to ignore the bird statue and stay focused on finding the Matrix, but a local woman named Miss Fatale offers to take them to a hidden source of healing power in exchange for the statue. After avoiding several rival gangs also looking for the statue, Nightbeat determines that the statue itself is the source of healing power, and its absence from a sacred temple is responsible for Pz-Zazz's environmental decline. The Autobots replace the statue and restore the planet's natural beauty, but they are ambushed and captured by Thunderwing's Decepticons.
63	Kings of the Wild Frontier	December 1989	—
The Triggerbots travel to the desert planet Cheyne in their search for the Matrix. They manage to save a child from being run down and are taken in by his parents for the night, unaware that Thunderwing and his Decepticons have also arrived on Cheyne after learning of the Matrix Quest from the captive Nightbeat, Siren, and Hosehead. As Thunderwing secretly plots to take control of the Matrix's power for himself, Optimus attempts to psychically locate the Matrix only to witness a vision of Unicron consuming all Cybertronians. The Triggerbots are tricked into staying longer and longer, eventually forgetting everything about the Matrix Quest, the coming danger, and even their own identities. Thunderwing attacks the amnesiac Dogfight but soon determines he is useless and orders his Decepticons to retreat; however, the beating snapped Dogfight out of the trance, and he returns to find the family is actually a group of psychic vampires consuming their life-forces. The other Triggerbots also awaken from their trances, and the three Autobots are forced to kill the vampires.
64	Deadly Obsession	January 1990	—
The Autobot Pretenders Longtooth, Pincher, and Doubleheader sail across the mercury seas of the planet Pequod searching for the Klud, a recently-sighted extinct sea monster that could have been revived by the Matrix's power. While making a forensic analysis of a shipwreck caused by the Klud, the monster bit Longtooth's leg off, driving him insane and causing him to abandon the quest in favor of killing the Klud. Pincher and Doubleheader reluctantly collaborate with Thunderwing's Decepticons to stop him, and Thunderwing learns that the Klud revitalized itself by eating an escape pod overcharged with Matrix energy that originated from the moon VsQs. As Pincher begs Longtooth to remember himself and the Autobot code, Thunderwing and the Decepticons leave the Klud in favor of traveling to VsQs and potentially finding the Matrix.
65	Dark Creation	February 1990	—
After being launched off of Earth during his funeral, Optimus Prime's dead body crashlands on the barren moon of VsQs, and the Creation Matrix within his chest is soon reactivated when a dying droid accidentally harnesses its power to become the Deathbringer. The Matrix learns of such feelings as pain, fear, and evil from the Deathbringer's rampage and later transforms a small predatory creature exposed to its power into a much larger monster to continue exploring its curiosity. The Matrix-born monster slaughters a group of scientists sent to study and contain it, and it is this carnage that Jazz, Grimlock, and Bumblebee discover upon their arrival to VsQs. Thunderwing disrupts their exploration of the scientists' encampment and demands the Matrix as Ruckus accidentally releases the Autobot Headmasters imprisoned aboard the Decepticon ship. The Matrix monster ambushes the fighting Autobots and Decepticons, accidentally leading Thunderwing to the Matrix's resting place, while on Earth, a shadowy cyclopean figure rises from the ocean and kills a human witness. Later, Optimus waits to receive the returning Autobot Pretenders, only for Thunderwing to emerge from their shuttle bearing the Matrix.
66	All Fall Down	March 1990	—
On his way to Cybertron, Unicron consumes the planet Ghennix, reformats three of its victims into his heralds Hook, Line, and Sinker, and sends them on a journey through space and time. Thunderwing uses the power of the Matrix to dispatch Hot Rod's group of Autobots and gravely injure Optimus, but the Autobot leader tricks Thunderwing into explaining how he managed to secure the Matrix long enough for reinforcements to arrive. The corrupted essence of the Matrix fully consumes Thunderwing's mind as the escaped Autobot prisoners secretly watch on while the shadowy figure plots to use Starscream to take command of the Decepticons. Thunderwing realizes he is losing control of himself once he becomes aware that the Matrix is killing Autobots and Decepticons alike, and Nightbeat, Siren, and Hosehead manage to suck both out into space.
67	Rhythms of Darkness!	April 1990	—
In the year 2009, Unicron has devoured Cybertron and left Earth under the apocalyptic command of the Decepticons. Galvatron forces the Pretender Monsters to search the ruins of New York City for Autobots, despite the fact that he personally controls both American continents and has all but broken the Autobot resistance. Meanwhile, a group of rebel humans and Autobots led by Spike Witwicky race against a coming European nuclear strike to attack the Decepticon stronghold. They successfully break into the stronghold, but Galvatron soon arrives and slaughters them. Jazz sacrifices himself long enough for Spike to plan an American flag atop the stronghold, signaling the Europeans to abort the nuclear strike. Before Galvatron can kill the insolent human, Hook, Line, and Sinker suddenly appear and whisk him away, giving the remaining members of the resistance a fighting chance to save their home.
68	The Human Factor!	May 1990	—
In the aftermath of RAAT's failure and collapse, G.B. Blackrock is given permission to assemble a team of superheroes to deal with Cybertronian incidents. He successfully recruits two bitter and broken outcasts codenamed Thunderpunch and Rapture before sending them to hunt down a potential third member known as Mister X, real name Hector Dialonzo, who recently killed one of the Decepticon Micromaster Patrols with his near-limitless energy powers. However, Starscream plans to use Dialonzo as well to take command of the Decepticons from Scorponok, but neither party realizes that Circuit Breaker is also seeking Dialonzo's power. A three-way fight breaks out between Circuit Breaker, Starscream, and Blackrock's team for Dialonzo's allegiance before he stops the fight and forces everyone to explain their perspective. Starscream is knocked out by Rapture, and both Dialonzo and Circuit Breaker agree to join Blackrock's team. When Starscream awakens, he is met by the shadowy figure, who reveals himself as Shockwave and offers his own alliance against Scorponok.
69	Eye of the Storm	June 1990	—
As the Autobots relax and grow complacent between missions, Optimus worries that Unicron's coming threat will prove unstoppable now that the Matrix is lost again. He meets with Nightbeat, who informs him that Ratchet could have survived the explosion by using the Decepticons' trans-time dimensional portal, and he is currently building a probe to search the realm between dimensions for his bio-mechanical signature. The Galvatron from the postapocalyptic future of 2009 is brought before Unicron, who explains that he is not Galvatron's original Unicron but requires his services anyway. Optimus informs the shocked Autobots that he plans to offer Scorponok an unconditional surrender in order to form an alliance against Unicron, unaware that Shockwave, Starscream, and Ravage plan to stage a coup against his leadership. An angry Grimlock knocks Kup out, retrieves the other Dinobots from stasis, and escapes. Optimus explains to Nightbeat that Grimlock had found reports stating that Nucleon, a new and extremely powerful fuel found on Hydrus Four, could be used to revive the fallen Autobots but would most likely induce negative side effects like dementia and paranoia. However, any further discussion is tabled when Nightbeat's probe returns with Ratchet, whose body has been hideously mutated and fused with Megatron.
70	The Pri₵e of Life!	July 1990	—
As the Autobots stare in horror at the Ratchet-Megatron fusion, Kup draws his gun on the Megatron half and gives the creature an opportunity to escape. Optimus, Nightbeat, and Kup argue over the possibility of saving Ratchet versus the danger Megatron poses as Grimlock begins searching Hydrus Four for the supposed well of Nucleon. The creature barricades itself in the Ark’s engine room and begins damaging critical systems, and Optimus finally concedes to Kup's concerns; he overcomes the creature and finds himself still unable to kill it, but it places Optimus' gun on its forehead in a silent plea for death. Grimlock finds the Nucleon and seemingly rejuvenates himself with no ill side effects as Optimus is informed that Ratchet cannot be saved without also saving Megatron. The Autobot leader reluctantly gives the order to fix them both.
71	Surrender!	August 1990	—
Optimus surrenders the Autobots to Scorponok, who confiscates their weaponry and has them all locked in the brig. Although the Decepticons have not been pleased with Scorponok's recent tenure as leader, they promise to forgive him if he rejects the alliance against Unicron with Optimus as Shockwave, Starscream, and Ravage recruit Mindwipe and Triggerhappy into their coup. On Cybertron, Galvatron, Hook, Line, and Sinker attack the Autobot headquarters and force its leader Emirate Xaaron to flee into the underground sewers. Fed up with waiting for Scorponok to make a decision regarding the alliance, Optimus breaks himself, Hot Rod, and Kup out and goes to confront him. However, they find Zarak in the midst of a crisis over placing command of the Decepticons above his honor and the coming threat of Unicron. Zarak agrees to the alliance but is interrupted when Shockwave's team bombs the base while Galvatron pursues Xaaron.
72	...All This and Civil War 2	September 1990	—
Shockwave's Decepticons begin searching the base's rubble for survivors, only to find a furious Scorponok, while Optimus attempts to rally the Autobots to prevent yet another Decepticon civil war from breaking out and disrupting the alliance. Galvatron catches up to Xaaron but surprises the old Autobot by requesting his help in stopping Unicron, disavowing his supposed loyalty to the dark god. Xaaron informs him that, although the Matrix is gone, it may be possible to defeat Unicron by gathering all of Primus' children together in one place. Grimlock revives the other Dinobots with a Nucleon infusion but suddenly finds his body beginning to paralyze as Optimus desperately attempts to stop Scorponok and Shockwave's factions. Scorponok demands that Optimus kill Shockwave or the alliance is off, but the warring Cybertronians are suddenly interrupted by Blackrock's superhuman team, the Neo-Knights.
73	Out of Time!	October 1990	—
Galvatron and Xaaron descend into the center of Cybertron to begin awakening Primus, and a suspicious Unicron sends Hook, Line, and Sinker to find his wayward time-traveling servant. The Neo-Knights quickly dispatch Scorponok, and Shockwave uses the opportunity to attack Circuit Breaker, whose understanding of the distinction between Autobot and Decepticon vanishes as she rages against every Cybertronian present. Mindwipe places Soundwave under his hypnotic control as Blackrock diverts Circuit Breaker's fury from Optimus to Shockwave, who was the cause of her injuries as Josie Beller many years ago that led to her transformation. Primus awakens and possesses Xaaron to serve as his vessel, and Galvatron begs the god to help mount a defense against Unicron. In response, every single Cybertronian on Earth vanishes, while the Matrix, trapped in deep space on Thunderwing's body, begins to hunger for revenge.
74	The Void!	November 1990	—
The Cybertronians abducted from Earth are brought before Primus, who informs them of their origins and the threat of Unicron, naming Optimus as their leader in the coming battle. The Dinobots return to the Ark and begin reviving the deactivated Autobots with Nucleon, unaware that Megatron is among the fallen, while Unicron's cultists on Cybertron prepare for war. Scorponok confesses his growing fear of death in Optimus, who similarly confides that he is tired of serving as a pawn in Primus and Unicron's ancient rivalry. The cultists ambush the two leaders but leave Scorponok alone in favor of swarming Optimus; the Decepticon considers fleeing but chooses to stay and help his new friend, and he is soon joined by Galvatron in protecting Optimus. As the Matrix restores Thunderwing's body for its own purposes, the other Autobots and Decepticons arrive and defeat the remaining cultists. Primus informs Optimus that they were innocent Cybertronian placed under Unicron's thrall and served as a final test for the Autobot-Decepticon alliance, but Kup interrupts the discussion to point out that Unicron's arrival.
75	On the Edge of Extinction!	December 1990	—
Unicron's sheer size and power causes the assembled Cybertronians to flee in terror as he begins tearing into Cybertron. Although Primus attempts to convince Optimus and Scorponok to rally their troops, it is Galvatron who inspires the two armies to stand their ground and fight. Many Autobots and Decepticons are killed in the battle, most notably Scorponok in a final stand as a Decepticon warrior, but Grimlock and the revived Autobots soon arrive in the Ark as reinforcements. Unicron causes the Autobot ship to crash as the Matrix, possessing Thunderwing's corpse, arrives to confront its old foe, but its descent into corruption leaves it vulnerable to Unicron's powers. As Unicron rips Thunderwing apart and prepares to destroy Cybertron, he is distracted by a frenzied Circuit Breaker just long enough for Optimus to grab the Matrix, purge it of its darkness, and throw himself into Unicron's maw. As the Autobots and Decepticons look on in awe, Optimus Prime's sacrifice causes Unicron to explode with Primus' power, destroying both gods and saving Cybertron. Sometime after the battle, a hidden Hi-Q watches as Runabout is dragged underground by a clawed hand and ripped to shreds.
76	Still Life!	January 1991	—
With Unicron destroyed, the Autobots and Decepticons gather around the dying Optimus long enough to hear him name Grimlock as the new leader of the Autobots. Hi-Q flees the mysterious creatures that killed Runabout as Prowl forces an unenthusiastic Grimlock to accept the responsibilities, who instead wants to lead the Dinobots on an expedition to find the group of Autobots that stole the Ark in the aftermath of Unicron's attack. After making Grimlock vow to uphold Optimus' legacy, Prowl lets him and the Dinobots leave; however, Grimlock's body is suddenly paralyzed just as Hi-Q and the monsters find the remaining Dinobots, who are forced into battle to defend their helpless leader. Starscream and Shockwave, the Ark’s actual thieves, attempt to repair the damaged ship as Galvatron watches them from the shadows. As the Dinobots begin to falter to the creatures, Hi-Q accelerated the Nucleon-fueled changes happening within Grimlock's body, reviving him with a burst of power. He singlehandedly dispatches the remaining creatures, but reveals he is no longer able to transform as Hi-Q claims to be Optimus Prime.
77	Exodus!	February 1991	—
As Cybertron's weather worsens in the wake of Unicron's destruction, the remaining Decepticon forces increasingly consider the Autobots responsible for the general disorder and chaos around them. Prowl's attempts to preserve the alliance are mostly ignored by Grimlock, Bludgeon, and Krok, but Blaster presents a seismographic report stating that Cybertron is tearing itself apart without Primus' lifeforce, and the planet needs to be evacuated. Shockwave and Starscream prepare the Ark for takeoff, unaware that Galvatron has stowed away on board, while Grimlock's dismissal of Prowl and subsequent beatdown of a disrespectful Fangry gives Bludgeon and Krok the chance to turn the Decepticons against the Autobots. As the Neo-Knights lose patience being trapped in a cell with a catatonic Circuit Breaker and a rambling Hi-Q, still claiming to be Optimus, Prowl and Wheeljack discover the Decepticons sabotaged all of the Autobots' escape vessels before leaving Cybertron. Aboard the Ark, Galvatron emerges from hiding only to be confronted by Megatron.
78	A Savage Circle	March 1991	—
The sight of Megatron causes Galvatron's fragile sanity to completely snap, and he attacks his own past self without hesitation; Megatron readily engages, still unstable from the Nucleon infusion and believing himself to be fighting Ratchet. As Bludgeon's Decepticons choose a planet at random to conquer, Ratchet awakens to find a psychic link formed between himself and Megatron as Starscream and Shockwave find the dueling Decepticons. Megatron is weakened by Galvatron and finished by Shockwave as Starscream confronts Ratchet, while Grimlock unveils a set of hidden Decepticon battleships he had stolen millions of years earlier, allowing the Autobots to leave Cybertron. Megatron and Galvatron make an alliance to destroy Shockwave while Ratchet, knowing the danger the two Decepticons pose, destroys the Nucleon storage reactor and causes the Ark to crashland on Earth once again.
79	The Last Autobot?	1991	—
Galvatron survives the Ark’s second crash on Earth and immediately beings slaughtering humans, forcing Spike Witwicky to combine with Fortress Maximus to stop him. With the Autobots and Decepticons gone, the only remaining living beings on Cybertron are the Neo-Knights and Hi-Q, who begins leading them down into the planet's core toward something – or someone – known as the Last Autobot. The Autobots pursue the Decepticons, who have already conquered and destroyed their chosen world and prepare to receive them in battle. The already-insane Galvatron completely loses it when Maximus attacks him, and the Autobot Headmaster is nearly killed due to the continuing tension between Spike and Maximus. However, the two finally put aside their differences to truly join minds, and the united Maximus defeats Galvatron and throws him to the bottom of a frozen lake.
80	End of the Road!	May 1991	—
Having already found Grimlock's tracking devices aboard their ships, the Decepticons slaughter the Autobots and pursue the last five survivors, among them Grimlock and Prowl. Blaster is killed as the Decepticons find their hiding place, while Bludgeon is suddenly attacked by the Neo-Knights and, to his horror, a restored Optimus Prime. Optimus introduces the shocked Bludgeon to the Last Autobot, who informs the Decepticon leader that he was awoken after Primus' death by Hi-Q, a chosen blend of the organic and the machine who carried pieces of Optimus' soul within him. The Last Autobot used his vast powers to reformat Hi-Q into a new Optimus and restore Cybertron, and now revives the fallen Autobots as the Decepticons are forced to retreat. Bludgeon's troops depart for exile and a chance to rebuild their strength as Optimus, once again the leader of the Autobots, informs his troops that their war is finally over and that they can return to Cybertron in peace.

=== Writers ===
From issue #56, the by then well-known writer of Transformers Marvel UK, Simon Furman took over the reins, having been asked by Marvel US, after Budiansky had grown tired of the comic.

== UK title ==
The US run also inspired a Marvel UK sister title that spliced original stories into the continuity, running for 332 issues (September 1984 – July 1991).

== The Transformers: Regeneration One ==
In July 2011, it was announced that IDW Publishing has signed up Simon Furman, Andrew Wildman and Stephen Baskerville (Wildman's Transformers inker) to make a continuation of the Marvel Transformers comic, consisting of 20 issues from #81 to #100 (July 2012 – March 2014), titled The Transformers: Regeneration One.
