= Marvel Comics Super Special =

Comic book series

Marvel Super Special
- Cover of Marvel Comics Super Special #1 (September 1977), art by Alan Weiss and Gray Morrow.

Publication information
- Publisher: Marvel Comics
- Schedule: Irregular
- Format: Standard
- Publication date: September 1977 – November 1986
- No. of issues: 40 (#1–6 and #8–41)

Creative team
- Written by: List: Cary Burkett, Tom DeFalco, J. M. DeMatteis, Sharman DiVono, Mark Evanier, Danny Fingeroth, Michael Fleisher, Steve Gerber, Archie Goodwin, Larry Hama, Sid Jacobson, Stan Kay, David Anthony Kraft, Ralph Macchio, Bill Mantlo, Rick Marschall, Roger McKenzie, David Michelinie, Doug Moench, Steve Moore, Dennis O'Neil, Louise Simonson, Walt Simonson, Roy Thomas, Marv Wolfman
- Penciller: List: Brent Anderson, Kyle Baker, Bret Blevins, Joe Barney, Joe Brozowski, Rich Buckler, John Buscema, Sal Buscema, Howard Chaykin, Dave Cockrum, Gene Colan, Ernie Colón, Ron Frenz, Jackson Guice, Larry Hama, Jimmy Janes, Gray Morrow, Win Mortimer, Paul Neary, Michael Netzer, George Pérez, John Romita Jr., Marie Severin, Bill Sienkiewicz, Walt Simonson, Dan Spiegle, Frank Springer, Mark Texeira, Alan Weiss, Al Williamson, Mary Wilshire, Dean Yeagle
- Inker: List: Ian Akin, Alfredo Alcala, Kyle Baker, Rick Bryant, John Buscema, Bob Camp, Vince Colletta, Ernie Colón, Tony DeZuniga, Brian Garvey, Carlos Garzon, Armando Gil, Dan Green, Richard Howell, Klaus Janson, Al Milgrom, Jim Mooney, Gray Morrow, Paul Neary, Rudy Nebres, Tom Palmer, Ralph Reese, Jacqueline Roettcher, Tony Salmons, Bill Sienkiewicz, Dan Spiegle, Frank Springer, Romeo Tanghal, John Tartaglione

Marvel Comics Super Special was a 41-issue series of one-shot comic-magazines published by American company Marvel Comics from 1977 to 1986. They were cover-priced $1.50 to $2.50, while regular color comics were priced 30 cents to 60 cents, Beginning with issue #5, the series' title in its postal indicia was shortened to Marvel Super Special. Covers featured the title or a variation, including Marvel Super Special, Marvel Super Special Magazine, and Marvel Weirdworld Super Special in small type, accompanied by large logos of its respective features.

These primarily included film and TV series adaptations, but also original and licensed Marvel characters, and music-related biographies and fictional adventures.

Issue #7 was withdrawn after completion, and never published in English. Issue #8 was published in two editorially identical editions, one magazine-sized, one tabloid-sized.

== Publication history ==
The premiere issue, dated simply 1977, featured the rock band Kiss in a 40-page story written by Steve Gerber, penciled by John Romita Jr., Alan Weiss, John Buscema, Rich Buckler, and Sal Buscema, which saw the quartet battling Marvel supervillains Mephisto and Doctor Doom. The members of the band had samples of their blood mixed into the ink used to print the first issue. Kiss reappeared in an occult adventure in issue #5 (1978). With that issue, the series' title in its postal indicia was shortened to Marvel Super Special.

Marvel's licensed pulp fiction character, Robert E. Howard's Conan the Barbarian, which was concurrently appearing in a long-running color comic book, starred in issues #2 (1977) and #9 (1978), with adaptations of the Arnold Schwarzenegger films Conan the Barbarian and Conan the Destroyer published as issues #21 (1982) and #35 (Dec. 1984), respectively. An adaptation of the film starring Marvel's original spin-off character, Red Sonja, appeared as issue #38 (1985). The other Marvel properties to be featured were the character Star-Lord in #10 (Winter 1979), the feature Weirdworld in #11-13 (Spring - Fall 1979), and Howard the Duck in #41 (Nov. 1986), the final issue.

Issue #3 featured an adaptation of Close Encounters of the Third Kind by writer Archie Goodwin and artists Walt Simonson and Klaus Janson. Simonson described working on the adaptation as "the worst experience of my comics career" due to the lack of visual reference and the inability of Marvel to obtain the likeness rights to the lead actors in the film. Except for a biography of The Beatles in issue #4 (1978), the remainder adapted fantasy, science fiction, and adventure films of the day, including Blade Runner, Dragonslayer, The Adventures of Buckaroo Banzai, and two Star Wars, two Indiana Jones, and two James Bond films, and such other films as Jaws 2 and the children's musical comedy The Muppets Take Manhattan.

The sole TV series adaptation was of Battlestar Galactica in issue #8 (1978), which was published in two editorially identical editions, one magazine-sized, one tabloid-sized. This special was partially redrawn and expanded into three issues when Battlestar Galactica became a monthly comic book series. The adaptations of Star Trek: The Motion Picture (issue #15) and Blade Runner (issue #22) were also reprinted in standard comic book format, the former also as the first few issues of a continuing series.

Each issue included text features and other additional material.

== Missing issue ==
A panel from the unpublished Sgt. Pepper's adaptation, art by George Pérez and Jim Mooney.

Marvel Super Special #7, an adaptation of the film Sgt. Pepper's Lonely Hearts Club Band, by writer David Anthony Kraft and artists George Pérez and Jim Mooney was promoted on the "Bullpen Bulletins" page in Marvel Comics cover-dated January 1979. It was never published in the U.S. "because the book was late and the movie proved to be a commercial failure", according to a contemporaneous news account, which added, without substantiation, that, "reportedly, Marvel's adaptation was published in Japan". A French translation was published by Arédit-Artima under two covers, one for the French market and one for the French-speaking Canadian market. A Dutch version with yet another different cover was published.

Penciler George Pérez, recalled that Marvel had

...nearly zero cooperation from the Robert Stigwood company [which produced the film] and we didn't realize that the [movie] script was still in so much flux that things we were putting in the comic were not going to appear in the movie and things we didn't know about were going to be added to the movie. The plot was so convoluted and cheesy — even on the printed page — and after a while we realized it was not really going anywhere. They said they were going to have all these superstars appear at the end of the film and, of course, in the end they couldn't get them — not that we could have used them anyway, because we didn't have the licenses to use their likenesses. Also, I was paired with a very incompatible inker because the book was running so late. I was doing a terrible job on it, Jim Mooney was a terrible fit for me — though he did the best he could — [and] it was just one disaster after another. It was one of the nadirs of my career. I was so grateful that the book never got an American release. I've yet to see a copy of Sgt. Pepper.

Pérez said Bob Larkin had done the cover art but the actual artist was Tom Palmer.

== The issues ==
Issue	Date	Contents	Notes
1	1977	Kiss	Original story by Steve Gerber, Alan Weiss, John Buscema, Rich Buckler, Sal Buscema, and Al Milgrom. 900,000 print run; sales of "roughly half a million".
2	1977	Savage Sword of Conan	Adaptation by Roy Thomas, John Buscema, and Alfredo Alcala of Robert E. Howard's Black Vulmea's Vengeance.
3	1978	Close Encounters of the Third Kind	Adaptation by Archie Goodwin, Walt Simonson, and Klaus Janson of the Columbia Pictures film directed by Steven Spielberg.
4	1978	The Beatles Story	Original story by David Anthony Kraft, George Pérez, and Klaus Janson.
5	1978	Kiss	Original story by Alan Weiss, Ralph Macchio, John Romita Jr., and Tony DeZuniga.
6	1978	Jaws 2	Adaptation by Rick Marschall, Gene Colan, and Tom Palmer of the Universal Studios film directed by Jeannot Szwarc.
7	unpublished	Sgt. Pepper's Lonely Hearts Club Band	Adaptation by David Anthony Kraft, George Pérez, and Jim Mooney of the Universal Studios film directed by Michael Schultz.
8	1978	Battlestar Galactica	Adaptation by Roger McKenzie and Ernie Colón of the pilot episode of the ABC television series created by Glen A. Larson.
9	1978	The Savage Sword of Conan	Adaptation by Roy Thomas, John Buscema, and Tony DeZuniga of Robert E. Howard and L. Sprague de Camp's "The Blood-Stained God".
10	Winter 1979	Star-Lord	Original story by Doug Moench, Gene Colan, and Tom Palmer.
11	Spring 1979	Weirdworld: "Warriors of the Shadow Realm"	Original story by Doug Moench, John Buscema, and Rudy Nebres.
12	Summer 1979	Weirdworld: "Warriors of the Shadow Realm"	Original story by Doug Moench, John Buscema, and Rudy Nebres.
13	Fall 1979	Weirdworld: "Warriors of the Shadow Realm"	Original story by Doug Moench, John Buscema, and Rudy Nebres.
14	1979	Meteor	Adaptation by Ralph Macchio, Gene Colan, and Tom Palmer of the American International Pictures film directed by Ronald Neame.
15	December 1979	Star Trek: The Motion Picture	Adaptation by Marv Wolfman, Dave Cockrum, and Klaus Janson of the Paramount Pictures film directed by Robert Wise.
16	Spring 1980	The Empire Strikes Back	Originally published in Marvel Special Edition Featuring Star Wars: The Empire Strikes Back. Adaptation by Archie Goodwin, Al Williamson, and Carlos Garzon of the Lucasfilm/20th Century Fox film directed by Irvin Kershner. Reprinted in Star Wars issues #39–44.
17	Summer 1980	Xanadu	Adaptation by J. M. DeMatteis, Rich Buckler, Jimmy Janes, Michael Netzer, Brent Anderson, Joe Brozowski, Al Milgrom, and Bill Sienkiewicz of the Universal Studios film directed by Robert Greenwald.
18	1981	Raiders of the Lost Ark	Adaptation by Walt Simonson, John Buscema, and Klaus Janson of the Lucasfilm/Paramount Pictures film directed by Steven Spielberg.
19	1981	For Your Eyes Only	Adaptation by Larry Hama, Howard Chaykin, and Vince Colletta of the Eon Productions/United Artists film directed by John Glen.
20	1981	Dragonslayer	Adaptation by Dennis O'Neil, Marie Severin, and John Tartaglione of the Paramount Pictures/Walt Disney Productions film directed by Matthew Robbins.
21	1982	Conan the Barbarian	Adaptation by Michael Fleisher and John Buscema of the Dino De Laurentiis Corporation/Universal Studios/20th Century Fox film directed by John Milius.
22	September 1982	Blade Runner	Adaptation by Archie Goodwin, Al Williamson, Carlos Garzon, Dan Green, and Ralph Reese of the Warner Bros. film directed by Ridley Scott.
23	Summer 1982	Annie	Adaptation by Tom DeFalco, Win Mortimer, and Vince Colletta of the Columbia Pictures film directed by John Huston.
24	February 1983	The Dark Crystal	Adaptation by David Anthony Kraft, Bret Blevins, Vince Colletta, Rick Bryant, and Richard Howell of the ITC Entertainment/Henson Associates/Universal Studios film directed by Jim Henson and Frank Oz.
25	1983	Rock & Rule	Adaptation by Bill Mantlo of the Nelvana Limited/CFDC/Famous Players/Canada Trust/MGM film directed by Clive A. Smith.
26	1983	Octopussy	Adaptation by Steve Moore and Paul Neary of the Eon Productions/MGM/UA Entertainment Company film directed by John Glen.
27	1983	Return of the Jedi	Adaptation by Archie Goodwin, Al Williamson, Carlos Garzon, Tom Palmer, and Ron Frenz of the Lucasfilm/20th Century Fox film directed by Richard Marquand. Later re-printed as a four–issue limited series.
28	1983	Krull	Adaptation by David Michelinie, Bret Blevins, and Vince Colletta of the Columbia Pictures film directed by Peter Yates.
29	1983	Tarzan of the Apes	Adaptation by Sharman DiVono, Mark Evanier, and Dan Spiegle of Edgar Rice Burroughs' Tarzan of the Apes.
30	1984	Indiana Jones and the Temple of Doom	Adaptation by David Michelinie, Jackson Guice, Ian Akin, Brian Garvey, and Bob Camp of the Lucasfilm/Paramount Pictures film directed by Steven Spielberg.
31	1984	The Last Starfighter	Adaptation by Bill Mantlo, Bret Blevins, and Tony Salmons of the Lorimar Productions/Universal Studios film directed by Nick Castle.
32	1984	The Muppets Take Manhattan	Adaptation by Stan Kay, Dean Yeagle, and Jacqueline Roettcher of the Henson Associates/TriStar Pictures film directed by Frank Oz.
33	1984	The Adventures of Buckaroo Banzai Across the 8th Dimension	Adaptation by Bill Mantlo, Mark Texeira, and Armando Gil of the Sherwood Productions/20th Century Fox film directed by W. D. Richter.
34	1984	Sheena	Adaptation by Cary Burkett and Gray Morrow of the Columbia Pictures film directed by John Guillermin.
35	December 1984	Conan the Destroyer	Adaptation by Michael Fleisher and John Buscema of the Dino De Laurentiis Corporation/Universal Studios film directed by Richard Fleischer.
36	1984	Dune	Adaptation by Ralph Macchio and Bill Sienkiewicz of the Dino De Laurentiis Corporation/Universal Studios film directed by David Lynch.
37	1984	2010: The Year We Make Contact	Adaptation by J. M. DeMatteis, Joe Barney, Larry Hama, and Tom Palmer of the MGM film directed by Peter Hyams.
38	1985	Red Sonja	Adaptation by Louise Simonson, Mary Wilshire, and Vince Colletta of the Dino De Laurentiis Company/MGM/UA Entertainment Company film directed by Richard Fleischer.
39	1985	Santa Claus: The Movie	Adaptation by Sid Jacobson and Frank Springer of the TriStar Pictures film directed by Jeannot Szwarc.
40	October 1986	Labyrinth	Adaptation by Sid Jacobson, John Buscema, and Romeo Tanghal of the Henson Associates/Lucasfilm/TriStar Pictures film directed by Jim Henson.
41	November 1986	Howard the Duck	Adaptation by Danny Fingeroth and Kyle Baker of the Lucasfilm/Universal Studios film directed by Willard Huyck.

== Collected editions ==
- Star-Lord: Guardian of the Galaxy includes Marvel Super Special #10, 424 pages, July 2014, ISBN 978-0785154495
- Weirdworld includes Marvel Super Special #11-13, 312 pages, April 2015, ISBN 978-0785162889
