= Ian Akin =

American comic book artist

- Born: July 28, 1959 (age 67) California
- Area: Inker

Ian Akin (born July 28, 1959, in California) is a comic book artist, known primarily for inking. Along with his inking partner, Brian Garvey, Akin worked on many superhero comics (mostly for Marvel Comics) from 1982 to 1988.

== Biography ==
Akin grew up in southern California, in Riverside County. At age 13, he and his mother and sister moved to San Francisco.

Akin's first professional job was producing artwork for Larry Fuller's New Funny Book in 1978. Around this time he met Brian Garvey, who shortly joined Akin's small, San Francisco-based studio.

=== Akin & Garvey ===
In 1982, Akin began his ten-year partnership with Garvey, inking for Marvel Comics on ROM Spaceknight #34 (Sept. 1982), over Sal Buscema's pencils. Akin and Garvey became the regular ROM inkers for almost two years, until 1984. During that time, they also provided the inks for the 1982 Marvel mini-series The Vision and the Scarlet Witch. In 1984, the pair inked the four-issue mini-series Starriors and issue four of the mini-series The Transformers for Marvel. The pair inked issues #190–209 of Iron Man, as well as three years working on The Transformers.

In the mid-1980s, the pair branched out, producing work for DC Comics, where they worked on comics including Firestorm (for five consecutive issues) and The Warlord; Pacific Comics; and Savage Graphics, while continuing to produce covers and interior art for Marvel. Akin and Garvey worked for Continuity Comics between 1986 and 1992, on titles including Megalith, Ms. Mystic and Samuree.

In the early 1990s, Akin (and Garvey) produced work for Disney Comics, on titles featuring Jessica Rabbit and The Little Mermaid, and others. The inking duo disbanded in 1992 to pursue separate projects.

In the early 2010s, Akin and Garvey reunited to do commercial illustration and comics work.

=== Solo work ===
Between 1994 and 1995, Akin produced covers for Disney Digest reprints, including for Darkwing Duck. He continued to produce work steadily for Marvel through the 1990s, notably as the regular inker on Marvel's Darkhawk from 1993 to 1995, and Professor Xavier and the X-Men from 1995 to 1997. He was a regular inker on the 1990s incarnation of What If..., but since the mid-1990s, Akin has no significant published credits.

== Select bibliography ==
=== Akin & Garvey ===
- Rom #34, 36–50 (Marvel)
- The Vision and the Scarlet Witch #1–4 (Marvel)
- Starriors #1-4 (Marvel)
- Firestorm #38–42 (DC)
- Iron Man #190–209 (Marvel)
- Transformers: Headmasters #1–4 (Marvel)
- The Transformers #19–30, 32, 35–37 (Marvel)

=== Solo ===
- Darkhawk #28–50 (Marvel)
- Professor Xavier and the X-Men #2, 5, 7, 8, 10–13, 15–18 (Marvel)

== Notes ==
Preceded by Joe Sinnott	ROM Spaceknight inker (with Brian Garvey); 1982–1984	Succeeded by Mel Candido
Preceded by Steve Mitchell	Iron Man inker (with Brian Garvey); 1985–1986	Succeeded by Sam DeLarosa
Preceded by Tom Morgan	Transformers inker (with Brian Garvey); 1986–1988	Succeeded by Dave Hunt
Preceded by Chris Ivy	Darkhawk inker 1993–1995	Succeeded by N/A
Preceded by Jesse Delperdang	Professor Xavier and the X-Men inker 1995–1997	Succeeded by N/A
