= Portia Prinz of the Glamazons =

American comic book series

- The cover to Portia Prinz of the Glamazons #5, art by Richard Howell

Publication information
- Publisher: Desperado-Eastern Press (1977–1979); Eclipse Comics (1986–1987)
- Schedule: Irregular; Bimonthly
- Format: Limited series
- Publication date: 1977 – October 1987
- No. of issues: 5 Desperado-Eastern Press; 6 (Eclipse Comics)

Creative team
- Created by: Richard Howell
- Written by: Richard Howell
- Artist(s): Richard Howell; Carmine Infantino
- Editor: Cat Yronwoode Eclipse Comics

Portia Prinz of the Glamazons is a creator-owned American fantasy parody comic book series created by Richard Howell. It was Howell's first comics work, and he originally self-published it underground via his own Desperado-Eastern label in 1977. Some ten years later the series was reprinted and then continued by Eclipse Comics between 1986 and 1987.

== Creation ==
Howell was inspired by both the title character of Jane Austen's Emma and the DC Comics heroine Wonder Woman, with the society of the Amazons from the latter a target for much of the series' satire. The series was subtitled "The World's Foremost Pseudo-Intellectual Super-Heroine". The series often included references and allusions to classical literature such as John Milton's Paradise Lost and Dante's Inferno.

== Publishing history ==
Between 1977 and 1979, Howell produced five issues of Portia Prinz, though his small press Desperado-Eastern had little reach beyond Boston. The storyline was described as a serialised graphic novel, though the work was initially left incomplete due to Howell's commitments as an editor for Irjax Enterprises. After breaking into mainstream comics in the early 1980s - including work for both DC and Marvel Comics - Howell looked at restarting the series with an independent publisher. His first attempt was cut short when an unnamed publisher insisted he increase the sex appeal of Portia.

The title came to the attention of Eclipse Comics publisher Dean Mullaney through coverage in fanzines and The Comics Journal. At the instigation of Mark Evanier, Howell reached a deal with Eclipse to reprint the series and publish a new conclusion, with their publishing model meaning Howell would retain complete creative control. The first issue of the Eclipse series featured an introduction by Elfquest creators Wendy and Richard Pini and a history of the Glamazon race by Howell. Eclipse ran the series in six bi-monthly issues, which finally printed the conclusion to the storyline. Carmine Infantino contributed pencils to a short back-up story in the third issue of the series. Howell stated he was thankful to Eclipse for the chance to finish the series.

Since the end of the series, Portia has made cameo appearances in Mistress of the Dark #39 (July 1996) and Soulsearchers and Company #65 (March 2004), both published by Howell's Claypool Comics.

== Plot ==
Portia Prinz is the egotistical princess of the Glamazons, a society of beautiful immortals living on a secluded island since 500 B.C., who have access to time-travel technology. While the island has male and female residents, the latter live longer, are more powerful and have a far greater say in society; both genders are also allowed to travel to and from the island as they please, and frequently breed with mortals after the Glamazons blackmail their goddess Afrodite into letting them do so. Portia's mother, Queen Helene, rules the island with her consort Elbert Prinz. While the Queen has two sons - Pyotr and Poliphar - it is Portia who is next in line for the throne.

Sadly, Portia is often bone-idle and bored; when she does so something it tends to involve meddling in the affairs of others. Sometimes this has positive effects on Glamazon society (though usually only as a side-effect unforeseen by Portia), but more often it causes problems for those she planned to help - including her permanently startled consort Nathaniel. Despite this both Portia and the rest of the Glamazons have a very high opinion of her skill and intelligence.

== Reception ==
In their introduction to the Eclipse series, Wendy and Richard Pini praised the series' humour, wit, humanity and characterisation, while Mark Evanier referred to it as " a unique and altogether delightful and personal vision" in his afterword. Don Thompson graded the series A in a review for Comic Buyer's Guide, calling it "a sheer delight". In an overview of the series, Margaret O'Connell noted the Glamazons were ethnically diverse long before the Amazons in Wonder Woman, noting the black goddess Afrodite. She also drew comparisons between the title's humor and that of British television series The Avengers, a known favorite of Howell's, and the dense dialogue. In Amazing Heroes, Bob Hughes also commented on the title's wordiness, calling it "perhaps the ultimate talking head comic".
