= Brian Garvey =

Brian Garvey may refer to:

- Brian Garvey (comics) (born 1961), comic book artist
- Brian Garvey (footballer) (1937–2026), English footballer
