= X-Men: The Hidden Years =

Comic book series

- Cover art for X-Men: The Hidden Years #1

Publication information
- Publisher: Marvel Comics
- Schedule: Monthly
- Format: Ongoing series
- Publication date: December 1999 – September 2001
- No. of issues: 22
- Main character: X-Men

Creative team
- Written by: John Byrne
- Penciller: John Byrne
- Inker: Tom Palmer
- Letterer: John Byrne
- Colorist: Gregory Wright
- Editor(s): Bob Harras; Jason Liebig; Lysa Hawkins; Joe Quesada

X-Men: The Hidden Years is a comic book series published by Marvel Comics, which starred the company's popular superhero team, the X-Men. It was written by John Byrne, with illustrations by Byrne and Tom Palmer.

== Publication history ==
The series was intended to fill in the team's chronology during the early 1970s, when the original X-Men comic (#67–93) was publishing only reprints of earlier issues. According to Byrne, the series "was clearly finite, since [Giant-Size X-Men #1] was out there as an "end point" for my series, but the way I had it worked out, I could have easily done 100 issues or more before I had to send the team off to Krakoa." However, as part of a retooling of the X-Men line, X-Men: The Hidden Years was cancelled, prematurely ending its run with issue #22.

Hidden Years featured the cast of the original X-Men and their villains, with a few appearances by characters who had not otherwise appeared at that point in time, such as Storm and the Phoenix Force.

== See also ==
- Untold Tales of Spider-Man
- X-Men: First Class
- Professor Xavier and the X-Men
- All-New X-Men

== Bibliography ==
- X-Men #94 (November 1999) (10 page story set between UXM #66 and THY #1)
- X-Men: The Hidden Years #1-22 (December, 1999 – September, 2001)
- X-Men: The Hidden Years - The Ghost and the Darkness (contains X-Men: The Hidden Years #1-7) ISBN 1-84653-155-1
- X-Men: The Hidden Years - Volume One (contains X-Men: The Hidden Years #01-12 and excerpts from X-Men #94) ISBN 9780785159698
- X-Men: The Hidden Years - Volume Two (contains X-Men: The Hidden Years #13-22) ISBN 9780785159698
- X-Men: The Hidden Years Omnibus (January 2024) (contains X-MEN: THE HIDDEN YEARS #1-22, FANTASTIC FOUR (1961) #102-104, and material from X-MEN (1991) #94 and AMAZING ADULT FANTASY #14.) ISBN 1302950215 640 pages
