= Richard Howell (comics) =

American comics artist

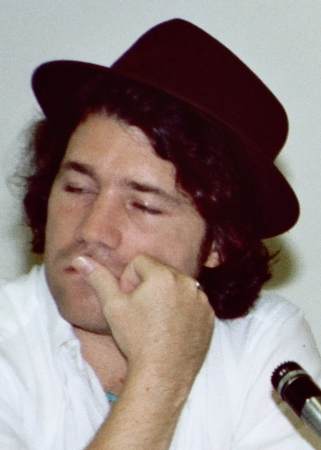
- Richard Howell at the 1982 San Diego Comic-Con
- Born: November 16, 1955 (age 71)
- Areas: Writer, Penciller, Inker, Editor, Letterer, Colourist
- Notable works: Claypool Comics; Hawkman; The Vision and the Scarlet Witch

Richard Howell (born November 16, 1955) is an American comics artist best known as the co-founder and editor of Claypool Comics.

== Career ==
Richard Howell entered the comics industry in 1977 with his self-published series Portia Prinz of the Glamazons.

Beginning in 1980, he and his partner Carol Kalish co-edited the New Media/Irjax line of magazines. They also ran the New Media/Irjax-owned Boston-area distributor Solar Spice and Liquors, named after a fictional corporation created by science fiction writer Poul Anderson. Howell replaced Peter B. Gillis as editorial director of New Media/Irjax in June 1981.

Howell began working for Marvel Comics in 1982 and DC Comics in 1983. Writer Tony Isabella and Howell produced The Shadow War of Hawkman limited series in 1985 and an ongoing Hawkman series the following year. Howell and writer Steve Englehart crafted a twelve-issue The Vision and the Scarlet Witch limited series in 1985-1986, wherein the Scarlet Witch became pregnant.

With co-editor Jesse Reyes, he relaunched the Vampirella character at Harris Comics and co-founded Claypool Comics with Ed Via in 1993. Howell served as editor of Claypool's line throughout its existence.

Claypool announced in July 2006 that the print end of its published line would cease, as Diamond Comic Distributors, the industry's major distribution arm, would no longer carry it. Deadbeats continues as a webcomic at the Claypool Comics website.

== Personal life ==
Howell and Carol Kalish were longtime residents of Leonia, New Jersey.

== Bibliography ==
=== Claypool Comics ===
- Deadbeats #1–82 (1993–2007)
- Elvira, Mistress of the Dark #1–166 (1993–2007)
- Phantom of Fear City #1–12 (1993–1995)
- Soulsearchers and Company #1–82 (1993–2007)

=== Comico ===
- Jonny Quest Special #1–2 (1988)

=== DC Comics ===
- Action Comics Weekly #615–620 (1988)
- All-Star Squadron #27–28, 30, 36–37, 40, 57, Annual #3 (1983–1986)
- Blackhawk #268, 273 (1984)
- DC Comics Presents #95 (1986)
- Firestorm the Nuclear Man #68 (1988)
- Green Lantern vol. 2 #162 (1983)
- Hawkman vol. 2 #1–16, Special #1 (1986–1987)
- The Shadow War of Hawkman #1–4 (1985)
- Superman #661 (2007)
- Who's Who in the Legion of Super-Heroes #3–5 (1988)
- Who's Who: The Definitive Directory of the DC Universe #5, 10, 14, 23 (1985–1987)
- Who's Who: Update '87 #2–3, 5 (1987)

=== Desperado-Eastern Press ===
- Portia Prinz of the Glamazons #1–5 (1977–1978)

=== Dynamite Entertainment ===
- Vampirella Masters Series #5 (2011)

=== Eclipse Comics ===
- Alien Encounters #7 (1986)
- The DNAgents #15, 17–19, 22 (1984–1985)
- The Liberty Project #6 (1987)
- Merchants of Death #3–4 (1988)
- New DNAgents #11 (1986)
- Portia Prinz of the Glamazons #1–6 (1986–1987)
- Surge #2 (1984)
- Three Dimensional DNAgents #1 (1986)

=== Harris Comics ===
- Creepy 1993 Fearbook (1993)
- Vampirella's Summer Nights (1992)
- Vampirella: Morning in America #3 (1991)

=== Marvel Comics ===
- Avengers 2000 (2000)
- Avengers Annual #19 (1990)
- Conan the Barbarian #145 (1983)
- The Further Adventures of Indiana Jones #3 (1983)
- Hero: Warrior of the Mystic Realms #5–6 (1990)
- Inhumans Special #1 (1990)
- Iron Man Annual #11 (1990)
- Marvel Comics Presents #18, 52, 60–63 (1989–1990)
- Marvel Fanfare #54-55, 59 (1990–1991)
- Marvel Super Special #24 (The Dark Crystal) (1982)
- Moon Knight #34 (1983)
- Official Handbook of the Marvel Universe #5 (1983)
- Official Handbook of the Marvel Universe Deluxe Edition #6 (1986)
- Open Space #4 (1990)
- Power Man and Iron Fist #102, 105 (1984)
- The Vision and the Scarlet Witch vol. 2 #1–12 (1985–1986)
- Web of Spider-Man #46 (1989)
- What If...? vol. 2 #17 (1990)
- What The--?! #3, 6–7, 17 (1988–1992)
- Wolverine: Global Jeopardy #1 (1993)

=== Welsh Publishing ===
- The Adventures of Jell-O Man and Wobbly #1 (1991)
