= The Vision and the Scarlet Witch =

American comic book series

- The Vision and the Scarlet Witch vol. 2 #1 (October 1985). Art by Richard Howell.

Publication information
- Publisher: Marvel Comics
- Schedule: Monthly
- Format: (vol. 1 & 3): Limited series (vol. 2): ongoing series
- Genre: Superhero; Magic
- Publication date: (vol. 1): November 1982 – February 1983 (vol. 2): October 1985 – September 1986 (vol. 3): July – November 2025
- No. of issues: (vol. 1): 4 (vol. 2): 12 (vol. 3): 5
- Main character(s): Scarlet Witch; Vision

Creative team
- Written by: List: (vol. 1): Bill Mantlo (vol. 2): Steve Englehart (vol. 3): Steve Orlando
- Penciller: List: (vol. 1): Rick Leonardi (vol. 2): Richard Howell (vol. 3): Lorenzo Tammetta Jacopo Camagni
- Inker: List: (vol. 1): Ian Akin Brian Garvey (vol. 2): Andy Mushynsky Jim Mooney Jack Abel Mike Esposito Frank Springer (vol. 3): Lorenzo Tammetta Jacopo Camagni
- Editor: List: (vol. 1): Mark Gruenwald (vol. 2): Jim Salicrup (vol. 3): Alanna Smith

Collected editions
- The Saga Of Wanda And Vision: ISBN 978-1302928643
- Fear the Reaper: ISBN 9781302964955

The Vision and the Scarlet Witch is a series of comic books published by Marvel Comics. The comic features the Vision and Scarlet Witch, a couple and longtime members of the Avengers.

== Publication history ==
=== Volume 1 ===
Their first key series together was published in the beginning of November 1982 which contained four issues. The limited series was written by Bill Mantlo and pencilled by Rick Leonardi. In this series, the villain Magneto is retconned as the father of Scarlet Witch and Quicksilver while intending to give up his villainous ways of life. The reveal had some previous clues which were released during Avengers and X-Men titles. This stayed as comic book canon for many decades until it was undone in the 2014 crossover storyline AXIS.

=== Volume 2 ===
The second series, which lasted twelve issues, was published in 1985 and was written by Steve Englehart. In this series, Scarlet Witch becomes pregnant magically and has two sons, William and Thomas. Englehart tried to keep the series self-contained and made the characters resign from the Avengers. He also omitted the theme of racism towards mutants, considering that it was already dealt with in the X-Men titles. The series was focused on family drama rather than superhero exploits. Magic was also a common topic but was toned down in comparison with Englehart's run on Doctor Strange. Englehart lamented that Scarlet Witch's motherhood did not stick, as the children were killed shortly after he ended writing the character. The children were later retconned to be alive and joined Young Avengers as Wiccan and Speed.

=== Volume 3 ===
The third series, which lasted five issues, was published in 2025 and was written by Steve Orlando. In this series, Grim Reaper is resurrected with new powers and begins creating "Death's Doors" that lure in people who've lost loved ones, prompting the Scarlet Witch and Vision to investigate. Vision is fatally wounded by Grim Reaper, prompting Wanda to use her enhanced powers to revive him in his white form. Determining that Grim Reaper has once again made a pact with a Great Old One, Scarlet Witch and Vision venture through a Death's Door and are led through a series of traps by an apparition of Vision's deceased son Vin. Defeating Grim Reaper, they discover that his benefactor is Gargantos, who devours him as punishment for his failure. Vision and Scarlet Witch use their new powers to save Grim Reaper and wound Gargantos, who is attacked and dragged away by other Great Old Ones. After rekindling their romance, Vision is restored to his original form and returns home while Wanda traps Grim Reaper in a magical prison.

== Reception ==
Diamond Comic Distributors reported that the Avengers: Vision and the Scarlet Witch trade paperback was the 162nd best-selling graphic novel in June 2010.

Max Nason of Comic Book Resources stated that "it has to be this classic title series for one of Marvel’s most complex couples", noting that the two-volume series is "essential" for anyone preparing to watch WandaVision (2021). He noted that these series "expand and explore" the relationship between Wanda and Vision following their wedding in Giant-Size Avengers #4. Nason found both volumes important for understanding the characters as individuals and as a married couple, and also noted that the two volumes contain what he described as "Wanda Maximoff’s most notable storylines", including her relationship with her then-father Magneto (Note: In The Vision and the Scarlet Witch #4 (1982), Magneto was established as the biological father of the twins, Wanda and her brother Pietro. However, this was later retconned in Avengers & X-Men: Axis (2014), particularly in Uncanny Avengers #4 (2015), which revealed that the twins are neither Magneto’s children nor mutants. Following the events of Age of X-Man (2019) and beginning with S.W.O.R.D. #6 (2020), Magneto is shown to regard the twins as his children, despite not being biologically related.) as well as the character’s "journey into motherhood". Similarly, Darby Harn of Screen Rant described The Vision and the Scarlet Witch (Vol. 2) #12 as "one of the most important issues in the history of the Scarlet Witch", noting the significance of the issue in which she gives birth to Billy and Tommy and then retires from the Avengers to live a normal life in the suburbs. He noted that this issue had a major influence on the storyline of WandaVision.

== Collected editions ==
Title	Material collected	Pages	Publication date	ISBN
Avengers: Vision and the Scarlet Witch	Giant-Size Avengers #4 and The Vision and the Scarlet Witch #1–4	128	May 2015	978-0785197416
Avengers: Vision & The Scarlet Witch - A Year in the Life	The Vision and the Scarlet Witch vol. 2 #1–12	344	June 2010	978-0785145080
Vision & The Scarlet Witch: The Saga Of Wanda And Vision	Giant-Size Avengers #4, The Vision and the Scarlet Witch (1982) #1-4, The Vision and the Scarlet Witch (1985) #1-12 and West Coast Avengers (1985) #2	472	January 2021	978-1302928643
Marvel Masterworks Presents The Avengers Vol. 21	The Avengers #217-226, Annual #11, The Vision and The Scarlet Witch #1-4 and material from Marvel Fanfare #3, introduction by Jim Salicrup	392	August 2021	978-1302929350
Marvel Masterworks Presents The Vision and the Scarlet Witch Vol. 1	The Vision and the Scarlet Witch #1-12, West Coast Avengers #2, Marvel Super-Heroes (1990) #10, Marvel Fanfare #6, #14, #32, #48 and #58, Solo Avengers #5, What the--?! #3, introduction by Jim Salicrup	488	March 2025	978-1302962210
The Vision & The Scarlet Witch: Fear the Reaper	The Vision & The Scarlet Witch (Vol. 3) #1-5	120	January 2026	9781302964955

== See also ==
- WandaVision – an American television miniseries based on the Marvel Comics characters Scarlet Witch and Vision.
