= Starriors =

Toy line

Zoids: Starriors, also referred to as Zoids: R.A.T.S. (Robot Anti-Terror Squad), was a robot toyline created by Tomy in association with Marvel Comics in 1984. It was a sub-line from Zoids, but had a new, different storyline. Six Marvel mini-comics were distributed with the toys. Marvel also produced a four-issue limited series written by Louise Simonson, with art by Michael Chen, Ian Akin, and Brian Garvey, and covers painted by Bill Sienkiewicz. The toys were not commercially successful. After the initial wave, there were only eight more toys produced, and only two additional minicomics. Consumer Reports' Penny Power, when it reviewed robot toys in late 1984, found Starriors the "least-appealing robots in the group".

== Background Story ==
In the future, solar flares threaten all life on Earth. Its scientists build three classes of intelligent robots known as Starriors, which are Protectors, to restore Earth for human use, Destructors, to ward off any potential alien invasions, and Guardians, to protect humanity after they go into a state of hibernation underground and have their essences transferred into the machines. The brains of the Starriors, called control circuits, are crafted in Man's image as androids. The leader of the Destructors, Slaughter Steelgrave, becomes craven at the thought of deactivation upon the restoration of the humans and enslaves the Protectors after what he believes to be a successful attempt to destroy all of the Guardians. Eventually, the human race and the Starriors' mission is forgotten as a reality and regarded as a myth - none of the Starriors had been activated when the humans disappeared. Then the Protector Trashor, Nipper, discovers a human skull. A band of Protectors, eventually joined by a few dutiful Destructors, sets out to release the humans from their overly prolonged hibernation.

== Terminology ==
Each Starrior has a Class and a Series, while several of them have a Model. As the Starriors lived on, and their intellect advanced, they developed more defined personality traits and most took on mental gender characteristics, though with the exception of Geo, a non-toy character exclusive to the comics, their body designs were genderless.

=== Class ===
- Blue Protector — Originally programmed to rebuild civilization so that structures, facilities, and ecologies would be established and ready for use upon Man's return. The Protectors were forced into the role of a slave caste by Slaughter Steelgrave, and set to the task of fortifying his city and/or menial labor. An underground resistance formed, meeting in secret, though due to their core programming making it difficult to turn their weaponry/tools upon any other Starrior, their resistance actions mostly ran along the lines of repairing or restoring Protectors that had been physically "punished" by their Destructor masters. Their dominant colors are often blue, white or light beige and silver.
- Red Destructor — Originally programmed to defend the works designed and built by the Protectors, and to eliminate the mutant animal lifeforms expected to develop on the Earth's surface during the interim years of high radiation which Man put themselves into suspended animation to avoid. Under the leadership of Slaughter Steelgrave, the Destructors were forged into a militaristic ruling caste, lording over the Protectors despite their one lack of programming to create the fortress-like city which they depended on their slaves for. Their dominant colors are often red, black and gold.
- Blue Guardian — Programmed to defend the slumbering Man, especially from their rivals known as the Red Mutants. Slaughter Steelgrave erased all memory of Man's true location, deactivated the timing system that was to awaken Man, and set about the eradication of all Guardians, believing he was successful. One of the remaining two, however, managed to survive, as well as the Armored Battle Station under which Man was actually located.

=== Series ===
- Wastor — The humanoid series of Starrier. Roughly the same height as an adult human, though somewhat bulkier. All Wastors have a model, most with their main weapon/tool dominating the front of their torso, but some with an enlarged right arm containing the mechanism. Their control circuits are visible through a facial dome. Wastors with their weapon/tool in their chest have a cruder form of pincer-type manipulator as the hand on one arm, while the other arm ends in a secondary weapon/tool nozzle of unspecified use. Wastors with a primary arm module have their opposite arm equipped with a fully articulated hand with four fingers and an opposable thumb. In the toy line, Wastors made up slightly less than half of the line, however, in the comic series, the Wastors seemed to make up at least 90% of the entire Starrier population. Wastors are found as both Protectors and Destructors, though flashbacks indicate they were plentiful as Guardians in the distant past.
- Rammor — This series is bulky and vehicular-like. Rammors do not have Models. Rammors are about the same mass as Wastors, though do not stand as tall, due to their body style. They typically have three or four wheels and a pair of crude manipulators in either a three-fingered thumbless style or a pincer style. A Rammor's control circuit can be seen through a canopy dome on their body. They often, though not always, sport one or two weapon/tool parts. Rammors are found in small numbers among the Protectors, Destructors, and Guardians.
- Trashor — This series has smaller vehicular bodies. Trashors do not have Models. All are four-wheeled, and have only a single combination manipulator/head. The control circuit of a Trashor is not visible, though damage to one in the comic has shown they are located within their heads. Trashors are seen in both the Protector and Destructor ranks in small numbers similar to the Rammors. It is unknown if any Guardian Trashors ever existed, but above average supposition for their original existence can be found in the fact that the Armored Battle Station has a side launch bay specifically for Trashors.
- Strazor — Strazors are larger four-legged Starriors with a long neck and tail, and two in-line wheels on the underside of their body. They can fold into a transport mode for faster travel. They have a head much like a Wastor, and a similarly visible control circuit. They do not have models. Strazors have only been seen as Protectors, though one is able to be "disguised" as a Destructor during the course of the comic series, so it is probable that Destructor Strazors do exist.
- Starrunner — A bird-like Starrior that is able to transform from a winged ostrich-like shape into a jet aircraft. Their control circuits are located behind a cockpit-like dome on their jet mode nose-cones. It is possible that their alternative form is their model, as unlike most things in the toyline and comic, it is a named weapon. Starrunners have only been seen as Destructors.
- Cosmittor — This is a very large upright dinosaur-like Starrior. They have an assortment of unspecified weapon modules, as well as a primary weapon that is likely their model. Committers have only been seen as Destructors.
- Scout — Not an official named Series. "Scout" is the only thing that a Cosmittor's smaller partner is known as. As only one Cosmittor and one scout are seen in the comic or toy line, scouts are only seen as Destructors. In the toy form, the scout is the remote control for the motorized Cosmittor toy, but rather than simply being a control, it is also a character itself.
- Vultor — A large pterodactyl-like-like avian Starrior with an assortment of unspecified weapon/tools. Vultors are able to be ridden by Wastors. They do not have Models. Vultures are only seen as Protectors.
- Stalkor — A large four-legged dinosaur-like Starrior that most resembles a triceratops. It has an assortment of unspecified weapons, as well as an actual named central weapon, likely meaning it has a model. Stalkors, like Voltors, can be ridden by a Wastor. Stalkors are only seen as Destructors.
- Armored Battle Station — A large fortress Starrior beneath which Man sleeps. We see in the toyline that the Armored Battle Station in fact has three control circuits, two located in weapons modules, and one permanently affixed within a dome on the playset's interior. In the comic, the Armored Battle Station is treated just as if it is another character, and it has a fully developed emotional AI, though it is not specifically said to be a Starrior, it is certainly at least extremely like one. The Battlestation's AI continues to speak through the LazerRam when it is detached, meaning it may contain a fourth control circuit by IC definition.

Of additional note, the toyline also sold a package of Transfer Rings, plastic rings that contained Starrior heads and weaponry. Both a Protector-themed and Destructor-themed Transfer Ring were sold together and was the least expensive Starriors toy. They could fit over most Wastors' forearms, and their narrative function was to transfer a Starrior's mind into a new body if their old one became incapacitated, as happened to a number of the characters in the comics series.

== Characters ==
=== Those loyal to Man, and the ideal of living in harmony with humanity ===
Character	Class	Series	Model	Gender	Brief
Crank	Protector	Wastor	Speed Drill	Male	Slow-witted and gentle, with a heart as big as he is
Cut-Up	Protector	Wastor	Chainsaw	Male	Volatile, wants to be able to turn his chest saw on his enemies
Hotshot	Protector	Wastor	Duo-Laser	Male	Leader of the Protectors on the quest for Man
Lazerram	Guardian	Armored Battle Station	Citadel of Dreams	Male	The fortress beneath which Man sleeps
Motormouth	Protector	Rammor	n/a	Male	Messenger, talks far too much
Nipper	Protector	Trashor	n/a	Female	Amnesiac, with a genius for scavenging
Runabout	Protector	Strazor	n/a	Female	Imaginative, timid, shape-changing all-terrain transport
Stinger	Guardian	Scout	n/a	Male	One of the last of the Guardians
Thinktank	Protector	Rammor	n/a	Male	Wise and ancient, Hotshot's advisor
Tinker	Protector	Trashor	n/a	Male	Enterprising, the perfect repair assistant

=== Those loyal to Slaughter Steelgrave, and the ideal of Destructor dominion over the Earth ===
Character	Class	Series	Model	Gender	Brief
Auntie Tank	Destructor	Rammor	n/a	Female	Heavily armored, high-speed search-and-destroy
Backfire	Destructor	Rammor	n/a	Male	Unlucky, efforts to help always backfire
Cricket	Mutant	Scout	n/a	Male	Deadeye's excitable deaf-mute scout
Deadeye	Mutant	Cosmittor	Demolishor	Male	Blind killer with the soul of a poet
Gouge	Destructor	Wastor	Spiked Ream	Male	Sadistic, ill-tempered, uses his ream for destruction
Grub	Destructor	Trashor	n/a	Male	Lazy scavenger
Sawtooth	Destructor	Wastor	Buzzsaw	Male	Stolid, sometimes sympathetic to the Protectors
Scrapper	Destructor	Trashor	n/a	Male	Gung-ho, would rather fight than work
Slaughter Steelgrave	Destructor	Wastor	Vibro-Chisel	Male	Tyrannical leader of the Destructors
Speedtrap	Destructor	Starrunner	Sky Fighter	Female	Erratic, dangerloving high-speed shapeshifter

=== The second series, did not appear in the comics, allegiance not definite ===
Character	Class	Series	Model	Gender	Brief
Bolar	Destructor	Wastor	Thrash Whip	Male	A formidable warrior in search of the perfect opponent
Clawgut	Destructor	Wastor	Pincer	Male	Spiteful and cowardly, quick to instigate trouble for others
Flashfist	Protector	Wastor	Pulsar Laser	Male	A battery in Wastor form, uses his enemies' own energies against them
Ripsaw	Protector	Wastor	Blade Shield	Male	On a quest for truth, fights only to protect others
Slice	Destructor	Wastor	Double Axe	Male	Strict spoilsport, loves inflicting punishment on his enemies
Twinblade	Protector	Wastor	Cross Saw	Male	Brilliant artist, loves his own work more than the Protectors' cause
Twinhorn	Destructor	Stalkor	Laser Tongue	Male	Enforces all Destructor regulations, supports any Destructor that uses it for travel
Windstorm	Protector	Vultor	n/a	Female	High-speed and airborne, she is a useful spy vehicle and a hopeless snitch

== Comics ==
- Mini-comics

1. Deadeye
2. The Forest
3. Honor
4. The Trap
5. The Wall
6. Bolar!

- Books with audio (they continue the story from the Mini-comics, with some direct references to events)

Odyssey I. Tunnel of Doom
Odyssey II. Escape to Freedom

- Full-sized Comics

1. Discovery
2. Under Fire
3. Assault!
4. Quest's End!

The Protector band sets off, pursued by the Destructors. Throughout the series, the Protectors have several disadvantages to overcome. They are programmed for non-violence. Until they are able to override that programming, they cannot use their tools as weapons even if they want to. Since they are not designed for combat, they have little armor and only a few, such as the leader Hot Shot, are fitted with cutting lasers. Most have tools that are not very useful as weapons. Finally, Slaughter Steelgrave brings with him Deadeye, a Cosmittor. Deadeye is a huge tyrannosaurus rex-style robot who fires explosive discs from his mouth. Designed to destroy the largest and most powerful mutant monsters on the planet, Deadeye is far larger than any Protector, immune to their attacks, and capable of killing large numbers in a single assault. His presence means the Protectors must flee constantly. It is not until they find the Guardian, Stinger, and the Armored Battle Station under which Man sleeps, that those who search for Man gain enough firepower to mount a real defense against their enemies.

The mini-comics did not muddle who the good guys and bad guys were, unlike the comics, where the functions the Starriors were built for meant little to where their loyalties lay. Most notably in the cases of Sawtooth, who had always been sympathetic to the Protectors, and Auntie Tank, who questioned her loyalties throughout the mini-series before finally siding with the Protectors, too. The Protector Motormouth was revealed to be a spy for Slaughter Steelgrave as well. When the first human is released, it is decided that the Starriors retain their own identity and remain active amongst the humans. However, Slaughter Steelgrave remains to be reasoned with.

== Animation ==
There is much speculation about the existence of Starriors animated material. A 1984 trade advertisement released by Tomy stated that there was currently a Starriors television miniseries titled "Starriors Odyssey" in production to air in the spring and fall of 1985.

== Uses of the molds in other toylines ==
The Runabout and Speedtrap toys were originally developed for the Zoids line, but they were released as Starriors instead. As a result, the toys have a number of stylistic links to the early Zoids, such as the Bigasaur, as well as sharing similar labels and even carrying Helic Republic insignias.

Many Starriors figures and vehicles were recolored and released by Tomy in Europe under the name R.A.T.S..

The molds for Runabout and Speedtrap were reused and released in at least three-color variations each, for the small Japanese toyline Transforming Machine Beast Starriors (変幻機械獣スタリアス Hengen Kikaijū Sutariasu).
