= Claypool Comics =

Defunct American comic book publishing company

- Founded: 1993
- Defunct: 2006
- Headquarters: Leonia, New Jersey, United States
- Website: http://www.claypoolcomics.com/

Claypool Comics is an American comic book publishing company that was founded in 1993, known for publishing such titles as Peter David's Soulsearchers and Company and Elvira, Mistress of the Dark comics, as well as Richard Howell's Deadbeats and, (with Steve Englehart), Phantom of Fear City. Ed Via is Claypool's publisher and editor-in-chief, while Richard Howell serves as editor.

The company published 336 issues in total. Deadbeats ran 82 issues, as did Soulsearchers and Company, with three Deadbeats trade paperback collections and two for Soulsearchers. Elvira ran for 166 issues, with two trade paperback collections. There were 12 issues of Phantom of Fear City. There was also a Free Comic Book Day flip-book which was half Deadbeats and half Soulsearchers.

In July 2006, Claypool announced that the print end of its published line would cease, as Diamond Comic Distributors, the industry's major distribution arm, would no longer carry it.

Deadbeats made the shift to Internet publication in April 2007, appearing on the Claypool Comics website with new episodes every Monday, Wednesday, and Friday.
