= Brad Joyce =

British engineer

- Born: Bradley Joyce; 19 May 1970 (age 55); Cleethorpes, United Kingdom
- Citizenship: British
- Employer: Van Amersfoort Racing
- Title: Team Principal

Bradley Joyce (born 19 May 1970) is a British Formula One and motorsport engineer and executive. He is currently the Team Principal at Van Amersfoort Racing.

== Career ==
Joyce began his motorsport career while studying, competing in karting and saloon car racing before moving into engineering roles within the sport in the early 1990s. He initially worked as a race engineer across a variety of championships, including the British Touring Car Championship, where he worked with West Surrey Racing and later with Prodrive, engineering Rickard Rydell during his time in the Ford BTCC programme.

He then worked in the Formula 3000 Championship with the Nordic Racing team, where he engineered the team to the 2001 championship title. Joyce later joined Carlin Motorsport, working as a Race Engineer in the World Series Formula V8 3.5, where he engineered Tiago Monteiro to second in the championship. Joyce reunited with Monteiro when he moved to Jordan Grand Prix for 2005 as a race engineer, and remained with the Portuguese driver as the Silverstone outfit transitioned into Midland F1 Racing for 2006.

After Monteiro’s departure, Joyce began working with Adrian Sutil in 2007, following the team’s rebrand as Spyker F1. This partnership continued after the team changed its name again to Force India F1 Team, lasting five seasons from 2007 to 2011. For the 2012 season, Joyce engineered Nico Hülkenberg, with the German driver narrowly missing victory at the 2012 Brazilian Grand Prix. Joyce was reunited with Sutil for the 2013 season, before once again working with Hülkenberg between 2014 and 2016. In 2017 and 2018, Joyce was partnered with Esteban Ocon. He then worked with Lance Stroll during the 2019 and 2020 seasons and the first part of the 2021 season, before being promoted to Head of Trackside Engineering.

Joyce left the team at the end of the 2024 season and subsequently joined Van Amersfoort Racing as Team Principal. In this role, he leads the Dutch outfit across the FIA Formula 2 Championship, FIA Formula 3 Championship and other junior single-seater categories.
