= Brian Garvey (comics) =

- Born: September 19, 1961 (age 65)
- Areas: Artist, Inker

Brian Garvey (born September 18, 1961) is a comic book artist, known primarily for inking. Along with his inking partner, Ian Akin, Garvey worked on many superhero comics (mostly for Marvel Comics) from 1982–1988.

== Biography ==
Garvey met Akin in San Francisco in the late 1970s, through the community around Gary Arlington's San Francisco Comic Book Company. Joining Akin's small studio, the pair began working together. Their first professional job was on ROM Spaceknight #34 (Sept. 1982), inking over Sal Buscema's pencils. Akin and Garvey became the regular ROM inkers for almost two years, until 1984. During that time, they also provided the inks for the 1982 Marvel mini-series The Vision and the Scarlet Witch. Also in 1984, the pair inked the four-issue mini-series Starriors for Marvel. Moving over to DC Comics in 1985, the inking team worked on Firestorm for five consecutive issues. Back at Marvel, Akin and Garvey inked issues #190–209 of Iron Man, and then worked on The Transformers for two years, until 1988. For the next three years, Akin and Garvey worked sporadically, for clients ranging from Marvel to DC to Continuity Comics.

As a solo freelancer, Garvey worked steadily through the 1990s, for DC, Marvel, and Dark Horse Comics; most notably as the inker on the entire run of DC's Gunfire from 1994–1995, and inker for DC's The New Gods in 1995–1996. Since the 1990s, Garvey has no significant published comics credits.

From 1998 to 2002, Garvey worked with DreamWorks Animation on such films as The Prince of Egypt, The Road to El Dorado, and Spirit: Stallion of the Cimarron.

In the early 2010s, Akin and Garvey reunited to do commercial illustration and comics work.

== Bibliography ==
=== Akin & Garvey ===
- Rom #34, 36–50 (Marvel)
- The Vision and the Scarlet Witch #1–4 (Marvel)
- Starriors #1-4 (Marvel)
- Firestorm #38–42 (DC)
- Iron Man #190–209 (Marvel)
- Transformers: Headmasters #1–4 (Marvel)
- The Transformers #19–30, 32, 35–37 (Marvel)

=== Solo ===
- Gunfire #1–13 (DC)
- The New Gods #1–6, 8, 10, 11 (DC)

== Notes ==
Preceded by Joe Sinnott	ROM Spaceknight inker (with Ian Akin); 1982–1984	Succeeded by Mel Candido
Preceded by Steve Mitchell	Iron Man inker (with Ian Akin); 1985–1986	Succeeded by Sam DeLarosa
Preceded by Tom Morgan	Transformers inker (with Ian Akin); 1986–1988	Succeeded by Dave Hunt
Preceded by N/A	The New Gods inker 1986–1988	Succeeded by Bob Wiacek
