= Professor Xavier and the X-Men =

Comic book series

- Cover to Professor Xavier and the X-Men #1. Art by Jan Duursema.

Publication information
- Publisher: Marvel Comics
- Schedule: Monthly
- Format: Ongoing
- Publication date: November 1995 – April 1997
- No. of issues: 18
- Main character: X-Men

Professor Xavier and the X-Men is an American comic book series featuring the X-Men published by Marvel Comics for 18 issues from November 1995 to April 1997.

== Publication history ==
The comic was part of Marvel's experimental 99 cents comics line, which was meant to attract new, young readers who might have been put off by the then US$1.50/1.95 standard prices for comic books. The line was also known for the series Untold Tales of Spider-Man, but was ultimately financially unsuccessful, with all of the books being cancelled by 1997.

The series focused on stories from the era of the original X-Men of the 1960s, and started off with a contemporary remake of The X-Men #1 with new dialogue and art that was told from the point of view of Jean Grey. The series generally focused on retelling old stories from perspective of specific characters, including both heroes and villains. There were also a number of flashback stories regarding the characters.

The concept of the series to tell stories regarding the original five X-Men was later reused by X-Men: The Hidden Years and X-Men: First Class. The Brian Bendis series All-New X-Men also featured the original X-Men, who had been brought to the present to observe a completely changed world.

== Characters ==
- Professor X
- Angel
- Beast
- Cyclops
- Iceman
- Marvel Girl
