= Tom Palmer (comics) =

American comic book artist (1942–2022)

- Born: Thomas John Palmer; July 13, 1941 New York City, U.S.
- Died: August 18, 2022 (aged 81) Oakland, New Jersey, U.S.
- Areas: Inker, Colourist
- Notable works: Tomb of Dracula; Star Wars; The Avengers
- Awards: Alley Award, 1969; Inkpot Award (2010); Inkwell Award for Favorite Finisher/Embellisher (2008); Inkwell Award for The Joe Sinnott Hall of Fame Award (2014)

Thomas John Palmer (July 13, 1941 – August 18, 2022) was an American comic book artist best known as an inker for Marvel Comics.

== Biography ==
Tom Palmer was born on July 13, 1941 in Queens.

Although he created a small amount of penciling work (as well as some cover art and some coloring), the vast majority of his artistic output since the 1960s was as a comic book inker. Reminiscing about how he came to be an inker, Palmer recounted:

I walk in the door and pencil [an] issue of Doctor Strange - first job I ever penciled. At the time, I thought I did a good job, but really it was a stinker. It wasn't up to par. I went back two weeks later to get the next issue, and they said, "No, we're getting someone else to pencil it; would you like to ink it?" I said "Sure!" I'd never inked anything before! But to this day, if someone asks, "Can you handle this new assignment?" I'll say "Sure!" I may not know how to tackle that specific assignment today, but by tomorrow or next week I will.

Palmer's extensive work for Marvel Comics includes runs paired with pencilers Neal Adams on The Avengers and Uncanny X-Men; Gene Colan, on titles such as Doctor Strange, Daredevil, and Tomb of Dracula; and John Buscema, on The Avengers. He also inked the entire run of John Byrne's X-Men: The Hidden Years.

Palmer is widely considered the definitive inker for Gene Colan, whose use of grey textures made his pencils notoriously difficult to ink in a way that did them justice. Colan has stated publishers never answered his requests to be paired with a specific inker. Palmer reasoned that, "I think the way we both worked in the business, we had a book to get out every month, bills to pay, and somehow we were put together as a team. We could have been forgotten and ignored, and we'd not be sitting here today. But somehow, I think, the fans have brought us to this point of recognition."

Palmer's brushy, detailed, and illustrative inking style hearkens back to vintage newspaper comic strips like Steve Canyon and Tarzan, and has influenced later generations of inkers like Klaus Janson, Josef Rubinstein, and Bob McLeod.

Palmer's son Tom Palmer, Jr. is a comic book professional who had a long-running column, Palmer's Picks, in the now defunct Wizard Magazine: The Price Guide to Comics and he was also an editor for DC Comics.

Palmer died on August 18, 2022, at the age of 81.

== Awards ==
In addition to the awards below, Palmer was also named the #3 Inker of American Comics by Atlas Comics.

- 1969 Alley Award
- 1975 "Favorite Inker" Comic Fan Art Award
- 2008 "Favorite Finisher/Embellisher" Inkwell Award
- 2014 "The Joe Sinnott Hall of Fame Award" Inkwell Award
- In 2026, Palmer was selected for inclusion in the Eisner Hall of Fame.

== Selected bibliography ==
=== Marvel Comics ===
- The Amazing Spider-Man Annual #14 (inker) (1981)
- The Avengers #75-96, 257-262, 291–299, ( Inker to John Buscema pencils ) Annual #17, 300, 400 (inker) (1985–1996); #311-318 (co-artist, with Paul Ryan) (1989-1990)
- Captain America (vol. 3) #50 (penciler, with John Romita Sr., Bruce Timm, Ron Frenz, Sal Buscema and Rick Veitch) (2002)
- Doctor Strange (vol. 2) #6, 8-18, 36–45, 47 (inker), 171 (penciler), 172-183 (inker) (1975–1981)
- Giant-Size Man-Thing #5 (inker) (1975)
- Marvel Super-Heroes #23 (penciler) (1969)
- Star Wars (vol. 1) (cover artist) #1-3, 46, 50, 57, 63, 65-91, 100; (penciler) # 10, 63, 65, 70, 87; (inker) #8-10, 46, 49–63, 65–94 (1981–1985) Luke Skywalker: The Rise of a Hero (2017)
- Spider-Man Unlimited #7 (penciler, with Ron Lim and Phil Gosier) (1994)
- The Incredible Hulk (vol. 2) #25, #27-28, #30-32, #34-43, #75, #77-81, #95 (inker) (2001-2006)
- The Tomb of Dracula #1–70 (inker) (1973-1979)
- Thor #272-277, #280 (inker) (1978-1979)
- Uncanny X-Men #56-65; 73, 281–285, 288 (inker) (1969-1992)
- X-Men: The Hidden Years #1–22 (inker) (1999–2001)

=== DC Comics ===
- Action Comics #447, 749, 800 (1975, 1998, 2003)
- Adventure Comics 80-Page Giant vol. 1, #1; vol. 2, #1
- The Adventures of Superman #458, 526, 539, 563, 564, 570, 571 (1989–1999)
- All-Star Batman vol 1, #5
- Atari Force #14 (1985)
- Batgirl #30 (2002)
- Batman #343–345, 348, 553–554, 80-Page Giant #1 (1982–1998)
- The Batman Adventures Annual #1 (1994)
- The Batman Chronicles Gallery vol. 1, #1
- Batman Secret Files and Origins vol 1, #1
- Batman vs. Bane (collected)
- Batman Villains Secret Files and Origins vol. 1, #1
- Batman: Bane of the Demon vol. 1, #1–4
- Batman Black and White vol. 1 (collected)
- Batman Black and White vol. 2 (collected)
- Batman: Bullock's Law vol. 1, #1
- Batman: Bullock's Law vol. 2, #1
- Batman: Gotham Knights vol. 1, #15
- Batman: Knightfall vol. 1 (collected)
- Batman: Knightfall vol. 2 (collected)
- Batman: Legacy vol. 1 (collected)
- Batman: Legacy vol. 2 (collected)
- Batman: Road to No Man's Land vol. 1 (collected)
- Batman: Two Faces vol. 1, #1-2
- Catwoman/Wildcat vol 1, #1–4
- Cyborg vol. 1, #2
- Detective Comics vol. 1, #704, 725

| Preceded by Dan Adkins | Doctor Strange inker 1968–1969 | Succeeded by N/A |
| Preceded by Vince Colletta | Uncanny X-Men inker 1969–1970 | Succeeded by Sam Grainger |
| Preceded by Sam Grainger | Avengers inker 1970–1971 | Succeeded by Frank Giacoia |
| Preceded by Syd Shores | Daredevil inker 1971–1973 | Succeeded by Syd Shores |
| Preceded by Jack Abel | Tomb of Dracula inker 1973–1979 | Succeeded by N/A |
| Preceded by Carlos Garzon | Star Wars inker 1981–1985 | Succeeded by Steve Leialoha |
| Preceded by Joe Sinnott | Avengers inker 1985–1996 | Succeeded by Danny Miki |
| Preceded by Tom Palmer Jr. | The Incredible Hulk vol. 3 inker 2002 | Succeeded by Scott Koblish |
