= Dave Hunt (artist) =

American comic book artist (1942–2017)

- Born: August 2, 1942 Newark, New Jersey
- Died: March 5, 2017 (aged 74)
- Area: Inker
- Pseudonym: Dave Argo

Dave Hunt (August 2, 1942 – March 5, 2017) was an American comic book artist and fine art painter. Most active during the "Bronze Age" of American comics, he did inking for both DC and Marvel comics and Disney's comics. He was also an accomplished hyperrealist painter.

== Career ==
Beginning in 1972, he worked as an inker for Marvel Comics, assisting Mike Esposito and Frank Giacoia. He inked artists including John Byrne and Ross Andru, working on titles such as The Amazing Spider-Man, Captain America and the Fantastic Four. Hunt was the co-inker, with Frank Giacoia, of the first appearance of the Punisher in The Amazing Spider-Man #129 (Feb. 1974). In 1978 Hunt began working for DC, where he worked with Superman pencilers Curt Swan and Kurt Schaffenberger and other artists on Superboy and the Legion of Super-Heroes, Wonder Woman, and DC Comics Presents. In the 1980s, he worked with penciler José Delbo on Marvel's Transformers comics. Beginning in 1991 he worked for Disney, on titles such as The Little Mermaid, Darkwing Duck, and Beauty and the Beast. In the mid 1990s he inked Mr. Hero the Newmatic Man for Tekno Comix. He worked on Scooby-Doo comics for DC from 1999 to 2005. Other pencilers he worked with include John Romita, Gil Kane, George Tuska, Sal Buscema, Tom Morgan, Keith Giffen, George Pérez, Jim Mooney, Don Newton, Jimmy Janes, and Keith Pollard.

== Death ==
Hunt died on March 5, 2017, of complications from cancer.
