= The Price (comics) =

1981 graphic novel by Jim Starlin

- Eclipse Comics graphic novel "The Price" cover

Publication information
- Publisher: Eclipse Comics
- Format: Graphic novel
- Publication date: 1981
- Main character(s): Vanth Dreadstar; Syzygy Darklock

Creative team
- Created by: Jim Starlin
- Written by: Jim Starlin
- Artist: Jim Starlin

The Price, published by Eclipse Comics, is a Dreadstar graphic novel by Jim Starlin featuring Syzygy Darklock. It is the second part of the Metamorphosis Odyssey story arc begun in Epic Illustrated magazine and tells the story of the magician-priest Darklock and his rise to power within the Church of the Instrumentality.

== Publication history ==
The story was originally published in black and white in Eclipse Graphic Album Series #5 in 1981. It was reprinted, with colorized artwork, in Dreadstar Annual #1 (Marvel Comics, 1983). The graphic novel was repackaged one more time, with the addition of a Vanth Dreadstar story from Epic Illustrated #15, by Slave Labor Graphics.

== Synopsis ==
The story begins with a description of the Empirical Galaxy and the two cosmic superpowers that rule it: The Monarchy and the Instrumentality, who have been engaged in a galactic war for two hundred years. The Monarchy is a twelve-centuries old dynasty founded and maintained by a royal family. The Church of the Instrumentality is devoted to "The Twelve Gods", whose leaders hold both spiritual and temporal authority over half the Galaxy. The priests of the Instrumentality are scholars and magicians. The church is corrupt, and its leaders devoted to power, both temporal and magical.

As the story continues, Darklock's brother is horribly murdered. Darklock investigates and finds out that his brother was killed by a demon, and sets out to discover who sent it. Before he can investigate, he is called before the Lord High Papal, head of the church, who orders him to abandon the investigation. The official cause of death is ruled "industrial accident".

Darklock seems to accept the ruling, but plans to continue his investigation. He reveals this to his familiar, a nun named Sister Marian, and adds that his magical abilities are far more advanced than the church realizes. Though he had planned to use his powers to increase his standing in the church and thereby dictate state policy, he will now use them to find his brother's killer.

Darklock succeeds in learning which demon killed his brother, then raises the demon itself. Forcing answers from the demon with his magic powers, Darklock learns that it had been sent by an immensely powerful wizard, a man Darklock could not hope to stand against. The demon also reveals that while it was in the wizard's power, the wizard tortured it mercilessly, causing the demon to hate the wizard so greatly that it is willing to do something it would never otherwise have done: transport Darklock to a dimensional plane where he can absorb godlike magical energy, and become far more powerful than the wizard. Darklock agrees, and receives the power; the ordeal is so great that his body is all but destroyed. He loses both legs, one arm, his right ear, and his left eye; and what remains of his body is wasted and unnaturally elongated. Using the remnants of his brother's estate, he repairs his body with cybernetic parts, maintaining his existence through his will, his great magical ability, and his powerful sense of self-belief.

He confronts the wizard who ordered his brother's death, only to learn that the wizard did everything precisely to bring about Darklock's ascent to power, so he could meet his destiny. The wizard had had a vision of the future where a great "event" is soon to happen, which will have a great positive effect on humanity. He foresaw that either Darklock or his brother would be prominently involved, so the wizard decided to ensure that the "event" took place and had Darklock's brother murdered to draw him in. Then he deliberately tortured the demon, so it would be angry enough to show Darklock the way to gain the vast power he has gained.

The wizard shows Darklock his vision of the future, thus ensuring it will take place. Furious at being made the wizard's tool, Darklock destroys him. As he dies, the wizard reveals that he knew Darklock would kill him, and welcomes it, since he believes he does not have the strength to face what lies ahead. Darklock must bear the burden of the future now. The wizard warns him that even the great power he has now will not be enough, and tells him of the awful way he can increase his power even further. Convinced now of the necessity of the "event" and his role in bringing it about, Darklock makes a terrible bargain: he sacrifices his familiar, Sister Marian, to be eaten alive by a demon. In return the demon grants him even more magical power (though this time in a manner that will not damage him further). Darklock's mystical power now dwarfs any other individual in the Empirical Galaxy, leading the Lord High Papal to say "There goes the most powerful force on two legs I've ever encountered. Darklock's might must be nearly equal to that of one of the Gods".

Darklock then resigns from the church (ironically explaining his condition as the result of an "industrial accident") and sets out for a minor planet called Caldor, a planet inhabited by farmers. On Caldor he meets Vanth, who warns him that he is the protector of the people who live there. Darklock surprises Vanth by revealing that he knows Vanth's history and of the sword of power, and tells him "In certain mystic circles unknown to you, you are referred to as Dreadstar the Starslayer". He tells Vanth of the "event" and of their linked destiny. Vanth initially resists the idea, but accepts Darklock's presence, and Darklock settles down to enlist Vanth in his plan.

At the end of The Price, Darklock gazes up at the stars, and hopes that Sister Marian will forgive him by the time he joins her in the "place reserved for souls that had a purpose in life".

== See also ==
- Dreadstar
- Dreadstar (graphic novel)
