= Ann Nocenti =

American journalist, comic book writer and editor

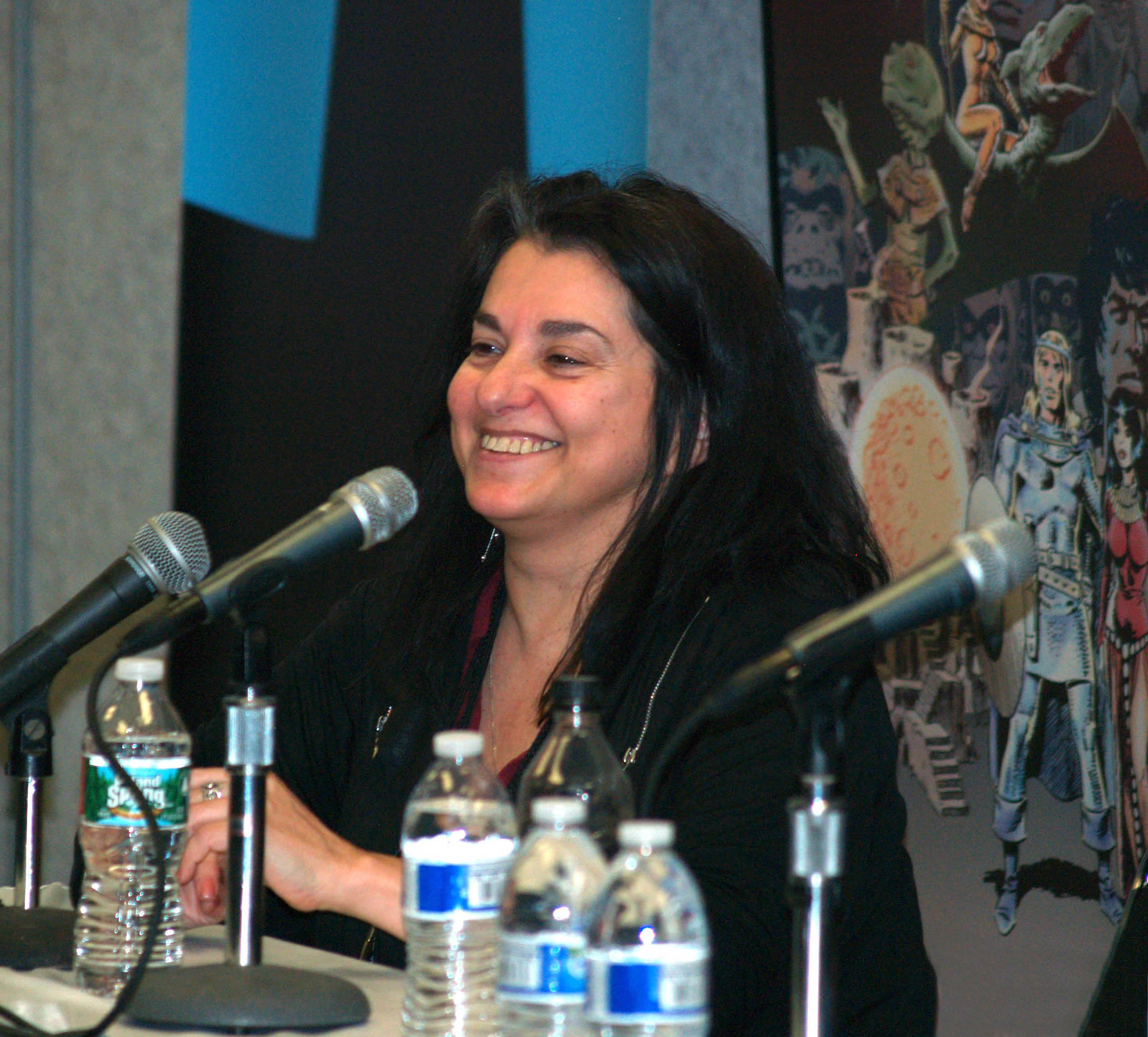
- Nocenti at the 2015 East Coast Comicon in Secaucus, New Jersey
- Born: January 17, 1957 (age 69)
- Areas: Writer, Editor
- Notable works: Longshot, Daredevil
- Awards: Inkpot Award, 2018

Ann "Annie" Nocenti (/nəˈsɛnti/; born January 17, 1957) is an American journalist, filmmaker, teacher, comic book writer and editor. She is best known for her work at Marvel in the late 1980s, particularly a four-year stint as the editor of Uncanny X-Men and The New Mutants (written by Chris Claremont) as well as her run as a writer of Daredevil, illustrated primarily by John Romita Jr. Nocenti has created such Marvel characters as Longshot, Mojo, Spiral, Blackheart, and Typhoid Mary.

Nocenti is noted for her outspoken political views, including on animal rights, which characterized her run on Daredevil.

== Early life ==
When Ann Nocenti was a child, her parents frowned upon comics, though there were some in her house, including Archie Comics, a Pogo anthology that Nocenti loved, and a Dick Tracy anthology whose grotesquely-rendered characters piqued Nocenti's curiosity, more so than the heroes. Nocenti attended college at SUNY New Paltz, during which she discovered the work of Robert Crumb.

== Career ==
=== Comics ===
After graduating from SUNY New Paltz, she discovered the superhero genre when she answered an ad in the Village Voice, which led to her being given her first published comics job at Marvel Comics by editor Dennis O'Neil. Nocenti made her comics writing debut with a six-page mythological story, drawn by Greg LaRocque, in the Marvel anthology Bizarre Adventures #32 (August 1982). She got her first regular comics assignment with Marvel's superhero series Spider-Woman, starting with issue #47 (December 1982). It was not a promising assignment; Marvel had already decided to end the series with issue #50 (June 1983) due to flagging sales. With guidance from editor Mark Gruenwald (who had himself written the series for a time), Nocenti ended the series with the death of the titular character, a decision she came to regret. She recalled, "It was before I understood the intense, personal attachment the readers have to the characters. In retrospect, I realized it wasn't a nice thing to kill a character off. As I worked in the field for a while, I developed a strong personal attachment to a lot of characters and I realized how alive they were." Shortly after, Nocenti lent a hand to Spider-Woman's resurrection in Avengers #240–241 as "story consultant".

Nocenti wrote an issue each of Doctor Strange and Star Wars before writing the four-issue miniseries Beauty and the Beast (December 1984 – June 1985), featuring the superheroes Dazzler and Beast. During this period Nocenti was on staff at Marvel, working as an assistant editor for Carl Potts on such titles as The Incredible Hulk, The Defenders, Doctor Strange, and The Thing.

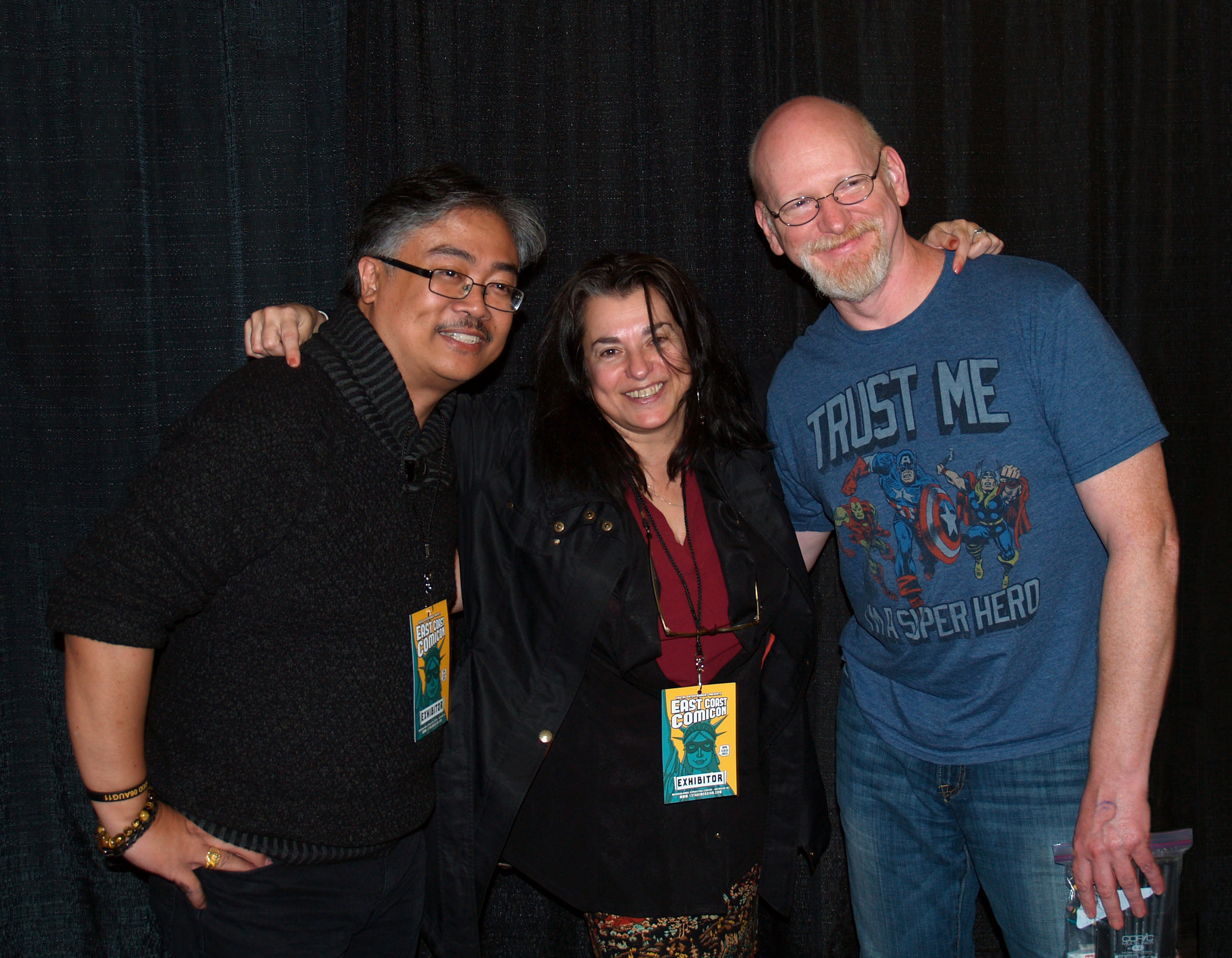
Nocenti with Whilce Portacio and Arthur Adams at the 2015 East Coast Comicon, during the 30th anniversary year of their collaboration on Longshot, and the first time they had appeared in public together since publication of that miniseries

Nocenti and artist Arthur Adams created the character Longshot in a titular, six-issue miniseries (September 1985 – February 1986). Explaining the concept of the character, which Nocenti borrowed from existentialist writers, she states, "Longshot is the idea of stripping someone of everything that they are. I never read comics, so the idea of a hero to me was different. I couldn't think of it in terms of a 'super hero' hero. I thought of it more as a conceptual hero. Not having a comic book background, I tend to come up with the metaphysics before I come up with the characters. I knew that I wanted to deal with the metaphysics of luck. It was a concept that interested me ... what luck is, what probability is, how you could shift probabilities towards yourself. What are the repercussions of that? So, I did a character centered around that idea. At the time, Nocenti was pursuing her master's degree at the School of International and Public Affairs, Columbia University, working at the magazine Lies of Our Times, and reading the work of writers such as Marshall McLuhan, Noam Chomsky, Edward S. Herman and Walter Lippmann. Longshot's archvillain, Mojo, a slaver and dictator who rules his dimension through the television programs he produces, was created as a direct result of these influences. A character named Manufactured Consent after the Chomsky book of the same name, who appeared in the Nocenti's 1990 book The New Mutants Summer Special in 1990, was also born of these works.

After collaborating with Adams on the Spider-Man feature in Web of Spider-Man Annual #2 (September 1986), and with penciler Mike Mignola on a short backup story there, Nocenti teamed with artist Barry Windsor-Smith on Daredevil #236 (November 1986). Two issues later, she became the regular writer for a four-and-a-quarter year run from #238–291 (January 1987 – April 1991), minus issues #246 and #258. John Romita Jr. joined as penciler from #250–282 (January 1988 – July 1990), and was generally inked by Al Williamson. Nocenti specifically addressed societal issues, with Murdock, now running a non-profit urban legal center, confronting sexism, racism, and nuclear proliferation while fighting supervillains. Nocenti introduced the popular antagonist Typhoid Mary in issue #254 (May 1988), as well as the demon Blackheart in #270 (September 1989).

In addition to contributing occasional stories to such anthologies as Marvel Comics Presents and Marvel Fanfare, and writing a handful of Spider-Man fill-ins, Nocenti also produced the graphic novel Someplace Strange in collaboration with artist John Bolton. She also wrote The Inhumans Graphic Novel in 1988, and the 1998 X-Men novel Prisoner X.

In Marvel Comics Presents #150 (1994), Nocenti introduced Jessie Drake, a teenaged mutant, who revealed in issue #151 that she was transgender, marking Marvel's first transgender mutant, and hero. After a 25-year absence, the character reappeared in Marvel's Voices: Pride #1, which Marvel published in June 2021 as part of Pride Month.

For the DC Comics imprint Vertigo, Nocenti wrote the 16-issue run of Kid Eternity (May 1993 – September 1994). Later in the mid-1990s, for Marvel, she wrote a four-issue miniseries each starring Typhoid Mary and the supernatural supervillain Nightmare. After writing two issues of Marvel's The All New Exiles in 1996, plus the four-page dramatic story "Old Man", with artist Bolton, in the Dark Horse Comics anthology Strange Wink #3 (May 1998), Nocenti left comics to pursue journalism. She returned briefly, in 2003 and 2004, writing four Batman stories for DC.

Nocenti was among the writers for Daredevil #500 published in August 2009.

Nocenti wrote Green Arrow starting with issue #7 published in March 2012. In September 2012, Nocenti became the writer of Catwoman with issue #0. She launched a Katana series the following February.

=== Journalism and film ===
In the 1990s, Nocenti began to focus on journalism and filmmaking. She edited High Times magazine for one year (2004) and was an editor on Prison Life Magazine. Her journalism has been published in The Nation, Print, Utne, Heeb, The Brooklyn Rail, CounterPunch, Filmmaker, and Details, as well for MoveOn.org. Nocenti's story "The Most Expensive Road Trip in the World" was collected in The Best American Travel Writing 2008, edited by Anthony Bourdain (Houghton Miifflin). She was an editor and writer for Stop Smiling, guest editing the "Gambling Issue". As editor of the screenwriting magazine Scenario, Nocenti published the original versions of screenplays and interviewed directors and screenwriters.

Nocenti co-directed the documentary The Baluch, shot in Baluchistan, and made the short Creep for Glass Eye Pix.

In 2009, Nocenti taught screenplay writing at the Ciné Institute in Haiti and in 2012 wrote a series for HiLobrow about the country.

Nocenti made a short documentary film with Wendy Johnson titled Disarming Falcons in 2014 which premiered at DOCNYC.

In 2016 she was one of the producers and writers on "Magic City: The Art of the Street", for SC Exhibitions in Dresden, Germany. In 2018 she was an executive producer on "Marvel: Universe of Super-Heroes" at MoPOP museum in Seattle, Washington. In 2018 she wrote The Seeds (with artist David Aja) and in 2019 she wrote Ruby Falls (with artist Flavia Biondi), both for Karen Berger's new comic imprint Berger Books at Dark Horse Comics.

== Cameos and homages ==
Nocenti appears on the photo cover of Spider-Woman #50, in costume as Tigra.

Nocenti appears in The Avengers #215 (Jan. 1982) as a secretary at an advertising agency that Steve Rogers visits looking for work.

Nocenti, along with John Byrne, Ron Wilson, Jim Shooter and Roger Stern are featured in The Thing #7 (January 1983). The issue features the titular character storming into a fictionalized Marvel Comics and encountering the creators behind his own strip.

Nocenti makes a cameo appearance in The Incredible Hulk #291 (January 1984). At the time, Nocenti was assistant editor to Larry Hama on The Incredible Hulk and X-Men. She also appeared in a spoof comic strip in 1984's The Defenders #127.

Arthur Adams visually based the character Ricochet Rita, Spiral's alter ego, on Nocenti.

In Ultimate X-Men, a re-imagination of the X-Men in the alternate universe Ultimate Marvel imprint, Longshot has the civilian name Arthur Centino — his last name an anagram of Nocenti and his first name an homage to artist Arthur Adams, the original character's co-creators.

== Awards ==
Nocenti received an Inkpot Award in 2018.

== Personal life ==
Nocenti lives in New York City.

== Bibliography ==
=== Marvel Comics ===
==== As editor ====
Assistant editor:

- On titles edited by Al Milgrom:
  - The Defenders #104–122 (1982–1983)
  - The Incredible Hulk #269–288 (1982–1983)
  - Micronauts #39–51 (1982–1983)
  - ROM #28–41 (1982–1983) (Note: Nocenti is listed as "editor" in the story credits of issues #33–41.)
  - Star Wars #58–61 (1982) (Note: Louise Jones is listed as "editor" in the story credits of issue #58.)
  - Marvel Fanfare #3–14 (1982–1984)
  - Doctor Strange vol. 2 #56–60, 62 (1982–1983)
  - Fantastic Four #253–257 (1983)
  - Marvel Two-in-One #98 (1983)
  - The Thing #1 (1983)
- On titles edited by Carl Potts:
  - Doctor Strange vol. 2 #61, 63 (1983–1984)
  - The Defenders #123–130 (1983–1984)
  - Fantastic Four #258 (1983)
  - The Incredible Hulk #289–290 (1983)
  - X-Men Classics #1–3 (1983–1984)
  - Amazing High Adventure #1 (1984)
- On titles edited by Louise Jones:
  - Uncanny X-Men #179–182 (1984)
  - Marvel Fumetti Book #1 (1984)
  - The New Mutants #16 (1984)
  - Star Wars #84 (1984)

Series editor:

- The Thing #2–7 (1983–1984)
- The Incredible Hulk #291–294 (1984)
- Uncanny X-Men #183–232, Annual #8–11 (1984–1988) (Note: Issue #232 is co-edited by Nocenti and Bob Harras.)
- The New Mutants #17–66, Annual #1–4, Special Edition #1 (1984–1988) (Note: Annual #4 and issue #66 are co-edited by Nocenti and Bob Harras.)
- Star Wars #85–107 (1984–1986) (Note: Louise Jones is listed as "editor" in the story credits of issue #89.)
- Kitty Pryde and Wolverine #1–6 (1984–1985) (Note: Issue #1 is co-edited by Nocenti and Louise Jones.)
- Starriors #1–4 (1984–1985)
- Nightcrawler #1–4 (1985–1986)
- Misty #1–6 (1985–1986)
- Heroes for Hope #1 (co-edited by Nocenti and Chris Claremont, 1985)
- X-Men/Alpha Flight #1–2 (co-edited by Nocenti and Dennis O'Neil, 1985–1986)
- Greenberg the Vampire (Marvel Graphic Novel #20, 70 pages, 1986, ISBN 0-87135-090-4)
- Firestar #1–4 (1986)
- Classic X-Men #1–23 (1986–1988) (Note: Issue #23 is co-edited by Nocenti and Bob Harras.)
- Dracula (Marvel Graphic Novel #26, 80 pages, 1986, ISBN 0-87135-171-4)
- Fantastic Four vs. the X-Men #1–4 (1987)
- Spider-Man vs. Wolverine #1 (1987)
- Comet Man #1–6 (1987)
- Fallen Angels #1–8 (1987)
- X-Men vs. the Avengers #1–4 (co-edited by Nocenti and Mark Gruenwald, 1987)
- Excalibur Special Edition #1, Excalibur #1 (1987–1988)
- Wolfpack #1 (1988)

Reprint editor:

- Doctor Strange Classics #1–4 (1984)
- Wolverine (tpb, 96 pages, 1987, ISBN 0-87135-277-X)

Consulting editor:

- Revenge of the Living Monolith (Marvel Graphic Novel #17, 64 pages, 1985, ISBN 0-87135-083-1)

==== As writer ====
- Bizarre Adventures #32: "The Streak" (with Greg LaRocque, anthology, 1982)
- Spider-Woman #47–50 (with Brian Postman, 1982–1983)
- The Defenders #127: "Dreams of Glory" (with Marie Severin, humorous two-page story for Assistant Editors' Month starring Nocenti herself, 1984)
- The Avengers #240–241 (as "story consultant"; written by Roger Stern, drawn by Al Milgrom, 1984) collected in The Avengers: Absolute Vision Book One (tpb, 432 pages, 2013, ISBN 0-7851-8534-8)
- Doctor Strange:
  - Doctor Strange vol. 2 #64: "Art Rage" (with Tony Salmons, 1984)
  - Nightmare #1–4: "A Killer of a Love Story" (with Joe Bennett, 1994–1995)
- Amazing High Adventure (anthology):
  - "Gold" (with Tony Salmons, in #1, 1984)
  - "My Heart Belongs to Betsy" (co-written by Nocenti and Eliot R. Brown, art by Gerry Talaoc, in #2, 1985)
- Star Wars #89: "I'll See You in the Throne Room!" (with Bret Blevins, 1984)
  - Collected by Dark Horse in Star Wars Omnibus: A Long Time Ago... Volume 5 (tpb, 568 pages, 2012, ISBN 1-59582-801-X)
  - Collected by Marvel in Star Wars: The Original Marvel Years Omnibus Volume 3 (hc, 1,136 pages, 2015, ISBN 0-7851-9346-4)
- X-Men:
  - Beauty and the Beast #1–4 (with Don Perlin, 1984–1985) collected as X-Men: Beauty and the Beast (hc, 184 pages, 2012, ISBN 0-7851-6273-9)
  - Longshot:
    - Longshot #1–6 (with Arthur Adams, 1985–1986) collected as X-Men: Longshot (tpb, 176 pages, 1988, ISBN 0-87135-568-X; hc, 208 pages, 2008, ISBN 0-7851-3091-8)
    - Marvel Comics Presents #16: "Dreamwalk" (with Larry Dixon, anthology, 1989)
    - X-Men Legends vol. 2 #3–4 (with Javier Pina, anthology, 2022–2023) collected in X-Men Legends: Past Meets Future (tpb, 136 pages, 2023, ISBN 1-302-94629-3)
  - X-Men Classic Omnibus (hc, 1,040 pages, 2017, ISBN 1-302-90811-1) and X-Men Classic: The Complete Collection Volume 2 (tpb, 520 pages, 2019, ISBN 1-302-92058-8) include:
    - Classic X-Men #25, 27–28, 30–34, 38–39, 44 (with John Bolton, Kyle Baker (#38), Jim Lee (#39) and Kieron Dwyer (#44), co-features, 1988–1990)
    - Marvel Fanfare #60: "The Mission" (with Dave Ross, anthology, 1992)
  - Marvel Fanfare #40: "Chiaroscuro" (with David Mazzucchelli, anthology, 1988)
  - Marvel Comics Presents #10–17: "God's Country" (with Rick Leonardi, anthology, 1989) collected in X-Men: Colossus — God's Country (tpb, 168 pages, 2016, ISBN 0-7851-9525-4)
  - The New Mutants Summer Special: "A Mutant in Megalopolis" (with Bret Blevins, 1990) collected in The New Mutants: Cable (tpb, 496 pages, 2020, ISBN 1-302-92523-7)
  - Storm:
    - Storm #1-5, collected in Storm: Blowback (tpb, 120 pages, 2023, ISBN 9781302952532)
    - What If...? vol. 2 #40: "What If Storm Stayed a Thief?" (with Steve Carr and Deryl Skelton, anthology, 1992) collected in X-Men: Alterniverse Visions (tpb, 144 pages, 1995, ISBN 0-7851-0194-2)
  - Wolverine: Evilution (with Mark Texeira and John Royle, one-shot, 1994) collected in Wolverine: To the Bone (tpb, 480 pages, 2023, ISBN 1-302-95168-8)
- Spider-Man:
  - Web of Spider-Man:
    - Annual #1: "Give Me a Hand, Future Max" (with Tony Salmons, 1985)
    - Annual #2 (1986):
      - "Wake Me Up I Gotta be Dreaming" (with Arthur Adams)
      - "You're Lying, Peter Parker" (with Mike Mignola)
    - Spider-Man: Life in the Mad Dog Ward (tpb, 144 pages, 2013. ISBN 0-7851-8503-8) collects:
      - "Mad Dog Ward, Part One: What's the Matter with Mommy?" (with Cynthia Martin, in #33, 1987)
      - "Mad Dog Ward, Part Two: Mad Dogs" (with Cynthia Martin, in The Amazing Spider-Man #295, 1987)
      - "Mad Dog Ward, Part Three: I am... Spider!" (with Cynthia Martin, in The Spectacular Spider-Man #133, 1987)
      - Spider-Man #29–31: "Return of the Mad Dog Ward" (with Chris Marrinan, 1992–1993)
  - Spider-Man #17 (with Rick Leonardi, 1991) collected in Infinity Gauntlet Omnibus (hc, 1,248 pages, 2014, ISBN 0-7851-5468-X)
  - Venom: The Madness #1–3 (with Kelley Jones, 1993–1994) collected in Venom: The Enemy Within (tpb, 240 pages, 2013, ISBN 0-7851-8434-1)
  - The Spectacular Spider-Man #213–214 (with James W. Fry III, 1994), Annual #14 (co-written by Nocenti and D. Blaise from a plot by J. M. DeMatteis and Tom Lyle, art by Sal Buscema, 1994)
- Daredevil:
  - Daredevil (with Barry Windsor-Smith (#236), Sal Buscema (#238), Louis Williams (#239–240, 243–244), Todd McFarlane (#241), Keith Pollard (#242), Chuck Patton (#245), Keith Giffen (#247), Rick Leonardi (#248–249, 277), John Romita, Jr.(#250–257, 259–263, 265–276, 278–282, Annual #5), Steve Ditko (#264), Mark Bagley (#283), Lee Weeks (#284–285, 287–288, 290–291), Greg Capullo (#286) and Kieron Dwyer (#289), 1986–1991) collected as:
    - It Comes with the Claws (includes #236, 238–245, 247–251, tpb, 480 pages, 2022, ISBN 1-302-94594-7)
    - A Touch of Typhoid (collects #253–257 and 259–270, tpb, 463 pages, 2016, ISBN 0-7851-9688-9v
    - Heart of Darkness (collects #271–282, tpb, 488 pages, 2017, ISBN 1-302-90791-3)
    - Last Rites (includes #283–291, tpb, 504 pages, 2020, ISBN 1-302-92563-6)
  - Daredevil: Typhoid's Kiss (tpb, 416 pages, 2015, ISBN 0-7851-9326-X) collects:
    - Marvel Comics Presents #109–116, 123–130, 150–151 (with Steve Lightle and Fred Harper (#151), anthology, 1992–1994)
    - The Spectacular Spider-Man #213–214 (with James W. Fry III, 1994)
    - Typhoid #1–4 (with John Van Fleet, Marvel Edge, 1995–1996)
    - Girl Comics #3: "Blindspot" (with Molly Crabapple, anthology, 2010)
  - Marvel Holiday Special 1992: "The Rapt Lamb" (with Tom Grindberg, anthology one-shot, 1993) collected in Daredevil: Dead Man's Hand (tpb, 472 pages, 2021, ISBN 1-302-93238-1)
  - Daredevil #500: "3 Jacks" (with David Aja, co-feature, 2009) collected in Punisher and Bullseye: Deadliest Hits (tpb, 120 pages, 2017, ISBN 1-302-90578-3)
  - Daredevil: Black and White: "Game Room" (prose story with illustrations by David Aja, anthology one-shot, 2010)
  - Elektra: Black, White and Blood #3: "Split" (with Federico Sabbatini, anthology, 2022) collected in Elektra: Black, White and Blood (Treasury Edition, 136 pages, 2022, ISBN 1-302-93268-3; tpb, 2023, ISBN 1-302-93269-1)
  - Elektra #100: "Twisters" (with Sid Kotian, co-feature, 2022) collected in Daredevil: To Heaven Through Hell Volume 4 (hc, 232 pages, 2023, ISBN 1-302-95005-3)
  - Daredevil vol. 8 #2: "The Hand" (with Chip Zdarsky, co-feature, 2022) collected in Daredevil and Elektra: The Red Fist Saga Part One (tpb, 120 pages, 2023, ISBN 1-302-92611-X)
- Marvel Fanfare #30: "Real to Reel" (with Brent Anderson, anthology, 1987)
  - Collected in Moon Knight Omnibus Volume 2 (hc, 960 pages, 2022, ISBN 1-302-93453-8)
  - Collected in Moon Knight: Butcher's Moon (tpb, 464 pages, 2022, ISBN 1-302-94816-4)
- The Inhumans (with Bret Blevins, graphic novel, 72 pages, 1988, ISBN 0-87135-435-7)
- Someplace Strange (with John Bolton, graphic novel, hc, 63 pages, Epic, 1988, ISBN 0-936211-13-X; sc, 1989, ISBN 0-87135-439-X)
- Toxic Crusaders #7: "Girl Power" (with Marie Severin, 1992)
- Marvel Holiday Special 1993: "Harvey Teabiscuiet's Yule Log" (with Tom Grindberg, anthology one-shot, 1994)
- The All-New Exiles #9–10: "Love Wars" (with John Fang, Malibu, 1996)
- Marvel Comics Presents vol. 3 #1: "First Ride" (with Greg Land, anthology, 2019) collected in Tales through the Marvel Universe (tpb, 216 pages, 2020, ISBN 1-302-91746-3)
- Marvel Comics #1001: "Neither Here Nor There" (with Kim Jacinto, anthology, 2019) collected in Marvel Comics 1000 (hc, 144 pages, 2020, ISBN 1-302-92137-1)
- Captain Marvel: Dark Tempest #1–5 (with Paolo Villanelli, 2023–2024)

=== DC Comics ===
- Vertigo:
  - Kid Eternity vol. 3 #1–16 (with Sean Phillips, Sean Harrison Scoffield (#7) and Paul Peart (#15), 1993–1994)
    - A short Kid Eternity story titled "He Who Falls" (art by Duncan Fegredo) was published in Vertigo Jam (anthology one-shot, 1993)
    - Issues #1–9 and the short story from Vertigo Jam are collected as Kid Eternity Book One (tpb, 256 pages, 2017, ISBN 1-4012-6814-5)
  - Mystery in Space: "Here Nor There" (with Fred Harper, anthology one-shot, 2012) collected in Strange Adventures (tpb, 160 pages, 2014, ISBN 1-4012-4393-2)
- Batman:
  - Batman: Gotham Knights #38: "Black and White" (with John Bolton, co-feature, 2003) collected in Batman: Black and White Volume 3 (hc, 288 pages, 2007, ISBN 1-4012-1531-9; tpb, 2008, ISBN 1-4012-1354-5)
  - Batman/Poison Ivy: Cast Shadows (with John Van Fleet, one-shot, 2004)
  - Batman and Catwoman: Trail of the Gun #1–2 (with Ethan Van Sciver, 2004)
  - Catwoman vol. 3 (with Adriana Melo (#0), Rafa Sandoval, Aaron Lopresti (Annual) and Pat Olliffe, 2012–2014) collected as:
    - Death of the Family (collects #0 and 13–18, tpb, 176 pages, 2013, ISBN 1-4012-4272-3)
      - Includes the "Think it Through" short story (art by Emanuela Lupacchino) from Young Romance: A New 52 Valentine's Day Special (anthology, 2013)
    - Gotham Underground (collects #19–24, 26 and Annual #1, tpb, 208 pages, 2014, ISBN 1-4012-4627-3)
      - Includes Batman: The Dark Knight vol. 2 #23.4 (written by Nocenti, art by Georges Jeanty, 2013)
    - Race of Thieves (collects #25, #27–34, tpb, 232 pages, 2014, ISBN 1-4012-5063-7)
  - Catwoman: 80th Anniversary 100-Page Super Spectacular: "Now You See Me" (with Robson Rocha, anthology one-shot, 2020) collected in Batman: 80 Years of the Bat Family (tpb, 400 pages, 2020, ISBN 1-77950-658-9)
- Green Arrow vol. 5 (with Harvey Tolibao, Steve Kurth (#10) and Freddie Williams II, 2012–2013) collected as:
  - Triple Threat (collects #7–13, tpb, 160 pages, 2013, ISBN 1-4012-3842-4)
  - Harrow (includes #14–16, tpb, 144 pages, 2013, ISBN 1-4012-4405-X)
- Katana:
  - Katana: Soultaker (tpb, 256 pages, 2014, ISBN 1-4012-4411-4) collects:
    - Katana #1–10 (with Alex Sanchez, Cliff Richards, Fabrizio Fiorentino (#7) and ChrisCross (#9), 2013–2014)
    - Justice League Dark #23.1: "Twisted" (scripted by Nocenti from story by Dan Didio, art by ChrisCross, Fabrizio Fiorentino and Tom Derenick, 2013)
  - Secret Origins vol. 3 #6: "Full Deck" (with Roger Robinson, anthology, 2015) collected in Secret Origins Volume 2 (tpb, 272 pages, 2015, ISBN 1-4012-5343-1)
- Klarion #1–6 (with Trevor McCarthy, Fabrizio Fiorentino (#4) and Szymon Kudranski (#4–6), 2014–2015)

=== Other publishers ===
- The Foot Soldiers (as editor; written by Jim Krueger, drawn by Phil Hester):
  - Asylum #9: "Three Blind Mice" (anthology, Maximum Press, 1996)
  - The Foot Soldiers vol. 2 #1–5 (with additional art by Steve Yeowell, Mike Parobeck, Michael Avon Oeming, Tony Salmons, Scott McDaniel, Ian Gibson and Steve Rude, Image, 1997–1998)
- Raw Periphery #1: "Jezebel's Virtue" (with James Romberger, an excerpt from the eponymous unreleased project intended for publication at Vertigo; anthology, Slave Labor Graphics, 1997)
- Dark Horse:
  - Strange Wink #3: "Old Man" (with John Bolton, anthology, 1998)
  - The Seeds #1–2 (of 4) (with David Aja, Berger Books, 2018)
    - Following lengthy delays after issue #2, the series was postponed indefinitely.
    - The story was eventually completed and released in its entirety as The Seeds (tpb, 128 pages, 2021, ISBN 1-5067-0588-X)
  - Ruby Falls #1–4 (with Flavia Biondi, Berger Books, 2019–2020) collected as Ruby Falls (tpb, 112 pages, 2020, ISBN 1-5067-1495-1)
- IDW Publishing:
  - Womanthology: Heroic: "What's Lost is Lost" (with Alicia Fernandez, anthology graphic novel, hc, 300 pages, 2012, ISBN 1-61377-147-9; sc, 2015, ISBN 1-63140-329-X)
  - True Blood vol. 2 (co-written by Nocenti and Michael McMillian, art by Michael Gaydos, Greg Scott (#6) and Beni Lobel (#7–9), 2012–2013) collected as:
    - Where Were You? (includes #1–4, hc, 120 pages, 2013, ISBN 1-61377-424-9)
    - Shake for Me (includes #6–9, hc, 128 pages, 2013, ISBN 1-61377-630-6)
- Mine! (A Celebration of Liberty and Freedom for All Benefiting Planned Parenthood): "Tiger" (with Natacha Bustos, anthology graphic novel, hc, 304 pages, ComicMix, 2018, ISBN 1-939888-66-2; sc, 2018, ISBN 1-939888-65-4)
- Edgar Allan Poe's Snifter of Terror #3: "Tar Feathers" (with Fred Harper, anthology, Ahoy Comics, 2018) collected as Edgar Allan Poe's Snifter of Terror Volume 1 (tpb, 192 pages, 2019, ISBN 0-9980442-3-7)
- Ripley's Believe It or Not! vol. 3 #2: "Irish Giant" (with Fred Harper, anthology, Zenescope, 2018) collected as Ripley's Believe It or Not! (tpb, 120 pages, 2019, ISBN 1-942275-86-2)

== Notes ==
Preceded by Louise Jones	Uncanny X-Men editor 1984–1988	Succeeded by Bob Harras
Preceded by Louise Jones	The New Mutants editor 1984–1988	Succeeded by Bob Harras
Preceded by Louise Jones	Star Wars editor 1984–1986	Succeeded by Bob Harras
Preceded by Frank Miller	Daredevil writer 1986–1991	Succeeded by D. G. Chichester
Preceded by Dan Jurgens; Keith Giffen	Green Arrow writer 2012–2013	Succeeded by Jeff Lemire
Preceded by Judd Winick	Catwoman writer 2012–2014	Succeeded by Genevieve Valentine
