= Marada (disambiguation) =

Marada were a group of autonomous communities living on Mount Lebanon during the Middle Ages.

Marada may also refer to:

- Marada (comics), a fantasy comic book character created in 1982 by John Bolton and Chris Claremont
- Marada (mammal), a genus of prehistoric mammals
- The Marada Brigade, a Maronite militia in the Lebanese Civil War
- Marada Movement, a Lebanese political party
- Marada, Libya, a town in Libya
- Marda, Salfit; alt. name for this Palestinian town
