= Someplace Strange =

- Someplace Strange cover, art by John Bolton.
- Publisher: Epic Comics

Creative team
- Writers: Ann Nocenti
- Artists: John Bolton

Original publication
- Date of publication: 1988

Someplace Strange is a graphic novel, published in 1988 by Marvel Comics under that company's Epic Comics imprint. It was written by Ann Nocenti, with artwork by John Bolton.
