= Dreadstar (graphic novel) =

1982 graphic novel by Jim Starlin

- Marvel Comics graphic novel Dreadstar cover
- Date: 1982
- Main characters: Vanth Dreadstar; Syzygy Darklock; Oedi
- Publisher: Marvel Comics

Creative team
- Writers: Jim Starlin
- Artists: Jim Starlin

Dreadstar, published in 1982, is a science fiction comic book published by American company Marvel Comics, the third in the Marvel Graphic Novel series. This graphic novel is also the third part of the Metamorphosis Odyssey and was printed in color from paintings by Jim Starlin.

== Synopsis ==
Following the events told in the Eclipse Comics portion of the Metamorphosis Odyssey, the Dreadstar graphic novel opens with Vanth Dreadstar leading the life of a peaceful farmer. The planet on which he lives was the site of an Instrumentality experiment to create a race of cat-human hybrid warriors. The experiment was a failure, the hybrids are mild-natured and generally only suited to farming. Dreadstar marries a human scientist and lived quietly for some decades.

As the story continues, it becomes apparent that the power of the sword has granted Dreadstar immortality, so he does not age along with his wife. He spends his time farming and studying magic and politics with sorcerer Syzygy Darklock. From Darklock he learns about the history of two equally-matched enemies, the Instrumentality and the Monarchy. These two galactic empires have fought a stalemated war for generations, finally turning into a conflict that neither side wants to win since their war-based economies would collapse.

At first Dreadstar is unwilling to resume his role as a warrior. But after a fleet of Monarchy ships destroys his home, killing his wife and all his friends, he joins the military forces of the Monarchy and sets into motion a plan to force an end to the war.

Dreadstar quickly rises to a military command rank, which enables him to ensure that all members of the attack force that killed his wife and home are sent on suicide missions. He then assassinates the King of the Monarchy and intimidates the new monarch, the weak-willed Gregzor, into following his plan. When Gregzor protests that the great nobles and captains of industry will resist following along, Dreadstar answers that he would deal with any resistance the way he dealt with the former king.

The story continues in the fourth part of the Metamorphosis Odyssey, contained in the pages of the Marvel comic Dreadstar.

== In other media ==
Benderspink, Universal Content Productions and Illuminati Entertainment intended to develop a Dreadstar TV series.

== See also ==
- Dreadstar
- The Price
