= Epic Illustrated =

Comics anthology

- Epic Illustrated #1 (Spring 1980), cover painting by Frank Frazetta.

Publication information
- Publisher: Marvel Comics/Epic Comics
- Format: Ongoing series
- Publication date: Spring 1980 – February 1986
- No. of issues: 34
- Editor: Archie Goodwin

Epic Illustrated was a comics anthology in magazine format published in the United States by Marvel Comics. Similar to the US-licensed comic book magazine Heavy Metal, it featured explicit content, unlike the traditional American comic books of that time bound by the restrictive Comics Code Authority; It also offered its writers and artists ownership rights and royalties in place of the industry-standard work for hire contracts. The series lasted 34 issues from Spring 1980 to February 1986.

A color comic-book imprint, Epic Comics, was spun off in 1982.

== Publication history ==
The magazine was initiated under editor Rick Marschall in 1979 under the title Odyssey, and originally set to launch as an issue of Marvel Super Special. After Marschall learned of at least seven other magazines titled Odyssey, the project was renamed Epic Illustrated and launched as a standalone series. Marschall was replaced by editor Archie Goodwin in September 1979, several months before the first issue was published.

== Stories, series and format ==
The anthology featured heroic fiction and genre stories, primarily fantasy and science fiction, in a broad range of styles. Established mainstream-comics talents such as John Buscema, Jim Starlin, John Byrne, and Terry Austin were featured, as well as such independent-press creators as Wendy Pini and The Studio's Jeffrey Jones, Michael Kaluta, Barry Windsor-Smith, and Bernie Wrightson. Goodwin commissioned stories by many new artists, including Stephen R. Bissette, Pepe Moreno, Jon J Muth, Rick Veitch and Kent Williams. The full-color magazine format allowed for a broader range of color than the traditional three-color printing process, and many of the stories, and all the covers, were painted. Fantasy artists who did not normally work in the comics field, such as Richard Corben, Frank Frazetta, The Brothers Hildebrandt, and Boris Vallejo contributed covers. The contributors to the series retained ownership of their material and were paid royalties.

Epic Illustrated also included an occasional Marvel Comics protagonist, such as the first issue's Silver Surfer story by Stan Lee and John Buscema. Each issue usually featured a main story, a number of regular serials, and anthological shorts.

Writer-penciler John Byrne and inker Terry Austin produced "The Last Galactus Story" as a serial in Epic Illustrated #26-34 (Oct. 1984 - Feb. 1986). Nine of a scheduled 10 installments appeared. Each ran six pages, except part eight, which ran 12.

== Cancellation ==
Due to its expensive nature to the company and low sales, the magazine was canceled with issue #34, leaving the last chapter of "Galactus" unpublished and the story unfinished. Byrne later revealed on his website that the conclusion would have seen a dying Galactus releasing his power, causing a new big bang and transforming his herald Nova into the Galactus of the next universe.

== Selected stories ==
- "Metamorphosis Odyssey", a serial by Jim Starlin in issues #1-9 (Spring 1980 - Dec. 1981), which introduced his Dreadstar character.
- "A Tale Of Elric of Melniboné: The Dreaming City" by Michael Moorcock, Roy Thomas, and P. Craig Russell in issues #3 (Fall 1980), #4 (Winter 1980), and #14 (Oct. 1982).
- Ken Steacy's adaptations of Harlan Ellison's short stories: "Sleeping Dogs" in issue #4 (Winter 1980), "Life Hutch" in #6 (June 1981), and "Run for the Stars" in #11 (April 1982).
- "Abraxas and the Earthman" by Rick Veitch in issues #10-17 (Feb. 1982 - April 1983).
- "Marada" by Chris Claremont and John Bolton in issues #10-12 (Feb.-June 1982) and #22-23 (Feb.-April 1984).
- "Last of the Dragons" by Carl Potts with Dennis O'Neil, Terry Austin, and Marie Severin in issues #15-20 (Dec. 1982 - Oct. 1983).
- "Generation Zero" by Pepe Moreno and Archie Goodwin in issues #17-24 (April 1983 - June 1984).
- "The Sacred and The Profane" by Dean Motter and Ken Steacy in issues #20-26 (Oct. 1983 - Oct. 1984).
- "Young Cerebus", a series of vignettes of the early life of Cerebus the Aardvark by Dave Sim in issues #26 (Oct. 1984), #28 (Feb. 1985), and #30 (June 1985).

== Collected editions ==
- Silver Surfer Epic Collection: Freedom includes the "Silver Surfer" story from Epic Illustrated #1, Marvel Comics, 488 pages, December 2015, ISBN 978-0785199038
- Night and the Enemy includes the stories "Sleeping Dogs", "Life Hutch", and "Run for the Stars" from Epic Illustrated #3-4, and #14, Comico, 84 pages, November 1987, ISBN 9780938965060; Dover Publications, 96 pages, November 2015, ISBN 978-0486799612
- Weirdworld includes the "Weirdworld" stories from Epic Illustrated #9, 11–13, Marvel Comics, 312 pages, April 2015, ISBN 978-0785162889
- Abraxas and the Earthman collects the serial from Epic Illustrated #10-17, King Hell Press, 88 pages, October 2006, ISBN 978-0962486487
- Marvel Graphic Novel #21 presents in full color the "Marada" stories from Epic Illustrated #10-12 originally presented in black and white, Marvel Comics, 64 pages, December 1985, ISBN 978-0871351531
- Last of the Dragons collects the serial from Epic Illustrated #15-20, Epic Comics, 64 pages, April 1988, ISBN 978-0871353351; Dover Publications, 80 pages, December 2015, ISBN 978-0486803579
- Generation Zero collects the serial from Epic Illustrated #17-24, DC Comics, 128 pages, September 1991, ISBN 978-1563890178
- The Sacred and the Profane collects the serial from Epic Illustrated #20-26, Eclipse Comics, 125 pages, June 1987, ISBN 978-0913035184
- Fantastic Four by John Byrne Omnibus Volume 2 includes "The Last Galactus Story" serial from Epic Illustrated #26-34, Marvel Comics, 1224 pages, December 2013, ISBN 978-0785185437
- Toadswart d'Amplestone by Tim A. Conrad collects the serial from Epic Illustrated #25-28, 30–33, Eclipse Books, 106 pages, June 1990, ISBN 1-56060-013-6

== See also ==
- Eclipse
