= Cosmic Odyssey (comics) =

1988 DC Comics science fiction mini-series

Publication information
- Publisher: DC Comics
- Schedule: Monthly
- Format: Limited series
- Genre: Superhero
- Publication date: December 1988 – March 1989
- No. of issues: 4
- Main character(s): Superman; Batman; Green Lantern; Martian Manhunter; Etrigan; Starfire; New Gods; Darkseid

Creative team
- Written by: Jim Starlin
- Penciller: Mike Mignola
- Inker: Carlos Garzón
- Letterer: John Workman
- Colorist: Steve Oliff
- Editor: Mike Carlin

Collected editions
- Cosmic Odyssey: ISBN 1-56389-051-8

Cosmic Odyssey is an American science fiction comic mini-series, first published in 1988 by DC Comics. A four-issue limited series written by Jim Starlin, penciled by Mike Mignola, inked by Carlos Garzón, colored by Steve Oliff, and lettered by John Workman, it tells a story spanning the DC Universe involving a wide variety of major characters including Superman, Batman, and the New Gods.

The series comprised four 48-page prestige format comic books.

== Plot summary ==
=== Book One: Discovery ===
In Book One: Discovery, Darkseid finds a comatose Metron and takes him captive. After going over Metron's data, Darkseid makes a startling discovery. There is something out there more powerful than him and he needs help to conquer it. Darkseid goes to Highfather. An ambassador, Lonar, arrives on Earth and asks the President of the United States to help him contact Superman, Batman, Martian Manhunter, Starfire, Etrigan, Green Lantern, and Jason Blood, Etrigan's former host, who is currently separated from him. Lonar takes them to New Genesis via Boom Tube, to meet Highfather. After they arrive, Orion and Lightray explain that New Genesis and Apokolips have formed an alliance. Highfather then informs the group about the origin of the Anti-Life Equation, New Genesis, and Apokolips. Darkseid then tells the group that Metron was trying to discover new information about the Anti-Life Equation when his mind was shattered and he became comatose. Martian Manhunter probes Metron's mind to find out what he discovered and learns that the Anti-Life Equation is alive. As Metron tried to escape the Anti-Life Equation's dimension, it attacked him and four "aspects" of the Equation were thrust into the main universe. Metron tracked the flight paths of the four aspects and Darkseid tells the heroes that they are currently located on Earth, Rann, Thanagar, and Xanshi. If the aspects can destroy any two of those planets, then the Milky Way will collapse on itself. Darkseid then gives the heroes weapons he designed to capture the aspects and divides the group into teams. Orion and Superman will go to Thanagar, Lightray and Starfire to Rann, Batman and Forager to Earth, and Martian Manhunter and Green Lantern to Xanshi. The separate teams all arrive at their respective planets. Immediately upon arrival on Earth Batman makes a phone call to "a friend" requesting this unknown person keep an eye on Darkseid. Back on New Genesis, Blood asks what his part is in all this. Darkseid and Highfather then reveal an imprisoned Etrigan.

=== Book Two: Disaster ===
In Book Two: Disaster, Superman and Orion arrive on Thanagar where they are met with force - the Anti-Life Aspect has seized control of the Thanagarians' minds. As they proceed towards the location of the Aspect, they are again attacked. Meanwhile, Green Lantern and Martian Manhunter arrive on Xanshi to discover that the population is suffering from a fatal airborne virus and meet a scientist who has been trying to discover a cure. Using his power ring, John Stewart creates a cure from the scientists' experiments. Later, John and J'onn discover that the Aspect has tapped into the planet's core and controls the planet itself. As they head to confront the Aspect, it creates a hurricane in their path and strikes J'onn with lightning, destroying the Anti-Life Catcher weapon built by Darkseid. During this time, John has become increasingly overconfident and builds a new Anti-Life Catcher with his ring. The two then move on to face the Aspect. John places a protective bubble around J'onn and moves him away from the battle, telling him that he can handle it alone. He comes across the Aspect and its bomb, only to discover that the bomb is yellow (which the Green Lantern rings are powerless against). The blast knocks Green Lantern into space and continues until the entire planet is destroyed. Due to the nature of the power ring, both heroes survive the blast. Martian Manhunter finds Green Lantern on a piece of rock in space and tells him: "Thanks to your arrogance and stupidity, I have now seen two worlds die. I will never forgive you for this". Meanwhile on New Genesis, Darkseid and Highfather reveal that Jason Blood must reunite with Etrigan to secure the barrier between dimensions. On Earth, Batman and Forager arrive in the Batcave and discuss their strategy. Batman deduces that the Anti-Life Aspect is going to use Earth's computer network to destroy the planet. Alfred makes Forager a new uniform and Batman discovers that the Aspect is in Arizona. On Rann, Lightray and Starfire try to find Adam Strange and discover that the population of Rann is trying to kill one another. The two heroes meet up with Strange and the three of them begin the search for the Aspect. They arrive at the loading docks and discover the Aspect's bomb. They begin the search for the Aspect by splitting up. Adam Strange is knocked out and Lightray and Starfire meet back up in an attempt to find the Aspect. Back on New Genesis, Blood and Etrigan reunite and Darkseid smiles.

=== Book Three: Decisions ===
In Book Three: Decisions, Lightray and Starfire receive word about Xanshi while caring for the injured Adam Strange. Lightray leaves Starfire with Adam to search for the Anti-Life Aspect. Starfire then discovers an "oily substance" which attacks her. Lightray, finding nothing in his search, returns to find Starfire unconscious along with Adam Strange. Lightray is attacked by the "oily substance" which turns out to be the Aspect. He is knocked out just as Starfire wakes up. Starfire takes both men to safety and confronts the Aspect. Lightray wakes up and sees an unconscious Starfire in the grip of the Aspect and 14 seconds remaining on the countdown. Starfire, who was feigning injury, suddenly flies up and grabs Lightray while the fiery flight emission she produces ignites the Aspect, blowing it and the bomb up before it had a chance to arm itself. While outside, the three heroes notice the Aspect flying into space. Meanwhile on Thanagar, Superman and Orion split up to go after the Aspect. Orion will proceed ahead and keep the Thanagarians busy while Superman burrows beneath the ground in order to sneak in. Superman finds the bomb, but is attacked by a gigantic robot that the Aspect is using as a host. Superman defeats the Aspect and returns to the surface expecting to find hundreds of Thanagarians "waking up". Instead, he finds that Orion has killed hundreds, possibly thousands, of Thanagarians for Superman to fight the Aspect without distraction. Superman hits Orion, knocking him off his Astro-Harness. Orion returns to New Genesis, while Superman remains on Thanagar to bury the dead. Back on Earth, Batman and Forager arrive in Moosejaw, Arizona. Forager suspects that the Aspect will be using a dead Gotham City police officer as a host, but Batman disagrees. He ran into a Parademon a while back in the Gotham sewers and believes the Aspect will be inhabiting its body. Back on New Genesis, Darkseid is losing faith in the heroes' abilities to conquer the four Aspects. He tells Highfather that the time is now to attack it head on. While Highfather is contemplating Darkseid's plan, someone appears and has been reading Highfather's mind. He tells Highfather that he knows how to win the battle with the Anti-Life Equation: let Darkseid have his way. Darkseid then reveals a portion of his plan to Etrigan, who reluctantly agrees, thinking he will save the galaxy. John Stewart, the Martian Manhunter and Orion arrive back to New Genesis and are greeted by Highfather. John walks away, torn up inside by his failure at Xanshi. Highfather tells J'onn to keep an eye on him. Meanwhile, Darkseid has connected a device to himself and Etrigan that will allow Darkseid to manipulate Etrigan's powers. He flips a switch and they are both moved into the Equation's dimension, where they find it waiting for them. The unknown person who appeared to Highfather reappears as Orion and Highfather find that Darkseid and Etrigan have left to attack the Equation. This unknown man tells them that they can still win, but they must join him in order to do it.

=== Book Four: Death ===
In Book Four: Death, Batman and Forager disable the bomb and crush a Parademon under two tons of equipment. Gotham City police officer Joe Bester attacks the two heroes. He is stronger and faster than Batman expected and it is not until Forager cuts his head off that they know why: Bester was a robot.

Suddenly, the Aspect/Parademon stands up, stuns Batman by slamming him into the ground and starts choking him. Batman starts to pass out, unable to break the Aspect's grip when suddenly, Forager's shield hits the Aspect in the back, forcing it to drop Batman. After knocking Forager unconscious, the Aspect repairs the bomb. Forager wakes up and attacks the control station, causing an explosion that destroys it before it can arm. Forager dies in the explosion, sacrificing himself to save the galaxy.

In the meantime, Darkseid and Etrigan discover that the Equation is more powerful than first thought. It appears that they are both about to die when Highfather and Orion appear before them, led by Doctor Fate, who was enlisted by Batman in the first issue by phone call. Fate saves Darkseid and Etrigan, then combines their collective power and takes the fight straight to the Equation. There, Fate reveals that the only way to contain the Equation is by creating a "mystic firebreak". This spell would destroy the dimension they are in, which is a bridge between where the Equation is and the reality that Earth is in.

A huge explosion occurs and Fate, Highfather, Orion, Etrigan, and Darkseid return to New Genesis, with the Equation unable to follow them. Darkseid, released from control, is furious with Fate for "making a puppet out of him" and threatens retaliation, but Superman tells Darkseid he would have to take them all on to do so. Darkseid apologizes and walks away. Meanwhile in another area of New Genesis, John Stewart has used his power ring to pick up a yellow gun, then ordered his ring to travel 20 light years away and come back when he calls it - if he does not call it within one hour, he instructs it to find Hal Jordan. The ring flies away and with tears in his eyes, John puts the gun to his head, while the Martian Manhunter watches from a distance. Finally, he removes the gun from his head. J'onn asks him why he did not do it and then begins to chastise him for being a failure and not being worthy of the ring. John looks up at him angrily, drops the gun, calls for his ring, stands and says, "Screw you J'onzz!". Martian Manhunter smiles as he watches John walk away. Later, Superman and Lightray appear carrying Batman and Forager's body. When Orion insults Forager and refers to him as a "bug", Batman punches him. Orion walks away and as the heroes prepare to return to Earth, they discover that Darkseid is missing as are the weapons that had the imprisoned Aspect within them. On Apokolips, Darkseid shows DeSaad a small piece of pure Anti-Life and on New Genesis, Highfather instructs Orion to return Forager to the Insect Empire.

== Collected editions ==
The series has been collected into a trade paperback in 1992, and has stayed in print through multiple reprintings:

- Cosmic Odyssey (226 pages, May 2003, DC Comics, ISBN 1-56389-051-8, Titan Books, ISBN 1-84023-715-5)

It was also collected in a hardcover Deluxe Edition in 2018:

- Cosmic Odyssey The Deluxe Edition (226 pages, February 2018, DC Comics, 978-1401268152)
