= Metamorphosis Odyssey =

Work by Jim Starlin

- The Price graphic novel, the second section of Metamorphosis Odyssey.
- Created by: Jim Starlin

Publication information
- Publisher: Epic Comics
Title(s)
The Metamorphosis Odyssey
The Price
Dreadstar GN
Dreadstar
- Formats: Original material for the series has been published as a strip in the comics anthology(s) Epic Illustrated and a set of ongoing series and graphic novels.
- Genre: Science fiction
- Publication date: 1980

Creative team
- Writer(s): Jim Starlin
- Artist(s): Jim Starlin

Reprints
- Collected editions
- Volume 1: The Metamorphosis Odyssey: ISBN 0-943151-28-7
- Volume 2: The Price: ISBN 0943151309
- Volume 3: Plan M: ISBN 094315135X
- Volume 4: The Secret of Z: ISBN 0943151465

Metamorphosis Odyssey is a lengthy allegorical story told in several distinct parts in several formats, from illustrated magazines to graphic novels to comic books. The work of American writer/artist Jim Starlin, the story introduces Vanth Dreadstar, who first appears in Epic Illustrated #3.

== Odyssey ==
The first part of Metamorphosis Odyssey was printed in the premier issue of Epic Illustrated magazine, which was published in the Spring of 1980. The story was told in fourteen chapters and continued through the first nine issues of Epic Illustrated, climaxing in the December 1981 issue. The stories were initially in black and white but later transitioned into full color. The story continues in two graphic novels and finally a long-running comic book series.

== Summary ==
The story begins with an immortal mystic named Aknaton, whose Osirosian race was the ancestor of all humanoid life in the Milky Way galaxy. The Osirosians were faced with a terrible threat, a race of destroying conquerors known as the Zygoteans. The Osirosians massed their power and confronted the Zygoteans directly, but failed to defeat them. The Osirosians withdrew to their heavily guarded world and considered other ways to stop the Zygotean menace.

As the Zygotean power only grew, and the Zygoteans conquered, enslaved, and exterminated more and more of the Milky Way, the Osirosians eventually concluded that they were not capable of stopping the Zygoteans, and that therefore the Milky Way was doomed to a long, slow, horrible death. The Osirosians, unwilling to let the Milky Way be slowly strangled by the Zygoteans, evolved a plan to destroy the Zygoteans, whatever the cost. Running the Zygotean blockade of his homeworld, Aknaton set various events in motion to mature over time into the elements he needed for their final plan. The most important actions he took were:

- He visited a world populated only by mindless cannibal beasts and introduced the potential for them to develop intelligence and compassion.
- He visited the planet Earth and encouraged the evolution of proto-humanity.
- He found an uninhabited forest-world and released proto-life of his own creation.
- He created a powerful artifact in the form of an icy sword and left it on the planet Byfrexia.
- The Osirosians created a mystical device, which they named the Infinity Horn, entrusted it to Aknaton who had it hidden in a cavern on a world called Dreamsend by an artificial immortal being he created in order to guard it until the time came to employ it.

Having done all these things, he returned to his homeworld and waited for the last stand. The Osirosians held out for a hundred thousand years, but in the end the Zygoteans overcame their defenses and destroyed them. Armed with all his race's power and his plan, Aknaton escaped, the only survivor.

Aknaton returned to the worlds he had visited a hundred thousand years previously, taking a single native from each one to fulfill their part in the plan: Za, the first of his cannibal race to achieve intelligence; Juliet, a fifteen-year-old girl from Kansas; and Whis'Par, the culmination of the artificial life Aknaton had created on the forest world.

Having gathered the three he needed, Aknaton returned to Byfrexia, where the icy sword had been found by a young Byfrexian named Vanth, who stumbled across it in the Arctic wilderness after ice bears devoured his family. The power of the sword preserved Vanth's life. In time, he came to find that it had other powers as well; it could absorb energy of almost any type and later redirect it as a destructive force; it gave Vanth great toughness and physical strength; it gave him the gift of tongues; and he was able to merge with the sword in a way unforeseen even by its maker, so the sword became a part of him that he could manifest at will. Vanth became obsessed with revenge, and spent many years hunting his world's ice bears nearly to extinction. The other Byfrexians, who depended on the bears for food, eventually leagued against Vanth and drove him offworld, where he spent some unspecified time as a mercenary. When the Zygoteans attacked Byfrexia, Vanth returned home and led resistance to them, becoming known as "The Cold Man".

Aknaton found Vanth and recruited him to be his pilot and bodyguard. Vanth leapt at the chance that there might be a plan to destroy the Zygoteans, though he was shaken when Aknaton revealed the exact nature of the plan to him and the others.

Aknaton had reasoned that since the Zygoteans were undefeatable, and the death of the galaxy could not be prevented, the only remaining kindness was to make the end as quick and painless as possible. He therefore created the Infinity Horn, whose purpose was to destroy the entire Milky Way. Appalled, but convinced that Aknaton's plan was the only option, Vanth and the others agreed. Fighting their way past an army of Zygoteans and their slaves (who had become aware of the plan and fought desperately to stop it), they returned to the cavern on the planet Dreamsend. As Aknaton and Vanth held off the Zygoteans outside, Za, Juliet, and Whis'Par entered the cavern and sounded the Infinity Horn, destroying the entire Milky Way in an instant.

The three who sounded the Horn were transformed into a new kind of being, carrying with them all that remained of the Milky Way, except for Aknaton and Vanth. Aknaton had used his mystic powers to encase himself and Vanth in a bubble of force and throw them into intergalactic space.

Eons later they crashed on a planet in another galaxy, where Vanth shot Aknaton in a fit of rage and guilt over the destruction of the Milky Way galaxy. Mortally wounded, Aknaton confessed that he had goaded Vanth into killing him because he could not live with the guilt. As he died, he told Vanth that he had saved him and brought him here because this galaxy was at a point where it might go down the same path as the Milky Way. Aknaton wanted Vanth to change the destiny of this new galaxy, and if he failed, to then locate the Infinity Horn to destroy this galaxy as well.

== The Price ==
The second part of Metamorphosis Odyssey was a graphic novel from Eclipse Comics called The Price. The novel was originally published in black and white but was colorized for later reprintings. It tells the story of the magician-priest Syzygy Darklock and his rise to power within the Church of the Instrumentality. Although a part of the Dreadstar mythos, this is a solo story featuring Syzygy Darklock with Vanth Dreadstar making a brief appearance at the end.

== Dreadstar, the graphic novel ==
Dreadstar graphic novel published by Marvel Comics

The third part of Metamorphosis Odyssey was the Marvel Graphic Novel #3, Dreadstar, published in 1982. It was printed in color, from paintings by Starlin.

This graphic novel opens with Vanth Dreadstar leading the life of a peaceful farmer. The planet on which he lived was the site of an Instrumentality experiment to create a race of cat-human hybrid warriors. The experiment was a failure, the hybrids were mild-natured and generally only suited to farming. Dreadstar married a human scientist and lived quietly for some decades, but this ends shortly after the arrival of Darklock when a fleet of Monarchy ships destroys his home village, killing his wife and all his friends.

== Dreadstar, the series ==
Dreadstar #1 published by Marvel Comics

Part four of Metamorphosis Odyssey was detailed in the Epic Comics series Dreadstar in the mid-to-late 1980s.

The comic series had several differences from earlier parts of the story. Previous parts were glossy-paper reproductions of ink drawings and paintings; the comics were colorized pencil-and-ink drawings on high-quality, acid-free paper known as Baxter paper. Also, unlike the previous stories, the comic series is episodic in nature, involving longer story arcs, subplots, and a fluid cast of characters. The overall story deals with the efforts of Vanth and Syzygy, and a crew of adventurers they have assembled, to force an end to the war.

The ground they gained in the Monarchy is lost when the Monarchy is betrayed from within by a high minister (who is revealed to be the last surviving Zygotean who followed Akhnaton's mystic escape pod into intergalactic space in hopes of revenge). The Monarchy is overthrown, and the war ends. The Instrumentality conquers the galaxy and begins a campaign of extermination, apparently following the will of their evil Twelve Gods. Vanth and his crew escape the ruin of the Monarchy and join with the remains of the Monarchic fleet to oppose the Instrumentality. Eventually, Vanth and Syzygy destroy the Lord High Papal, overthrow the Instrumentality, and destroy the Twelve Gods.

== Collected editions ==
The series has been collected into various trade paperbacks and hardcovers over the years:

#	Title	Publisher	Year	ISBN	Reprints
1	The Metamorphosis Odyssey	Slave Labor Graphics	Sept 2000	ISBN 0943151287	"Metamorphosis Odyssey" from Epic Illustrated #1-9
2	The Price	Slave Labor Graphics	Oct 2000	ISBN 0943151309	The Price; Dreadstar; "Dreadstar" from Epic Illustrated #15
3	Plan M	Slave Labor Graphics	Feb 2001	ISBN 094315135X	Dreadstar #1-6
4	The Secret of Z	Slave Labor Graphics	Aug 2001	ISBN 0943151465	Dreadstar #7-12
	Dreadstar Definitive Collection: Part 1	Dynamite Entertainment	Sept 2004	ISBN 097496381X	Dreadstar #1-6
	Dreadstar Definitive Collection: Part 2	Dynamite Entertainment	Sept 2004	ISBN 0974963828	Dreadstar #7-12
	Dreadstar Definitive Collection	Dynamite Entertainment	Sept 2004	ISBN 0974963801	Dreadstar #1-12
	Dreadstar: The Beginning	Dynamite Entertainment	2010	ISBN 1606901192	"Metamorphosis Odyssey" from Epic Illustrated #1-9; The Price; Dreadstar; "Dreadstar" from Epic Illustrated #15
1	Jim Starlin's Dreadstar Omnibus	Ominous Press	October 2019	ISBN 9781733679008	"Metamorphosis Odyssey" from Epic Illustrated #1-9; The Price; Dreadstar; "Dreadstar" from Epic Illustrated #15; Dreadstar #1-8
2	Jim Starlin's Dreadstar Omnibus	Ominous Press	October 2019	ISBN 9781733679015	Dreadstar #9-24
3	Jim Starlin's Dreadstar Omnibus	Ominous Press	October 2019	ISBN 9781733679022	Dreadstar #25-40

Note: The full title of all volumes listed here, except Dynamite Entertainment and Ominous Press editions, start with "Dreadstar: ".
