= The Black Dragon (comic book) =

Comic book series

The Black Dragon is a comic book series by Chris Claremont and John Bolton that was originally published by Epic Comics in the 1980s, and later published as a graphic novel by Titan Books.

== Contents ==
The Black Dragon is a medieval fantasy story involving magick and an unleashed evil, taking place in England not long after the Norman Conquest.

== Reception ==
Jonathan Palmer reviewed The Black Dragon for Arcane magazine, rating it an 8 out of 10 overall. Palmer comments that "ignore the corny appearance of Robin Hood and his band of merry men and let Claremont's voluminous text and Bolton's inspirational yet superbly controlled artwork transport you back to the time of legend".
