= John Bolton (illustrator) =

British comic book artist and illustrator (born 1951)

- Born: 23 May 1951 (age 75) London, England
- Area: Artist
- Awards: Inkpot Award (1988)

John Bolton (born 23 May 1951) is a British comic book artist and illustrator most known for his dense, painted style, which often verges on photorealism. He was one of the first British artists to come to work in the American comics industry, a phenomenon which took root in the late 1980s and has since become standard practice.

== Biography ==
Born 23 May 1951 in London, England, Bolton's introduction to comics came about quite casually after he graduated from East Ham Technical College (whose former alumni include Gerald Scarfe, Barry Windsor-Smith and Ralph Steadman) with a degree in graphics and design.

His first works in Great Britain were for magazines like Look In (alongside other British talents such as Arthur Ranson, Angus P. Allan and Jim Baikie), The House of Hammer, and Warrior (edited by Dez Skinn).

In 1981 Marvel Comics' editor Ralph Macchio noticed his work and called him to work for an adaptation of Kull of Valusia for Bizarre Adventures #26 (May 1981). After illustrating two Kull stories, Bolton began working on the historical-fantasy character Marada, written by Chris Claremont (author of X-Men). This was published in Epic Illustrated in black-and-white, and then coloured as a Marvel Graphic Novel.

After another fantasy series, Black Dragon (1985), the duo Claremont & Bolton produced some short stories about X-Men's lives for X-Men Classic. This represented the first introduction of Bolton to the world of superheroes. In this period Bolton worked on covers for Eclipse and Pacific publishers, and on the graphic novel Someplace Strange, written by Ann Nocenti (1988).

=== Horror ===
From 1989 Bolton devoted himself to horror, his favourite genre. Apart from a great number of covers for Dark Horse Comics and adaptations of horror movies, the main work of this period is his collaboration with writer Clive Barker including the Hellraiser comic book version.

In 1990 Bolton worked on the first issue of The Books of Magic for DC Comics, written by Neil Gaiman. The physical appearance of the protagonist, Timothy Hunter, is that of Bolton's eldest son. In other comic books he has also portrayed his wife and sons.

In 1995 Bolton painted the Man-Bat mini-series, written by Jamie Delano for DC Comics. Bolton said he accepted only because the story pivoted on a villain, instead of Batman, who he considered too winning a character.

Later Bolton worked on another Batman book, Batman/Joker: Switch. His latest works include User, written by Devin Grayson, Menz Insana, a mad trip by Christopher Fowler, and Gifts of the Night by Paul Chadwick.

== In other media ==
In 2003, author Neil Gaiman directed A Short Film About John Bolton where the painter (played by John O'Mahony) is interviewed by a reporter seeking to answer "Where do your ideas come from?" The artist is portrayed as very soft-spoken and reclusive, somewhat of a reluctant local celebrity in Crouch End, London. Bolton himself plays a guest interviewed at a gallery showing.

== Awards ==
Bolton received an Inkpot Award in 1988. He won an Eisner Award for Best Painter/Digital Artist in 1996.

== Bibliography ==
Comics work includes:

- Father Shandor (with Steve Moore, in House of Hammer appearing in issues #8, 16, 21, and 24 and later reprinted in Warrior #1-3
- The Spiral Path (with Steve Parkhouse, in Warrior, 1982)
- Army of Darkness (script and art with Sam Raimi and Ivan Raimi, Dark Horse Comics, three-issue mini-series, 1992–1993)
- Batman: Manbat (with Jamie Delano, three issue mini-series, DC Comics Elseworlds, 1995)
- God Save the Queen (with Mike Carey, graphic novel, 96 pages, Vertigo, June 2007, ISBN 1-4012-0303-5)
- The Evil Dead (art, with writer Mark Verheiden, four-issue mini-series, Dark Horse Comics, 2008)
- Shame (art with writer Lovern Kindzierski, trilogy, Renegade Arts Entertainment, Conception 2011, Pursuit 2013, Redemption 2015)

Bolton has illustrated cards for collectible card games like the Magic: The Gathering and Vampire: The Eternal Struggle.
