= Breed (comics) =

Comic book series by Jim Starlin

Publication information
- Publisher: Marvel Comics; Image Comics
- Schedule: Monthly
- Format: Limited series
- Genre: Superhero
- Publication date: January - June 1994; November 1994 – April 1995; May – December 2011
- No. of issues: 19

Creative team
- Created by: Jim Starlin
- Written by: Jim Starlin
- Artist: Jim Starlin

Breed is the title of three limited series of comic books published in the US, written and drawn by Jim Starlin. The first two were published by Malibu Comics under the Bravura imprint; the third limited series was published by Image Comics.

Within the Marvel Comics multiverse, the Breed reality is designated as Earth-21194.

== Publication history ==
The original six-issue limited series was published from January to June 1994, and Breed II ran from November 1994 to April 1995. The subtitle Book of Revelation appeared only on the interior indicia of the second series.

Breed III was planned and started in 1995 but Starlin could not get a publisher interested in it after Malibu Comics went under after acquisition by Marvel Comics. In May 2011, the first issue of Breed III was released through Image Comics.

== Plot ==
=== Breed ===
In 1949, a small town in Texas was wiped out by a mysterious force, leaving behind only skeletons and blood. One girl was found comatose and pregnant. The captain leading the force adopted the boy and raised him as his own. During the Vietnam War, the now grown boy, Raymond Stoner, was ambushed by enemy forces and survived by transforming, which he later forgot. After being discharged and an attempt at living in New York City, Raymond discovers another world called "Elsewhere". There he meets a mysterious woman named Rachel, who reveals that both of them are "'Breeds": half-breeds of demon and human. Most are raised by the demons to be their minions, although they were not. She then teaches him about how demons invade Earth to hunt and find women to breed with. They are attacked by a large force of 'breeds. Rachel is killed, but Ray triumphs over them.

=== Breed II ===
Having been left alone since the death of his 'breed friend and ally Rachel at the conclusion of the first series, Raymond Stoner leaves Elsewhere and tries to find inner peace in a Nepalese Sanctuary in an attempt to banish his (literal) personal demons. Having no success, he leaves the Temple and hones his martial skills fighting in various South American wars, with and against varied rebels and gangsters, but cannot shake off the CIA and the Demons, both of whom are hunting him. He learns more about the nature of these demons and their aims, and realizes he must choose whether to side with humanity in the confrontation which is about to come. Rejecting an offer to join the demons, he battles with the highest level demon he has yet encountered – with the aid of Rachel's spirit – yet his victory comes at a heavy price when the fountain that provides him with his rejuvenating water is destroyed in the battle.

=== Breed III ===
Dreadstar and Oedi appear on the last page of Breed III #5 and in issue #6 along with other of Starlin's creations, such as Wyrd and Kid Kosmos as part of the "Elsewhere Alliance". Issue #7 concludes the storyline.

== Collected editions ==
- Breed: The Book of Genesis (collects Breed limited series, 1994); Malibu 1994; Image 2011
- Breed: The Book of Ecclesiastes (collects Breed II limited series), Image 2011
- Breed: The Book of Revelations (collects Breed III limited series), Image 2012
