= Marvel Holiday Special =

Anthology comic book series by Marvel Comics

Marvel Holiday Special was an anthology comic book series published by Marvel Comics featuring several of its characters in Christmas or holiday-themed stories.

The first Marvel Holiday Special from 1991 is notable for establishing that Santa Claus exists as a mutant character within the Marvel Universe. Santa has since made several appearances in other Marvel titles. Other notable stories include a story by Kurt Busiek in the 1994 issue which filled out the details of a solicited but never-published story from the 1960s X-Men series in which Iceman and Beast fought Metoxo and the Lava Men, closing a continuity gap that fans had wondered about for 25 years.

The Marvel Holiday Special has featured several stories that focus on Jewish characters like The Thing and Shadowcat celebrating Hannukah, as well as other Jewish characters whose religion isn't often clearly depicted in stories. Notably, Thing creator Stan Lee, who is also Jewish, wrote his first story in which Thing discussed his Jewish faith in the 2009 Marvel Holiday Special, 48 years after Thing made his comics debut.

== Publication history ==
Marvel Holiday Special was first published in 1991, with additional specials followed annually until 1996, with the 1995 special being a trade paperback reprinting earlier holiday stories. The title was revived in 2004 and published annually until 2007. Additionally, a trade paperback collecting several holiday stories was published under the name Marvel Holiday Special in 2004. From 2008 to 2010, Marvel published a Digital Holiday Special only on its Marvel Unlimited service. In 2011, Marvel once again published a Marvel Holiday Special. In 2021 and 2022, Marvel published a series of holiday-themed "Infinity Comics" on its Marvel Unlimited Service.

== Stories published in Marvel holiday specials ==
Year	A story	B story	C story	D story	E story	F story	G story	H story	I Story
1991	X-Men Scott Lobdell and Dave Cockrum Collected in X-Men: X-Tinction Agenda Omnibus	Fantastic Four Walter Simonson and Art Adams Collected in Marvel Universe by Arthur Adams Omnibus and Fantastic Four Epic Collection Vol 21	Punisher Steven Grant and Klaus Janson	Thor Tom DeFalco and Sal Buscema	Captain America Len Kaminski and Ron Lim	Ghost Rider Howard Mackie and John Hebert Collected in Ghost Rider: Danny Ketch Omnibus Vol 1 and Ghost Rider: Danny Ketch Epic Collection Vol 2: Bad to the Bone	Captain Ultra Scott Lobdell and Dennis Jensen	Spider-Man Danny Fingeroth and Ron Garney	
1992	Wolverine Larry Hama and Michael Golden Collected in Wolverine Omnibus Vol 4	New Warriors Fabian Nicieza and Darick Robertson Collected in New Warriors Omnibus Vol 2	Spider-Man Stan Lee, Richard Howell, and Steve Lightle	Punisher Carl Potts and Rick Levins	Doc Samson/Hulk Peter David, John Hebert Collected in Incredible Hulk by Peter David Omnibus Vol 2 and Hulk Epic Collection Vol 19	Thanos Jim Starlin and Ron Lim Collected in Silver Surfer: Rebirth of Thanos (1993 printing)	Iron Man Sholly Fish and Tom Morgan Collected in Iron Man Epic Collection Vol 17	Daredevil Ann Nocenti and Tom Grindberg Collected in Daredevil Epic Collection Vol 16 and Daredevil by Nocenti and Romita Jr Omnibus Vol 2	
1993	Spider-Man Steven Grant and Pat Broderick	Nick Fury Howard Chaykin	Marvel Bullpen Barry Dutter and Marie Severin	Captain Ultra Scott Lobdell and Dennis Jensen	Ghost Rider Ann Nocenti and Tom Grindberg Collected in Ghost Rider: Danny Ketch Omnibus Vol 2	Hulk Peter David and Ron Lim Collected in Incredible Hulk by Peter David Omnibus Vol 3 and Hulk Epic Collection Vol 20			
1994	X-Men Kurt Busiek and James Fry	Captain America John Ostrander and Tom Mandrake	Thing/FF Gregory Wright and Mike Manley	Silver Surfer JM DeMattias, Mindy Newell, and Rick Leonardi	Spider-Man Karl Bollers and Gray Morrow	X-Men Karl Bollers and Sal Buscema			
1995	Spider-Man Danny Fingeroth and Ron Garney Reprinted from Marvel Holiday Special 1991	X-Men Scott Lobdell and Dave Cockrum Reprinted from Marvel Holiday Special 1991	Spider-Man Reprint of Amazing Spider-Man #314	Wolverine Larry Hama and Michael Golden Reprinted from Marvel Holiday Special 1992	Spider-Man Steven Grant and Pat Broderick Reprinted from Marvel Holiday Special 1993	Hulk Peter David and Ron Lim Reprinted from Marvel Holiday Special 1993	Spider-Man Karl Bollers and Gray Morrow Reprinted from Marvel Holiday Special 1994	Punisher Carl Potts and Rick Levins Reprinted from Marvel Holiday Special 1992	Spider-Man Stan Lee, Richard Howell, and Steve Lightle Reprinted from Marvel Holiday Special 1992
1996	Spider-Man Mark Waid and Pat Olliffe	Shadowcat (Excalibur) Evan Skolnick and Josh Hood Collected in Excalibur Omnibus Vol 3	Silver Surfer George Perez, Stan Lee, and Rick Leonardi	Rawhide Kid Karl Kesel and Patrick Zircher	Wolverine/X-Men Tom DeFalco and Josh Hood Collected in X-Men: Onslaught Aftermath Omnibus				
2004	JJ Jameson/ Spider-Man Tom DeFalco and Takeshi Miyazawa	X-Men Roberto Aguirre-Sacasa and Roger Cruz	Franklin Richards/FF Robert Aguirre-Sacasa and Duncan Rouleau						
2005	Fantastic Four Shaenon Garrity and Roger Langridge	New Avengers Jeff Parker and Reilly Brown	Fantastic Four Mike Carey and Mike Perkins						
2006	AIM/Hulk Andrew Farrago, Shaenon Gerrity and Ron Lim	Fin Fang Foom/Dr. Strange Scott Gray and Roger Langridge	Fantastic Four Mike Carey and Mike Perkins	Santa Claus Jeff Christiansen					
2007	Spider-Man/ Wolverine Andrew Farrago, Shaenon Gerrity and Lou Kang	Loners CB Cebulski and Alin Urusov	Fantastic Four Mike Carey and Nelson	Reprint of Marvel Age #25 (2nd Story)					
2008 Digital Holiday Special	X-Men Jim McCann and Todd Nauck	Skrull Ryan Penagos and Juan Doe	Werewolf by Night Ben Morse and Stephanie Buscema	Illuminati Brian Reed and Val Semekis					
2009 Digital Holiday Special	Black Cat, Hellcat, Firestar, Photon Abby Densen and Sara Pichelli	Deadpool Fred Van Lente and Sanford Greene Collected in Deadpool Classic Vol 14, Deadpool: The Dead-Head Redemption, and Marvel Holiday Magazine #1	Fantastic Four Stan Lee and Nick Dragotta Collected in Marvel Holiday Magazine #1						
2009 Holiday Spectacular	Illuminati Reprint of the D story from the 2008 Digital Holiday Special	X-Men Reprint of the A story from the 2008 Digital Holiday Special	Skrull Reprint of the B story from the 2008 Digital Holiday Special	Werewolf by Night Reprint of the C story from the 2008 Digital Holiday Special	Hulk Doug Roberts and Jack Kirby	Deadpool Jess Harold and Reilly Brown	Wolverine Reprint of the A story from the 1992 Marvel Holiday Special	X-Men Reprint of the A story from the 1994 Marvel Holiday Special	Reprints of Uncanny X-Men #365; Amazing Spider-Man #166; E story from Franklin Richards: Happy Franksgiving #1
2010 Digital Holiday Special #1	Dr. Doom/ Fantastic Four Victor Carungi and Chris Uminga								
2010 Digital Holiday Special #2	Thor Joelle Sellner and Mike Henderson								
2010 Digital Holiday Special #3	Hulk Randall P. Girdner and Manolo Carot								
2011	Spider-Man Miljenko Horvatic and Andrew Trabbold	Wolverine and the X-Men Kurtis J. Wiebe and Patrick Scherberger	Nick Fury Aaron Shaps and Sebastian Piriz	Thing, Shadowcat (X-Men) Jamie Rich and Paco Diaz					
2018 Season's Beating	Deadpool Jason Latour and Greg Hinkle	Spider-Man Jason Latour and Chris Brunner	Squirrel Girl and Dr. Doom Jason Latour and Marco Del Pennino	West Coast Avengers (Hawkeye and Kid Omega) Jason Latour and Veronica Fish					

== Other Holiday Specials Published by Marvel Comics ==
Marvel Comics has also published a number of holiday-themed one-shots starring Marvel Comics characters and other licensed characters. These include:

- Power Pack Holiday Special – 1991
- Punisher Holiday Special #1-3 – 1992-94
- Sleepwalker Holiday Special – 1992
- Spider-Man Holiday Special – 1995
- Howard the Duck Holiday Special – 1996
- Generation X Holiday Special -- 1998
- Punisher: Red X-Mas – 2004
- Punisher: Silent Night – 2005
- Franklin Richards: Happy Franksgiving – 2006
- Punisher: X-Mas Special – 2006
- GLX-Mas – 2006
- Wolverine: Flies to a Spider – 2008
- Punisher MAX X-Mas Special – 2008
- Deadpool MAX X-Mas Special – 2011
- Gwenpool Special – 2015
- Gwenpool Holiday Special: Merry Mix Up – 2016
- Power Man & Iron Fist Sweet Christmas Annual – 2016
- Merry X-Men Holiday Special – 2018

Holiday specials featuring licensed characters include:

- ALF Holiday Special #1-2 – 1988-89
- Clive Barker's Hellraiser Dark Holiday Special – 1992
- Star Wars: Life Day – 2021

Digital-only holiday specials include:

- Ghost Rider X-Mas Special Infinite Comic – 2016
- Season’s Beatings (Deadpool) – 2018
- Halloween with the Rhino Infinity Comic – 2021
- Iceman's New Year's Resolutions Infinity Comic – 2021
- Happy Holidays, Mr. Howlett Infinity Comic – 2021
- TEST Kitchen Holiday Special – 2022
- Year of the Wong Infinity Comic – 2022

Marvel characters have also celebrated the holidays in regular issues of their ongoing series. Some notable holiday-themed issues of ongoing Marvel Comics series include:

- Nick Fury: Agent of SHIELD #10 (1969)
- Son of Satan #8 (1975)
- Uncanny X-Men #98 (1976)
- Marvel Two-in-One #33 (1977)
- Uncanny X-Men #119 (1978)
- Uncanny X-Men #143 (1980)
- Uncanny X-Men #168 (1982)
- Uncanny X-Men #180 (1983)
- Uncanny X-Men #192-193 (1984)
- Uncanny X-Men #205 (1985)
- New Mutants #38 (1985)
- Vision and the Scarlet Witch #7 (1986)
- Psi-Force #6 (1987)
- The ‘Nam #23 (1988)
- X-Factor #27 (1988)
- Uncanny X-Men #230 (1988)
- Daredevil #253 (1988)
- Marvel Comics Presents #18 (She-Hulk story only) (1988)
- Amazing Spider-Man #314 (1989)
- X-Factor #52 (1989)
- Punisher #43 (1990)
- She-Hulk #36 (1992)
- Generation X #4 (1994)
- Uncanny X-Men #341 (1996)
- Amazing Spider-Man #420 (1997)
- Generation X #24 (1997)
- X-Men Vol 2 #73 (1997)
- Uncanny X-Men #365 (1998)
- Generation X #60-61 (1999)
- Captain Marvel #26 (2002)
- Spider-Man’s Tangled Web #21 (2003)
- X-Men Vol 2 #165 (2004)
- Wolverine #49 (2006)
- Marvel Adventures Spider-Man #46 (2008)
- Fantastic Four #564 (2009)
- Super-Hero Squad #12 (2010)
- Marvel Zombies Christmas Carol #1-5 (2011)
- Avengers Annual #1 (2013)
- Deadpool Killustrated #3 (2013)
- Captain Marvel #11 (2015)
- Spider-Man/Deadpool #12 (2016)
- Marvel Universe Guardians of the Galaxy #15 (2016)
- Moon Girl and Devil Dinosaur #37 (2018)
- Daughters of the Dragon Marvel Digital Original #3 (2019)
- Spider-Bot Infinity Comic #11 (2022)
- Avengers Unlimited Infinity Comic #25 (2022)
- Spider-Man Unlimited Infinity Comic #13-18 (2023)
- Spider-Verse Unlimited Infinity Comic #30 (2022)
- X-Men Unlimited Infinity Comic #118-120 (2023)

Marvel Comics has also published two anthology one-shots celebrating Valentine's Day:

- Marvel Valentine Special #1 (1997), featuring stories starring Spider-Man, Daredevil, Venus, Absorbing Man and Titania, and Cyclops and Phoenix.
- I (heart) Marvel: My Mutant Heart #1 (2006), featuring stories starring Wolverine, Doop, and Cannonball
