= Jim Starlin =

American comics artist and writer (born 1949)

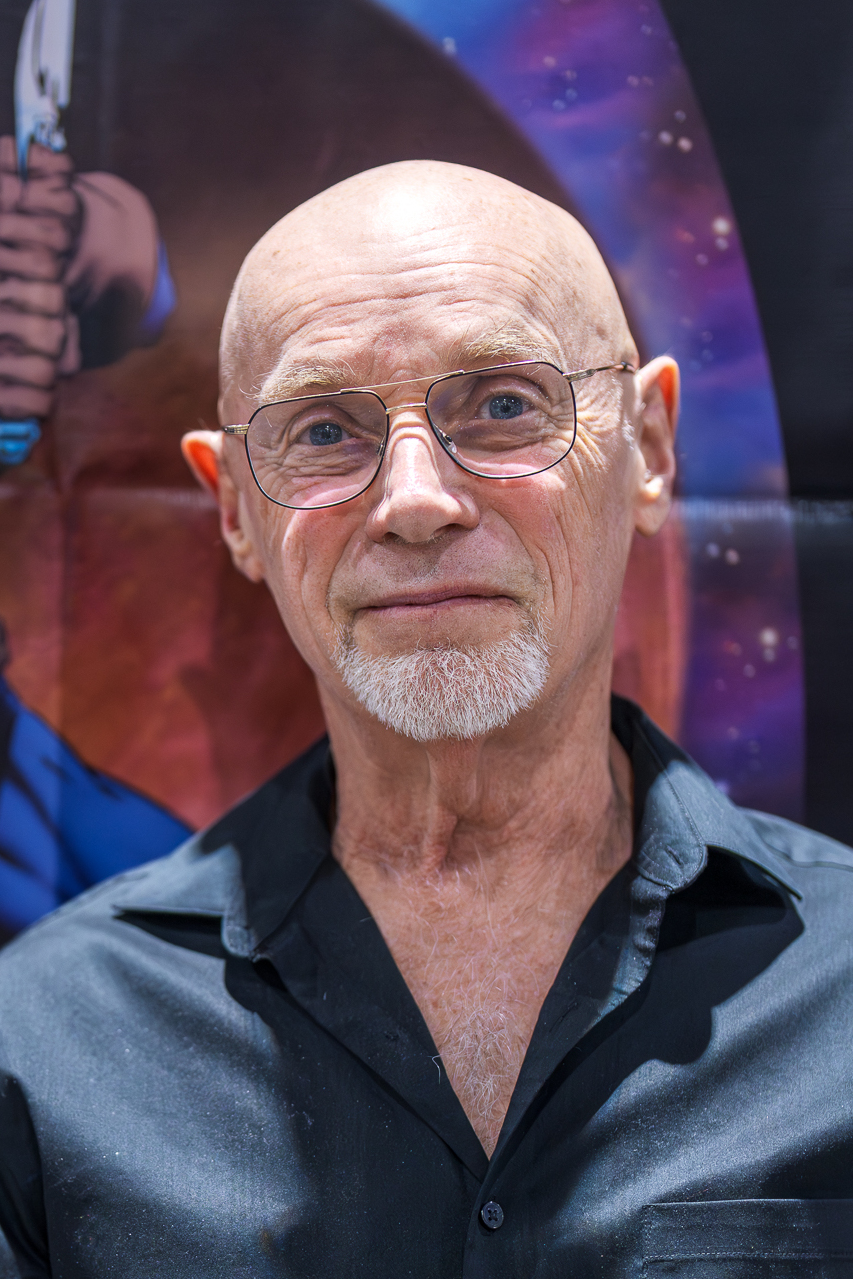
- Starlin at GalaxyCon Richmond in 2026
- Born: James P. Starlin; October 9, 1949 (age 77) Detroit, Michigan, U.S.
- Areas: Writer, Penciller, Artist, Inker, Colourist
- Pseudonym: Steve Apollo
- Notable works: Batman; Captain Marvel; Cosmic Odyssey; Dreadstar; Silver Surfer; The Thanos Quest; The Infinity Gauntlet; Marvel Graphic Novel; Adam Warlock; Death of the New Gods
- Awards: Full list

James P. Starlin (born October 9, 1949) is an American comics artist and writer. Beginning his career in the early 1970s, he is best known for space opera stories, for revamping the Marvel Comics characters Captain Marvel and Adam Warlock, and for creating or co-creating the Marvel characters Thanos, Drax the Destroyer, Gamora, and Shang-Chi. Starlin wrote the miniseries The Infinity Gauntlet and its many sequels including The Infinity War and The Infinity Crusade, all detailing Thanos's pursuit of the Infinity Gems and his conflict with the heroes of the Marvel Universe.

For DC Comics, he drew many iconic characters, including Darkseid, and wrote the seminal storyline A Death in the Family which featured the death of Jason Todd, the second Robin, during his run on Batman. For Epic Illustrated, he created his own character, Dreadstar.

== Early life ==
Jim Starlin was born on October 9, 1949, in Detroit, Michigan. He had a Catholic upbringing. In the 1960s, Starlin served as an aviation photographer in the US Navy in Vietnam. During his off duty time, he drew and submitted various comics.

=== Early career ===
After leaving the navy, Starlin sold two stories to DC Comics.

After writing and drawing stories for a number of fan publications, Jim Starlin entered the comics industry in 1972, working for Roy Thomas and John Romita at Marvel Comics. Starlin was part of the generation of artists and writers who grew up as fans of Silver Age Marvel Comics. At a Steve Ditko-focused panel at the 2008 Comic-Con International, Starlin said, "Everything I learned about storytelling was [due to] him or Kirby. [Ditko] did the best layouts."

Starlin's first job for Marvel was as a finisher on pages of The Amazing Spider-Man. He then drew three issues of Iron Man which introduced the characters Thanos and Drax the Destroyer. He was then given the chance to draw an issue (#25) of the "cosmic" title Captain Marvel. Starlin took over as plotter the following issue, and began developing an elaborate story arc centered on the villainous Thanos which spread across a number of Marvel titles. Starlin left Captain Marvel one issue after concluding his Thanos saga.

Concurrently in the mid-1970s, Starlin contributed a cache of stories to the independently published science-fiction anthology Star Reach. Here he developed his ideas of God, death, and infinity, free of the restrictions of mainstream comics publishers' self-censorship arm, the Comics Code Authority. Starlin also drew "The Secret of Skull River", inked by frequent collaborator Al Milgrom, for Savage Tales #5 (July 1974).

After working on Captain Marvel, Starlin and writer Steve Englehart co-created the character Shang-Chi, Master of Kung Fu, though they only worked on the early issues of the Master of Kung Fu series. Starlin then took over the title Warlock, starring a genetically engineered being created by Stan Lee and Jack Kirby in the 1960s and re-imagined by Roy Thomas and Gil Kane in the 1970s as a Jesus Christ-like figure on an alternate Earth. Envisioning the character as philosophical and existentially tortured, Starlin wrote and drew a complex space opera with theological and psychological themes. Warlock confronted the militaristic Universal Church of Truth, eventually revealed to be created and led by an evil evolution of his future–past self, known as Magus. Starlin ultimately incorporated Thanos into this story. Comics historian Les Daniels noted that "In a brief stint with Marvel, which included work on two characters [Captain Marvel and Adam Warlock] that had previously never quite made their mark, Starlin managed to build a considerable cult following."

In Fall 1978, Starlin, Howard Chaykin, Walt Simonson, and Val Mayerik formed Upstart Associates, a shared studio space on West 29th Street in New York City. The membership of the studio changed over time.

Death and suicide are recurring themes in Starlin's work: Personifications of Death appeared in his Captain Marvel series and in a fill-in story for Ghost Rider; Warlock commits suicide by killing his future self; and suicide is a theme in a story he plotted and drew for The Rampaging Hulk magazine.

Starlin occasionally worked for Marvel's chief competitor DC Comics and drew stories for Legion of Super-Heroes and the "Batman" feature in Detective Comics in the late 1970s.

=== 1980s ===
Starlin co-created the supervillain Mongul with writer Len Wein in DC Comics Presents #27 (Nov. 1980).

The new decade found Starlin creating an expansive story titled "the Metamorphosis Odyssey", which introduced the character of Vanth Dreadstar in Epic Illustrated #3. From its beginning in Epic Illustrated, the initial story was painted in monochromatic grays, eventually added to with other tones, and finally becoming full color. The storyline was further developed in The Price and Marvel Graphic Novel #3 and eventually the long-running Dreadstar comic book, published first by Epic Comics, and then by First Comics.

Starlin was given the opportunity to produce a one-shot story in which to kill off a main character. The Death of Captain Marvel became the first graphic novel published by Marvel itself. (Note: Stan Lee and Jack Kirby's reunion for a Silver Surfer graphic novel in 1978 was published by Simon & Schuster.)

Starlin and Bernie Wrightson produced Heroes for Hope, a 1985 one-shot designed to raise money for African famine relief and recovery. Published in the form of a "comic jam," the book featured an all-star lineup of comics creators as well as a few notable authors from outside the comic book industry, such as Stephen King, George R. R. Martin, Harlan Ellison, and Edward Bryant. In 1986, he and Wrightson produced a second benefit comic for famine relief. Heroes Against Hunger, featuring Superman and Batman, was published by DC and like the earlier Marvel benefit project featured many top comics creators.

Starlin became the writer of Batman, and one of his first storylines for the title was "Ten Nights of The Beast" in issues #417–420 (March – June 1988) which introduced the KGBeast. Starlin then wrote the four-issue miniseries Batman: The Cult (Aug.–Nov. 1988) drawn by Wrightson, and the storyline "Batman: A Death in the Family" in Batman #426–429 (Dec. 1988 – Jan. 1989), in which Jason Todd, the second of Batman's Robin sidekicks, was killed by the Joker. The controversial storyline was suggested by editor Denny O'Neil and lined up with Starlin's well-known desire to remove the Robin character from Batman's storyline. The death was decided by fans, as DC Comics set up a hotline for readers to vote on as to whether or not Jason Todd should survive a potentially fatal situation. Starlin was fired off the Batman title soon afterward.

Other projects for DC included writing The Weird drawn by Wrightson and Cosmic Odyssey drawn by Mike Mignola. Starlin wrote and drew Gilgamesh II in 1989 before returning to Marvel.

=== Later career ===
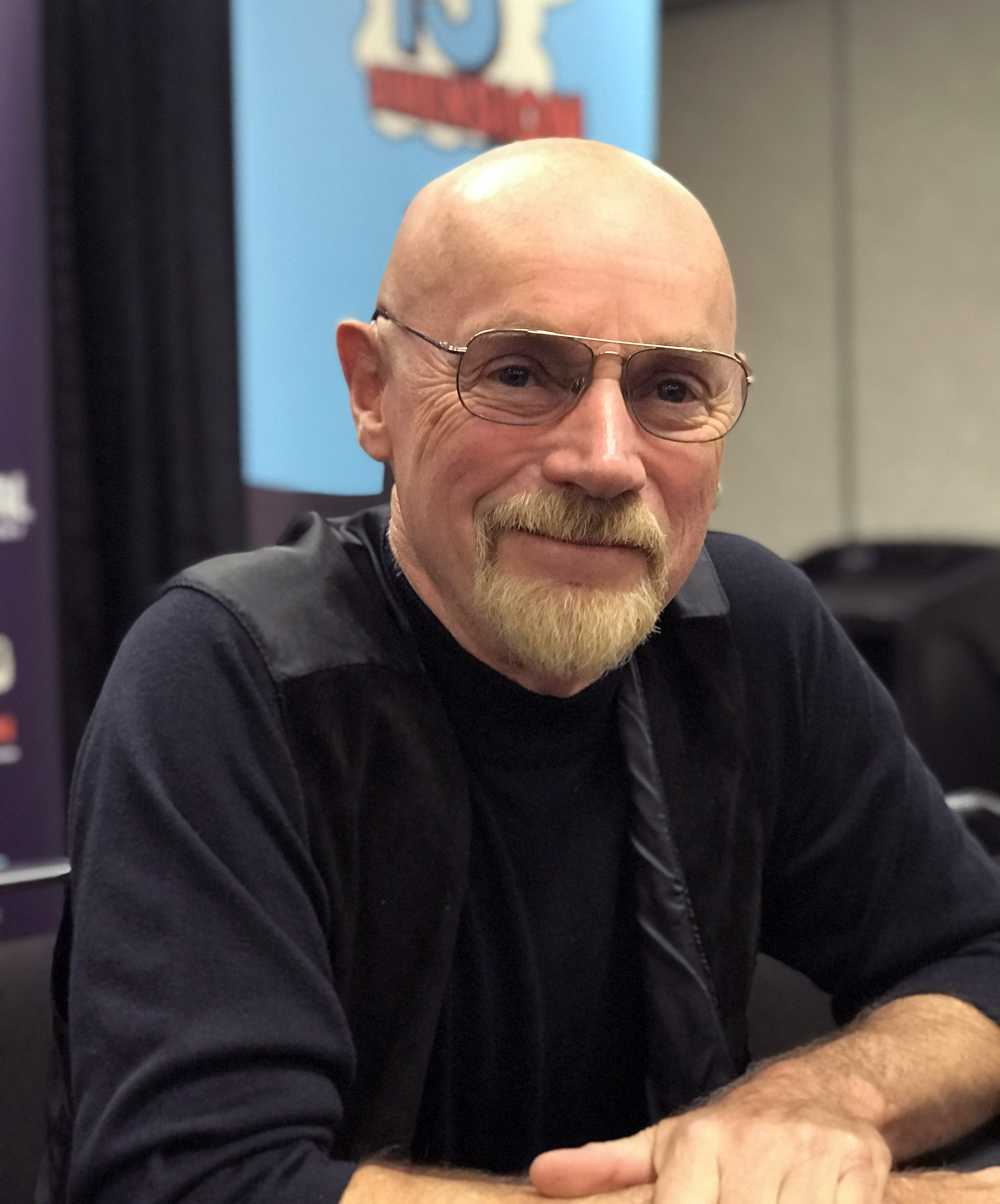
Starlin at the East Coast Comicon, April 2018

Back at Marvel, Starlin began scripting a revival of the Silver Surfer series and introduced his creation Thanos into the story, which led to The Infinity Gauntlet miniseries and its crossover storyline. Here, Starlin brought back Adam Warlock, whom he had killed years earlier in his concluding Warlock story in The Avengers Annual #7 and Marvel Two-in-One Annual #2 in 1977. The Infinity Gauntlet proved successful and was followed by the sequel miniseries The Infinity War and Infinity Crusade.

In 1998, he created Hardcore Station in 1998 for DC Comics.

In 2003, Starlin wrote and drew the Marvel Comics miniseries Marvel: The End. The series starred Thanos and a multitude of Marvel characters, and subsequently, Starlin was assigned an eponymous Thanos series. Starlin then worked for independent companies, creating Cosmic Guard (later renamed Kid Cosmos) published by Devil's Due and then Dynamite Entertainment in 2006.

Starlin returned to DC and, with artist Shane Davis, wrote the miniseries Mystery in Space vol. 2, featuring Captain Comet and Starlin's earlier creation, the Weird. In 2007–2008, he worked on the DC miniseries Death of the New Gods and Rann-Thanagar Holy War, as well as a Hawkman tie-in which altered the character's origins. He wrote the eight-issue miniseries Strange Adventures in 2009 and in 2013, became the writer of Stormwatch, one of the series of The New 52 line, beginning with issue #19.

In 2016, Starlin's drawing hand was injured in an accident, which limited him to writing stories without the opportunity to illustrate them. "It takes me two minutes to write the sentence and will take the artist a day and a half to draw the scene. But there is a certain satisfaction to the drawing part … you get up from the drawing board at the end of the day and there's this image there that wasn't there before. That's very satisfying and I miss that."

In early 2020 it was announced that Starlin had rehabilitated his drawing hand and would be publishing a new Dreadstar graphic novel, Dreadstar Returns, backed by a successful Kickstarter campaign. The book was published in June 2021.

In 2024, Starlin announced that he plans to use generative AI technology for future projects, including Dreadstar vs. Dreadstar.

== Other work ==
- Starlin co-wrote four novels with his then-wife Daina Graziunas (whom he married in October 1980): Among Madmen (Roc Books, 1990), Lady El (Roc Books, 1992), Thinning the Predators (1996, Warner Books; paperback edition entitled Predators); and Pawns (1989, serialized in comic book Dreadstar #42–54).
- Starlin makes a cameo appearance in the film Avengers: Endgame as a member of Steve Rogers's support group.

== Awards ==
- 1973: Won the "Outstanding New Talent" Shazam Award, tied with Walt Simonson
- 1974: Nominated for the "Superior Achievement by an Individual" Shazam Award
- 1975: Won the "Favorite Pro Penciller" Comic Fan Art Award
- 1975: Received an Inkpot Award
- 1977: Nominated for the "Favourite Comicbook Artist" Eagle Award
- 1978:
  - Won the "Favourite Single Story" Eagle Award, for Avengers Annual #7: The Final Threat
  - Won the "Favourite Continued Story" Eagle Award, for Avengers Annual #7 / Marvel Two-in-One Annual #2
  - Nominated for the "Favourite Artist" Eagle Award
  - Nominated for "Best Comic" British Fantasy Award, for Avengers Annual #7: The Final Threat
- 1979: Nominated for "Best Comic" British Fantasy Award, for Among the Great Divide (The Rampaging Hulk #7), with Steve Gerber and Bob Wiacek
- 1986:
  - Won the "Best Long Story" Haxtur Award, for Dreadstar
  - Received the Bob Clampett Humanitarian Award, jointly with Bernie Wrightson
- 1992:
  - Won the "Best Script" Haxtur Award, for Silver Surfer #1–5
  - Nominated for the "Best Long Story" Haxtur Award, for Silver Surfer #1–5, with Ron Lim
- 1993:
  - Nominated for the "Best Script" Haxtur Award, for Deeply Buried Secrets (Silver Surfer #12)
  - Nominated for the "Best Short Story" Haxtur Award, for Deeply Buried Secrets (Silver Surfer #12), with Ron Lim
- 1995:
  - Nominated for the "Best Short Story" Haxtur Award, for Daredevil/Black Widow: Abattoir, with Joe Chiodo
  - Nominated for the "Best Cover" Haxtur Award, for Breed #6
- 2005: Received the "Author That We Loved" Haxtur Award
- 2014: Inkwell Awards Special Ambassador (August 2014 – present)
- 2017: Eisner Award Hall of Fame

== Bibliography ==
=== DC Comics ===
- Adam Strange Special #1 (writer, 2008)
- The Adventures of Superman Annual #1 (writer, 1987)
- Batman #402 (artist, 1986); #414–430 (writer, 1987–1989)
- Batman: The Cult, miniseries, #1–4 (writer, 1988)
- Cosmic Odyssey, miniseries, #1–4 (writer, 1988–1989)
- Countdown to Final Crisis #5 (artist, 2008)
- DC Comics Presents #26–29, 36–37 (writer/artist, 1980–1981)
- Death of the New Gods miniseries #1–8 (writer/artist, 2007–2008)
- Detective Comics #481–482 (writer/artist) (1981)
- The Flash (Firestorm backup stories) #294–296 (artist, 1981)
- Gilgamesh II, miniseries, #1–4 (writer and artist, 1989)
- Green Lantern vol.5 #23.2 (writer, 2013)
- Heroes Against Hunger (writer, 1986)
- Kamandi #59 (OMAC backup story) (writer/artist 1978)
- Mystery in Space miniseries #1–8 (writer/artist with Shane Davis, 2006–2007)
- New Gods vol. 3 #2–4 (writer, with Paris Cullins, 1989)
- Rann-Thanagar Holy War, miniseries, #1–8 (writer, 2008–2009)
- Richard Dragon, Kung-Fu Fighter #2 (artist, with Alan Weiss) (1975)
- Stormwatch vol.3 #19–29 (writer) (2013–2014)
- Strange Adventures miniseries #1–8 (writer/artist among others, 2009)
- Superboy (Legion of Super-Heroes) #239, 250–251 (writer/artist as "Steve Apollo", with co-author Paul Levitz) (1978–1979)
- Superman: The Computers That Saved Metropolis, one-shot (artist, 1980)
- Superman vol. 2 #139 (artist, 1998)
- Sword of Sorcery #5 (artist, 1973)
- The Warlord (OMAC backup stories) #37–39 (writer/artist 1980)
- The Weird, miniseries, #1–4 (writer, 1988)
- Weird War Tales, #89 (cover artist, 1980)

=== Marvel Comics ===
- Adventure into Fear (Man-Thing) #12 (artist, 1973)
- Amazing Adventures, vol. 2, #17 (Beast feature, 2-pages only) (artist, 1973)
- The Amazing Spider-Man #113–114 (artist, 1972); #187 (artist, 1978)
- Astonishing Tales (Ka-Zar) #19 (artist, with Dan Adkins, 1973)
- The Avengers #107 (artist along with George Tuska, 1972); Annual #7 (writer/artist, 1977)
- Book of the Dead (Man-Thing), miniseries, #3 (artist, 1994)
- Captain Marvel #25–34 (full art); #36 (3-pages only) (writer/artist, 1973–1974)
- Captain Marvel vol. 4 #11, 17–18 (artist, 2000–2001)
- The Cat #4 (with Alan Weiss) (artist, 1973)
- Conan the Barbarian #64 (artist, 1976)
- Daredevil #105 (artist, with Don Heck, 1973)
- Daredevil/Black Widow: Abattoir (graphic novel) (writer, 1993)
- Deadly Hands of Kung-Fu #1–2, 15 (writer/artist, 1974–1975)
- Doctor Strange #23–26 (writer/artist, 1977)
- Dracula Lives #2 (artist with Syd Shores, 1973)
- Dreadstar #1–26 (writer/artist, 1982–1986)
- Epic Illustrated #1–9 (Metamorphosis Odyssey); #14, #15 (Dreadstar), #22, #34 (writer/artist, 1980–1986)
- Ghost Rider, vol. 2, #35 (writer/artist, 1979)
- Guardians of the Galaxy: Free Comic Book Day 2014 #1 (The Infinity Revelation backup story) (writer/artist, 2014)
- Guardians of the Galaxy: Mother Entropy, miniseries, #1-5 (writer, 2017)
- Ghost Rider, vol. 2, #35 (writer/artist, 1979)
- Heroes for Hope (writer/back cover artist, 1985)
- The Incredible Hulk vol. 2 #222 (artist, 1978)
- Infinity Abyss, miniseries, #1–6 (writer/artist, 2002)
- The Infinity Crusade, miniseries, #1–6 (writer, 1993)
- Infinity Entity, miniseries, #1–4 (writer, 2016)
- The Infinity Gauntlet miniseries #1–6 (writer, 1991)
- The Infinity War miniseries #1–6 (writer, 1992)
- Iron Man #55–56 (artist, 1973)
- Journey into Mystery (vol. 2) #1, 3 (artist, 1972–1973)
- Marvel Fanfare #20–21 (writer/artist, 1985)
- Marvel Feature #11–12 (artist, 1973)
- Marvel Graphic Novel #1 (The Death of Captain Marvel), #3 (Dreadstar) (writer/artist, 1982); #27 (The Incredible Hulk and the Thing: The Big Change (writer, 1987)
- Marvel Premiere (Doctor Strange) #8 (artist, 1973)
- Marvel Preview (Thor) #10 (artist, 1977)
- Marvel: The End, miniseries, #1–6 (writer/artist, 2003)
- Marvel Two-in-One Annual #2 (writer/artist, 1977)
- Marvel Universe: Millennium Visions (The Infinity Watch: Wish Upon a Star) (writer/artist, 2001)
- Master of Kung-Fu #17, 24 (1974–1975)
- Punisher P.O.V., miniseries, #1–4 (writer, 1991)
- The Punisher: The Ghosts of Innocents (writer, 1993)
- The Rampaging Hulk #4 (writer/artist, 1977), #7 (Man-Thing feature) (artist, 1978)
- Savage Tales #5 (penciller, 1974)
- Shadows & Light #2 (Doctor Strange feature) (writer/artist, 1998), #3 (Werewolf By Night feature) (writer, 1998)
- Silver Surfer, vol 3, #34–38, 40–48, 50 (writer, 1990–1991)
- Silver Surfer: Homecoming original graphic novel (writer, 1991)
- The Silver Surfer/Warlock: Resurrection #1–4 (writer/artist, 1993)
- Spaceknights #1–5 (writer, 2000–2001)
- Special Marvel Edition (Shang-Chi) #15–16 (title changes to Master of Kung Fu) (1973–1974)
- Strange Tales (Warlock) #178–181 (writer/artist, 1975)
- Thanos #1–6 (writer/artist, 2003–2004)
- Thanos Annual #1 (writer, 2014)
- Thanos: The Infinity Conflict (graphic novel) (writer, 2018)
- Thanos: The Infinity Ending (graphic novel) (writer, 2019)
- Thanos: The Infinity Finale (graphic novel) (writer, 2016)
- Thanos: The Infinity Relativity (graphic novel) (writer/artist, 2015)
- Thanos: The Infinity Revelation (graphic novel) (writer/artist, 2014)
- Thanos: The Infinity Siblings (graphic novel) (writer, 2018)
- Thanos vs. Hulk, miniseries, #1–4 (writer/artist, 2015)
- The Thanos Quest, miniseries, #1–2 (writer, 1990)
- Thor, vol. 1, #460-462 (co-writer, 1993)
- Thor, vol. 2, #37 (artist, 2001)
- Warlock #9–15 (writer/artist, 1975–1976)
- Warlock and the Infinity Watch #1–31 (writer, 1992–1994)
- Warlock Chronicles #1–8 (writer, 1993)
- X-Factor Special: Prisoner Of Love (writer, 1990)

=== Other publishers ===
- 'Breed: Book of Genesis #1–6 (miniseries) (writer/artist) (Malibu Comics, 1994)
- 'Breed: Book of Ecclesiastes #1–6 (miniseries) (writer/artist) (Malibu Comics, 1994–1995)
- 'Breed: Book of Revelation #1–7 (miniseries) (writer/artist) (Image Comics 2011)
- Cosmic Guard #1–6 (miniseries) & Kid Kosmos (graphic novel) (writer/artist) (Devil's Due Publishing, 2004–2005, 2007)
- Creepy #106, 114 (artist) (Warren Publishing, 1979–1980)
- Dreadstar #27–32 (writer/artist); #33–40 writer only - main story, 42–54, "Pawns" back-up story (writer) (First Comics, 1986–1989)
- Eclipse Magazine #1 (writer/artist) (Eclipse Enterprises, 1981)
- Eerie #76, 79, 80, 84, 100 (Darklon the Mystic) (writer/artist); #101, 128 (artist) (Warren Publishing, 1976–1982)
- Fighting American: Dogs of War #1–3 (writer) (Awesome, 1998–1999)
- Heavy Metal (vol 3) #4 (writer/artist) (HM Communications, 1979)
- Hellboy: Weird Tales #5 (artist) (Dark Horse, 2003)
- Michael Chabon Presents The Amazing Adventures Of The Escapist #1 (writer/artist) (Dark Horse, 2004)
- Midnight Rose (one-shot) (writer) (AfterShock Comics, 2022)
- Star*Reach #1–2 (writer/artist) (Star*Reach Productions, 1974)
- Supreme: The Return #2 (artist) (Awesome, 1999)
- Unity 2000 #1–3 (miniseries, #4–6 were not published) (artist) (Acclaim, 1999–2000)
- Vampirella #78 (artist) (Warren Publishing, 1979)
- Wyrd the Reluctant Warrior #1–6 (miniseries) (writer/artist) (Slave Labor Graphics, 1999)

=== Covers only ===
- Amazing Adventures vol. 2 #27 (Marvel Comics, 1974)
- The Avengers #120, 135 (Marvel Comics, 1974–1975)
- Captain America #162 (Marvel Comics, 1973)
- Comic Book Artist #18 (Twomorrows Publishing, 2002)
- Daredevil #107 (Marvel Comics, 1974)
- Dejah Thoris #1 (Dynamite Comics, 2022)
- Defenders #110 (Marvel Comics, 1982)
- Dreadstar (1994 series) #1–2 (Malibu Comics, 1994)
- FOOM #9 (Marvel Comics, 1975)
- Green Lantern #129, 133 (DC Comics, 1980)
- The Incredible Hulk vol. 2 #217 (Marvel Comics, 1977)
- Iron Man #68, 100, 160, 163 (Marvel Comics, 1974–1982)
- Jonah Hex #12 (DC Comics, 1978)
- Jungle Action vol. 2 #3 (Marvel Comics, 1973)
- Justice League of America #178–180, 183, 185 (DC Comics, 1980)
- Man-Thing #2 (Marvel Comics, 1974)
- Marvel Preview #13–14 (Marvel Comics, 1978)
- Marvel Super-Heroes #33, 47 (Marvel Comics, 1972–1974)
- Marvel Team-Up #27 (Marvel Comics, 1974)
- Marvel Two-in-One #6 (Marvel Comics, 1974)
- Marvel's Greatest Comics #39, 41 (Marvel Comics, 1973)
- The Mighty World of Marvel #2–20, 22, 24, 26 (Marvel UK, 1972)
- Miracleman #4 (Eclipse Comics, 1985)
- The Rampaging Hulk #5 (Marvel Comics, 1977)
- Super-Villain Team-Up #6 (Marvel Comics, 1976)
- Thanos #7 (Marvel Comics, 2004)

=== Collections ===
Hardcover

- DC Comics Classics Library: A Death In The Family, 272 pages, September 2009, DC Comics, ISBN 9781401225162
- Death of the New Gods, 256 pages, September 2008, DC Comics, ISBN 978-1401218393
- Dreadstar: The Beginning, 230 pages, May 2010, Dynamite, ISBN 978-1606901199
- Dreadstar: The Definitive Collection, 376 pages, September 2004, Dynamite, ISBN 978-0974963808
- Marvel Masterworks: Captain Marvel vol. 3, 288 pages, April 2008, Marvel Comics, ISBN 978-0785130154
- Marvel Masterworks: Warlock vol. 2, 336 pages, July 2009, Marvel Comics, ISBN 978-0785135111
- Marvel Premiere Classic vol. 43: The Death of Captain Marvel, 128 pages, January 2010, Marvel Comics, ISBN 978-0785146278
- Marvel Premiere Classic vol. 46: The Infinity Gauntlet, 256 pages, July 2010, Marvel Comics, ISBN 978-0785145509
- Marvel Premiere Classic vol. 47: Silver Surfer: Rebirth of Thanos, 224 pages, July 2010, Marvel Comics, ISBN 978-0785144786
- Infinity Gauntlet Omnibus, 1248 pages, July 2014, Marvel Comics, ISBN 978-0785154686

Softcover

- Batman: A Death in the Family, 144 pages, March 1988, Re-released in November 2011 with "A Lonely Place of Dying" story added, 272 pages, ISBN 1401232744
- Batman: Ten Nights of the Beast, 96 pages, October 1994, ISBN 1563891557
- Batman: The Cult, 208 pages, 1991, ISBN 0930289854
- Avengers vs. Thanos, 472 pages, March 2013, Marvel Comics, ISBN 978-0785168508
- Captain Marvel by Jim Starlin: The Complete Collection, December 2016, Marvel Comics
- Cosmic Guard (Kid Kosmos), 132 pages, April 2008, Dynamite, ISBN 978-1933305028
- Cosmic Odyssey, 200 pages, September 2009, DC Comics, ISBN 978-1563890512
- Dreadstar: The Definitive Collection
  - Volume 1, 192 pages, August 2004, Dynamite, ISBN 978-0974963815
  - Volume 2, 188 pages, September 2004, Dynamite, ISBN 978-0974963822
- Death of the New Gods, 256 pages, August 2009, DC Comics, ISBN 978-1401222116
- Essential Doctor Strange volume 3, 616 pages, December 2007, Marvel Comics, ISBN 978-0785127338
- Essential Marvel Two-In-One
  - Volume 1, 576 pages, November 2005, Marvel Comics, ISBN 0-7851-1729-6
  - Volume 2, 568 pages, June 2007, Marvel Comics, ISBN 978-0785126980
- Essential Rampaging Hulk volume 1, 584 pages, May 2008, Marvel Comics, ISBN 978-0785126997
- Infinity Abyss, 176 pages, March 2003, Marvel Comics, ISBN 978-0785109853
- Infinity War, 400 pages, April 2006, Marvel Comics, ISBN 978-0785121053
- Infinity Crusade
  - Volume 1, 248 pages, December 2008, Marvel Comics, ISBN 978-0785131274
  - Volume 2, 240 pages, January 2009, Marvel Comics, ISBN 978-0785131281
- The Life of Captain Marvel, 256 pages, October 1991, Marvel Comics, ISBN 978-0871356352
- Thanos: Epiphany, 144 pages, August 2004, Marvel Comics, ISBN 978-0785113553
- Warlock by Jim Starlin: The Complete Collection, 328 pages, February, 2014, Marvel Comics, ISBN 978-0785188476

=== Portfolios ===
- Camelot 4005 (seven black-and-white and one colour plates) (Bob Hakins, 1978)
- Insanity (six black-and-white prints) (Middle Earth, 1974)
- Metamorphosis Odyssey (four colour plates) (S.Q. Productions, 1980)

=== Retrospective ===
- Starlin, Jim; Pruett, Joe (2010). The Art of Jim Starlin. IDW Publishing/Desperado Publishing. ISBN 978-1600107702.

== Notes ==
Preceded by Mike Friedrich (writer); Wayne Boring (artist)	Captain Marvel writer/artist 1973–1974	Succeeded by Steve Englehart and Mike Friedrich (writers); Alfredo Alcala (artist)
Preceded by Mike Friedrich (writer); Bob Brown (artist)	Warlock writer/artist 1975–1976	Succeeded by n/a
Preceded by n/a	Dreadstar writer/artist 1982–1989 (writer); 1982–1987 (artist)	Succeeded by Peter David (writer); Luke McDonnell (artist)
Preceded by Max Allan Collins	Batman writer 1987–1989	Succeeded by Jim Owsley
Preceded by Tom DeFalco and Ron Frenz	Thor writer 1993 (with Ron Marz)	Succeeded by Ron Marz
