= Marada (comics) =

Marada the She-Wolf
- Cover of Marada graphic novel (Marvel Graphic Novel #21, Marvel Comics Group, 1985) by John Bolton.

Publication information
- Publisher: Marvel Comics
- First appearance: Epic Illustrated #10 (Feb. 1982)
- Created by: Chris Claremont (writer); John Bolton (artist)

In-story information
- Alter ego: Marada Starhair
- Species: Human
- Partnerships: Princess Arianrod
- Abilities: Swordsmanship, sorcery, fighting against demons, wizards, and witches

Marada the She-Wolf is a sword and sorcery comic book fictional character created for Marvel Comics by writer Chris Claremont and English artist John Bolton.

== Publication history ==
Marada first appeared in Epic Illustrated #10 (Feb. 1982). The story was originally planned for the character of Red Sonja, Conan's sometime partner, but had to be changed due to issues surrounding the then-in-production Red Sonja film with Brigitte Nielsen. Claremont moved the historical milieu from the Hyborian Age to the Roman Empire, and changed her hair from red to silver. This change of character from Red Sonja to Marada resulted in some dispute over ownership of the character. Since Marada's adventures were first published in the creator-owned series Epic Illustrated, the rights to her character were eventually given to writer Claremont and artist Bolton.

Marada is introduced as "her mother was the firstborn of Caesar", though it is unclear if this refers to Julius Caesar or to a current emperor (bearing the generic title of "Caesar") during the Imperial age. Her adventures are a mix of fantasy and history, told from an adult point of view. Together with her friend, the princess Arianrod, she fights against evil demons, wizards, witches and other fantastic creatures, but also against the threats a woman could expect from a world ruled by males.

In a tip of the hat to New Mutants #32, Marada met a woman named Ashake in the graphic novel, and in a nod to Giant-Size Dracula #2, a demon named Y'Garon. Years later, Marada the She-Wolf, despite being a creator-owned title, was officially integrated into the mainstream Marvel Universe, with handbooks confirming that Ashake seen in Marada is the ancestor of New Mutants' Ashake, thus also making her Storm's ancestor.
