= Dreadstar =

Comic book series

- Epic Comics Dreadstar #1 - cover

Publication information
- Publisher: Marvel Comics; First Comics; Malibu Comics; Dynamite Entertainment; Ominous Press; Monkey Wrench Press
- Format: Ongoing series
- Genre: Science fiction, superhero
- No. of issues: 64, 6 (Vol. 2)
- Main character(s): Dreadstar and company (Vanth Dreadstar, Syzygy Darklock, Oedi, Willow, Skeevo, Ultraviolet, Iron Angel, Tuetun, Junior, Cookie, others)

Creative team
- Written by: Jim Starlin, Peter David
- Artist(s): Jim Starlin, Angel Medina, others

Dreadstar is the first comic-book series that was published by American publisher Epic Comics, an imprint of Marvel Comics, in 1982. It is centered on Vanth Dreadstar, sole survivor of the entire Milky Way galaxy, and an ensemble cast of crewmates, including cyborg sorcerer Syzygy Darklock, and their struggle to end an ancient war between two powerful, evil empires: The Church of The Instrumentality, run by the Lord Papal; and the Monarchy, administered by a puppet king.

The comic book, created by Jim Starlin, was bimonthly during most of its run. Epic published 26 issues, after which it was published by First Comics who carried it for 38 more issues, for a total of 64 issues. The first 41 issues were published bi-monthly, after which the book was published monthly for a time, though it resumed bi-monthly publication with issue #51. In the early 1990s, a six issue limited series was published by Malibu Comics' Bravura line of creator-owned titles. Jim Starlin had stated in interviews as early as 2000 that he was working on a new Dreadstar series titled "Class Warfare" (including sample artwork in Slave Labor Graphics' The Price trade paperback), but the last mention of this was in late 2002. In 2011, in promotion for Breed III, Starlin again mentioned the possibility of another Dreadstar series. In 2021, a 100-page graphic novel by Jim Starlin and inker Jaime Jameson, Dreadstar Returns, was published by Ominous Press, after it was previously crowd-funded through the Kickstarter in 2020. Another Dreadstar graphic novel by the same creative team, Dreadstar vs. The Inevitable, was released in 2024 by Monkey Wrench Press.

== Metamorphosis Odyssey ==
Vanth Dreadstar first appeared in the Metamorphosis Odyssey, in Epic Illustrated #3. In the story, where Dreadstar is not the main character, he unwittingly aids the Orsirosian named Akhnaton in destroying the Milky Way galaxy, the only way to stop the ever-expanding Zygotean empire.

Dreadstar reappears in Marvel Graphic Novel #3, where Dreadstar tries to adjust to a new life on a pastoral world in the Empirical Galaxy, one million years after the Milky Way's destruction, only for his new home to be wiped out in a military attack. The story happens simultaneously with The Price, a graphic novel published by Eclipse Comics, which introduces the magician Syzygy Darklock. The stories become interwoven in each other's final pages, when the characters meet. Dreadstar and Darklock later appear in a short story in Epic Illustrated #15, which sets up the new bimonthly series.

== Epic Comics ==
The series centered on the exploits of Vanth Dreadstar and his crew—powerful mystic Syzygy Darklock, the cybernetic telepath Willow, cat-like humanoid Oedi, and freebooter Skeevo. Vanth, newly arrived in the Empirical Galaxy after the events of the Metamorphosis Odyssey, tries to live a pastoral existence on Oedi's planet of peaceful cat-people, but his peace is disturbed by the arrival of Darklock, who wants him to get involved in the conflict between the two major forces in the galaxy, the Monarchy and the theocratical Instrumentality. Vanth refuses until the war comes to his planet, wiping out most of the population. Oedi survives and joins them; Willow and Skeevo join later, though the team is in place for the first issue.

Dreadstar takes the side of the Monarchy against the evil Lord High Papal of the Instrumentality, but his team end up becoming fugitives when the Monarchy falls, and go to great lengths to try to uncover a traitor in their midst. The series transitioned to First Comics just when the traitor was about to be revealed, and issue #27, the first issue published under First Comics, contained this revelation.

== First Comics ==
The downfall of the Instrumentality came swiftly after the transition to First Comics. Dreadstar, severely injured, went into a coma and awakened in the aftermath of the war—a bureaucracy where those with extraordinary powers, like himself, are commissioned as policemen to track down others of their kind. Eventually, Willow takes over the master computer, and Dreadstar and his friends leave the galaxy again.

Peter David took over the writing duties with issue #41 (March 1989) after Jim Starlin left the title, and remained on it until issue #64 (March 1991), the final issue of that run. Stranded in a nonfunctional ship between galaxies, the crew finds a baby floating in space, who quickly grows to maturity. It is later revealed that the baby is the personification of the Twelve Gods of the Instrumentality, which fled the Empirical Galaxy. Dreadstar finds himself once again in a galactic conflict, except that in the end he discovers he has taken the wrong side. He changes sides just in time, but the personification of the twelve gods had by this point merged with the sword of power of that galaxy and regained their full might. However they were defeated and the gods of the galaxy they were in began to take him prisoner in their realm. As he was being taken away, Dreadstar took the spirit of his teammate Iron Angel with him and then fulfilled a curse that was cast upon him (Dreadstar) that for as long as Dreadstar lived, so would the High Lord Papal. Papal was revived and empowered and battled Dreadstar until Papal's energies got too depleted and he realized it was a different galaxy and fled.

=== Crossroads ===
During the First Comics run, the publisher released the Crossroads mini-series which featured team-ups of the company's major characters. One issue involved Grimjack, Nexus, and Dreadstar. This was alluded to in a later issue of Dreadstar, with several flashback panels depicting Dreadstar alongside Nexus.

== Malibu ==
The Malibu series takes place several years later, with the Lord High Papal training Vanth Dreadstar's daughter Kalla. The characters from the original series, except Oedi, show up, and the series climaxes in Dreadstar apparently being accidentally killed by his own daughter.

In issue #6, the final issue, Dreadstar is alive and back to his old self by the end of the story.

== Image ==
Dreadstar and Oedi appear on the last page of Breed III #5 and in issue #6 along with other of Starlin's creations, such as Wyrd and Kid Kosmos as part of the "Elsewhere Alliance". This story also explains where Oedi disappeared to during the last Dreadstar mini-series.

== TV adaptation ==
In early 2015, Universal Content Productions, Chris Bender and J. C. Spink signed a deal to adapt Dreadstar as a scripted TV series, but these plans were put on indefinite hold due to Spink's unexpected death.

== Reprints ==
In the early 2000s Slave Labor Graphics reprinted the Metamorphosis Odyssey and the first few issues of the Epic series in four black-and-white volumes.

- Dreadstar Volume 1: Metamorphosis Odyssey (ISBN 978-0943151281)
- Dreadstar Volume 2: The Price (ISBN 978-0943151304)
- Dreadstar Volume 3: Plan M (ISBN 978-0943151359)
- Dreadstar Volume 4: The Secret of Z (ISBN 978-0943151465)

In 2004 Dynamite Entertainment reprinted the first 12 issues of the Epic series in two full-color volumes.

- Dreadstar Definitive Collection Volume 1 Part 1 (ISBN 978-0974963815)
- Dreadstar Definitive Collection Volume 1 Part 2 (ISBN 978-0974963822) — Vol. 1, Part 2 contained an ad promising Vol. 2 in 2005 but has not yet been published.

In 2010, Dynamite reprinted Metamorphosis Odyssey in Dreadstar: The Beginning collection along with other Dreadstar stories (ISBN 1606901192). It collects "Metamorphosis Odyssey" from Epic Illustrated #1-9, The Price, Dreadstar graphic novel and "Dreadstar" from Epic Illustrated #15.

In 2019, Ominous Press reprinted Dreadstar comic series along with other stories in three volumes.

- Jim Starlin's Dreadstar Omnibus Volume 1 - collects "Metamorphosis Odyssey" from Epic Illustrated #1-9, The Price, Dreadstar graphic novel, "Dreadstar" from Epic Illustrated #15 and Dreadstar #1-8 (ISBN 9781733679008)
- Jim Starlin's Dreadstar Omnibus Volume 2 - collects Dreadstar #9-24 (ISBN 9781733679015)
- Jim Starlin's Dreadstar Omnibus Volume 3 - collects Dreadstar #25-40 (ISBN 9781733679022)
