= The Mighty Marvel Western =

Marvel comic book series

- The Mighty Marvel Western #1 (Oct. 1968); Cover art by Herb Trimpe and Frank Giacoia

Publication information
- Publisher: Marvel Comics
- Format: Anthology
- Publication date: 1968 - 1976
- No. of issues: 46
- Main character(s): Rawhide Kid; Kid Colt; Two-Gun Kid; Matt Slade

The Mighty Marvel Western is an American comic book series that was published by Marvel Comics. A Western anthology that ran 46 issues, it consisted of reprint stories of the Marvel Old West heroes the Rawhide Kid, Kid Colt, the Two-Gun Kid, and Matt Slade, featuring much art by Jack Kirby, Jack Keller, and others. New covers, on all but three issues, were by Herb Trimpe, John Severin and Gil Kane, among others.

== Publication history ==
The Mighty Marvel Western was an anthology of reprinted mid-1950s to mid-1960s Marvel Comics Western stories. It ran 46 issues, cover-dated October 1968 to September 1975. Mostly bimonthly, with an occasional lapse of a month, it had a five-month hiatus between issues #5-6 (June & Nov. 1969). From 1972 to 1976, it was published monthly during the summer. The first 16 issues were 68- or 52-page, 25¢ "giants", relative to the typical 12¢ and later 15¢ comics of the times, with #17-on published as standard 36-page comics at the prevailing price of 20¢, rising to 25¢ and finally 30¢ by the time it ended publication.

Each issued featured three Old West heroes: the Rawhide Kid and the Two-Gun Kid in all issues, and Kid Colt in all issues except #25-42 (July 1973 - Oct. 1975), in which Matt Slade, from the 1956 series Matt Slade, Gunfighter, published by Marvel forerunner Atlas Comics, was substituted. Several Rawhide Kid stories were drawn by the penciler-inker team of Jack Kirby and Dick Ayers. Virtually all Kid Colt stories were drawn by the character's longtime artist, Jack Keller.

All but three issues featured newly drawn covers. Most were penciled by Herb Trimpe (#1-8, 12–15) or Gil Kane (#18-19, 31, 37–44, 46), with Larry Lieber contributing seven and John Severin and Ayers four each. Rich Buckler and John Romita each drew one, and three new covers are by unknown artists. Three are Kirby reprints.

== See also ==
- Gunsmoke Western
- Western Gunfighters
