= George Tuska =

American comic book artist (1916–2009)

- Tuska in the 1960s
- Born: April 26, 1916 Hartford, Connecticut, U.S.
- Died: October 16, 2009 (aged 93) Manchester Township, New Jersey, U.S.
- Areas: Penciller, Inker
- Pseudonym: Carl Larson
- Notable works: Crime Does Not Pay; Fawcett's Captain Marvel; Iron Man; The World's Greatest Superheroes comic strip
- Awards: Inkpot Award, 1997

George Tuska (/ˈtʌskə/; April 26, 1916 – October 16, 2009), who early in his career used a variety of pen names including Carl Larson, was an American comic book and newspaper comic strip artist best known for his 1940s work on various Captain Marvel titles and the crime fiction series Crime Does Not Pay and for his 1960s work illustrating Iron Man and other Marvel Comics characters. He also drew the DC Comics newspaper comic strip The World's Greatest Superheroes from 1978–1982.

== Biography ==
=== Early life and career ===
George Tuska was born in Hartford, Connecticut, the youngest of three children of Russian immigrants Harry and Anna Onisko Tuska, who had met in New York City. George's siblings Peter, the eldest, and Mary, the middle child, were born in New York City. Years later, Mary died while giving birth to her second child, who was stillborn. Harry, a foreman at a Hartford auto-tire company, died when George was 14. Anna then opened a restaurant in Paterson, New Jersey, where she had relatives, and later remarried. At 17, Tuska moved to New York City, rooming with his cousin Annie, and a year later began attending the National Academy of Design. His artistic influences included illustrators Harold von Schmidt, Dean Cornwell, and Thomas Lovell, and comic strip artists Lou Fine, Hal Foster, and Alex Raymond. At some early point, he took his first job in art, designing women's costume jewelry.

Tuska then began working for comic book packager Eisner & Iger, one of a handful of companies at the time that supplied comics on demand for publishers entering the new medium. His first known published comic-book work appeared in Fox Comics' Mystery Men Comics #1 and Wonderworld Comics #4, both cover-dated August 1939. Tuska in the mid-2000s recalled:

I went to art school at the same I was doing costume jewelry design. I put in an application with a professional agency in New York City. I told them I could do cartooning, drawing. A week later, I got a call from Eisner-Iger, asking me to submit some samples. ... [Eisner] said, 'That's pretty good, but we don't do that [cartoon] stuff'. He showed me a comic book and said, 'This is what we want'. ... I went home and made a page — a whole story in one page. When I brought it back, he bought it for $5. He said, 'We'd like to have you work for us'. That's how I got started. ... I gave up school. ... I made $10 per week.

At Eisner & Iger, Tuska said in 2001, "I worked alongside Bob Powell, Lou Fine, and Mike Sekowsky". His studio colleagues later grew to include artists Charles Sultan, John Celardo, and Nick Cardy, and writer Toni Blum. Writer-artist and company co-founder Will Eisner recalled of the period, "It was a friendly shop, and I guess I was the same age as the youngest guys there. We all got along. The only ones who ever got into a hassle were George Tuska and Bob Powell. Powell was kind of a wiseguy and made remarks about other people in the shop. One day, George had enough of it, got up, and punched out Bob Powell". The otherwise mild-mannered Tuska, thinking comic books "would last two or three years — a fad", later left to seek non-comics work. After two weeks, however, he came across colleagues Sultan and Dave Glaser, on their way to meet with comics packager Harry "A" Chesler. Tuska, invited along, joined Chesler's studio, working there in 1939 and 1940, earning $22 a week, increased to $42 a week within six months. Alongside colleagues that included Sultan, Ruben Moreira, Mac Raboy, and Ralph Astarita, Tuska helped to supply content for such Fawcett Comics publications as Captain Marvel Adventures. Later, when Eisner-Iger client Fiction House formed its own bullpen to produce work on staff, Tuska left Chesler to join Cardy, Jim Mooney, Graham Ingels and other artists there.

Tuska produced work that included, for Fiction House, the South Sea adventure feature "Shark Brodie" (under the pen name George Aksut) and the investigative feature "Hooks Devlin", both for Fight Comics; the rich-vigilante feature "Glory Forbes" in Ranger Comics; and "Jane Martin" in Wings Comics. Before and during his six years at Fiction House, Tuska freelanced such features as the North Atlantic seafaring adventure "Spike Marlin" (as Carl Larson) in Harvey Comics' Speed Comics; "Wing Turner" (as Floyd Kelly) for Fox Comics' Mystery Men Comics; "Archie O'Toole" (as Bud Thomas) in Quality Comics' Smash Comics and "Cosmic Carson" (as Michael Griffith) in Fox's Science Comics.

At some point, Tuska again worked for Will Eisner, now split from Jerry Iger, with a group of artists including Alex Kotzky and Tex Blaisdell. "While with Eisner, I penciled some Spirit and Uncle Sam stories". (Tuska's first Uncle Sam work was the cover and virtually every story in Uncle Sam Quarterly #3, cover-dated Summer 1942.) Independently, he was assigned by Fawcett art director Al Allard to draw "a few more Captain Marvel stories. Allard had asked me to draw as close as possible to the way Captain Marvel had first appeared in Whiz Comics. ... After those freelance jobs, I never worked for Fawcett again". Tuska's earliest Captain Marvel work appeared in Captain Marvel Adventures #2-4 (Summer 1941, Fall 1941, and the oddly dated Oct. 31, 1941).

Drafted into the U.S. Army circa 1942, Tuska was stationed at the 100th Division at Fort Jackson in Columbia, South Carolina where he worked in headquarters drawing artillery. He was honorably discharged as a private first class after a year for reasons the artist did not specify. Returning home, he took up again with Fiction House, drawing a host of stories featuring Reef Ryan, Rip Carson, Lady Satan, the Western hero Golden Arrow, and Camilla, Queen of the Jungle.

=== Crime Does Not Pay ===
Following the huge popularity of superheroes during the World War II years, those characters' appeal began to dwindle in the post-war era. Comic-book publishers, casting about for new subjects and genres, found a hit in crime fiction, the most prominent comic of which was Lev Gleason Publications' Crime Does Not Pay. Tuska would soon make a name for himself as one of the genre's top comics artists. After starting with short backup features and spot illustrations for text stories, Tuska was drawing the lead stories and more by Crime Does Not Pay #50 (March 1947).

=== 1950s ===
Tuska's first work for the future Marvel Comics came in 1949, when Marvel's predecessor company, Timely Comics, was transitioning to its 1950s iteration, Atlas Comics. His first confirmed credit is the seven-page story "Justice Has a Heart" in Casey - Crime Photographer # 1 (Aug. 1949). He quickly went on to draw in an abundance of genres for Atlas, including crime fiction (in titles including Crime Can't Win, Crime Exposed, Private Eye, Justice, Amazing Detective Cases, and All True Crime Cases Comics); military fiction (Men in Action, War Combat, Man Comics, Battlefield, and Battle); horror (Adventures into Weird Worlds, Adventures into Terror, Mystic, Menace, and Strange Tales); and, particularly, Westerns (Black Rider, Gunsmoke Western, Kid Colt, Outlaw, Red Warrior, Texas Kid, Two-Gun Kid, Western Outlaws & Sheriffs, Wild Western, and many others) through 1957, while also occasionally contributing to Lev Gleason and St. John Publications.

Simultaneously at first, from 1954 to 1959, Tuska took over as writer-artist for the failing adventure comic strip Scorchy Smith, supplying "eye-catching drawings and interesting plots, but it was too late". The strip would end in 1961. Tuska by then had moved on to the long-running science-fiction comic strip Buck Rogers, on which he was the final artist, drawing both the daily and Sunday strip from April 1959 to 1965, and the daily only from then through 1967, when both the daily and the Sunday were canceled.

=== The Silver Age ===
Tuska's cover of Iron Man #18 (Oct. 1969) displays a panoply of character faces, as well as both old and new Iron Man armors.

Near the cancellation of the daily Buck Rogers strip, Tuska again found freelance work at Marvel Comics, then in what historians and fans call the Silver Age of Comic Books. "I called [editor-in-chief] Stan [Lee] and he said, 'Come on up', Tuska recalled in the mid-2000s. His first Marvel story, a "Tales of the Watcher" feature in Tales of Suspense #58 (Nov. 1964), included a special introduction by Lee, hailing the return of the Golden Age great.

Tuska became a Marvel mainstay, penciling and occasionally inking other artists on series as diverse as Ghost Rider, Sub-Mariner, and The X-Men. His signature series became Iron Man, on which he enjoyed a nearly 10-year, sometimes briefly interrupted, run from issue #5 (Sept. 1968) to #106 (Jan. 1978). He and writer Archie Goodwin created the Controller as an antagonist in Iron Man #12 (April 1969).

Comics historian Les Daniels noted that when Goodwin, Tuska and inker Billy Graham launched Luke Cage, Hero for Hire in 1972, "it was the first Marvel comic to take its title from a black character." Shanna the She-Devil was created by Carole Seuling, Steve Gerber, and Tuska in the eponymous first issue of that character's own series. He was one of the artists on the licensed movie tie-in series Planet of the Apes. Due to Marvel not having the likeness rights for Charlton Heston, the star of the film, one of the lawyers at 20th Century Fox insisted on changes to Tuska's art. Editor Roy Thomas believed that Tuska "just made a handsome looking guy, but it didn't look like Heston ... you can't argue. If somebody says it looks like Charlton Heston and they're worried he's gonna sue, you can't say 'no' because they just weren't going to give the approval."

The A.V. Club insert of The Onion wrote, shortly before Tuska's death in 2009, that,

Tuska was perfectly competent, and his art for titles like Iron Man and The Incredible Hulk [sic] is decent, though unspectacular. But his drawing was so quickly assayed, and so essentially flavorless, that he became the King of the Fill-In Issue, hopping in to provide bland, forgettable work whenever someone else blew a deadline. He thus played an inadvertent part in setting up [Marvel and DC Comics]' creed of speed over quality, and helped establish the Marvel house style, which nurtured some young artists, but acted as an artistic straitjacket for others.

That assessment of Tuska's Marvel work is not widely shared. John Romita Sr., Marvel's de facto and later official art director during this period, found Tuska "so versatile. He could do everything. When Stan knew that a guy could do anything, he used him in every possible, conceivable way. George was a helluva artist and very versatile and very fast. ... He was in demand". Comics writer and Tuska collaborator Tony Isabella wrote, "I would love to see a Best of George Tuska collection which included his crime, mystery, romance, war, and western stories. He brought as much excitement and talent to those genres as he did to superhero comics". Comics journalist and historian Tom Spurgeon wrote that,

... his layouts were certainly more imaginative than the standard at the time, and the way in which characters like Luke Cage held a lot of their strength in their shoulders and punched from their legs up through their torsos betrayed his knowledge of strength and fitness. His signature flourish may have been characters in arrested motion, coiled in preparation for violence like so many pulp heroes of an earlier generation, legs splayed in the form of a near-base ready for what might come next. ... Tuska cemented his reputation as one of the more iconic superhero artists of [the 1970s] — two full generations after entering comics.

=== Later career and death ===
Later, for DC Comics, Tuska drew characters including Superman, Superboy, and Challengers of the Unknown. He had a four-year run drawing The World's Greatest Superheroes comic strip from 1978–1982, inked by Vince Colletta. By this time, his health had become a handicap; Jim Shooter, who scripted an issue of Daredevil penciled by Tuska in 1977, recalled that, "George Tuska was at the end of his brilliant career, he was mostly deaf, communication was difficult, and though he showed occasional flashes of the chops that made him a big name artist in his day, I don't think his work on Daredevil was anywhere near his best." Tuska drew DC's Masters of the Universe limited series in 1982.

Retired from active comics work as of the 2000s, Tuska late in life moved from Hicksville, New York, on Long Island, to Manchester Township, New Jersey, with his wife Dorothy ("Dot"), where he did commissioned art. The couple had three children, Barbara, Kathy and Robert. Tuska died in 2009 "near the stroke of midnight between October 15 and October 16," officially on the latter date. His last published comic-book art was one of four variant covers for Dynamite Entertainment's Masquerade #2 (March 2009).

== Awards ==
Tuska was a 1997 recipient of the industry's Inkpot Award.

== Bibliography ==
Comics work includes:

=== DC Comics ===
- Action Comics #409, 486, 550 (1972–1983)
- Adventure Comics #493–494 (1982)
- The Brave and the Bold #88 (1970)
- Challengers of the Unknown #73–74 (1970)
- Detective Comics #486, 490 (1979–1980)
- Falling In Love #118, 141, 143 (1970–1973)
- Fury of Firestorm #17–18, 31, 45 (1983–1986)
- Ghosts #3–4 (full art); #2 (inks over John Calnan) (1971–1972)
- Girls' Love Stories #144, 152, 154–155, 158, 160, 165 (1969–1972)
- Girls' Romances #147, 150, 154, 157 (1970–1971)
- Green Lantern #166–168, 170 (1983)
- Heart Throbs #128–129 (1970)
- House of Mystery #207, 293–294, 316 (1972–1983)
- House of Secrets #86, 90, 95, 104 (1970–1973)
- Infinity, Inc. #11 (1985)
- Justice League of America #153, 228, 241–243 (1978–1985)
- Legion of Super-Heroes vol. 2 #308 (1984)
- Masters of the Universe #1–3 (1982–1983)
- Mystery in Space #115, 117 (1981)
- Secret Origins vol. 2 #4, 9 (1986)
- Superboy #172–173, 176, 183 (1971–1972)
- Superboy and the Legion of Super-Heroes #235 (1978)
- The Superman Family #203, 207–209 (1980–1981)
- Tales of the Legion of Super-Heroes #314–317 (1984)
- Tales of the Unexpected #34 (1959)
- Teen Titans #27, 31, 33–39 (1971–1972)
- The Unexpected #117–118, 120, 123–124, 127, 129, 132, 134, 136, 139, 152, 180, 200 (1970–1980)
- Weird War Tales #103, 122 (1981–1983)
- Wildcats: Mosaic #1 (2000)
- The Witching Hour #11–12, 19 (1970–1972)
- World's Finest Comics #250–252, 254, 257, 283–284, 308 (1978–1984)
- Young Romance #172 (1971)

=== Fawcett Comics ===
- Captain Marvel Adventures #2–4 (1941)
- Captain Marvel Jr. #10 (1943)
- Master Comics #12–19, 21–23 (1941–1942)

=== Lev Gleason Publications ===
- Black Diamond Western #10, 48 (1949–1954)
- Boy Comics #30, 57, 70, 98, 101, 105, 113, 115 (1946–1955)
- Boy Loves Girl #42, 46 (1954)
- Boy Meets Girl #1 (1950)
- Crime and Punishment #2–3, 28, 30, 33, 42, 64–64, 70 (1948–1954)
- Crime Does Not Pay #22, 47–54, 56–64, 66–68, 71–74, 77–78, 80–81, 86–87, 99, 110, 114, 129–140, Annual #1 (1942–1954)
- Desperado #4 (1948)
- Lovers' Lane #2, 6, 40 (1949–1954)

=== Marvel Comics ===
- 3-D Action #1 (1954)
- Adventures into Terror #14, 18 (1952–1953)
- Adventures into Weird Worlds #1, 12, 15 (1952–1953)
- All-True Crime #48, 51 (1952)
- Amazing Detective Cases #10 (1952)
- Arizona Kid #6 (1952)
- Astonishing #27 (1953)
- Astonishing Tales #5–6 (Doctor Doom); #8 (Gemini) (1971)
- The Avengers #48, 106–107, 135, 137–140, 163 (full art); #47, 51, 53–54 (inks over John Buscema) (1967–1977)
- Battle #11, 15, 23, 30, 32 (1952–1954)
- Battle Action #2, 29 (1952–1957)
- Battle Ground #11, 15–16 (1956–1957)
- Battlefield #3 (1952)
- Battlefront #22, 37 (1954–1955)
- Black Goliath #1–3 (1976)
- Black Rider #12, 18–21 (1951–1954)
- Captain America #215 (full art); #112 (inks over Jack Kirby) (1969–1977)
- Captain Marvel #54 (1978)
- Casey – Crime Photographer #1 (1949)
- Champions #3–4, 6–7, 17 (1976–1978)
- Cowboy Action #11 (1956)
- Creatures on the Loose #30–32 (Man-Wolf) (1974)
- Crime Can't Win #3 (1951)
- Crime Cases Comics #5, 9, 12 (1951–1952)
- Crime Exposed #3–4 (1951)
- Crime Must Lose #9 (1951)
- Daredevil #145, Annual #4 (full art); #39 (inks over Gene Colan) (1968–1977)
- Defenders #57 (1978)
- Dracula Lives! #13 (1975)
- Frontier Western #2, 10 (1956–1957)
- Gambit and the Champions:From the Marvel Vault #1 (2011)
- G.I. Tales #4 (1957)
- Ghost Rider #13–14, 16 (1975–1976)
- Godzilla #2 (inks over Herb Trimpe) (1977)
- Gunhawk #13, 33–34 (1951–1956)
- Hero for Hire #1–3, 5, 7–12 (1972–1973)
- The Incredible Hulk vol. 2 #218 (full art); #102, 105 (inks over Marie Severin); #106 (inks over Herb Trimpe) (1968–1977)
- Iron Man #5–13, 15–23, 32, 38, 40–46, 48–54, 57–61, 63–72, 78–79, 86–92, 95–106, Annual #4 (full art); #24 (inks over Johnny Craig) (1968–1978)
- Journey into Mystery #11 (1953)
- Journey into Unknown Worlds #3, 10, 14 (1951–1952)
- Jungle Action #2 (1954)
- Jungle Tales #2 (1954)
- Justice #15, 18, 31, 33, 37, 40–41, 48 (1950–1954)
- Ka-Zar #2–3 (Angel backup stories) (1970–1971)
- Kent Blake of the Secret Service #5 (1952)
- Kid Colt Outlaw #16, 24, 32, 34–35, 63 (1951–1956)
- Lorna the Jungle Girl #6 (1954)
- Man Comics #1–2 14, 16, 21, 23–24 (1949–1953)
- Marines in Battle #15, 18, 20 (1956–1957)
- Marvel Chillers #7 (Tigra) (1976)
- Marvel Premiere #26 (Hercules) (1975)
- Marvel Super-Heroes #19 (Ka-Zar) (1969)
- Marvel Tales #114 (1953)
- Marvel Tales vol. 2 #30 (Angel backup story) (1971)
- Marvel Treasury Edition #13 (1977)
- Marvel Two-in-One #6 (1974)
- Masters of the Universe The Motion Picture #1 (1987)
- Men in Action #2, 6 (1952)
- Men's Adventures #12, 24 (1952–1953)
- Menace #1–2, 5 (1953)
- Monsters on the Prowl #10 (inks over Don Heck) (1971)
- Monsters on the Prowl #10 (1971)
- Monsters Unleashed #3 (1973)
- My Love #2 (1949)
- My Love vol. 2 #17 (1972)
- My Own Romance #10 (1950)
- Mystery Tales #10, 12, 14 (1953)
- Our Love Story #20 (1972)
- Outlaw Fighters #1–3 (1954)
- Planet of the Apes #1–6 (1974–1975)
- Power Man #17–20, 24, 26, 28–29, 47 (1974–1977)
- Private Eye #1–3 (1951)
- Quick-Trigger Western #17 (1957)
- Rawhide Kid #14 (1957)
- Red Warrior #1 (1951)
- Shanna the She-Devil #1 (1972)
- Space Squadron #1–3 (1951)
- Spaceman #5 (1954)
- Sports Action #7 (1951)
- Spy Cases #7 (1951)
- Spy Fighters #1-2 (1951)
- Strange Tales #1, 12, 14, 18–19, 94, 166 (1951–1968)
- Sub-Mariner #41–42, 69–71 (1971–1974)
- Super-Villain Team-Up #1 (1975)
- Supernatural Thrillers #6 (Headless Horseman) (1973)
- Suspense #5–6, 12, 24 (1950–1952)
- Tales of Justice #57, 61–62 (1955–1956)
- Tales of Suspense #58 (Watcher); #70–71 (full art); 72–74 (inks over Jack Kirby) (Captain America) (1964–1966)
- Texas Kid #1, 6 (1951)
- Tower of Shadows #3 (1970)
- Two-Gun Kid #11, 45 (1953–1958)
- War Action #2, 8, 10 (1952–1953)
- War Adventures #1 (1952)
- War Comics #22 (1953)
- Western Outlaws #2, 6, 15 (1954–1956)
- Western Outlaws and Sheriffs #64, 69–72 (1950–1952)
- What If ... ? #5 (Captain America) (1977)
- Wild Western #21, 27, 29, 32, 37 (1952–1954)
- Worlds Unknown #7–8 (The Golden Voyage of Sinbad adaptation) (1974)
- X-Men #43–46 (full art); #40–42 (inks over Don Heck) (1968)
- Young Men #6–7, 21–23 (1950–1953)

=== Quality Comics ===
- Hit Comics #6–8, 18 (1940–1941)
- National Comics #1–9 (1940–1941)
- Uncle Sam Quarterly #3–4 (1942)

=== Tower Comics ===
- Dynamo #2–3 (1966–1967)
- T.H.U.N.D.E.R. Agents #7–8, 10, 13–17, 19 (1966–1968)

Preceded by Johnny Craig	Iron Man artist 1968–1978	Succeeded by Keith Pollard
Preceded by n/a	Hero for Hire artist 1972–1973	Succeeded by Billy Graham
Preceded by Sal Buscema	The Avengers artist 1975	Succeeded by George Pérez
Preceded by Mike Sekowsky	Justice League of America artist 1985	Succeeded by Joe Staton
