= Western Gunfighters =

- Western Gunfighters #20 (June 1956), the premiere issue Cover art by John Severin.

Publication information
- Publisher: Marvel Comics
- Schedule: Monthly
- Format: Standard
- Publication date: (1st series) June 1956 - August 1957 (2nd series) Aug. 1970 - Nov. 1975
- No. of issues: (1st series) 8 (2nd series) 33

Creative team
- Written by: Stan Lee, Jerry Siegel, Gary Friedrich
- Penciller(s): (1st series) Gene Colan, Joe Maneely, John Severin (2nd series) Dick Ayers, Gil Kane, Severin

Western Gunfighters is the name of two American Western-anthology comic book series published by Marvel Comics and its 1950s forerunner, Atlas Comics.

The initial Atlas series ran eight issues, from 1956 to 1957, and featured artists including Gene Colan, Reed Crandall, Joe Maneely, John Severin, Alex Toth, Al Williamson, and Wally Wood, with many stories written by Stan Lee.

Volume two, published by Marvel from 1970 to 1975, consisted mostly of Western reprints but also featured new material, including stories of the masked Old West hero Ghost Rider and the introductions of such short-lived Western features as "Gunhawk" and "Renegades", by writers including Gary Friedrich and Superman co-creator Jerry Siegel, and artists including Dick Ayers and Tom Sutton.

== Publication history ==
=== Atlas Comics ===
Marvel Comics' first comic book titled Western Gunfighters was an anthology series published by the company's 1950s forerunner, Atlas Comics. It premiered with issue #20 (cover-dated June 1956), taking over the numbering of a previous Atlas series, Apache Kid, the star of which did not go on to appear in the revamped book. Atlas editor-in-chief Stan Lee wrote many of the stories, generally signing them. The artwork included at least two stories each by Dave Berg, Vic Carrabotta, Gene Colan, and Don Heck, and one story each from Reed Crandall, Russ Heath. Angelo Torres, Alex Toth, Al Williamson, Wally Wood, and George Woodbridge. Most covers were by John Severin or Joe Maneely. It ran through issue #27 (Aug. 1957).

The series was one of several Atlas Western anthologies that included Frontier Western, Gunsmoke Western, Western Thrillers, and Wild Western; and two successor series that took over its numbering, Cowboy Action and Quick-Trigger Western.

=== Marvel Comics ===
Marvel's second series of that name was a Western anthology that ran 33 issues (Aug. 1970 - Nov. 1975) and used an almost identical cover logo. Primarily consisting of reprints of Atlas / Marvel Western stories, it also ran new material through issue #7 (Jan. 1972), with the feature "Ghost Rider", a continuation of Marvel's 1967 series, headlining. These first seven issues were 68- or 52-page, 25¢ "giants", relative to the typical 15¢ comics of the times, with #8-on published as standard 36-page comics at the prevailing price of 20¢, rising to 25¢ by the time it ended publication. The premiere issue featured a 10-page Ghost Rider story by the character's 1960s team of writer Gary Friedrich and penciler Dick Ayers, and introduced three new features:

- "Gunhawk", created by writer Jerry Siegel, the co-creator of Superman, and penciler Werner Roth, starred an initially unnamed Old West bounty hunter. The 10-page story marked the first professional comic-book work of artist Sal Buscema, the inker. After Ghost Rider-Gunhawk team-up stories in issues #4-5, the "Gunhawk" feature ran in issues #5-7. After a 28-year hiatus, Gunhawk, his name now given as Lee Barnett, co-starred in the 2000 miniseries Blaze of Glory, where he is killed after murdering Kid Colt by shooting him in the back. Marvel predecessor Atlas Comics had published a short-lived Western title, The Gunhawk, from 1950-1951, starring an unrelated character named Red Larabee.
- "Tales of Fort Rango", by writer Friedrich and artist Syd Shores, starred a post-Civil War U.S. Army officer, Major Brett Sabre, sent to instill order at an undisciplined fort in The Dakotas. The feature did not continue, though the locale of Fort Rango reappeared in the first six issues of Red Wolf, starring a Native American hero. Saber returned decades later in a single 10-page feature, "The Man from Fort Rango!", in the one-shot Western Legends #1 (Sept. 2006).
- "Renegades", created by writers Roy Thomas and Mike Friedrich (no relation to Gary Friedrich) and artist Tom Sutton, concerned a quartet sent out by Colonel William Travis from the Alamo to seek reinforcements, and unjustly branded as cowards. The foursome's only subsequent appearances were in issues #4-5.
- In addition, issue #4 included the one-off "The Outcast", about a "half-breed" Caucasian-Native American. According to a note at the story's end, the feature was "conceived by Roy Thomas and executed by [penciler Barry Windsor-]Smith and [writer Steve] Parkhouse nearly two years ago!"

In issue #6, Marvel's original Western Ghost Rider, Carter Slade, was killed saving his brother Lincoln, a U.S. marshal. In the following issue, his place was taken by his young friend and sidekick, Jaime Jacobs, who was almost immediately killed in action. In that same story, Lincoln Slade became the third Ghost Rider.

Reprinted backup features in the first seven issues variously starred the Apache Kid, the Western Kid, Wyatt Earp, and the Black Rider (renamed Black Mask). The series thereafter became all-reprint. Issues #8-9 featured Black Mask as the lead feature, plus the Apache Kid and the Outlaw Kid. Issues #10-15 swapped gunfighter Matt Slade for the Outlaw Kid. From #16 through the final issue, #33, the lineup was Kid Colt as the starring feature, plus the Apache Kid and the Western Kid, the latter dropping that handle and going by his regular name, Tex Dawson, in a feature called "Gun-Slinger".

Herb Trimpe penciled most of the initial seven issues' covers, with Ayers supplying two and John Severin one. The bulk of the reprint issues' covers were by Gil Kane, with Severin drawing #8-10. The remainder were by a smattering of artists, including Jim Steranko (#14, March 1973).
