= Gunsmoke Western =

American comic book series

- Gunsmoke Western #57 (March 1960), depicting its three primary feature characters. Cover art by Jack Kirby and Dick Ayers

Publication information
- Publisher: Marvel Comics
- Format: Anthology
- Publication date: 1955 - 1963
- No. of issues: 46
- Main character(s): Kid Colt; Wyatt Earp; Two-Gun Kid

Creative team
- Written by: Stan Lee
- Artist(s): Jack Keller; Jack Kirby; Joe Maneely; John Severin

Gunsmoke Western is an American comic book series that was published initially by Atlas Comics, the 1950s forerunner of Marvel Comics, and then into the 1960s by Marvel. A Western anthology that ran 46 issues, it featured early stories of the Marvel Old West heroes Kid Colt and the Two-Gun Kid, and work by such artists as Jack Kirby, John Severin, Joe Maneely, Doug Wildey, and many others.

== Publication history ==
Gunsmoke Western was published by Atlas Comics, the 1950s forerunner of Marvel Comics. It ran 46 issues, taking over the numbering of a previous series, Western Tales of Black Rider, beginning with #32 (cover-dated Dec. 1955). The series, which fell under the Marvel Comics banner with issue #65 (July 1961), ended with #77 (July 1963).

The publication had premiered in 1948 as the superhero comic All Winners, a.k.a. All-Winners Comics, vol. 2, then after one issue immediately became All Western Winners, a.k.a. All-Western Winners, for three issues; Western Winners for three issues; Black Rider for issues #8-27; and Western Tales of Black Rider for #28-31. The series was one of several Atlas Westerns that included Frontier Western; Western Gunfighters; and Western Thrillers and two successor series that took over its numbering, Cowboy Action and Quick-Trigger Western.

With the change to Gunsmoke Western, the series began starring Kid Colt, drawn by its longtime artist Jack Keller. The lesser-known Atlas frontiersman character Billy Bucksin served as a backup feature for three issues, with anthological Western stories in-between. Issue #35 (June 1956) introduced the backup feature "Wyatt Earp", starring a version of the real-life lawman, for two issues before back-up features were dropped in favor of Kid Colt plus standalone stories. The Earp feature returned in issue #43 (Nov. 1957), running as backup (and in one instance as the lead feature) through #58 (May 1960).

Clay Harder, introduced in 1948 as the first of Marvel's two Western heroes called the Two-Gun Kid, was re-imainged and reintroduced in Gunsmoke Western #57 (March 1960), in a feature by writer-editor Stan Lee and artist John Severin. The feature ran through #63 (March 1961). The second Two-Gun Kid, Matt Hawk, would be introduced in Two-Gun Kid #60 (Nov. 1962), which retconned that Clay Harder was merely a dime novel fictional character who inspired Hawk to become a masked Western crimefighter.

Occasional stories starred the Ringo Kid, the Gunsmoke Kid, and others.

All cover art through issue #50 (Jan. 1959) was by either Severin or Joe Maneely, except for one each by Russ Heath, Sol Brodsky, and Jack Davis. Afterward, all covers were penciled by Jack Kirby save for one each by Davis and Maneely. A wide range of artists drew the interior stories, with multiples drawn by artists including Keller, Kirby, Severin, Dick Ayers, Gene Colan, Don Heck, and Al Williamson, and at least two each by Matt Baker, Mort Drucker, Angelo Torres, George Tuska, and Doug Wildey, among others. Spider-Man co-creator Steve Ditko, outside his normal realm of superhero and fantasy tales, drew one Gunsmoke Western story, "The Escape of Yancy Younger", written by Lee, in issue #66 (Sept. 1961).

== See also ==
- The Mighty Marvel Western
