= Western Kid =

Fictional character

The Western Kid
- The Western Kid #1 (Nov. 1954). Cover art by John Romita Sr.

Publication information
- Publisher: Marvel Comics
- First appearance: The Western Kid #1 (Nov. 1954)
- Created by: John Romita Sr. (art)

In-story information
- Alter ego: Tex Dawson
Western Kid
Publication information
- Publisher: Atlas Comics
- Schedule: Bimonthly
- Format: Ongoing series
- Genre: Western
- Publication date: Dec. 1954 – Aug. 1957
- No. of issues: 17
- Main character: Western Kid
Creative team
- Artist: John Romita, Sr.

The Western Kid is a fictional Old West character appearing in American comic books published by Marvel Comics. The character was the star of Western feature published by Marvel's 1950s precursor, Atlas Comics.

== Publication history ==
Tex Dawson, the Western Kid, debuted in Western Kid #1 (cover-dated Nov. 1954), from publisher Atlas Comics, a predecessor of Marvel Comics. The character was created by an unknown writer and penciler-inker John Romita Sr., who the following decade would become one of Spider-Man's signature artists. The feature, drawn exclusively by Romita, ran through issue #17 (Aug. 1957), with cover art by Romita, Joe Maneely, John Severin, and, for one cover each, Carl Burgos, Russ Heath, and Syd Shores.

Western Kid reprints appeared in Marvel's 1970s omnibus series Western Gunfighters #3–6 and 17–33 (Dec.1970 – Sept. 1971, Sept. 1973 – Nov. 1975). In-between, the character starred in the reprint series The Western Kid vol. 2, #1–5 (Dec. 1971 – Aug. 1972) — the first issue of which sported a new cover by original artist Romita — and in Rawhide Kid #105 (Nov. 1972) and Gun-Slinger #1–3 (Jan.-June 1973), a series reflecting the character's temporary new name. The first issue, with a cover drawn by Jim Steranko, was titled Tex Dawson, Gun-Slinger. The character was mentioned for the last time in the volume Marvel Westerns Outlaw Files(2006), as an aging old legend, with movies with his name.

== Fictional character biography ==
Tex Dawson, a.k.a. the Western Kid, was a clean-cut Old West gunfighter with a stallion named Whirlwind and a white German Shepherd dog named Lightning. Unlike such fellow Atlas Western stars as Kid Colt and the Rawhide Kid, he was not hunted by the law for a perceived crime, and unlike the Two-Gun Kid or the Outlaw Kid, he wore no mask. Wandering the range as a do-gooder adventurer, the Western Kid was respected by sheriffs and marshals, whom he often helped, and idolized by children.

== Other versions ==
A modern-day version of the character stars in the five-issue ensemble miniseries Six Guns (#1–4 cover-dated Jan.-March 2012), by writer Andy Diggle and artist Davide Gianfelice, and also starring the extant female mercenary Tarantula and new contemporary versions of the Marvel Old West heroes the Black Rider; Matt Slade; and the Two-Gun Kid.
