= Ringo Kid =

The Ringo Kid
- First appearance: Splash page of The Ringo Kid Western #1 (Aug. 1954). Art by Joe Maneely.

Publication information
- Publisher: Marvel Comics
- First appearance: The Ringo Kid Western #1 (Aug. 1954)
- Created by: Unknown writer and Joe Maneely

In-story information
- Full name: (Unknown first name) Rand
- Partnerships: Dull Knife (sidekick); Arab (horse)
- Abilities: Proficient with bow and gun. Hand-to-hand combat. Expert horseman.
The Ringo Kid
Publication information
- Schedule: Monthly
- Format: Ongoing series
- Genre: Western
- Publication date: Aug. 1954 – Sept. 1957
- No. of issues: 21
- Main character(s): Ringo Kid, Dull Knife, Arab
Creative team
- Artist(s): Joe Maneely, Fred Kida
- Editor: Stan Lee

The Ringo Kid is a fictional Western character appearing in American comic books published by Marvel Comics. His comic book series was originally released by the company's 1950s predecessor, Atlas Comics. The character is depicted as having a Caucasian father and a Native American mother. A lesser-known character than the company's Kid Colt, Rawhide Kid, or Two-Gun Kid, he also appeared in a reprint series in the 1970s.

The character is unrelated to the actor John Wayne's "Ringo Kid" in the Western film Stagecoach.

== Publication history ==
Atlas Comics' Ringo Kid debuted in the first issue of a series billed on its trademarked cover logo as Ringo Kid for all but two issues (#1 and #3, cover-billed as Ringo Kid Western). Created by an unknown writer and artist Joe Maneely, it ran 21 issues (cover-dated Aug. 1954 – Sept. 1957), drawn primarily by either Maneely or Fred Kida. Stories also ran occasionally in Wild Western, beginning with issue #38 (Nov. 1954), initially drawn by Maneely, with artist John Severin taking the reins in at least issues #46-47 (Nov. 1955 – Jan. 1956). Ringo was the lead feature in the two-issue anthology series Western Trails #1-2 (May & July 1957). He also appears on the cover of Wild Western #39 (Dec. 1954), but not in an interior story.

A five-page story entitled "The Ringo Kid" in Atlas' Western Outlaws & Sheriffs #73 (June 1952) is unrelated, as is the four-page story "Ringo Kid" in Wild Western #26 (Feb. 1953).

Marvel reprinted the series in Ringo Kid vol. 2, #1-30 (Jan. 1970 – Nov. 1976), often with the original Maneely covers. Issues #8 and #9 had new stories in the form of inventory stories from the 1950s only published in that volume. The Ringo Kid made his first appearance in the broader Marvel Universe in a time travel tale in the superhero-team comic The Avengers #142 (Dec. 1975)

Marvel writer Steve Englehart planned a revival series at about this time, with art by Dick Ayers: "Every series I did took off so Marvel kept giving me more. I relaunched this classic Western — always my favorite of Marvel's true cowboy heroes (as opposed to the Two-Gun Kid, whom I also liked but who was more a superhero) — with classic Western artist Dick Ayres [sic]. But after this first issue was drawn and scripted, Marvel decided to do more superheroes and fewer cowboys, so it was set aside before inking".

== Fictional character biography ==
The Ringo Kid, dressed all in black, is a heroic gunslinger of the 19th-century American Old West with a Caucasian father, Cory Rand, and a Native American mother, Dawn Star, variously referred to as a Comanche or a Cheyenne "princess of her tribe despite the fact that the very idea of princesses was alien to that culture, imagined by settlers of European extraction, projecting their notions of royalty onto the natives." He was treated as an outcast because of his mixed heritage, and on the run after being falsely accused of a crime. He traveled with his sidekick Dull Knife. Dull Knife was of the same heritage as his mother's people. Ringo roamed the frontier atop his horse named Arab. His specific mission or goal appears not to have been stated explicitly, but there is intimation of some law-enforcement function: As many covers note breathlessly, "Ringo!" is "The name that makes killers tremble!"
