= Wild Western (comics) =

- Wild Western #3 (Sept. 1948), the first issue published under the title. Cover art by Syd Shores.

Publication information
- Publisher: Atlas Comics
- Schedule: Bi-monthly
- Format: Anthology42
- Publication date: Spring 1948 – Sept. 1957
- No. of issues: 57
- Main character(s): Kid Colt, Two-Gun Kid, Black Rider

Creative team
- Written by: Stan Lee
- Artist(s): Ross Andru, Dick Ayers, Dave Berg, John Forte, Tom Gill, Al Hartley, Russ Heath, Jack Keller, Joe Maneely, Chuck Miller, Jay Scott Pike, Werner Roth, Syd Shores, Joe Sinnott, Chic Stone, Pete Tumlinson, George Tuska
- Editor: Stan Lee

Wild Western (originally titled Wild West) is a Western comic book series that was published by Atlas Comics, the 1950s forerunner of Marvel Comics. The anthology series published 57 issues from 1948 to 1957. Kid Colt stories were usually the lead feature and a prominent cover element throughout the series' run, while most issues also featured the Two-Gun Kid and the Black Rider. Other recurring characters included Tex Taylor, Arizona Annie, the Apache Kid, and the Ringo Kid.

== Publication history ==
The series published two issues as Wild West before changing its title to Wild Western. It was edited throughout by Stan Lee, who also contributed a number of stories as writer.

The primary recurring feature was "Kid Colt", which generally led each issue of Wild Western while simultaneously starring in his own title.

Other features starred the first of several Marvel characters dubbed the Two-Gun Kid, Clay Harder, who appeared in most issues from #1-42; the vigilante Tex Taylor, introduced in Wild West #1 and appearing through #11, when he was renamed as the "Prairie Kid" for a new short-lived feature; the female gunslinger Arizona Annie, who appeared in the first four issues before replaced by the Black Rider through #50; the Apache Kid in issues #15-22; and the Ringo Kid from #38 until the end of the book's run, initially drawn by Joe Maneely, with John Severin taking the reins in at least issues #46-47.

Other recurring features included "Tex Morgan", "Blaze Carson", "The Gunhawk", the "Arizona Kid", the "Texas Kid", and "Arrowhead".
