= Pete Tumlinson =

American comic book artist (1920–2008)

- Born: Howard Peter Tumlinson; June 7, 1920
- Died: June 5, 2008 (aged 87)
- Areas: Penciller, Inker
- Notable works: Kid Colt

Howard Peter Tumlinson (June 7, 1920 – June 5, 2008) was an American comic book artist whose work appeared from the late 1940s through the 1950s in titles published by the Marvel Comics predecessors Timely Comics and Atlas Comics, and a book illustrator. His comics work includes most of the early stories of the Western hero Kid Colt.

== Biography ==
=== Early life and career ===
Kid Colt, Outlaw #14 (May 1951). Cover art by Tumlinson.

Pete Tumlinson was born in Glasgow, Montana, one of four sons of, along with Jack, Dick and Robert, of O. G. and Maude Weaver Tumlinson. Tumlinson attended Texas A&M University, where he originated the cartoon character "Ol' Sarge", who became an unofficial student mascot adorning the likes of stickers and coffee mugs decades later. Tumlinson then did military service in World War II, serving as a pilot for SHAEF, the Supreme Headquarters Allied Expeditionary Force.

His earliest confirmed comic-book work is penciling "I Hate My Husband!", an eight-page story (either co-penciled with or inked by George Klein) in the Timely Comics romance title My Own Romance #7 (July 1949). Other early credits include stories in such Western-romance comics as Cowboy Romances #3 (March 1950) and, tentatively credited, Rangeland Love #2 (March 1950). Some sources credit Tumlinson with a small amount of work on the masked-crimefighter series Blonde Phantom in 1948, and in the mythological-superheroine series Venus #6 (Aug. 1949). Another source cites early, uncredited work in D.S. Publishing's 1948-1949 crime comic Gangsters Can't Win and the Western feature "Nuggets Nugent" in Orbit Publications' 1948-1951 The Westerner Comics.

=== Atlas Comics ===
Astonishing #30 (Feb. 1954): Horrific pre-Code panel, signed by Tumlinson

Shortly after this, publisher Martin Goodman's comics division had gone from being known as Timely Comics to Atlas Comics. There Tumlinson was the primary artist on Kid Colt, Outlaw from issues #14-24 (May 1951 - Jan. 1953) before turning over the reins, figuratively speaking, to the character's longtime signature artist, Jack Keller. Tumlinson had previously drawn an anthological Western story, "The Magic of Manitou", for Kid Colt, Outlaw #13 (March 1951). Later, Tumlinson drew Western stories for Atlas' Outlaw Fighters, Two-Gun Western and Wild Western.

With the popularity of horror comics in the early to mid-1950s, Tumlinson produced a number of horror stories for Atlas titles including Astonishing, Journey into Mystery, Journey Into Unknown Worlds, Marvel Tales, Mystery Tales, Mystic, Strange Tales, and Uncanny Tales. One story, "In the Dead of Night" by writer Hank Chapman and artist Tumlinson, appeared in issue #11 (Nov. 1951) of Suspense, an anthology based on the CBS radio program.

His work in other genres spanned from stories in war comics, such as Battle, to the Biblical story "Cain and Abel" in Bible Tales for Young Folk #5 (March 1954). Tumlinson's last recorded comics credit is the four-page story "The Last Chance", in Marvel Tales #141 (Dec. 1955).

=== Later career and death ===
Tumlinson left comics after the mid-1950s to work in book illustration. He was living in Cameron, Texas at the time of his death.
