= Tumlinson =

Tumlinson is a surname. Notable people with the surname include:

- Pete Tumlinson (1920–2008), American comic book artist
- Rick Tumlinson, American space entrepreneur
