= Robin Hood Raider =

Robin Hood Raider is a fictional character appearing in American comic books published by Marvel Comics. The character first appeared in Kid Colt, Outlaw #139 (March 1968).

== Fictional character biography ==
Robin Hood Raider was a criminal skilled with the bow and arrow, and was defeated by Kid Colt.
