= Arizona Annie =

Comic book character

Publication information
- Publisher: Marvel Comics
- First appearance: Wild West #1 (Spring 1948)
- Created by: Mike Sekowsky; Frank Giacoia

In-story information
- Partnerships: Kid Colt
- Notable aliases: The Arizona Girl
- Abilities: Expert at armed combat

Arizona Annie, also known as The Arizona Girl, is a fictional Old West female gunslinger appearing in American comic books published by Marvel Comics. She debuted in Wild West #1 (Spring 1948) and was created by Mike Sekowsky and Frank Giacoia.

== Fictional character biography ==
Arizona Girl was a spunky and strong cowgirl who travelled across the Old West, fighting criminals. In her earlier days, Annie and her then boyfriend Slim Smith were having the horseshoes on their horses reshoed by a woman-hating blacksmith named Pete Grimm who would not work on Annie's horse. Later that night, he was robbed which led to Annie apprehending the criminal. Pete then withdrew his negative comments towards Annie. Then she exposed a land developer named Josiah Cleek, who was heading a shoddy operation in Sterling Wells.

When Annie was accused of being the leader of a gang due to them being led by a woman, Annie later discovered that it was a criminal named Pretty Face Grimes who was dressed in drag. Annie apprehended the gang and exposed Grimes. When she was being pressured into covering for the previous teacher until a new one can be found, Annie apprehended the bank robbers that tried to hide in the school, accidentally arresting the new teacher in the process.

Slim and his friends later made a joke that Annie was in love with an outlaw named Grizzly Williams. This was proven false when Annie defeated Williams.

Annie later took part in politics when Slim egged her into doing something that a man can do. While she did win an election, she discovered that the local dog catcher had tricked her into running. Annie had Slim and the mayor paraded around in the dog catcher's carriage.

Annie later visited a carnival where the owners of a shooting gallery have rigged it. Afterwards, she worked as a teacher again after the last one got married. At some point, she and Slim separated.

During the late 19th century, Annie had left Slim and developed a relationship with Kid Colt. The two of them visited the town of Wilcox, where they find that its citizens are actually Skrulls in disguise. Upon the Skrulls being exposed, Annie and Kid Colt drove them out of town.

== Powers and abilities ==
Arizona Annie is an expert at armed combat.

=== Equipment ===
Arizona Annie is known to wield colt revolvers and a rifle in battle.

== In other media ==
Arizona Annie appears in Lego Marvel Super Heroes 2, voiced by Melli Bond.
