= Tex Taylor (comics) =

Publication information
- Publisher: Atlas Comics / Marvel Comics
- First appearance: Wild West #1 (Spring 1948)
Tex Taylor
Publication information
- Publisher: Atlas Comics
- Schedule: Bimonthly
- Format: Ongoing series
- Genre: Western
- Publication date: Sept. 1948 – Mar. 1950
- No. of issues: 9
- Main character(s): Tex Taylor
Creative team
- Artist(s): Syd Shores
- Editor(s): Stan Lee

Tex Taylor is the title of a Western comic book that was published by Marvel Comics from 1948 to 1950. The eponymous star was a vigilante who hunted criminals all over the American West.

As a young man, Tex lived with his father, the best cattleman in this state, on their ranch in Whisperin' Valley, near Wishbone, Texas. One day the head of the "Cattlemen's Protection League" attempted to extort protection money from Tex's father. His father refused and the head of the League rode off, threatening him. Soon after, Tex joined the Army during the Civil War. While away, Tex received a letter saying that his father had been killed and that he had sold the ranch to the League before his demise.

Tex returned to find that the head of the League had rigged an election and became sheriff, afterwards forcing Tex's father to sign the ranch over to him, and then had him killed. Tex investigated matters and discovered that the town mayor was responsible for everything. The mayor was interested in the gold deposits on the ranch of Tex's father. Tex killed the mayor, and then vowed to spend his life hunting criminals all over the west and destroying them.
