= Western comics =

Comic genre

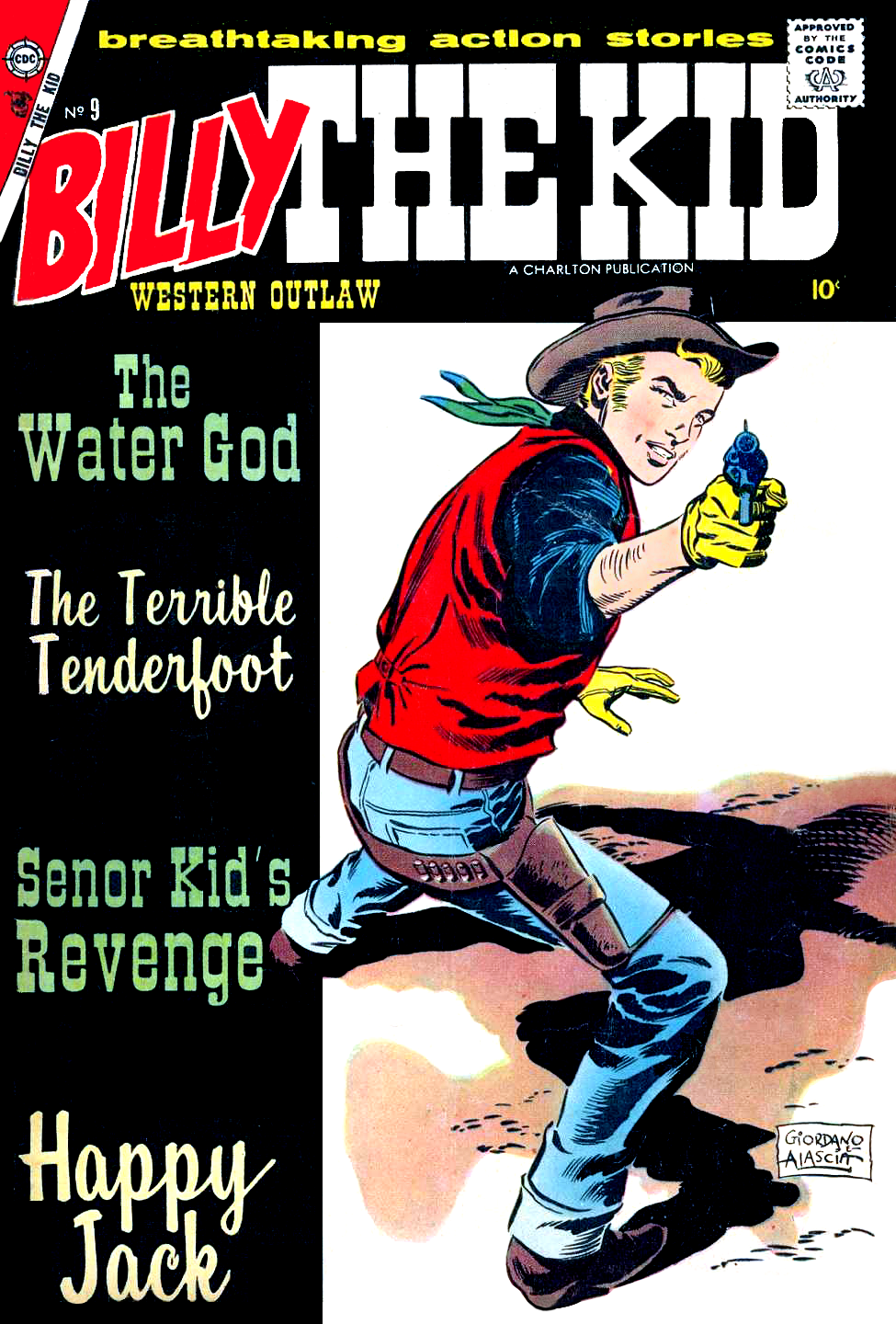
- Charlton Comics' Billy the Kid #9 (November 1957). Cover art by Dick Giordano and Vince Alascia.
- Authors: Tom Gill; Fred Guardineer; Paul S. Newman; Carl Pfeufer; Pete Tumlinson
- Publishers: Marvel Comics; Charlton Comics; DC Comics; Fawcett Comics; Magazine Enterprises
- Publications: Kid Colt Outlaw; Billy the Kid; All-Star Western; Two-Gun Kid; Rawhide Kid

Subgenres
- Weird West

Western comics is a comics genre usually depicting the American Old West frontier (usually anywhere west of the Mississippi River) and typically set during the late nineteenth century. The term is generally associated with an American comic books genre published from the late 1940s through the 1950s (though the genre had continuing popularity in Europe, and persists in limited form in American comics today). Western comics of the period typically featured dramatic scripts about cowboys, gunfighters, lawmen, bounty hunters, outlaws, and Native Americans. Accompanying artwork depicted a rural America populated with such iconic images as guns, cowboy hats, vests, horses, saloons, ranches, and deserts, contemporaneous with the setting.

== Origins ==
Western novels, films, and pulp magazines were extremely popular in the United States from the late 1930s to the 1960s.

Western comics first appeared in newspaper strips in the early 1900s. One of the first examples was Lariat Pete, a humorous strip created by John Campbell Cory, which circulated from 1901 to 1903 and was occasionally illustrated by Dan McCarthy and George Herriman. Victor Forsythe also introduced humorous takes on the genre with Bad Bill the Western Wildcat (1911) and Tenderfoot Tim (1912–1914), both published in the New York World. In October 1927, J. Carrol Mansfield, best known for the educational strip High Lights of History (1924–1942), launched Buffalo Bill, Scout of Scouts, a daily continuity strip recounting the formative years of young Billy Cody. In June 1927, Harry O'Neill's Young Buffalo Bill (later changed to Buckaroo Bill and then, finally, Broncho Bill), distributed by United Feature Syndicate. After O’Neill’s departure, Fred Meagher continued the feature briefly, and the title was later replaced by the actual Buffalo Bill strips (1950–1956).

Starting in the 1938, Red Ryder, Little Joe, and King of the Royal Mounted were syndicated in hundreds of newspapers across the United States. Garrett Price's White Boy (later changed to Skull Valley) was another syndicated strip from the 1930s.

The first Western stories to appear in the comic books were in the mid-1930s: National Allied's New Fun Comics #1 (Feb. 1935) ran the modern-West feature "Jack Woods" and the Old West feature "Buckskin Jim"; Centaur Publications' The Comics Magazine #1 (May 1936) ran the feature "Captain Bill of the Rangers"; and David McKay Publications's Feature Book #1 (May 1937) and a single issue of King Comics (also 1937) featured King of the Royal Mounted reprints before Dell took over licensing of the character. Dell Comics' The Funnies published a run of short adaptations of B-movie Westerns starting in vol. 2, issue #20 (May 1938). Whitman Comics' Crackajack Funnies ran regular Western features (including Tom Mix stories) beginning with issue #1 in June 1938.

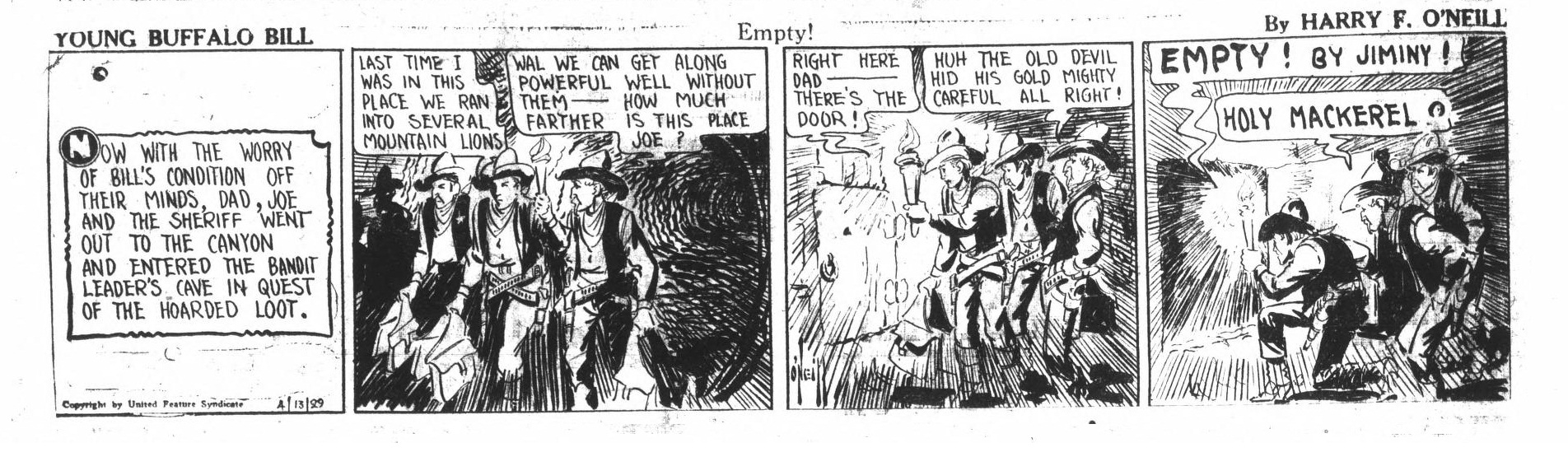
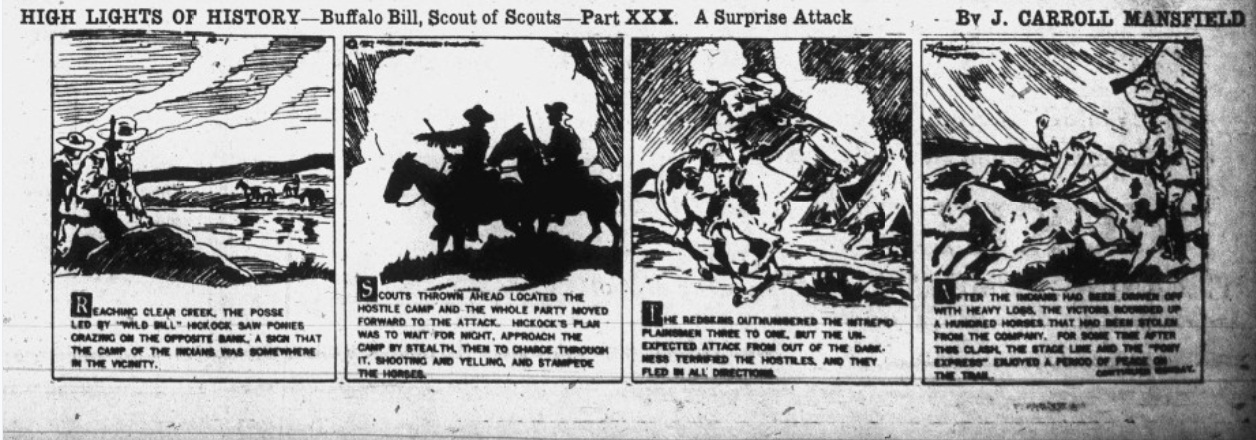
Young Buffalo Bill and Buffalo Bill Scout of Scout, two pioneers strips

The first stand-alone Western comics titles were published by Centaur Publications. Star Ranger and Western Picture Stories both debuted from the publisher in late 1936, cover-dated Feb. 1937. Star Ranger ran for 12 issues, becoming Cowboy Comics for a couple of issues, and then becoming Star Ranger Funnies. The series ended in October 1939. Western Picture Stories ran four issues in 1937. Dell Comics published Western Action Thrillers #1 shortly thereafter (cover-date Apr. 1937), and began publishing Red Ryder Comics, initially reprinting the long-running comic strip, in 1941. Edward “Tex” O’Reilly, the creator of the fakelore figure Pecos Bill, collaborated on the Pecos Bill comic strip with cartoonist Jack A. Warren (also known as Alonzo Vincent Warren) distributed by George Matthew Adams Service from 1936 to 1937.

In 1939, the Associated Features Syndicate, run by Robert W. Farrell, launched the newspaper strip Lightnin' and Lone Rider. Written by Farrell and illustrated by two young artists at the beginning artist: Jack Kirby and Frank Robbins, the strip was later reprinted in Eastern Color Printing's Famous Funnies.

== "Golden Age": 1948–1960 ==
Western comics became popular in the years immediately following World War II, when superheroes went out of style. Adult readership had grown during the war years, and returning servicemen wanted subjects other than superheroes in their books. The popularity of the Western genre in comic strips and other media gave birth to Western comics, many of which began being published around 1948.

Most of the larger publishers of the period jumped headfirst into the Western arena during this period, particularly Marvel Comics and its forerunners Timely Comics and Atlas Comics. Kid Colt Outlaw debuted in 1948, running until 1979 (though it was primarily a reprint title after 1967). The company soon established itself as the most prolific publisher of Western comics with other notable long-running titles, including Rawhide Kid, Two-Gun Kid, and Wild Western.

The six-issue 1950 Harvey Comics series Boys' Ranch, by Joe Simon and Jack Kirby, was a seminal example of the Western comics genre. DC Comics published the long-running series All-Star Western and Western Comics. Charlton Comics published Billy the Kid, Cheyenne Kid, Outlaws of the West, Texas Rangers in Action, and the unusual title Black Fury, about a horse that roamed the West righting wrongs. Both Dell Comics and Fawcett Comics published a number of Western titles, including The Lone Ranger (Dell) and Hopalong Cassidy (Fawcett, later continued by DC after Fawcett folded in 1953). Many issues of Dell's Four Color featured Western stories during the 1950s. Avon Comics published a number of Western comics, the most notable titles being based on historical figures like Jesse James and Wild Bill Hickok. Youthful published the Western titles Gunsmoke, Indian Fighter, and Redskin (later known as Famous Western Badmen). And Toby Press published its own Billy the Kid Adventure Magazine.

However, this popularity drew the attention of psychiatrist Fredric Wertham, whose book Seduction of the Innocent (1954), he argued that most Westerns were nothing more than crime stories in different clothing. He also condemned the advertisements for guns and knives in these magazines, arguing that this association between advertising and violence helped normalize aggressive attitudes among young readers. His moralist campaign, combined with U.S. Senate hearings, led to the creation of the Comics Code Authority (CCA) in 1954, a strict censorship code that devastated the Western genre. The Code's rules were designed to respond directly to Wertham's criticisms, banning excessive violence, torture, bloodshed, corrupt authority figures, moral ambiguity in heroes, horror, the supernatural, and the sensual portrayal of women.

=== Characters ===
The first Western hero published by Timely Comics was the Masked Raider, beginning in 1939.

Timely/Atlas/Marvel favored Western characters with the word "Kid" in their name, including the Apache Kid, Kid Colt, the Outlaw Kid, the Rawhide Kid, the Ringo Kid, the Two-Gun Kid, and the Western Kid—as well as the more obscure heroes the Prairie Kid, the Arizona Kid, and the Texas Kid. Other companies followed suit, with DC's Stuff the Chinatown Kid and the Wyoming Kid; Charlton Comics' Billy the Kid and the Cheyenne Kid; and Dell's the Cisco Kid.

Black Rider and Phantom Rider were two other Marvel company characters from the genre's peak. Other early DC Comics Western characters included Johnny Thunder, Nighthawk, Pow Wow Smith, Tomahawk, the Trigger Twins, and Vigilante. A new version of the Lone Rider was launched in 1951 by Robert W. Farrell through his publishing house, Farrell Publications. The character was subsequently relaunched under the title The Rider in 1957.

In 1950, the Pittsburgh Courier, a newspaper geared toward Black audiences, launched a new color comic section through the Smith-Mann Syndicate, which supplied several strips featuring Black characters. Among them was The Chisholm Kid, a comic strip about a Black cowboy illustrated by Carl Pfeufer, the longtime artist of Fawcett's Tom Mix comics. The strip ran in the newspaper from August 19, 1950, to August 11, 1956.

Dell Comics, known for publishing The Lone Ranger, introduced Lobo in 1965 . Created by D. J. Arneson and Tony Tallarico, this Western hero is widely regarded as the medium's first African-American character to headline his own comic book series, making him the second Black Western protagonist in comics history, following The Chisholm Kid.

==== Cowboy actor comics ====
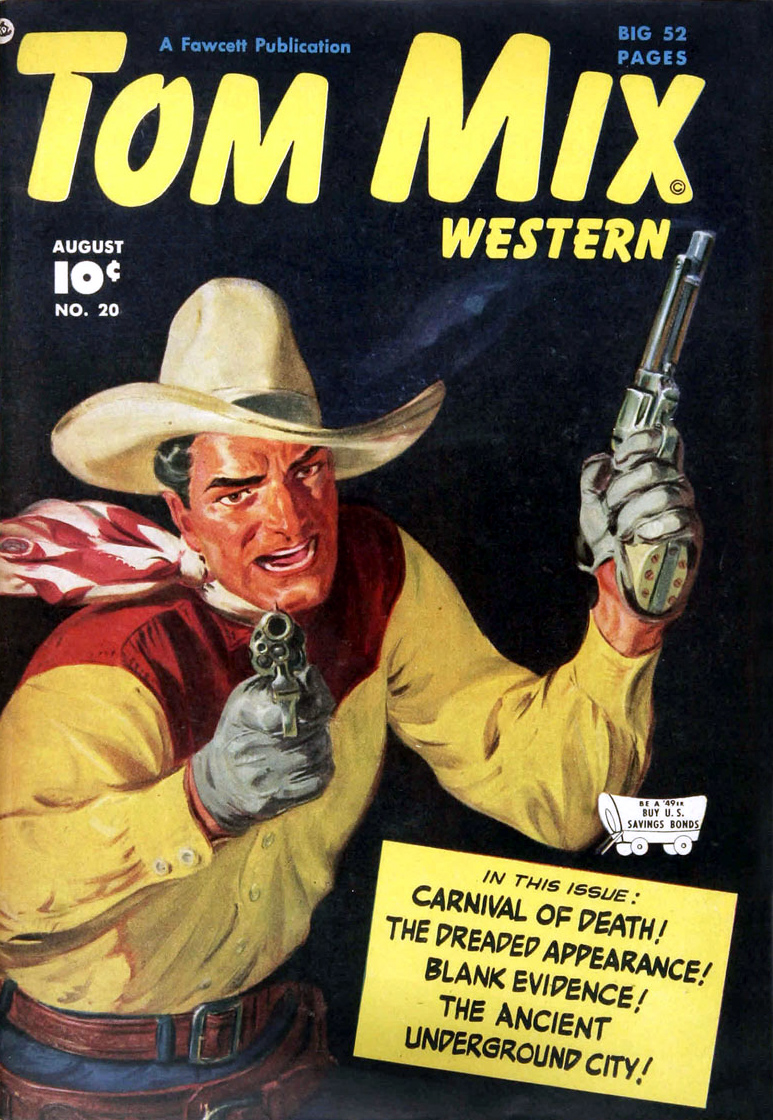
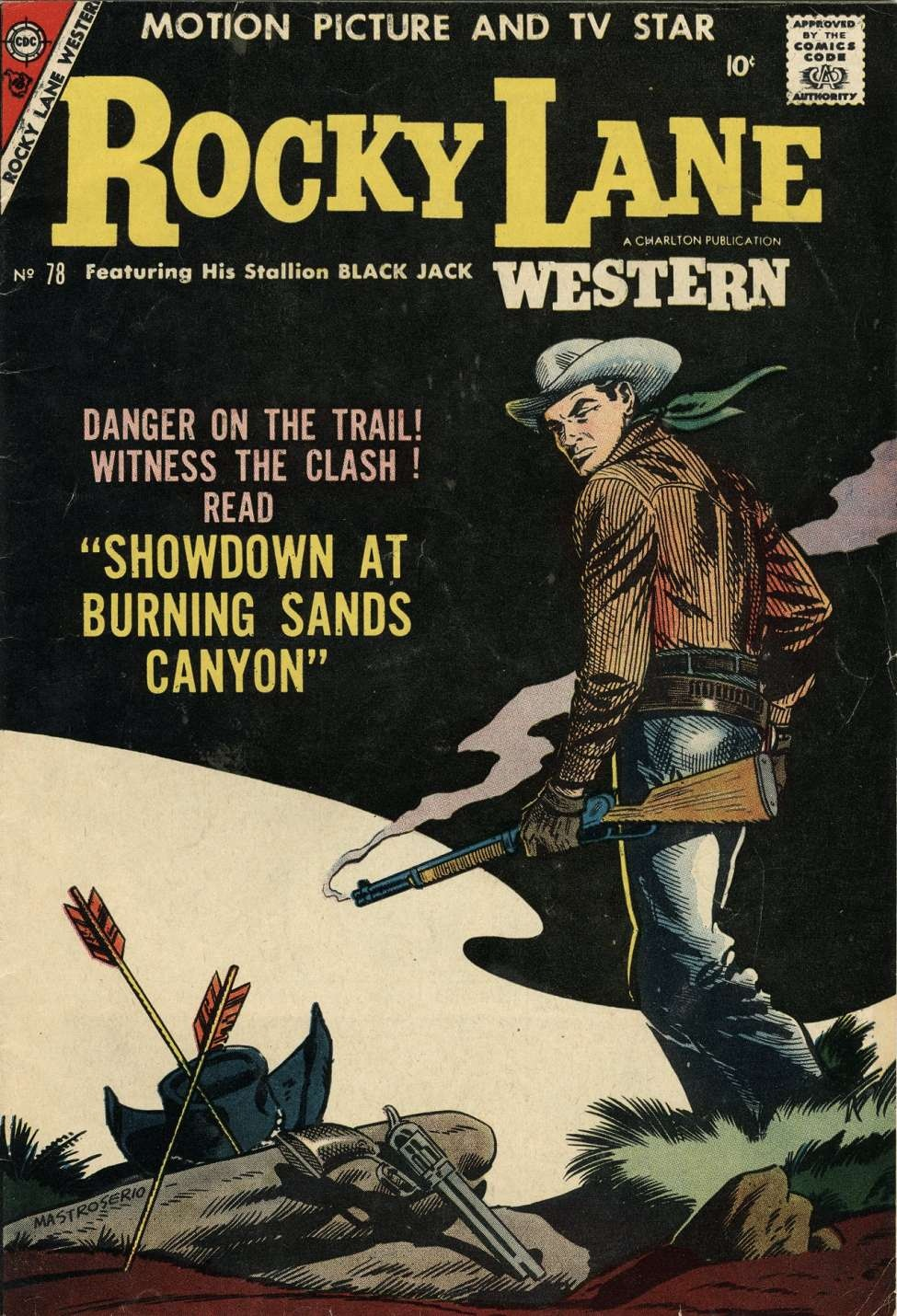
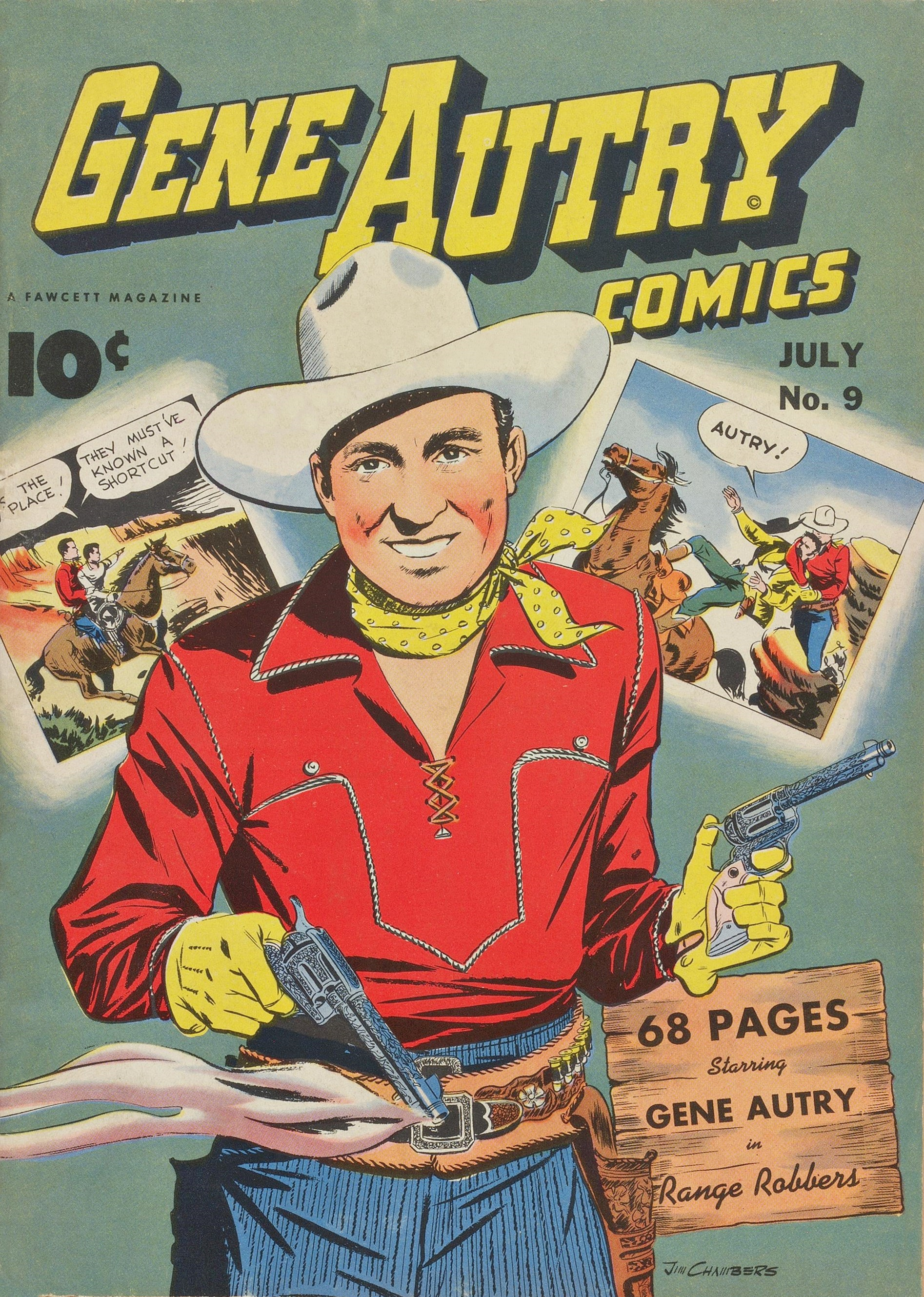
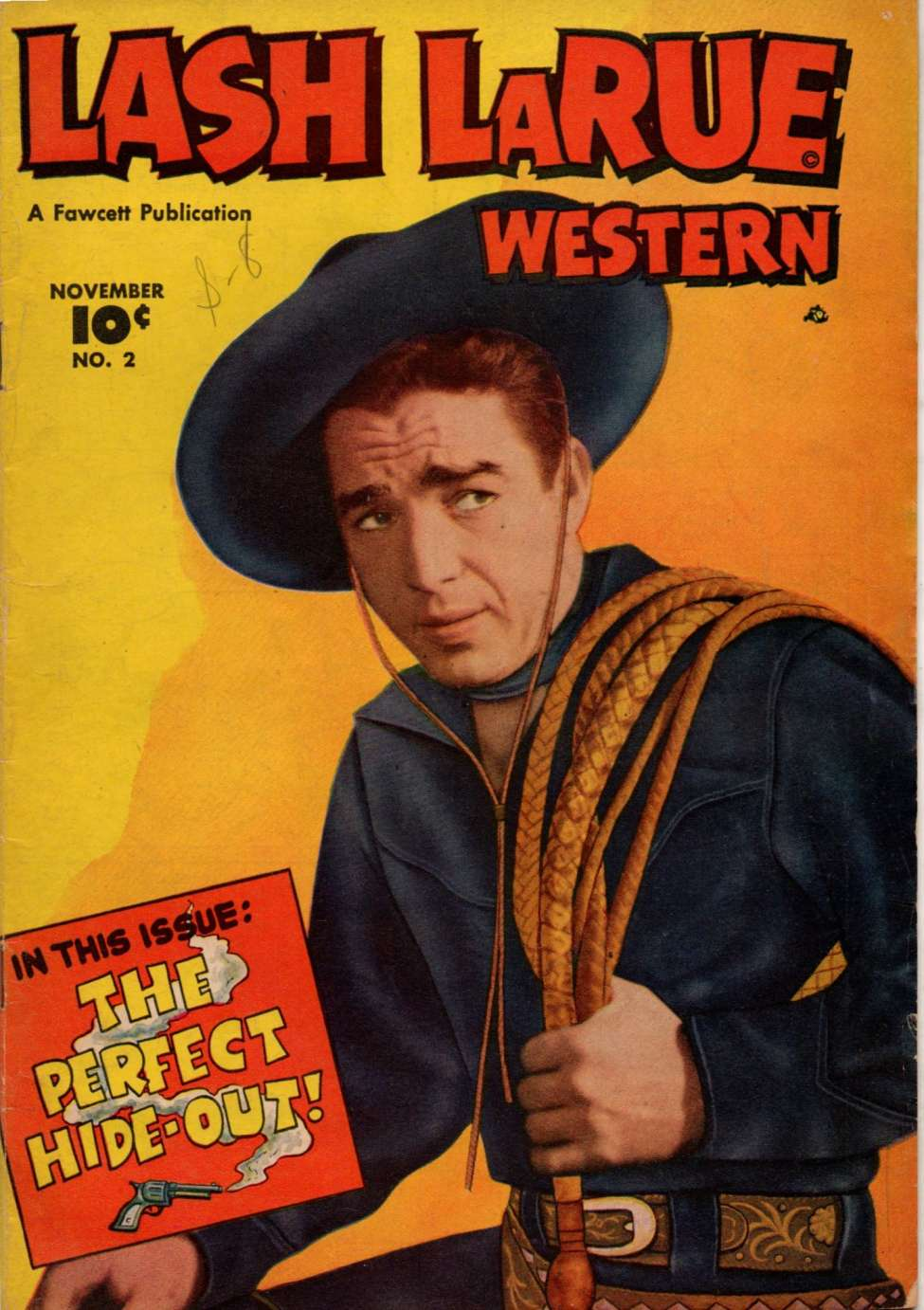
Tom Mix, Rocky Lane, Gene Autry and Lash Larue comic books

Tom Mix's prolific comic book presence was an extension of his popular radio show, The Tom Mix Ralston Straight Shooters (1933–1951), in which actors voiced his part. This radio success directly spawned his first comics: a single-page advertisement in New Fun #1 (February 1935) where the cowboy star endorsed "official Tom Mix Zyp-Guns." His first proper narrative appearances followed in Dell Comics' The Comics, Popular Comics and Crackajack Funnies from 1936 to 1939. This was succeeded by a direct mail-order series from Ralston Purina, the sponsor of his popular radio series; from 1940 to 1942, the company produced nine issues of Tom Mix Comics and three issues of Tom Mix Commandos Comics, available to fans in exchange for cereal boxtops.

The years 1946–1949 saw an explosion of titles "starring" Western film actors and cowboy singers. Almost every star, major or minor, had their own title at some point; and almost every publisher got in on the action: Fawcett published Allan Lane, Monte Hale, Gabby Hayes, Lash LaRue, Tex Ritter, and Tom Mix comics; Dell published Gene Autry, Rex Allen, Roy Rogers, and Wild Bill Elliott comics; Magazine Enterprises published Charles Starrett and Tim Holt comics; Toby Press published a John Wayne title; and DC produced short-lived Dale Evans and Jimmy Wakely titles. (Dale Evans and Reno Browne were the only two Western actresses to have comics based on their characters.) Most of the cowboy actor titles featured photo covers of the stars; most series had been canceled by 1957.

==== Faux cowboy actors ====
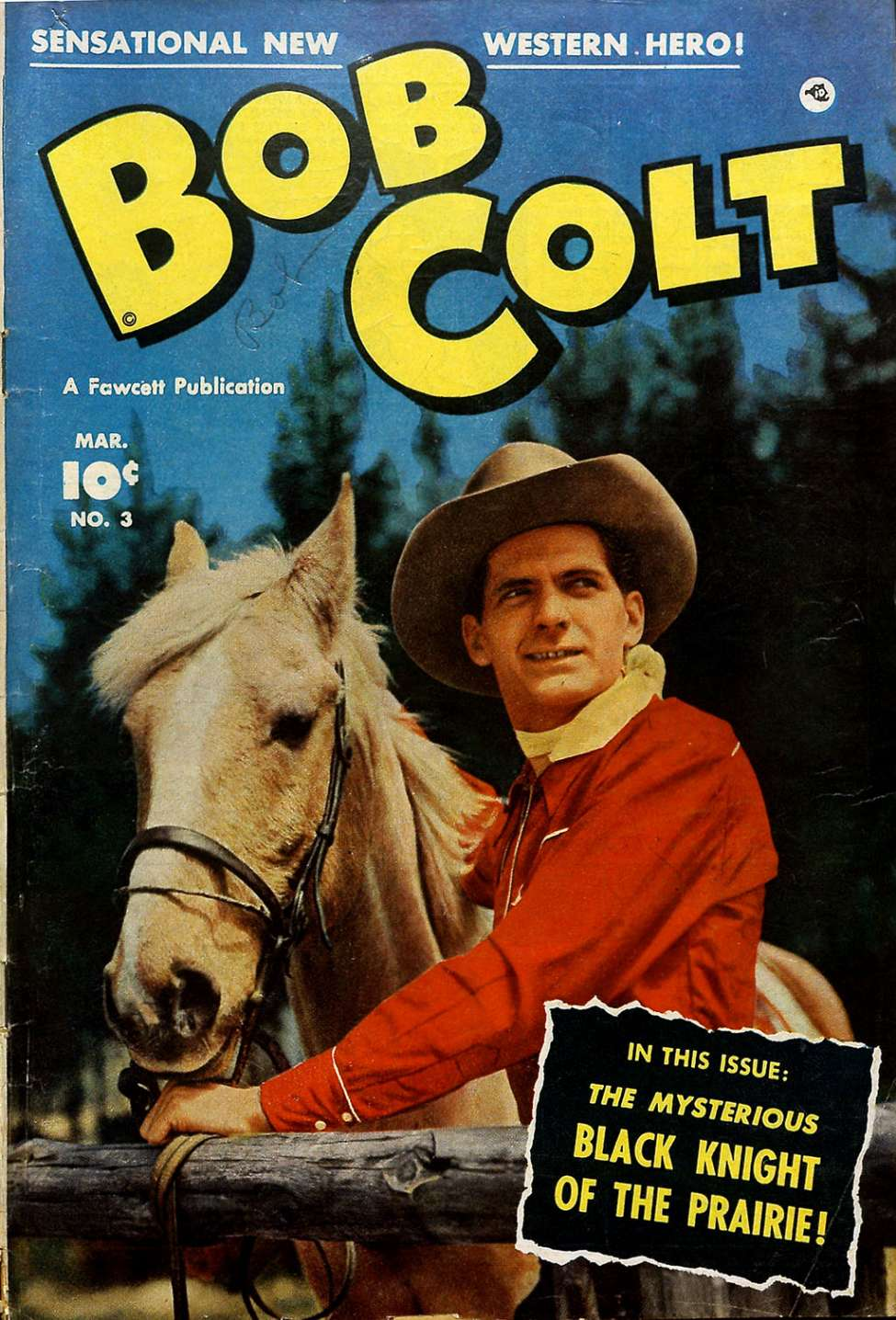
Steve Holland posing as a fake movie cowboy in Bob Colt #3 (March 1951)

Publishers sometimes used models to portray “faux cowboy” heroes. Actor and model Steve Holland posed as Bob Colt, a fictional Fawcett cowboy who appeared in ten issues (1950–1952). Timely Comics used the same trick with Tex Morgan, Tex Taylor and Rex Hart. In a notable instance, Timely editor Stan Lee himself dressed up as the title character for the cover of Black Rider #8 (March 1950).

=== Creators ===
Since Westerns were such a popular genre in the 1950s, many of the period's notable creators spent at least some time doing Western comics.

Writer Paul S. Newman and artist Tom Gill had an 11-year stretch on Dell's The Lone Ranger, a 107-issue run that marks one of the longest of any writer/artist team on a comic-book series. Larry Lieber spent nine years as writer-artist of Marvel's Rawhide Kid. France Herron and Fred Ray were the long-time writer and artist of DC's Tomahawk. Gaylord DuBois excelled in writing Western comics featuring realistic animals: he wrote the entire run of The Lone Ranger's Famous Horse Hi-Yo Silver, the entire run of National Velvet under both the Dell and Gold Key imprints, and many other animal stories for a number of publishers.

Artist Fred Guardineer had a long run on Magazine Enterprises' The Durango Kid. Pete Tumlinson illustrated most of Kid Colt's early stories. Later, Tumlinson drew Western stories for Atlas Comics' Outlaw Fighters, Two-Gun Western, and Wild Western. Russ Heath drew a corral-full of Western stories for such Marvel titles as Wild Western, All Western Winners, Arizona Kid, Black Rider, Western Outlaws, and Reno Browne, Hollywood's Greatest Cowgirl. Vic Carrabotta worked on such Marvel Westerns as Apache Kid, Kid Colt: Outlaw, The Outlaw Kid, and Western Outlaws. Artist John Severin was known for his 1950s Western comics art for Atlas. Artist Mike Sekowsky drew such characters as the Apache Kid, the Black Rider, and Kid Colt for Atlas; he later freelanced for other companies, drawing the TV-series spin-offs Gunsmoke and Buffalo Bill, Jr. for Dell Comics.

Artist Rocke Mastroserio specialized in Western stories for such Charlton Comics series as Billy the Kid, Black Fury, Jim Bowie, Rocky Lane's Black Jack, Sheriff of Tombstone, Six-Gun Heroes, Texas Rangers in Action, and Wyatt Earp, Frontier Marshal. Pat Boyette worked on such Charlton Western series as Billy the Kid, Cheyenne Kid, and Outlaws of the West.

== 1960s decline ==
The Western genre in general peaked around 1960, largely due to the tremendous number of Westerns on American television. Increasingly, the genre reflected a Romantic view of the American West—and American history in general. As the country grappled with the cultural issues of the 1960s and the Vietnam War, the genre seemed increasingly out of touch.

As the American public's interest in the genre waned, Western literature—including comics—began to lose its appeal as well. At the same time, the comics industry was shifting back to superheroes (entering its "Silver Age") and away from some of the other genres which had flourished during the 1950s. In fact, of the original Western comics series begun in the late 1940s and early 1950s, only a handful of titles survived the 1950s. Charlton's low production costs enabled it to continue producing a number of Western titles, but otherwise Dell's The Lone Ranger, and Marvel's Gunsmoke Western, Kid Colt Outlaw, The Two-Gun Kid and Rawhide Kid were the only Western titles to make it through the 1960s.

Gary Friedrich, Mike Esposito, and Ogden Whitney are three of the few notable Western comics creators from the 1960s.

== Weird West and continuing appeal ==
The late 1960s and early 1970s saw the rise of revisionist Western film. Elements include a darker, more cynical tone, with focus on the lawlessness of the time period, favoring realism over romanticism, and an interest in greater historical authenticity. Anti-heroes were common, as were stronger roles for women and more-sympathetic portrayal of Native Americans and Mexicans. The films were often critical of big business, the American government, and masculine figures (including the military and their policies).

Reflecting the trend, in 1968 DC debuted the new character Bat Lash, who starred in a short-lived series. They also revived the All-Star Western title, starting volume two of the series in 1970. In 1972, All-Star Western changed its name to Weird Western Tales, with many stories featuring the newly created Western antihero Jonah Hex (debuting in 1975 in his own title). Weird Western Tales (sister title of Weird War Tales) defined a new multi-genre form: "Weird West," a combination of the Western with another literary genre, usually horror, occult, or fantasy. Other Western characters DC created during this period include the heroes Scalphunter and El Diablo, and the villains El Papagayo, Terra-Man, and Quentin Turnbull.

Marvel also attempted to capitalize on the renewed interest in the Western with two mostly reprint titles, The Mighty Marvel Western (1968–1976) and Western Gunfighters vol. 2 (1970–1975).

The short-lived publisher Skywald Publications attempted a line of Western titles in the early 1970s, but nothing came of it.

Weird Western Tales survived until 1980, and Jonah Hex until 1985. By then no major publishers were producing Western titles, though iconic characters from the DC and Marvel canons would occasionally make cameo appearances in other books.

The DC Comics imprint Vertigo reintroduced the Western genre in 1995 with Preacher, set in a contemporary version of the West. In the 1990s and 2000s, the Western comic leaned toward the Weird West subgenre, usually involving supernatural monsters. However, more traditional Western comics are found throughout this period, from Jonah Hex to Loveless. Series like Desperadoes, High Moon, and Scalped demonstrate the genre's continuing appeal. Creators like Joe R. Lansdale, Michael Fleisher, and Tony DeZuniga were notable contributors to Western comics from this period.

In addition, publishers like America's Comics Group and AC Comics have reprinted a number of Western comics from the genre's "Golden Age."

The Goodbye Family, about a family of Weird West undertakers, started in 2015 and continues in both online and print formats.

== Outside of the United States ==
The Western genre's overall popularity in Europe spawned a Western comics trend, particularly in Italy, France, Belgium, and England. Many European countries published reprints of American-made Western comics (translated into the respective country's native language). The Italian publishers Sergio Bonelli Editore and Editorial Novaro led the field—Editorial Novaro's Gene Autry title ran 424 issues from 1954 to 1984. The Norwegian publisher Se-Bladene and the British publisher L. Miller & Son were also particularly known for their Western comics reprint titles. Se-Bladene's Texas ran 606 issues between 1954 and 1975. The Australian publishers Ayers & James, Cleland, Federal Publishing, Gredown, and Horwitz Publications all published reprints of American Western comics during the 1950s and 1960s.

=== Italy ===
The most popular and long-running Italian-produced Western comic is Gian Luigi Bonelli and Aurelio Galleppini's Tex (starring Tex Willer), first published in 1948. Tex is among the most popular characters in Italian comics, and has been translated into numerous languages, including Portuguese, Finnish, Norwegian, Tamil, Turkish, Slovenian, Croatian, Serbian and Hebrew.

Captain Miki, by the trio EsseGesse, was published in Italy (and translated into many other languages) throughout the 1950s. Characters in the comic were inspired by Gabby Hayes and the popular 1939 Western film Stagecoach. EsseGesse also produced the popular series Il Grande Blek. Benito Jacovitti's Cocco Bill is a Western humor comic produced since the mid-1950s.

In 1949, Mondadori launched the comic series Pecos Bill, written by Guido Martina and illustrated by Raffaele Paparella, Antonio Canale, Pier Lorenzo De Vita, Roy D'Ami, Francesco Gamba, Gino D'Antonio, and Dino Battaglia. Published in Albi d’Oro, it ran until 1955. In 1956, Cesare Solini and Pietro Gamba reinterpreted the character in Le nuove avventure di Pecos Bill, published by Alpe. In 1960, Mondadori reprinted the original stories in Gli Albi di Pecos Bill and sold the rights in 1962 to the Fasani publishing house, which continued the saga with new stories written and drawn by artists such as Franco Donatelli, Guglielmo Letteri, and Rinaldo D’Ami, among others, until 1967. In 1978, publisher Bianconi introduced another version of the hero, created by Armando Bonato. Over the years, Pecos Bill has been revisited and reprinted by numerous Italian publishers and artists.

Sergio Bonelli and Gallieno Ferri's Zagor was first published in Italy by Sergio Bonelli Editore in 1961. Carlo Boscarato and Claudio Nizzi's Larry Yuma was a popular character in the Italian magazine Il Giornalino throughout the 1970s. Giancarlo Berardi and Ivo Milazzo's Ken Parker is a popular Western hero appearing in Italian comics since 1977.

In the late 1990s and early 2000s, writer Gianfranco Manfredi's Magico Vento was a popular title from Sergio Bonelli Editore. Since the late 1990s, Enrico Teodorani's Djustine has been featured in erotic "Weird West" stories in Italy and the United States.

=== Franco-Belgian Western comics ===
The Western humor comic Lucky Luke, published since 1946, debuting in Spirou magazine, is one of the most popular and best-selling comics series in continental Europe. Popular in Canada, about half of the series' adventures have been translated into English. Lucky Luke comics have been translated into 23 languages, including many European languages, and some African and Asian languages.

Tintin magazine featured Western-themed comics starting in 1947 with Le Rallic's various series, and later, between 1955 and 1980 the humor-based Chick Bill by Greg and Tibet. The competing magazine Spirou published Jijé's Jerry Spring, in a realistic vein, beginning in 1954. Albums from the Jerry Spring series were published until 1990.

Jean-Michel Charlier and Jean Giraud's Blueberry is a Western series published beginning in 1963 and continuing until 2005. The series were inspired by Jerry Spring, and the artist Giraud had been mentored by Jijé. Charlier and Giraud created the Jim Cutlass series in 1981; subsequent volumes were written by Giraud and drawn by Christian Rossi.

Greg and Hermann Huppen's Comanche was published from 1972 to 1983 (with the series being continued by Rouge for four more stories). The Belgian publisher Le Lombard produced the title Buddy Longway, by Swiss comics creator Derib, from 1972 to 1987, and from 2002 to 2006.

Durango is a western series created by the Belgian Yves Swolfs in 1981. Currently 17 tomes are available.

=== Other countries ===
England's L. Miller & Son's original Western comics titles included Colorado Kid, Davy Crockett, Kid Dynamite Western Comic, Pancho Villa Western Comic, and Rocky Mountain King Western Comic, all published in the 1950s. Jim Edgar and Tony Weare's "Matt Marriott" was a daily strip which ran in the London Evening News from 1955 to 1977.

Spanish cartoonist Manuel Gago Garcia's The Little Fighter was a popular series of Western comics between 1945 and 1956. Yuki the Bold (debuting in 1958) is another popular Spanish series, as were the shorter-lived series Apache and Red Arrow. Other Spanish Western comics include Sheriff King (beginning in 1964), Sunday (1968), and Kelly Hand (1971).

Hugo Pratt and Héctor Germán Oesterheld's Sergeant Kirk was a popular Western comics title in Argentina during the 1950s. Additional Sergeant Kirk stories were published into the early 1970s.

In Nigeria, the comic series Powerman was published in 1975 by Bardon Press Features of London as an educational tool. While the main character was Powerman, the comic also included a Western feature titled The Black Star Featuring Jango, the Fighting Black Sheriff, set in the fictional Gulch City, Texas, with the black sheriff Jango as its protagonist.

Western comics were popular in Japan in the early 1950s, both translations of American titles like Straight Arrow, the Durango Kid, and Tim Holt; and original Japanese manga. The story goes that during the American occupation of Japan directly after World War, General Eisenhower forbade Japanese publishers to publish samurai comics, and that the next best thing were Western stories of adventure.

Hyung Min-woo's manhwa series Priest was published in Korea and the U.S. from 1998 to 2007.

== Notable American Western comics ==
=== Golden Age of Comic Books ===
Title	Publisher	Issues published	Publication dates	Notes
All-Star Western	DC	62	1951–1961	vol. 1 (vol. 2, published from 1970 to 1972, became Weird Western Tales)
Billy the Kid	Charlton	145	1957–1983	Mostly a reprint title from issue #125 (Jan. 1979) onward
Black Fury	Charlton	57	1955–1966	
Gunfighter	EC	9	1948–1950	Continued as The Haunt of Fear
Cheyenne Kid	Charlton	92	1957–1973	
The Cisco Kid	Dell	41	1951–1958	
Crack Western	Quality	22	1949–1953	took over the numbering of Quality's Crack Comics
Gene Autry Comics	Dell	121	1946–1959	title changed to Gene Autry and Champion with issue #102
Gunsmoke Western	Marvel	46	1948–1963	began as All Winners Comics, vol. 2, before being retitled and reformatted as the Western anthology All-Western Winners (#2–4), Western Winners (#5–7), Black Rider (#8–27), Western Tales of Black Rider (#28–31), and, finally, Gunsmoke Western (#32–77), the last primarily starring Kid Colt, Outlaw
Hopalong Cassidy	Fawcett/DC	134	1946–1959	DC takes over titles in 1953 after Fawcett's demise
Kid Colt Outlaw	Marvel	225	1949–1979	Mostly a reprint title from issue #130 (Sept. 1966) onward
The Lone Ranger	Dell	145	1948–1962	Gold Key picked up the character, sporadically publishing 28 issues from 1964 to 1977, making heavy use of reprint material from the Dell comics, adding in new material toward the end of the run.
The Lone Ranger's Famous Horse Hi-Yo Silver	Dell	34	1952–1960	
Outlaws of the West	Charlton	71	1957–1980	numbering continues in 7-issue reprint series published in 1979–1980
Prize Comics Western	Prize	51	1948–1956	
Rawhide Kid	Marvel	151	1955–1957; 1960–1979	Mostly a reprint title from issue #116 (Oct. 1973) onward
Red Ryder	Dell	151	1941–1956	Initially reprints of the long-running syndicated newspaper strip. With issue #47 (June 1947), began producing original material.
Straight Arrow	Magazine Enterprises	55	1950–1956	Adapted from a popular radio program
Texas Rangers in Action	Charlton	75	1956–1970	
Tomahawk	DC	140	1950–1972	
Two-Gun Kid	Marvel	126	1948–1962	Mostly a reprint title from issue #93 (July 1970) onward
Western Comics	DC	85	1948–1961	
Wild Western	Marvel	55	1948–1957	Published by the Marvel forerunner Atlas
Wrangler Great Moments in Rodeo	American Comics Group	50	1955–1966	

=== Cowboy actor comics ===
- Charles Starrett as the Durango Kid, 41 issues (Magazine Enterprises, 1949–1955)
- Dale Evans Comics, 24 issues (DC, 1948–1952)
- Gabby Hayes Western, 50 issues (Fawcett/Charlton, 1948–1957)
- Gene Autry, 121 issues (Dell, 1946–1955)
- Jimmy Wakely, 18 issues (DC, 1949–1952)
- John Wayne Adventure Comics, 31 issues (Toby Press, 1949–1955)
- Lash LaRue Western, 84 issues (Fawcett/Charlton, 1949–1961)
- Monte Hale Western, 60 issues (Fawcett/Charlton, 1948–1956)
- Rex Allen, 30 issues (Dell, 1951–1959)
- Rocky Lane Western, 87 issues (Fawcett/Charlton, 1949–1959) – many issues featured Slim Pickens backup stories
- Roy Rogers Comics, 91 issues (Dell, 1948–1961)
- Six-Gun Heroes, 83 issues (Fawcett/Charlton, 1950–1965) – featured cowboy actors like Allan "Rocky" Lane, Lash LaRue, Monte Hale, Smiley Burnette, and Tex Ritter
- Tex Ritter Western, 46 issues (Fawcett/Charlton, 1950–1959)
- Tim Holt, 41 issues (Magazine Enterprises, 1948–1954)
- Tom Mix Comics (Ralston Purina, 1940-1941)
- Tom Mix Western, 61 issues (Fawcett, 1948–1953)
- Western Hero, 112 issues (Fawcett, 1948–1952) – featured cowboy actors like Tom Mix and Monte Hale; formerly known as Real Western Hero
- Wild Bill Elliott, 14 issues (Dell, 1950–1955)

=== Contemporary titles ===
- Weird Western Tales (DC, 1972–1980) – began in 1970 as volume two of All-Star Western
- Jonah Hex (DC, 1977–1985; DC/Vertigo, 2005–2011)
- Preacher (DC/Vertigo, 1995–2000)
- Desperadoes (Homage/Wildstorm, 1997–2002; IDW, 2005–2007)
- Loveless (DC/Vertigo, 2005–2008)
- Scalped (DC/Vertigo, 2007–2012)
- High Moon (DC/Zuda, 2007–2017)
- The Goodbye Family (2015–present)
