= Panther (comics) =

Panther is a fictional character appearing in American comic books published by Marvel Comics. The character first appeared in Two Gun Kid #77 (September, 1965).

== Fictional character biography ==
The Panther was an outlaw in the Old West who wore a cat-like suit, and was defeated by the Two-Gun Kid.
