= Vic Carrabotta =

American comic artist (1929–2022)

- Born: Victor Salvatore Carrabotta; June 24, 1929 New York, U.S.
- Died: November 22, 2022 (aged 93) South Carolina, U.S.
- Areas: Penciller, Inker
- Notable works: Atlas Comics

Victor Salvatore Carrabotta (June 24, 1929 – November 22, 2022) was an American comic-book artist and advertising art director whose career stretches to the early 1950s. His comic book art includes much work for Marvel Comics' 1950s forerunner, Atlas Comics.

== Biography ==
=== Early life and career ===
Born either in the New York City suburb of Eastchester or in the Eastchester neighborhood of the borough The Bronx on June 24, 1929, Carrabbotta attended Catholic elementary school, followed by Manhattan's High School of Music & Art and the Cartoonists and Illustrators School (later named the School of Visual Arts). Drawing since grade school, Carrabotta as a teen became friendly with fledgling professional comic-book artist Jerry Grandenetti, who lived near Carrabotta's home and taught him inking, the step in the comic-book process where the pencil artist's work is embellished with ink for stylistic and print-reproduction reasons.

After serving in the United States Marine Corps from 1948 to 1951, where he performed with the Marine Band, Carrabotta worked in construction. Attempting to break into comic books, Carrabotta found himself turned away at several publishing houses, including by Stan Lee, editor-in-chief of Atlas Comics, the future Marvel. In a 2006 interview, Carrabotta credits Jack Kirby for his professional entrée, describing how Kirby turned him down for comics-studio work, but then upon finding Carrabotta's pregnant wife in the lobby as he was seeing Carrobotta out, gave the struggling artist a break:

Jack was very nice. I was just a kid back then, only 21. As he walked me out, I said, "By the way, this is my wife, Connie." Connie stands up and Jack does a double-take up and down because she's pregnant…. He said, "Sit here a minute, I need to go back to my office." He writes a note and seals it, and tells me to go back to Stan with the note. … [Upon doing so,] Stan said, "Jack says you're a good artist." I said, "Oh, I don't know. Would you like to see my samples?" He says, "No, that's OK. Jack says you're a good artist. I'll tell you what," and he throws this script across the desk. He says, "I want this back in a week."

That five-page story, "The House on the Hill" in Astonishing #13 (May 1952), led to a stream of regular work as a freelance penciler for Atlas Comics, with Carrabotta initially inking himself and later being inked by Jack Abel.

=== Atlas Comics ===
Drawing primarily for horror comics, Carrabotta did work for early issues of such Atlas anthologies as Adventures into Terror, Journey into Mystery (including issue #1), and Strange Tales prior to the imposition of the industry's self-censorship Comics Code. He went on to do science-fiction/fantasy suspense stories for titles including Journey into Unknown Worlds, Marvel Tales, Mystic, Uncanny Tales, and others. Carrabotta was one of the few Atlas artists to regularly sign his work, aiding in compiling his bibliography.

After five years, Carrabotta and his wife moved from New York City to his wife's hometown, Lone Star, South Carolina. Continuing to draw for Marvel long-distance, he expanded to such war comics as Battle, Battle Action, Battlefront, Battleground, and the aptly named War Comics; such Westerns as Apache Kid, Kid Colt: Outlaw, The Outlaw Kid, and Western Outlaws; the crime anthologies Caught and Police Action; the jungle title Jann of the Jungle; and the men's adventure anthology Rugged Action.

Carrabotta also did a limited amount of work in the 1950s for Youthful Comics (Chilling Tales, Atomic Attack!), Fiction House (Planet Comics), and Lev Gleason Publications (The Amazing Adventures of Buster Crabbe, Black Diamond Western, fillers in Crime Does Not Pay and that company's Daredevil). Carrabotta's last work before leaving comics in the wake of an industry downturn was a story in Gunsmoke Western #49 (Nov. 1958), though Carrobotta did return for a single Marvel comic during the period fans and historians call the Silver Age of comic books: the nine-page story "The Challenge of Cole Younger" in Two-Gun Kid #86 (March 1967), written by Gary Friedrich.

Marvel reprinted several Carrabotta stories in the 1970s, and one additional in the reprint-anthology miniseries Curse of the Weird #3 (Feb. 1994).

=== Later life and career ===
Upon leaving comics after a 1950s Atlas downturn, Carrabotta moved from South Carolina to Atlanta, Georgia, where he went to work for a printer, illustrating booklets. Segueing into advertising, he opened his own studio in Columbia, South Carolina, then returned to New York City, where he became senior art director at the Alden Advertising Agency. After being in and out of work, he briefly joined Mother Earth News Magazine in Henderson, North Carolina, before again returning to New York to be an art director at Reader’s Digest. From there he became an art director at the Atlanta office of the Manhattan advertising agency BBDO, specializing in storyboards. After winning an award for a Delta Air Lines project, he began freelancing as a storyboard and conceptual artist for several agencies, including Grey Advertising, McCann-Erickson, and Young & Rubicam, for accounts including Advil, AT&T, Coca-Cola, Jell-O, and Kenner Toys.

== Personal life and death ==
Carrabotta was married twice. He has six children. During the latter part of his advertising career, he and his family lived in Westport, Connecticut, but after remarrying, he and his new wife left the New York metropolitan area following the 9/11 terror attack of the World Trade Center and moved to Columbia, South Carolina. At some point afterward he spent three years in Los Angeles, California, where he worked on the Pirates of the Caribbean movie posters. As of at least 2010, he lived in South Carolina.

Carrabotta died in South Carolina on November 22, 2022, at the age of 93.
