= The World's Greatest Superheroes =

American comic strip (1978–1985)

- Author(s): Martin Pasko (1978–1979); Paul Levitz (1979–1981), Gerry Conway (1981), Mike W. Barr (1981–1982), Paul Kupperberg (1982–1985), Bob Rozakis (The Superman Sunday Special)
- Illustrator(s): George Tuska and Vince Colletta (1979–1982), José Delbo and Sal Trapani (1982–1985)
- Current status/schedule: Daily and Sunday; concluded
- Launch date: April 3, 1978
- End date: February 10, 1985
- Alternate name(s): The World's Greatest Superheroes Present Superman (1979–1982); Superman (1982–1983); The Superman Sunday Special (1983–1985, Sundays only)
- Syndicate(s): Chicago Tribune/New York News Syndicate
- Genre(s): Superhero

The World's Greatest Superheroes was a syndicated newspaper comic strip featuring DC Comics characters which ran Sunday and daily from April 3, 1978, to February 10, 1985. It was syndicated by the Chicago Tribune/New York News Syndicate.

== History ==
Initially starring Superman, Batman, Robin, Wonder Woman, the Flash and Black Lightning, the strip underwent several title changes, as the focus changed to primarily feature Superman.

Title	Dates
The World's Greatest Superheroes	April 3, 1978 to October 13, 1979
The World's Greatest Superheroes Present Superman	October 14, 1979 to August 14, 1982
Superman	August 15, 1982 to January 8, 1983, then dailies only from January 10, 1983, to February 9, 1985
The Superman Sunday Special	Sundays only from January 9, 1983, to February 10, 1985

Writers: Martin Pasko scripted at the beginning. Paul Levitz took over October 15, 1979 until March 22, 1981, with his initial story coming from a Pasko idea. Gerry Conway then picked up the assignment. A continuity from Mike W. Barr followed, appearing October 26, 1981 through January 10, 1982. Paul Kupperberg handled continuities from January 11, 1982, until the end, including a segment from January 12 through March 12, 1981, that he ghosted for Levitz. Bob Rozakis wrote all but two of The Superman Sunday Specials.

Artists: Initially dailies and Sundays were penciled by George Tuska and inked by Vince Colletta. At various times from April 25 until November 13, 1982, the strip was worked on by Tuska, Colletta, José Delbo, Bob Smith, Frank McLaughlin and Sal Trapani. Delbo and Trapani then illustrated the feature from November 14, 1982, until the end.

Episode	Start date	End date	Fan title	Hero cast
01	1978-04-03	1978-07-01	Vandal Savage Strikes!	Superman, the Flash, Aquaman and Wonder Woman
02	1978-07-02	1978-10-24	Flash Fights for His Life	Superman, the Flash, Batman, Robin, Wonder Woman, Green Lantern and the Black Canary
03	1978-10-25	1979-01-21	The Disco Disappearances	Superman, Black Lightning, Batman, Robin and the Black Canary
04	1979-01-22	1979-05-20	The Gravity Magnifier	Superman, Wonder Woman and Batman
05	1979-05-21	1979-10-11	Superman Subpoenaed!	Superman
06	1979-10-12	1979-12-12	Jimmy Olsen, Elastic Lad	Superman
07	1979-12-13	1980-03-13	The Shrunken Superman	Superman
08	1980-03-14	1980-06-11	The Gimmick Gang	Superman and Wonder Woman
09	1980-06-12	1980-08-31	The Weaponer	Superman and the Flash
10	1980-09-01	1980-12-13	Nuclear Crisis	Superman and Batman
11	1980-12-14	1981-06-27	Gigi and the Motion Picture	Superman
12	1981-06-28	1981-10-25	Sports with Steve Lombard	Superman
13	1981-10-26	1982-01-10	The Joke is on Superman	Superman and Batman
14	1982-01-11	1982-04-21	Lady Steel	Superman and Wonder Woman
15	1982-04-22	1982-07-28	The Joker Again	Superman
16	1982-07-29	1982-11-13	The Stalker	Superman
17	1982-11-14	1983-03-23	Luthor and the Aliens	Superman
18	1983-03-24	1983-07-17	Mxyzptlk	Superman
19	1983-07-18	1983-10-29	Bal-Ga from New Krypton	Superman
20	1983-10-31	1984-01-14	Luthor and the Robots	Superman
21	1984-01-16	1984-04-14	The Wacky Bizarros	Superman
22	1984-04-16	1984-07-14	Brainiac and the Derlyns	Superman
23	1984-07-16	1984-10-21	The Toymaker	Superman
24	1984-10-22	1985-02-10	Superman's Parents Return	Superman
