= Desperadoes (comics) =

Comic book series

- Cover of Desperadoes: A Moment's Sunlight TPB, art by John Cassaday.

Publication information
- Publisher: Homage Comics/Wildstorm (1997–2002); IDW Publishing (2005–2007)
- Schedule: Monthly
- Genre: Western, Fantasy Western, Weird West
- Publication date: 1997–2007
- Main characters: Gideon Brood; Abby DeGrazia; Race Kennedy; Jerome Alexander Betts; Clay Parkhurst

Creative team
- Created by: Jeff Mariotte; John Cassaday
- Written by: Jeff Mariotte
- Artists: John Cassaday; John Lucas; John Severin; Jeremy Haun; Alberto Dose

Desperadoes is a Weird West comic book series written by Jeff Mariotte, first published by Homage Comics and then by IDW Publishing.

== Characters ==
- Gideon Brood
- Abby DeGrazia
- Race Kennedy
- Jerome Alexander Betts
- Clay Parkhurst

== Publication ==
Each story arc is a limited series which has been collected in a number of volumes:

- Desperadoes: A Moment's Sunlight (with John Cassaday, Homage Comics/Wildstorm, 5-issue mini-series, 1997-1998, tpb, 104 pages, July 1998, ISBN 1-58240-013-X)
- Desperadoes: Epidemic! (with art laid out by John Cassaday and drawn by John Lucas, Homage Comics/Wildstorm, one-shot, 1999, ISBN B0006RRCHQ)
- Desperadoes: Quiet of the Grave (with John Severin, Homage Comics/DC Comics, 5-issue mini-series, tpb, 128 pages, December 2002, ISBN 1-4012-0018-4)
- Desperadoes: Banners of Gold (with Jeremy Haun, 5-issue mini-series, IDW Publishing, tpb, 120 pages, August 2005, hardcover ISBN 1-933239-58-1, softback ISBN 1-932382-96-8)
- Desperadoes: Buffalo Dreams (with Alberto Dose, 4-issue mini-series, IDW Publishing, January 2007, tpb, September 2007, ISBN 1-60010-114-3)
