= Kid Colt, Outlaw =

Comic book series

- Kid Colt, Outlaw #200. Cover art by Gil Kane.

Publication information
- Publisher: Atlas Comics; Marvel Comics
- Schedule: Monthly
- Format: Ongoing series
- Genre: Western
- Publication date: (Kid Colt); August 1948 – February 1949 (Kid Colt Outlaw); May 1949 – April 1979
- No. of issues: Kid Colt: 4 Kid Colt Outlaw: 225
- Main character: Kid Colt

Creative team
- Written by: Stan Lee
- Artist(s): Pete Tumlinson, Jack Keller, Vic Carrabotta, Mike Sekowsky

Kid Colt, Outlaw is a comic book title featuring the character Kid Colt originally published by Atlas Comics beginning in 1948 and later Marvel Comics.

== Publication history ==
Kid Colt and his horse Steel first appeared in Kid Colt #1 (August 1948), from Marvel predecessor Timely Comics. Originally his cover logo was subtitled "Hero of the West" but by issue three this was changed to "Outlaw". His origin was told in Kid Colt #11 (Sept. 1950), and is similar to that of the Rawhide Kid, another Western character from Marvel's 1950s iteration, Atlas Comics.

Pete Tumlinson was the primary artist on Kid Colt, Outlaw from issues #14-24 (May 1951 - Jan. 1953) for some of Kid Colt's earliest adventures; Tumlinson had previously drawn an anthological Western story, "The Magic of Manitou", for Kid Colt, Outlaw #13 (March 1951). Artist Jack Keller began his long association with Kid Colt in Kid Colt, Outlaw #25 (March 1953), and stayed with the character for at least a dozen years in that signature title. Comics writer and historian Tony Isabella wrote that Keller "drew more Kid Colt stories than any other artist and may hold the record for drawing the most stories of any Marvel character." Marvel editor Stan Lee would later take over writing chores on the title. Cover artists included such notables as Joe Maneely, John Severin, and Russ Heath, until the frequent Marvel cover team of penciller Jack Kirby and inker Dick Ayers took over for the bulk of them from 1959-1965. A brief publishing hiatus occurred between issues #139 (April 1968) and #140 (Oct. 1969). The series ended with #229 (April 1979), making it the longest-running Western comic book.

Kid Colt additionally headlined the three-issue Giant-Size Kid Colt (January 1975 - July 1975), which consisted entirely of reprints except for one new story in each of the latter two issues.

Aside from assisting with backgrounds for artist Tom Gill, the artist Herb Trimpe made his professional comics debut with two Kid Colt Western stories, in Kid Colt, Outlaw #134–135 (May and July 1967).

== Awards ==
Kid Colt, Outlaw won the Alley Award for Best Western Title in 1966.
