= Black Rider (character) =

Fictional Western character

The Black Rider

Publication information
- Publisher: Marvel Comics
- First appearance: All-Western Winners #2 (Winter 1948)
- Created by: Syd Shores (art)

In-story information
- Alter ego: Matthew "Doc" Masters
- Notable aliases: The Cactus Kid, Black Mask, Heron Robledo
- Abilities: Skilled horseman and marksman
The Black Rider
Publication information
- Publisher: Timely Comics
- Schedule: Bimonthly
- Format: Ongoing series
- Genre: Western
- Publication date: Mar. 1950 – Nov. 1955
- No. of issues: 24
- Main character: The Black Rider
Creative team
- Artist: Syd Shores

The Black Rider is a fictional Western character appearing in American comic books published by Marvel Comics. He first appeared in All-Western Winners #2 (Winter 1948), from the company's 1940s forerunner, Timely Comics.

== Publication history ==
After appearing in subsequent issues of the All-Western Winners omnibus, by issue #8 the book changed its title to Black Rider, with the character becoming the lead feature. Other company characters, like Kid Colt and Arrowhead also made appearances. After slightly changing its name again, to Western Tales of Black Rider, by issue #32 the book reverted to an anthology format and was renamed Gunsmoke Western (which took over the numbering of the Black Rider title) through the 1950s.

By 1957, the title was cancelled, but a new series called Black Rider Rides again was published, drawn by Jack Kirby. It lasted by only 1 issue, because of the Atlas implosion. The stories intended for the second issue were published in the next years in various western series. one story was only published abroad, in Australias in the comic The Fast Gun #9.

Most of the Black Rider's adventures were drawn by Syd Shores. When the character's adventures were reprinted in the 1970s in Western Gunfighters, the character was renamed the Black Mask.

A one-shot revival, Strange Westerns Starring the Black Rider appeared in 2006, with a story by Steve Englehart and art by Marshall Rogers. This story included a cameo appearance by a younger version of the Dr. Strange character the Ancient One.

== Fictional character biography ==
As a young man, Matthew Masters was known as the Cactus Kid, an outlaw. His criminal career ended one day at the Last Chance Saloon in Jefferson County, Texas, when he faced the David Gang, who had taken the town hostage. When the dust cleared, the killers were dead, and the Cactus Kid was summoned to the mansion of the governor of Texas. The governor pardoned the young outlaw as a reward for getting rid of the Davis Gang, and the Cactus Kid promised to go to medical school and become a doctor.

Years later, "Doc" Masters became the new physician for the small town of Leadville, Texas. Masters' new peaceful lifestyle left him unwilling to use violence when a hired killer came to town, and he was branded a coward by the townspeople. Masters decided to disguise himself as the Black Rider, so that he could fight criminals without revealing his criminal past to the town.He began to romance the beautiful but venomous blonde rancher Marie Lathrop (who despised Doc Masters, but loved the Black Rider), and helped her father Jim Lathrop Later, the Black Rider identity was discovered by the young Bobby Lathrop, who became his ally and confident. The Black Rider's adventures happened from before 1870 until 1877. He began cleaning Leadville of outlaws, and then he expanded his actions all across the West, acting as medic of the frontier, becoming very famous acrros the land.

In one his travels, Masters pretended to be an engineer called Oswald Garry and romanced a spunky rancher named Barbara Kane, impressing her, mastering her with a lash and promising her marriage.

Sometime, in middle of one of his adventures, the Black Rider investigated a crime in Texas that leads him to New York City's Chinatown. There he receives help from a mysterious Chinese man, who is eventually revealed to be a younger version of the Ancient One, future mentor of the occult superhero Doctor Strange.

Much later in his hero career, in 1880, Masters found a dying Masked Rider, Jim Gardley, who was shot by unknown assailants. When Masters tried to assist him and retired the mask from his face, Gardley suddenly died. Masters took the Eternity Mask and decides to search for the killers. Later in life, at his 80s, Masters gives the mask to the young hero Dennis Piper, The Ferret.

== Brazilian continuation ==
The Black Rider (translated as "Cavaleiro Negro") became a very popular hero in Brazil, where he was published by publisher Rio Gráfica since 1949, being published first in the magazine Gibi Mensal. Then the Black Rider starred his own long series of 245 series, 15 annuals and 2 special series, beginning with an issue #1 in September 1952. The civilian name of the Black rider was translated as "Heron Robledo" from Matthew Masters and his horse was called "Molenga" instead of "Ichabod".

When the American material from Marvel ended, Rio Grafica began to created original stories produced by Brazilian authors (since issue #79). Later in the line, (issue #198) they began to adapt stories from the Western hero "Gringo" (From Spain group "Selecciones Ilustradas"). In those later stories, the blonde cowboy Gringo was replaced by the brunette Black Rider, but the art and many of dialogue was left the same, with additional changes in names and story.

Previously, a few American stories of Durango Kid were also adapted to be of Black Rider, because of the physical similarity of both heroes.

The Brazilian stories were more numerous thant the American ones and were set in the same continuity, continuing where they stopped. The stories continued to be a one-shot adventures, but longer and more complex, with a more serious tone in the last ones, exploring the later life of the Black Rider, who (like Gringo) began to wander the West again and defended the outcasts of western society like Indians, Mexicans, and Chinese.

== Other versions ==
A previous version of the Black rider appeared in Two Gun Kid #5. She was Kim Lewis, a beautiful rancher who pretended to be an outlaw using a cape, mask and costume identical to the later Matthew Masters. She confronted Clay Harder, the first Two-Gun kid, but she was discovered, unmasked and spanked very hard by the Kid. Later Kim would meet the main Black Rider, confronted him as a copycat, but she was captured and spanked again.

A modern-day version of the character stars in the five-issue ensemble miniseries Six Guns (#1-4 cover-dated January–March 2012), by writer Andy Diggle and artist Davide Gianfelice, and also starring the extant female mercenary Tarantula and new contemporary versions of the Marvel Old West heroes Tex Dawson a.k.a. the Western Kid; Matt Slade; and the Two-Gun Kid.
