= Jack Keller (artist) =

American comic book artist

- Jack Keller c.1964
- Born: Jack R. Keller; June 16, 1922 Reading, Pennsylvania
- Died: January 2, 2003 (aged 80) Reading, Pennsylvania
- Areas: Penciller, Inker
- Notable works: Kid Colt

Jack R. Keller (June 16, 1922 – January 2, 2003) was an American comic book artist best known for his 1950s and 1960s work on the Marvel Comics Western character Kid Colt, and for his later hot rod and racecar series at Charlton Comics.

== Biography ==
=== Early life and career ===
The self-taught Keller broke into comics in 1941, a year after graduating from West Reading High School, creating a single-appearance feature called "The Whistler" (no relation to the radio-show character) in Dell Comics' War Stories #5 (1942; no cover date). This led to work the following year with Quality Comics, where he worked in lesser or greater capacities on such comic-book series as Blackhawk and such features as "Man Hunter" and "Spin Shaw". As well, Keller drew backgrounds for Will Eisner's eight-page newspaper Sunday-supplement comic The Spirit, working with serviceman Eisner's World War II fill-in artist, Lou Fine. Keller additionally drew for the publisher Fiction House, including the feature "Suicide Smith" in the aviation-themed Wings Comics.

Original artwork for a Jack Keller splash page: Kid Colt, Outlaw #92 (Sept. 1960)

In 1950, Keller became a staff artist at Atlas, publisher Martin Goodman's 1950s predecessor to Marvel Comics. The dependable, unflashy Keller drew Western, horror and, working with writer Carl Wessler, crime stories.

=== Kid Colt and hot rods ===
Keller began his long association with Kid Colt in Kid Colt, Outlaw #25 (March 1953). He stayed with the character for at least a dozen years in that signature title, as well as in such anthology series as All Western Winners, Two-Gun Western and Gunsmoke Western. In 1955, Keller also began freelancing for the low-budget Charlton Comics, based in Derby, Connecticut, drawing Western and war stories for titles including Billy the Kid, Cheyenne Kid, Battlefield Action, Fightin' Air Force, Fightin' Army, Fightin' Marines and Submarine Attack.

Following the near-demise of Atlas' comic-book line in 1957, and the accompanying cutbacks and firings, Keller supplemented his income by working in a car dealership in his home town. Within two years, he would be back freelancing for Atlas / Marvel. By this time, Keller was also indulging his love of race cars and model cars by writing and drawing such Charlton comics as Grand Prix, Hot Rod Racers, Hot Rods and Racing Cars, Teenage Hotrodders, Drag 'n' Wheels, Surf 'n' Wheels and World of Wheels. He stopped drawing for Marvel Comics by 1967, when Kid Colt, Outlaw had become mostly reprints, then drew a small number of stories for DC Comics from 1968 to 1971, including for the licensed toy-car comic Hot Wheels. He also continued to draw for Charlton, where his last known comics work was the cover and the accompanying eight-page story "The Rescuers" in the combat title Attack #14 (Nov. 1973).

Comics writer and historian Tony Isabella wrote that Keller

...drew more Kid Colt stories than any other artist and may hold the record for drawing the most stories of any Marvel character. Keller also drew (and sometimes wrote) hot-rod comics for Charlton. ... Keller was never the most exciting of comics artists, but he was a first-rate storyteller whose people moved naturally and whose backgrounds centered them in reality. He never distracted readers from the story; he pulled them into it.

=== Later career and death ===
Keller returned to selling cars at Marshall Chevrolet in Reading, Pennsylvania and later was a part-time salesperson for Fun Stuff Hobbies and for Kiddie Kar Kollectibles.

Keller died at St. Joe's Hospital in Reading, age 80, on January 2, 2003. He was buried at Forest Hills cemetery in Reiffton, Pennsylvania, and was survived by sons Richard and Robert, and by a sister, Vivian Riegel.

== Critical assessment ==
Cartoonist and columnist Fred Hembeck wrote that,

Jack's art had a pleasing crispness to it, and sorta reminded me of a stripped-down John Severin. It was a tiny talent pool at the [publisher] [Martin] Goodman ranch [i.e. Marvel Comics] back in 1961 — [Jack] Kirby, [Steve] Ditko, [Don] Heck, [Dick] Ayers, and maybe [Paul] Reinman seemed to produce all the art, along with Jack Keller. And yet, while the others may've taken on all sorts of assignments — horror, war, western, superhero — I never saw Jack anywhere but within the pages of the [Kid Colt] comic, certainly not cavorting in the nascent Marvel Universe of gods and godlike characters. But every month, there was Jack Keller, bringing the Wild West to life one more time.
