= Kid Colt =

Fictional character appearing in American comic books published by Marvel Comics

Kid Colt is the name of two fictional characters appearing in American comic books published by Marvel Comics. The first is a cowboy whose adventures have taken place in numerous western-themed comic book series published by Marvel. The second is a cowboy-themed horse-like superhero. The character's first appearance was in Kid Colt #1 (August 1948).

== Publication history ==
Kid Colt starred in the comic book series Kid Colt Outlaw, as well as in several other titles. He is the longest-running cowboy star in American comic-book publishing, featured in stories for a 31-year stretch from 1948 to 1979, though from 1966 most of the published stories were reprints.

Kid Colt appeared in numerous series through that decade, including All Western Winners, Wild Western, Two-Gun Western, and Gunsmoke Western. Each issue of The Mighty Marvel Western featured three Old West heroes: the Rawhide Kid and the Two-Gun Kid in all issues, and Kid Colt in all issues except #25-42 (July 1973 - Oct. 1975), in which Matt Slade, from the 1956 series Matt Slade, Gunfighter, published by Marvel forerunner Atlas Comics, was substituted. Virtually all Kid Colt stories were drawn by the character's longtime artist, Jack Keller. The series ended with #229 (April 1979), making it the longest-running Western comic book.

Kid Colt additionally headlined the three-issue Giant-Size Kid Colt (Jan. 1975-July 1975), which consisted entirely of reprints except for one new story in each of the latter two issues.

The character has appeared sporadically in Marvel universe superhero titles, usually in stories involving time travel between the current era and Western times. These have included The Avengers #141-43 (1975), The Fantastic Four vol. 3 #33-34 (2000) and The Black Panther vol. 3 #46-47 (2002).

It was not until 2000, with the miniseries Blaze of Glory, by writer John Ostrander and artist Leonardo Manco, that a Western series again featured Kid Colt. The gritty miniseries — which featured different-looking versions of Marvel Western characters and retconned that the naively clean-cut Marvel Western stories of years past were merely dime novel fictions of their actual lives — killed off Kid Colt in the series' conclusion (#4, March 2000). An older version of Kid Colt appears in Skaar: King Of The Savage Land, having faked his death and subsequently time-traveling.

Marvel reintroduced Kid Colt as teenager in a 2009 "one-shot" comic ("Kill the Kid") written by Tom Defalco and illustrated by Rick Burchett (originally published in digital format). The book, narrated by a self-proclaimed drifter named Everett Hawkmore who partners with the Kid, retells a somewhat modified origin story.

The character also appears in 2010's Rawhide Kid: The Sensational Seven.

== Fictional character biography ==
=== Kid Colt (Western hero) ===
Kid Colt
- Cover of Kid Colt, Outlaw #200.

Publication information
- Publisher: Marvel Comics
- First appearance: Kid Colt #1 (Aug. 1948)
- Created by: Ernie Hart; Bill Walsh; Chu Hing

In-story information
- Alter ego: Blaine Colt
- Species: Human
- Team affiliations: The Sensational Seven
- Partnerships: Steel (horse)
- Notable aliases: Mr. Jones, various other aliases

Kid Colt (real name: Blaine Colt, but see below) is an American Old West cowboy who was wrongly accused of murder (he killed his father's murderer in a fair gun battle) and became a fugitive from the law, along the way engaging in heroic good acts in an effort to restore his reputation. He fought many villains such as the Robin Hood Raider.

Kid Colt was later killed.

Kid Colt was later reintroduced as a teenager whose real name was changed to Blaine Cole. A brother of Cole was missing after the raid that killed his parents and a search for a witness to the gunfight that had erroneously branded him an outlaw.

An older version of Kid Colt later appears, having faked his death and subsequently time-traveling.

During a period where time itself was becoming unraveled, Kid Colt teamed up with the Hulk, Rawhide Kid and Two-Gun Kid to stop a murderous sheriff with time-traveling powers.

=== Kid Colt (superhero) ===
Kid Colt
- Elric (Kid Colt) in his horse form. Art by Mark Bagley.

Publication information
- Publisher: Marvel Comics
- First appearance: Heroes Reborn: Young Allies #1 (Jan. 2000)
- Created by: Fabian Nicieza; Mark Bagley

In-story information
- Alter ego: Elric Freedom Whitemane
- Species: Human mutate/Kymellian hybrid
- Team affiliations: Young Allies
- Abilities: Shapeshifting; Teleportation; Creation of sub-space pockets

Kid Colt (real name: Elric Freedom Whitemane) is a contemporary superhero character in the Marvel Comics universe who has appeared as a member of the modern-day Young Allies. Created by Fabian Nicieza and Mark Bagley, he debuted in Heroes Reborn: Young Allies #1 (Jan. 2000).

Born to hippies, Elric was a normal child, until government agents paid his parents to let them give him special "tests" (which were attempts to fuse his DNA with the DNA of the equine aliens known as the Kymellians). The tests were successful, transforming Elric into a bipedal horse-like creature. Hearing stories of the wild west, Elric assumed the identity of Kid Colt, and began to use his newfound powers to help those in need. He was eventually recruited by the Young Allies to help them free two alien beings. Elric decided to remain with the team.

Elric is a hybrid of human and Kymellian. Due to his alien DNA, he can shapeshift into a humanoid horse, and teleport short distances. He can store items in sub-space "closets", pockets of extra-dimensional space which can hold items as large as a human being until Elric needs them. By creating multiple pockets which are linked together, Elric can run through them, and seem to rapidly blink in and out of existence. Due to his horse-like digestive system, Elric is a vegetarian.

== In other media ==
- The Blaine Colt incarnation of Kid Colt appears in the Agent Carter episode "Better Angels". Howard Stark is seen creating a film based on the in-universe Kid Colt comic book, which, according to him, is based on a real person.
- The Blaine Colt incarnation of Kid Colt appears in Lego Marvel Super Heroes 2.
