= John Severin =

American cartoonist

- Born: John Powers Severin; December 26, 1921 Jersey City, New Jersey, U.S.
- Died: February 12, 2012 (aged 90) Denver, Colorado, U.S.
- Areas: Penciler, Inker
- Notable works: Frontline Combat; Two-Fisted Tales; Cracked; Sgt. Fury and his Howling Commandos; Two-Gun Kid
- Awards: Alley Award, 1967, 1968; Will Eisner Comics Hall of Fame, 2003; Inkwell Awards SASRA, 2022

John Powers Severin (/ˈsɛvərɪn/; December 26, 1921 – February 12, 2012) was an American comics artist noted for his distinctive work with EC Comics, primarily on the war comics Two-Fisted Tales and Frontline Combat; for Marvel Comics, especially its war and Western comics; and for his 45-year stint with the satiric magazine Cracked. He was one of the founding cartoonists of Mad in 1952.

Severin was inducted into the Will Eisner Award Hall of Fame in 2003.

== Early life ==
John Severin was born in Jersey City, New Jersey, of Norwegian and Irish descent. He was a teenager in Bay Ridge, Brooklyn, New York City, when he began drawing professionally. While attending high school, he contributed cartoons to The Hobo News, receiving payment of one dollar per cartoon. Severin recalled in 1999:

I was sometimes selling 19 or 20 of them a week. Not every week, naturally. But I didn't have to get a regular job to carry me through high school. It was almost every week—not every week—but almost every week. I didn't have to get a job. I hated to work, I'll tell you. I didn't have to get a job then, because I was in high school.

He attended the High School of Music & Art in New York City, together with future EC Comics and Mad artists Harvey Kurtzman, Will Elder, Al Jaffee and Al Feldstein. After graduating from the school in 1940, he worked as an apprentice machinist and then enlisted in the Army, serving in the Pacific during World War II.

== Career ==
=== Early work: 1947–51 ===
In a 1980 interview, Severin recalled his start as a professional artist:

I had decided to exhibit some paintings of mine in a High School of Music and Art exhibition for the alumni. Charlie Stern was in charge of it, so I went to see him at his studio. He was the "Charles" of the Charles William Harvey Studio, the other two being William Elder and Harvey Kurtzman. They asked me if I'd like to rent space with them there. I did, and started working with them. When Charlie left ... I became the third man, but they didn't want to change it to John William Harvey Studio, so they left the name ... Harvey was doing comics, Willie and Charlie were doing advertising stuff, and I just joined in ... [I did] design work, logos for toy boxes, logos for candy boxes, cards to be included in the candy boxes.

Inspired by the quick money Kurtzman would make in between advertising assignments with one-page "Hey Look!" gags for editor Stan Lee at Timely Comics, Severin worked up comics samples inked by Elder. In late 1947, he recalled, the writer-artist-editor team of Joe Simon and Jack Kirby at Crestwood Publications "gave us our first job."

Since it was not standard practice to credit comics creators during this era, a comprehensive list of his early work is difficult to compile. Author and historian Jim Vadeboncoeur Jr., based on Severin's description of "a crime story about a boy and a girl who killed somebody ... I think it was their stepfather. They lived on a farm, or out in the suburbs," believes that first Severin/Elder story was the eight-page "The Clue of the Horoscope" in Headline Comics #32 (cover-dated Nov. 1948), from the Crestwood-affiliated Prize Comics. The standard reference Grand Comics Database has no credits for that story, and lists Severin's first confirmed work in comics as two stories published the same month: the ten-page Boy Commandos adventure "The Triumph of William Tell" in DC Comics' Boy Commandos #30; and the eight-page Western story "Grinning Hole in the Wall" in Prize Comics' Prize Comics Western vol. 7, #5 (each Dec. 1948), both of which he penciled and the latter of which he also inked.

Through 1955, Severin drew a large number of stories for the latter title and other Western series from Prize, and as penciler, he co-created with an unknown writer the long-running Native American feature "American Eagle" in Prize Comics Western vol. 9, #6 (Jan. 1951), inked by his high-school classmate turned fellow pro Will Elder.

Around this time, Severin did his first confirmed work for two publishers with whom he would long be associated, Marvel Comics and EC Comics. For the future Marvel Comics, he penciled the seven-page romance comic story "My Heart Had No Faith" in Timely Comics' Actual Romances #1 (Oct. 1949).

=== EC Comics ===
For EC Comics, he debuted with the seven-page "War Story" in Two-Fisted Tales #19 (Feb. 1951), continuing to work in tandem with his friend Elder as his inker, notably on science fiction and war stories. Severin drew stories for both Two-Fisted Tales and Frontline Combat. When Kurtzman dropped the war comics to devote more time to Mad, Severin became sole artist on Two-Fisted Tales for four issues and scripted some stories. He also illustrated stories written by his friend Colin Dawkins and future Mad art director John Putnam. Severin and Dawkins were the uncredited co-editors of Two-Fisted Tales #36–39.

Severin and Elder eventually split as a team at EC. They both were in the group of the five original artists who launched editor Harvey Kurtzman's landmark satiric comic book Mad, along with Kurtzman, Wally Wood and Jack Davis. Severin appeared in nine of Mad's first ten issues, drawing ten pieces between 1952 and 1954. According to accounts by both Severin and Kurtzman, the two had a falling out over art criticisms Kurtzman made during this period. It was Kurtzman who suggested that Severin ink with a pen as opposed to brush inking. Though Severin eventually took this advice in his later work, he was annoyed at Kurtzman at the time, for this and other remarks, and refused further work with him. Kurtzman insisted on doing the layouts for all the artists, which some resented, including Severin.

His ability to draw people of different nationalities convincingly was highly admired by his peers, as was his eye for authentic details. Upon Severin's death, writer Mark Evanier remembered, "Jack Kirby used to say that when he had to research some historical costume or weapon for a story, it was just as good to use a John Severin drawing as it was to find a photo of the real thing. They don't make 'em like that anymore."

=== Marvel Comics and other publishers ===
Sgt. Fury and his Howling Commandos #57 (Aug. 1968). Cover art by penciler Dick Ayers and inker Severin.

Following the cancellation of EC's comic book line in the wake of the Comics Code in the mid-1950s, Severin began working for Atlas Comics, the 1950s forerunner of Marvel Comics. Sergeant Barney Barker, drawn by Severin, was Atlas' answer to Sgt. Bilko. Artist and colorist Stan Goldberg, a company colleague, recalled in 2005,

I was in the [company's artist room known as the] Bullpen with a lot of well-known artists who worked up there at that time. We had our Bullpen up there until about 1958 or 1959. [sic; the Bullpen staff was let go in 1957] The guys ... who actually worked nine-to-five and put in a regular day, and not the freelance guys who'd come in a drop off their work ... were almost a hall-of-fame group of people. There was John Severin. Bill Everett. Carl Burgos. There was the all-time great Joe Maneely ... We all worked together, all the colorists and correction guys, the letterers and artists ... We had a great time.

After Atlas transitioned to become Marvel Comics in the 1960s, Severin did extensive work as penciler, inker or both on such series as The Incredible Hulk, Conan the Barbarian, and Captain Savage and his Leatherneck Raiders. Herb Trimpe, the primary Hulk penciler during this period comics fans and historians call the Silver Age of comic books, said in 2009, "I was kind of thrilled when John Severin inked me, because I liked his work for EC Comics, and he was one of my idols." As inker, Severin teamed with penciler Dick Ayers on an acclaimed run of the World War II series Sgt. Fury and his Howling Commandos, beginning with #44 (July 1967). In the 1970s, he collaborated with his sister, artist Marie Severin, on Marvel's sword and sorcery series, King Kull.

During this time he was a prolific contributor to the satiric Cracked magazine, drawing television and movie parodies along with other features, including most of the magazine's covers. Severin was Cracked's signature artist for nearly 40 years.

For Warren Publishing in the 1960s, he drew for the black-and-white comics magazines Blazing Combat and Creepy. Severin also contributed to Topps' line of bubble gum trading cards. He was one of the artists on Joe Kubert's self-published Sojourn series in 1977. His 1980s work for Marvel included The 'Nam, What The--?!, Savage Tales (volume 2), and Semper Fi.

Circa 2000, writer Jeff Mariotte recalled in 2002, Severin phoned Scott Dunbier, a group editor at DC Comics' WildStorm imprint, "and said he was looking to do comics again" after working primarily for Cracked at the time. "I happened to pass by Scott's office as he hung up the phone, and he sounded kind of awestruck as he told me that John Severin wanted to do something with us. I said something like, 'Gee, a Desperadoes story by Severin would be great,'" referring to Mariotte's Western miniseries for DC. "Scott agreed. We needed to hurry, before he was snapped up by someone else, so I went home and worked up a proposal overnight. We had sent him, right after that first call, copies of the original Desperadoes books. That was followed up by the proposal, the next day. He liked what he saw and wanted to play along." This led to Severin drawing the sequel miniseries Desperadoes: Quiet of The Grave.

He illustrated the controversial 2003 Marvel limited series The Rawhide Kid, a lighthearted parallel universe Western that reimagined the outlaw hero as a kitschy though still formidably gunslinging gay man. Severin, who had drawn the character for Atlas in the 1950s, refuted rumors that he had not known of the subject matter, saying at the time of the premiere issue's release, "The Rawhide Kid is rather effeminate in this story. It may be quite a blow to some of the old fans of Rawhide Kid. But it's a lot of fun, and he's still a tough hombre." Also in the 2000s, Severin contributed to Marvel's The Punisher; DC Comics' Suicide Squad, American Century, Caper, and Bat Lash; and Dark Horse Comics' Conan, B.P.R.D. and Witchfinder.

== Personal life ==
Severin's family members working in the publishing and entertainment fields include his sister Marie Severin, a comic book artist, who was the colorist for EC's comics; his son John Severin, Jr., the head of Bubblehead Publishing; his daughter, Ruth Larenas (d. 2023), a producer for that company; and his grandson, John Severin III, a music producer and recording engineer.

Severin died at his home in Denver, Colorado, on February 12, 2012, at the age of 90. His wife of 60 years, Michelina, survived him, as did his six children and comics artist sister Marie Severin.

== Bibliography (incomplete) ==
=== Marvel Comics ===
- Incredible Hulk (inker) # 108-110; 131-133; 141-151; 153-155 (1968–1972)
- King Kull (inker) Kull the Conqueror (Vol. 1) #1–10 (1973-1975) KULL AND THE BARBARIANS (1975) #1 (inker)
- Conan the Barbarian

CONAN THE BARBARIAN (1970) #10 (inker) (1971)
CONAN THE BARBARIAN (1970) #25 ( inker to penciller john buscema ) (inker) (1973)
SAVAGE SWORD OF CONAN ANNUAL 1 (1975) #1 (1973)
CONAN (2004) #18 (John Severin / Bruce Timm ) (penciller) published 2005

- Strange Tales Vol 1 #136; 137; 138 (inker) (1965)
- Sgt.Fury and His Howling Commandos (vol.1) # 71; 72; 73-81; 166-170 (1969)
- Sgt.Fury King-Size Special # 4, August 1968. (inker)
- The 'Nam (1987 series) #3; #6
- Semper Fi (1988) #1
- ADVENTURE INTO FEAR (1970) #8 (inker) (1972)
- SUB-MARINER (1968) #38 (1971)
- YELLOW CLAW #1-4 ( Inker to penciller joe maneely; jack kirby) (inker) (1957)

=== DC Comics ===
- Our Fighting Forces (inker) # 124; 131-150; (1970–1974)
- Action Comics Weekly (1988) #630
- Sgt. Rock Special (1988 series) #10 (inker)
- Sgt. Rock (1991 series) #21 (inker)
- Caper (2003) Hollywood Caper #5-8 (inker) published 2004
- Suicide Squad Vol 2 #10 (artist) August, 2002
- American Century Vol 1 #24 (artist) 2003
- Bat Lash Vol.2 (2008) #1-6 (inker)

=== EC Comics ===
- Two Fisted Tales (artist) # 20; 36; 37-39; 40-41 (1951–1956)
- Weird Fantasy (artist) # 19-22 (1951–53)

=== Wildstorm Comics ===
- Desperadoes: Quiet of the Grave #1-5 (2002)

=== Dark Horse Comics ===
- B.P.R.D.: Plague of Frogs (2014 series) #2 (inker)

=== Warren Publications ===
- Creepy

Creepy (1964) issues #6-10 (1979)
Creepy #10; 19, 76, 80, 121 (artist) (1966-1880)

- Creepy #6 (1965)
- Creepy #7 (1966)
- Creepy #10 (1966)
- Creepy #11 (1966)
- Creepy #14 (1967)
- Creepy #17 (1967)
- Creepy #19 (1968)
- Creepy #48 (1972)
- Creepy #55 (1973)
- Creepy #62 (1974)
- Creepy #68 (1975)
- Creepy #73 (1975)
- Creepy #75 (1975)
- Creepy #76 (1976)
- Creepy #77 (1976)
- Creepy #78 (1976)
- Creepy #79 (1976)
- Creepy #80 (1976)
- Creepy #81 (1976)
- Creepy #83 (1976)
- Creepy #84 (1976)
- Creepy #86 (1977)
- Creepy #87 (1977)
- Creepy #89 (1977)
- Creepy #91 (1977)
- Creepy #92 (1977)
- Creepy #93 (1977)
- Creepy #95 (1978)
- Creepy #100 (1978)
- Creepy #105 (1979)
- Creepy #112 (1979)
- Creepy #121 (1980) all-Severin-special issue

- Eerie

Eerie #43-49 (1972-1973): Severin was a regular staff artist during this period.

- Eerie #1 (1965)
- Eerie #2 (1966)
- Eerie #8 (March 1967)
- Eerie #20 (March 1969)
- Eerie #42 (1972)
- Eerie #43-49 (1972-1973)
- Eerie #106 (1980s era)
- Eerie's Monster Gallery (1980) Werewolves feature

=== Cracked Magazine ===
- Cracked (artist)

Cover illustrations for Cracked, issue #35 (April 1964) - #154 (October 1978).
main interior artist (1958–2000)

== Awards and honors ==
Severin received an Inkpot Award in 1998 and was inducted into the Will Eisner Award Hall of Fame in 2003.

With writer Gary Friedrich and penciler Dick Ayers, Severin's inking contributed to Sgt. Fury and his Howling Commandos winning the Alley Award for Best War Title of 1967 and 1968.

He was among the winners of the Cartoon Art Museum's 2001 Sparky Award.

His artwork was exhibited three times at the Words & Pictures Museum in Northampton, Massachusetts – in the grand-opening group show (October 9, 1992 – January 5, 1993), in the group exhibit "War No More" (May 18 – August 8, 1993) and in the group show "Classic Comics: A Selection of Stories from EC Comics" (December 7 – February 11, 1996).

In 2022, Severin was awarded the Inkwell Awards Stacey Aragon Special Achievement Award (SASRA) for his lifetime achievement in inking.

Preceded by John Tartaglione	Sgt. Fury and his Howling Commandos inker 1967–1970	Succeeded by Frank Giacoia
Preceded by Herb Trimpe	The Incredible Hulk inker 1970–1972	Succeeded by Sal Trapani
