= Herb Trimpe =

American comics creator (1939–2015)

Deacon Herb Trimpe
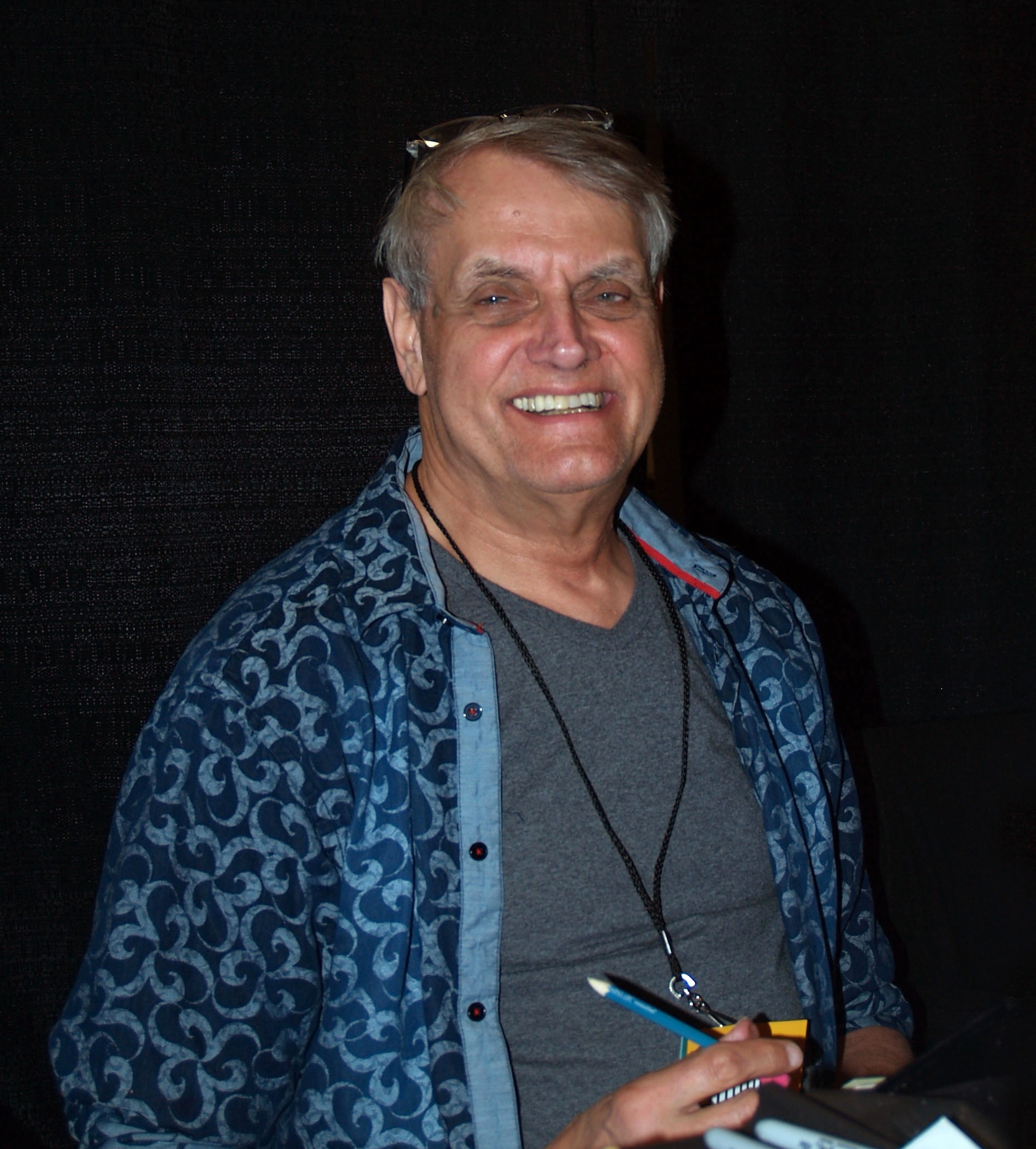
- Trimpe at the 2015 East Coast Comiccon, his last convention appearance
- Born: Herbert William Trimpe; May 26, 1939 Peekskill, New York, U.S.
- Died: April 13, 2015 (aged 75) Hurley, New York, U.S.
- Areas: Writer, Penciller, Inker
- Notable works: The Incredible Hulk; Wolverine; The Defenders; Son of Satan
- Awards: Bob Clampett Humanitarian Award, 2002; Inkpot Award, 2002

Herbert William Trimpe (/ˈtrɪmpi/; May 26, 1939 – April 13, 2015) was an American comics artist and occasional writer, best known as the seminal 1970s artist on The Incredible Hulk and as the first artist to draw for publication the character Wolverine, who later became a breakout star of the X-Men.

== Early life ==
Herb Trimpe was born May 26, 1939, in Peekskill, New York, the son of Anna (Jamison) and Herbert Trimpe. He graduated from Lakeland High School. His brother, Mike Trimpe, inked an Ant-Man story that Trimpe pencilled in Marvel Feature #6 (Nov. 1972). Of his childhood art and comics influences, he said in 2002, "I really loved the Disney stuff, Donald Duck and characters like that. Funny-animal stuff, that was kind of my favorite, and I liked to draw that kind of thing. And I also liked ... Plastic Man. ... I loved comics since I was a little kid, but I was actually more interested in syndicating a comic strip than working in comics." As well, "I was a really big fan of EC Comics and [artist] Jack Davis."

== Career ==
Trimpe commuted to New York City for three years to attend the School of Visual Arts. There, Trimpe recalled in 2002, instructor and longtime comics artist Tom Gill needed a student "to ink his backgrounds and stuff. So that's how I started, at Dell [Comics], doing mostly Westerns and also licensed books, like the adaptation of the movie Journey to the Center of the Earth."

Trimpe then enlisted in the United States Air Force "for four years," he recalled in 1997, "the standard enlistment time, from 1962 to 1966. I was a weatherman, and our unit was on loan, you might say, to the Army. We supplied aviation weather support to the First Air Cavalry Division based in the central highlands in Viet Nam. They used helicopters extensively to move troops around." He achieved the rank of Senior Airman.

Upon his discharge in October 1966, he learned that fellow SVA classmate John Verpoorten was working at Marvel Comics' production department, and

. . . said they were hiring freelance people, and I should come up to the office and show my work to Sol Brodsky, who was Stan [Lee]'s right-hand man at the time. . . . I was just preparing to put some material together and go to DC and Charlton when I got a call from Sol Brodsky, who was production chief. He said they needed somebody on staff in the production department to run the new photostat machine they had just bought, and to do some production work. I would primarily run the 'stat' machine and wouldn't be seated at a desk, but I would be able to pick up some freelance pencilling and inking. This kind of opened the door. The staff job didn't pay much by today's standards; I think it started at $135 dollars a week which wasn't as low as it sounds. Remember, it was 1966 and that was a fairly good entry-level salary.

His joining the Marvel production staff was announced in the "Bullpen Bulletins" of Marvel comics cover-dated June 1967, such as Fantastic Four #63. He remained associated with the company through 1996. While operating the Photostat camera in the Marvel offices, Trimpe did freelance inking for Marvel, and made his professional penciling debut with two Kid Colt stories in the Western series Kid Colt, Outlaw #134–135 (May and July 1967). Shortly thereafter, Trimpe and writer Gary Friedrich created Marvel's World War I aviator hero the Phantom Eagle in Marvel Super-Heroes #16 (Sept. 1968).

=== Hulk and the Silver Age of Comics ===
In the 1960s, during the period known as the Silver Age of Comics, Trimpe was assigned to pencil what became his signature character, the Hulk. Beginning with pencil-finishes over Marie Severin layouts in The Incredible Hulk vol. 2, #106 (Aug. 1968), he went on to draw the character for a virtually unbroken run of over seven years, through issue #142 (Aug. 1971), then again from #145–193 (Nov. 1971 – Nov. 1975). Additionally, Trimpe penciled the covers of five Hulk annuals (1969, 1971–72, 1976–77, titled King-Size Special! The Incredible Hulk except for #4, The Incredible Hulk Special), and both penciled and inked the 39-page feature story of The Incredible Hulk Annual #12 (Aug. 1983). Under the Marvel Method of writer-artist collaboration, Trimpe, like other Marvel artists of the time, was uncredited co-plotter of most of his stories, a working arrangement Trimpe said he enjoyed.

Among the characters co-created by Trimpe during his run on the title were Jim Wilson in issue #131 (Sept. 1970) and Doc Samson in #141 (July 1971). During his time on the comic, he became the first artist to draw for publication the character Wolverine, who would go on to become one of Marvel's most popular. The character was conceived by Roy Thomas, written by Len Wein and designed by Marvel de facto art director John Romita Sr. as an antagonist for the Hulk, introduced in the last panel of The Incredible Hulk vol. 2, #180 (Oct. 1974) and making his first full appearance the following issue. Trimpe in 2009 said he "distinctly remembers" Romita's sketch, and that, "The way I see it, [Romita and writer Len Wein] sewed the monster together and I shocked it to life! ... It was just one of those secondary or tertiary characters, actually, that we were using in that particular book with no particular notion of it going anywhere. We did characters in The [Incredible] Hulk all the time that were in [particular] issues and that was the end of them." Trimpe co-created nearly all of the characters introduced during his run on The Incredible Hulk, with Wolverine being a rare exception.

He said that he devised the military unit the Hulkbusters, which became a regular element of The Incredible Hulk:

[The series' writers] came up with the major concepts. I was not involved much with the creation of the new characters or new ideas. I didn't want to be. The concept of the Hulkbusters, however, was my idea. I did [the schematic diagram of the base]. I also designed the unit emblem, which was an "H" being shattered by a lightning bolt. You remember, "Thunderbolt" was [antagonist] General Ross' nickname. [The aerial-view design of the base as a peace symbol was used] purposefully as a design for the Hulkbuster base, but it really wasn't a joke. It was just meant as the ironic juxtaposition of a military base run by an aggressive, blustery general, and the military base design being a symbol of peace. It was like in the '60s and '70s when protesters stuck flowers down the barrels of National Guard rifles. It was a provocative gesture.

Trimpe also had a year's run on The Defenders (#68–81, February 1979 – March 1980), a superhero-team comic featuring the Hulk. He also drew the cover, featuring the Hulk, of the 1971 issue of Rolling Stone containing a major profile of Marvel Comics.

The artist in 2002 recalled a less-than-smooth start to his Hulk tenure: "I did, like, three or four pages, and Stan [Lee] saw them and made Frank Giacoia do the layouts [for Trimpe's fourth issue, #109, Nov. 1968]. It wasn't my storytelling, there was a good flow there, but it was too [much like] EC [Comics] for Stan. I loved EC, the dark atmosphere and clean lines of it. . . . But it wasn't right for Marvel."

=== Other Marvel work ===
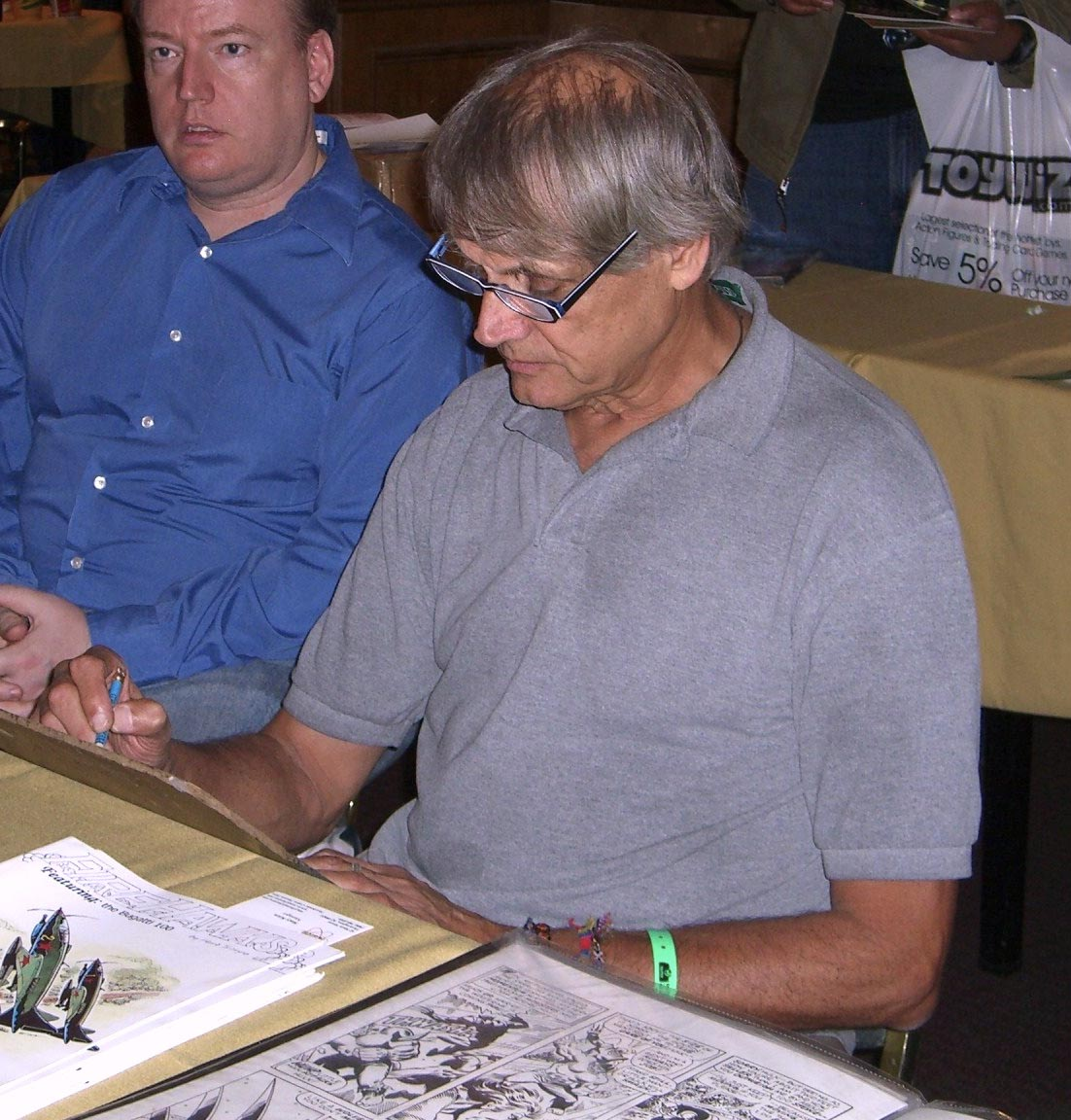
Trimpe sketching at the Big Apple Comic Con, October 2, 2010

As a Marvel mainstay, Trimpe would draw nearly every starring character, including Captain America (Captain America #184 and 291), the Fantastic Four (Fantastic Four Annual #25–26 in 1992–1993; Fantastic Four Unlimited #1–12 in 1993–1995), Iron Man (Iron Man #39, 82–85, and 93–94 in the 1970s, plus occasional others), Ka-Zar (Astonishing Tales #7–8, 1971), Nick Fury (Nick Fury, Agent of S.H.I.E.L.D. #13–15, 1969), Thor (Thor Annual #15–16, 1990–1991), Ant-Man (Marvel Feature #4–6), Killraven (Amazing Adventures #20–24, #33), Rawhide Kid, Spider-Man, and many more as the regular artist of Marvel Team-Up #106–118 (1981–1982) and Marvel Team-Up Annual #3–4 (1980–1981). As the artist of Super-Villain Team-Up, Trimpe co-created the Shroud with writer Steve Englehart. Captain Britain was introduced by Chris Claremont and Trimpe in an ongoing series published by Marvel UK. In 1976, Trimpe was one of the inkers of Captain America's Bicentennial Battles, an oversized treasury-format one-shot written and penciled by Jack Kirby. Trimpe drew Marvel Treasury Edition #25 (1980) "Spider-Man vs. the Hulk at the Winter Olympics" which featured a story set at the 1980 Winter Olympics by writers Mark Gruenwald, Steven Grant, and Bill Mantlo. Jack Kirby's Machine Man character was revived in a 1984 limited series drawn by Trimpe.

In the late 1970s and 1980s, Trimpe's Marvel work included licensed movie and TV franchises. He drew all but issues #4–5 of the 24-issue Godzilla (Aug. 1977 – July 1979); drew all but one of the 20-issue Shogun Warriors; six issues of The Further Adventures of Indiana Jones (also writing the last two); G.I. Joe: A Real American Hero #1 (July 1982) and eight other issues, three of which he also wrote or co-wrote; nearly the entire run of the 28-issue spin-off G.I. Joe Special Missions (1986–1989); three of the four-issue miniseries G.I. Joe: The Order of Battle (1986–1987); and three issues of The Transformers.

Trimpe, in a 1997 interview, described his Marvel arrangement: "I was a quota artist, which was non-contractual but [I] received a salary. I got a regular two-week check, and anything I did over quota I could voucher for as freelance income. I also had the extras, the company benefits. It was like a regular job, but I worked at home. It was a good deal."

=== 1990s–2015 ===
In the early 1990s, Trimpe worked on issues of The Mighty Thor, Avengers The 'Nam, Avengers West Coast, Incredible Hulk and Nick Fury, Agent of Shield, among others. In 1993, he became the regular artist on Fantastic Four Unlimited, written by Roy Thomas, and also pencilled the first two issues of Starblast.

After Fantastic Four Unlimited was cancelled in 1995, work for Marvel quickly dried up. When the company heavily downsized its staff in 1996, Herb Trimpe lost his quasi-staff position. Subsequently, he attended Empire State College, Hudson Valley Center, graduating with a bachelor's degree in Arts in 1997. He went on to a master's degree program at SUNY New Paltz. Beginning September 8, 1999, he taught art for two years at Eldred Central School in Sullivan County, New York. In 2000, he wrote an article for The New York Times about these experiences and ageism in comics.

In 2005, Trimpe returned to Marvel with a variant cover for New Avengers #9. Trimpe penciled BPRD: The War on Frogs (Aug. 2008) for Dark Horse Comics, and returned to his signature character by drawing the eight-page story "The Death and Life of the Abomination" in Marvel's King-Size Hulk #1 (July 2008), followed by a story for Hulk: Broken Worlds #1 in 2009. In December 2009, Trimpe, a Bugatti airplane enthusiast and member of the Bugatti Aircraft Association, published the eight-page comic book Firehawks, in which the Bugatti 100P plays a major role. This was followed by a second Firehawks comic, the 24-page Firehawks 2: Breath of the Dragon in 2012.

Trimpe's last convention appearance was at the April 2015 East Coast Comicon in Secaucus, New Jersey.

== Personal life ==
Sometime between 1969 and 1971, Trimpe was divorced from his first wife. In late 1972, Trimpe married Marvel Comics editorial assistant and writer Linda Fite, with whom he had three children. He later was married to Patricia, who survived him after his death. Trimpe's son, Alexander Spurlock "Alex" Trimpe, who co-pencilled RoboCop #11 (Jan. 1991), The Mighty Thor Annual #16 (1991), and Fantastic Four Unlimited #3 (Sept. 1993) with his father, is a member of the band The Chief Smiles. Trimpe's daughters Amelia Fite Trimpe and Sarah Trimpe were also in that band. At some point, Trimpe lived in Kerhonkson, New York, and afterward Hurley, New York.

Trimpe was ordained a deacon in the Episcopal Diocese of New York on May 30, 1992.

Trimpe died on April 13, 2015, aged 75.

== Awards ==
- Nomination, Shazam Award for Best Inker (Humor Division), 1973
- Won the 2002 "The Bob Clampett Humanitarian Award for his work as a chaplain at the World Trade Center site following the September 11 attacks.
- Inkpot Award, 2002

== Works ==
=== Big Apple Productions ===
- Big Apple Comix #1 (1975)

=== Dark Horse Comics ===
- B.P.R.D.: War on Frogs #1 (2008)
- Michael Chabon Presents: The Amazing Adventures of the Escapist #2–3 (illustrations for text story) (2004–2006)
- MySpace Dark Horse Presents #1 (The Goon story) (2008)

=== Dell Comics ===
- Four Color #1213 (Mysterious Island) (inks over Tom Gill) (1962)

=== Eclipse Comics ===
- Dinosaurs Attack #1 (1991)

=== IDW Publishing ===
- G.I. Joe: A Real American Hero Annual 2012 (2012)

=== Image Comics ===
- Crack Comics #63 (8-page story) (writer/artist as "Waldo Trimpe") (2011)
- Savage Dragon #200 (backup story) (2014)

=== Marvel Comics ===
- Amazing Adventures #20–24, 33 (full art); #30 (inks over P. Craig Russell) (Killraven) (1973–1975)
- The Amazing Spider-Man: Double Trouble (promo) (1993)
- Astonishing Tales #7–8 (Ka-Zar) (1971)
- The Avengers #333, Annual #6, 19, 21 (1976, 1991–1992)
- Avengers West Coast #75, 83 (1991–1992)
- Bizarre Adventures #31 (1982)
- Captain America #184, 291 (1975, 1984)
- Captain Britain #1–23 (Marvel UK) (1976–1977)
- Chamber of Darkness #2 (inks over Marie Severin) (1969)
- Crazy Magazine #4, 7 (inks over Marie Severin) (1974)
- Creatures on the Loose #11 (1971)
- Deadly Hands of Kung Fu Annual #1 (1974)
- Defenders #68–81 (1979–1980)
- The Draft #1 (1988)
- Fantastic Four Annual #25–26 (1992–1993)
- Fantastic Four Unlimited #1–7, 9–12 (1993–1995)
- Further Adventures of Indiana Jones #15–18, 23–24 (1984)
- G.I. Joe: A Real American Hero #1, 3–4, 6–8, 50, 99, 119 (1982–1991)
- G.I. Joe and the Transformers #1–4 (1986–1987)
- G.I. Joe: Special Missions #1–21, 23–26, 28 (1986–1989)
- G.I. Joe Yearbook #4 (1988)
- Ghost Rider #7 (also inks over Dick Ayers) (1967)
- Ghost Rider vol. 2 #60 (1981)
- Godzilla #1–3, 6–24 (1977–1979)
- Guardians of the Galaxy #28, Annual #2 (1992)
- Heroes for Hope Starring the X-Men #1 (1985)
- Hulk vol. 2 #23 (one page) (2008)
- Hulk: Broken Worlds #1 (2009)
- The Incredible Hulk #106–142, 145–193, 204, 393, Annual #6, 12, 16 (full art); #355 (inks over Jeff Purves) (1968–1992)
- Iron Man #39, 82–85, 93–94, 113, 199, 251–252, 255 (full art); #246 (inks over Bob Layton) (1971–1990)
- Kid Colt Outlaw #134–135 (full art); #138–139 (inks over Werner Roth) (1967–1968)
- Kingsize Hulk #1 (2008)
- Machine Man #1–3 (1984)
- Marvel Comics Presents #45 (1990)
- Marvel Feature #4–6 (Ant Man) (1972)
- Marvel Preview #13 ("The UFO Connection") (1978)
- Marvel Spotlight #12–13 (Son of Satan) (1973–1974)
- Marvel Super-Heroes #16 (Phantom Eagle) (1968)
- Marvel Super-Heroes #9 (the Avengers) (inks over Ron Wilson) (1992)
- Marvel Tales #131–133 (1981)
- Marvel Team-Up #106–118, Annual #3–4 (1981–1982)
- Marvel Treasury Edition #25 (Spider-Man and the Hulk) (1980)
- Marvel Treasury Special: Captain America's Bicentennial Battles (inks over Jack Kirby) (1976)
- Marvel Two-in-One #9, 14 (1975–1976)
- The 'Nam #49–51, 75 (also inks over Alex Trimpe) (1990–1992)
- NFL SuperPro #8–9 (1992)
- Nick Fury, Agent of S.H.I.E.L.D. #8, 13–15 (1969)
- Nick Fury, Agent of S.H.I.E.L.D. vol. 2 #16–19 (1990–1991)
- Official Handbook of the Marvel Universe #6, 9, 14 (1983–1984)
- Outlaw Kid #2 (1970)
- Planet of the Apes #21, 26–28 (1976–1977)
- The Rampaging Hulk #8 (1978)
- Rawhide Kid #62 (full art); #60 (inks over Dick Ayers); #64 (inks over Larry Lieber); #64, 67 (inks over Werner Roth) (1967–1968)
- Rawhide Kid #1–4 (1985)
- Robocop #11 (1991)
- Robotix #1 (writer/artist) (1986)
- Savage Tales vol. 2 #1–4 (writer/artist) (1985–1986)
- Sgt. Fury and his Howling Commandos #92 (1971)
- Shogun Warriors #1–14, 16–20 (1979–1980)
- Silver Surfer #18 (inks over Jack Kirby) (1970)
- The Spectacular Spider-Man #97–99 (1984–1985)
- Spitfire and the Troubleshooters #1–2, 5 (1986–1987)
- Spoof #3, 5 (inks over Marie Severin) (1973)
- Star Wars #17 (1978)
- Starblast #1–2 (1994)
- Strange Tales #157–160 (Doctor Strange) (inks over Marie Severin) (1967)
- Super-Villain Team-Up #4–7 (1976)
- Tales to Astonish #94–98 (the Hulk) (inks over Marie Severin) (1967)
- Thor #329, 336, 410, 415, 426, 431, Annual #15–16 (1983–1991)
- Transformers #11–12, 20 (1985–1986)
- Two-Gun Kid #89 (1967)
- U.S. 1 #1–2 (1983)
- War is Hell #13, 15 (1975)
- What If...? #2, 14, 23, 26 (1977–1981)
- X-Men #42 (inks over Werner Roth); Annual #16 (1968, 1992)
- X-Factor #126 (layouts) (1996)

=== Western Publishing ===
- Boris Karloff Thriller #2 (inks over Tom Gill) (1963)
- Fantastic Four in "The House Of Horrors" Big Little Book (illustrations) (1968)

=== TwoMorrows Publishing ===
- Streetwise OGN (one-page story) (writer/artist) (2000)

=== Trading cards ===
- Dinosaurs Attack (penciller) (Topps, 1988)

Preceded by Marie Severin	The Incredible Hulk vol. 2 artist 1968–1975	Succeeded by Sal Buscema
Preceded by Chic Stone	Iron Man artist 1976–1977	Succeeded by George Tuska
Preceded by Ed Hannigan	The Defenders artist 1979–1980	Succeeded by Don Perlin
Preceded by Carmine Infantino	Marvel Team-Up artist 1981–1982	Succeeded by Kerry Gammill
