= Gunhawks =

Fictional comic book characters

- Kid Cassidy and Reno Jones from Gunhawks #1, art by Syd Shores

Publication information
- Publisher: Marvel Comics
- Publication date: 1972-1973
- No. of issues: 7

The Gunhawks is the name of a pair of fictional comic book characters in the Western genre that first appeared in a self-titled series published by Marvel Comics.

== Original series ==
The Gunhawks were Kid Cassidy and Reno Jones. As introduced in Gunhawks #1 (1972), Cassidy was the son of a plantation-owning family in the antebellum American South, and Jones was an African American slave of the family who was friends with Cassidy. They fought together for the Confederate States of America during the American Civil War, with Jones fighting the Union because their soldiers had kidnapped his lover, Rachel Brown. After the war, they became wandering gunfighters, the Gunhawks, and continued searching for Rachel.

During the course of Gunhawks #6 (1973), Kid Cassidy was shot and killed in a confused conflict with Jones, and Jones was wrongly blamed for the crime. During the storyline in Avengers Forever, published from 1998 until 2000, the Avenger Hawkeye revealed that Cassidy had been killed prior to 1873.

With the next issue, the series was retitled to Reno Jones, Gunhawk, making Jones Marvel's second black character to have his own self-titled series, after Luke Cage, Hero for Hire (the Black Panther had taken over the lead in the Jungle Action series a few months prior, but the Panther's name was not included in the series' title). As it turned out, Reno Jones, Gunhawk #7 was also the final issue of the series, and the Gunhawks vanished into obscurity. A promised resolution to the storyline in Marvel Western Team-Up and a crossover with the Rawhide Kid was never published.

== Modern versions ==
In John Ostrander and Leonardo Manco's 2000 miniseries Blaze of Glory: The Last Ride of the Western Heroes, the Gunhawks returned, but with retcons in their previous history. It was "revealed" that the published adventures of the classic Marvel gunfighters, including the Gunhawks, had actually been dime novels based on the actual gunfighters' actions. The dime novels were right in essence, but they also heavily fictionalized various details. In the real version of events, Jones was actually a slave on Cassidy's family's plantation, the two men had only been friends as children, Jones never fought for the Confederacy (but still hated the Union) and he had actually shot Cassidy in self-defense, believing to have killed him. Reno Jones took up residence in the town of Wonderment, Montana, a town populated largely by freed slaves; there, he married a woman named Mary, and they had a son named Cass.

A corrupt businessman named Clay Riley - who had previously fought the original Ghost Rider as a costumed bandit called the Tarantula - sought to take the town's land by force. To this end, he hired a group of the Ku Klux Klan's Nightriders to kill the townfolk, prompting Jones to bring in a number of Western gunfighters to defend the town. One of those men was the Red Wolf, who had been a contemporary and ally of the deceased Ghost Rider. He provided Jones with the Rider's costume, knowing that this would give him a psychological advantage over Riley.

After many fatalities on both sides, Jones killed Riley and then unmasked the Nightriders' leader as Kid Cassidy. Before either could fully react, the Outlaw Kid stunned Cassidy, and Jones took the opportunity to strangle Cassidy to death. After the carnage was over, Jones returned the Ghost Rider costume and retired to take care of his family. Later, following the Apache Skies miniseries, the Rawhide Kid and the new Apache Kid entrusted the people of Wonderment with the care of a number of American Indian children who had been bound for U.S. government custody.

Even later, Kid Cassidy and Reno Jones appeared as ghosts in the middle of the War of the Realms event. Apparently Cassidy and Jones made peace once they were both dead.
