= War Is Hell (comics) =

Comic series

War is Hell
- War Is Hell #9, the first issue with original content, art by Gil Kane and Ernie Chan

Publication information
- Publisher: Marvel Comics
- Format: Ongoing series Limited series
- Genre: Anthology; Historical; Horror; War
- Publication date: January 1973-October 1975; May–September 2008 (The First Flight of Phantom Eagle)
- Main character(s): John Kowalski; Death; Phantom Eagle

Creative team
- Written by: Chris Claremont; Garth Ennis
- Penciller(s): Dick Ayers; Don Perlin; Herb Trimpe; Howard Chaykin
- Inker(s): Frank Springer; Herb Trimpe; Howard Chaykin

Collected editions
- War Is Hell: The First Flight of the Phantom Eagle: ISBN 0-7851-1643-5

War Is Hell is a horror/war comic book series released by Marvel Comics from 1973 to 1975. For its first six issues, it featured reprints of Marvel war comics, followed by two issues of reprints of Sgt. Fury and his Howling Commandos. Beginning in issue #9, the series featured new material; the star of the series became Death, who forces a dishonorably discharged Polish-American soldier named John Kowalski, killed in the invasion of Poland, to die countless deaths in other lives. A War Is Hell limited series featuring Phantom Eagle appeared in 2008. A one-shot issue of War is Hell was released in 2019 to commemorate the 80th anniversary of Marvel Comics, featuring a World War II story written and penciled by Howard Chaykin and a story set during the US intervention in Afghanistan written by Phillip Kennedy Johnson and penciled by Alberto Alburquerque.

== John Kowalski ==
During the series, Kowalski inhabits bodies of those about to die, not necessarily of the same side or sex, during World War II, including both the European and Pacific theatres, and needs to change things for the better before he is killed. Death summons him from the nether regions each story, and Kowalski wonders how many times he will have to do so. The series was created by writer Tony Isabella, but after successfully pitching the series and submitting his plot for the first issue, his new position as editor ate up a lot of his writing time. Isabella recalled that "Roy [Thomas, Marvel editor] wanted to give Dick Ayers a series to replace "It! The Living Colossus" and asked me to come up with a new series for War Is Hell. Dick and I had worked together on a number of things and enjoyed working with each other."

Chris Claremont, a former political theorist and historian, took over as the series's writer for the remainder of its run. According to Claremont, "The parameters were that we were going sequentially through the war. The rest was up to me."

"My Love Must Die", a story published in War Is Hell #12 in which Kowalski is brought together with his lost love and son, is generally considered the high point of the series. Penciller Don Perlin kept the original art for page 16 from the story in his home as one of his favorites.

The series was canceled with issue #15, which Claremont said was no surprise: "Nobody thought it would last more than six issues." Claremont's intentions for Kowalski were revealed when he wrote volume 2 of Man-Thing and incorporated the character into its final two issues (#s 10 & 11). By this point (the early 1980s), Kowalski had become an aspect of Death. He makes Barbie Bannister (a recently orphaned by murder rich girl introduced by Claremont in Man-Thing vol. 2 #5) another aspect of Death as they battle Sheriff John Daltry, who is possessed by the sword of Captain Fate. He causes the deaths of Doctor Strange, Man-Thing, Jennifer Kale, and Chris Claremont himself, although these deaths are undone by the end of the story, in order to battle Thog the Nether-Spawn, who is using Fate and Daltry as his pawns in another gambit to take over Earth-616. Other stories which Claremont had plans for before the series was cancelled included a story based in Vietnam as the U. S. troops were attempting to push back the Japanese invaders, and a story set in the Nazi concentration camps with a young Magneto playing a role.

Kowalski later appeared with Scarlet Witch in a story by Dennis Mallonee (writer) and John Ridgway (artist) in Solo Avengers #5.

=== Bibliography ===
- War Is Hell #9 – "War Is Hell!" Isabella, Thomas, Claremont, Gerber, Ayers, Springer (19 pp)
- War Is Hell #10 – "The Corridor" Isabella, Claremont, Ayers, Springer (18 pp)
- War Is Hell #11 – "Winter Kill" Claremont, Perlin, Trapani (18 pp)
- War Is Hell #12 – "My Love Must Die" Claremont, Perlin, Hunt (19 pp)
- War Is Hell #13 – "Today Is a Lovely Day to Die" Claremont and Trimpe (17 pp)
- War Is Hell #14 – "The Duty of a Man" Claremont and Evans (17 pp)
- War Is Hell #15 – "A Christmas Eve in Hell" Claremont and Trimpe (17 pp)
- Man-Thing vol. 2 #10 – "Came the Dark Man, Walkin', Walkin'..." Claremont, Perlin, Wiacek (22 pp)
- Man-Thing vol. 2 #11 – "Hell's Gate!" Claremont, Mayerik, Wiacek (22 pp)
- Solo Avengers #5 – "A Love That Never Dies" Mallonee and Ridgway (11 pp)

== Phantom Eagle ==
In 2008, a new five-issue limited series, titled War Is Hell: The First Flight of the Phantom Eagle, appeared under the MAX imprint. Phantom Eagle (Lt. Karl Kaufman) was a World War I hero created by Gary Friedrich and artist Herb Trimpe (artist) in 1968, and the new story was by Garth Ennis (writer) and Howard Chaykin (artist).

== Reprints ==
The series began as a reprint book, mostly from Atlas Comics-era war comics, adding Sgt. Fury for its last two issues before printing new material. The first six issues contained four stories an issue, each around five pages:

1. Reprinting stories from Battle #30 (1 story) and #55 (3 stories)
2. Reprinting stories from Battle Action #30, (1 story) Battlefront #30 (2 stories), and Battle #55 (1 story)
3. Reprinting stories from Battle Action #15 (1 story) and G.I. Tales #5 (3 stories)
4. Reprinting stories from Battleground #15 (3 stories), and War Comics #17 (1 story)
5. Reprinting stories from Battlefront #34 (1 story), and Battleground #20 (1 story) and # 18 (2 stories)
6. Reprinting stories from War Comics #30, "Court Martial" by Werner Roth, Battleground #15, and War Comics #17
7. Reprinting Sgt. Fury and his Howling Commandos #17
8. Reprinting Sgt. Fury and his Howling Commandos #18

== Collected editions ==
- War Is Hell: The First Flight of the Phantom Eagle collects War is Hell: The First Flight of the Phantom Eagle #1-5 (Marvel Max, hardcover, 120 pages, November 2008, ISBN 0-7851-1643-5)
- Marvel Ghost Stories includes War is Hell #9 (176 pages, October 2011, ISBN 978-0785156093)
- Marvel Universe by Chris Claremont includes War is Hell #9-15 (1144 pages, August 2017, ISBN 978-1302907150)
- Lost Marvels: Howard Chaykin Vol. 1: Dominic Fortune/Monark Starstalker/Phantom Eagle includes War Is Hell: The First Flight of the Phantom Eagle #1-5 (Fantagraphics, hardcover, 256 pages, August 2025, ISBN 979-8875000362)
