= Apache Kid (comics) =

The Apache Kid
- Apache Kid #2 (Feb. 1951), art by Werner Roth

Publication information
- Publisher: Marvel Comics
- First appearance: Two Gun Western #5 (Nov. 1950)
- Created by: John Buscema (art)

In-story information
- Alter ego: Alan Krandal
- Notable aliases: Aloysius Kare
The Apache Kid
Publication information
- Publisher: Atlas Comics
- Schedule: Bimonthly; hiatus from Jan. 1952 – Dec. 1954
- Format: Ongoing series
- Genre: Western
- Publication date: Dec. 1950 – Apr. 1956
- No. of issues: 19
- Main character: Apache Kid
Creative team
- Artist: Werner Roth

The Apache Kid (Alan Krandal) is a fictional Old West character appearing in American comic books published by Marvel Comics. The character has been mostly seen in stories from Marvel's 1950s precursor, Atlas Comics. This character was named after, but is unrelated to, the real-life Native American man known as the Apache Kid.

== Publication history ==
The Apache Kid (Alan Krandal) debuted as the cover feature, drawn by a young John Buscema, of Two-Gun Western #5 (cover-dated Nov. 1950). The writer co-creator is unknown. He received his own title the following month, premiering as The Apache Kid #53 (Dec. 1950, picking up the numbering from Reno Browne, Hollywood's Greatest Cowgirl) and then running as Apache Kid #2-19 (Feb. 1951 - Jan. 1952; Dec. 1954 - April 1956).

Stories also ran in the omnibus titles Two-Gun Western #5-9 (Nov. 1950 - Aug. 1951) and Wild Western #15-22 (April 1951 - June 1952). After that initial Buscema story and at least two by Joe Maneely (who would also do many of the later covers), the bulk of the book's run would be penciled and inked by future Silver Age X-Men artist Werner Roth.

After The Apache Kid ended with #19 (April 1956), its numbering continued as the anthology series Western Gunfighters, where the character did not appear.

Apache Kid reprints, however, did appear in Marvel's 1970s omnibus series also titled Western Gunfighters. The Kid shared its pages with new Ghost Rider (also known as Phantom Rider) stories, as well as anthological and Western-hero reprints of a changing lineup that included Atlas' Black Rider (here renamed Black Mask), the Western Kid, Wyatt Earp, and later Kid Colt. Apache Kid reprints ran from #2-33, the final issue (Oct. 1970 - Nov. 1975).

== Other versions ==
The character returned in Apache Skies (2002), a four-issue miniseries starring the Rawhide Kid and two persons called the Apache Kid: Dazii Aloysius Kare, and his wife, Rosa. This was a sequel to the miniseries Blaze of Glory (2000), which specifically retconned that the past Marvel Western stories of the 50s were dime novel fictions of the characters' actual lives.

Unrelated characters called the Apache Kid appeared in Fox Comics' Western Outlaws #21 (May 1949), and Youthful Comics' Indian Fighter #5 (Jan. 1952).

== Fictional character biography ==
Caucasian child Alan Krandal was raised by Apache chief Red Hawk and his wife after being orphaned. When grown, he took on a "civilian" identity as cowboy Aloysius Kare, changing to his warpaint outfit to fight outlaws both white and Native American, and generally protect both groups of people. Captain Bill Gregory of the nearby fort was his "white brother" who also respected the elder Red Hawk's counsel. Krandal had an on-off relationshipwith the Apache maiden White Swan, who loved the Apache Kid and despised Krandal. Unlike many other Western comics of the 1950s, Apache Kid generally presented the indigenous Americans in the same light as Caucasians, and made distinctions among the various tribes.

In Apache Skies, it was retconned that Dazii Aloysius Kare was a mixed ancestry man, part caucasian and part Apache. He also married another mixed-blood woman called Rosa, who continued his legacy when he was killed by a corrupt businessman.
