= Outlaw Kid =

The Outlaw Kid

Publication information
- Publisher: Marvel Comics
- First appearance: The Outlaw Kid #1 (September 1954)
- Created by: Doug Wildey (art)

In-story information
- Alter ego: Lance Temple
The Outlaw Kid
Publication information
- Publisher: Atlas Comics / Marvel Comics
- Schedule: Bimonthly
- Format: Ongoing series
- Genre: Western
- Publication date: Sept. 1954 – Oct. 1975
- No. of issues: (vol. 1) 19 (vol 2.) 30
- Main character: Outlaw Kid
Creative team
- Artist: Doug Wildey

The Outlaw Kid is a fictional Western hero appearing in American comic books published by Marvel Comics. The character originally appeared in the company's 1950s iteration, Atlas Comics. A lesser-known character than the company's Kid Colt, Rawhide Kid or Two-Gun Kid, he also starred in a reprint series in the 1970s and a short-lived revival.

The Outlaw Kid was Lance Temple, an Old West lawyer and Civil War veteran living with his blinded father on a ranch. Though promising his father he would never take up a gun, he nonetheless felt the need to right wrongs expediently on the near-lawless frontier, and created a masked identity in order to keep his gunslinging secret.

== Publication history ==
The Outlaw Kid began his publication in the 50s, as a reboot effort of the previous western hero Texas Kid published in 1950. Texas Kid was also a masked hero, but hispanic-themed. He was also named "Lance Temple" and had the same backstory and supporting charactersto Outlaw Kid. With time, Outlaw Kid would become his own character with his own characterisation and in 1970 his backstory would be retconned.

Comic-book artist Doug Wildey, later a noted animation designer, illustrated three to four stories per issue of the 19-issue series The Outlaw Kid (cover dated Sept. 1954-Sept. 1957). Joe Maneely provided most of the covers. Backup features were usually "The Black Rider," drawn by Syd Shores, or an anthological Western tale. An additional Outlaw Kid story appeared in Wild Western #43 (May 1955). Well over a year after the original series ended, two other Outlaw Kid stories by Wildey, presumably from inventory, saw print, in Kid Colt, Outlaw #82 (Jan. 1959) and Wyatt Earp #24 (Aug. 1959).

Comics historian Ken Quattro called the series Wildey's most "noteworthy" Western work:

In concept, it was typical of all the Stan Lee-created Kids (Colt, Rawhide, Two-Gun, Ringo, etc.). What set it apart was Wildey's art. ... The Outlaw Kid was a monthly opportunity for Wildey to hone and develop his burgeoning art skills. Using Outlaw Kid #11 (May, 1956) as an example of his work well into the series, the influence of cinema on his work is evident. Though he may have had this influence all along, now it is readily apparent, with panels staged like film scenes. The characters have a realistic, illustrative look to them. ... Most significantly, his artwork finally had the consistent luster of professionalism. Wildey varied his inking from the fine stroke of an etching to the bold use of solid blacks to attain dramatic chiaroscuro effects.

Outlaw Kid was Lance Temple, the son of Zane Temple, veteran of the Texas Revolution war and survivor of the Alamo. Zane wasblinded and his wife was killed in an attack by a violent outlaw gang. Lance and Zane were saved taken care by the Outlaws Emilio Diaz and Red hawk. They would teach the young Lance how to shoot and ride. But Zane would denounce violence and make his son to swear never to use guns. To take revenge on the killers of his mother, Lance created the persona of Outlaw Kid, intending to not disturb his old father. Lance also tried to romance the newcomer neighbor Belle Taylor, who liked him but disliked his apparent cowardice and encouraged him to be more like the masked Outlaw Kid.

When Marvel began reprinting the series in The Outlaw Kid vol. 2, #1–30 (Aug. 1970 – Oct. 1975), it became the best-selling among the company's Western reprints. Gil Kane, John Severin and Herb Trimpe, among others, provided new cover art. When the 1950s Wildey material ran out, Marvel commissioned new stories, by writer Mike Friedrich, followed by the unrelated Gary Friedrich, with art by Marvel Western veteran Dick Ayers. Yet with these new stories, in issues #10–16 (Oct. 1972 – June 1973), sales dropped, after which the title began re-reprinting Wildey's work. Wildey reprints also appeared in the 1970s Marvel series Mighty Marvel Western (#9) and Western Gunfighters.

The Outlaw Kid reappeared in the four-issue limited series Blaze of Glory: The Last Ride of the Western Heroes (2000), by writer John Ostrander and artist Leonardo Manco, which specifically retconned MANY OF THE Marvel Western stories of years past as dime novel fictions based on the characters' actual lives. Lance had married his girlfriend Belle Taylor and had a son with her. However, it was revealed here that Temple's father, Hoot (who did not want him gunslinging, had died from the shock of learning of his son's alter ego, and that a guilt-wracked Lance Temple, blaming himself for his father's death, developed a split personality and was unaware he was the Outlaw Kid. Indeed, he was actually searching for the Outlaw Kid in the miniseries. He dies in the last issue, helping defend the town of Wonderment. His last act was to use dynamite to kill some opponents, noting his father would have been happy he did not use a gun. As series writer John Ostrander explained,

The Outlaw Kid was once described as the closest thing in the Old West to Spider-Man. He had a father who so disapproved of guns that the character created the Outlaw Kid, and would only use guns when he was The Outlaw Kid. In my version of it, he's gone a little bit over the edge, in that his father eventually found out, and the heart attack killed him, and he's devised the Outlaw Kid into a whole different personality. And in his regular personality, he thinks the Outlaw Kid is the killer, so he's hunting himself through the miniseries.

== Legacy ==
The mutant Outlaw of Agency X is a descendant of the Outlaw Kid.

== List of Doug Wildey's Outlaw Kid stories ==
This list is incomplete.

- The Outlaw Kid #1 (Sept. 1954)

"The Beginning!"
"Jaws of Death!"
"A Killer's Trap!"

- The Outlaw Kid #2 (Nov. 1954)

"The Fast Gun!" a.k.a. "The Fast Draw" (rep. Vol. 2, #3)
"Redman's Revenge!"
"Fury at Echo Pass!"

- The Outlaw Kid #3 (Jan. 1955)(rep. Vol. 2, #1)

"Hostage"
"Breakthrough"
"Showdown"

- The Outlaw Kid #4 (Mar. 1955)

[cover]
"Ghost Town"
"Death Battle"
"Rruummbblle"

- The Outlaw Kid #5 (May 1955)(rep. Vol. 2, #2)

"Two of a Kind"
"The Newcomers"
"Flames of Violence"

- The Outlaw Kid #8 (Nov. 1955)

"Helping Hand"
"Gun Law"
"The Outsider"

- The Outlaw Kid #10 (March 1956)(rep. Vol. 2, #3)

"The Fast Draw"
"Renegade Rout"
"Stand Up and Fight"
"The Man Behind the Guns"

- The Outlaw Kid #11 (May 1956) (rep. Vol. 2, #4)

"Losers Take Nothing"
"Six-gun Gamble"
"Fang and Claw"
"The Riddle of Scorpion Creek"

- The Outlaw Kid #12 (July 1956)

"Six-Gun Menace"
"The Riddle of Fargo Pass"
"Badman's Choice"
"Range War"

- The Outlaw Kid #13 (Sept. 1956)

"Flames Along the Border"
"Bully's Bluff" (rep. Vol. 2, #7, Aug. 1971)
"Scourge of the Plains"
"Appointment With Danger"

- The Outlaw Kid #14 (Nov. 1956)

"Whistling Lead"
"Gunning for Trouble"
"Gun Duel"
"The Land Grabbers"

- The Outlaw Kid #15 (Jan. 1957)

"Duel in the Desert"
"Guns For Hire"
"Six-Gun Challenge"
"Along The Outlaw Trail"

- The Outlaw Kid #16 (Mar. 1957)

"Six-Gun Meeting"
"Redmen on the Rampage"
"Treachery on the Trail"
"Law and Order"

- The Outlaw Kid #17 (May 1957)

"Gunning For Trouble"
"Empty Holsters"
"Fists of Steel"
"Showdown at Sunup"

- The Outlaw Kid #18 (July 1957)

"Menace on Main Street"
"The Ambushers Strike"
"Six-Gun PayoFf"
"The Kid's Revenge"

- The Outlaw Kid #19 (Sept. 1957)

"When the Owlhoots Rode"
"Revenge of the Redmen"
"Gun Crazy"
"Treachery in Caliber City"

- Wyatt Earp #24 (Aug. 1959)

"The Man Behind the Guns" (reprint #10?)

REPRINTS

Information will go above when sourced.

- The Outlaw Kid Vol. 2, #5 (April 1971)

"Empty holsters!"
"Fists of steel!"
"Showdown at Sunup!"
"Gunning for Trouble!"

- The Outlaw Kid Vol. 2, #6 (June 1971; re-reprinted #22, June 1974)

"Redmen on the Rampage!"
"Six-Gun Meeting!"
"Law and Order!"

- The Outlaw Kid Vol. 2, #9 (Dec. 1971; re-reprinted #25, Dec. 1974)

"Gun Law"
"The Outsider"

- The Outlaw Kid Vol. 2, #10 (June 1972)

"The Origin of the Outlaw Kid"
