= Leatherneck Raiders =

Fictional comic book WW II military unit

Publication information
- Publisher: Marvel Comics
- First appearance: Captain Savage and his Leatherneck Raiders #1 (Jan. 1968)
- Created by: Gary Friedrich; Dick Ayers

In-story information
- Type of organization: Marine unit

The Leatherneck Raiders are a fictional World War II unit appearing in American comic books published by Marvel Comics. Created by Gary Friedrich and Dick Ayers, they were a specially trained tactical commando squad. "Leatherneck" is a military slang term for a member of the United States Marine Corps, the Marine Raiders were a special World War II unit. The character Captain Savage is unrelated to the 1939 Fox Feature Syndicate character of that name.

== Publication history ==
Captain Savage's first appearance in Marvel Comics was in Sgt. Fury #10 "On to Okinawa" as the submarine captain that aids Fury and his team. The Leatherneck Raiders starred in their own Marvel Comics series, Captain Savage and his Leatherneck Raiders, which ran 19 issues from Jan. 1968 – Mar. 1970. The title of the comic changed to Captain Savage and his Battlefield Raiders with issue #9 with Savage shaving off his beard. Savage regrew his beard in the last issue, #19. A proposal to have a Captain Savage of the Silent Service with Savage as a submarine commander was not taken up.

== Fictional team history ==
The Leathernecks were commanded by U.S. Navy submarine Captain Simon Savage, who modeled his squad after his one-time associate Nick Fury's Howling Commandos. Savage had appeared in several of the Howling Commando issues as the commander of the USS Sea Wolf, a submarine taking them on missions.

Although the Leatherneck Raiders (also known as the "Leathernecks" and the "Battlefield Raiders") were an effective fighting force in World War II, they never achieved the recognition that the Howling Commandos received.

In the premiere issue, the Raiders fought on Tarawa. The 2nd, 3rd and 4th issues had the Raiders come across Baron Strucker and HYDRA on a Pacific Island.

Savage, now shown in a Marine Corps uniform bearing both Captain's bars and what appear to be First Sergeant stripes, appeared in Fall of the Hulks: Gamma at the funeral of General Thaddeus "Thunderbolt" Ross. He mentions that he was once a "lowly 'captain'", even though that Naval rank is much higher than either of the contradictory ranks shown on his uniform.

== Team members ==
Aside from Captain Savage, the team consisted of:

- Private Lee Baker (who was killed in action)
- Corporal Jacques Larocque
- Private Jay Little Bear
- Seaman Roy "Blarney" Stone
- Sgt. Sam "Yakkety" Yates

Australian character Rolfe Harrison appeared in a couple issues with the Raiders but never joined their ranks.
