= Captain Savage and his Leatherneck Raiders =

World War II comic book

- The cover to Captain Savage and his Leatherneck Raiders #1, art by Dick Ayers and Syd Shores.

Publication information
- Publisher: Marvel Comics
- Schedule: Monthly
- Publication date: 1968
- No. of issues: 19
- Main character(s): Captain Savage; Leatherneck Raiders

Creative team
- Created by: Gary Friedrich; Dick Ayers
- Written by: Gary Friedrich; Arnold Drake; Archie Goodwin
- Artist: Dick Ayers
- Penciller(s): Dick Ayers; Don Heck
- Inker(s): Sydney 'Syd' Shores; John Powers Severin
- Letterer(s): Art 'Artie' Simek; Gaspar Saladino; Irving 'Irv' Watanabe; Herb Cooper; Sam Rosen; Jean Izzo
- Colorist: Several uncredited
- Editor: Stan Lee

Captain Savage and his Leatherneck Raiders is a World War II comic book published by Marvel Comics. The series lasted for nineteen issues, from January 1968 to March 1970. By issue #9 the name was switched to Captain Savage and his Battlefield Raiders. Created by Gary Friedrich and Dick Ayers, the book was a spin-off of the series Sgt. Fury and his Howling Commandos which they wrote at the time. The series was launched when Marvel suddenly received the ability to publish more titles than they had previously due to an embargo.

== Publication history ==
Per issue:

1. The Last Banzai, January 1968
2. The Return of Baron Strucker, March 1968
3. Two Against HYDRA, May 1968
4. Holocaust On Hydra Island, July 1968
5. Mission: Destroy the Invisible Enemy, August 1968
6. Mission: Save a Howler, September 1968
7. Objective: Ben Grimm, October 1968
8. Mission: Foul Ball, November 1968
9. The Gun-Runner, December 1968
10. To the Last Man, January 1969
11. Death of a Leatherneck!, February 1969
12. Pray For Simon Savage!, March 1969
13. The Junk-Heap Juggernauts, April 1969
14. Savage's First Mission, May 1969
15. Within the temple waits... death!, July 1969
16. War Is Hell—On Ice, September 1969
17. The unsinkable Jay Little Bear!, November 1969
18. The high cost of fighting!, January 1970
19. They Serve in Silence, March 1970

== Plot ==
The series focuses on the characters of the elite Marine Corps team the Leatherneck Raiders and their lives in the Pacific theater of World War II.

== Reception ==
Sales for the series were decent and a proposal to have a Captain Savage of the Silent Service series as a follow-up was made, with Savage as a submarine commander, but it was not taken up. Pierre Comtois, the author of the book "Marvel Comics in the 1970s" states that the series was an early experiment from Marvel before they realized that the superhero genre would be the one to dominate the comics market in the foreseeable future. Comtois praised Ayers' artwork and described the dialogue as "smooth and natural sounding", also stating that the plot generally moved forward properly without leaving plot threads hanging. Comtois hypothesised that the series was cancelled due to changing societal norms, such as anti-war sentiment, something which affected many war comics at the time.

== See also ==
- Combat Kelly and the Deadly Dozen, another spin-off of Sgt. Fury
