= Gary Friedrich =

American comic book writer (1943–2018)

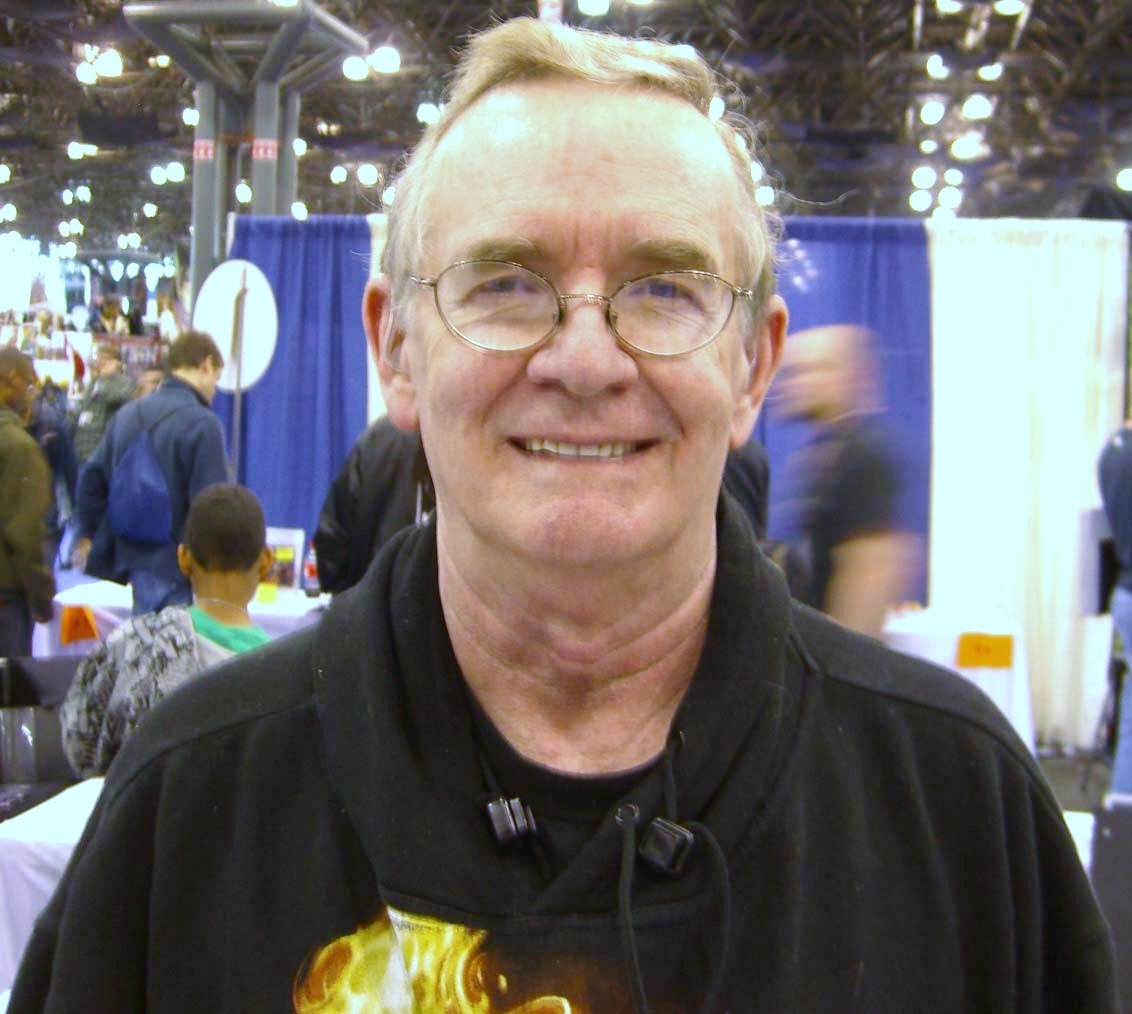
- Gary Friedrich at the April 2008; New York Comic Con
- Born: August 21, 1943 Jackson, Missouri, U.S.
- Died: August 29, 2018 (aged 75) St. Louis, Missouri, U.S.
- Area: Writer
- Notable works: Sgt. Fury and his Howling Commandos, The Monster of Frankenstein, Ghost Rider
- Awards: Shared Alley Award for Sgt. Fury as Best War Title (1967 and 1968); Inkpot Award (2007); Bill Finger Award (2010)

Gary Friedrich (/ˈfriːdrɪk/; August 21, 1943 – August 29, 2018) was an American comic book writer best known for his Silver Age stories for Marvel Comics' Sgt. Fury and his Howling Commandos and in the following era, the series The Monster of Frankenstein, as well as for cocreating the supernatural motorcyclist Ghost Rider and the supernatural hero the Son of Satan.

Friedrich – no relation to fellow comics writer Mike Friedrich – was the first successful new writer brought into the burgeoning 1960s Marvel after fellow Missourian Roy Thomas. Succeeding Thomas on Sgt. Fury, Friedrich and the art team of Dick Ayers and John Severin produced a World War II series for the Vietnam years, combining militaristic camaraderie and gung ho humor with a regretful sense of war as a terrible last resort. The humanistic military drama was noted for its semi-anthological "The" stories, such as "The Medic" and "The Deserter".

Friedrich went on to write a smattering of superhero stories for Marvel, Atlas/Seaboard Comics and Topps Comics, and eventually left the comics industry. In 2011, he lost a federal lawsuit over a claim of ownership in the character Ghost Rider, but in July 2014, three months after an appellate court reversed that decision, the parties said they had reached a settlement.

== Early life ==
Gary Friedrich was born on August 21, 1943, the son of Jerry and Elsie Friedrich. He was born and raised in Jackson, Missouri, where he graduated from Jackson High School in 1961. He was editor of the high school newspaper and a member of the marching band. As a teen, he was a friend of future Marvel Comics writer and eventual editor-in-chief Roy Thomas.

Friedrich worked at a record store in Cape Girardeau, Missouri after high school, and in February 1964, obtained a job at Jackson's two weekly newspapers, which were being combined into a single twice-weekly. "I was working about 80 hours a week for $50", he recalled in 2001. "I wrote, edited, and laid out the entire newspaper. I was the whole editorial staff without any help. It was driving me crazy". Friedrich had gotten married the year before and by now had a young son, but, "I didn't have time for anything because I was working all the damn time". The marriage fell apart, "and even that wasn't a major problem for a while because I was so damn busy and I was either working, drunk, or both", Friedrich said, alluding to the alcoholism from which he began recovering on "New Year's night in 1979".

When the newspaper ceased publication in late summer 1965, Friedrich began working a union job at a Cape Girardeau factory, installing heating elements in waffle irons. Roy Thomas, now a Marvel Comics staff writer in New York City, called his friend with the suggestion that freelance work might exist in the newly resurgent medium. Friedrich took a Greyhound bus the following day, and stayed with Thomas and a fandom friend, Dave Kaler, in Manhattan's East Village. Shortly afterward, Friedrich and Thomas took an apartment on Bleecker Street in Greenwich Village.

This was a time of transition between the beat movement and the hippie era, when the Village flourished as a creative mecca. "The Village was a really neat place to be at that time. We went to the theater that was to become the Fillmore East; it wasn't called that yet, but they were starting to have some rock concerts, like Chuck Berry. ... I began to let my hair grow and become a real New York hippie", he recalled.

== Comics career ==
After Thomas recommended Friedrich to Charlton Comics editor Dick Giordano, Friedrich began writing romance comics for that low-budget publisher, where many pros got early breaks. "I did it with a great good sense of humor", Friedrich recalled. "I wrote things like 'Tears in My Malted' and 'Too Fat to Frug'...." With anonymous help and input from Thomas, Friedrich also began writing superhero stories, beginning with his backup feature "The Sentinels" (with penciler-inker Sam Grainger) in Peter Cannon ... Thunderbolt #54 (Oct. 1966). He wrote the feature for two more issues before handing it off. Friedrich also dialogued the debut and the next three stories of the Blue Beetle, plotted and drawn by Steve Ditko, in Captain Atom #83–86 (Nov. 1966 – June 1967). Friedrich's last recorded Charlton story was "If I Had Three Wishes", penciled by Ditko, in Ghostly Tales #60 (March 1967).

=== Marvel Comics ===
By this time Friedrich had already begun writing Westerns for Marvel, including issues of Kid Colt, Outlaw; Two-Gun Kid; Rawhide Kid; and his first regular series, the Western Ghost Rider – launched with debut-issue co-plotter Thomas, and running six issues, mostly co-scripted by Friedrich and series penciler Dick Ayers. Friedrich also contributed to the parody series Not Brand Echh. He began on Sgt. Fury and his Howling Commandos with #42 (May 1967) – co-scripted, as was the next issue, by Friedrich's Western partner, Sgt. Fury penciler Ayers. The next issue, a flashback to the Howlers' first mission, was co-scripted by Friedrich and Thomas.

Following this inauspicious beginning came the first of several Friedrich "The" stories, "The War Lover" (#45, Aug. 1967) – a shaded exploration of a trigger-happy soldier and the line drawn, even in war, between killing and murder. Daring for the time, when majority public sentiment still supported the undeclared Vietnam War, the story balanced present-day issues while demonstrating that even in what is referred to as "a just war", a larger morality prevails. His story for issue #72 (Nov. 1969) was heavily rewritten and partially redrawn due to concerns about possible copyright infringement of the film Casablanca. Friedrich continued through #83 (Jan. 1971), with the late part of this run having reprint issues between new stories, and again for the even-numbered issues from #94–114 (Jan. 1972 – Nov. 1973). Issue #100 (July 1972) featured a present-day, fictional reunion gala.

Friedrich also launched the 19-issue World War II United States Marines series Capt. Savage and his Leatherneck Raiders (Jan. 1968 – March 1970; changed to Captain Savage and his Battlefield Raiders with #9); and the nine-issue World War II U.S. Army series Combat Kelly and the Deadly Dozen ( June 1972 – Sept. 1973).

Friedrich settled into the niche of utility writer. His first regular superhero series for Marvel was The Incredible Hulk vol. 2, for which he wrote a handful of issues starting with #102 (April 1968; the premiere issue, following the Hulk feature in the "split book" Tales to Astonish), as well as the 1968 annual The Incredible Hulk Special #1. The series would not, however, launch him as Thomas' natural successor on Marvel's flagship titles, which went to such later hires as Gerry Conway, Steve Englehart, Len Wein, and Marv Wolfman. Friedrich mostly would be assigned titles in transition or facing cancellation, including, variously, [Uncanny] X-Men; Captain America; Captain Marvel; Daredevil; Nick Fury, Agent of S.H.I.E.L.D.; and the "Black Widow" feature in Amazing Adventures. He was also given many non-superhero features, including such Westerns as The Gunhawks and co-created the Phantom Eagle with Herb Trimpe.

Friedrich was the co-creator and initial writer of Marvel's motorcycle-demon Ghost Rider, and later teamed with that character's first artist, Mike Ploog, on Marvel's The Monster of Frankenstein – the first five issues of which (Jan.-Oct. 1973) contained a relatively faithful adaptation of Mary Shelley's novel. As one critic wrote of issue #4: "Unmatched by anything else he'd written at Marvel, Friedrich's script ... had reached a point that perfectly captured the 19th-century cadences of Shelley's prose and lifted the strip far above any past or, so far, future attempt to adapt the character to comics". Friedrich co-created the supernatural hero the Son of Satan in Ghost Rider vol. 2, #1 (Sept. 1973). (Note: Accounts of how the Son of Satan was created vary on certain points. Most prominently, Roy Thomas claims that Friedrich co-created the character with Herb Trimpe, but Trimpe denies this and credits Friedrich as sole creator.) Friedrich recalled in 2009 that Marvel editor-in-chief Stan Lee "had some idea that he wanted a character called Son of Satan. I have no idea why or where it came from. All he really had was the name and he wanted us to create a character based around that. I guess it just popped in his mind. He said "I want a title called Son of Satan. Do it!"

In the mid-1970s, he also wrote the majority of the seven-page Captain Britain stories in the character's namesake Marvel UK weekly comic book following the departure of original writer Chris Claremont.

=== Other work ===
Friedrich's work for other publishers includes writing for the Skywald line of black-and-white horror-comics magazines. For that company he created Hell-Rider – a Vietnam-vet vigilante motorcyclist with a flame-thrower-equipped bike – in a namesake two-issue series (July–Aug. to Sept.-Oct. 1971). The following year, Friedrich worked with Thomas on the similarly motorcycle-mounted Ghost Rider.

Additionally, Friedrich freelanced for the short-lived Atlas/Seaboard Comics, where he wrote the crime comic Police Action #2–3 (April and June 1975) and the feature "Son of Dracula" in Fright #1 (June 1975), and scripted the sole story of the character Man-Monster, co-plotted by Tony Isabella and penciller Rich Buckler, in Tales of Evil #3 (July 1975). He also wrote the second and final issue of The Cougar, the third and final issue of Morlock 2001, with the rare art team of Steve Ditko and Bernie Wrightson; the third and final issue of The Brute; and the fourth and final issue of IronJaw (all July 1975).

=== Later career ===
Friedrich left comics in 1978 and returned to Missouri, where he eventually spent many years as a driver/courier in the St. Louis area. In 1993, Friedrich scripted Topps Comics' Jack Kirby-created Bombast #1 (April 1993), where he teamed once more with plotter Roy Thomas and Sgt. Fury artists Dick Ayers and John Severin.

=== Ownership contention ===
In the 2000s, Friedrich expressed public disagreement about the genesis of the supernatural Ghost Rider. In 2001, Roy Thomas claimed that:

I had made up a character as a villain in Daredevil – a very lackluster character – called Stunt-Master ... a motorcyclist. Anyway, when Gary Friedrich started writing Daredevil, he said, 'Instead of Stunt-Master, I'd like to make the villain a really weird motorcycle-riding character called Ghost Rider.' He didn't describe him. I said, 'Yeah, Gary, there's only one thing wrong with it,' and he kind of looked at me weird, because we were old friends from Missouri, and I said, 'That's too good an idea to be just a villain in Daredevil. He should start out right away in his own book.' When Gary wasn't there the day we were going to design it, Mike Ploog, who was going to be the artist, and I designed the character. I had this idea for the skull-head, something like Elvis' 1968 special jumpsuit, and so forth, and Ploog put the fire on the head, just because he thought it looked nice. Gary liked it, so they went off and did it.

Friedrich responded:

Well, there's some disagreement between Roy, Mike and I over that. I threatened on more than one occasion that if Marvel gets in a position where they are gonna make a movie or make a lot of money off of it, I'm gonna sue them, and I probably will. ... It was my idea. It was always my idea from the first time we talked about it; it turned out to be a guy with a flaming skull and [who] rode a motorcycle. Ploog seems to think the flaming skull was his idea. But, to tell you the truth, it was my idea.

Ploog recalled, in a 2008 interview:

Now, there's been all kinds of dialog about who was the creator of Ghost Rider. Gary Friedrich was the writer on it. ... The flaming skull: That was the big area of dispute. Who thought of the flaming skull? To be honest with you I can't remember. What else were you going to do with him? You couldn't put a helmet on him, so it had to be a flaming skull. As far as his costume went, it was part of the old [Western] Ghost Rider's costume, with the Western panel front. The stripes down the arms and the legs were there merely so I could make the character['s costume] as black as I possibly could and still keep track of his body. It was the easiest way to design him.

On April 4, 2007, Friedrich filed a lawsuit in the U.S. District Court for the Southern District of Illinois against Marvel Enterprises, Sony Pictures, Columbia TriStar Motion Pictures, Relativity Media, Crystal Sky Pictures, Michael De Luca Productions, Hasbro and Take-Two Interactive, alleging his copyrights to the Ghost Rider character have been exploited and utilized in a "joint venture and conspiracy". The lawsuit states that the film rights and merchandising reverted from Marvel to him in 2001. The case was transferred to the United States District Court for the Southern District of New York on February 14, 2008, and Friedrich amended the complaint on March 25, 2011.

The suit concluded on December 28, 2011, with Marvel prevailing on all but one count. U.S. District Judge Katherine B. Forrest ruled that Marvel Entertainment owned the character, saying Friedrich gave up any ownership claim when he signed checks containing language relinquishing all rights. She said Friedrich had also signed a 1978 agreement with Marvel relinquishing rights. Marvel countersued with the parties reaching a settlement in which Marvel dropped the suit in exchange for Friedrich paying $17,000 in damages, ceasing to sell Ghost Rider-related items of his own creation and ceasing to promote himself as the creator of the character for financial gain. Friedrich was allowed to sell his autograph on officially licensed Ghost Rider merchandise.

On June 11, 2013, Second Circuit Court of Appeals Judge Denny Chin overturned the original decision, calling the contract language "ambiguous" and sending the case back to trial. set for November. On September 6, Friedrich's attorney told the court both parties "have amicably agreed to resolve all claims".

== Personal life ==
As of 2009, Friedrich lived in Jefferson County, Missouri with wife Jean and daughter, Leslie. He died on August 29, 2018, in St. Louis, Missouri. He had been suffering from Parkinson's disease and near-total hearing loss.

== Awards ==
- Sgt. Fury and his Howling Commandos, written by Friedrich beginning with issue #42 (cover-dated May 1967 and on sale two to three months prior), won the Alley Award for Best War Title in 1967 and 1968.
- Inkpot Award 2007
- Bill Finger Award 2010

== Books ==
=== Nonfiction ===
- Brown, Len, and Gary Friedrich, Encyclopedia of Rock & Roll (Tower Publications, 1970)
- Brown, Len, and Gary Friedrich, Encyclopedia of Country and Western Music (Tower Publications, 1971)
- Brown, Len, and Gary Friedrich, So You Think You Know About Rock and Roll (Tower Publications, 1972)

=== Fiction ===
- Nashville Breakdown (Manor Books, 1977)

== Comics bibliography ==
=== Atlas/Seaboard ===
- Barbarians #1 (1975)
- Brute #3 (1975)
- Cougar #2 (1975)
- Fright #1 (1975)
- Ironjaw #4 (1975)
- Morlock 2001 #3 (1975)
- Phoenix #4 (1975)
- Police Action #2–3 (1975)
- Tales of Evil #3 (1975)
- Weird Suspense #3 (1975)

=== Charlton ===
- Captain Atom #83–86 (1966–1967)
- Career Girl Romances #38–39 (1967)
- Ghostly Tales #60–61 (1967)
- Go-Go #4–6 (1966–1967)
- I Love You #64 (1966)
- Love Diary #45, 47 (1966–1967)
- Peter Cannon, Thunderbolt #54–56 (1966–1967)
- Romantic Story #87 (1967)
- Teen-Age Love #54 (1967)

=== Marvel ===
- Amazing Adventures vol. 2 #1–3 (Black Widow) (1970)
- Astonishing Tales #15 (Ka-Zar) (1972)
- Capt. Savage and His Leatherneck Raiders #1–6, 8–12, 17–19 (1968–1970)
- Captain America #142–148 (1971–1972)
- Captain Britain #15–26, 28–36 (Marvel UK) (1977)
- Captain Marvel #13–15, 25 (1969–1973)
- Chamber of Darkness #1 (1969)
- Combat Kelly #1–9 (1972–1973)
- Daredevil #70 (1970)
- Frankenstein #1–11 (1973–1974)
- Ghost Rider #1–7 (1967)
- Ghost Rider vol. 2 #1–4, 6 (1973–1974)
- Gunhawks #1–6 (1972–1973)
- The Incredible Hulk vol. 2 #102–104, 107, 152–153, Annual #1 (1968–1972)
- Iron Man #45–46 (1972)
- Kid Colt Outlaw #133, 138–139, 201, Giant-Size #2–3 (1967–1975)
- Marvel Spotlight #5–11 (Ghost Rider); #12–13 (Son of Satan) (1972–1974)
- Marvel Super-Heroes #16 (Phantom Eagle) (1968)
- Marvel Team-Up #73 (1978)
- Millie the Model #149, 151–153 (1967)
- Modeling with Millie #53–54 (1967)
- Monsters on the Prowl #10 (1971)
- Monsters Unleashed #2, 4–5 (1973–1974)
- My Love #14, 16, 18 (1971–1972)
- Nick Fury, Agent of S.H.I.E.L.D. #9–11, 13–15 (1969)
- Not Brand Echh #1–4, 6, 8–9, 12, 13 (1967–1969)
- Our Love Story #14–17 (1971–1972)
- Outlaw Kid #13–16 (1972–1973)
- Rawhide Kid #58, 60–61, 64, 96, 101 (1967–1972)
- Red Wolf #1, 9 (1972–1973)
- Sgt. Fury and his Howling Commandos #42–57, 59–73, 75–76, 83, 94, 96–98, 100, 102, 104, 106, 108, 110, 112, 115–116, Annual #3–4, 6 (1967–1973)
- Supernatural Thrillers #6 (1973)
- Tower of Shadows #2–3 (1969–1970)
- Two-Gun Kid #86, 89, 91 (1967–1968)
- Western Gunfighters #1–4, 7 (1970–1972)
- What If...? #14 (1979)
- X-Men #44–47 (1968)

=== Skywald Publications ===
- Butch Cassidy #2–3 (1971)
- Hell Rider #1–2 (1971)
- Nightmare #4 (1971)

=== Topps Comics ===
- Bombast #1 (1993)

== Notes ==
Preceded by Stan Lee	The Incredible Hulk vol. 2 writer 1968	Succeeded by Stan Lee
Preceded by Roy Thomas	(Uncanny) X-Men writer 1968	Succeeded by Arnold Drake
Preceded by Stan Lee	Captain America writer 1971–1972	Succeeded by Gerry Conway
Preceded by Gerry Conway	Iron Man writer 1972	Succeeded by Mike Friedrich
