= Combat Kelly and the Deadly Dozen =

1972–73 comic book series

- Cover to issue #7.

Publication information
- Publisher: Marvel Comics
- Schedule: Bi-monthly
- Publication date: 1972
- No. of issues: 9
- Main character(s): Michael Kelly; The Deadly Dozen

Creative team
- Created by: Gary Friedrich; Dick Ayers
- Written by: Gary Friedrich
- Artist: Jim Mooney
- Penciller: Dick Ayers
- Inker(s): Jim Mooney; Mike Esposito; Vincent Joseph Colletta; John Tartaglione
- Letterer(s): Sam Rosen; Jean Izzo; Jean Simek
- Colorist(s): Don Warfield; Other uncredited artists
- Editor(s): Stan Lee; Roy Thomas

Combat Kelly and the Deadly Dozen is a comic book series published by Marvel Comics from 1972 to 1973. The series was created by writer Gary Friedrich and penciler Dick Ayers, the creative team of Marvel's long-running World War II title Sgt. Fury and his Howling Commandos. The premiere issue continued a story that began in Sgt. Fury #98 (May 1972), and occasional crossovers continued between these two series. The series lasted for nine issues and was cover-billed simply as Combat Kelly in the postal indicia. With issue #5 (Feb. 1973), the cover title changed slightly to Combat Kelly and his Deadly Dozen. The series name and premise are similar to those of the 1960s film The Dirty Dozen. The series was the second to feature a character by the name of Combat Kelly.

== Publication history ==
Cover dates

1. "Stop the Luftwaffe, Win the War", July 1972
2. "Lonely Are the Brave", August 1972
3. "The Boston Bomber", October 1972 (origin issue)
4. "To Hell With Heroes", December 1972
5. "Escape From Devil's Island", February 1973
6. "A Wing... a Prayer... and Mad Dog Martin!", April 1973
7. "Blast the Beasts and Children", June 1973
8. "Hospital of Horrors", August 1973
9. "Did You Ever See A Dozen Die?!", October 1973

== Premise ==
The series featured Corporal Kelly as the leader of a team of convicted criminals who serve in the army during the Second World War to pay for their crimes. Kelly is a Boston boxer who, against his better judgment, kills his opponent in the ring. The character of Happy Sam Sawyer, who was Nick Fury's commanding officer in Sgt. Fury, also appears in the series, and the characters from the two series crossed over occasionally. The series featured a racially diverse cast much like its precursor, but unlike the characters in the previous series, the so-called Deadly Dozen was much more morally loose, as the series features them sometimes committing war crimes, such as shooting unarmed non-combatants. The final issue of the series, named "Did You Ever See A Dozen Die?!", ends with virtually every main character dying, something which was unprecedented at the time of its release.

== Reception ==
Michael Aushenker of The Comics Reporter stated in his 2009 review of the final issue that he had never seen a finale like it before and that it was "bad-ass" in his opinion. Aushenker described the issue as brutal and twisted. He added that he believed that it was the most sadistic issue of a comic book ever published with the Comics Code Authority's seal of approval. He also explained that he was shocked that the author and artist got away with it, despite the fact that most of the violence was implied off screen. Aushenker went on to say that he believed that the writer, Gary Friedrich, was more worthy of a medal than the series' main character and namesake, Michael Kelly, for having written it.

== Reprints ==
The first issue was reprinted in 2012 in the collected edition Marvel Firsts: The 1970s, Volume 1.

== See also ==
- Captain Savage and his Leatherneck Raiders, another spin-off of Sgt. Fury
