= Max (comics) =

Imprint of Marvel Comics

MAX Comics
- The logo utilized for Marvel MAX Comics
- Parent company: Marvel Comics
- Founded: 2001
- Defunct: 2024
- Country of origin: United States
- Headquarters location: New York City, New York
- Key people: Joe Quesada; Axel Alonso
- Publication types: Comics

MAX Comics was an imprint of Marvel Comics specializing in comic book media aimed at adult-only readers. It was launched in 2001 after Marvel broke with the Comics Code Authority and established its own rating system.

== History ==
The MAX Comics imprint was not Marvel's first effort to feature explicit content in their titles. The company's Epic Comics imprint in the 1980s and early 1990s often featured stronger content than their mainstream imprint. However, the MAX Comics imprint was the first time Marvel has specifically produced comics with uncensored content.

The first series to be published under the MAX imprint was Alias, written by Brian Michael Bendis. Several limited series were then created specially for the MAX imprint, such as Apache Skies and Haunt of Horror, but the majority of its publications were based around existing Marvel characters, such as Howard the Duck and Devil-Slayer.

One Marvel character who was revived by MAX was Rawhide Kid who in 2002 became the first openly homosexual Marvel comic book character to star in his own magazine. The first edition of the Rawhide Kid's saga was called Slap Leather. According to a CNN.com article, "The new series pairs the original artist, John Severin, now 86, with Ron Zimmerman, a television writer. Making the Rawhide Kid gay was Zimmerman's idea." The character's homosexuality is conveyed indirectly, through euphemisms and puns, and the comic's style is campy. Conservative groups protested the homosexual take on the character, which they claimed would corrupt children, though the covers carried an "Adults only" label.

Since 2012, the new works under the MAX imprint have been limited to the Punisher series. Marvel now portrays MAX as a rating indicating mature content, rather than a separate brand. The latest MAX issue (Get Fury #6) was published in October 2024 (cover date).

== Criticism ==
While some works such as Alias have received acclaim, the imprint has attracted controversy, with some critics considering some of the titles to be gratuitous in their use of mature or vulgar content. Former Marvel president and chairman Stan Lee openly criticized the MAX imprint; referring to an incident of strangulation with intestines in the 2001 Fury miniseries, based on the character Nick Fury, whom he co-created, Lee said, "I don't know why they're doing that. I don't think that I would do those kinds of stories".

== Titles ==
- Alias #1-28 (2001)
- Apache Skies #1-4 (2002)
- Black Widow: Pale Little Spider #1-3 (2002)
- Blade #1-6 (2002)
- Born #1-4 (miniseries, 2003; Punisher MAX origin)
- Cage #1-5 (2002)
- Dead of Night featuring:
  - Man-Thing #1-4 (miniseries, 2008)
  - Devil-Slayer #1-4 (miniseries, 2008)
  - Werewolf by Night #1-4 (miniseries, 2009)
- Deadpool MAX 1-12 (2010)
- Deadpool MAX II 1-6 (2011)
- Deadpool MAX X-Mas Special one-shot (2011)
- The Destroyer #1-5 (miniseries, 2009)
- Doctor Spectrum #1-6 (2004)
- Dominic Fortune #1-4 (2009)
- The Eternal #1-6 (2003)
- Fantomex #1-4 (2013)
- Foolkiller #1-5 (miniseries, 2007)
- Foolkiller: White Angels #1-5 (miniseries, 2008)
- Fury #1-6 (2001)
- Fury MAX #1-13, also known as Fury: My War Gone By (2012)
- Get Fury #1-6 (2024)
- Haunt of Horror:
  - Edgar Allan Poe #1-3 (miniseries, 2006)
  - H. P. Lovecraft #1-3 (miniseries, 2008)
- Hellstorm: Son of Satan #1-5 (2006)
- The Hood #1-6 (2002)
- Howard the Duck #1-6 (miniseries, 2002)
- The Punisher #1-65 (2004); later Punisher: Frank Castle MAX #66-75 (2008)
- Punisher MAX One-shots:
  - Punisher: The End (2004)
  - Punisher: The Cell (2005)
  - Punisher: The Tyger (2006)
  - Punisher MAX Annual (2007)
  - Punisher: Force of Nature (2008)
  - Punisher MAX Special: Little Black Book (2008)
  - Punisher MAX X-Mas Special (2008)
  - Punisher MAX: Naked Kill (2009)
  - Punisher MAX: Get Castle (2009)
  - Punisher MAX: Butterfly (2010)
  - Punisher MAX: Happy Ending (2010)
  - Punisher MAX: Hot Rods of Death (2010)
  - Punisher MAX: Tiny Ugly World (2010)
- PunisherMax #1-22 (2009)
- Punisher MAX: The Platoon #1-6 (2017)
- Punisher: Soviet #1-6 (2019)
- The Punisher Presents: Barracuda MAX #1-5 (2007)
- Rawhide Kid #1-5 (2003)
- Shang-Chi: Master of Kung Fu #1-6 (2002)
- Starr the Slayer #1-4 (2009)
- Strange Tales II #1-3 (2010, only #1 is under the MAX label, #2-3 are Marvel Knights)
- Supreme Power #1-18 (moved to the normal Marvel Comics imprint in 2006 under the name of its predecessor, Squadron Supreme)
- Supreme Power: Hyperion #1-5 (2005)
- Supreme Power: Nighthawk #1-6 (2005)
- Supreme Power vol. 2 #1-4 (2011)
- Terror Inc. #1-5 (miniseries, 2007)
- Terror, Inc. - Apocalypse Soon #1-4 (2009)
- Thor: Vikings #1-5 (miniseries, 2003)
- U.S. War Machine #1-12 (2001)
- U.S. War Machine 2.0 #1-3 (2003)
- Untold Tales of Punisher Max #1-5 (2012)
- War is Hell: The First Flight of the Phantom Eagle #1-5 (2008)
- Wisdom #1-6 (2007)
- Wolverine MAX #1-15 (2012)
- X-Men: Phoenix - Legacy of Fire #2-3 (issue #1 was released under the regular Marvel Comics label with a PG+ rating, 2003)
- Zombie #1-4 (miniseries, 2006)
- The Zombie: Simon Garth #1-4 (miniseries, 2007)

MAX Ant-Man and Deathlok miniseries were both solicited, but were cancelled before their release.

Some of the titles such as Alias, The Hood, Wisdom, Thor: Vikings and Apache Skies are considered part of Earth-616, the main Marvel Universe, while others like Punisher MAX, Wolverine MAX, Fury, Deadpool MAX and Foolkiller take place in alternate universes.

== See also ==
- Marvel Knights, similar Marvel Comics' former mature-readers imprint
- DC Black Label, DC Comics' current mature-readers imprint
- Vertigo, DC Comics' former mature-readers imprint
