= Combat Kelly =

Combat Kelly is the name of two fictional characters appearing in American comic books published by Marvel Comics. Both appear in war comics titles: Combat Kelly, published by Marvel's 1950s iteration, Atlas Comics, and set during the Korean War; and the 1970s series Combat Kelly and the Deadly Dozen, set earlier during World War II.

== Hank Kelly ==
Combat Kelly

Publication information
- Publisher: Marvel Comics
- First appearance: Combat Kelly #1 (November, 1951)

In-story information
- Alter ego: Hank Kelly
- Species: Human

Combat Kelly starred in the 44-issue, Korean War-set Combat Kelly (Nov. 1951 to Aug. 1957), published by Atlas Comics, the 1950s forerunner of Marvel Comics. The character also made two appearances in the Atlas war comics series Battle comics. Kelly is accompanied by his sidekick Cookie Novak; Kelly is of Irish heritage, while Novak is a Polish immigrant. Combat Kelly stories were drawn by artists including Dave Berg, Joe Maneely, and Gene Colan, with at least one cover drawn by Russ Heath.

== Michael Kelly ==
Combat Kelly

Publication information
- Publisher: Marvel Comics
- First appearance: Combat Kelly and the Deadly Dozen #1 (June, 1972)
- Created by: Gary Friedrich, Dick Ayers

In-story information
- Alter ego: Michael Kelly
- Species: Human

Corporal Michael Lee Kelly starred as the leader of group of military convicts paroled for special missions in a nine-issue series cover-billed as Combat Kelly and the Deadly Dozen (June 1972 - Oct. 1973). The series name and premise are similar to those of the 1960s film The Dirty Dozen. With issue #5 (Feb. 1973), the cover title changed slightly to Combat Kelly and his Deadly Dozen. In issue #3, Kelly is described as a U.S. Army boxer who in 1940 killed a man in the ring. He was convicted and sentenced for manslaughter, and was later paroled. In the final issue, almost the entire cast is murdered by Nazis.

== Sources ==
- Christiansen, Jeff. The Appendix to the Handbook of the Marvel Universe: "Deadly Dozen"
