= Phantom Eagle =

Marvel Comics fictional character

Phantom Eagle is the name used by two fictional aviator heroes appearing in American comic books.

The first character to use the name was teenaged Mickey Malone, a young aviator who appeared in the 1940s in Fawcett Comics publications depicting contemporaneous World War II adventures. The second and better-known character, created in the 1960s by Marvel Comics, was Karl Kaufmann, the American son of German parents, who became a masked World War I ace.

== Fawcett Comics ==
Phantom Eagle (Fawcett Comics)
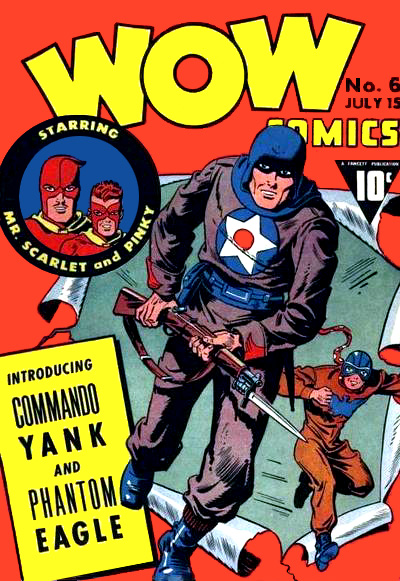
- Wow Comics #6 (July 1942); Phantom Eagle at right, artist unknown.

Publication information
- Publisher: Fawcett Comics
- First appearance: Wow Comics #6 (July 1942)
- Created by: Unknown

In-story information
- Alter ego: Mickey Malone
- Team affiliations: All-Star Squadron; Squadron of Justice
- Abilities: Skilled aviator Good hand to hand combatant

=== Publication history ===
The first Phantom Eagle was introduced by uncredited creators in Fawcett Comics' Wow Comics #6 (cover-dated July 1942), during the period fans and historians call the Golden Age of Comic Books. Following his debut, the Phantom Eagle appeared in every issue of Wow Comics, and by the final issue, #69 (August 1948) was a sidekick to Commando Yank. His primary writer-artist was Marc Swayze.

=== Fictional character biography ===
The Phantom Eagle was teenager Mickey Malone, who, though forbidden by superior officer Sergeant Flog at his military airbase in Great Britain, was determined to fight the World War II Axis powers. Donning an aviator-styled costume and building his own airplane, he takes the name Phantom Eagle and becomes a secret ace.

He later forms the Phoenix Squadron, a group of fellow teen pilots. During the post-war period, Malone formed a charter airline and searched for the Golden Chalice, a lost artifact upon which is inscribed the "Formula for Peace".

== Marvel Comics ==
Phantom Eagle (Marvel Comics)
- Marvel Super-Heroes #16, art by Herb Trimpe.

Publication information
- Publisher: Marvel Comics
- First appearance: Marvel Super-Heroes #16 (September 1968)
- Created by: Gary Friedrich (writer); Herb Trimpe (artist)

In-story information
- Alter ego: Karl Kaufmann
- Team affiliations: Freedom's Five
- Abilities: Ace World War I pilot Good hand to hand combatant

=== Publication history ===
The second Phantom Eagle was an unrelated World War I hero created by writer Gary Friedrich and artist Herb Trimpe in Marvel Super-Heroes #16 (September 1968). As Trimpe described, Marvel production manager John Verpoorten "had been a classmate at SVA. When I got out of the Air Force in October 1966, he worked in the production department at Marvel. He said they were hiring freelance people, and I should come up to the office and show my work to Sol Brodsky, who was Stan [Lee]'s right-hand man at the time. I said, 'Okay'. Later, while I was in the photostat department, I did the Phantom Eagle freelance, the first book I penciled. I think".

Trimpe in 2002 described the character's creation:

[T]he Phantom Eagle was primarily Gary Friedrich's idea. He knew I was interested in airplanes and that kind of stuff, so he came up with this wacko idea that became the Phantom Eagle. However, I could not quite justify this Americanized version of some sort of WWI combat ace. ... There was too much of a superhero in the character. If you know anything of that time in history or the feel of that time, you would know that it was just so wrong. But it was fun and I got to make up some of the airplanes. ... [T]he Phantom Eagle airplanes were all made up, and not patterned after a real airplane, but an original design by me. ... It had a kind of corny design pattern painted on it, like wings and that kind of stuff, which was not that far from what the pilots painted on their planes. But that character was what Roy Rogers and Gene Autry were to the American Western – totally Hollywoodized.

The character made few appearances beyond his debut. The first was a time travel story in The Incredible Hulk (vol. 2) #135 (January 1971). Next came a flashback appearance in Ghost Rider #12 (June 1975), in which the Phantom Eagle, as the cover proclaimed, was a real phantom. The Invaders #7 (July 1976) retconned the character as a member of the Freedom's Five, a newly created World War I team of costumed adventurers never subsequently seen. The Phantom Eagle also appeared for two panels in Thor Corps #3 (November 1993), when the antagonist briefly alters reality.

Ghost Rider #50 (November 1980) contains a page of pinup art by Trimpe that one historian speculates may have been an unused cover of issue #12.

In 2014's All-New Invaders #12, there's a flashback of Freedom's Five.

=== Fictional character biography ===
In 1914, Karl Kaufmann was a skilled American pilot from Oshkosh, Wisconsin, whose German parents had returned to their native country. Kaufmann had become an expert stunt-pilot and co-owner of a flying circus, by 1917, when the United States entered World War I, and desired to fight the Central Powers. Concealing his identity so as not to risk reprisals against his parents, he devised a stylized aviator uniform with darkened goggles and a cape, and joined the European conflict to become an ace on the side of the Allies as a U.S. Army Air Corps test pilot. In his first mission as Phantom Eagle, he successfully led a U.S. fighter squadron against an experimental dirigible aircraft carrier with which German forces attempted to invade New York; however, he witnessed the death of his best friend, Rex Griffin, as a result. At one point the time-traveling dictator Kang the Conqueror sent the simpleminded brute the Hulk back to 1917 in an effort to secure a victory for Germany, by preventing the Phantom Eagle from destroying a key German super-weapon. Another time, a brief altering of reality saw the Phantom Eagle's biplane pursued by modern jet fighters.

The Phantom Eagle went on to join the team of costumed adventurers known as Freedom's Five, consisting of himself (the sole American), the Crimson Cavalier, the Silver Squire, Sir Steel, and Union Jack.

Kaufmann and his parents were later killed together near the end of the war by German pilot Hermann von Reitberger, who strafed both the Phantom Eagle and the two civilians with his machine guns as they fled from Germany into Alsace, France. Swearing vengeance, the Phantom Eagle's spirit haunted and hunted von Reitberger through the years until, after a chance, modern-day encounter with the original Ghost Rider, he battled the aged German in aerial combat. With von Reitberger's death, Kaufmann's vengeful spirit was allowed to pass on.

Sometime later, the ghost of the Phantom Eagle's plane assisted Doctor Strange and the Punisher. They were trying to stop a collection of mystically powered mobsters.

=== Powers and abilities ===
The Phantom Eagle was a normal man with no superhuman powers. He possessed good hand-to-hand fighting skills, and was an expert stunt-flyer and combat pilot. He customized his own World War I vintage biplane.

=== Other versions ===
==== Counter-Earth Phantom Eagle ====
Another Phantom Eagle exists on Counter-Earth, located on the far side of the sun. He is the counterpart of Nefarius, the Lloyd Bloch of the main Marvel Universe.

==== MAX ====
Writer Garth Ennis and penciller-inker Howard Chaykin produced an alternate-reality version of the character in a World War I-set miniseries, War is Hell: The First Flight of the Phantom Eagle #1–5 (May–September 2008), published under Marvel's mature-audience MAX imprint. The series is set in the same continuity (Earth-200111) as Ennis' The Punisher and Fury MAX series.

This version of the Phantom Eagle reappears in a tie-in to Marvel's 2015 Secret Wars event, starring in Where Monsters Dwell, a miniseries by Garth Ennis and Russell Braun.
