= Dick Ayers =

American cartoonist

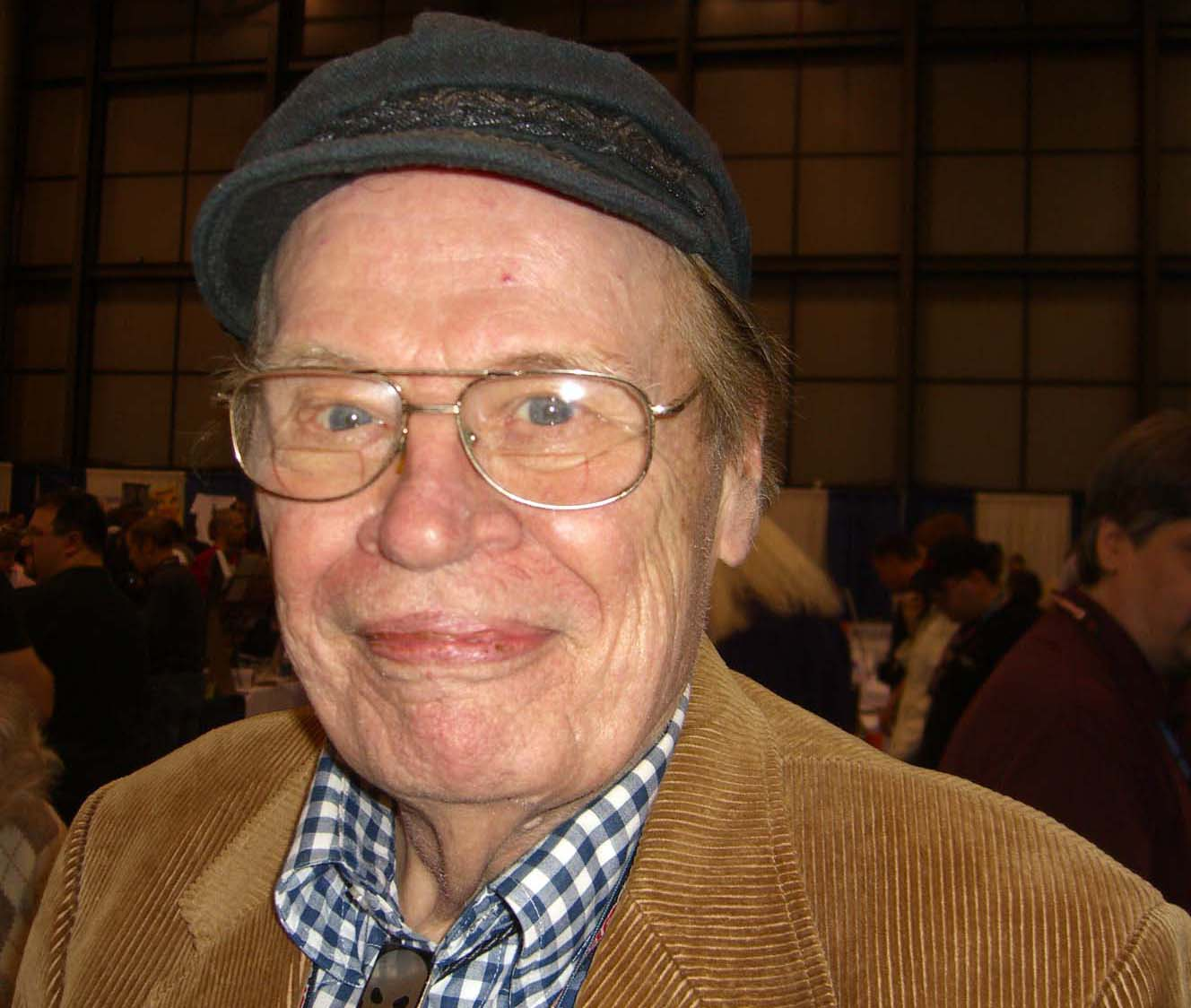
- Dick Ayers at the April 2008 New York Comic Con
- Born: Richard Bache Ayers; April 28, 1924 Ossining, New York, U.S.
- Died: May 4, 2014 (aged 90) White Plains, New York, U.S.
- Areas: Penciller, Inker
- Notable works: Sgt. Fury and his Howling Commandos; 1950s Ghost Rider; Jack Kirby inker
- Awards: National Cartoonists Society Award (1985); Inkpot Award (1997); Will Eisner Comic Book Hall of Fame (2007); Inkwell Awards Joe Sinnott Hall of Fame (2013)

Richard Bache Ayers (/ɛərz/; April 28, 1924 – May 4, 2014) was an American comic book artist and cartoonist best known for his work as one of Jack Kirby's inkers during the late-1950s and 1960s period known as the Silver Age of Comics, including on some of the earliest issues of Marvel Comics' The Fantastic Four. He is the signature penciler of Marvel's World War II comic Sgt. Fury and his Howling Commandos, drawing it for a 10-year run, and he co-created Magazine Enterprises' 1950s Western-horror character the Ghost Rider, a version of which he would draw for Marvel in the 1960s.

Ayers was inducted into the Will Eisner Comic Book Hall of Fame in 2007.

== Early life ==
Richard Bache Ayers was born April 28, 1924, in Ossining, New York, the son of John Bache Ayers and Gladys Minnerly Ayers. He had a sister who was 10 years older. The siblings were in the 13th generation, he said, of the Ayers family that had settled in Newbury, Massachusetts in 1635. At 18, during World War II, he enlisted in the United States Army Air Corps, and was stationed in Florida, where after failing radar training he was sent for a month's art training at McTomb University and began working as an artist in the Air Corps' Operations division. He published his first comic strip, Radio Ray, in the military newspaper Radio Post in 1942.

== Career ==
Ayers entered the comics industry with unpublished work done for Western Publishing's Dell Comics imprint. "I approached them," Ayers said in a 1996 interview. "I had a story written and drawn. They wanted to wrap a book around it.... I got into it, but Dell decided to scrap the project. ... It was an adventure thing, boy and girl; the boy wanted to be a trumpet player. The girl kept feeding the jukebox and he'd played along to Harry James or whatever sort of thing. ... It didn't make it, but it got me started where I wanted to be in the business."

=== Magazine Enterprises ===
Following this, in 1947, Ayers studied under Burne Hogarth in the first class of Hogarth's new institution, New York City's Cartoonists and Illustrators School (renamed the School of Visual Arts in 1956). Joe Shuster, co-creator of Superman, would visit the class, and Ayers eventually ventured to his nearby studio. "Next thing I knew," Ayers said in the same interview, "I was penciling a bit here and there." In a 2005 interview, Ayers elaborated that, "Joe had me pencil some of his Funnyman stories after seeing my drawings at Hogarth's evening class" and "sent me to [editor] Vin Sullivan of Magazine Enterprises." There, Sullivan "let me try the Jimmy Durante [humor] strip. I submitted my work and got the job."

Ayers went on to pencil and ink Western stories in the late 1940s for Magazine Enterprises' A-1 Comics and Trail Colt, and for Prize Comics' Prize Comics Western. With writer Ray Krank, Ayers created the horror-themed Western character Ghost Rider in Tim Holt #11 (1949). The character appeared in stories through the run of Tim Holt, Red Mask, A-1 Comics, Bobby Benson's B-Bar-B Riders, and the 14-issue solo series The Ghost Rider (1950–1954), up through the introduction of the Comics Code Authority. The character's genesis came, Ayers recalled in 2003, when Sullivan "describe[d] what he wanted in the Ghost Rider" and told Ayers to see the 1949 Disney animated feature The Adventures of Ichabod and Mr. Toad, one segment of which adapted Washington Irving's story "The Legend of Sleepy Hollow", featuring the Headless Horseman. "[A]nd then he told me to play the Vaughn Monroe record "(Ghost) Riders in the Sky". And then he started talking about what he wanted the guy wearing."

After the trademark to the character's name and motif lapsed, Marvel Comics debuted its own near-identical, non-horror version of the character in Ghost Rider #1 (Feb. 1967), by writers Roy Thomas and Gary Friedrich and original Ghost Rider artist Ayers.

Ayers' hands appear onscreen as those of a cartoonist played by actor Don Briggs in "The Comic Strip Murders", a 1949 episode of the CBS television series Suspense.

=== Atlas Comics ===
In 1952, while continuing to freelance for Magazine Enterprises, Ayers began a long freelance run at Atlas Comics, the 1950s forerunner of Marvel Comics. He drew horror stories in such titles as Adventures into Terror, Astonishing, Journey into Mystery, Journey into Unknown Worlds, Menace, Mystery Tales, Mystic, Strange Tales, and Uncanny Tales. As well, he drew the brief revival of the 1940s Golden Age of Comics superhero the Human Torch, from Marvel's 1940s predecessor Timely Comics, in Young Men # 21–24 (June 1953 – Feb. 1954). An additional, unpublished Human Torch story drawn by Ayers belatedly appeared in Marvel Super-Heroes #16 (Sept. 1968).

During the 1950s, Ayers also drew freelance for Charlton Comics, including for the horror comic The Thing and the satirical series Eh!.

=== Marvel Comics ===
The 1960s Marvel Comics version of Ayer's co-creation, the Western Ghost Rider: Ghost Rider #1 (Feb. 1967). Cover art by Ayers

Ayers first teamed with the highly influential and historically important artist Jack Kirby at Atlas shortly before Atlas transitioned to become Marvel Comics. As Kirby's second regular Marvel inker, following Christopher Rule, Ayers would ink countless covers and stories, including on such landmark comics as most early issues of The Fantastic Four, in addition to a slew of Western and "pre-superhero Marvel" monster stories in Amazing Adventures, Journey into Mystery, Strange Tales, Tales of Suspense, and Tales to Astonish. Because creator credits were not routinely given at the time, two standard databases disagree over the duo's first published collaboration. Ayers revealed in 1996, however:

The first work I did with Jack was the cover of Wyatt Earp #25 (Oct. 1959). [Editor-in-chief] Stan Lee liked it and sent me another job, "The Martian Who Stole My Body," for Journey into Mystery #57 (Dec. 1959). I also began Sky Masters, the [syndicated] newspaper strip. There is a lot of confusion on this; people think Wally Wood inked them all, because they're signed Kirby/Wood. But that was Dave Wood, the writer [who was unrelated to artist Wally Wood]. I began Sky Masters with the 36th Sunday page; Jack's pencils, my inks, in September 1959. I ended the Sundays in January 1960. I also did the dailies for a period of [over] two years, from September of '59 to December of '61. These were complete inks; I was the only one doing it at the time. Of course, Wally Wood also worked on that strip, in the beginning, before me.

Sgt. Fury and his Howling Commandos #57 (Aug. 1968). Cover art by penciler Ayers and inker John Severin.

Ayers went on to ink scores of Kirby Western and monster stories, including such much-reprinted tales as "I Created the Colossus!" (Tales of Suspense #14, Feb. 1961), "Goom! The Thing from Planet X!" (Tales of Suspense #15, March 1961), and "Fin Fang Foom!" (Strange Tales #89, Oct. 1961). As Marvel introduced its superheroes in the early 1960s, Ayers inked Kirby on the first appearances of Ant-Man (Tales to Astonish #27 & 35, Jan. & Sept. 1962), Sgt. Fury and his Howling Commandos (issues #1-3, May-Sept. 1963), and the revamped Rawhide Kid (beginning with The Rawhide Kid #17, Aug. 1960); on the second and several subsequent early appearances of Thor (Journey into Mystery #84-89, Sept. 1962 - Feb. 1963); on Fantastic Four #6-20 (Sept. 1962 - Nov. 1963), and the spin-off Human Torch solo series in Strange Tales (starting with its debut in issue #101); and The Incredible Hulk #3-5 (Sept. 1962 - Jan. 1963), among other series.

Additionally, Ayers took over from Kirby as Sgt. Fury penciler with issue #8 (July 1964), beginning a 10-year run that — except for #13 (which he inked over Kirby's pencils), and five issues by other pencilers — continued virtually unbroken through #120 (with the series running Ayers reprints every-other-issue through most but not all from #79 on). Sgt. Fury #27 (Feb. 1966) featured a story which explained why the titular character wore an eye patch in his present-day stories. Writer Gary Friedrich's story for issue #72 (Nov. 1969) was heavily rewritten and partially redrawn due to concerns about possible copyright infringement of the film Casablanca.

Ayers and Friedrich collaborated on the Captain Savage and his Leatherneck Raiders series for Marvel as well.

Ayers drew a comics adaptation of Killdozer, a made for TV science-fiction horror film, in Worlds Unknown #6 (April 1974). The film itself was adapted from a 1944 novella of the same name by Theodore Sturgeon.

=== DC Comics ===
In 1976, Ayers began working for DC Comics. He and writer Bob Haney oversaw the renaming of Star Spangled War Stories to a self-titled series for the Unknown Soldier. Michael Fleisher and Ayers launched Scalphunter, a new lead feature for Weird Western Tales as of issue #39 (March–April 1977). Other series which Ayers drew included Jonah Hex, Kamandi, and the "Gravedigger" feature in Men of War.

Gerry Conway and Ayers created a series called The Deserter in 1978 but the project was never published due to DC cutting back its publishing output.

=== Later career ===
In the 1980s, Ayers, inked by Chic Stone, drew four editions of the promotional, annual comic-book series initially cover-titled TRS-80 Computer Whiz Kids and, thereafter, Tandy Computer Whiz Kids, published by Archie Comics for Radio Shack: The Computer Trap (March 1984), The Computers That Said No to Drugs (March 1985), The Answer to a Riddle (March 1987), and Fit to Win (March 1988). He also drew approximately 30 sports-star biographies for Revolutionary Comics between 1990 and 1994.

Ayers' work continued into the 2000s. He contributed a pinup page to the 2001 comic The Song of Mykal, published privately by the comics shop Atlantis Fantasyworld, did inking on "Doris Danger" stories in the magazine Tabloia #572-576, and drew a pinup page in the comic Doris Danger's Greatest All-Out Army Battles!

He wrote and drew the eight-page "Chips Wilde" Western story in the benefit comic Actor Comics Presents #1 (Fall 2006), provided a sketch for the benefit comic The 3-Minute Sketchbook (2007), and contributed to the tribute comic The Uncanny Dave Cockrum (2007). In 2009, he drew a half-page biographical illustration of a 1940s character in the reference guide Marvel Mystery Handbook 70th Anniversary Special. Two Kamandi stories written by Jack C. Harris and drawn by Ayers and Danny Bulanadi in 1978, which went unreleased due to the title's cancellation, were published in 2017 as part of Kamandi Challenge Special #1.

=== Illustrated autobiography ===
Starting in 2005, Ayers "published an ambitious and unusual three-volume graphic memoir," The Dick Ayers Story: an Illustrated Autobiography, through Mecca Comics. Each volume of this autobiography is approximately 120 pages, with volume one covering his life from 1924–1951, volume two from 1951–1986, and volume three 1986–2005. Ayers wrote, drew, and lettered all three volumes.

== Personal life ==
Ayers married Charlotte Lindy Walter on April 7, 1951. The couple had four children: sons Richard, Fred, and Steve, and daughter, Elaine. Ayers died at his home in White Plains, New York on May 4, 2014, six days after his 90th birthday.

== Awards and honors ==
- 1967 Alley Award for Best War Title for Sgt. Fury and his Howling Commandos
- 1968 Alley Award for Best War Title for Sgt. Fury and his Howling Commandos
- 1985 National Cartoonists Society Award for Best Comic Book
- 1997 Inkpot Award
- 2007 inductee, Will Eisner Comic Book Hall of Fame
- 2013 Inkwell Awards Joe Sinnott Hall of Fame

== Bibliography ==
=== AC Comics ===
- Femforce #36, 39, 45, 48–54, 58–60, 63, 69–71, 73–74, 102–103 (1991–1997)
- She-Cat #5A (1995)

=== Archie Comics ===
- Archie Giant Series Magazine #554 (1985)
- Blue Ribbon Comics #7, 11 (1984)
- The Fly #9 (1959)
- The Fly vol. 2 (1984)
- Mantech Robot Warriors #1–4 (1984–1985)
- Mighty Crusaders vol. 2 #3–6, 8–10, 12–13 (1983–1985)
- The Original Shield #1–4 (1984)
- Steel Sterling #7 (1984)
- Tandy Computer Whiz Kids ("Fit to Win") #5 (1988)
- Tandy Computer Whiz Kids ("The Answer to a Riddle Edition") #4 (1987)
- Tandy Computer Whiz Kids ("The Computer That Said No to Drugs Edition") #2 (1985)
- TRS-80 Computer Whiz Kids #1 (1984)

=== Charlton Comics ===
- Crime and Justice #17 (1953)
- Eh #1–3, 5–7 (1954–1954)
- Sick #110 (1976)
- Strange Suspense Stories #17 (1954)
- The Thing! #12, 16–17 (1954)
- This Magazine Is Haunted #20 (1954)

=== DC Comics ===
- All-Out War #1–6 (1979–1980)
- Army at War #1 (1978)
- Cancelled Comic Cavalcade #1–2 (1978)
- DC Special Series #16, 21 (full art); #9 (inks over Jose Delbo, Steve Ditko and Russ Heath) (1978–1980)
- DC Super Stars #14 (Doctor Light) (1977)
- Elvira's House of Mystery #5 (1986)
- Freedom Fighters #7–15 (1977–1978)
- Ghosts #75, 84, 97–98, 109 (1979–1982)
- G.I. Combat #201, 204–206, 226–227, 230–243, 247–248, 250, 253, 256–257, 274, 278 (full art); #223–229 (inks over Sam Glanzman); #260 (inks over Pat Broderick) (1977–1985)
- House of Mystery #280, 291 (1980–1981)
- Jonah Hex #23, 25, 35–37, 40–41, 44–52, 56, 58–82 (1979–1984)
- Justice League Quarterly #16 (General Glory) (inks over Rick Stasi) (1994)
- Kamandi #48–59 (1977–1978)
- Men of War #4–26 (Gravedigger) (1978–1980)
- Secret Society of Super Villains #10 (1977)
- Secrets of Haunted House #42, 44 (1981–1982)
- Sgt. Rock #317, 323, 340, 342, 348, 411, 417, 421 (1978–1988)
- Star Spangled War Stories #204 (1977)
- Time Warp #5 (1980)
- The Unexpected #198, 214–216, 218, 221 (1980–1982)
- Unknown Soldier #205–210, 212–268 (1977–1982)
- Weird War Tales #50, 57, 70, 78, 91, 94 (1977–1980)
- Weird Western Tales #39–70 (Scalphunter) (1977–1980)
- The Witching Hour #76, 79–80 (1978)

=== Harvey Comics ===
- Alarming Adventures #1 (1962)

=== Magazine Enterprises ===
- Best of the West #5, 12 (1952–1954)
- Ghost Rider #13 (1953)
- Red Mask #42–43, 47–48 (1954–1955)
- Tim Holt #33–37 (1953)

=== Marvel Comics ===
- Adventure into Mystery #6 (1957)
- Adventures into Terror #9, 12, 14, 21, 31 (1952–1954)
- Adventures into Weird Worlds #5, 8, 26 (1952–1954)
- Amazing Adventures #1–6 (inks over Jack Kirby) (1961)
- Annie Oakley #10 (1956)
- Astonishing #14, 16, 18, 21, 23, 37, 40–41, 49, 55, 57, 59 (1952–1956)
- Astonishing Tales #21–24 (It! The Living Colossus) (1973–1974)
- The Avengers #1, 8–9, 16 (inks over Jack Kirby); #10, 12–13, 17–19, 24–25 (inks over Don Heck) (1963–1966)
- Battle #16, 18, 20, 36–37, 39–40, 44, 47, 56–57, 62–63 (1953–1959)
- Battle Action #14–18, 23 (1954–1956)
- Battlefield #10 (1953)
- Battlefront #17–19, 25, 27–28, 30, 32, 35, 39, 42, 44 (1954–1957)
- Battleground #3–4, 6, 13, 15–16 (1955–1957)
- Black Rider #27 (inks over Syd Shores) (1955)
- Captain America #128–134 (inks over Gene Colan) (1970–1971)
- Captain America Comics #77–78 (1954)
- Captain Marvel #11–12 (1969)
- Captain Savage and his Leatherneck Raiders #1–11, 17–19 (1968–1970)
- Chamber of Darkness #6 (1970)
- Combat Casey #18, 32 (1954–1957)
- Combat Kelly #20 (1954)
- Combat Kelly and the Deadly Dozen #1–9 (1972–1973)
- Cowboy Action #8–10 (1955–1956)
- Crazy #5 (1954)
- Daredevil #21–22, 28 (inks over Gene Colan) (1966–1967)
- Dracula Lives! #4 (1974)
- Fantastic Four #154 (full art); #6–12, 14–20, Annual #1 (inks over Jack Kirby) (1962–1975)
- Frontier Western #1, 6, 8 (1956–19570)
- Ghost Rider #1–7 (1967)
- Giant-Size Kid Colt #2–3 (1975)
- G.I. Tales #5 (1957)
- Gunhawks #3, 6–7 (1973)
- Gunsmoke Western #38–40, 44–60, 66–69, 72, 74–76 (full art); #59–60–62 (inks over Jack Keller); #59, 61–67, 69–71, 73 (inks over Jack Kirby) (1956–1973)
- Human Torch #36–38 (1954)
- The Incredible Hulk #3–5 (inks over Jack Kirby) (1962–1963)
- The Incredible Hulk vol. 2 #143–144, 152–153 (1971–1972)
- Iron Man #74 (inks over Arvell Jones and Keith Pollard) (1974)
- Journey into Mystery #1, 14, 25, 27, 39 (full art); #57–62, 64–73, 75–81 (inks over Jack Kirby) (science fiction and horror short stories); #84–89, 93 (Thor stories) (inks over Jack Kirby) (1952–1963)
- Journey into Unknown Worlds #10–11, 24, 40–41, 43, 52 (1952–1956)
- Jungle Tales #5 (1955)
- Justice #50 (1954)
- Ka-Zar #1 (Hercules backup story) (inks over Frank Springer); #2–3 (Angel backup stories) (inks over George Tuska) (1970–1971)
- Kid Colt, Outlaw #33, 51, 62, 80, 101–102, 106–107, 109, 122, 136–137, 201 (full art); #93–96 (inks over Jack Keller); #93, 95–96 (inks over Jack Kirby) (1954–1967, 1975)
- Marines in Action #2 (1955)
- Marines in Battle #1, 4–5, 7, 10, 20–21 (1954–1958)
- Marvel Heroes & Legends 1997 #1 (1997)
- Marvel Super-Heroes #16 (1968)
- Marvel Tales #115, 132, 134–136, 139, 141–142, 145 (1953–1956)
- Marvel Tales vol. 2 #30 (Angel backup story) (inks over George Tuska) (1971)
- Masters of the Universe #9 (1987)
- Matt Slade, Gunfighter #3 (1956)
- Men in Action #9 (1952)
- Men's Adventures #20, 26–28 (1953–1954)
- Mighty Marvel Western #4 (1969)
- My Love #6–7 (inks over John Buscema); #8–9 (inks over Gene Colan) (1970–1971)
- Mystery Tales #2, 12, 15, 18, 25–27, 30, 49, 52 (1952–1957)
- Mystic #8, 13, 21, 35, 38, 41, 45, 47, 53 (1952–1956)
- Mystical Tales #4–6 (1956–1957)
- Navy Action #4, 6, 15 (1955–1956)
- Navy Combat #2, 15 (1955)
- Navy Tales #1, 3 (1957)
- Original Ghost Rider #3–13, 15–20 (1992–1994)
- Our Love Story #6, 9 (inks over John Buscema); #7–8 (inks over Gene Colan) (1970–1971)
- Outlaw Fighters #4 (1955)
- Outlaw Kid #12, 14, 17 (1956–1957)
- Outlaw Kid vol. 2 #10–16 (1972–1973)
- Police Action #4–5 (1954)
- Quick Trigger Western #15, 17 (1956–1957)
- Rawhide Kid #6–16, 24–26, 29, 36–40, 59–61, 91, 96, 101 (full art); #17–32, 34 (inks over Jack Kirby) (1956–1972)
- Red Wolf #9 (1973)
- Ringo Kid #5, 14 (1955–1956)
- Rugged Action #2–4 (1955)
- Savage Tales vol. 2 #3 (1986)
- Secret Story Romances #3 (1954)
- Sergeant Barney Barker #2 (1956)
- Sgt. Fury and his Howling Commandos #1–3 (inks over Jack Kirby); #8–12, 14–43, 47–79, 81, 83–84, 86, 88, 90, 94, 96–98, 100, 102, 104, 106, 108, 110, 112, 114–120, Annual #1–4, 6 (penciller) (1963–1974)
- Six-Gun Western #2–3 (1957)
- Spellbound #1, 4, 7–8, 18, 21, 25–26 (1952–1956)
- Strange Stories of Suspense #5, 9, 14 (1955–1957)
- Strange Stories of the Unusual #7 (1956)
- Strange Tales #10, 30, 35, 37–38, 41, 46, 48, 74–79, 81–87, 89–90, 92–100 (science fiction and horror short stories); #101–129, 131 (Human Torch stories); #135, 147 (Nick Fury, Agent of S.H.I.E.L.D. stories) (1952–1966)
- Strange Tales of the Unusual #3, 6 (1956)
- Strange Worlds #2 (1959)
- Suspense #17, 20 (1952)
- Sub-Mariner #33–35 (1954)
- Tales of Suspense #6 (full art); #8–24, 26–34 (inks over Jack Kirby); #54 (inks over Larry Lieber) (science fiction and horror short stories); #41 (inks over Jack Kirby); #48 (inks over Steve Ditko); #58, 60–63 (inks over Don Heck) (Iron Man stories); #75 (full art); #69, 83 (inks over Jack Kirby) (Captain America stories) (1959–1966)
- Tales to Astonish #7, 29 (full art); 10–11, 13–26, 28–34 (inks over Jack Kirby) (science fiction and horror short stories); #27, 35–39, 51 (inks over Jack Kirby); #62 (inks over Carl Burgos); #52–53, 55–60 (penciller) (Ant Man / Giant Man stories); #65 (inks over Steve Ditko) (Hulk stories); #80–84 (inks over Gene Colan and Jack Kirby) (Namor stories) (1960–1966)
- Two-Gun Kid #13, 17, 24, 26–27, 35, 46, 48, 61, 63–85 (full art); #54–55, 57–62 (inks over Jack Kirby); #104 (inks over Ogden Whitney) (1954–1967, 1972)
- Two Gun Western #11 (1951)
- Two Gun Western vol. 2 #7, 9 (1956–1957)
- Uncanny Tales #1, 14, 22, 26, 28, 30, 37, 40–41, 44 (1952–1956)
- War Adventures #10 (1952)
- War Comics #17, 24, 28–30, 32–35, 38, 42, 44–45 (1952–1957)
- War Is Hell #9–10 (1974)
- Western Gunfighters #26 (1957)
- Western Gunfighters vol. 2 #1–7 (full art); #5 (inks over Werner Roth) (1970–1971)
- Western Kid #6–7 (1955)
- Western Outlaws #1, 7, 10, 12, 14, 17–18, 20 (1954–1957)
- Western Tales of Black Rider #28, 30 (inks over Syd Shores) (1955)
- Wild #4 (1954)
- Wild Western #33, 41–44, 48, 53–54 (1954–1957)
- World of Fantasy #1, 3, 7 (1956–1957)
- World of Mystery #4–5 (1956–1957)
- Worlds Unknown #6 (Killdozer adaptation) (1974)
- Wyatt Earp #8, 10–29 (1957–1960)
- X-Men #15–27 (inks over Werner Roth) (1965–1966)
- Young Men #21–23, 25, 27–28 (1953–1954)

=== Mecca Comics Group ===
- The Dick Ayers Story: An Illustrated Autobiography Vol. 1, 2, 3 (2005)

=== Prize Comics ===
- Black Magic #42–43, 45–48, 50 (1960–1961)

=== Skywald Publications ===
- Blazing Six Guns #1–2 (1970–1971)
- Nightmare #4 (1971)
- Sundance Kid #1–3 (1971)

=== Tower Comics ===
- Dynamo #2 (1966)
- T.H.U.N.D.E.R. Agents #2 (1966)

Preceded by Jack Kirby	Sgt. Fury and his Howling Commandos penciller 1964–1974	Succeeded by n/a
Preceded by Keith Giffen	Kamandi penciller 1977–1978	Succeeded by n/a
Preceded by Gerry Talaoc	Unknown Soldier penciller 1977–1982	Succeeded by n/a
Preceded by Vicente Alcazar	Jonah Hex penciller 1979–1984	Succeeded by Tony DeZuniga
