= Apache Skies =

- Cover of Apache Skies 1 (September 2002), art by Leonardo Manco

Publication information
- Publisher: MAX (Marvel Comics)
- Schedule: Monthly
- Format: Limited series
- Genre: Western
- Publication date: September – December 2002
- No. of issues: 4
- Main character(s): Apache Kid; Rawhide Kid

Creative team
- Written by: John Ostrander
- Artist(s): Leonardo Manco
- Letterer(s): Paul Tutrone
- Colorist(s): Leonardo Manco
- Editor(s): Tom Brevoort

Collected editions
- Apache Skies: ISBN 0-7851-1086-0

Apache Skies is a four-issue comic book limited series, published in 2002 by Marvel Comics as a part of that company's MAX imprint. The series was written by John Ostrander and drawn by Leonardo Manco.

The series was a sequel to 2000s Blaze of Glory.

== Plot summary ==
After the death of the Apache Kid, the Rawhide Kid joins forces with the new Apache Kid to find the killer.

== Collected editions ==
It was published in a collected trade paperback as Apache Skies (ISBN 0-7851-1086-0) in 2002.
