= Blaze of Glory: The Last Ride of the Western Heroes =

- Cover of Blaze of Glory 1 (February 2000), art by Leonardo Manco

Publication information
- Publisher: Marvel Comics
- Schedule: Bi-Weekly
- Format: Limited series
- Genre: Western
- Publication date: February – March 2000
- No. of issues: 4
- Main character(s): Two-Gun Kid; Rawhide Kid; Kid Colt; Outlaw Kid; Reno Jones; Red Wolf; Caleb Hammer; Gunhawk

Creative team
- Created by: John Ostrander; Leonardo Manco
- Written by: John Ostrander
- Artist: Leonardo Manco
- Letterer: Bullpen/DS
- Colorist: Mariana Manco
- Editor(s): Mark Bernardo; Tom Brevoort

Collected editions
- Blaze of Glory: ISBN 0-7851-0906-4

Blaze of Glory: The Last Ride of the Western Heroes is a four-issue comic book limited series published in 2000 by Marvel Comics. It was written by John Ostrander and drawn by Leonardo Manco.

The series featured a more historically realistic update of Marvel's Western heroes. In contrast to the characters' standard looks until then, Blaze of Glory depicted them as grizzled, weather-beaten cowboys and gunfighters, wearing less stylized, more historically appropriate outfits than their classic ones. Blaze of Glory retconned some of the Marvel Western stories of years past as being dime novel fictions of the characters' actual lives.

Series' writer John Ostrander declared:

A lot of the stories that have been printed, like in old issues of Rawhide Kid and Two-Gun Kid, those are great legends, but not necessarily the truth. We're gonna tell you more of the truth. It is going to have a bit of a historical grounding to it. Look for reinterpretations of classic Marvel characters.

== Publication history ==
Blaze of Glory was originally intended to be released as two forty-eight page issues, as writer John Ostrander revealed in a 1998 interview:

It's called Blaze of Glory, sometimes also referred to as the "Last Ride of the Marvel Western Heroes"! There'll be two 48-page books.

Sometime between the date of this interview and the date of publication, the decision to split the two issues into four regular sized issues was made. Issues #1 and #2 were dated February 2000, while issues #3 and #4 were dated March 2000.

The series was collected in 2002 and later that year, a sequel to the Rawhide Kid's arc was released, Apache Skies, also by Ostrander and Manco.

== Plot synopsis ==
=== Issue #1 ===
The peace in Wonderment, Montana (a town founded by a group of ex-slaves freed after the American Civil War, the type of group historically known as Exodusters) is broken when a group of riders dressed like Ku Klux Klan nightriders attack. Among the townsfolk who fight back is Reno Jones, a man whose adventures have been depicted in more than a few dime novels.

The raids continue for days and the town makes a decision to hire gunfighters to protect them. A local Indian tribe agrees to ask a warrior they know to help. Reno Jones then sets off with a man named Marcel Fournier to contact others for help.

Jones locates the Rawhide Kid who is performing as a part of Buffalo Bill's Wild West show. Jones recruits both the Rawhide Kid and Kid Colt and the three of them leave together. Not long after this, a bounty hunter going by the name Gunhawk arrives and asks about the location of Kid Colt. Gunhawk is told where the three riders are going and rides after them.

=== Issue #2 ===
In Anaconda, Montana, Marcel Fournier talks to the Two-Gun Kid. After this conversation, the Two-Gun Kid talks to a Mr. Riley, a man who was once the masked outlaw known as the Tarantula. Their conversation reveals Riley to be the man behind the attacks. He wants the land on which Wonderment sits for a smelting plant he plans to build. This conversation also makes it clear that there is no legal avenue to save Wonderment. Later that night in the hills above Wonderment, Red Wolf agrees to give his aid.

Two days later, Reno Jones recruits the Outlaw Kid. As Jones' small group is about to leave for Wonderment, they are confronted by three Pinkerton detectives, one of whom is Caleb Hammer. They are after Kid Colt. After a short confrontation, Colt shoots all three men. Jones and his allies then ride fast out of town. As the group relaxes around their campfire that night, they are joined by the Two-Gun Kid. He tells them that two of the three Pinkertons were killed, but that Caleb Hammer survived.

Seeking to get into Wonderment by a lesser-known back entrance, the group falls into an ambush. They all make it through except Jones, who falls into a deep ravine after being shot.

=== Issue #3 ===
The small group rides into Wonderment while it is in the middle of another attack. After fighting off the nightriders, they introduce themselves. The next morning, both Hammer and Gunhawk attempt to pass into Wonderment and are stopped by the nightriders. As they are being questioned the, Ghost Rider appears. In the chaos, Hammer and Gunhawk escape and make their way to Wonderment.

=== Issue #4 ===
Caleb Hammer and Gunhawk arrive in Wonderment. After a brief argument, they agree to help and to collect the bounty on Kid Colt's head after the Nightriders are dealt with. At the same time, Fournier is revealed to be a spy for the Nightriders. He is killed by the Two-Gun Kid.

With their eyes in town now lost to them, the Nightriders attack en masse, intending to kill everyone in town. Riley joins in, his hatred for the Ghost Rider (who was his main nemesis when he was the Tarantula) overriding his sense of preservation. In the battle, Reno Jones is revealed to be the man dressed as the Ghost Rider, Jones' ex-partner Kid Cassidy is revealed as the leader of the Nightriders and the Outlaw Kid, Gunhawk, Kid Colt, and the Two-Gun Kid are killed. Riley is shot dead and Cassidy dies in battle with Jones. The battle ends when Red Wolf leads a mass of Indian warriors into Wonderment.

The final issue ends with the Rawhide Kid and Caleb Hammer riding out of town together.

== Collected editions ==
Blaze of Glory was collected in 2002 as a trade paperback, Blaze of Glory: The Last Ride (ISBN 0-7851-0906-4).
