= Phantom Rider =

Comic book superhero

- The Western Ghost Rider #1 (February 1967). Art by Dick Ayers.

Publication information
- Publisher: Marvel Comics
- First appearance: Ghost Rider #1 (February 1967)
- Created by: Dick Ayers; Gary Friedrich; Roy Thomas

In-story information
- Alter ego: Carter Slade; Jamie Jacobs; Lincoln Slade; Reno Jones; Hamilton Slade; J. T. Slade; Jaime Slade
- Species: Human; Ghost
- Team affiliations: Hydra
- Partnerships: Kid Cassidy; Nick Fury; Crossfire
- Notable aliases: Galloping Ghost; Ghost Rider; Haunted Horseman; He Who Rides the Night Winds; Night Rider
- Abilities: Excellent horsemanship and sharpshooting skills Costume provides phosphorescent glowing effect

Phantom Rider is the name of several Old West heroic gunfighter characters appearing in American comic books published by Marvel Comics. The character was originally called Ghost Rider, and was renamed following the introduction of Marvel's motorcycle-riding character of the same name.

The character has made minor appearances across media. He made his live-action debut in the 2007 film Ghost Rider, portrayed by Sam Elliott.

== Publication history ==
Marvel Comics' first Ghost Rider look was based on the Magazine Enterprises character Ghost Rider (Rex Fury), created by writer Ray Krank and artist Dick Ayers for editor Vincent Sullivan in Tim Holt #11 (1949). The character appeared in horror-themed Western stories through the run of Tim Holt, Red Mask, and A-1 Comics up until the institution of the Comics Code which "took a dim view" of supernatural horror in comics.

After the trademark to the character's name and motif lapsed, Marvel Comics debuted its own near-identical, horror-free version of the character in Ghost Rider #1 (cover-dated February 1967), by plotter and original Ghost Rider artist Ayers, and writers Gary Friedrich and Roy Thomas.

In an interview, Ayers recalled how the character was conceived, "Vin would come in and sit down and describe what he wanted in The Ghost Rider. He told me to go see Disney's Sleepy Hollow-Ichabod Crane, The Headless Horseman, and then he told me to play the Vaughn Monroe record, "Ghost Riders in the Sky." And then he started talking about what he wanted the guy wearing."

With the introduction of Marvel's supernatural Ghost Rider in the 1970s, Marvel renamed its Western Ghost Rider — first, to the unfortunate Night Rider (a term previously used in the Southern United States to refer to members of the Ku Klux Klan) in a 1974–1975 reprint series, and then to Phantom Rider. At least five men have been the Phantom Rider, one of whom is active in the modern day.

The Magazine Enterprises library of characters, including its version of Ghost Rider, was reprinted by AC Comics in the 1980s. While the copyrights have lapsed due to non-renewal, AC renamed the Ghost Rider as the Haunted Horseman, due to Marvel having maintained the Ghost Rider trademark.

== Fictional character biography ==
=== Carter Slade ===
Carter Slade, the first to wear the mask, debuted in Ghost Rider #1 (February 1967). He battled evil while dressed in a phosphorescent white costume, complete with a full-face mask, cape, and the hat. Slade received his outfit and horse from Flaming Star, a Native American medicine man.

He was never called the Phantom Rider in these original appearances. In Marvel continuity, it was not until after his death that the Phantom Rider name was given to the character, and reprints now retroactively use that name for Slade.

Johnny Blaze, the modern era Ghost Rider, eventually found himself transported into the 19th century where the latter met and teamed up with Slade, where he was badly wounded. Blaze took him to Flaming Star to be healed and then dealt with Slade's enemies. Slade recovered and Blaze returned to the present.

Slade's spirit, however, returned and possessed his descendant Hamilton to turn into a Phantom Rider and rode out to rescue Blaze from certain doom.

=== Jamie Jacobs ===
After Slade's death in Western Gunfighters #7 (January 1972), his sidekick Jamie Jacobs became the second Phantom Rider. He was soon killed in action.

=== Lincoln Slade ===
Lincoln Slade is Carter Slade's brother and a U.S. Marshal, as well as the third Phantom Rider. Lincoln is driven insane by his powers. When the West Coast Avengers are traveling through time on one of their adventures, Lincoln becomes infatuated with Mockingbird. Lincoln kidnaps the Avenger and flees to a secret location. He then drugs Mockingbird, removing the latter's ability to give or deny consent, and rapes her. Once the effects of the drugs wear off, the enraged Mockingbird fights and defeats him. In the battle's course, he is knocked over a cliff. As he clings to the cliffside, he first pleads with Mockingbird to help him, then attempts to reassert his hypnotic authority and orders her to help him. Hating him for his violation of her, Mockingbird allows him to fall to his death. Years later, Lincoln's spirit possesses his descendant Hamilton to seek "vengeance" against Mockingbird. His spirit returns a second time to make Mockingbird return his feelings.

Comic Book Resources placed him as one of the superheroes Marvel wants to be forgotten.

=== Reno Jones ===
In the miniseries Blaze of Glory, the African American gunslinger Reno Jones used the Ghost Rider identity briefly in a battle with the Ku Klux Klan-affiliated mercenaries called the Nightriders. Jones was one-half of the team called the Gunhawks, along with his former friend Kid Cassidy, whom Jones had believed dead. Cassidy was revealed to be alive and the leader of the Nightriders; he was killed, and Jones retired.

=== Hamilton Slade ===
In present-day continuity, Hamilton Slade is Lincoln Slade's distant descendant; an archaeologist, he finds the burial site of his legendary ancestor in the supernatural-motorcyclist series Ghost Rider. As he explores the site, he finds a large burial urn and from it appears the ghostly garb of his ancestors (Carter and Lincoln). Possessed by the spirits of his ancestors, he becomes a new version of the Phantom Rider, and rides off to rescue Johnny Blaze, the current Ghost Rider, from one of his foes. However, he retains no memory of his adventures as the Ghost Rider and eventually Lincoln's ghost would take over more frequently and haunt Mockingbird for his death. An exorcism releases the spirits of Carter and Lincoln from Hamilton. Lincoln is defeated and banished while Hamilton agrees to have Carter possess him. Hamilton attempts a similar exorcism to save his daughter Jaime from the returning spirit of Lincoln. He is killed by Crossfire as the exorcism is being completed.

=== J. T. Slade ===
Nick Fury recruits Carter Slade's grandson, James Taylor Slade (also known as J. T. Slade), introduced in The Mighty Avengers #13, to be part of Fury's team against the "Secret Invasion" of Skrulls. He has superhuman reflexes and the ability to cause a chain to ignite in flame and cause massive damage. The character roll call at the beginning of Secret Invasion #4 (September 2008) refers to J. T. as "Hellfire". Hellfire goes on to make numerous appearances in the ongoing series Secret Warriors. He is later revealed to be a Hydra double agent, with Nick Fury allowing him to fall to his death.

=== Jaime Slade ===
In the 2010 series Hawkeye & Mockingbird, it is revealed that Hamilton Slade had a daughter named Jaime Slade. While she was examining an urn belonging to the Slade family, Lincoln Slade's spirit possessed her, transforming Jaime into the new Phantom Rider. Claiming to be both "the spirit and the heir", the Phantom Rider teams up with Crossfire to battle the heroes Hawkeye and Mockingbird. Jaime's father attempts to exorcise her, but is killed by Crossfire.

== Other versions ==
The Phantom Riders, a gang inspired by the Phantom Rider, appear in Old Man Logan.

== In other media ==
=== Television ===
An original incarnation of the Phantom Rider appears in the Ultimate Spider-Man episode "Return to the Spider-Verse" Pt. 2, voiced by Clancy Brown. This version is a Wild West-themed alternate reality version of Ben Parker.

=== Film ===
The Carter Slade incarnation of Phantom Rider, credited as and amalgamated with the Caretaker, appears in Ghost Rider, portrayed by Sam Elliott. This version is a former Texas Ranger from the 19th century who sold his soul to Mephistopheles and became his servant as Ghost Rider before leaving his service and becoming a cemetery caretaker. After Johnny Blaze becomes the new Ghost Rider, Slade mentors him and gives him his shotgun before vanishing into the afterlife.

=== Video games ===
- The Phantom Rider appears as an alternate costume for Johnny Blaze / Ghost Rider in Marvel: Ultimate Alliance.
- Carter Slade, based on the film incarnation, appears in the Ghost Rider film tie-in game, voiced by Fred Tatasciore.
- The Phantom Rider appears in Lego Marvel Super Heroes 2.
