= Werner Roth (illustrator) =

American comic book artist

- Born: January 27, 1921
- Died: June 1973 (aged 52)
- Area: Penciller
- Pseudonym: Jay Gavin
- Notable works: The X-Men; Lorna, the Jungle Girl

Werner Roth was an American comic book artist, perhaps best known for immediately succeeding Jack Kirby on Marvel Comics' The X-Men. He was born in the German city of Zwickau on January 27, 1921, and died on Long Island on June 28, 1973.

== Career ==
Roth's work began appearing in Marvel Comics, then known as Atlas Comics, in 1953. Atlas editor Stan Lee has described being impressed with Roth's portfolio, particularly his drawings of women, "So I took his samples to show [then-publisher] Martin Goodman. I suggested we should use Werner, even create a comic for him. Which we did, and that was how Lorna, the Jungle Girl was born." Roth drew the first dozen issues of Lorna. He drew a number of other features for Atlas, including most of the stories of the Apache Kid. He later drew romance stories for DC Comics.

Roth returned to Marvel to work on the X-Men in 1965, initially using the pseudonym Jay Gavin, taken from the names of his two sons, to conceal his Marvel work from his editors at DC. His true name was revealed in the "Bullpen Bulletins" page of the Marvel Comics publications cover-dated September 1966. X-Men series writer Roy Thomas later commented that Roth, though a talented artist, was a poor fit for the X-Men, being more oriented towards character interactions and relationships than action. Roth pencilled the first appearances of the Banshee, the Cobalt Man, and Lorna Dane.

Roth later drew more Western comics for Marvel, and penciled issues of Superman's Girl Friend, Lois Lane for DC Comics. His first issue of that series, #106 (Nov. 1970), featured the controversial story "I Am Curious (Black)!", in which Lois Lane uses a machine to temporarily transform herself into an African American woman, allowing her to experience and report on racism first-hand .

== Bibliography ==
=== DC Comics ===
- Girls' Love Stories #164 (1971)
- Heart Throbs #62, 66, 83, 85 (1959–1963)
- House of Secrets #82 (1969)
- Love Stories #151 (1973)
- The Phantom Stranger (vol. 2) #4 (1969)
- Superman's Girl Friend, Lois Lane #106–121 (1970–1972)
- The Unexpected #115, 119, 133 (1969–1972)

=== Marvel Comics ===
- Apache Kid #2–9, 13–19 (1951–1956)
- The Avengers Annual #2 (1968)
- Kid Colt, Outlaw #62, 133, 138–140 (1956–1969)
- Lorna the Jungle Girl #6–12, 19 (1954–1956); formerly Lorna the Jungle Queen #1–5 (1953–1954)
- Marvel Tales #96, 113, 148 (1950–1956)
- Mystic #7, 10–11, 19 (1952–1953)
- Rawhide Kid #67, 79 (1968–1970)
- Strange Tales #34, 62, 66 (1955–1958)
- Tales to Astonish #96–98 (Namor, the Sub-Mariner) (1967)
- Venus #8–10, 12 (1950–1951)
- X-Men #13–29, 31–33, 35, 38–57 (1965–1969)
- Yellow Claw #1 (1956)

Preceded by Jack Kirby	Uncanny X-Men artist 1965–1969	Succeeded by Neal Adams
Preceded by Art Saaf and Ross Andru	Superman's Girl Friend, Lois Lane artist 1970–1972	Succeeded by John Rosenberger
