= Leonardo Manco =

Argentine artist (born 1971)

- Born: 16 December 1971 (age 54)
- Areas: Penciler, Inker
- Notable works: Hellblazer

Leonardo Manco (born 16 December 1971) is an Argentine comic book artist.

== Career ==
Manco is best known for his dark and gritty style on such titles as Marvel Comics’ Hellstorm (1994), Blaze of Glory (2000, #1-4), Apache Skies (2002, #1-4), Deathlok Vol. 3 (1999–2000), and Hellblazer (2004) from DC Comics’ Vertigo imprint.

Other work by Manco has included Marvel's Archangel #1 (1996), Werewolf by Night Vol.2 #1-6 (1998), Doom #1-3 (2000) and Doom: The Emperor Returns #1-3 (2002).

In 2004, he drew an original graphic novel Hellblazer: All His Engines, written by Mike Carey, and was the regular artist on the Hellblazer ongoing series for Vertigo. In June 2004, Manco was signed to a two-year exclusive contract with DC Comics.

Manco also contributed to the War Machine series from Marvel Comics.

== Bibliography ==
=== DC Comics ===
- Hellblazer #194-195, 200–205, 207–228, 230–237, 239–242, 247-249 (2004–08)
- John Constantine, Hellblazer: All His Engines (graphic novel, 2005)
- Wacky Raceland #1-6 (2016–17)

=== Marvel ===
- Hellstorm: Prince of Lies #8, 12–13, 15–16, 18-21 (1994)
- Druid, miniseries, #1-4 (1995)
- Wolverine Annual '97 (1997)
- Werewolf By Night Vol.2 #1-6 (1998)
- The Avengers '99 Annual (1999)
- Dr. Doom #1-3 (2000)
- War Machine #1-5 (2009)

=== Boom! Entertainment ===
- 28 Days Later #9 (2010)
- Clive Barker's Hellraiser: Pursuit of the Flesh Prelude + Chapters 1-2 (2012)

=== Collected Comics ===
- Hellblazer (DC Comics):
  - Stations of the Cross (with Mike Carey, collects #194–195 and 200, ISBN 1-4012-1002-3)
  - Reasons to be Cheerful (with Mike Carey, collects #201-205, ISBN 1-4012-1251-4)
  - The Gift (with Mike Carey, collects #207-212, September 2007, ISBN 1-4012-1453-3)
  - All His Engines (with Mike Carey, graphic novel, Vertigo, 2005, paperback, ISBN 1-4012-0317-5, hardcover, ISBN 1-4012-0316-7)
  - Empathy is the Enemy (with Denise Mina, collects #214–222, ISBN 1-4012-1066-X)
  - The Red Right Hand (with Denise Mina, collects #224–228, ISBN 1-4012-1342-1)
  - Joyride (with Andy Diggle, 192 pages, Vertigo, February 2008, ISBN 1-4012-1651-X, Titan, April 2008, ISBN 1-84576-775-6) collects:
    - "In at the Deep End" (Hellblazer #230-231, 2007)
    - "Wheels of Chance, Systems of Control" (Hellblazer #232-233, 2007)
    - "Joyride" (Hellblazer #234-237, 2007)
  - The Laughing Magician (with Andy Diggle, 128 pages, August 2008, ISBN 1-4012-1853-9) collects:
    - "The Passage" (Hellblazer #239, 2007)
    - "The Laughing Magician" (Hellblazer #240-242, 2008)

=== 2000 AD ===
- Judge Dredd: "A Better Class of Criminal" (with Rory McConville, 2000 AD #2091–2094, 2018)
- Sláine: "Dragontamer" (with Pat Mills, 2000 AD #2212–ongoing, 2020–2021)
