= Rawhide Kid =

Marvel Comics fictional character

- The Rawhide Kid as depicted in The Rawhide Kid (Vol. 4) #1 (June 2010). Art by John Cassaday.

Publication information
- Publisher: Marvel Comics
- First appearance: (first version); Rawhide Kid #1 (March 1955) (second version); Rawhide Kid #17 (August, 1960)
- Created by: (first version); Stan Lee (writer); Bob Brown (artist) (second version); Stan Lee; Jack Kirby

In-story information
- Alter ego: John Barton Clay; Johnny Bart
- Team affiliations: Avengers; West Coast Avengers; The Sensational Seven
- Notable aliases: Johnny Clay; Trey

The Rawhide Kid (real name: Johnny Bart, originally given as Johnny Clay) is a fictional Old West cowboy appearing in American comic books published by Marvel Comics. A heroic gunfighter of the 19th-century American West who was unjustly wanted as an outlaw, he is one of Marvel's most prolific Western characters. He and other Marvel western heroes have on rare occasions guest-starred through time travel in such contemporary titles as The Avengers and West Coast Avengers.

== Publication history ==
=== Atlas Comics ===
The Rawhide Kid debuted in the 16-issue Rawhide Kid series (March 1955-Sept. 1957) from Marvel's 1950s predecessor, Atlas Comics. The original Rawhide Kid was a blonde cowboy, that was never named, used a whip and was the friend of a child named Randy.

=== Marvel Comics ===
After a hiatus, the Rawhide Kid was rebooted for what was now Marvel Comics by writer Stan Lee, penciler Jack Kirby and inker Dick Ayers. Continuing the Atlas numbering with issue #17 (Aug. 1960), the title now featured a diminutive yet confident, soft-spoken fast gun constantly underestimated by bullying toughs, varmints, owlhoots, polecats, crooked saloon owners and other archetypes squeezed through the prism of Lee and Kirby's anarchic imagination. As in the outsized, exuberantly exaggerated action of the later-to-come World War II series Sgt. Fury and His Howling Commandos, The Rawhide Kid was now a freewheeling romp of energetic, almost slapstick action across cattle ranches, horse troughs, corrals, canyons and swinging chandeliers. Stringently moral, the Kid nevertheless showed a gleeful pride in his shooting and his acrobatic fight skills – never picking arguments, but constantly forced to surprise lummoxes far bigger than he was.

Through retcon, aspects of the Atlas and Silver Age characters' history meshed, so that the unnamed infant son of settlers the Clay family, orphaned by a Cheyenne raid, was raised by Texas Ranger Ben Bart on a ranch near Rawhide, Texas. Older brother Frank Clay, captured by Native Americans, eventually escaped and became a gambler, while eldest brother Joe Clay became sheriff of the town of Willow Flats; neither were in the regular cast, and each died in a guest appearance. Shortly after Johnny's 18th birthday, Ben Bart was murdered; Johnny, an almost preternaturally fast and accurate gunman, wounded the killers and left them to be taken into custody. A later misunderstanding between the Kid and a sheriff over a cattle rustler that the Kid wounded in self-defense led to the hero's life as a fugitive.

Rawhide Kid's full name was revealed in issue # 60 in the Letter's Column as John Barton Clay. The Rawhide Kid ended publication with issue #151 (May 1979).

The Rawhide Kid later appeared as a middle-aged character in a four-issue miniseries, The Rawhide Kid (vol. 2) (Aug.-Nov. 1985), by writer Bill Mantlo and penciler Herb Trimpe.

==== 2000s treatments ====
The Rawhide Kid reappeared in the four-issue miniseries Blaze of Glory (Feb.-March 2000; published biweekly), by writer John Ostrander and artist Leonardo Manco, and a 2002 four-issue sequel, Apache Skies, by the same creative team.

In contrast to the character's previously depicted appearance – a small-statured, clean-cut redhead – these latter two series depicted him with shoulder-length dark hair, and wearing a slightly less stylized, more historically appropriate outfit than his classic one.

A five-issue miniseries, Rawhide Kid (vol. 3) (April–June 2003), titled "Slap Leather" was published biweekly by Marvel's mature-audience MAX imprint. Here, the character was depicted as homosexual, with a good portion of the dialogue dedicated to innuendo to this effect.

A sequel miniseries, The Rawhide Kid (vol. 4) (Aug.-Nov. 2010), rendered with a subtitle on covers as Rawhide Kid: The Sensational Seven, found the Kid and his posse (consisting of Kid Colt, Doc Holliday, Annie Oakley, Billy the Kid, Red Wolf and the Two-Gun Kid) track the villainous Cristo Pike after Pike and his gang kidnap Wyatt and Morgan Earp.

== Fictional character biography ==
Johnny Clay was born in 1850 and orphaned as an infant, adopted by Ben Bart. In 1868 his "uncle" was murdered, and Johnny left the family ranch. In 1869 he became a wanted man. In 1870 he fought the Living Totem. In 1872 he captured the costumed Grizzly with the help of the Two-Gun Kid. He joined Kid Colt to defeat Iron Mask. In 1873 he met the Avengers In 1874 he met Doc Holliday. In 1875, he helped the Black Panther with Kid Colt and the Two-Gun Kid. In 1876 the Rawhide Kid, Kid Colt and the Two-Gun Kid faced Red Raven, Iron Mask and the Living Totem with the help of the time-stranded West Coast Avengers. In 1879 he met the Apache Kid. Subsequently, he became a performer for Buffalo Bill's Wild West Show where he remained until 1885. In 1897 he took an understudy under his tutelage.

== Other versions ==
=== Marvel Zombies ===
When a meteorite landed on Earth-483, it emitted radiation that resurrected the Rawhide Kid's corpse and all of the corpses buried in the adjacent Boot Hill as zombies. The Rawhide Kid and the other reanimated gunslingers invade a nearby town before being killed by Hurricane.

=== Secret Wars ===
During the Secret Wars storyline, the Rawhide Kid appears as a member of the Thor Corps who guards a Wild West-themed domain of Battleworld called the Valley of Doom. He arrested that region's version of Hank Pym for illegal possession of adamantium, which led to Pym being banished to the Ultron-infested domain of Perfection.

== In other media ==
The Rawhide Kid appears in Lego Marvel Super Heroes 2.

== Reception ==
Comic Book Resources placed the 2000 series depiction of the Rawhide Kid as one of the superheroes Marvel wants you to forget.

== See also ==
- LGBT themes in American mainstream comics
- LGBT themes in comics
