= List of Marvel Comics nicknames =

Marvel Comics editor-in-chief Stan Lee was known for bestowing humorous nicknames on himself, as well as Marvel's other creators, members of the "Bullpen," and various staff members (i.e.., "Marveldom Assembled"). Later editors-in-chief like Roy Thomas and Archie Goodwin continued the tradition, until Jim Shooter discontinued the practice in the 1980s. It was re-established by Mark Gruenwald when he started editing "Bullpen Bulletins" in the late 1980s. The convention was inspired, at least in part, by a Hollywood tradition, where character actors in particular were given colorful nicknames to aid in their name recognition.

Monikers like Stan "The Man" Lee and Jack "King" Kirby permeated into mass culture. This is a list of those nicknames.

== List ==
Name	Area	Nickname
A
Dan Adkins	Penciler, Inker	"Dandy" Dan Adkins
Alfredo Alcala	Penciler, Inker	"Awesome" Alfredo Alcala
Vicente Alcazar	Artist	"Vulcanizin'" Vicente Alcazar
Arthur Adams	Artist	"Amazing" Art Adams
Neal Adams	Artist	"Nefarious" Neal Adams
Bill Anderson	Inker	"Wild" Bill Anderson
Craig Anderson	Editor	"Credible" Craig Anderson
Ross Andru	Artist	Ross "Boss" Andru
Adam Austin a.k.a. Gene Colan	Artist	"Artistic" Adam Austin
Terry Austin	Inker	"Timorous" Terry Austin "Terrific" Terry Austin; Terry "Cloak Dagger" Austin
Dick Ayers	Inker	"Darlin'" Dick Ayers
B
Gary Barnum	Assistant editor	"Gallant" Gary Barnum
Naomi Basner	Operations assistant	"Nimble" Naomi Basner
Howard Bender	Artist	"Humble" Howard Bender
Mary Ellen Beveridge	Editorial assistant, Colorist	"Mellow" Mary Ellen Beveridge
Beth Bleckley	Editorial assistant, Letterer	"Beaming" Beth Bleckley
Bret Blevins	Penciller, Inker	Bret "Dark Crystal" Blevins
Wayne Boring	Artist	"Duke" Wayne Boring
Tom Brevoort	Editor	"Titanic" Tom Brevoort
Sol Brodsky	Production manager, Vice president, operations	Sol "Who's He?" Brodsky "Jolly" Solly Brodsky
Bob Brown	Artist	"Battlin'" Bob Brown
Eliot R. Brown	Artist, assistant editor	Eliot "Mr. Technical" Brown
Frank Brunner	Artist	"Far Out'" Frank Brunner
Rich Buckler	Artist	"Roarin'" Rich Buckler "Riotous" Rich Buckler
Bob Budiansky	Writer, artist	"Bouncing" Bob Budiansky
John Buscema	Artist	"Big" John Buscema "Jovial" John Buscema
Sal Buscema	Artist	"Our Pal" Sal Buscema
John Byrne	Artist	"Jocular" John Byrne "Corruscatin' Canajan"
C
Joey Cavalieri	Editor	"Jolly" Joey Cavalieri
Tony Cerniglia	Mailroom supervisor	"Titanic" Tony Cerniglia
Cleo Caron Chan	Ernie Chan's daughter	"Captivatin'" Cleo
Ernie Chan	Artist	"Earnest" Ernie Chan
Bobbie Chase	Editor	"Battling" Bobbie Chase "Breathtaking" Bobbie Chase
Howard Chaykin	Artist	"Wholesome" Howie Chaykin
Dan Chichester	Editor, Writer	"Daring" Dan Chichester
Chris Claremont	Writer	"Cheerful" Chris Claremont "Charismatic" Chris Claremont "Clever" Chris Claremont
Dave Cockrum	Artist	"Dynamic" Dave Cockrum "Daring" Dave Cockrum "Delightful" Dave Cockrum
Paty Cockrum	Production staffer	"Peerless" Paty "Pulchritudinous" Paty
Dave Cohen	Assistant production manager	"Dependable" Dave Cohen
Gene Colan	Artist	Gene "The Dean" Colan "Gentleman" Gene Colan "Genial" Gene Colan
Vince Colletta	Inker	Vince "The Prince" Colletta "Valiant" Vince Colletta
Ernie Colón	Artist	"Ever-Ready" Ernie Colon
Gerry Conway	Writer	"Merry" Gerry Conway "Gallopin'" Gerry Conway
Martha Conway	Secretary	"Memorable" Martha Conway
Danny Crespi	Letterer, Assistant production manager	"Dubious" Danny Crespi
Dan Cuddy	Assistant editor	"Delirious" Dan Cuddy
D
Mickey Demeo a.k.a. Mike Esposito	Inker	"Mirthful" Mick Demeo
Davida Dale	Art production staffer	"Devastating" Davida Dale
Tom DeFalco	Editor-in-chief	"Two-Fisted" Tom DeFalco "Titanic" Tom DeFalco
Suzanne Dell'Orto	Assistant editor	"Sizzling" Suzanne Dell'Orto
Tony DeZuniga	Artist	"Temendously-Talented" Tony DeZuniga "Trailblazin'" Tony DeZuniga
James DiGiovanni	Assistant editor	"Joshing" James DiGiovanni "Slim" Jim DiGiovanni
Steve Ditko	Artist	"Shy" Steve Ditko "Sturdy" Steve Ditko
Karen Dougherty	Letterer	"Kuddly" Karen Dougherty
Arnold Drake	Writer	"Artful" Arnold Drake
Jo Duffy	Editorial assistant, Writer, Editor	"Gentle" Jo Duffy "Mannerly" Mary Jo Duffy
Barry Dutter	Assistant editor	"Big" Barry Dutter
E
Scott Edelman	Assistant editor	"Sparkling" Scott Edelman
Steve Englehart	Writer	"Stainless" Steve Englehart "The Stainless One" "Stalwart" Steve Englehart "Sturdy" Steve Englehart
Mike Esposito	Penciler, Inker	"Mighty" Mike Esposito
Bill Everett	Artist	"Wild" Bill Everett
F
Eric Fein	Assistant editor	"Exuberant" Eric Fein
Danny Fingeroth	Editor	"Dandy" Danny Fingeroth "Uncanny" Danny Fingeroth
Michael Fleisher	Writer	"Macabre" Michael Fleisher
Irving Forbush	"World's most famous non-entity"	"Honest" Irving Forbush
Gary Friedrich	Writer	"Groovy" Gary Friedrich
Mike Friedrich	Writer	"Mischievous" Mike Friedrich
G
Carl Gafford	Colorist	Carl "The Gaff" Gafford
John Galvin	Mailroom employee	"Hopalong" John Galvin
Steve Gan	Artist	"Startling" Steve Gan "Socko" Steve Gan "Smashing" Steve Gan
Steve Gerber	Writer, consulting editor	Steve "Baby" Gerber
Frank Giacoia	Inker	"Fearless" Frank Giacoia
Michael Golden	Artist	"Magical" Mike Golden
Archie Goodwin	Editor	"Amiable" Archie Goodwin "Artful" Archie Goodwin "Affable" Archie Goodwin
Chip Goodman	Marvel merchandising manager	"Cheerful" Chip Goodwin
Martin Goodman	Publisher	"Merry" Marty Goodman
Al Gordon	Inker	"Able" Al Gordon
Billy Graham	Penciller, Inker	"Irreverent" Billy Graham
Lenny Grow	Production Chief	"Liltin'" Lenny Grow
Mark Gruenwald	Editor	"Masterful" Mark Gruenwald "Madcap" Mark Gruenwald
Paul Gulacy	Penciler	"Peerless" Paul Gulacy
H
Bob Hall	Writer, Editor	"Beaming" Bob Hall "Battlin'" Bob Hall "Broadway" Bob Hall
Larry Hama	Artist	"Lethal" Larry Hama "Lucky" Larry Hama
Ed Hannigan	Penciller, writer, assistant editor	"Edwardian" Ed Hannigan "Energetic" Ed Hannigan "Edifying" Ed Hannigan
Jim Harmon	Editor	"Big" Jim Harmon
John Hayes	Business manager, Circulation director	"Genial" Johnny Hayes
Don Heck	Penciler, Inker	"Dashing" Don Heck "Dazzling" Don Heck
Mark Heike	Penciler	Mark "Hut-Hut" Heike
Mike Heisler	Letterer	"Marvelous" Mike Heisler
Glenn Herdling	Assistant editor	"Gargantuan" Glenn Herdling
Carmine Infantino	Penciler	"Creative" Carmine Infantino
I
Sharon Ing	Production assistant	"Shimmering" Sharon Ing
Tony Isabella	Writer, editor	Tony "The Tiger" Isabella
Geof Isherwood	Inker	"Jubilant" Geof Isherwood
J
Sid Jacobson	Editor	"Scintillating" Sid Jacobson
Debra James	Letterer	"Dazzling" Debra James
Klaus Janson	Inker	"Santa" Klaus Janson
Arthur Jeffrey	"Defender of the faith"	"Admirable" Arthur Jeffrey
Carla Joseph	Secretary	"Cute" Carla Joseph
K
Gil Kane	Penciler	Gil "Sugar" Kane; Gil "Sugar Lips" Kane "Garrulous" Gil Kane
Hellen Katz	Assistant editor	"Heavenly" Hellen Katz
Jack Kirby	Penciler, writer	Jack "King" Kirby "Jolly" Jack Kirby "The Jolly One" "Jumpin'" Jack Kirby
David Anthony Kraft	Writer	Dave "The Dude" Kraft
Mike Kudzinowski	Mailroom employee	Mike "Great K" Kudzinowski
Alan Kupperberg	Artist	"Audacious" Alan Kupperberg
Al Kurzrok	Writer, Production dept. staffer	"Affable" Al Kurzrok
L
Paul Laikin	Editor	"Possessed" Paul Laikin
Bob Larkin	Artist	"Battlin'" Bob Larkin
Jim Lee	Penciller	Jim "Don't Call Me Happy" Lee
Stan Lee	Publisher, editor-in-chief, Writer, Editor	Stan "The Man" Lee "Smilin'" Stan Lee
Steve Leialoha	Artist	"Surfer'" Steve Leialoha; Steve "Coyote" Leialoha
Larry Lieber	Writer	"Laughin'" Larry Lieber "Larrupin'" Larry Lieber
Daniel Locario	Mailroom employee	Daniel "Poppy" Locario
M
Ralph Macchio	Editor	"Reliable" Ralph Macchio
Tom Mandrake	Penciller, Inker	Tom "New Mutants" Mandrake
Bill Mantlo	Writer	"Brave-Hearted" Bill Mantlo "Mantlo-Man" "Boisterous" Bill Mantlo "The Boisterous One"
Karen Mantlo	Letterer	"Karefree" Karen Mantlo "Kittenish" Karen Mantlo
Pablo Marcos	Inker	"Prolific" Pablo Marcos
Rick Marschall	Editor	"Rakish" Rick Marschall
Dwayne McDuffie	Writer/Editor	"Daring" Dwayne McDuffie
Todd McFarlane	Writer/Artist	"Tumultuous" Todd McFarlane
Don McGregor	Writer	"Dauntless" Don McGregor "Dutiful" Don McGregor
Dickie McKenzie	Proofreader	"Dazzling" Dickie McKenzie
Roger McKenzie	Writer	"Rebel" Roger McKenzie "Ramblin'" Roger McKenzie
Marcus McLaurin	Managing editor	"Mad" Marcus McLaurin
David Michelinie	Writer	"The Deliberate One" "Deliberate" Dave
Al Milgrom	Artist	"Amiable" Al Milgrom "Affable" Al Milgrom "Mighty" Al Milgrom "Big" Al Milgrom
Frank Miller	Artist	"Lanky" Frank Miller
Doug Moench	Writer	"Devil-May-Care" Doug Moench
Jim Mooney	Penciler, Inker	"Gentleman" Jim Mooney "Jaunty" Jim Mooney; Jim "Madman" Mooney
Nancy Murphy	Subscription manager	"Nifty" Nancy Murphy
N
Mindy Newell	Assistant editor	"Merry" Mindy Newell
Alex Niño	Artist	"Active" Alex Niño
Earl Norem	Artist	"Earnest" Earl Norem
Jim Novak	Letterer	"Diamond" Jim Novak
O
Glynis Oliver	Colorist	"Gracious" Glynis Oliver
Dennis O'Neil	Writer	"Dandy" Denny O'Neil
Tom Orzechowski	Letterer	"Titanic" Tom Orzechowski "Terrific" Tom Orzechowski "Tough" Tom Orzechowski
P
Tom Palmer	Inker	"Terrific" Tom Palmer
Bruce Patterson	Inker	"Brash" Bruce Patterson
George Pérez	Artist	George "Pacesetter" Pérez "Gorgeous" George Pérez
Don Perlin	Artist	"Dutiful" Don Perlin "Whirlin'" Don Perlin "Dapper" Don Perlin
Andrew Perry	Assistant editor	"Agonizing" Andrew Perry
Mike Ploog	Artist	"Madcap" Mike Ploog "Maniacal" Mike Ploog
Keith Pollard	Penciller	"Punch 'Em Up" Keith Pollard "Klobbering" Keith Pollard "Creative" Keith Pollard
R
Ralph Reese	Artist	"Roisterous" Ralph Reese
Frank Robbins	Artist	"Free-Wheelin'" Frank Robbins
Diane Rodrigo	Subscriptions dept. assistant	"Dimply" Diane Rodrigo
John Romita, Jr.	Penciller	"Jet-propelled" John Jr. "Jubilant" John Romita, Jr.
John Romita, Sr.	Artist	Johnny "Ring-A-Ding" Romita "Jaunty" Johnny Romita "Jazzy" John(ny) Romita "The Jazzy One"
Sam Rosen	Letterer	"Swingin'" Sammy Rosen; Sammy "Dosin'" Rosen
Werner Roth	Artist	"Wondrous" Werner Roth
George Roussos	Colorist	"Genuine" George Roussos
Mike Royer	Inker	"Madman" Mike Royer
Joe Rubinstein	Inker	Joe "The Rube" Rubinstein
S
Jim Salicrup	Editor	"Slim" Jim Salicrup "Arachnerd" Jim Salicrup
Michael Sandy	Production staffer	"Dandy" Michael Sandy
Stu Schwartzberg	Writer	"Sturdy" Stu Schwartzberg
John Severin	Artist	"Jovial" John Severin "Long" John Severin
Marie Severin	Artist	"Mirthful" Marie Severin "Magnificent" Marie Severin "Madcap" Marie Severin; Marie "the She" Severin "Marvel-ous" Marie Severin
Dave Sharpe	Letterer	Dave "The Lettering Guy" Sharpe
Jim Shooter	Writer, Editor-in-Chief	Big Jim; Jim "Trouble" Shooter "Gigantic" Jim Shooter "Jaunty Jimmy" Shooter; Jim "Straight" Shooter
Sonja Skarstedt	Writer, Artist	"Red" Sonja Skarstedt
Doris Siegler	Bookkeeper	"Delicious" Doris Siegler
Artie Simek	Letterer	"Adorable" Artie Simek; Artie "The Smartie" Simek
Joe Sinnott	Inker	"Joltin'" Joe Sinnott "Jolly" Joe Sinnott
Evan Skolnick	Editor	"Evanescent" Evan Skolnick
Frank Springer	Artist	"Fearless" Frank Springer "Fancy" Frank Springer
Jim Starlin	Artist	"Judo" Jim Starlin
Flo Steinberg	Corresponding secretary	"Fabulous" Flo Steinberg
Jim Steranko	Writer, artist	"Jaunty" Jim Steranko; The Jaunty One
Roger Stern	Assistant editor, writer	Roger "Sterno" Stern "Sterno"
Terry Stewart	President	"Merry" Terry Stewart
Chic Stone	Inker	Chic "Magnet" Stone "Cheerful" Chic Stone
Warren Storob	Production staffer	"Wandering" Warren Storob
T
John Tartaglione	Artist, Production staffer	"Jumping" John Tartaglione
Linda Taxel	Administrative assistant	"Lilting" Linda Taxel
Roy Thomas	Editor, Writer	"Rascally" Roy Thomas
Frank Thorne	Artist	"Fightin'" Frank Thorne
Herb Trimpe	Artist	"Happy" Herb Trimpe "Howlin'" Herb Trimpe
Mike Trimpe	Inker	"Madcap" Mike Trimpe
Sonny Trinidad	Penciler	"Slammin'" Sonny Trinidad
Lisa Trusiani	Editor, writer	"Lovely'" Lisa Trusiani
Sara Tuchinsky	Assistant editor	"Sassy" Sara Tuchinsky
George Tuska	Artist	"Gorgeous" George Tuska
V
Brad Vancata	Colorist	Brad "I'm Gonna Have Fun With This One" Vancata
Irene Vartanoff	Colorist, Reprint production manager	"Impish" Irene Vartanoff
John Verpoorten	Production manager	"Jumbo" John Verpoorten
Mike Vosburg	Artist	"Meticulous" Mike Vosburg
W
Don Warfield	Colorist	"Dashing" Don Warfield
John Warner	Editor, Writer	"Joltin'" John Warner "Joyful" John Warner
Len Wein	Writer	"Live-It-Up" Len Wein "Lively" Len Wein "The Lively One"
Dave Wenzel	Artist	"Dashing" Dave Wenzel
Bob Wiacek	Inker	"Bumptious" Bob Wiacek
Bonnie Wilford	Colorist	"Bashful" Bonnie Wilford
Ron Wilson	Penciler	"Rampaging" Ron Wilson
Barry Windsor-Smith	Artist	"Bashful" Barry Smith
Marv Wolfman	Writer, Editor	"Marvelous" Marv Wolfman "The Marvelous One" "The Wandering Wolfman"
Michele Wolfman	Colorist	"Meticulous" Michele Wolfman
Wally Wood	Artist	"Wandering" Wally Wood
Gregory Wright	Editor	"Grouchy" Gregory Wright
Bernie Wrightson	Artist	"Bashful" Bernie Wrightson
Y
Andy Yanchus	Colorist	"Handy" Andy Yanchus
Nelson Yomtov	Colorist	"'Nuff Said" Nelson Yomtov; Nel "Why Does My Last Name Sound Like Something Out of Starblazers?" Yomtov
Z
Mike Zeck	Artist	"Miraculous" Mike Zeck
Dwight Jon Zimmerman	Assistant editor	"Diligent" Dwight Jon Zimmerman

== See also ==
- Bullpen Bulletins
- Hypocoristic
- List of Marvel Comics people
- Lists of nicknames – nickname list articles on Wikipedia
- Moniker
- Nickname
- Stage name
- Term of endearment
