= List of Marvel Comics people =

Marvel Comics is an American comic book company. These are some of the people (artists, editors, executives, writers) who have been associated with the company in its history, as Marvel and its predecessors, Timely Comics and Atlas Comics.

- Jack Abel a.k.a. "Gary Michaels"
- Art Adams
- Dan Adkins
- Vince Alascia
- Alfredo Alcala
- Vicente Alcazar
- Ross Andru
- Avi Arad
- Ruth Atkinson a.k.a. "Ruth Atkinson Ford"
- Chuck Austen
- Al Avison
- Dick Ayers
- Mark Bagley
- Ken Bald
- Brent Peeples
- Violet Barclay
- Clive Barker
- Max Bemis
- Robert Bernstein a.k.a. "R. Berns"
- Brian Michael Bendis
- Tom Brevoort
- Pat Broderick
- Sol Brodsky
- Ed Brubaker
- Frank Brunner
- Steve Buccellato
- Rich Buckler
- Dan Buckley
- Carl Burgos
- John Buscema
- Sal Buscema
- Kurt Busiek
- John Byrne
- Mike Carlin
- Vic Carrabotta
- Hank Chapman
- Bobbie Chase
- Frank Chiaramonte
- Chris Claremont
- Dave Cockrum
- Gene Colan a.k.a. "Adam Austin"
- Vince Colletta
- Gerry Conway
- Johnny Craig
- Paris Cullins
- Jon D'Agostino a.k.a. "Johnny Dee"
- Peter David
- Gene Day
- Tom DeFalco
- Tony DeZuniga
- Tony DiPreta
- Steve Dillon
- Steve Ditko
- Arnold Drake
- Jo Duffy a.k.a. Mary Jo Duffy
- Harlan Ellison
- Steve Englehart
- Garth Ennis
- Steve Epting
- Mike Esposito (comics) a.k.a. "Mickey Demeo", "Mickey Dee". "Joe Guadioso"
- Bill Everett
- Glenn Fabry
- Vincent Fago
- Danny Fingeroth
- Linda Fite
- Gary Friedrich
- Mike Friedrich
- Al Gabriele
- Neil Gaiman
- David Gallaher
- Steve Gerber
- Frank Giacoia a.k.a. "Frank Ray"
- Stan Goldberg a.k.a. "Stan G."
- Michael Golden
- Archie Goodwin
- Martin Goodman
- Billy Graham (comics)
- Sam Grainger
- Mark Gruenwald
- Paul Gulacy
- Caesar Crawford
- Paul Gustavson
- Larry Hama
- Ed Hannigan
- Ernie Hart a.k.a. "H.E. Huntley"
- Bob Harras
- Al Hartley
- Russ Heath
- Don Heck
- Carl Icahn
- Tony Isabella
- Geof Isherwood
- Marie Javins
- Bill Jemas
- Paul Jenkins
- Klaus Janson
- Arvell Jones
- Carol Kalish
- Gil Kane a.k.a. "Scott Edwards"
- Jack Keller (comics)
- Sam Kieth
- Fred Kida
- Jack Kirby
- George Klein (comics)
- Annette Kawecki
- Daniel Keyes
- Scott Kolins
- David Anthony Kraft
- Adam Kubert
- Andy Kubert
- Joe Kubert
- Erik Larsen
- Leon Lazarus
- Elaine Lee
- Jae Lee
- Jim Lee
- Stan Lee
- Steve Leialoha
- Rick Leonardi
- Larry Lieber
- Rob Liefeld
- Scott Lobdell
- Pauline Loth
- Frank Lovece
- Ralph Macchio
- David W. Mack
- Howard Mackie
- Leonardo Manco
- Joe Maneely
- Pablo Marcos
- Henry Martinez
- Val Mayerik
- Todd McFarlane
- Don McGregor
- Frank McLaughlin
- Marcus McLaurin
- Pop Mhan
- David Michelinie
- Mike Mignola
- Mark Millar
- Frank Miller
- Peter Milligan
- Paul S. Newman
- Doug Moench
- Jim Mooney
- Jon J. Muth
- Charles Nicholas
- Fabian Nicieza
- Alex Niño
- Ann Nocenti
- Jim Novak
- Michael Avon Oeming
- Mike Okamoto
- Glynis Oliver
- Joe Orlando
- Tom Orzechowski
- James Owsley (see Christopher Priest)
- Jimmy Palmiotti
- Lisa Patrick
- Ronald Perelman
- George Pérez
- Don Perlin
- Ike Perlmutter
- Mike Ploog
- Keith Pollard
- Whilce Portacio
- Carl Potts
- Bob Powell (comics)
- Christopher Priest
- Howard Purcell
- Joe Quesada
- Nestor Redondo
- Ralph Reese
- Paul Reinman
- Don Rico a.k.a. "N. Korok"
- James Robinson
- Marshall Rogers
- John Romita, Jr.
- John Romita, Sr.
- Werner Roth (comics) a.k.a. "Jay Gavin"
- Joe Rosen
- Sam Rosen
- Alex Ross
- George Roussos a.k.a. "George Bell"
- Josef Rubinstein
- Greg Rucka
- Christopher Rule
- P. Craig Russell
- Jim Salicrup
- Christie Scheele
- Alex Schomburg
- Mike Sekowsky
- John Severin
- Marie Severin
- Jim Shooter
- Syd Shores
- Jerry Siegel
- Bill Sienkiewicz
- Marc Silvestri
- Artie Simek
- Joe Simon
- Louise Simonson
- Walt Simonson
- Joe Sinnott
- Steve Skroce
- Dan Slott
- Kevin Smith
- Mickey Spillane
- Frank Springer
- Jim Starlin
- Flo Steinberg
- Jim Steranko
- Roger Stern
- Chic Stone
- J. Michael Straczynski
- Tom Sutton
- John Tartaglione
- Roy Thomas
- Pete Tumlinson
- George Tuska
- John Verpoorten
- Brian K. Vaughan
- Mike Vosburg
- Mark Waid
- Lana Wachowski
- Len Wein
- Morris Weiss
- Joss Whedon
- Ogden Whitney
- Anthony Williams (comics)
- Al Williamson
- Ron Wilson
- Barry Windsor-Smith a.k.a. "Barry Smith"
- Ed Winiarski
- David Wohl
- Marv Wolfman
- Wally Wood
- Bill Walton (comics)
- Gregory Wright

== See also ==
- List of Marvel Comics nicknames
- List of comic creators
- List of comics creators appearing in comics
- Women in comics
