= The Life of Pope John Paul II =

1982 Marvel comic

Publication information
- Publisher: Marvel Comics
- Format: One-shot
- Genre: Historical
- Publication date: October 1, 1982
- No. of issues: 1

Creative team
- Written by: Steven Grant
- Penciller: John Tartaglione
- Inker: Joe Sinnott
- Letterer: Jim Novak
- Colorist: Marie Severin

The Life of Pope John Paul II is an oversized one-shot comic book published by Marvel Comics in 1982. It was written by Steven Grant with art by John Tartaglione, Joe Sinnott, Jim Novak, and Marie Severin. The comic recounts the life of Pope John Paul II, beginning with his birth as Karol Wojtyła and ending as he recovers from a 1981 assassination attempt. The idea of a comic covering his life was conceived of by Marvel Japan representative Gene Pelc, and John Paul II assigned his biographer and childhood friend Mieczysław Maliński to help Grant research the comic. The comic was reworked following the assassination attempt and its release was delayed by the December 1981 imposition of marshal law in Poland.

The Life of Pope John Paul II was a commercial success, selling about one million copies. In his book Comic Book Propaganda, Fredrik Strömberg remarked that the comic was the most engaging biography of John Paul II he had read.

== Plot ==
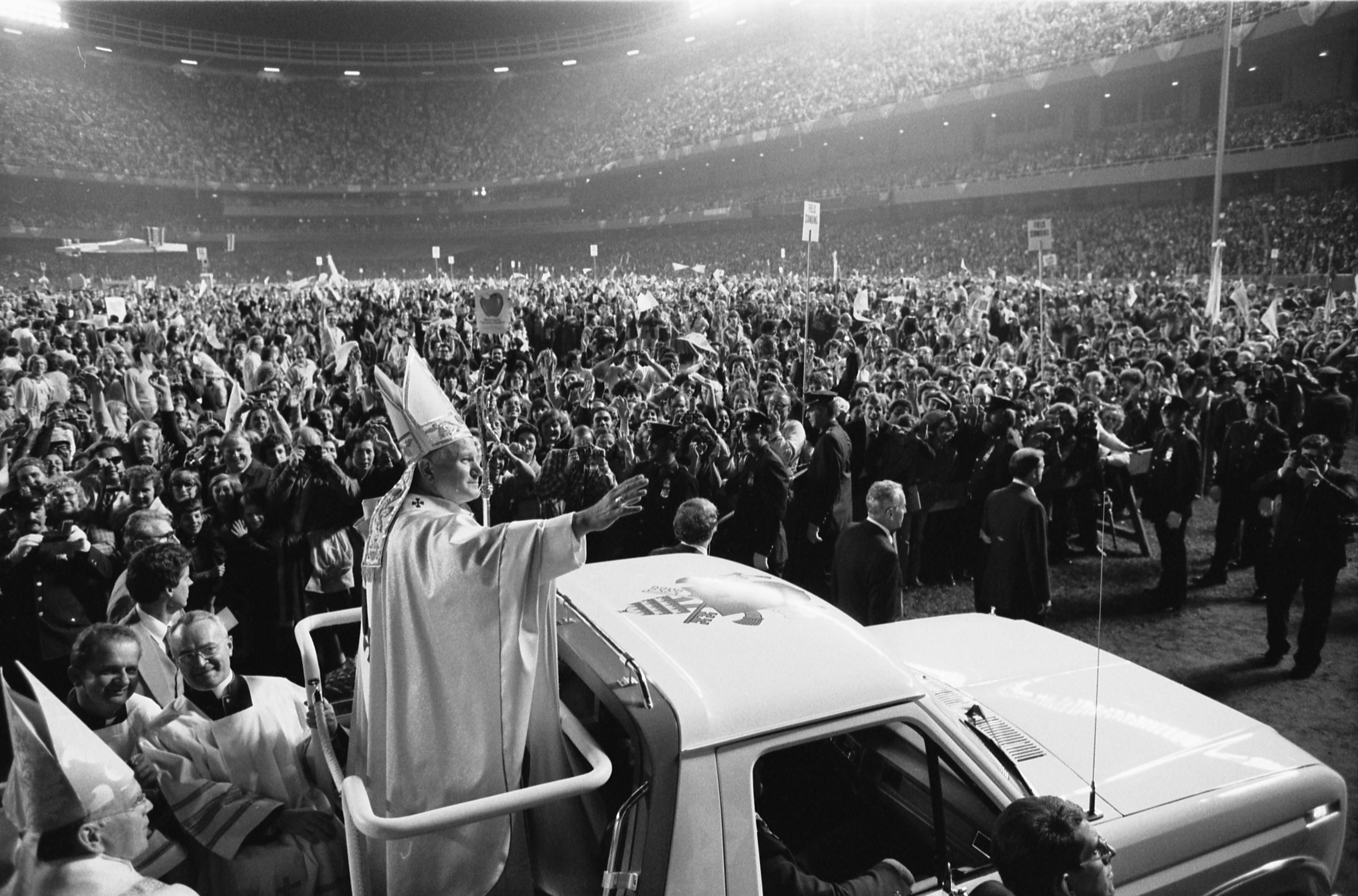
Pope John Paul II at Yankee Stadium

The comic is told from the perspective of a newspaper reporter on the Pope beat. The reporter feels that he does not fully understand Pope John Paul II and so he comes to hear him speak at Yankee Stadium on October 2, 1979, where the pope is set to deliver mass. While waiting for the pope to speak, he recounts the facts of his life, beginning with the 1920 birth of Karol Wojtyła in Wadowice, Poland, and ending with his election as pope and the beginning of his travels. After the reporter finishes recounting his life, the pope speaks. All listen and raucous kids are brought to order. The reporter understands the pope and thinks "That is why the pope is great!". The reporter feels that listening to the pope was a revelatory experience. He recounts more of John Paul II's travels until May 13, 1981, when the pope is shot in an attempted assassination. The reporter is shocked by the attempt, causing his boss to assume that he is Catholic, an assumption he rejects, saying his despair at the assassination attempt has nothing to do with religion. The reporter leaves work early, walking mindlessly to St. Patrick's Cathedral, where he helps a Polish immigrant enter the cathedral so they can pray for him together. The pope survives the attempt and a few weeks later he speaks to a crowd at St. Peter's Square on Pentecost Sunday.

== Development ==
=== Francis, Brother of the Universe ===
The Life of Pope John Paul II was preceded by Francis, Brother of the Universe, a biography of Francis of Assisi. It began with Gene Pelc, a Polish American Marvel employee who had moved to Japan in the 1970s to explore licensing and distributing Marvel properties in the Japanese market, such as a Spider-Man TV series. Pelc said that once, when he went to mass at Tokyo's English-speaking Franciscan Chapel Center, priest Campion Lally approached Pelc about Marvel publishing a comic based on Francis's life to coincide with the 800th anniversary of his birth. Marvel approved the comic after Paulist Press agreed to purchase 250,000 issues, which was more than the average comic sold. Friar Roy Gasnick, an expert on Francis who had previously advised on the off-Broadway musical Francis and the film Brother Sun, Sister Moon, consulted on the comic. It was released in 1980, to critical and commercial success, selling over a million copies.

=== Creation ===
Mieczysław Maliński holds the comic

Pope John Paul II visited Japan in February 1981, which prompted Pelc to begin thinking of a comic based on his life. Pelc was introduced to John Paul II's childhood friend Mieczysław Maliński. According to Pelc, Maliński consulted with the pope, who approved of a comic book biography if Maliński consulted and after his entourage was shown copies of Francis. The comic was written by Steven Grant, penciled by John Tartaglione, inked by Joe Sinnott, lettered by Jim Novak, and colored by Marie Severin. Grant self-described as a lapsed Catholic. Marvel president Jim Galton said that Tartaglione was selected because he was a competent artist who did not exaggerate, as they wanted to avoid deifying the pope. The comic was referred to by its creators as "the pope book". Maliński provided information on John Paul II's life, gave three photos of young John Paul II to help Tartaglione, and also met with Marvel editor-in-chief Jim Shooter and Grant. The comic's story was reworked following the assassination attempt. In December 1981, Poland's communist government instituted martial law to suppress Solidarity. This frayed communication lines with Maliński and delayed the comic's planned Easter 1982 release date. Grant recalled that he included information in the comic if it was verified by multiple sources.

== Content and themes ==
The comic does not opine on John Paul II's political opinions, such as his opposition to birth control. In an interview, Grant defended this omission and said "I don't know how you do that in a comic book". Marvel's assistant direct sales manager Peter David described the comic as being aimed at the general reader but said it had been written at an adult level. It was alternatively characterized as being targeted at younger readers.

== Publication history ==
The comic was published on October 1, 1982. It was cover dated January 1983. Comics sold in the direct market lacked a UPC bar code on the cover and instead featured an image of Spider-Man. Sales to Catholics were handled by Paulist Press. It was translated into multiple languages, including French and German. Marvel Comics owned the copyright of the artwork, while Maliński owned the copyright for the text. In a 1984 interview with The Globe and Mail, a nun said that interest in the comic increased ahead of John Paul II visiting Canada.

== Reception ==
=== Commercial performance ===
The comic cost $1.50 ($5.00 in 2025), more than twice the then-standard 0.60¢ price for comics. The comic's first run of approximately 500,000 comics, a little less than twice the amount printed for the average superhero comic, sold out within a month of publication. A 1986 article in The Baltimore Sun reported that the comic was receiving biannual reprinting runs of 50,000 copies. The comic sold about one million copies, mainly due to large orders from Catholic agencies.

The Flint Journal interviewed comic book sellers in Flint, Michigan, who said that the book had sold well, surprising them. The Clarion Ledger interviewed sellers around Jackson, Mississippi, who said that the book was selling poorly.

=== By the Vatican and Catholic officials ===
In an interview, David said "I think every Catholic in America wants to get one." Kenneth A. Briggs of The New York Times characterized the pope's approval of the comic as quixotic. Bishop Bernard Joseph Flanagan approved of the comic.

=== Critical response ===
In his book Comic Book Propaganda, Fredrik Strömberg remarked that the comic was the most engaging biography of John Paul II he had read. Rick Brough of The Park City Newspaper, while criticizing the ability for Marvel's art to humanize, found that John Paul II had been drawn with "reasonable faithfulness", but otherwise offered criticism towards the physical appearances of characters and other artistic and stylistic choices.

=== Legacy ===
Following the success of The Life of Pope John Paul II, Marvel published Mother Teresa of Calcutta, a biography of Mother Teresa. Mother Teresa of Calcutta was the last major religion-themed comic by Marvel.

== See also ==
- Toni Pagot, author of the graphic novel Pope John Paul II
- Werner Maresta, illustrator of The Life of Pope John Paul II in Comics
- X-Men: God Loves, Man Kills, 1982 Marvel Comics graphic novel
- Battle Pope, comic book
