= The Comic Book Greats =

- Genre: Interview
- Created by: Stan Lee
- Directed by: Rick Stawinski
- Starring: Stan Lee
- Composers: Rick and Rob Stawinski
- Country of origin: United States
- Original language: English
- No. of episodes: 13

Production
- Executive producers: Peter Bierstedt, Stan Lee, Michael R. Rielly
- Producer: Paul Burke
- Production location: Los Angeles
- Cinematography: Dennis Weiler, Dave Jenkins
- Editor: Dan Fox
- Production company: Excelsior Productions

Original release
- Release: 1991 – 1992

The Comic Book Greats is a 1991 documentary series produced by Stabur Home Video. The series was hosted by Stan Lee. Stan interviewed a different comic book artist for each episode. The artists interviewed include Todd McFarlane, Rob Liefeld, Jim Lee, Whilce Portacio, Sergio Aragonés, Chris Claremont, Bob Kane, John Romita Sr., John Romita Jr. and Will Eisner.

== Episodes ==
No.	Title	Original release date
1	"Todd McFarlane Interview"	1991
2	"Rob Liefeld Interview"	1991
3	"Sergio Aragonés Interview"	1991
4	"Overkill with Todd McFarlane and Rob Liefeld"	1991
Stan Lee challenges Rob Liefeld and Todd McFarlane to design a character in twenty minutes with the name "Over Kill". The character Liefeld and McFarlane came up with became the basis for the character Overt-Kill.
5	"Interview with Harvey Kurtzman and Jack Davis"	1992
6	"How to create a comic book, Interview with Todd McFarlane and Rob Liefeld"	1992
Jim Lee and Whilce Portacio give some tips on creating comics.
7	"Chris Claremont Interview"	1992
Claremont discusses X-Men comics, his creative process, aviation and movie adaptations.
8	"The Romitas"	1992
Interview with John Romita Sr. and John Romita Jr.
9	"Interview with Bob Kane"	1992
10	"Jim Lee Interview"	1992
11	"Will Eisner Interview"	1992
12	"Whilce Portacio Interview"	1992
13	"Compendium of Greatest Moments with artists from Comic Book Greats Series"	1992
The episode features the best moments of Aragonés, Davis, Eisner, Kane, Kurtzman, Lee, Liefeld, McFarlane, Portacio and the Romitas.

== See also ==
- Characters created by Stan Lee
- List of American comics creators
- List of Marvel Comics people
