= Alan Kupperberg =

American comics artist

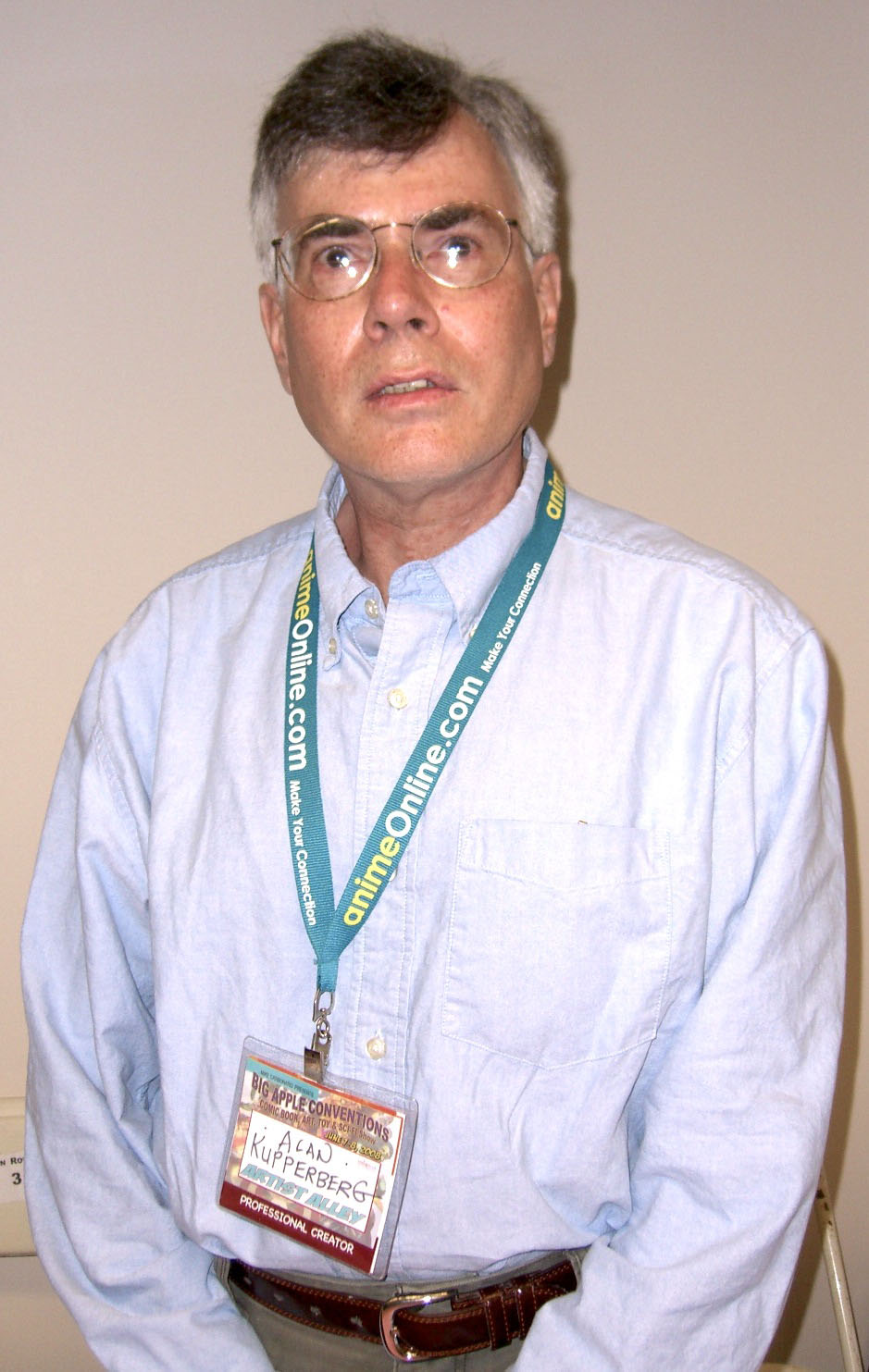
- Alan Kupperberg at the Big Apple Comic Con in Manhattan, June 8, 2008
- Born: May 18, 1953 New York City, U.S.
- Died: July 16, 2015 (aged 62) Rancho Mirage, California, U.S.
- Areas: Writer, Penciller
- Notable works: Obnoxio the Clown; The Invaders; Blue Devil

Alan Kupperberg (/ˈkʌpərbɜːrɡ/; May 18, 1953 – July 16, 2015) was an American comics artist known for working in both comic books and newspaper strips.

== Early life ==
Alan Kupperberg was born on May 18, 1953 in New York City. He graduated from the High School of Art and Design in 1971.

== Career ==
Alan Kupperberg entered the comics industry by working at Neal Adams' Continuity Associates and was a member of the Crusty Bunkers. He began writing and drawing for Marvel Comics in 1974, mostly doing fill-ins and one-shots. He later worked on team books such as The Invaders and The Defenders and drew several issues of What If.

Occasionally working as a writer, Kupperberg created the 1983 one-shot comic Obnoxio the Clown vs. the X-Men, and handled everything from writing and illustrating to lettering. In 1987, Kupperberg worked on both The Spectacular Spider-Man and The Amazing Spider-Man. His work on those titles included The Amazing Spider-Man #289 (June 1987) which featured the Jack O'Lantern (Jason Macendale) becoming the new Hobgoblin as well as The Spectacular Spider-Man Annual #7 (1987) which depicted the honeymoon of Peter Parker and Mary Jane Watson. From 1988 to 1991, Kupperberg drew Spider-Ham back-up stories in Marvel Tales.

For Marvel Custom Comics, he provided art for clients such as Campbell's, the U.S. Department of Energy, the Sylvan Learning Center, and The Dallas Times Herald.

In 1978, Kupperberg and writer Marv Wolfman took over the Howard the Duck weekly newspaper strip. Kupperberg also worked on the short-lived The Incredible Hulk strip and Little Orphan Annie.

From the mid-1980s into the early 1990s, Kupperberg illustrated such DC Comics titles as Justice League of America, The Warlord, The Fury of Firestorm, COPS, Dragonlance, and Blue Devil.

Kupperberg drew illustrations for Archie Comics, National Lampoon, Cracked magazine, Spy, and McClannahan Books.

=== Outside of comics ===
Kupperberg worked on script development and character design for Sullivan Bluth Studios' 1994 animated feature Thumbelina. In 1994, he worked with Nickelodeon on the Tom Terrific animated project.

He also did design work and scripting for numerous advertising and production agencies. His autobiographical strips appeared in Comic Art and in the Streetwise book.

== Personal life ==
Kupperberg's brother, Paul Kupperberg, also works in the comic book field as a writer, editor and executive, primarily at DC Comics.

Alan Kupperberg died of thymus cancer on July 16, 2015.

== Bibliography ==
=== Archie Comics ===
- Fly #3 (1983)
- Mighty Crusaders #11–12 (1985)

=== DC Comics ===
- All-Star Squadron #66 (1987)
- Blue Devil #12–30 (1985–1986)
- Cool World Movie Adaptation #1 (1992)
- COPS #11–12, 14–15 (1989)
- Dragonlance #26, 28–29 (1991)
- The Fury of Firestorm #32–36 (1985)
- Gammarauders #9 (1989)
- House of Mystery #228 (1974)
- Justice League of America #229–232 (1984)
- Starman #42 (1992)
- Super Powers #3 (1984)
- TSR Worlds #1 (1990)
- The Warlord #92 (1985)
- War of the Gods #4 (1991)

=== Defiant Comics ===
- The Good Guys #6 (1994)

=== Marvel Comics ===
- The A-Team #3 (1984)
- The Amazing Spider-Man #221, 285–286, 288–289, Annual #26 (1981–1991)
- Avengers #205, 209, 212 (1981)
- Beavis and Butt-head #21 (1995)
- Bizarre Adventures #34 (1983)
- Captain America #240, 260, 271 (1979–1982)
- Crazy Magazine #17, 19–32, 34, 36–38, 42, 47, 50–51, 54, 63–66, 68–69, 71–72, 74–92 (1976–1982)
- Dazzler #3 (1981)
- Defenders #126–128, 131, 133, 150 (1983–1985)
- Doctor Strange vol. 2 #32 (1978)
- Ghost Rider #61 (1981)
- House II: The Second Story #1 (1987)
- Iceman #1–4 (1984–1985)
- The Incredible Hulk Annual #13 (1984)
- The Invaders #29–30, 32–41 (1978–1979)
- Iron Man #157, 242 (1982–1989)
- Justice #32 (1989)
- Kickers, Inc. #9 (1987)
- King Conan #11 (1982)
- Mark Hazzard: Merc #3–4 (1987)
- Marvel Tales #212, 214–215, 218–219, 223, 227–230, 233, 236–237, 239–240, 242, 247, 250 (Spider-Ham backup feature) (1988–1991)
- Marvel Team-Up #96 (1980)
- Marvel Two-in-One #45–46, 49, 75, 88–90, 95, Annual #5 (1978–1983)
- Master of Kung Fu #113 (1982)
- Masters of the Universe #10 (1987)
- Moon Knight vol. 2 #5 (1985)
- Obnoxio the Clown #1 (1983)
- Psi-Force #27 (1989)
- The Rampaging Hulk #6, 8 (1977–1978)
- Red Sonja vol. 2 #1–2 (1983)
- Robocop #1 (1987)
- Savage Sword of Conan #19 (1977)
- The Spectacular Spider-Man #126–129, Annual #7, 10–11 (1987–1991)
- Spidey Super Stories #43 (1979)
- Spitfire and the Troubleshooters #7–9 (1987)
- Star Wars #53 (1981)
- Team America #5–6, 10 (1982–1983)
- Thor #279, 307, 321–322, 324–328 (1979–1983)
- Transformers #5–6, 43 (1985–1988)
- U.S. 1 #9 (1984)
- Vampire Tales #5 (1974)
- Web of Spider-Man Annual #6–7 (1990–1991)
- What If...? #8–9, 20, 23, 29, 31, 38 (1978–1983)
- What The--?! #13, 24 (1991–1992)

Preceded by Frank Robbins	The Invaders artist 1978–1979	Succeeded by n/a
Preceded by Keith Pollard	Thor artist 1982–1983	Succeeded by Herb Trimpe
Preceded by George Tuska	Justice League of America artist 1984	Succeeded by Chuck Patton
Preceded by Tod Smith	Blue Devil artist 1985–1986	Succeeded by Dan Jurgens
Preceded by Ron Frenz	The Amazing Spider-Man artist 1987	Succeeded by Alex Saviuk
