= Jan Tyranowski =

Polish Roman Catholic

Venerable Jan Leopold Tyranowski
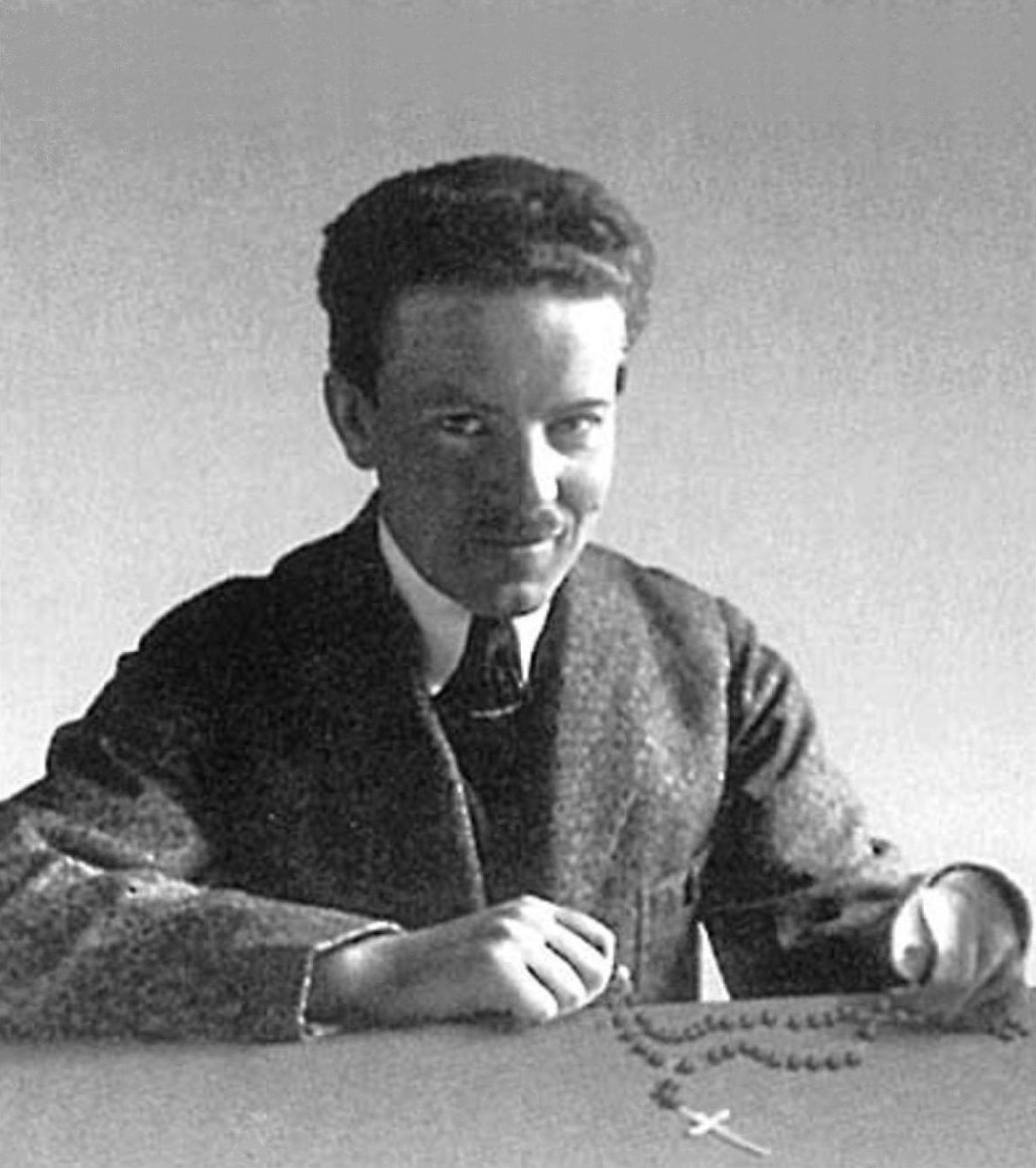
- Photograph c. 1940.
- Born: 9 February 1901; Kraków, Austria-Hungary
- Died: 15 March 1947 (aged 46); Kraków, Poland

Jan Leopold Tyranowski (9 February 1901 – 15 March 1947) was a Polish Roman Catholic. He was an ardent admirer and follower of the Discalced Carmelite charism – but was not of their order – and was a central figure in the spiritual formation of Karol Józef Wojtyła who became Pope John Paul II. He was both the leader and student mentor of his friend's college parish of Saint Stanisław Kostka in the 1940s as well as a small group he ran on the behalf of the Salesians of Don Bosco during the wartime period.

His old friend launched the beatification process on 28 April 1997 and titled him as a Servant of God while the confirmation of his heroic virtue at the beginning of 2017 allowed for Pope Francis to title him as venerable.

== Life ==
Jan Leopold Tyranowski was born on 9 February 1901 in Kraków to Jan Tyranowski and Apolonia Hrobak.

His father had plans for him and directed him to the accounting profession which he studied for. He obtained his high school diploma to enter accounting but this was cut short in 1930 when he suffered from a chronic and debilitating stomach ailment that forced him to quit. He began to work in his father's tailor shop and inherited it after his death; he made this the focus of his life alongside his mother who aided him. When he assumed tailoring his stress reduced and he seemed to become much happier and active in his parish. He liked to be a loner and kept to himself and never married nor had children; he liked taking photos as well as gardening and had an avid interest in science and foreign languages. In 1935 he attended Mass and listened to a sermon a Salesian priest gave that would forever change his life and broaden his spiritual horizons. The priest said in the sermon that "it is not difficult to become a saint". This had a profound impact on his own thinking on what it meant to be a saint and he aspired for personal holiness. He became an ardent admirer and devotee of John of the Cross and Teresa of Ávila after reading their spiritual writings and soon became enthralled with the Carmelite charism despite never joining them as a religious or secular member.

At the end of May 1941, one of the last Salesian priests asked him to assume control of a religious group of men; he accepted this and organized meetings of fifteen teenagers or young adults and called them "Living Rosary" groups. He continued the meetings in his apartment during the war and aided the Salesians whenever possible during the war due to an extensive number of them being apprehended as prisoners. The Gestapo even once discovered one such meeting but dismissed it as the gatherings of a religious fanatic. It was at these meetings that he first met Karol Józef Wojtyła – the future Pope John Paul II – in February or March 1940 during a retreat at the local parish.

Sometime in 1946 he fell ill with pulmonary tuberculosis and suffered great pain over the next several months due to the intensity of the disease that later claimed his life in 1947. He managed to attend Wojtyła's ordination as a priest on 1 November 1946 just a few months before his death. He was first buried at the Rakowicki Cemetery but was exhumed on 26 March 1998 and was buried in the church of Saint Stanisław Kostka that the Salesians of Don Bosco manage in Kraków's district of Dębniki.

=== Relationship with John Paul II ===
The future pope found the man intense to an almost unbearable degree but soon came to see something of profound import in him. Later in life Wojtyła stated: "What he tried to teach us was new. He wanted to pull new listeners to this new life". The future pope went on to state that Tyranowski made the effort to teach them new things that were unknown to them or what people were unwilling to learn and accept. The future pope was also introduced to the writings of the Carmelite John of the Cross after Tyranowski exposed him to it; John of the Cross would come to be one of the great inspirations in the life of Wojtyla.

He was one of those unknown saints, hidden amid the others like a marvelous light at the bottom of life, at a depth where night usually reigns. He disclosed to me the riches of his inner life, of his mystical life. In his words, in his spirituality and in the example of a life given to God alone, he represented a new world that I did not yet know. I saw the beauty of a soul opened up by grace.

Mieczyslaw Malinski – a friend of Wojtyła's and a member of Tyranowski's group who later became a priest was also skeptical at first about this religious eccentric but came to accept Tyranowski's teachings as something deep and insightful. Malinski stated later that "Jan's influence with [Karol] was gigantic. I can safely say that if it wasn't for him neither Wojtyla nor I would have become priests".

Wojtyla wrote in May 1949:

This man was not a fiction or a symbol, but a real living person. His name was Tyranowski. Jan Tyranowski. He lived in Kraków, in Debniki, at 15 Rozana Street. He was born in 1900 and died in March 1947 ... His family was of a typical suburban middle class ... It is worth noting that Jan’s demeanor, for example, the way he wore his watch, his expressions, all of the many details that reflect the social environment, were totally consistent with that environment. The entire difference was hidden within, and it was from within that all his external habits obtained their particular character. Jan guided his inner life according to the book "Mistyka" by Father Semenenko. Later, however, Saint John of the Cross and Saint Theresa of Jesus became his chief spiritual masters. They were not only his masters, they led him to discover himself, they explained and justified his own life.

== Beatification process ==
The Salesians of Don Bosco – whom he aided during World War II – took charge of the cause for beatification. His old friend John Paul II started the beatification cause on 28 April 1997 after the Congregation for the Causes of Saints issued the nihil obstat and titled him as a Servant of God.

The theologians met and approved the dossier's contents on 15 September 2015 as did the cardinal and bishop members of the Congregation on 17 January 2017. The confirmation of his life of heroic virtue allowed for Pope Francis to title him as venerable on 20 January 2017. The postulator for the cause is the Salesian priest Pierluigi Cameroni SDB, while the previous postulator was the Salesian bishop Enrico dal Covolo.
