= Marvel Tales (comics) =

Comic book series

- Marvel Tales Annual #1 (1964). Cover art by Jack Kirby & Frank Giacoia, except Spider-Man, by Steve Ditko.

Publication information
- Publisher: Marvel Comics
- Schedule: Annual: #1–2; Bi-monthly: #3–64; Monthly: #65–291
- Format: Ongoing
- Genre: Superhero
- Publication date: 1964–Nov. 1994
- No. of issues: 291
- Main character(s): Spider-Man, various

Marvel Tales is the title of an American comic book series published by Marvel Comics from 1964 to 1994 and a flip magazine series published Marvel Comics from August 2005 to February 2007. Both series primarily reprinted Spider-Man stories.

== Marvel Tales Annual ==
In the 1960s, during the Silver Age of Comics, the series Marvel Tales began as a summer special, Marvel Tales Annual, for its first two issues (1964–1965). Like typical annuals of the time, these were 25¢ "giants", relative to the typical 12¢ comics of the time. In 1966, the series became a bimonthly and later monthly reprint title, featuring Spider-Man stories primarily, from #3–291 (July 1966 – Nov. 1994).

The first annual was a 72-page reprint anthology that gathered superhero origin stories from the previous two years, as well as a war comics story. An introduction to the Marvel Universe of the time, it contained complete debut stories of Spider-Man, Ant-Man, Iron Man, and Thor, and excerpts of the first appearances of the Hulk, Giant-Man, the red-and-gold-armor version of Iron Man, and the World War II group Sgt. Fury and his Howling Commandos. It also contained a two-page photo gallery of many of the staff and freelancers, including Dick Ayers, Stan Lee, Don Heck, Jack Kirby, Joe Orlando, Paul Reinman, Sam Rosen, Artie Simek, Flo Steinberg, Chic Stone, Vince Colletta, Nancy Murphy of the subscription department, and college "campus representative" Debby Ackerman, and publisher Martin Goodman. Spider-Man co-creator Steve Ditko was conspicuously absent from the staff photos, which historians later cited as evidence of him starting to distance himself from Marvel. Comics historian Nick Caputo has noted that "By 1964 the new heroes were an essential part of Marvel's line, with only the western and teen-romance strips remaining. The Marvel Tales Annual was an easy way to introduce their top features to a growing audience." He also observed that "Marvel Tales Annual # 1 represents an era that is almost inconceivable today, when access to old stories and comics in the form of expensive hardcover editions or trade paperbacks is the standard. To many kids the presence of an over-sized comic book on the racks in the spring and summer months represented an adventure of near-mythic proportions."

The second annual similarly reprinted The X-Men #1 and The Avengers #1, the eight-page origin of Doctor Strange, a non-debut story starring the Hulk, and a standalone, five-page science-fiction story, "A Monster Among Us", from Amazing Adult Fantasy #8.

== Ongoing series ==
Beginning with issue #3 (July 1966), the title was published bimonthly, continuing in the 25¢-giant format through #33. Through issue #12, Marvel Tales reprinted some of the earliest issues of The Amazing Spider-Man, as well as some of the earliest stories of Thor, Ant-Man, and Fantastic Four member the Human Torch from his solo feature in Strange Tales.

The Ant-Man stories were replaced after a few issues by anthological science-fiction stories framed as "Tales of the Wasp", introduced by Ant-Man's female partner. These in turn were replaced by 1950s Atlas Comics reprints of the superhero Marvel Boy in issues #13–16. That was dropped with #17, when 18-page Thor reprints replaced the earlier 13-page Thor reprints.

Marvel Tales was revamped to feature two Spider-Man reprints and one Doctor Strange reprint in issues #28–31 — with the exception of #30, where the Strange backup was replaced by an original story featuring the X-Men member Angel, written by Superman co-creator Jerry Siegel in one of his rare Marvel outings. An Iron Man story served as backup in #32, after which Marvel Tales became a standard-priced series reprinting a single Spider-Man story each issue, occasionally with a new or reprinted backup story. Issue #100 (Feb. 1979) included a new Hawkeye and the Two-Gun Kid story.

The reprints had minor details and cultural references changed in the stories to contemporary ones. Storytelling errors in the original stories were occasionally corrected. Marvel Comics writer and editor Tom DeFalco stated in a 2016 interview that "One reviewer at the time was so incensed with some of my changes that she suggested that someone should bring a gun to a convention and 'blow me away'." DeFalco considered legal action against the reviewer and her publisher as a result. In addition to changing topical references, Marvel decided to alter the background characters in several issues to present greater racial diversity in the stories. Comics historian Brian Cronin remarked in 2018 that "it was an interesting change to make New York City seem more like the real New York City." Marvel Tales #159 (Jan. 1984) included a parody page which reimagined Spider-Man's Aunt May as a jogger and his high school classmates as punk rockers. The alterations to the reprinted stories ended with this issue. Filmmaker Bob DeNatale, who was the assistant editor on Marvel Tales at the time explained in a 2018 interview that "I always hated the updated cultural references in the reprints. When I was hired, Danny [Fingeroth] basically put me in charge of the Marvel Tales reprints so he could spend his time and energy on the new stories, so I stopped making any changes to the original script.

Although the series was a reprint title, it often featured new covers, most notably by artist Todd McFarlane on issues #223–239. Marvel Tales was cancelled with issue #291 (Nov. 1994).

== Marvel Tales Flip Magazine ==
Marvel published a flip magazine titled Marvel Tales Flip Magazine (Aug. 2005 – Feb. 2007) reprinting Spider-Man stories from The Amazing Spider-Man (vol. 2) on one side, and, on the other, Araña, from Amazing Fantasy (vol. 2) through issue #6, and the Runaways through the final issue, #18.

== See also ==
- List of defunct American periodicals
