= Big Apple Comix =

Independent comic publisher

- Big Apple Comix (Sept. 1975), cover art by Wally Wood.

Publication information
- Publisher: Big Apple Productions
- Publication date: September 1975
- No. of issues: 1
- Editor: Flo Steinberg

Big Apple Comix is an early independent comic book published by Flo Steinberg in 1975. A historically important link between underground comix and what would later be called alternative comics, this 36-page, 6 3/4" × 9 3/4" hybrid with glossy color covers and black-and-white interiors contains 11 sometimes sexually frank stories by such mainstream creators as Neal Adams, Archie Goodwin, Denny O'Neil, Herb Trimpe, Al Williamson, and Wally Wood. The creators were mainly friends of Steinberg, working for a low page rate. Most of its stories revolve around New York City (colloquially known as the Big Apple) during a particularly low ebb in the city's finances, crime situation, race relations, and infrastructure.

== Publication history ==
The one-shot comic book was among a handful of 1960s-1970s precursors of the independently produced comics that first proliferated with the 1980s rise of "direct market" comic-book stores. Other such early links between underground comix and modern independents include Mike Friedrich's Star*Reach and Wood's own witzend. Critic Ken Jones, in a 1986 retrospective review, suggested that Big Apple Comix and Mark Evanier's High Adventure may have been "the first true alternative comics".

The comic featured writer-editor Goodwin displaying his cartoonist abilities; Adams and a fledgling Larry Hama sharing vertically split pages to parallel a street prostitute with a corporate secretary using sex to further her career; and Wood's story "My Word", a bitter parody of the Al Feldstein-scripted "My World" that Wood illustrated in EC Comics' Weird Science #22 (Dec. 1953). Linda Fite and John Verpoorten handled production work for the comic, released with an indicia date of September 1975.

Steinberg printed 20,000 copies. Warren Publishing, for which she ran its mail-order Captain Company division, allowed her to store inventory in the company's storage space. She recalled in 1984 that, "I did make my expenses and a little besides". Afterward, the men's magazine Cheri and the French magazine L'Echo each reprinted "My Word" and "Over & Under", with Steinberg passing along the reprint fees to the creators.

== Contents ==
- Front cover by Wally Wood
- Foreword by Denny O'Neil (writer), Michele Robinson Brand (tentatively identified as artist)
- "The Man Without A City" by Stu Schwartzberg (writer), Marie Severin (artist), pp. 3–5
- "Peep Shows" by Archie Goodwin (writer-artist), pp. 6–7
- "My Word" by Wally Wood (writer-artist), pp. 6–8
- "Can You Spot the New York Air Breather?" (no writer or illustrator credited), p. 11
- "The Tube" by Wally Wood (writer), Al Williamson (artist), pp. 12–14
- "A Nice Place To Visit, but..." by Linda Fite, p. 15
- "Over & Under" by Neal Adams (artist, "Over"), Larry Hama (penciler, "Under") and Ralph Reese (inker "Under"); writer(s) uncertain, pp. 16–20
- "New York City: The Future" by Paul Kirchner, p. 21
- "The Battery's Down" by Alan Weiss, Howard Weiss, pp. 22–26
- "Lotsa Yox" by Herb Trimpe (pencils) and Wally Wood (inker), pp. 27–28
- "The Silent Minority" by Mike Ploog, pp. 29–30
- "Token" by Herb Trimpe p. 31-34
- "Backword" by Flo Steinberg
- Back cover by Ralph Reese
