= Marvel Tales =

Marvel Tales may refer to:

== Comics ==
- Marvel Tales (1949–1957), American comic-book series published by Atlas Comics; formerly Marvel Mystery Comics
- Marvel Tales (1964–1994), American comic-book series published by Marvel Comics
- Marvel Tales (2005–2007), American comic flip-magazine series published by Marvel Comics

== Magazines ==
- Marvel Tales (1934 magazine), American semi-professional science fiction magazine
- Marvel Science Stories, pulp magazine titled Marvel Tales for part of its run
