= Obnoxio the Clown =

Marvel Comics character

Obnoxio
- Obnoxio the Clown as depicted in Deadpool: Back in Black volume 1.

Publication information
- Publisher: Marvel Comics
- First appearance: Crazy Magazine #63 (June 1980)
- Created by: Larry Hama

In-story information
- Species: Human clown

Obnoxio the Clown is a character appearing in American comic books published by Marvel Comics as the mascot of the humor magazine Crazy. He was created by Larry Hama.

== Background ==
Larry Hama created Obnoxio immediately after he became the editor of Crazy. He explained, "I thought the old mascot was too 'nebbishy.' I wanted someone proactive, and somebody who actually had a voice, unlike all the other humor magazine mascots." The character's face was modeled after Al Milgrom.

Artist Alan Kupperberg, who would become heavily associated with the character, recounted, "Obnoxio's first appearance was in a one-panel illustration to accompany a subscription ad in Crazy, written by Larry and calling for likenesses of P. T. Barnum and Marcy Tweed among others. This was right up my alley, so I pulled the reference and really went to town, doing a very nice half-tone illo. I think the piece impressed Larry quite a bit, because if my memory is correct, Larry left me strictly alone on anything and everything Obnoxio the Clown-related." Most of the Obnoxio features were written by Virgil Diamond, who according to Hama "was a high school English teacher in Brooklyn. I heard from him a few years ago when he retired. He really labored on those pages and was constantly fussing with them."

Obnoxio the Clown appeared in several single-page gags in What If? #34 (August 1982). Marvel Comics also published a one-shot Obnoxio the Clown (titled Obnoxio the Clown vs. the X-Men on the cover) comic book in April 1983 following Crazy's cancellation. The plot centered on Obnoxio as a villain and unlikely ally of the X-Men. The sole issue of the comic book was written, illustrated, colored, and lettered by Alan Kupperberg.

Long after Obnoxio had disappeared from the spotlight, Marvel published two stories written and drawn by Kupperberg in What The--?! #13 (July 1991) and #24 (December 1992). Obnoxio appears in the Hulk and the Agents of S.M.A.S.H. episode "Fear Itself", voiced by John DiMaggio. Android clones of Obnoxio appear in Spider-Man and the X-Men in Arcade's Revenge.
