= Crazy Magazine =

Satirical humor publication, 1973–1983

- Cover of Crazy Magazine #1 (October 1973)
- Editors: Marv Wolfman (1973–1975); Steve Gerber (1975); Paul Laikin (1976–1980); Larry Hama (1980–1983)
- Categories: Satirical magazine
- Frequency: monthly
- Publisher: Marvel Comics
- First issue: October 1973
- Final issue Number: April 1983; 94, plus a Super Special
- Country: United States
- Language: English

Crazy Magazine is an illustrated satire and humor magazine that was published by Marvel Comics from 1973 to 1983 for a total of 94 regular issues (and a Super Special (Summer 1975)). It was preceded by two standard-format comic book series titled Crazy. The magazine's format followed in the tradition of Mad, Sick, Cracked and National Lampoon.

Many comic book artists and writers contributed to the effort in the early years. These included Stan Lee, Will Eisner, Vaughn Bodé, Frank Kelly Freas, Harvey Kurtzman, Mike Ploog, Basil Wolverton, Marie Severin, Mike Carlin, editor Marv Wolfman and executive editor Roy Thomas. Mainstream writers like Harlan Ellison and Art Buchwald also contributed. Lee Marrs supplied a few pictures. In addition to drawn art, Crazy experimented with fumetti.

== History ==
Marvel Comics (then known as Atlas Comics) first published a Crazy comic book in 1953. It ran for seven issues, through mid-1954, and was focused on popular culture parodies and humor. The second comic title, as Crazy!, ran for three issues in 1973, and reprinted comics parodies from Marvel's late-1960s Not Brand Echh. Later that year, Marvel repurposed the title for a black-and-white comics magazine. Marv Wolfman edited the first ten issues from 1973–1975 and the first Super Special, and created the magazine's first mascot, a short, bug-eyed man in a large black hat and draped in a black cape. Initially unnamed, the mascot was dubbed "The Nebbish" in issue #9 (Feb. 1975) and later "Irving Nebbish". Wolfman recalled, "Stan Lee wanted it to be more Mad/Cracked, where I wanted it more Lampoon. We sort of split the difference."

Steve Gerber, who served as Crazy's editor from issues #11–14, and wanted it to be distinctive from the archetypal Mad, said that the goal was to present work that implied the creators were themselves insane. Gerber's own contributions were often prose stories with a handful of illustrations, such as the "Just Plain Folks" series of bizarre biographies. The last issue of his run as editor included a darkly comic short story he wrote in college, "...And the Birds Hummed Dirges!", about high-school kids who make a suicide pact.

Paul Lamont edited issue #15 (Jan. 1976) and Paul Laikin edited #16–60 and #62 (May 1980). Lamont was a pen name for Laikin.

By 1979, Crazy was struggling in sales. In 1980, the Irving Nebbish mascot was replaced with the belligerent Obnoxio the Clown, who made his first appearance in issue #63 (June 1980), the first regular issue edited by Larry Hama, who had also edited issue #61 (April 1980).

Crazy Magazine's last issue was #94 (April 1983).

In December 2019, Marvel published a one-shot Crazy featuring new material and two variant covers. Mark Paniccia was the editor. This issue was reprinted, along with other superhero-related features from Crazy #9, #20, #22, #28, #31, #39, #42, #57, #59–60, #62–63, #65–66, #68–72, #75–90 and #92–94, in a 248-page trade paperback the following year.

== Recurring features ==
- The Kinetic Kids—two pages flipped back and forth to create an illusion of motion
- Teen Hulk—teenager who becomes a Hulk—like character played for laughs
- Retread Funnies—classic Marvel Comics stories presented with new dialogue
- New Howard the Duck stories—usually one—page gag strips
- The Nebbish—multi—part story featuring Crazy's original mascot as well as Alfred E. Neuman and other humor magazine mascots
- Obnoxio the Clown Fun Pages—double—page puzzle and game parody
- Page O'Stuff—page of unrelated gags and cartoons written and drawn by Mike Carlin
- Evolution and History of Moosekind—history of the world done with moose written and drawn by Bob Foster
- Commercials that Drive You Crazy—TV commercial parodies, usually one page
- Poli—tickles—political comic panels and strips
- Lights On, Nobody: Crazy's Craziest Radio Show—parodies of old–time radio dramas
- Just Plain Folks—fictional biographies
- Kelly's Kockeyed Kanvas—parodies of classic paintings by Kelly Freas
- Comic book parodies—examples include "Kaspar, the Dead Baby", "Ritchie Retch", and "The Brownstones"
- Crazy's Crazies—comic panels and strips usually with a single theme
- The Gleeful Guide to Astrology—reprints from the book by Will Eisner
- Crazy News of the Month—newspaper parody
- Believe It or Else!—Ripley's Believe It or Not! parody
- The Eleventh Hour Special—The Midnight Special (TV series) parody with parody song lyrics
- Fantasy vs. Reality—single page feature
- Dirk McGirk—diary parody by Mike Carlin
- Aunty Nuke—comic story
- Crazy's Gross Encounters—single page comic strip by Dave Manak or Bobby London

== Cultural references ==
The publication was referenced in The Simpsons episode "Separate Vocations". Principal Skinner shows Bart Simpson some of the confiscated contraband in a storeroom at Springfield Elementary School: "Complete collections of Mad, Cracked, and even the occasional issue of Crazy!"

== See also ==
- Mad imitators and variants
