= John Verpoorten =

American comics specialist (1940–1977)

- John Verpoorten, from Marvel Comics photo gallery, Fantastic Four Annual #7 (Nov. 1969)
- Born: 15 May 1940
- Died: 15 December 1977 (aged 37)
- Notable works: Marvel Comics' production manager

John Verpoorten (May 15, 1940 – December 15, 1977) was an American comic book artist and editorial worker best known as Marvel Comics' production manager during the latter part of the Silver Age of Comic Books and afterward, during a seminal period of Marvel's expansion from a small publishing concern to a multinational popular culture corporation.

== Biography ==
After attending New York City, New York's School of Visual Arts, Verpoorten began his career at the Tom Gill Studio for four years.

In 1967, Verpoorten started working for Marvel Comics as an inker. His title was "Art Associate," and at the time he was described as being 6 feet 6 inches tall and 290 pounds (Fantastic Four, April 1967, Bullpen Bulletin). Verpoorten worked on books including Fantastic Four, The Inhumans, and Captain America before becoming Marvel's production manager, coordinating the work of writers, artists, letterers and printers. He held this position for seven years, until his unexpected death in 1977.

In 1975, Verpoorten also helped produce Big Apple Comix, an independent comic book published by former Marvel staffer Flo Steinberg.
