= Kladruby (Strakonice District) =

- Municipality
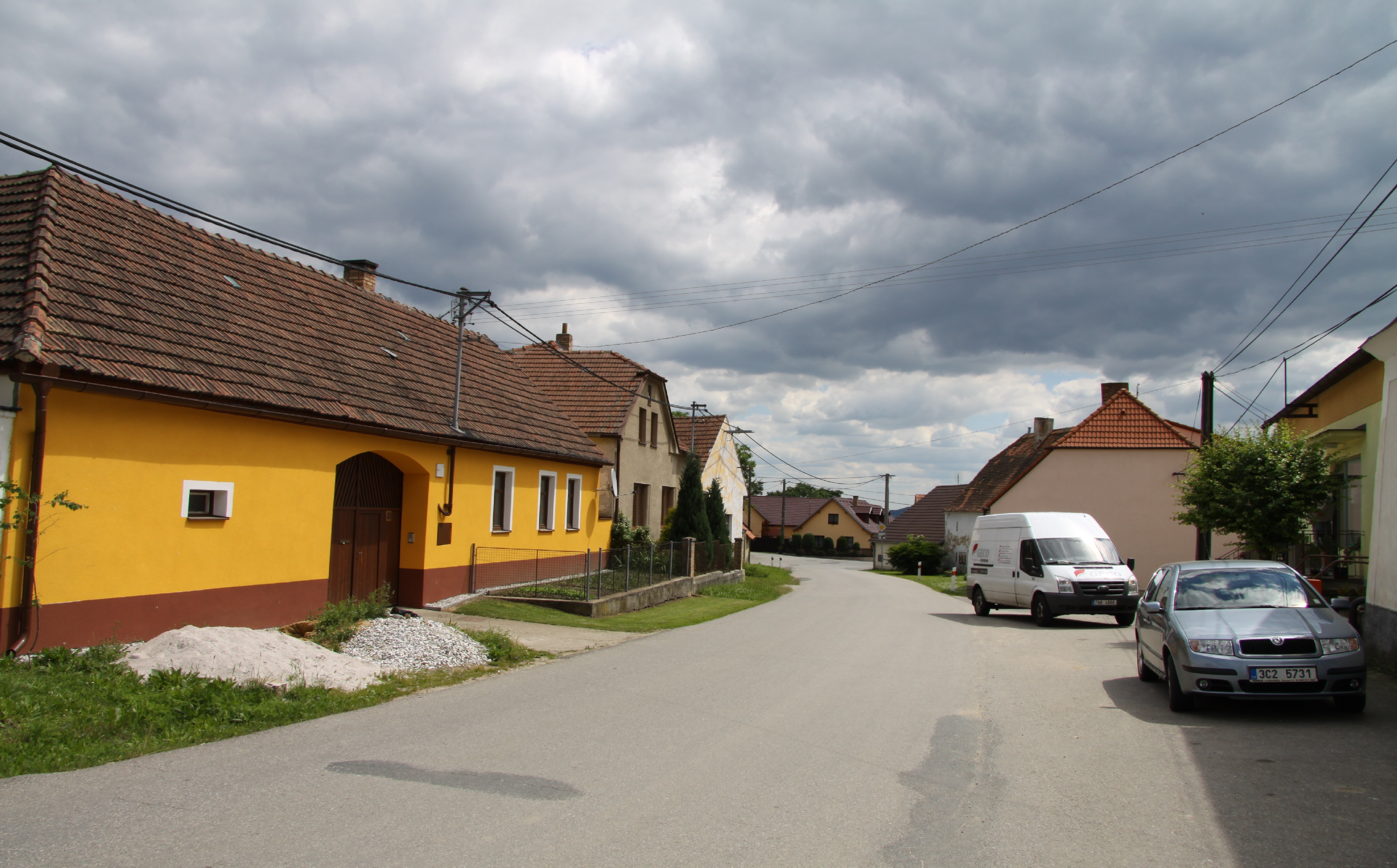
- Main street

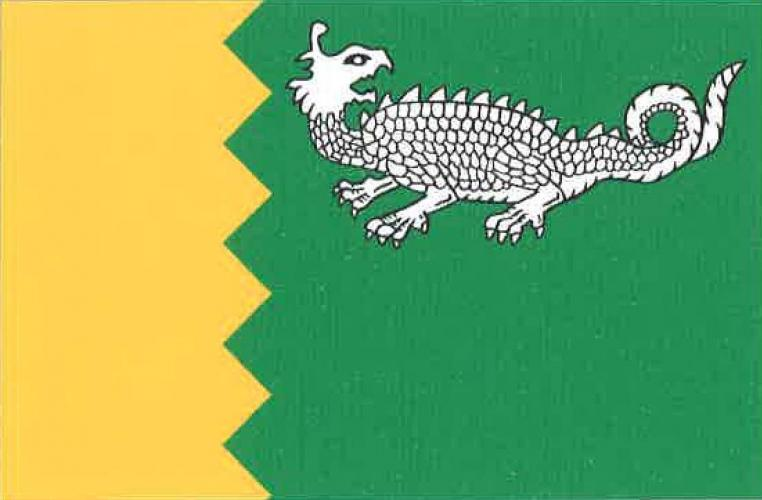
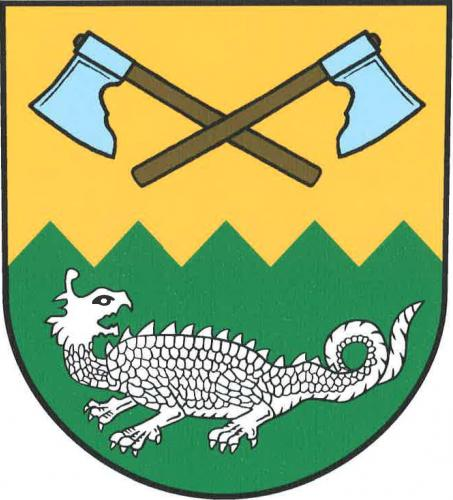
- Flag Coat of arms

- Location in the Czech Republic
- Coordinates: 49°16′8″N 13°45′49″E
- Country: Czech Republic
- Region: South Bohemian
- District: Strakonice
- First mentioned: 1405

Area
  - Total: 4.56 km^{2} (1.76 sq mi)
- Elevation: 460 m (1,510 ft)

Population (2026-01-01)
  - Total: 129
  - Density: 28.3/km^{2} (73.3/sq mi)
- Time zone: UTC+1 (CET)
  - Summer (DST): UTC+2 (CEST)
- Postal code: 387 16
- Website: www.kladruby.info

Kladruby is a municipality and village in Strakonice District in the South Bohemian Region of the Czech Republic. It has about 100 inhabitants.

Kladruby lies approximately 11 kilometres (7 mi) west of Strakonice, 63 km (39 mi) north-west of České Budějovice, and 103 km (64 mi) south-west of Prague.

== Demographics ==
Historical population
Year	Pop.	±%
1869	255	—
1880	300	+17.6%
1890	347	+15.7%
1900	304	−12.4%
1910	302	−0.7%
1921	310	+2.6%
1930	264	−14.8%
1950	227	−14.0%
1961	249	+9.7%
1970	220	−11.6%
1980	169	−23.2%
1991	139	−17.8%
2001	133	−4.3%
2011	139	+4.5%
2021	138	−0.7%
Source: Censuses
