= John Tartaglione =

American comic book artist (1921-2003)

- Tartaglione
- Born: January 14, 1921
- Died: November 12, 2003 (aged 82)
- Areas: Penciller, Inker
- Pseudonyms: John Tartag; Tartag; Tar; Leone; JT
- Notable works: Collaborations with Jim Steranko; The Life of Pope John Paul II

John Tartaglione (January 14, 1921 – November 12, 2003), a.k.a. John Tartag and other pseudonyms, was an American comic book artist best known as a 1950s romance-comics artist; a Marvel Comics inker during the Silver Age of comic books; and the illustrator of the Marvel biographies The Life of Pope John Paul II and Mother Teresa of Calcutta, the first of which sold millions of copies worldwide in several languages.

== Biography ==
=== Early life and career ===
Raised in Brooklyn, New York City, New York, Tartaglione studied at that borough's Pratt Institute, and at the Traphagen School of Fashion in Manhattan.

Comics-creator credits were not routinely given in the early days of comic books, up through the 1960s, making a comprehensive listing of Tartaglione's credits difficult to compile. His first confirmed work as a comic-book inker is the six-page story "The Mad Monk!" in Amazing Detective Cases #6 (May 1951), from Atlas Comics, the 1950s forerunner of Marvel Comics. His first confirmed penciling art is the six-page story "The Man Who Walked The Plank", for the same publisher's Young Men #11 (Oct. 1951). Tartaglione thus began a long association with Marvel that found him penciling suspense, adventure, sports and crime stories, though he was most prolific in romance titles, illustrating more than 120. He signed his work a variety of ways including "Tartag", "Tar", "Leone" and "JT".

=== Silver Age of comic books ===
Tartaglione also freelanced for DC Comics, Charlton Comics and for Gilberton Publications, where he illustrated the Classics Illustrated adaptations Won by the Sword and Tom Brown's Schooldays. From 1963 to 1966, he penciled several Movie Classic adaptations for Dell Comics — from Jason and the Argonauts to Beach Blanket Bingo — as well as TV series tie-in comics (Ben Casey, Burke's Law, The Defenders, Dr. Kildare) and other work, including the presidential biographies John F. Kennedy (inked by Dick Giordano; year n.a.), and Lyndon B. Johnson (1964).

Back at Marvel — where he sometimes went by "John Tartag", with and without a period — the wide-ranging Tartaglione had a long run inking Dick Ayers on Sgt. Fury and His Howling Commandos #27-42 (Feb. 1966 - May 1967) and other issues, plus two annuals. Following this, interspersed with other titles and characters across the Marvel line, Tartaglione spent a year as the regular inker for one of Gene Colan's signature series, Daredevil, embellishing issues #29-35, 37, and 40-41 (June 1967 - June 1968), plus Daredevil Annual #1 (Sept. 1967). His work as a Marvel inker includes three stories with the highly influential penciler Jim Steranko: Writer-artist Steranko's final Nick Fury story, "What Ever Happened to Scorpio?", in the much-reprinted Nick Fury, Agent of S.H.I.E.L.D. #5 (Nov. 1968), and the Arnold Drake-written X-Men #50-51 (Nov.-Dec. 1968).

=== Other comics and commercial art ===
With the exception of an occasional item such as the cover of Dazzler #12, Tartaglione returned to penciling for the first time in years with the 64-page Marvel Comics biography The Life of Pope John Paul II (1982), written by Steven Grant and Mieczyslaw Malinski, and inked by Joe Sinnott. A 1984 follow-up profiled Mother Teresa, with the same artists and writer David Michelinie. Comics historian Mark Evanier wrote that Tartaglione at Marvel "became the 'go-to' guy when a project came along that required historical research and/or spiritual themes. He was therefore the perfect artist when, in 1982, Marvel issued a comic-book biography of Pope John Paul II that through various religious channels sold well into the millions, leading to a follow-up book on Mother Teresa".

During this period, Tartaglione was on staff at Marvel, doing art corrections.

Marginalia includes the Catholic-oriented comic book Treasure Chest, distributed in parochial schools, and religious comics for publisher Ned Pines' Standard/Better/Nedor imprints; inking some Western comics for Skywald Publications' short-lived comic-book line in 1971; and Marvel's adaptation of the movie Dragonslayer (June 1981).

=== Later career ===
By the early 1990s, Tartaglione had retired to Centerport, New York, but he was lured back to the industry by Personality Comics, a local up-and-coming publisher.

Tartaglione's last known comic-book work was inking Ron Randall on the cover and in the 22-page story of Marvel's Wonder Man #29 (Jan. 1994). Tartaglione, who circa 1980 had assisted Alex Kotsky on the newspaper comic strip Apartment 3-G, then turned to inking The Amazing Spider-Man daily comic strip in 2003.

=== Personal life and death ===
Late in his life, Tartaglione suffered from throat cancer, which had left him unable to speak. He died at home in November 2003; the day before his death Tartaglione had mostly finished inking a week of Spider-Man strips. According to family friend and comics creator Billy Tucci, Tartaglione's artist daughter, Mary Beth, "actually finished this week's inks on the Spider-Man strips today and sent them out, closing out his last job."

Aside from his daughter Mary Beth, Tartaglione had a son, John C. Tartaglione, a Centerport painter born in Brooklyn in 1968.
