= Paul Laikin =

American comedy writer

Paul I. Laikin
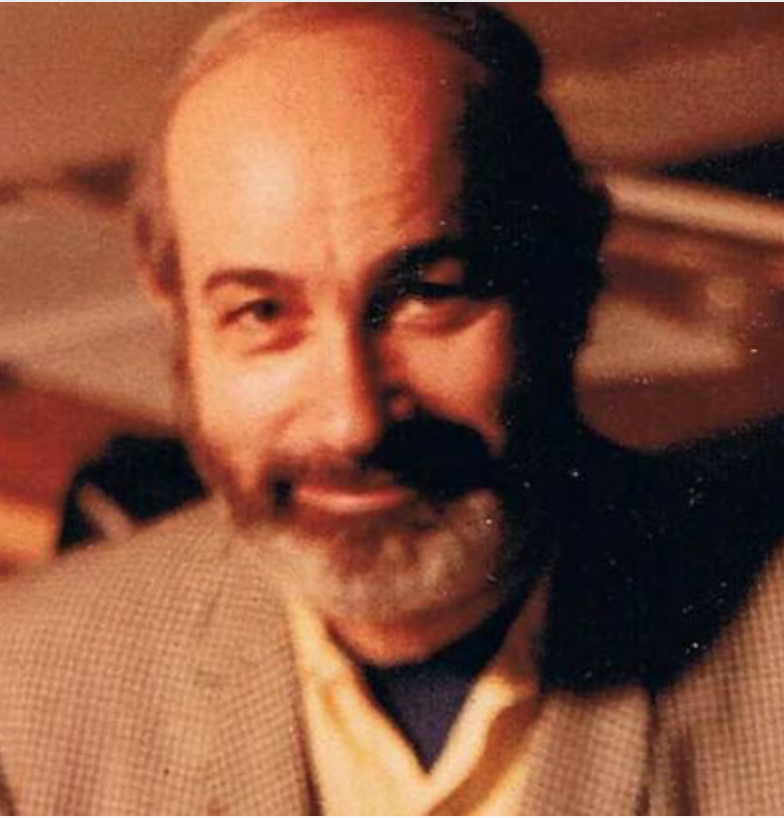
- Born: October 24, 1927
- Died: May 12th, 2012 (aged 84)
- Occupation: American comedy writer-editor

Paul I. Laikin (October 24, 1927 – May 12, 2012) was an American comedy writer-editor for books, television, recordings, trading cards and magazines, including Mad and New York. Satirist Jay Lynch commented, "He was an important figure in the world of whatever that is, that Mad magazine, post-World War II satire thing." Publisher Jim Warren called him "one of the funniest minds in the world."

Born in Brooklyn, Laikin graduated in 1944 from James Madison High School. In 1945, he was drafted into the United States Army and sent to Germany, where he attained the rank of corporal while playing bugle calls for the troops. He was stationed at the former Dachau concentration camp (then a prison for Germans convicted of war crimes).

Returning home in 1947, he studied English at Columbia University and began writing for leading comedians, including Jackie Gleason, Milton Berle, Jan Murray, Ed Wynn and Alan King. In 1957, he started writing for Mad and later contributed to other humor magazines. He replaced Harvey Kurtzman as the editor of Jim Warren's Wildest Westerns magazine. For three years he was the editor of Cracked.

== Television ==
During the 1960s, he was the head writer on several comedy game shows, including The Baby Game, Let's Play Post Office and Reach for the Stars.

== Books ==
In 1962, Laikin teamed with cartoonist Mort Drucker on the highly successful JFK Coloring Book (Kanrom Publishers), which sold 2,500,000 copies, and was one of the earliest titles in the short-lived "adult coloring book" publishing fad of the early 1960s. Laikin and Drucker reunited in the 1980s, producing similarly themed coloring books on Ollie North and Ronald Reagan. Drucker described Laikin as "kind of quiet... He wasn't a forward kind of person, unless you got to know him," noting that he had "a good sense of humor and good knowledge of politics."

Laikin did numerous joke books, including the 101 Jokes paperback series published by Pyramid Books, where Phil Hirsch was vice president from 1955 to 1975.

=== Pyramid collaborations with Phil Hirsch ===
- 101 Hippie Jokes, 1968
- How Sick Can You Get?, 1970
- One Hundred and One Watch Jokes, 1971
- Grab Bag of Humor, 1974
- Vampire Jokes and Cartoons, 1974
- Ghouling Around, 1975
- Athlete's Feat, 1975
- Classic Corny Joke Book, 1975
- Good and Sick, 1974
- Sick of the Crop, 1975

Laikin also contributed to comedy records (LBJ in the Catskills) and Topps trading cards and stickers.

== Personal life ==
In 1961, Laikin married the former Betty Silon, who died in 1967. Paul Laikin never remarried, raising his two children as a single dad in West Babylon, New York. He died in 2012 from non-Hodgkin's lymphoma while in hospice care in Melville, survived by his two children, his brother Harvey Laikin and three granddaughters.
