= Artie Simek =

American comic book letterer (1916–1975)

- Artie Simek c.1964
- Born: Arthur Milton Simek; January 6, 1916 Queens, New York
- Died: February 20, 1975 (aged 59)
- Area: Letterer

Arthur Simek (/ˈsɪmɪk/; January 6, 1916 - February 20, 1975) was an American calligrapher best known as a letterer for Marvel Comics during the period fans and historians call the Silver Age of Comic Books. Along with letterer Sam Rosen, Simek lettered and helped design logos for virtually all Marvel Comics published during the 1960s. Simek's work included such landmarks as The Fantastic Four #1 (Nov. 1961) and Spider-Man's debut in Amazing Fantasy #15 (Aug. 1962).

== Biography ==
Arthur Milton Simek was born on 6 January 1916 in Queens, New York. His father was a furniture polisher from Prague. His mother was born in Kladruby. He began his comics career in the 1940s, although credits are hard to determine, as comic-book letterers did not begin to routinely receive published credit until the early 1960s. Inker Joe Giella — who for two years beginning circa 1946 worked on staff at Marvel Comics 1940s predecessor, Timely Comics — recalled "Artie Simek was on staff on Timely. He lives in Queens and he also used to work out of his bedroom; he had a little drawing table in there. I used to drive to his home and pick up the jobs he'd lettered, then take them home and work on them. Fred Eng lettered there, too".

Simek's first confirmed credits are the 12-page lead story "The Three Super-Sleepers", a Batman-Superman team-up in DC Comics' World's Finest Comics #91 (Dec. 1957), and, for the same company, the eight-page backup story "Batman's Roman Holiday", in Batman #112 (Dec. 1957). He went on to letter issues of such other DC titles as Showcase and House of Secrets.

Beginning with his first confirmed Marvel Comics credits, three Kid Colt stories totaling 18 pages in the Western Kid Colt, Outlaw #83 (March 1959), Simek became, with Sam Rosen, one of Marvel's two primary letterers, hand-drawing the word balloons and sound effects for virtually every comic produced by the company, with Simek lettering most early issues of the flagship series Fantastic Four.

Simek's final work was lettering pages 2–8 and 10 of the 32-page superhero story "Eelar Moves in Mysterious Ways" in Giant-Size Defenders #5 (July 1975), which an editorial note on the letters page describes as the last Simek completed before his death while working on the issue.

== Personal life ==
Future Comic Book Hall of Famer Gene Colan, a Marvel mainstay from 1946 on, described Simek as "a real Norman Rockwell character. Artie Simek could play the spoons. He'd have two spoons in his hand, and he would flip them around, they would bop up against each other, and before you knew it, there was a melody there. He was wonderful".
