= Mieczysław Maliński =

Polish Catholic priest, theologian, and writer

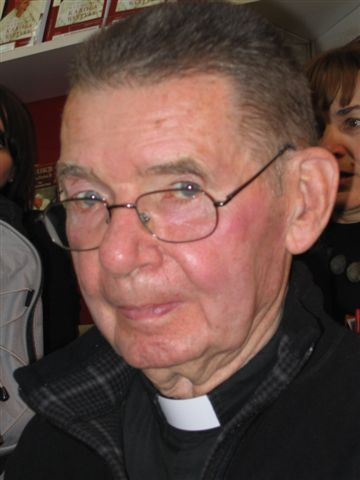
Mieczyslaw Malinski

Mieczysław Maliński (31 October 1923 – 15 January 2017) was a Polish Catholic priest, theologian and writer.

== Biography ==
He was born in Kraków, Poland, and studied for the priesthood alongside the future Pope John Paul II, whose close friend he is said to have been. Maliński studied theology at the Jagellonian University and he was ordained on 24 July 1949. He also completed further studies in Rome, Munich and Münster, producing a successful doctoral thesis on the concept of transcendence in the philosophy of Gabriel Marcel.

Maliński was chaplain to the University of Kraków. He has also written extensively, authoring well in excess of one hundred published works, several of which are devoted to John Paul II. He also maintained his own website. His published works notably include Our Daily Bread, a collection of short spiritual texts and a biography of Pope John Paul II, Pope John Paul II: The Life of My Friend.

In May 2009, Maliński was accused of having informed upon Pope John Paul II to the Polish authorities during the communist regime. Maliński, however, denied the accusations.
