= Linda Fite =

American writer and editor

Linda Fite (Jan 19, 1945) is an American writer and editor who wrote the entire four issue run of the Marvel Comics series The Cat (1972).

== Biography ==
Linda Fite was hired by Marvel as an editorial assistant/production assistant. Though she continually appealed to editor Roy Thomas for writing assignments, from 1968–1971, she was given only short back-up features in The Uncanny X-Men and Rawhide Kid. In 1972, she got her first offer to be a regular writer, on Claws of the Cat, an early and unsuccessful attempt to appeal to female superhero comic readers. Fite was selected because Marvel's editorial staff thought a series targeted toward female readers should have a female creative team.

Fite has said that she found the character unappealing: "I thought, 'A cat? Oh, my God, how original. We’ll have a woman, and we’ll call her Cat, and she can be in catfights.' But I was just happy to have the chance to do it." She infused the series with a woman's liberation tone, but it was cancelled after four issues due to poor sales. She had already completed the never-published fifth issue.

Other stories she wrote included a fill-in issue of Night Nurse. Fite wrote and illustrated a one-page story for an East Coast independent/underground comic published by Flo Steinberg, Big Apple Comix (Sept. 1975).

While serving as an assistant to Marvel editor-in-chief Stan Lee, Fite helped bring fledgling artist Barry Windsor-Smith to the company. After she responded with an encouraging note to the art he had sent to the Marvel offices, Smith and a friend, Steve Parkhouse, flew from England and camped out near the Marvel Comics offices, seeking work.

Fite worked for the Times Herald-Record, a daily newspaper based in Middletown, New York, and was managing editor of the BlueStone Press in Ulster County, New York.

Fite was married to, and then divorced, Marvel Comics artist Herb Trimpe. They had three children together.
