= Jim Novak =

- Born: September 14, 1955 Chicago, Illinois, US
- Died: April 2018 (aged 62)
- Area: Letterer

James R. Novak (September 14, 1955 - April 2018) was an American comic book creator, primarily working as a letterer for Marvel Comics, where he worked on almost every one of their ongoing series, and contributed to the development of the iconic Star Wars logo. He did occasional work as a writer, penciler, and colorist, and also worked at publishers including Dark Horse, Boom! Studios, Image, Dynamite, and IDW.

== Biography ==
Jim Novak was born in Chicago, on September 14, 1955.

He broke into the comics industry in 1975 with Marvel Spotlight #25, as a member of the "third wave" of creators at the company, which included artists John Byrne and Frank Miller, and writers Roger Stern, Jo Duffy, Mark Gruenwald, and Ralph Macchio. He became a staff letterer (and occasional logo designer) at Marvel, ascending to production manager in the mid-1980s. During this time, in advance of the film's release, he redesigned the logo for the company's Star Wars comic, making changes that were incorporated into the version used in the film's marketing.

In the 1980s Novak was the regular letterer for such titles as Avengers (1981–1987) Doctor Strange (1980–1984), Fantastic Four (1980–1984), The Incredible Hulk (1981–1984), and Marvel Fanfare (1982–1991), when he lettered as many as five or six books per month. Fellow letterer Bill Oakley opined that Novak created the best shapes for speech balloons of any letterer he knew. In the 1980s and early 1990s (and even in 2000–2001), Novak was often paired with writer/artist Byrne, on such titles as The Avengers, Fantastic Four, Wolverine, Sensational She-Hulk, and Marvel: The Lost Generation. Over the years, Novak also lettered a number of titles written by Stern, including Captain America, The Avengers, Doctor Strange, Marvel Universe, The Spectacular Spider-Man, and Marvel: The Lost Generation.

In the 1990s, Novak worked on many limited series and one-shots, as well as full-time lettering on Darkhawk, Green Goblin, Fantastic Four again, and Star Trek: Star Fleet Academy.

== Bibliography ==
- Captain America (1979–1982)
- Master of Kung-Fu (1980–1982)
- Doctor Strange (1980–1984)
- Fantastic Four (1980–1984, 1995–1996)
- The Avengers (1981–1987)
- Incredible Hulk (1981–1984)
- Marvel Fanfare (1982–1991)
- Sensational She-Hulk (1989–1992)
- Darkhawk (1994–1995)
- Green Goblin (1995–1996)
- Star Trek: Star Fleet Academy (1996–1998)
