= Flo Steinberg =

American comics promoter and publisher (1939-2017)

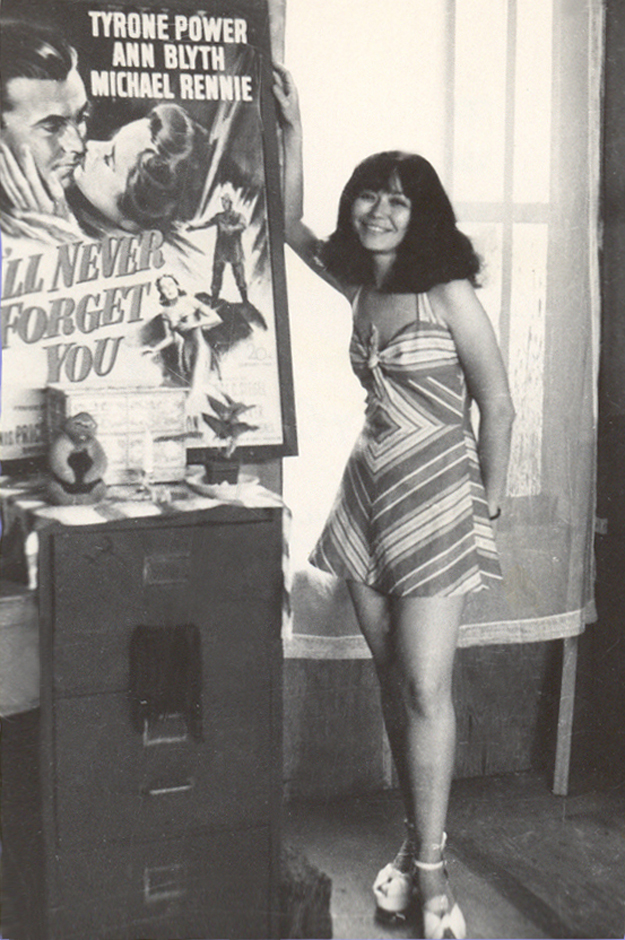
- "Fabulous Flo" Steinberg in 1975
- Born: Florence Steinberg; March 17, 1939 Boston, Massachusetts, U.S.
- Died: July 23, 2017 (aged 78) New York City, U.S.
- Area: Publisher
- Notable works: Big Apple Comix

Florence Steinberg (March 17, 1939 – July 23, 2017) was an American publisher of one of the first independent comic books, the underground/alternative comics hybrid Big Apple Comix, in 1975. Additionally, as the secretary for Marvel Comics editor Stan Lee and the fledgling company's receptionist and fan liaison during the 1960s Silver Age of Comic Books, she was a key participant of and witness to Marvel's expansion from a two-person staff to a pop culture conglomerate.

Steinberg appeared in fictionalized form in Marvel Comics, spoke at comic book conventions and was the subject of a magazine profile.

== Early life ==
The daughter of a taxi-driver father and a public-stenographer mother, Steinberg was born in Boston and raised in that city's Dorchester and Mattapan neighborhoods. Steinberg was Jewish and attended Roxbury Memorial High School for Girls, serving a term as president of the student council. Steinberg majored in History at the University of Massachusetts Amherst, where she was a sister of Sigma Delta Tau sorority and received her B.A. in 1960. In 1962, while working as a service representative for the New England Telephone and Telegraph Company in Boston, she was a volunteer on Ted Kennedy's first senatorial campaign. After moving to New York City in 1963, Steinberg additionally worked in what she said was "a minor way" for Robert F. Kennedy's 1964 senate campaign.

== Career ==
=== Marvel Comics in the Silver Age ===
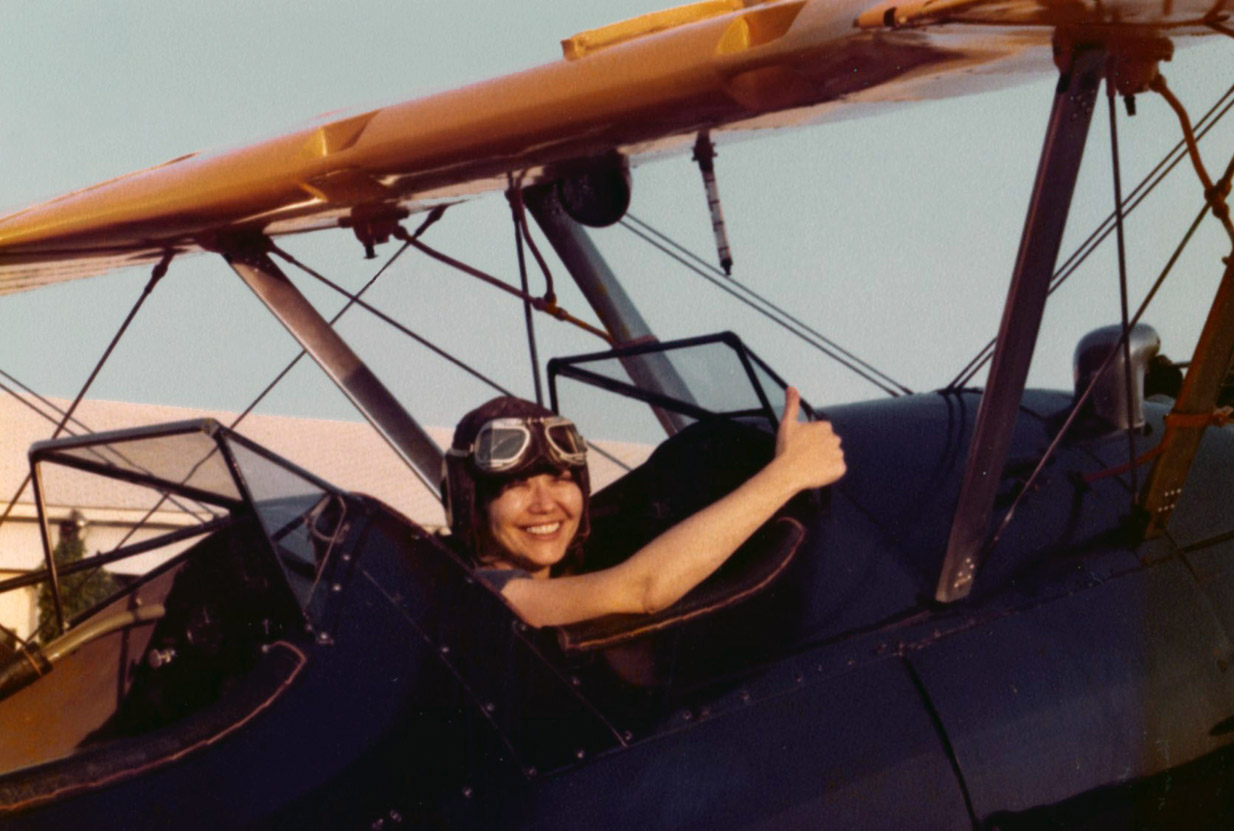
Steinberg in 1980

In March 1963, Steinberg moved to New York City, and in the career-girl fashion of that era spent some months living at a YWCA and job-hunting through employment agencies. "After a couple of interviews, I was sent to this publishing company called Magazine Management," she said in a 2002 interview. "There I met a fellow by the name of Stan Lee, who was looking for what they called then a 'gal Friday' ... Stan had a one-man office on a huge floor of other offices, which housed the many parts of the magazine division ... Magazine Management published Marvel Comics as well as a lot of men's magazines, movie magazines, crossword puzzle books, romance magazines, confession magazines, detective magazines ... Each department took turns, one day a week, covering the switchboard...when the regular operator took her lunch break".

Marvel's only staffers at that time were Lee and Steinberg herself, with the rest of the work handled freelance. De facto production manager Sol Brodsky "would come in and set up an extra little drawing board where he would do the paste-ups and mechanicals for the ads," Steinberg said. She recalled that the "first real Bullpen" — the roomful of artists at drawing boards making corrections, preparing art for printing, and, as envisioned later within Marvel's letter pages and "Bullpen Bulletins", a mythologized clubhouse in which the likes of Lee, Jack Kirby, Steve Ditko, Don Heck and others would be found kibitzing — was created when Marvel moved downtown a few buildings from 655 Madison Avenue to 635 Madison Avenue. "Stan finally had his own office. There was a big space with windows where I was, and Sol Brodsky, now on staff, had his own desk". She said that at the time, "[Y]ou were lucky to make $60 a week starting ... and Stan offered me $65, which was a big incentive to sign on!".

In addition to serving as Lee's secretary, Steinberg coordinated with and cajoled artists to turn their work in by deadline, responded to fans' letters, including sending paying members the Merry Marvel Marching Society fan-club kit, and sending artwork to the Comics Code Authority to be examined in order to carry the industry's self-censorship Comics Code seal. She also had to field uninvited fans who would appear at the office, hoping to meet the comics creators. "[P]eople started coming up to the office. And I would have to go out and see what they wanted. And little kids would try to run by me ... and I would have to trip them. ... Everyone thought that it was nice that the kids were coming up, but at the same time ... this was a business, y'know."

Artist Jim Mooney once recalled,

She was wonderful! You’d go to DC and it was a business-like thing and I'd come out of there and I'd feel, 'Oh, God, I need a drink'. [laughter] I'd go to Marvel and I'd come in and Flo would say, 'Hello, Jim! Oh, I'll call Stan right away! Stan!!! Jim Mooney is here!!!' And I'd think, 'Oh my God, who am I? I'm a celebrity'. [laughter] She was great. It wasn't just me, believe me, it was everybody and anybody, but I still felt, well, it was really just me.

The all-purpose Steinberg — given the sobriquet "Fabulous Flo", in the manner of many other Marvel Comics endearments — said that she

... became so overwhelmed with the fan mail and the Merry Marvel Marching Society fan club that Stan started. There was just so much work! I need extra help and had gotten this wonderful letter from a college girl in Virginia by the name of Linda Fite. She came up and was hired to help me out, though she eventually went on to do writing and production work.

Steinberg became exposed to the underground comix scene after meeting and becoming friends with Trina Robbins, who had come to the Marvel offices to interview Lee for the Los Angeles Free Press underground newspaper. Through her, Steinberg became acquainted with contributors to the New York City underground paper the East Village Other, and met underground cartoonists.

Journalist Robin Green, who succeeded Steinberg at Marvel in 1968, wrote in Rolling Stone:

It was three years ago that I went to work at Marvel Comics. I replaced Flo, whose place I really couldn't take. Fabulous Flo Steinberg, as she was known to her public, was as much an institution in Marvel's Second Golden Age as Editor Stan (The Man) Lee himself. She joined Marvel just after Stan had revolutionized the comic industry by giving his characters dimension, character, and personality, and just as Marvel was catching on big.

=== Later career ===
Editor-publisher Steinberg's Big Apple Comix (Sept. 1975). Cover art by Wally Wood.

Steinberg left Marvel in 1968. "I was just tired. The last years were so long because the fan mail was overwhelming. Bags of it would come in, and all the letters had to be acknowledged". The position itself, even after five years, was not particularly well-paid, and Steinberg quit after not receiving a $5 raise. Recalling the day of Steinberg's going-away party, Marie Severin observed in 2002:

I think the stupidest thing Marvel ever did was not give her a raise when she asked for it because she would have been such an asset to have around later because she's so honest and decisive. ... I was thinking, 'What the hell is the problem with these people? She's a personality. She knows what she's doing. She handles the fans right. She's loyal to the company. Why the hell won't they give her a decent raise? Dummies.'

A "Marvel Bullpen Bulletins" page in Marvel comics cover-dated February 1969 and necessarily written two to three months earlier noted that Steinberg "has a great new job at Rockefeller Center". Working for the trade group the American Petroleum Institute, she edited pamphlets and technical manuals for 2 1/2 years, leaving when the organization relocated to Washington, D.C. By this time she had become friends with New York City underground comix cartoonists including Trina Robbins, Kim Deitch, Michelle Brand and Roger Brand. After those artists moved to San Francisco, the center of the underground comix scene, Steinberg in the latter half of 1970 moved there as well. She befriended cartoonists including Art Spiegelman and worked for Gary Arlington's San Francisco Comic Book Company before leaving the city after a year. Steinberg moved back to her family in Boston for a short while and then returned to New York City. There, she recalled in 1984, her Marvel-artist friend Herb Trimpe "had a studio in the upper 80s [of Manhattan] that he wasn't using so I stayed there and went job hunting." Steinberg found work running Captain Company, the mail-order division of the horror-comics magazine firm Warren Publishing, staying three years.

She spoke at a 1974 New York Comic Art Convention panel on the role of women in comics, alongside Marie Severin, Jean Thomas (sometime-collaborator of then-husband Roy Thomas) and fan representative Irene Vartanoff.

A fictionalized Steinberg was portrayed as part of an alternate-reality Fantastic Four alongside Stan Lee, Jack Kirby, and Sol Brodsky in Marvel Comics' What If #11 (Oct. 1978). Art by Kirby and unspecified inker.

In 1975, Steinberg published Big Apple Comix, a seminal link between underground comix and modern-day independent comics, with contributors including such mainstream talents as Neal Adams, Archie Goodwin, Denny O'Neil, Al Williamson, and Wally Wood. Critic Ken Jones, in a 1986 retrospective review, suggested that Big Apple Comix and Mark Evanier's High Adventure may have been "the first true alternative comics".

As of 1984, she was managing editor of the Manhattan-based Arts Magazine. In the 1990s, Steinberg returned to work for Marvel as a proofreader, and continued in that role at least part-time through 2017.

== Homages ==
A fictionalized Steinberg starred alongside Stan Lee, Jack Kirby, and Sol Brodsky — all transformed into a Marvel Bullpen version of the Fantastic Four — in the alternate-reality comic What If #11 (Oct. 1978). Written and drawn by Kirby, the odd tale featured Steinberg as the character then called the Invisible Girl.

In the alternate universe series Ultimate Fantastic Four #28 (May 2006), writer Mark Millar added a brief tribute to Steinberg. She serves as the secretary to President Thor on an Earth populated almost entirely by superheroes. She warns the Human Torch not to burn the rug, to which he replies, "I know, I know. No need to be such a nag, Miss Steinberg".

== Death ==
Steinberg was 77 when she died in July 2017, from brain aneurysm complications and metastatic lung cancer. In a statement, Marvel eulogised Steinberg as having "… always been the heart of Marvel and a legend in her own right." She was announced to be interred at the Jewish cemetery in Kerhonkson, New York.
