= Sam Rosen (comics) =

American comic book letterer (1922–1992)

- Born: April 4, 1922 New York City, U.S.
- Died: April 8, 1992 (aged 70) Brentwood, New York, U.S.
- Area: Letterer

Sam Rosen (April 4, 1922 - April 8, 1992), often credited as S. Rosen, was an American calligrapher best known as a letterer for Marvel Comics during the period fans and historians call the Silver Age of Comic Books. Along with letterer Artie Simek, Rosen lettered and helped design logos for virtually all Marvel Comics published during the 1960s. Rosen also moonlighted for other companies during this time: he was the (uncredited) letterer for the 1965-66 Archie Comics series The Mighty Crusaders.

== Biography ==
Sam Rosen began his career as a comic book letterer in New York City in 1940, working on writer-artist Will Eisner's The Spirit, the seven-page lead feature in a comic-book style Sunday supplement syndicated to newspapers. During this period, he also worked for Fox Comics and Benjamin W. Sangor studio, a comic book packager.

Credits for Rosen are hard to determine, as comic-book letterers did not begin to routinely receive published credit until the early 1960s. Beginning with his first confirmed Marvel Comics credit, the three-page recap "The Origin of the Hulk" in The Incredible Hulk #3 (Sept. 1962), Rosen became, with Artie Simek and, later, Rosen's brother Joe Rosen, one of Marvel's primary letterers, hand-drawing the word balloons and sound effects for virtually every comic produced by the company, including such flagship titles as The Amazing Spider-Man and Fantastic Four.

In addition to his work for Marvel during the decade of the 1960s, Rosen worked extensively during that period as a letterer for Archie Comics.

Rosen's last known credited comics work to appear is the 20-page story "Two Into One Won't Go" in Captain America #156 (Dec. 1972), which he was unable to complete. Comics historian Nick Caputo reported that Rosen's last published work appeared in 1972, after which he "had a nervous breakdown".
