= 2010 Scream Awards =

2010 USA film awards

5th Scream Awards
- Announced on: October 19, 2010
- Presented on: October 16, 2010
- Produced by: executive producers: Casey Patterson; Michael Levitt; Cindy Levitt; supervising producers: Greg Stills; producers: Gary Tellalian; Austin Reading; coordinating producers: Cheryl Teetzel-Moore; talent producers: Robin Reinhardt Locke; Amanda Ahmad
- Directed by: Hamish Hamilton
- Organized by: writers: David Wild; Brent Bradshaw; Patrick J. Doody; Xaque Gruber; Lauren Nolan Sills; Gary Tellalain; Chris Valenciano; executive in charge of production: Jim "Mo" Moroney; Production Designer: Ray Winkler
- Official website: www.spike.com

Highlights
- Most awards: Inception
- Most nominations: Inception

Television coverage
- Network: Spike TV
- Duration: 2 hours

Billed as Scream 2010, the 2010 ceremony of the Scream Awards, run by Spike TV, was the fifth annual iteration of the awards. The awards ceremony was held on Saturday, 16 October 2010 at the Greek Theatre in Los Angeles and was broadcast by Spike TV on the following Tuesday (19 October 2010).

The shows original creators, Casey Patterson, Michael Levitt and Cindy Levitt, served as executive producers for the event.

== Performance ==
M.I.A. arrived dressed controversially in a black burqa of her own design with the lyrics from her song XXXO printed for the introductory red carpet. Subsequently, this artist performed Teqkilla, the only musical performance at the event, sporting a yellow sequined blouse, pink sparkly trousers, green shoes and a blue wig. The performance was introduced by Nikki Reed.

== World Premieres ==
Movie Premiers
Content Premiered	Presenters
Paranormal Activity 2	Katie Featherston and Micah Sloat
Super	Rainn Wilson
The Rite	Sir Anthony Hopkins
The Walking Dead	Jon Bernthal, Sarah Wayne Callies and Robert Kirkman
Harry Potter and the Deathly Hallows – Part 1	none
Avatar	James Cameron and Jon Landau
Scream 4	David Arquette, Neve Campbell, Wes Craven and Emma Roberts

== Competitive categories ==
The Scream 2010 nominees were selected by the Advisory Board of Hollywood and Genre Leaders, who also advised on the categories. The advisory board included Tim Burton, John Carpenter, Wes Craven, Neil Gaiman, Damon Lindelof, Eli Roth, Quentin Tarantino, and Joss Whedon etc. All films, television shows, and comics books were eligible for a nomination, if they were released between 16 July 2009 to 16 July 2010, and were representative of the sci-fi, fantasy, horror, and comic books genres.

The winners were chosen by a process of public online voting on the Spike TV website, which closed the day before (Friday, 15 October 2010) the ceremony where the wiiners were announced (Saturday, 16 October 2010). The nominees and winners were as follows:-

Winners and nominees
Award	Recipient	Result
Ultimate Scream (presented by Halle Berry)	Alice in Wonderland	Nominated
Ultimate Scream (presented by Halle Berry)	Avatar	Nominated
Ultimate Scream (presented by Halle Berry)	District 9	Nominated
Ultimate Scream (presented by Halle Berry)	Inception	Won
Ultimate Scream (presented by Halle Berry)	Iron Man 2	Nominated
Ultimate Scream (presented by Halle Berry)	Kick-Ass	Nominated
Ultimate Scream (presented by Halle Berry)	Lost	Nominated
Ultimate Scream (presented by Halle Berry)	True Blood	Nominated
Ultimate Scream (presented by Halle Berry)	The Twilight Saga: Eclipse	Nominated
Ultimate Scream (presented by Halle Berry)	Zombieland	Nominated
Best Science Fiction Movie	Avatar	Nominated
Best Science Fiction Movie	District 9	Nominated
Best Science Fiction Movie	Inception	Won
Best Science Fiction Movie	Iron Man 2	Nominated
Best Science Fiction Movie	Predators	Nominated
Best Science Fiction Movie	The Road	Nominated
Best Fantasy Movie (presented by Rosario Dawson)	Alice in Wonderland	Nominated
Best Fantasy Movie (presented by Rosario Dawson)	The Imaginarium of Doctor Parnassus ^{†}	Nominated
Best Fantasy Movie (presented by Rosario Dawson)	Kick-Ass	Nominated
Best Fantasy Movie (presented by Rosario Dawson)	Toy Story 3	Nominated
Best Fantasy Movie (presented by Rosario Dawson)	The Twilight Saga: Eclipse	Won
Best Fantasy Movie (presented by Rosario Dawson)	Where the Wild Things Are ^{†}	Nominated
Best Horror Movie (presented by Sarah Silverman)	The Crazies ^{†}	Nominated
Best Horror Movie (presented by Sarah Silverman)	A Nightmare on Elm Street	Nominated
Best Horror Movie (presented by Sarah Silverman)	Paranormal Activity	Nominated
Best Horror Movie (presented by Sarah Silverman)	Shutter Island	Nominated
Best Horror Movie (presented by Sarah Silverman)	Thirst ^{†}	Nominated
Best Horror Movie (presented by Sarah Silverman)	Zombieland	Won
Best TV Show (presented by Marilyn Manson)	Dexter	Nominated
Best TV Show (presented by Marilyn Manson)	Doctor Who ^{†}	Nominated
Best TV Show (presented by Marilyn Manson)	Lost	Nominated
Best TV Show (presented by Marilyn Manson)	True Blood	Won
Best TV Show (presented by Marilyn Manson)	V	Nominated
Best Director	Neill Blomkamp, District 9	Nominated
Best Director	Tim Burton, Alice in Wonderland	Nominated
Best Director	James Cameron, Avatar	Won
Best Director	Roland Emmerich, 2012	Nominated
Best Director	Christopher Nolan, Inception	Nominated
Best Director	Martin Scorsese, Shutter Island	Nominated
Best Scream-Play	District 9, written by Neill Blomkamp and Terri Tatchell	Nominated
Best Scream-Play	Inception, written by Christopher Nolan	Nominated
Best Scream-Play	Kick-Ass, written by Matthew Vaughn and Jane Goldman	Nominated
Best Scream-Play	Shutter Island, written by Laeta Kalogridis	Won
Best Scream-Play	Toy Story 3, written by Michael Arndt	Nominated
Best Scream-Play	Zombieland, written by Paul Wernick and Rhett Reese	Nominated
Best Fantasy Actress (presented by Aaron Eckhart)	Cate Blanchett, Robin Hood ^{†}	Nominated
Best Fantasy Actress (presented by Aaron Eckhart)	Lily Cole, The Imaginarium of Doctor Parnassus ^{†}	Nominated
Best Fantasy Actress (presented by Aaron Eckhart)	Chloë Grace Moretz, Kick-Ass	Nominated
Best Fantasy Actress (presented by Aaron Eckhart)	Saoirse Ronan, The Lovely Bones	Nominated
Best Fantasy Actress (presented by Aaron Eckhart)	Kristen Stewart, The Twilight Saga: Eclipse	Won
Best Fantasy Actress (presented by Aaron Eckhart)	Mia Wasikowska, Alice in Wonderland	Nominated
Best Fantasy Actor	Nicolas Cage, Kick-Ass	Nominated
Best Fantasy Actor	Johnny Depp, Alice in Wonderland	Nominated
Best Fantasy Actor	Tom Hanks, Toy Story 3	Nominated
Best Fantasy Actor	Aaron Johnson, Kick-Ass	Nominated
Best Fantasy Actor	Taylor Lautner, The Twilight Saga: Eclipse	Nominated
Best Fantasy Actor	Robert Pattinson, The Twilight Saga: Eclipse	Won
Best Science Fiction Actress	Scarlett Johansson - Iron Man 2	Won
Best Science Fiction Actress	Mila Kunis - The Book of Eli	Nominated
Best Science Fiction Actress	Evangeline Lilly - Lost	Nominated
Best Science Fiction Actress	Elliot Page - Inception	Nominated
Best Science Fiction Actress	Gwyneth Paltrow - Iron Man 2	Nominated
Best Science Fiction Actress	Zoe Saldaña - Avatar	Nominated
Best Science Fiction Actor	Sharlto Copley, District 9	Nominated
Best Science Fiction Actor	Leonardo DiCaprio, Inception	Won
Best Science Fiction Actor	Robert Downey Jr., Iron Man 2	Nominated
Best Science Fiction Actor	Matthew Fox, Lost	Nominated
Best Science Fiction Actor	Josh Holloway, Lost	Nominated
Best Science Fiction Actor	Denzel Washington, The Book of Eli	Nominated
Best Horror Actress (presented by Nina Dobrev, Paul Wesley, and Ian Somerhalder)	Julie Benz, Dexter ^{†}	Nominated
Best Horror Actress (presented by Nina Dobrev, Paul Wesley, and Ian Somerhalder)	Emily Blunt, The Wolfman	Nominated
Best Horror Actress (presented by Nina Dobrev, Paul Wesley, and Ian Somerhalder)	Charlotte Gainsbourg, Antichrist ^{†}	Nominated
Best Horror Actress (presented by Nina Dobrev, Paul Wesley, and Ian Somerhalder)	Milla Jovovich, The Fourth Kind	Nominated
Best Horror Actress (presented by Nina Dobrev, Paul Wesley, and Ian Somerhalder)	Anna Paquin, True Blood	Won
Best Horror Actress (presented by Nina Dobrev, Paul Wesley, and Ian Somerhalder)	Emma Stone, Zombieland	Nominated
Best Horror Actor (presented by Kelly Osbourne and Michael Stephenson)	Leonardo DiCaprio, Shutter Island	Nominated
Best Horror Actor (presented by Kelly Osbourne and Michael Stephenson)	Michael C. Hall, Dexter	Nominated
Best Horror Actor (presented by Kelly Osbourne and Michael Stephenson)	Woody Harrelson - Zombieland	Nominated
Best Horror Actor (presented by Kelly Osbourne and Michael Stephenson)	Stephen Moyer - True Blood	Nominated
Best Horror Actor (presented by Kelly Osbourne and Michael Stephenson)	Timothy Olyphant - The Crazies ^{†}	Nominated
Best Horror Actor (presented by Kelly Osbourne and Michael Stephenson)	Alexander Skarsgård, True Blood	Won
Best Villain (presented by Megan Fox)	Jackie Earle Haley as Freddy Krueger, A Nightmare on Elm Street	Nominated
Best Villain (presented by Megan Fox)	Stephen Lang as Col. Miles Quatrich, Avatar	Nominated
Best Villain (presented by Megan Fox)	Dieter Laser as Dr. Joseph Hieter, The Human Centipede	Nominated
Best Villain (presented by Megan Fox)	John Lithgow as The Trinity Killer, Dexter^{†}	Nominated
Best Villain (presented by Megan Fox)	Terry O'Quinn as John Locke, Smoke MonsterLost	Nominated
Best Villain (presented by Megan Fox)	Mickey Rourke as Ivan Vanko, Iron Man 2	Won
Best Superhero	Iron Man 2 - Robert Downey Jr. as Iron Man	Won
Best Superhero	Kick-Ass - Nicolas Cage as Big Daddy	Nominated
Best Superhero	Kick-Ass - Aaron Johnson as Kick-Ass	Nominated
Best Superhero	Kick-Ass - Chloë Grace Moretz as Hit-Girl	Nominated
Best Superhero	Heroes - Zachary Quinto as Sylar	Nominated
Best Superhero	Smallville - Tom Welling as Clark Kent	Nominated
Best Supporting Actor	Don Cheadle, Iron Man 2	Nominated
Best Supporting Actor	Sir Ben Kingsley, Shutter Island	Nominated
Best Supporting Actor	Joseph Gordon-Levitt, Inception	Won
Best Supporting Actor	Christopher Mintz-Plasse, Kick-Ass	Nominated
Best Supporting Actor	Mark Ruffalo, Shutter Island	Nominated
Best Supporting Actor	Sam Trammell, True Blood	Nominated
Best Supporting Actress	Abigail Breslin - Zombieland	Nominated
Best Supporting Actress	Jennifer Carpenter - Dexter	Nominated
Best Supporting Actress	Marion Cotillard - Inception	Nominated
Best Supporting Actress	Anne Hathaway - Alice in Wonderland	Won
Best Supporting Actress	Yunjin Kim - Lost	Nominated
Best Supporting Actress	Sigourney Weaver - Avatar	Nominated
Breakout Performance - Female	Deborah Ann Woll, True Blood	Nominated
Breakout Performance - Female	Gemma Arterton, Prince of Persia: The Sands of Time	Nominated
Breakout Performance - Female	Morena Baccarin, V	Nominated
Breakout Performance - Female	Lyndsy Fonseca, Kick-Ass	Nominated
Breakout Performance - Female	Chloë Grace Moretz, Kick-Ass	Won
Breakout Performance - Female	Mia Wasikowska, Alice in Wonderland	Nominated
Breakout Performance - Male	Sharlto Copley, District 9	Nominated
Breakout Performance - Male	Andrew Garfield, The Imaginarium of Doctor Parnassus	Nominated
Breakout Performance - Male	Tom Hardy, Inception	Won
Breakout Performance - Male	Aaron Johnson, Kick-Ass	Nominated
Breakout Performance - Male	Xavier Samuel, The Twilight Saga: Eclipse	Nominated
Breakout Performance - Male	Kodi Smit-McPhee, The Road	Nominated
Best Cameo (presented by Sarah Silverman)	Bubo - The Mechanical Owl, Clash of the Titans	Nominated
Best Cameo (presented by Sarah Silverman)	Michael Caine, Inception	Nominated
Best Cameo (presented by Sarah Silverman)	Rosario Dawson, Percy Jackson & the Olympians: The Lightning Thief	Nominated
Best Cameo (presented by Sarah Silverman)	Stan Lee, Iron Man 2	Nominated
Best Cameo (presented by Sarah Silverman)	Bill Murray, Zombieland	Won
Best Ensemble	Inception	Nominated
Best Ensemble	Iron Man 2	Nominated
Best Ensemble	Kick-Ass	Nominated
Best Ensemble	Lost	Nominated
Best Ensemble	True Blood	Nominated
Best Ensemble	Zombieland	Won
Fight Scene of the Year	Aisha vs Clay, The Losers	Nominated
Fight Scene of the Year	Anti-Gravity Hotel Fight, Inception	Won
Fight Scene of the Year	Hit-Girl vs The Drug Dealers, Kick-Ass	Nominated
Fight Scene of the Year	Final Battle: Iron Man and War Machine vs Whiplash and the Drones, Iron Man 2	Nominated
Fight Scene of the Year	Final Battle: Na'vi vs Military, Avatar	Nominated
Fight Scene of the Year	Perseus and the Heroes vs Medusa, Clash of the Titans	Nominated
Holy Sh*t Scene of the Year (presented by Rainn Wilson)	Damon McCready shoots little daughter Mindy in chest, Kick-Ass	Nominated
Holy Sh*t Scene of the Year (presented by Rainn Wilson)	The Destruction of Los Angeles, 2012	Nominated
Holy Sh*t Scene of the Year (presented by Rainn Wilson)	Dren mates with Clive, Splice ^{†}	Nominated
Holy Sh*t Scene of the Year (presented by Rainn Wilson)	Freight train drives through city street, Inception	Nominated
Holy Sh*t Scene of the Year (presented by Rainn Wilson)	Head twisted 180 degrees during sex, True Blood	Won
Holy Sh*t Scene of the Year (presented by Rainn Wilson)	Paris street folds over onto itself, Inception	Nominated
Most Memorable Mutilation (presented by Eli Roth)	Body dissolved by Hydrofluoric Acid (The Needle Trap), Saw VI	Nominated
Most Memorable Mutilation (presented by Eli Roth)	Forced to cut off own flesh and arm (The Pound of flesh Trap), Saw VI	Nominated
Most Memorable Mutilation (presented by Eli Roth)	Heart cut out of chest, cut up into souffle and fed to people (Heart Souffle), True Blood	Nominated
Most Memorable Mutilation (presented by Eli Roth)	Scalping with a Hunting knife, Inglourious Basterds	Nominated
Most Memorable Mutilation (presented by Eli Roth)	Surgically transformed into a human centipede, The Human Centipede (First Sequence)	Won
Most Memorable Mutilation (presented by Eli Roth)	Zombie shot by flare gun, and flaming head used as cigarette lighter, Survival of the Dead ^{†}	Nominated
3-D Top Three (presented by Don Cheadle)	Alice in Wonderland	Nominated
3-D Top Three (presented by Don Cheadle)	Avatar	Won
3-D Top Three (presented by Don Cheadle)	Toy Story 3	Nominated
Best F/X	2012	Nominated
Best F/X	Avatar	Won
Best F/X	District 9	Nominated
Best F/X	Inception	Nominated
Best F/X	Iron Man 2	Nominated
Best F/X	Zombieland	Nominated
Best Television Performance	Matthew Fox - Lost	Won
Best Television Performance	Michael C. Hall - Dexter	Nominated
Best Television Performance	Zachary Quinto - Heroes	Nominated
Best Television Performance	Alexander Skarsgård - True Blood	Nominated
Best Television Performance	Anna Torv - Fringe	Nominated
Best Comic Book or Graphic Novel (presented by Jon Bernthal and Sarah Wayne Callies)	Asterios Polyp ^{†}	Nominated
Best Comic Book or Graphic Novel (presented by Jon Bernthal and Sarah Wayne Callies)	Blackest Night	Nominated
Best Comic Book or Graphic Novel (presented by Jon Bernthal and Sarah Wayne Callies)	The Boys	Nominated
Best Comic Book or Graphic Novel (presented by Jon Bernthal and Sarah Wayne Callies)	Chew	Nominated
Best Comic Book or Graphic Novel (presented by Jon Bernthal and Sarah Wayne Callies)	Parker: The Hunter	Nominated
Best Comic Book or Graphic Novel (presented by Jon Bernthal and Sarah Wayne Callies)	Scalped	Nominated
Best Comic Book or Graphic Novel (presented by Jon Bernthal and Sarah Wayne Callies)	The Walking Dead	Won
Best Comic Book Writer (presented by Chris Hemsworth)	Jason Aaron, Scalped, Wolverine: Weapon X	Nominated
Best Comic Book Writer (presented by Chris Hemsworth)	Darwyn Cooke, Parker: The Hunter	Nominated
Best Comic Book Writer (presented by Chris Hemsworth)	Garth Ennis, The Boys, Battlefield, Crossed	Nominated
Best Comic Book Writer (presented by Chris Hemsworth)	Geoff Johns, Blackest Night, Brightest Day, The Flash, Green Lantern	Won
Best Comic Book Writer (presented by Chris Hemsworth)	Robert Kirkman, The Walking Dead, Invincible, The Astounding Wolf-Man	Nominated
Best Comic Book Writer (presented by Chris Hemsworth)	Mike Mignola, BPRD: 1947, Hellboy In Mexico, Witchfinder: In the Service of Angels	Nominated
Best Comic Book Artist	Charlie Adlard - The Walking Dead	Nominated
Best Comic Book Artist	Darwyn Cooke - Parker: The Hunter	Nominated
Best Comic Book Artist	Fábio Moon - BPRD: 1947, Sugarshock!	Nominated
Best Comic Book Artist	Frank Quitely - Batman and Robin: Batman	Won
Best Comic Book Artist	Jill Thompson - Beasts of Burden	Nominated
Best Comic Book Artist	J.H. Williams III - Detective Comics: Batwoman: Elegy	Nominated
Best Comic Book Movie	Iron Man 2	Nominated
Best Comic Book Movie	Kick-Ass	Won
Best Comic Book Movie	The Losers	Nominated
Best Worst Movie (presented by George Hardy and Michael Stephenson) ^{‡}	Piranha 3-D	Won
Best Independent Movie ^{‡}	Dread	Won
Most Anticipated Movie (presented by Blake Lively) ^{‡}	Breaking Dawn	Nominated
Most Anticipated Movie (presented by Blake Lively) ^{‡}	Harry Potter and the Deathly Hallows	Nominated
Most Anticipated Movie (presented by Blake Lively) ^{‡}	Tron Legacy	Nominated
Most Anticipated Movie (presented by Blake Lively) ^{‡}	Cowboys & Aliens	Nominated
Most Anticipated Movie (presented by Blake Lively) ^{‡}	Green Lantern	Won

† - Award categories in the broadcast, but not listed in the aired list of nominations for those award.
‡ - "Online Write-In" award.

== Special awards ==
The special achievement award recipients were as follows:-

Winners and nominees
Award	Recipient
Comic-Con Icon Award (presented by Aaron Eckhart)	Ray Bradbury
Heroine Award (presented by James Cameron)	Sigourney Weaver
25th Anniversary Award (presented by David Spade)	Back to the Future

To celebrate the 25th Anniversary of Back to the Future, Michael J. Fox and Christopher Lloyd reunited on stage with a DeLorean Car (a reference to the movie's fictional time machine, made from a DeLorean)

== Farewell Tribute ==
A farewell tribute was given for the concluding series of Lost, which a number of the show's cast and producers attended, i.e. Malcolm David Kelley, Henry Ian Cusick, Carlton Cuse, Jorge Garcia, Damon Lindelof, Harold Perrineau, François Chau, and Ian Somerhalder

== See also ==
- Saturn Award
