= Marie Severin =

American comic book artist (1929–2018)

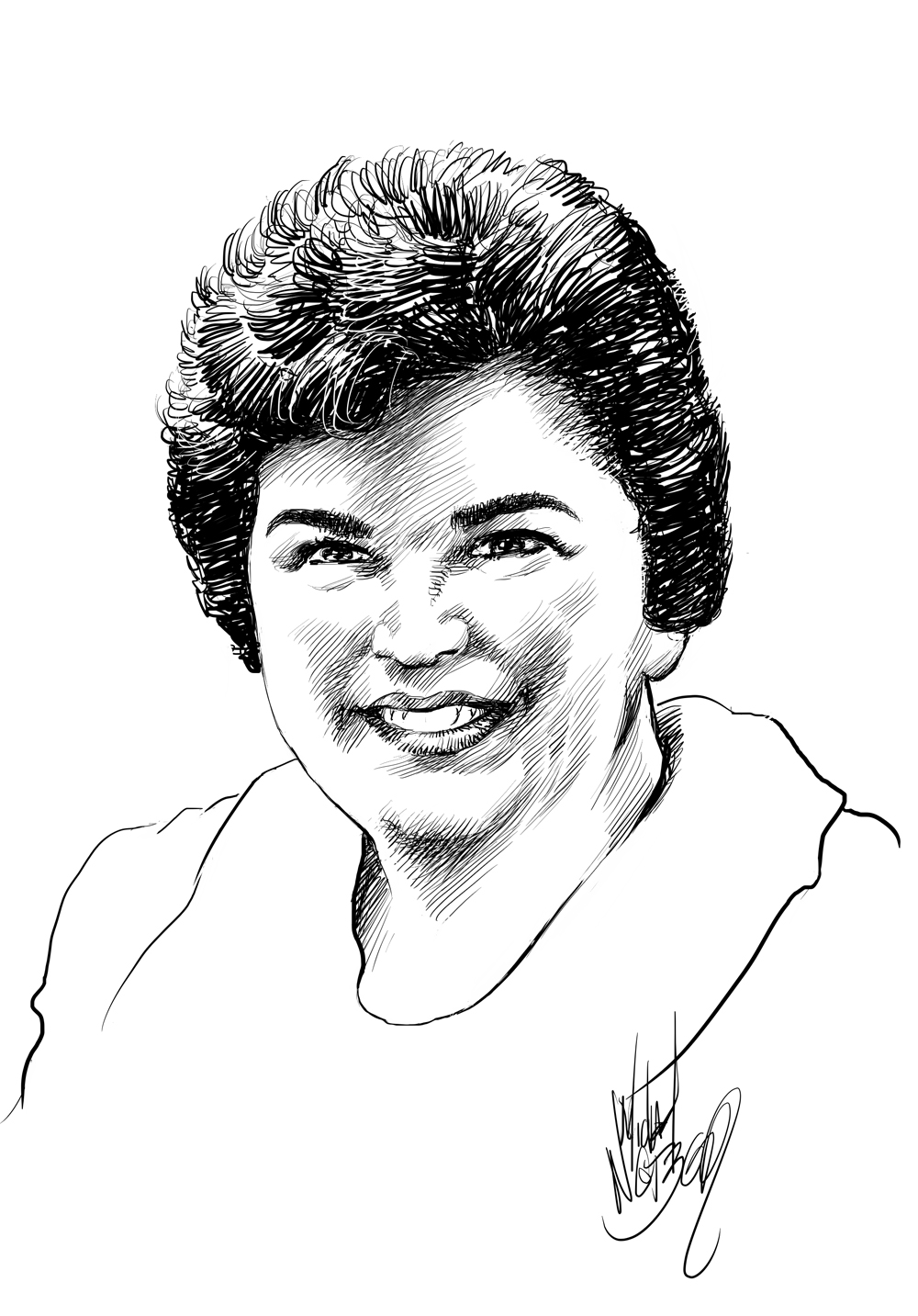
- Marie Severin by Michael Netzer
- Born: August 21, 1929 East Rockaway, New York, U.S.
- Died: August 29, 2018 (aged 89) Massapequa, New York, U.S.
- Areas: Penciller, Inker, Colourist
- Notable works: Doctor Strange; Namor the Sub-Mariner; Hulk; Not Brand Echh
- Awards: 1974 Shazam Award: Best Penciller (Humor Division); Will Eisner Comics Hall of Fame, 2001; 2019 Inkwell Awards Stacey Aragon Special Recognition Award

Marie Severin (/məˈriː ˈsɛvərɪn/; August 21, 1929 – August 29, 2018) was an American comics artist and colorist best known for her work for Marvel Comics and the 1950s' EC Comics. She is an inductee of the Will Eisner Comics Hall of Fame and the Harvey Awards Hall of Fame. She co-created Marvel Comics characters Spider-Woman (Jessica Drew), the Cat (Greer Nelson who later became Tigra), the Living Tribunal and Orka.

== Early life and career ==
Marie Severin was born in East Rockaway, New York, on Long Island, the second and last child of John Edward Severin, born in Oslo, Norway, who immigrated to the United States at age 3, and a mother, Marguerite (Powers) Severin, from Syracuse, New York, whose heritage was Irish. Her older brother, John Severin, was born in late 1921. The family moved to Brooklyn, New York City, when Marie was 4. She attended a Catholic grammar school and then the all-girl Bishop McDonnell Memorial High School. The family lived in an apartment in the Bay Ridge neighborhood at the time; it is uncertain if this was the family's original Brooklyn locale from Severin's childhood or if the family moved to that neighborhood in the interim. Due to the high school's staggered schedule, Severin's class graduated in January 1948, rather than in mid-year as typical.

Severin grew up in an artistic household where her father, a World War I veteran, eventually became a designer for the fashion company Elizabeth Arden during the 1930s. In her teens, Severin took what she recalled as "a couple of months" of cartooning and illustration classes, and attended Pratt Institute in Brooklyn "for one day and said, 'This is a college', and I wanted to draw and make money". Her first job was doing clerical work for an insurance company in downtown Manhattan "for a couple of years" while still living at home. She continued living there after her father died.

Severin was working on Wall Street when her brother John, then an artist for EC Comics, needed a colorist for his work there. Marie Severin's earliest recorded comic-book work is coloring EC Comics' A Moon, a Girl ... Romance #9 (Oct. 1949). In a 2001 interview, she recalled she broke in as a colorist

... for all the war books at EC with [Harvey] Kurtzman. I went on to color all their books, they were happy with it, and I learned a lot about production color and how everything worked. ... I believe the color chart for the printed pages had a range of up to 48 colors. I had the full range; I would mix colors — golds, greens, blues, and so on — and you would intensify them so that the separators could see the difference. ... What they liked is that I really studied which colors looked best and sharper next to one another, the subtleties of it. I would also proofread the colors.

She would contribute coloring across the company's line, including its war comics and its celebrated but notoriously graphic horror comics, and also worked on the comics' production end, as well as "doing little touch ups and stuff" on the art. When EC ceased publication in the wake of the U.S. Senate hearings on the effects of comic books on children and the establishment of the Comics Code, Severin worked briefly for Marvel Comics' 1950s predecessor, Atlas Comics. After an industry downturn circa 1957, she left and found work with the Federal Reserve Bank of New York. She recalled in 2001, "I did a little bit of everything for them—I did television graphics on economics [and] I did a lot of drawing. I did a[n educational] comic book that my brother did the finished art on ... about checks".

=== Blue-panels assertion ===
Frank Jacobs, in his 1972 biography of EC publisher William M. Gaines, wrote, "There was Marie Severin, Gaines's colorist, and a very moral Catholic, who made her feelings known by coloring dark blue any panel she thought was in bad taste. [EC editor Al] Feldstein called her 'the conscience of EC.'"

Severin repeatedly refuted that assertion, which became part of comics lore, while also saying she sometimes used coloring to "kind of shield" some gruesome content, noting,

I would never assume an editorial position. What I would do very often is, if somebody was being dismembered, I would rather color it in yellow because it's garish, and also [so] you could see what was going on. Or red, for the blood element, but not to subdue the artwork. ... I mean, the main reason these people were buying these books was to see somebody's head cut off, y'know? ... And [the editors] trusted me with a lot a stuff. They knew that I wouldn't subdue artwork; I would just kind of shield it a little bit so if a parent picked up the book in the drug store, they wouldn't see that somebody's stomach was all red.

== Silver Age ==
Not Brand Echh #10 (Oct. 1968). Cover art by Marie Severin.

In 1959, when the industry had picked up again during the period fans and historians call the Silver Age of Comic Books, Severin again worked for Marvel Comics in production. Severin recalled in 2001 that when Esquire magazine requested an artist to illustrate a story "on the college drug culture", Marvel production manager Sol Brodsky offered Severin rather than one of the regular artists, who were on deadline. Her illustration for the magazine led Marvel editor-in-chief Stan Lee to assign her the feature "Doctor Strange" in Strange Tales, replacing Bill Everett, who had succeeded character co-creator Steve Ditko. With Lee, Severin co-created the fictional cosmic entity the Living Tribunal in Strange Tales #157 (June 1967). A panel illustrated by Severin for a July 1967 issue that featured both characters was later incorporated into the cover art of Pink Floyd’s sophomore album, A Saucerful of Secrets, released the next year.

Severin was Marvel's head colorist until 1972, at which point she turned most of her coloring duties over to George Roussos so that she could do more penciling assignments. She continued to expand from colorist to do penciling and inking, and occasionally also lettering, on various titles. She drew stories of the Sub-Mariner and the Hulk, and the covers or interiors of titles including Iron Man, Conan the Barbarian, Kull the Conqueror, The Cat, and Daredevil. Additionally, she worked on Marvel's satiric humor magazine Crazy Magazine, as well as the company's self-lampooning comic book, Not Brand Echh.

== Bronze Age ==
In 1976, Severin co-created Spider-Woman, designing her original costume. She co-created Howard the Duck villain Doctor Bong in 1977. Two years later she provided the art for the Spider-Man and the Hulk toilet paper.

In the 1980s, she was assigned to Marvel's Special Projects division, which handled non-comic book licensing. She helped design toy maquettes and film and television tie-ins products, and worked on the short-lived Marvel Books imprint of children's coloring books and sticker books. During this time she also drew the Fraggle Rock and Muppet Babies comics for Marvel's Star Comics imprint, as well as several issues of Spectacular Spider-Man.

== Later career ==
In 1988, Severin returned to Incredible Hulk as inker for several issues. In 1995, she pencilled issues 78 and 79 of Doctor Strange, Sorcerer Supreme.

Starting in 1996, Marie Severin began working for Marvel's rival DC Comics as colorist on Superman Adventures, which she continued until 2002. She also contributed artwork to Fanboy #4 (1996) as well as pencilling and inking stories for the DC anthologies 9-11 (2002) and Batman Black & White HC Volume 2 (2002).

In 1998, Severin penciled the "Impossible Tale" of the "Li'l Soulsearchers" in issue #31 of Claypool Comics' superhero-humor comic Soulsearchers and Company, inked by fellow Silver Age veteran Jim Mooney; and she inked Dave Cockrum's penciling in issue #43 (July 2000).

== Retirement and death ==
Severin retired around 2003, but continued into the mid-2000s to make occasional contributions, such as recoloring many of the comics stories reprinted in the EC-era retrospective books B. Krigstein and B. Krigstein Comics. The former won both the Harvey and Eisner comic-industry awards in 2003. She also inked Richard Howell's pencils on the story "Favor of the Month" in Elvira #144 (April 2005).

On October 11, 2007, Severin suffered a stroke, and was taken to Huntington Hospital, in Huntington on Long Island, to recover and recuperate.

She died in 2018 at the age of 89.

== Personal life ==
Severin never married but she had a wide circle of friends. Her brother John Severin was an artist who worked for EC and Marvel; her niece, Ruth Larenas (d. 2023), was a producer for her nephew John Severin Jr.'s Bubblehead Publishing.

== Awards and honors ==
Severin won the Best Penciller (Humor Division) Shazam Award in 1974. The following year, she was nominated for both Best Inker (Humor Division) and Best Colorist.

Severin spoke at a 1974 New York Comic Art Convention panel on the role of women in comics, alongside Flo Steinberg, Jean Thomas (sometime-collaborator with then-husband Roy Thomas), Linda Fite (writer of The Claws of the Cat) and fan representative Irene Vartanoff. She also participated in the Women of Comics Symposium at the 2006 Paradise Comics Toronto Comicon.

Severin won an Inkpot Award at San Diego Comic-Con in 1988.

She was the first inductee into the Friends of Lulu Women Cartoonists Hall of Fame in 1997. She was inducted into the Will Eisner Comics Hall of Fame in 2001; she and Brenda Starr creator Dale Messick were the first women to be so inducted.

Severin's work was among those included in the Museum of Comic and Cartoon Art exhibition of women comic-book artists, "She Draws Comics", July to November 2006.

In consideration of her contributions to comics, ComicsAlliance listed Severin as one of twelve women cartoonists deserving of lifetime achievement recognition. She received Comic-Con International's Icon Award in 2017.

In 2019, Severin was posthumously awarded the Inkwell Awards Stacey Aragon Special Recognition Award for her lifetime of inking artwork. Severin was also inducted into the Harvey Awards Hall of Fame alongside her brother John, and fellow Mad contributors Will Elder, Jack Davis, and Ben Oda.

== Bibliography ==
=== Atlas Comics ===
- Astonishing #54 (artist) (1956)
- Tales of Justice #55 (artist) (1957)
- Uncanny Tales #54 (artist) (1957)
- World of Mystery #3, 7 (artist) (1956–1957)

=== Claypool Comics ===
- Elvira: Mistress of the Dark #144 (inker) (2005)
- Soulsearchers and Company #31 (penciller), #43 (inker) (1998–2000)

=== DC Comics ===
- 9-11: The World's Finest Comic Book Writers & Artists Tell Stories to Remember, Volume Two (artist/colorist) (2002)
- Batman Black and White vol. 2 HC (artist, among others) (2002)
- Bizarro Comics HC (inker/colorist) (2001)
- Fanboy #4 (artist) (1999)
- L.A.W. (Living Assault Weapons) #6 (colorist) (2000)
- Looney Tunes #100 (artist) (2003)
- Pinky and the Brain #27 (colorist) (1998)
- Supergirl Plus #1 (colorist) (1997)
- Superman Adventures #1–12, 14, 22–38, 40–66 (colorist) (1996–2002)

==== Paradox Press ====
- The Big Book of... Volume 9, 11–14, 17 (artist) (1997–2000)

=== Dark Horse Comics ===
- Harlan Ellison's Dream Corridor Quarterly #1 (colorist) (1996)
- Michael Chabon Presents the Amazing Adventures of the Escapist #5 (artist) (2005)

=== EC Comics ===
- A Moon, a Girl... Romance #9 (colorist) (1949)
- Aces High #1–5 (colorist) (1955)
- Crime SuspenStories #17–20, 22–27 (artist/colorist) (1953–1955)
- Extra! #1–5 (colorist) (1955)
- Frontline Combat #5 (colorist) (1952)
- The Haunt of Fear #1, 14–17 (colorist) (1950–1953)
- Impact #1–5 (colorist) (1955)
- Incredible Science Fiction #30–33 (colorist) (1955–1956)
- Piracy #1–7 (colorist) (1954–1955)
- Shock SuspenStories #6, 9–14, 18 (artist/colorist) (1952–1954)
- Valor #2–3 (colorist) (1955)
- The Vault of Horror #16, 34 (colorist) (1950–1954)
- Weird Fantasy #6–12, 14–16 (colorist) (1951–1952)
- Weird Science-Fantasy #24, 27, 29 (artist/colorist) (1954–1955)

=== Gladstone ===
- Mickey Mouse #219 (colorist) (1986)

=== GT Labs ===
- Dignifying Science OGN (penciller) (1999)

=== Marvel Comics ===
- 2001: A Space Odyssey Marvel Treasury Special #1 (colorist) (1976)
- 2099 Unlimited #1, 3 (colorist), #6 (artist/colorist) (1993–1994)
- Alf #1–18, 20–38, 40–50, Annual #1–3, Holiday Special #1–2, Spring Special #1 (inker/colorist) (1988–1992)
- Amazing Adventures #16 (penciller) (1973)
- Amazing High Adventure #1, 3–4 (colorist) (1984–1986)
- The Amazing Spider-Man #186 (colorist), Annual #5 (penciller) (1968–1978)
- Astonishing Tales #20 (penciller/colorist) (1973)
- The A-Team #1 (plotter/penciller/colorist) (1984)
- Battlestar Galactica #3 (colorist) (1979)
- Bill & Ted's Bogus Journey #1 (inker) (1991)
- Bill & Ted's Excellent Comic Book #4–12 (inker) (1992)
- Captain America #440 (inker) (1995)
- Captain Britain #1–2, 4–7, 10, 15–16 (colorist) (1976–1977)
- Casper #1 (inker) (1995)
- The Cat #1–2 (penciller/colorist) (1972–1973)
- Chamber of Darkness #2 (penciller) (1969)
- Conan the Barbarian #10 (penciller), #69, 72 (colorist) (1971–1977)
- Conan the King #20 (inker) (1984)
- Conan the Reaver GN (colorist) (1987)
- Coneheads #1–4 (inker) (1994)
- Crazy Magazine #11, 69, 75, 78–79 (artist) (1975–1981)
- Creatures on the Loose #10 (colorist) (1971)
- Damage Control vol. 2 #4 (inker) (1990)
- The Deep #1 (colorist) (1977)
- Defenders #53 (colorist), #127 (writer/artist) (1977–1984)
- Doc Savage #4 (penciller) (1976)
- Doctor Strange vol. 2 #20, 31 (colorist) (1976–1978)
- Doctor Strange, Sorcerer Supreme #78–79 (penciller) (1995)
- Droids #1, 6 (colorist) (1986–1987)
- Epic Battles of the Civil War Volume 1–4 (colorist) (1998)
- Epic Illustrated #9, 11, 13 (inker), #12 (letterer), #15–20 (colorist) (1981–1983)
- Ewoks #1–2 (inker/colorist) (1985)
- Fallen Angels #3 (penciller) (1987)
- Fantastic Four #177 (colorist) (1976)
- Fraggle Rock #1–8 (artist/colorist) (1985–1986)
- Francis, Brother of the Universe #1 (inker/colorist) (1980)
- G.I. Joe: A Real American Hero #28 (penciller) (1984)
- Giant-Size Chillers #3 (artist) (1975)
- Heathcliff #53 (penciller/inker) (1990)
- Heroes for Hope Starring the X-Men #1 (colorist) (1985)
- Howard the Duck #7 (colorist) (1976)
- Hugga Bunch #2 (colorist) (1986)
- The Hulk #15 (colorist) (1979)
- Human Fly #1 (colorist) (1977)
- The Incredible Hulk #102–105, Annual #1 (penciller), #190, 354, 358–367 (inker) (1968–1990)
- Invaders #14 (colorist) (1977)
- Iron Fist #13 (colorist) (1977)
- Iron Man #82–83, 85 (inker), #108 (colorist) (1976–1978)
- Kickers, Inc. #2 (colorist) (1986)
- Kid 'n Play #6 (inker) (1992)
- King Arthur and the Knights of Justice #1–3 (inker) (1993–1994)
- Kull the Conqueror #2–10 (penciller) (1971–1973)
- Kull the Conqueror vol. 2 #1, 7, 9 (colorist, also inker for #7) (1982–1985)
- Kull the Destroyer #18, 20–21 (colorist) (1976–1977)
- The Life of Pope John Paul II #1 (colorist) (1983)
- Logan's Run #1, 3 (colorist) (1977)
- Marvel Comics Super Special #1–3, 9, 15, 22–23 (colorist), #20 (penciller/colorist) (1978–1982)
- Marvel Holiday Special #3 (artist) (1994)
- Marvel Premiere #50 (colorist) (1979)
- Marvel Spotlight #12 (colorist) (1973)
- Marvel Super-Heroes vol. 2 #12 (penciller) (1993)
- Marvel Team-Up #74 (inker/colorist) (1978)
- Marvel Treasury Edition #12, 24 (colorist) (1976–1980)
- Marvel Two-in-One #23 (penciller) (1977)
- Midnight Sons Unlimited #6–7 (artist/colorist) (1994)
- Mighty Mouse #1–10 (inker) (1990–1991)
- Misty #1–3 (colorist) (1985–1986)
- Monsters on the Prowl (Kull) #16 (inker) (1972)
- Moon Knight Special #1 (artist/colorist) (1992)
- Ms. Marvel #1 (colorist) (1977)
- Muppet Babies #1, 3–13, 15–16 (artist/colorist) (1985–1987)
- New Warriors Annual #1 (inker) (1991)
- Not Brand Echh #1–9, 11–13 (artist) (1967)
- Nova #6, 11 (colorist) (1977)
- Official Handbook of the Marvel Universe #3, 14 (penciller) (1983–1984)
- Pizzazz #5, 9–13, 15 (Star Wars comic) (colorist) (1978)
- Power Man #35 (penciller) (1976)
- Power Man and Iron Fist #60 (penciller/colorist) (1979)
- Psi-Force #3 (colorist) (1987)
- Punisher 2099 #7–8, 12 (colorist) (1993–1994)
- Rawhide Kid, vol. 2, #1 (colorist) (1985)
- Red Sonja vol. 3 #8 (inker) (1985)
- The Ren & Stimpy Show #9 (inker) (1993)
- Royal Roy #1 (colorist) (1985)
- Sergio Massacres Marvel #1 (inker) (1996)
- The Smurfs #1 (inker) (1982)
- The Spectacular Spider-Man #8 (colorist); #45, 47–48, 51 (penciller), #54 (penciller/colorist), Annual #3, 11 (artist) (1977–1991)
- Spider-Man and the Dallas Cowboys Sunday supplement (writer/penciller) (1983)
- Spider-Man: Christmas in Dallas promotional one-shot (colorist) (1983)
- Spider-Man Magazine #2, 4, 9, 12 (artist/colorist) (1994–1995)
- Spoof #1–5 (1970–1973)
- Star Team promotional one-shot (colorist) (1977)
- Star Trek #13 (inker) (1981)
- Star Wars #1, 17 (colorist) (1977–1978)
- Strange Tales (Doctor Strange) #153–160 (artist) (1967)
- Sub-Mariner #9, 12–19, 21–23, 44–45 (penciller/colorist) (1969–1972)
- Supernatural Thrillers #1 (penciller) (1972)
- Tales of Suspense #73 (colorist) (1966)
- Tales to Astonish (Hulk) #92–101 (penciller) (1967–1968)
- Tarzan #1–2 (colorist) (1977)
- Thor #253, 287 (colorist), 306, 308 (inker) (1976–1981)
- Thundercats #13–16 (colorist) (1987)
- The Tomb of Dracula #58, 60 (colorist) (1977)
- Toxic Crusaders #1, 3, 6–7 (inker) (1992)
- Transformers: Generation 2 #1–4 (inker) (1993–1994)
- Web of Spider-Man #27 (colorist) (1987)
- What If ... ? vol. 2 #17 (inker) (1990)
- What The--?! #1, 16, 18, 21, 25–26 (artist/inker/colorist) (1988–1993)

Preceded by Bill Everett	"Doctor Strange" feature in Strange Tales artist 1967	Succeeded by Dan Adkins
Preceded by John Buscema	Sub-Mariner artist 1969–1970	Succeeded by John Buscema
