= Batman/The Spirit =

2007 one-shot comic book

- Textless cover of Batman/The Spirit, art by Darwyn Cooke.

Publication information
- Publisher: DC Comics
- Format: One-shot
- Publication date: January 2007
- No. of issues: 1
- Main character(s): Batman; The Spirit

Creative team
- Written by: Jeph Loeb
- Penciller: Darwyn Cooke
- Inker: J. Bone
- Letterer: Comicraft
- Colorist: Dave Stewart
- Editor: Mark Chiarello

Collected editions
- Will Eisner's The Spirit Vol. 1: ISBN 1-4012-1461-4

Batman/The Spirit is a 2007 one-shot comic book written by Jeph Loeb with art by Darwyn Cooke and J. Bone. Published by DC Comics, the comic is a crossover between Batman and the Spirit.

== Plot summary ==
When the American Criminologist Association (police officers from Gotham and Central City) holds its annual convention in Hawaii, America's criminals hold a gathering of their own Crime Convention. Batman teams up with the Spirit, and together, put an end to the villains' plan for mayhem and disaster.

== Awards ==
Batman/The Spirit won the 2007 Eisner Award for Best Single Issue. Colorist Dave Stewart won the Eisner for Best Coloring in part for his work on Batman/The Spirit.

Darwyn Cooke won the 2007 Joe Shuster Award for Outstanding Artist for both Batman/The Spirit and his The Spirit ongoing series which followed.

== Collected editions ==
Batman/The Spirit is included in the trade paperback Will Eisner's The Spirit Vol. 1 (ISBN 1401214614).
