= J. Bone =

Canadian comic book artist

- Born: Jason Bone
- Areas: Writer, Artist
- Notable works: Batman: The Brave and the Bold, Super Friends
- Awards: Eisner Award 2023

J. Bone is a Canadian comic book artist and writer who has worked on such titles as DC Comics' Batman: The Brave and the Bold and Super Friends. He was the inker on the one-shot Batman/The Spirit.

== Personal life ==
J. Bone is homosexual. His inspiration for drawing male characters comes mainly from mid-20th century beefcake magazines such as Physique Pictorial and also as part of himself.

== Career ==
J.Bone's first published work was Solar Stella for Sirius Entertainment, for which he was nominated for an Eisner Award 2001 (Talent Deserving of Wider Recognition).

In 2002, Oni published Alison Dare, co-created by J. Torres with art by J.Bone.

He is an Eisner Award winner 2023 in Best Short Story category for “Finding Batman”, written by Kevin Conroy in DC Pride 2022.

== Bibliography ==
- Spider-Man: Tangled Web #11 (Marvel Comics, April 2002). J.Bone inked Darwyn Cooke on "Open All Night!", a Spider-Man Valentine's Day story.
- Spider-Man's Tangled Web #21 (Marvel, February 2003). Co-Plotted (with Darwyn Cooke, who inked) and penciled the Spider-Man Christmas story titled "T'was the Fight Before Xmas", also featuring several female Marvel characters (Crystal, Medusa, The Wasp and The Invisible Woman).
- Wolverine/Doop #1-2 (Marvel, 2003). 2-issue miniseries written by Peter Milligan that co-stars X-Men's Wolverine and X-Force's Doop. Darwyn Cooke pencils with J.Bone inks.
- "The Atomics: Spaced Out & Grounded in Snap City" (Image, 2003). TPB collection of Atomics King-Size Giant Spectacular. J. Bone is featured as a guest artists in the series, written and drawn by Mike Allred.
- Batman/The Spirit (DC Comics, November 2006). One-shot crossover issue between Batman and The Spirit, featuring some of the supporting casts of both characters (Robin, Catwoman, the Joker, Ebony, P’Gell, Commissioner Dolan and more). Co-written by Cooke and Jeph Loeb, and penciled by Cooke with inks by J.Bone.
- The Spirit #1-6, 8-12 (DC Comics, December 2006 to January 2008). Inker and sometimes finishes over Darwyn Cooke pencils.
- Justice League: The New Frontier Special (DC Comics, May 2008). Penciled and inked the Wonder Woman and Black Canary back-up story.
- "Super Friends" (DC Comics, 2008 - 2010). J. Bone provides interior art for issues 9, 15, 18, 24, and 27.
- DC Retroactive: Wonder Woman - The '70s #1 (DC Comics, September 2011)
- The Saviors #1-5 (Image 2013 - ) Although the story arc wraps up in issue 5, we are promised future issues which never materialized.
- The Rocketeer: Hollywood Horror #1–4 (IDW Publishing, 2013)
- "Rocketeer/The Spirit: Pulp Friction" #3-4 (IDW Publishing, 2013). Miniseries written by Mark Waid.
- "The Rocketeer: At War" #3-4 (IDW Publishing, December 2015 - April 2016). Miniseries written by Marc Guggenheim.
- "Finding Batman" (DC Comics, 2022), DC Pride story written by Kevin Conroy

=== Comic book covers ===
- Super Friends #1-29 (DC Comics)
- Billy Batson and the Magic of Shazam! #6 (DC Comics)
- The Legion of Super-Heroes: The Silver Age Omnibus Vol. 1 (DC Comics)

=== Writer ===
- Madman Atomic Comics #14 "It's a Mad, Mad, Mad, Madman Movie" Art by Darwyn Cooke.
