= Toronto Comic Con =

Comic book convention in Toronto, Canada

- Status: Defunct
- Genre: Comic books
- Venue: National Trade Center / Direct Energy Centre (2003–2008, 2010-2011); Metro Toronto Convention Centre (2012)
- Locations: Toronto, Ontario
- Country: Canada
- Inaugurated: 2003
- Founder: Peter Dixon
- Most recent: 2012
- Organizer: Paradise Comics (2003–2008); Wizard Entertainment (2010–2012)
- Filing status: For Profit

The Toronto Comic Con was an annual comic book convention held in Toronto, Ontario, Canada. It started in 2003, organized by local retailer Paradise Comics, and was sold in 2009 to Wizard Entertainment owner Gareb Shamus. It was subsequently relaunched as a Wizard event in 2010. The event has been on hiatus since spring 2012.

From 2003 to 2007 the subtitle for the event was "A Celebration of Comic Books, Graphic Novels, Manga and Sequential Art". During those years the event was scheduled to run over three days (Friday through Sunday). In 2008 the convention was a two-day event (Saturday and Sunday).

== Events ==
Features have included: exhibitor room for commercial selling of related goods, a corporate area for companies to promote their projects, an Artist Alley area for comic book creators, a guest area for invited guests of the convention, panel room for discussions on various aspects of comic books and creators, workshops and children's programming. In previous years the convention was the home to additional special events programming such as Women of Comics Symposium and the Joe Shuster Awards.

== History ==
=== Paradise Comics Toronto Comicon ===
Staff from Paradise Comics, a Toronto comic book store, put on one-day comic book conventions in Toronto starting in the early 1990s.

In November 2003, Peter Dixon, owner of Paradise Comics, held the first official "Paradise Toronto Comicon" — a three-day event emphasizing comic books, graphic novels, manga, and sequential art. Kevin Boyd, who had been co-promoter of the smaller Paradise conventions since 2002, played a key role in organizing and coordinating the show.

As access to the Metro Toronto Convention Centre was reserved for the larger convention Fan Expo Canada, which had been held at that venue since the late 1990s, the first Paradise convention was held at the National Trade Centre (later called the Direct Energy Centre, located at Exhibition Place (home of the historic Canadian National Exhibition). Guests of honor were Jim Starlin and Michael William Kaluta.

The Paradise con stayed in the Exhibition Place venue from 2003 to 2007; hall size varied at that location, and the convention's largest hall rental was Hall C in 2006–7, which is 58,315 square feet (5,417.6 m^{2}). During this period, industry observers noted tensions and competition between the two conventions regarding venue access and scheduling, though no legal action was pursued.

In 2004, the convention was held in mid-June; guests of honor were Will Eisner and Dave Sim.. In 2005 and 2006, it was held in late April. In 2007, it was held in June. On occasion, Paradise also held one-day shows at the Hilton and Holiday Inn on King (now the Toronto Hyatt Regency).

The Paradise Comics Toronto Comicon hosted the Joe Shuster Awards in the years 2005–2007.

In these early years, the Paradise Comic convention was largely volunteer-driven, with Dixon and Boyd overseeing most operations and relying on store staff and a team of 15–25 unpaid volunteers to support the event.

In July 2007, in a controversial move, Paradise Conventions co-owner and organizer Kevin Boyd resigned from the convention to work as the Canadian guest and programming coordinator for Fan Expo Canada and other Toronto ComiCON events. Boyd claimed at the time that, "The convention business was not successful so I decided it was time to end it. I worked on it for five years and did not receive any money for time spent on the big convention."

In 2008, the event moved to the Holiday Inn on King, a smaller venue (21,000 square feet) that was closer to downtown Toronto. It was held in mid-July (July 12–13, 2008). By that time, "the event has been awarded best international comic book convention (non-USA) by ComicBookConventions.com for the last five years."

The show went on hiatus in 2009 event due to scheduling and financial concerns.

=== Wizard World Toronto ===
On June 24, 2009, Gareb Shamus, owner of Wizard Entertainment, announced that he had purchased the event from Paradise owner Peter Dixon, who would remain involved in the show in some form. The formerly comic book-only show was to be retooled as a celebrity-focused, media-oriented multigenre event similar to other Wizard events in Philadelphia, Chicago, and New York, and relaunched as the "Wizard World Toronto" in 2010. Wizard World Toronto continued to be held at Exhibition Place in both 2010 and 2011.

The 2012 Wizard World Toronto Comic Con was held on April 14-15, 2012, at the Metro Toronto Convention Centre, the same venue as Fan Expo Canada (although during a different time period, as Fan Expo was held that year in August). (Commentators noted that Wizard World's events often overlapped temporally or geographically with other shows, including Fan Expo Canada in Toronto and major U.S. conventions such as C2E2 in Chicago, positioning Wizard World Toronto within a network of competitive North American comic conventions.)

Along with many Wizard conventions across North America, the show went on hiatus after 2012.

=== Later developments ===
In June 2014, Paradise Comics launched a series of new semi-monthly one-day shows, called the "Toronto Comics Show," and held them in a room at the Leaside Arena. Those events are also currently on hiatus since Fall 2014.

== Dates and locations ==
- 2003: March 23 — Toronto Hilton Hotel
- 2003: November 7–9 — Queen Elizabeth Building, National Trade Centre
- 2004: June 18–20 — Queen Elizabeth Building, National Trade Centre
- 2005: April 29–30, May 1 — Hall F, National Trade Centre
- 2006: April 28–30 — Hall C, National Trade Centre
- 2007: June 8–10 — Hall C, Direct Energy Centre
- 2008: July 12–13 — 2nd Floor, Holiday Inn on King (Last Paradise event)
- 2009: SHOW ON HIATUS
- 2010: March 26–28 — Hall A, Direct Energy Centre (First Wizard event)
- 2011: March 18–20 — Hall D, Direct Energy Centre
- 2012: April 14–15 — Metro Toronto Convention Center, North Building

== Guests of Honour ==
- 2003 Jim Starlin and Michael William Kaluta
- 2004 Will Eisner and Dave Sim
- 2005 Brian Michael Bendis, Warren Ellis and Jerry Robinson
- 2006 George Pérez and David Lloyd
- 2007 Michael Golden, Terry Moore, Marv Wolfman and Matt Wagner
- 2008 Herb Trimpe, Joseph Michael Linsner, Greg Land
- 2010 NONE (Note: Wizard World conventions generally didn't use "Guest of Honor" terminology. Instead, they promoted a broad mix of celebrities, pop-culture personalities, and comic creators as 'featured guests' or 'headline guests.')
- 2011 NONE
- 2012 Mike Deodato
