= Darwyn Cooke =

Canadian cartoonist (1962–2016)

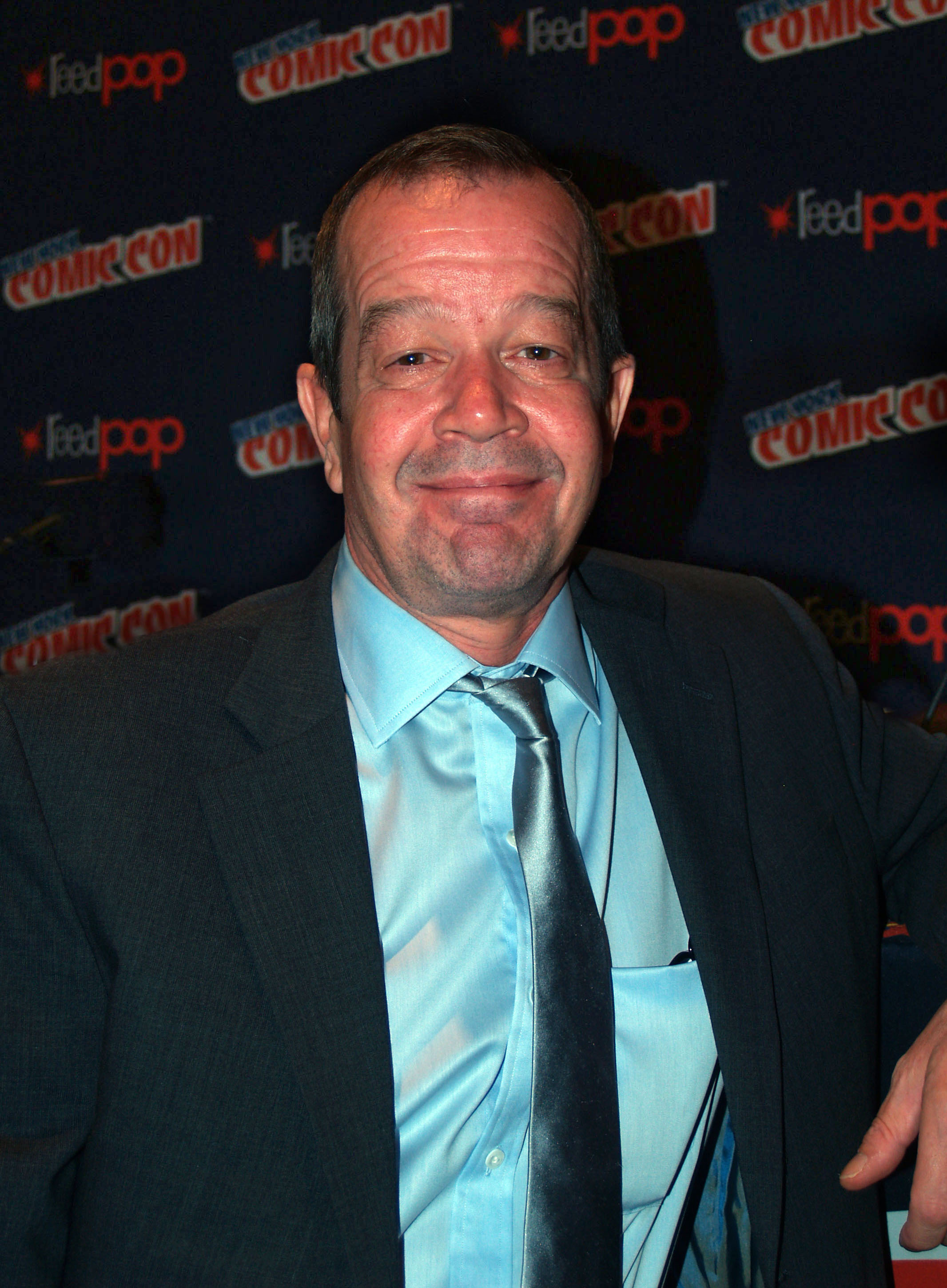
- Cooke at the 2013 New York Comic Con
- Born: November 16, 1962 Toronto, Ontario, Canada
- Died: May 14, 2016 (aged 53) Safety Harbor, Florida, U.S.
- Areas: Cartoonist, Writer, Penciller, Inker, Letterer
- Notable works: Batman/The Spirit; Catwoman; DC: The New Frontier; Richard Stark's Parker: The Hunter; The Spirit
- Awards: 13 Eisner Awards; 8 Harvey Awards; 5 Joe Shuster Awards
- Spouses: Marsha Stagg (m. 2012–2016; his death)

Darwyn Cooke (November 16, 1962 – May 14, 2016) was a Canadian comics artist, writer, cartoonist, and animator who worked on the comic books Catwoman, DC: The New Frontier, The Spirit and Richard Stark's Parker: The Hunter. His work has been honoured with numerous Eisner, Harvey, and Joe Shuster Awards.

== Early life ==
Darwyn Cooke was born in Toronto on November 16, 1962. Cooke's father was a construction worker and later ran a union.

Cooke's interest in creating comics began after watching Batman starring Adam West. Cooke's grandmother saved some of his earliest drawings, at 5 years old, of Batman and Robin in crayon on construction paper, with Cooke keeping them after her death. He discovered comics as a child, but did not become passionate about them until he was a teenager.

Cooke's desire to be an artist crystallized at 13 years old after reading a reprint of The Spectacular Spider-Man #2 (Nov. 1968), with Cooke purchasing markers and boards the day after reading the comic and attempting to copy John Romita's artwork. The following week, Cooke purchased Detective Comics #439 (Feb./March 1974), featuring the story "Night of the Stalker," and had found his calling. Cooke also recalled tracing panels of Will Eisner's The Spirit as a teenager. He attributed the ability to develop his own style as a byproduct of limited entertainment choices, allowing him to focus on deconstructing the comics that inspired him. His father, however, did not think that comics were a good avenue for a career.

Cooke attended George Brown College, but was expelled after a year.

== Career ==
In 1985, Cooke left his family on his own for the first time in order to show his samples at DC Comics' New York City offices. The trip resulted in his first published comic book work as a professional artist in a five-page crime story in DC Comics' New Talent Showcase #19, which was coincidentally edited by "Night of the Stalker" artist Sal Amendola. Economic pressure, however, made Cooke leave comics, as he was only paid $35 per page and produced one page a week. Deciding that comics was not an economically feasible job, Cooke worked in Canada as a magazine art director, graphic and product designer for the next 15 years. He eventually established his own design studio.

=== Animation ===
==== DC Animated Universe ====
In the early 1990s, Cooke decided to return to comics, but found little interest for his work at the major publishers. Eventually, he was hired by Warner Bros. Animation after replying to an ad for storyboard artists in The Comics Journal placed by animator Bruce Timm, with Cooke shocked that there were positions available. His successful pitch included 14 pages that eventually would be published in 2000 as Batman: Ego.

Originally freelancing from Toronto, Cooke met his animation colleagues at San Diego Comic-Con and was approached about moving to Los Angeles full-time. Despite no desire to live in Los Angeles, Cooke moved there to take advantage of "an opportunity to be a part of something that was never going to come around again this way," the ability to associate with creators such as Bruce Timm, Paul Dini, Alan Burnett, and Eric Radomski. Cooke worked as a storyboard artist for four episodes of The New Batman Adventures as well as a handful of episodes of Superman: The Animated Series.

In 1999, he designed and animated the opening sequence for Batman Beyond. In contrast to most cartoon openings—which adapt music to a finalized group of shots—Batman Beyond's visuals were specifically cut to suit the music, after Cooke's successful pitch of the concept to Bruce Timm. Surprisingly, Cooke employed his personal Macintosh computer in his spare bedroom and Adobe After Effects for most of the animation, as opposed to Warner Bros.' resources. According to Cooke, the Batman Beyond team created a strong show in light of what he considered "kind of a disheartening mandate from the network," which wanted a show about the Batman of the future. He believed the WB Network ultimately disliked the show's level of violence and prematurely ended the show once it could be syndicated. Cooke then worked as a director for Sony Animation's Men in Black: The Series for a year.

In April 2014, Cooke released a Batman Beyond animated short celebrating the 75th anniversary of Batman.

==== Justice League: The New Frontier ====
In July 2006, it was announced that Warner Bros. Animation and DC Comics would release a series of direct-to-DVD DC Universe Animated Original Movies based on important DC comic books. Due to the adamance of DC's then-Senior Vice-president of Creative Affairs Gregory Noveck, the second film to be adapted was Cooke's DC: The New Frontier, produced by Bruce Timm.

Due to Cooke's obligations on The Spirit, Stan Berkowitz wrote the film, while Cooke storyboarded ten percent of the film, rewrote and polished dialogue, as well as provided art direction and most of the character design. Cooke praised both Berkowitz and Timm for their ability to preserve many important character moments within the necessary shortening of the story to accommodate the film's runtime, shifting the movie's focus specifically to the Justice League characters. During the scripting process, Cooke intervened to preserve both Wonder Woman and Lois Lane's places in the film, which had originally been eliminated due to time constraints. Without them, Cooke joked that "We might as well just rename this 'White Guys in the '50s,' because everything else is gone," describing the women as "the heart of the story."

Cooke also admitted fearing for the film's outcome until he learned that his former Warner colleague David Bullock would be directing it, praising Bullock as "probably the only person in the world I would have picked ahead of myself to direct it." He also credited his strong previous relationships at Warner Bros. with his comfort on the project.

=== DC Comics ===
In the late 1990s, DC Comics art director Mark Chiarello discovered Cooke's years-old proposal for a Batman story while throwing out old pitches, and hired Cooke for what became the 2000 graphic novel Batman: Ego, marking Cooke's permanent move from animation to comics at 37 years old. Described by Cooke as "What if Batman and Bruce Wayne were able to sit down and talk about what it is they do?", the internal dialogue of Batman: Ego between Bruce Wayne and Batman was inspired by the 1981 film My Dinner with Andre.

==== Catwoman ====
In 2001, Cooke and writer Ed Brubaker revamped the Catwoman character. They started with a four-issue serial "Trail of the Catwoman" in Detective Comics #759–762 in which private detective Slam Bradley attempts to investigate the death of Selina Kyle (a.k.a. Catwoman). According to Cooke, he and Brubaker bonded over the re-introduction of Bradley, who first appeared in 1937's Detective Comics #1 and pre-dated the super-hero era of comics. The story led into a new Catwoman title in late 2001 by Brubaker and Cooke, in which the character's costume, supporting cast, and modus operandi were all redesigned and redeveloped. Cooke would stay on the series until issue #4. In 2002, he would write and draw the Selina's Big Score prequel which detailed what had happened to the character directly before her new series. Cooke regarded Selina's Big Score as the "single thing I did that I liked the most." While developing DC: The New Frontier, Cooke also drew a short Catwoman back-up story within 2002's Just Imagine Stan Lee with Chris Bachalo creating Catwoman. An untold story concept Cooke held onto involved the return and revenge of Catwoman's betrayed ex-lover Stark in a similar manner to the lead character of the film Point Blank.

Cooke was the first-ever signer for CGC's Signature Series, a witness-based authentication system proposed by Paradise Comics owner Peter Dixon where on-site representatives visually verified signings and sketches as an additional form of certification. For Paradise Comics' Toronto event in November 2001, Cooke autographed 80 copies of Catwoman #1 (2001), which he had illustrated.

==== DC: The New Frontier ====
Cover to DC: The New Frontier #6 (Nov. 2004).

Cooke's next project was 2004's DC: The New Frontier, a six-issue miniseries which bridged the gap between the end of the golden and the start of the silver age of comic books in the DC Universe. Cooke began brainstorming The New Frontier after completing Batman: Ego and being steered by Mark Chiarello to do a Justice League story. Preferring not to write a story tied to modern continuity or with short-term consequences, Cooke quickly realized he had little interest in writing about the Justice League unless the focus was on "who they were before they became the Justice League."

The story, set in the 1950s, featured dozens of super-heroes and drew inspiration from the period's comic books and movies as well as Tom Wolfe's non-fiction account of the start of the U.S. space program The Right Stuff and the novels of James Ellroy due to Ellroy's skill in weaving fictional characters into real history. The major DC characters are introduced in The New Frontier in the same order that DC originally published them, even down to the correct month and year in the story's timeline. For the book's visual style, Cooke was inspired by 1950s advertising along with the works of Marvel Comics' Jack Kirby and Hanna-Barbera's Alex Toth.

As Cooke formulated The New Frontier, DC's editorial board pushed major changes from Cooke's original concept including accommodations for DC Comics' present-day continuity; the mandated changes were undone by Paul Levitz, who allowed Cooke to preserve his original intent both by setting the story out of continuity as well as offering Cooke an advance payment on his work. Cooke subsequently worked on Catwoman and Selina's Big Score before returning to work on The New Frontier.

Cooke employed non-linear narrative that increasingly tied together toward the conclusion, likening the approach to films like Memento, Pulp Fiction, and The Limey.

Cooke placed a significant focus on Green Lantern Hal Jordan, intending to illustrate "why the character was cool" in light of the character's dramatic changes in the 1994 "Emerald Twilight" story arc, which he regarded as a wholly out-of-place gimmick for Jordan to merely boost sales. To be accurate regarding Jordan's role as a United States Air Force pilot, Cooke spoke with two fighter pilots as well as fellow comic writer and artist Mike Allred, who had previously been stationed in Germany while serving in the Air Force.

While clarifying that he did not approve of John F. Kennedy's personal flaws, Cooke cited Kennedy's 1960 "New Frontier" speech—which both inspired the title and concluded the book—as "the first time [the promise of modern America] was ever properly articulated."

For 2006's collected Absolute Edition of the series, Cooke proposed including up to 48 additional pages, later negotiated down to 13 in order to hit a 400-page page count. The additional material provided more backstory for the Flash and J'onn J'onnz, as well as the Suicide Squad on Dinosaur Island. Cooke admitted surprise at this deluxe edition being released so soon after the original release due to retailer demand, citing a three-year wait for an Absolute Edition of Alan Moore's The League of Extraordinary Gentlemen.

In a 2014 interview, New Frontier co-editor Chiarello named the book as the work he was the most proud of his involvement in, calling it "as pure a comic-reading experience as any comic that's ever been published."

==== Other projects ====
Solo #5 (Aug. 2005), featuring Slam Bradley. Cover art by Cooke.

In 2004, Cooke also contributed to DC's artist-centric anthology project Solo. His issue (#5, Aug. 2005) featured several different stories in different styles with a framing sequence featuring Slam Bradley, and was originally intended by Cooke to be his final mainstream comic before other palatable DC projects pulled him back. In 2006, Solo #5 won an Eisner Award for "Best Single Issue."

In November 2006, Cooke and writer Jeph Loeb produced a Batman/The Spirit intercompany crossover. This was followed in December by an ongoing Spirit series written and drawn by Cooke. At the time, Cooke considered The Spirit "the most exciting and horrifying offer I'd been made in my career," and later described himself as "incredibly reluctant to step into [Spirit creator Will] Eisner's shoes," despite it "paining him" when he was younger that he might never professionally draw the character. Cooke also expressed regret that he—while having met Will Eisner in the past—never got to consult with Eisner specifically for The Spirit; Eisner had died in 2005. Along with adding new characters such as Ginger Coffee and Hussein Hussein, Cooke revised Ellen Dolan and Ebony White, in particular discarding White's exaggerated blackface-inspired appearance and dialect. In June 2007, Cooke and J. Bone won a Joe Shuster Award for "Outstanding Canadian Comic Book Artists" for their work on Batman/The Spirit, and Cooke won "Outstanding Canadian Comic Book Cartoonist" for his work on The Spirit. Despite intending a second year of the series, Cooke announced at the 2007 San Diego Comic-Con that his run on The Spirit would conclude after one year, after artist J. Bone had to step down, and an editorial reshuffle at DC moved editors Scott Dunbier and Kristy Quinn from the book, believing that resulting quality would not be up to his standards.

Cooke also wrote the first six-issue story arc of the Superman monthly series Superman Confidential, which debuted on November 1, 2006, and featured stories set in Superman's early career. As Cooke developed the plot with artist Tim Sale, he realized he had no creative hook for a Superman story until discovering that, surprisingly, none had been told regarding the character's early fear and uncertainty at the limits of his invulnerability. In June 2007, Cooke was awarded the Joe Shuster Award for "Outstanding Canadian Comic Book Writer" for Superman Confidential. Feeling more comfortable with human characters like Catwoman and Batman, Cooke nonetheless had pitched one other unrealized Superman graphic novel around 2002 in collaboration with artist and future Justice League: The New Frontier director David Bullock.

In 2008, Cooke collaborated with Jimmy Palmiotti and Justin Gray on an issue of Jonah Hex out of a desire to work with the pair, write a Western story, as well as craft a cliché-breaking tale for Hex set within Canada. Cooke playfully made fun of American conventional wisdom that Canadian weather was always a blizzard, but accepted the premise as a central plot element.

Cooke was the writer/artist of Before Watchmen: Minutemen and the writer of Before Watchmen: Silk Spectre in 2012–2013. After originally being pitched to author the entire Before Watchmen series, Cooke was able to reduce his commitment to only two books, eventually accepting the project after successfully conceptualizing the Minutemen series. Cooke did not view Watchmen as "the Holy Grail" of comics, nor did he feel concerned about original Watchmen author Alan Moore's opinion on the Before Watchmen series, but he did initially turn down the project for two years out of concern that his work would not measure up either to the original book or its reputation within the comics industry.

In 2015, an oversized compilation of selected Cooke-illustrated DC stories and covers was published, Graphic Ink: The DC Comics Art of Darwyn Cooke.

==== Vertigo ====
Vertigo editor Shelly Bond encouraged Cooke to produce a collaborative work. Cooke proposed Gilbert Hernandez as the writer, believing Hernandez would not be interested. Their collaboration, The Twilight Children, takes place in a Latin American fishing village and mixes elements of science fiction and magic realism. The lives of the villagers are disrupted by a sudden increase in supernatural activity and an influx of suspicious investigators.

=== Marvel Comics ===
While preparing for DC: The New Frontier and before creating Selina's Big Score, the success of Batman: Ego led Cooke to Marvel Comics freelance work such as X-Force, Wolverine/Doop and Spider-Man's Tangled Web.

Cooke later had a falling out with Marvel and then-Senior Editor Axel Alonso after Marvel solicited and praised his business plan for the Marvel Adventures children's line, yet subsequently passed it onto other creators without the company's communication or his involvement.

=== IDW Publishing ===
In July 2009, IDW Publishing published Cooke's Richard Stark's Parker: The Hunter, an adaptation of the Donald Westlake novel, The Hunter, the first of four Parker novels Cooke adapted for IDW. The second, The Outfit, was released in October 2010, The Score was released in July 2012, and Slayground was published in December 2013, with Cooke handling the entire art direction and physical design.

=== Image Comics ===
In January 2015, Image Comics announced a three-part fully creator-owned project by Cooke entitled Revengeance, originally intended to launch June 2015. Compared by Cooke to Mickey Spillane's I, the Jury, the psychological thriller and dark comedy had been tentatively titled Thunder Bay, and was to be set in Toronto in 1986.

Cooke initially pitched the art duties to Tim Sale, but decided to take them up himself after an unsuccessful five-year wait for Sale's availability. Revengeance, however, remained unreleased at the time of Cooke's death in 2016.

== Personal life ==
Cooke married Marsha Stagg in Las Vegas, Nevada in November 2012 and lived in western Florida.

His personal favorite film was The Wizard of Oz, which he described as "the first movie to scare me [and] ignite my imagination."

== Death ==
On May 13, 2016, Cooke's wife announced on his official blog that he was battling an "aggressive" form of cancer, stating, "It is with tremendous sadness that we announce Darwyn is now receiving palliative care following a bout with aggressive cancer. His brother Dennis and I, along with our families appreciate the outpouring of support we have received. We ask for privacy as we go through this very difficult time." Cooke died the next morning.

Comic creators such as Dan DiDio, Brian Michael Bendis, Gail Simone, Jimmy Palmiotti, Ed Brubaker, and Mark Waid expressed condolences, reminisced on working with Cooke, and made recommendations of Cooke's works to fans.

== Legacy ==
Upon Cooke's death, DC Comics issued a statement describing Cooke as "one of our medium's true innovators," comparing his "bold, direct style" with Joe Kubert, Alex Toth, and Jack Kirby.

Cooke acknowledged himself as difficult to work with, a trait that was ultimately recognized as beneficial by his comic book industry peers. Artist Cliff Chiang noted that Cooke's uncompromising nature "opened doors for lots of us."

== Awards and honors ==
Cooke won thirteen Eisner Awards, eight Harvey Awards, and five Joe Shuster Awards for works produced for DC Comics and IDW Publishing, primarily for DC: The New Frontier and Richard Stark's Parker. In a 2007 interview, Cooke admitted to—while appreciating them—not paying much attention to awards. However, upon winning his first Eisner Award in 2005 for DC: The New Frontier, Cooke did feel gratification for his pursuit of comics as a career and understood that he was genuinely on the right path.

=== Eisner Awards ===
Mainstream comics can be engaging without having to go down the grim 'n' gritty road. I've tried to create books that remind us that stories should entertain, not stunts or character assassination. [...] I've done my best to remind us that superhero and adventure comics weren't always the greasy affair they've become. It is by definition a hopeful genre aimed at the young at heart, and those are the stories I've tried to tell.

— Darwyn Cooke, Comics Journal #285
- Best Finite Series/Limited Series – 2005 DC: The New Frontier, by Darwyn Cooke (DC)
- Best Single Issue/Single Story – 2006 Solo #5 by Darwyn Cooke (DC)
- Best Single Issue/Single Story – 2007 Batman/The Spirit #1 by Jeph Loeb and Darwyn Cooke (DC)
- Best Graphic Album: Reprint – 2007 Absolute DC: The New Frontier, by Darwyn Cooke (DC)
- Best Publication Design – 2007 Absolute DC: The New Frontier, designed by Darwyn Cooke (DC)
- Best Adaptation from Another Work – 2010 Richard Stark's Parker: The Hunter, adapted by Darwyn Cooke (IDW)
- Best Writer/Artist – 2011 Darwyn Cooke, Richard Stark's Parker: The Outfit (IDW)
- Best Graphic Album: Reprint – 2012 Richard Stark's Parker: The Martini Edition, by Darwyn Cooke (IDW)
- Best Short Story – 2012 "The Seventh" by Darwyn Cooke, in Richard Stark's Parker: The Martini Edition (IDW)
- Best Adaptation from Another Medium – 2013 Richard Stark's Parker: The Score, adapted by Darwyn Cooke (IDW)
- Best Adaptation from Another Medium – 2014 Richard Stark's Parker: Slayground, by Donald Westlake, adapted by Darwyn Cooke (IDW)
- Best Letterer/Lettering – 2014 Darwyn Cooke, Richard Stark's Parker: Slayground (IDW)
- Best Cover Artist – 2015 Darwyn Cooke, DC Comics Darwyn Cooke Month Variant Covers (DC)

=== Harvey Awards ===
- Best Artist or Penciller – 2005 Darwyn Cooke, for DC: The New Frontier (DC)
- Best Continuing or Limited Series – 2005 DC: The New Frontier, by Darwyn Cooke (DC)
- Best Graphic Album of Previously Published Work – 2007 Absolute New Frontier by Darwyn Cooke (DC)
- Best Cartoonist (Writer/Artist) – 2008 Darwyn Cooke, for The Spirit (DC)
- Best Cartoonist (Writer/Artist) – 2010 Darwyn Cooke, for Richard Stark's Parker: The Hunter (IDW)
- Best Artist or Penciller – 2011 Darwyn Cooke, for Richard Stark's Parker: The Outfit (IDW)
- Best Cartoonist (Writer/Artist) – 2011 Darwyn Cooke, for Richard Stark's Parker: The Outfit (IDW)
- Best Graphic Album of Original Work – 2013 Richard Stark's Parker: The Score, by Darwyn Cooke (IDW)
- Harvey Awards Hall of Fame – 2017 (posthumously inducted)

=== Joe Shuster Awards ===
- Outstanding Cartoonist (writer and artist) – 2005 Darwyn Cooke for DC: The New Frontier (DC)
- Outstanding Artist – 2007 Darwyn Cooke and J. Bone for Batman/The Spirit #1 (DC)
- Outstanding Cartoonist (writer and artist) – 2007 Darwyn Cooke for The Spirit #1 (DC)
- Outstanding Writer – 2007 Darwyn Cooke for Superman Confidential #1–2 (DC)
- Outstanding Cover – 2010 Darwyn Cooke for Richard Stark's Parker: The Hunter (IDW)

== Bibliography ==
=== As penciller or writer/penciller ===
- 9–11: The World's Finest Comic Book Writers & Artists Tell Stories to Remember, Volume Two (2002).
- All-Star Western #34 (DC, 2014). Artist.
- Batman: Ego (DC, 2000). A 64-page prestige format Batman story. Writer and artist.
- Batman/The Spirit (DC, 2006). One-shot crossover issue between Batman and The Spirit, featuring some of the supporting casts of both characters (Robin, Catwoman, the Joker, Ebony, P'Gell, Commissioner Dolan and more). Co-written by Cooke and Jeph Loeb, and penciled by Cooke.
- Before Watchmen: Minutemen #1–6 (DC, 2012). Writer and artist.
- Catwoman vol. 3 #1–4 (DC, 2001–2002). With writer Ed Brubaker.
- Catwoman: Selina's Big Score (DC, 2002). 96-page graphic novel featuring a Selina Kyle story that takes place before Catwoman vol. 3 #1.
- Creator-Owned Heroes #6–8 (Image, 2012–2013). Cooke wrote and drew three short stories.
- DC: The New Frontier #1–6 (DC, 2004). Writer and artist.
- Green Lantern: Secret Files 2005 (DC, 2005). Cooke pencils the main story (22 pages), written by Geoff Johns.
- Jonah Hex vol. 2 #33, 50 (DC, 2008–2009). Artist.
- Justice League: The New Frontier Special (DC, 2008).
- Revengeance (Image, unfinished/never published).
- Richard Stark's Parker: The Hunter (IDW, 2009) Adapted from the novel by Richard Stark, illustrated by Cooke. (ISBN 1-6001-0493-2)
- Richard Stark's Parker: The Man With the Getaway Face – A Prelude to The Outfit (IDW, 2010) Oversized (8" x 12") one-shot adapted from the novel by Richard Stark, illustrated by Cooke. Later republished as the first chapter in Richard Stark's Parker: The Outfit.
- Richard Stark's Parker: The Outfit (IDW, 2010) Adapted from the novel by Richard Stark, illustrated by Cooke. (ISBN 1-6001-0762-1)
- Richard Stark's Parker: The Score (IDW, 2012) Adapted from the novel by Richard Stark, illustrated by Cooke. (ISBN 1-6137-7208-4)
- Richard Stark's Parker: Slayground (IDW, 2013) Adapted from the novel by Richard Stark, illustrated by Cooke. (ISBN 1-6137-7812-0)
- Rocketeer Adventures #2 (IDW, 2011). Cooke wrote and drew the seven-page story, "Betty Saves the Day!"
- Solo #5 (DC, 2005).
- Spider-Man's Tangled Web #11, 21 (Marvel, 2002–2003). Cooke wrote and drew "Open All Night!", a Spider-Man Valentine's Day story, and "T'was the Fight Before Xmas", a Spider-Man Christmas story.
- The Spirit #1–6, 8–12 (DC, 2006–2008). Writer and artist.
- The Twilight Children #1–4 (Vertigo, 2016). With writer Gilbert Hernandez.
- Weird War Tales War One-Shot #1 (DC, 2010). Cooke wrote and drew "Armistice Night."
- Wolverine/Doop #1–2 (Marvel, 2003). Two-issue miniseries written by Peter Milligan that co-stars X-Men's Wolverine and X-Force's Doop.
- X-Force #124 (Marvel, 2002). With writer Peter Milligan.

=== Backup stories as penciller ===
- Batman: Gotham Knights #23 (DC, 2001). A Batman Black and White backup tale.
- Detective Comics #759–762 (DC, 2001). Four-part "Trail of the Catwoman" back-up story (8 pages in each issue), featuring Sam Bradley, that leads to Catwoman #1.
- JSA: All Stars #3 (DC, 2003). Doctor Fate back-up story.
- Just Imagine Stan Lee with Chris Bachalo creating Catwoman (2002). Cooke drew a short back up story written by Michael Uslan and inked by Mike Allred.
- Legion Worlds #2 (DC, 2001). Eight-page back-up story.
- Marvel Double Shot #3 (2002). "Who Let the Dad Out?", an eleven-page Ant-Man story.
- X-Statix #1 (2002). Doop back-up story.

=== As writer ===
- Batman: Gotham Knights #33 (DC, 2002). Writer of the back-up story "The Monument", with artist Bill Wray.
- Before Watchmen: Silk Spectre #1–4 (DC, 2012). With artist Amanda Conner.
- Solo #1 (DC, 2004). 11-page story "Date Knight", featuring Batman and Catwoman, with artist Tim Sale.
- Superman Confidential #1–5, 11 (DC, 2006–2008). "Kryptonite," written by Cooke with art by Tim Sale.

=== Cover work ===
- All-Star Western #28–#29 (DC, 2014)
- Aquaman #37 (DC, 2014)
- Back Issue! #28 (TwoMorrows Publishing, 2008)
- Bad Girls #1–#5 (DC, 2003–2004)
- Batgirl #37 (DC, 2014)
- Batman #37 (DC, 2014)
- Batman and Robin #37 (DC, 2014)
- Batman & Superman in World's Finest: The Silver Age Omnibus vol. 1 (DC, 2016)
- Batman Beyond #4, vol. 2 #23–#24, vol. 4 #1 (DC, 1999–2011)
- Batman: The Golden Age Omnibus vol. 1, vol. 2, vol. 3 (DC, 2015–2017)
- Batman: Gotham Adventures #45, #50 (DC, 2002)
- Batman: Gotham Knights #12 (DC, 2001)
- Batman/Superman #17 (DC, 2014)
- Batwing #24, #26–#27 (DC, 2013–2014)
- Catwoman #37, #46 (DC, 2014–2016)
- Comic Book Artist #3 (Top Shelf Productions, 2004)
- The Comics Journal #285 (Fantagraphics Books, 2007)
- Detective Comics vol. 2 #37 (DC, 2014)
- Elk's Run tpb (Speakeasy, 2006)
- The Flash vol. 3 #7 (DC, 2011)
- Grayson #5 (DC, 2014)
- Green Lantern #37 (DC, 2014)
- Green Lantern Corps #37 (DC, 2014)
- The Grimoire #4 (Speakeasy Comics, 2005)
- He-Man: The Eternity War #1 (DC, 2014)
- Invincible Returns #1 (Image, 2010)
- It Girl! and the Atomics #2 (Image, 2012)
- iZombie #1 (Vertigo, 2010)
- Jersey Gods #2 (Image, 2009)
- Jonah Hex #56 (DC, 2010)
- Justice League #33, #37 (DC, 2014)
- Justice League Adventures #7 (DC, 2002)
- Justice League Dark #37 (DC, 2014)
- Justice League United #7 (DC, 2014)
- Justice Society of America #50, #54 (DC, 2011)
- The Last Resort #1–#4 (IDW, 2009)
- Lorna: Relic Wrangler #1 (Image, 2011)
- Mirror Mirror (Kickstart Comics, 2010)
- The Murder of King Tut #1–#5 (IDW, 2010)
- Painkiller Jane #3 (Dynamite Entertainment, 2007)
- Rawhide Kid #4 (Marvel, 2003)
- Red Menace #1 (WildStorm, 2007)
- Rocketeer Adventures 2 #1–#4 (IDW, 2012)
- Season of the Witch #2 (Image, 2005)
- The Shade #4 variant cover (DC, 2012)
- Sinestro #8 (DC, 2014)
- Spellgame #1–#4 (Speakeasy, 2005)
- The Spirit #13 (DC, 2008)
- Stephen Colbert's Tek Jansen #3 (Oni Press, 2008)
- Supergirl #37 (DC, 2014)
- Supergirl: The Silver Age Omnibus Vol. 1 (DC, 2016)
- Superman #37 (DC, 2014)
- Superman: The Golden Age Omnibus vol. 1–2 (DC, 2013 & 2016)
- Superman/Wonder Woman #14 (DC, 2014)
- Teen Titans #5 (DC, 2014)
- T.H.U.N.D.E.R. Agents vol. 3 #1 (DC, 2011)
- Torpedo Volumes 1–2 hc (IDW, 2010)
- Weird Western Tales #1 (Vertigo, 2001)
- Wonder Woman #37 (DC, 2014)
- Wool #1–#6 (Cryptozoic, 2014)

== Screenwriting ==
=== Television ===
- Justice League Unlimited (2005)
- DC Nation Shorts: Batman Beyond (2014)

=== Film ===
- Justice League: The New Frontier (2008): additional material
