= The Twilight Children =

Comic book

- Date: 2016
- No. of issues: 4
- Publisher: Vertigo

Creative team
- Writer: Gilbert Hernández
- Artist: Darwyn Cooke
- Colourist: Dave Stewart
- Editor: Shelly Bond

Original publication
- Date of publication: October 2015 – January 2016

The Twilight Children is a comic book limited series written by American cartoonist Gilbert Hernández (of Love and Rockets fame) and drawn by the late Canadian master cartoonist Darwyn Cooke. Vertigo published the four-issue series from October 2015 to January 2016.

== Summary ==
The story takes place in a Latin American fishing village and mixes elements of science fiction and magic realism. The lives of the villagers are disrupted by mysterious glowing orbs that appear just offshore. When three children investigate a white orb that washes up, it explodes, rendering all of them blind, but gives them psychic abilities. This suspected supernatural activity is succeeded by an influx of suspicious investigators including the American CIA (recognized by all in the village as shady spy-types up to no good). Ela, a possibly alien, mute woman with glowing white hair appears, wandering around the area as a young scientist becomes enamored with her.

== Production ==
Vertigo editor Shelly Bond encouraged Cooke to produce a collaborative work. Cooke proposed Hernández, who accepted to write a series. Dave Stewart colored the work.

Some have typified the story as a comic book expressing a low-budget B-movie, typically seen in 1970s rendered by Cooke in his 1960s comics style. This highly symbolic story is the last one published by Darwyn Cooke.

== Publication ==
The first issue of the four-issue series débuted from Vertigo in October 2015, with a December cover date. It was one of a dozen titles Vertigo launched that month. The last issue appeared in January 2016 with a March cover date. Following serialization it has been republished in a collected edition.
