= Brent Bradshaw =

American screenwriter

Brent Bradshaw is a television writer and performer who has contributed to such programs as The Man Show, The MTV Movie Awards, Comedy Central's Crank Yankers, The Andy Milonakis Show, Adult Swim on Cartoon Network, and NBC's Last Call with Carson Daly.

Bradshaw was born in Fayetteville, Arkansas, and attended Rogers High School before continuing his studies at the University of Arkansas.
