= Richard Stark's Parker: The Hunter =

Book by Darwyn Cooke

- Main characters: Parker
- Page count: 144 pages
- Publisher: IDW Publishing

Creative team
- Writers: Darwyn Cooke (Donald E. Westlake)
- Artists: Darwyn Cooke
- ISBN: 978-1600104930

Richard Stark's Parker: The Hunter is a 2009 graphic novel by Darwyn Cooke, an adaptation of the first Parker novel The Hunter written by Donald E. Westlake under the pseudonym Richard Stark.

== Publication history ==
In July 2009, IDW Publishing published Cooke's Richard Stark's Parker: The Hunter, an adaptation of the Donald Westlake novel, The Hunter, the first of four Parker novels Cooke adapted for IDW. The second, The Outfit, was released in October 2010, The Score was released in July 2012, and Slayground was published in December 2013, with Cooke handling the entire art direction and physical design.

At the time of The Outfit's release, Cooke said "I can see [Parker] being a part of what I do for a long time," beyond IDW's four planned books. Cooke completed the eight-year contract for the Parker series' four titles in only four years, which led to Cooke anticipating at least one future project, Butcher's Moon, that was ultimately never made due to Cooke's death.

== Background and creation ==
After Cooke's preliminary Parker drawings struck Westlake as too hot-headed, Cooke's next approach resonated with the author as "on the right track." Cooke described Westlake as "really forthcoming" after initially contacting him, and believed he gained Westlake's support after assuring him that the comic adaptation would take place in the same time period as the books and "maintain as much of the prose as possible." Cooke noted that Westlake mentioned that one of his early cover ideas was "too violent," and told him Parker committed violence not out of anger, but expedience.

Though Westlake was able to discuss story and characters with Cooke during the initial development of The Hunter, Cooke did not want to pester Westlake due to the author's advanced age. Cooke lost the ability to further work with Westlake after the author's passing in December 2008, with Westlake never seeing the finished product or contributing to new scenes exclusive to the comic adaptation. Cooke felt the loss of Westlake made the series "a little less pure" due to Cooke authoring some original dialogue, believing "[Westlake's characters] would have been better with his help." According to Cooke, Westlake saw much of the development artwork and "there was no question that he was happy to have the name on the graphic novel."

The art was finished via watercolor and brush, with Cooke intending a consistent look for the four titles. Cooke deliberately took time committing to the art style, referring to his approach as a "visual shorthand that best tells this type of story" and noting that the style's roots were in his stories for Slam Bradley and Catwoman: Selina's Big Score. Cooke kept scenes dark and reserved, a choice he viewed as more authentic compared to Parker film adaptations, which typically went for exaggerated visuals, even noting that he had to get past his Warner Bros. Animation training and knowledge of the Marvel method, which both encouraged amping up the art when interpreting a script. For The Outfit, Cooke spent six months on research, character design, thumbnails, and editing, while the actual process of drawing was described by Cooke as "shorter than most people would think" at around four months of work. Once ready to draw, Cooke would pencil, ink, letter, and paint without going back to undo mistakes, channeling Westlake's own practice of writing the Parker novels as he went along.

After The Hunter, Cooke changed some of Parker's facial design—originally derived from Westlake's visual reference of a young Jack Palance—using "plastic surgery as a metaphor for his emotional regression," while retaining the jaw and eyes.

In discussing The Outfit, Cooke praised Westlake's detailed process descriptions of criminal racketeering, descriptions that led Cooke to develop different art styles for the crime stories falling outside of the Parker narrative. The crime stories' art styles were inspired by his "favorite comic book of this century," Daniel Clowes' Ice Haven, as well as Noel Sickles' Reader's Digest illustrations, and animation studios UPA and Hanna-Barbera.

== Plot ==
Parker is betrayed by the woman he loves and double-crossed by his partner in crime, he makes his way cross-country with only one thought burning in his mind — to coldly exact his revenge and reclaim what was taken from him.

== Reception ==
Cooke credited IDW editor Scott Dunbier for The Hunter's strong promotional response; Dunbier's ideas included presenting the title to look like a traditional hardcover book, providing media advance review copies of the proper hardcover—a practice generally not used in the comics industry—as well as holding a release day press conference. One of Cooke's proudest moments for the series was The Hunter's coverage in The New York Times, something Westlake told Cooke he wanted but didn't live to see, with Westlake's widow Abby thrilled with the recognition her husband's work received.

Fellow artist Cliff Chiang praised The Hunter as "elegantly efficient" and a "seamless" adaptation, claiming that Cooke "was able to take Westlake's novel and make me feel as though it were always a comic," while writer and artist Howard Chaykin was "delighted that it finally happened in so compelling and well made a package." Cooke regarded criticisms that The Hunter was "bloodless" as likely from people who had not read the original books, explaining that the books' moments of violence were ruthless, efficient, unemotional non-events meant to punctuate a moment or set up the next set of challenges.

The comic book oriented video and audio podcast iFanboy named Parker: The Hunter as a "Book of the Month". In December 2009, iFanboy named Parker: The Hunter the 2009 "Book of the Year".
