= Toronto Comicon =

Cultural convention

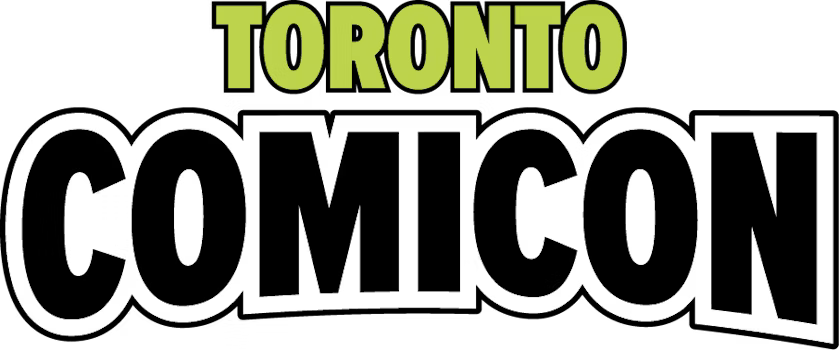
- Status: Active
- Genre: Speculative fiction
- Venue: Metro Toronto Convention Centre
- Locations: Toronto, Ontario
- Country: Canada
- Inaugurated: 2001
- Most recent: Ongoing
- Organizer: Hobby Star Marketing, Inc. (2001–2013); Fan Expo HQ/Informa Connect (2013–present)
- Website: http://www.comicontoronto.com

Toronto Comicon (currently stylized as Toronto Comicon, previously as Toronto ComiCon) is an annual comic book and pop culture convention held in Toronto, Ontario, Canada at the Metro Toronto Convention Centre since 2001. It is owned and operated by Informa's Fan Expo HQ.

== History ==
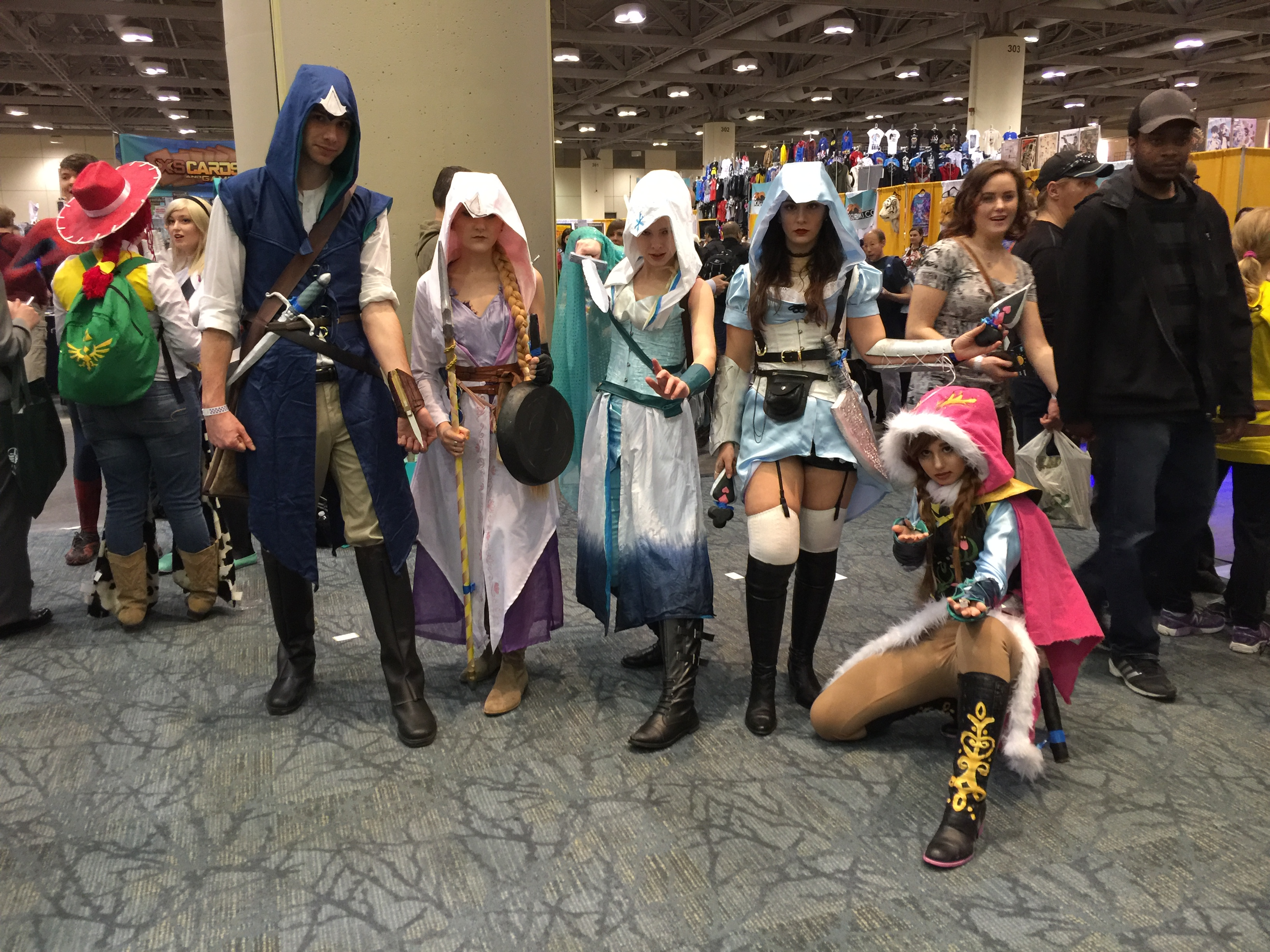
Cosplayers at Toronto Comicon 2017

From 2001 to 2012, Hobby Star Marketing, Inc. (who also ran Fan Expo Canada) held fall, spring, and winter one-day comic book conventions called the Toronto ComiCON at the Metro Toronto Convention Centre. From 2004 to 2011, the spring event was referred to as the "Fan Appreciation Event" and included free admission held in conjunction with participating Toronto-area comic book stores such as the Silver Snail. Since 2007 the annual spring Toronto Comicon has been a multi-day event, in 2012 it expanded to incorporate the annual March Toronto AnimeCon (MTAC).

Beginning in 2012, the Toronto Comicon format underwent extensive restructuring has now become a three-day event that "[boasts] unique exhibitors, presentations, workshops and many celebrity guests."

Since the changes, the convention has attracted more high-profile guests and attendance rates have increased, therefore making it a key competitor to Toronto Comic Con.

The 2020 and 2021 editions of the event were cancelled due to the COVID-19 pandemic.

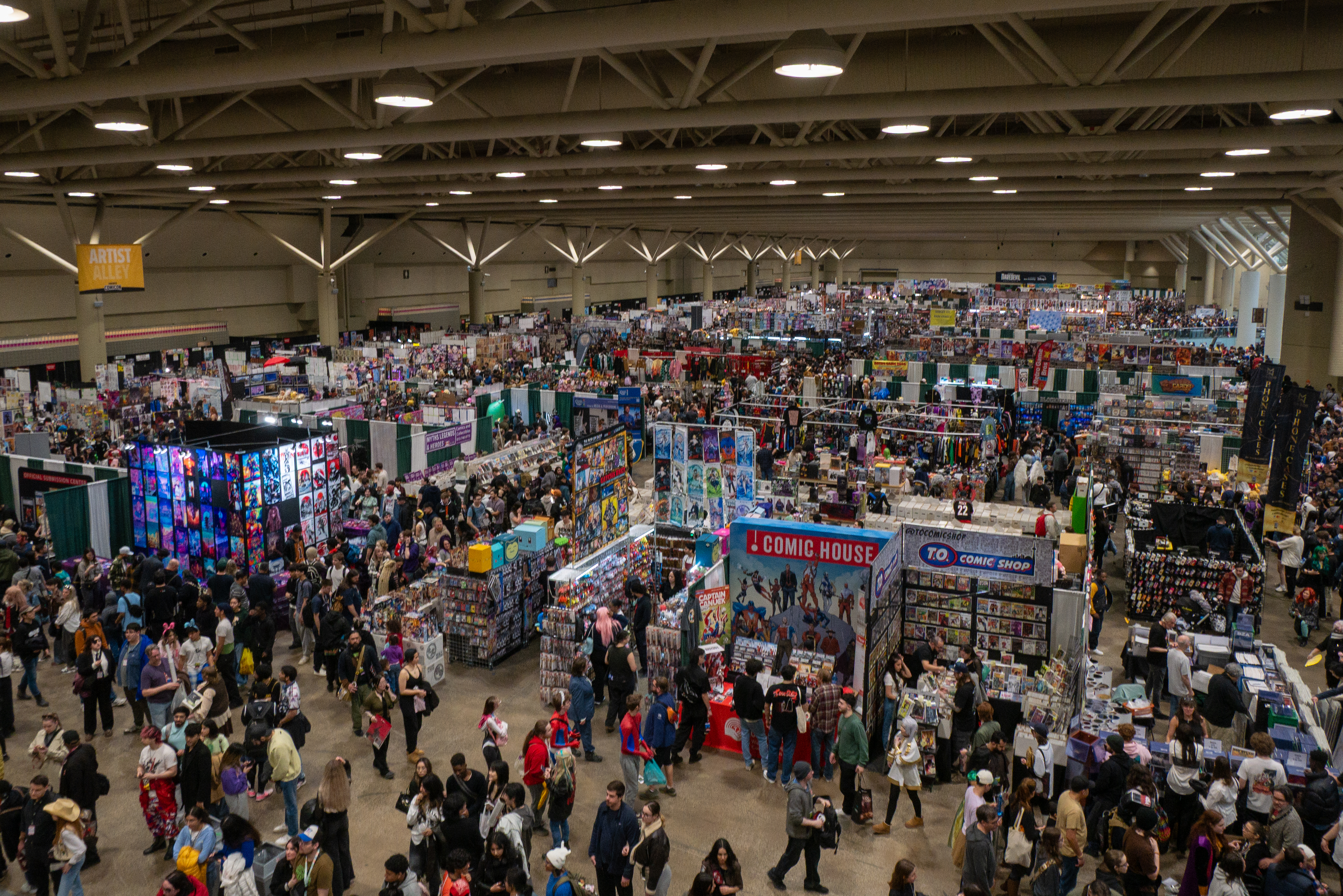
Main Convention Hall at Toronto Comicon 2025

== Dates ==
Year	Fall	Spring	Winter	Notes
2001	TK	TK	TK	
2002	TK	TK	TK	
2003	TK	TK	October 19	
2004	February 29	May 2 (Fan Appreciation)	October	
2005	February 6	April 22 (Fan Appreciation)	November 13	
2006	February 5	April 23 (Fan Appreciation)	October 22	
2007	February 4	April 13–15 (Fan Appreciation)	October 21	
2008	February 3	April 12–13 (Fan Appreciation)	November 30	
2009	February 1	April 18–19 (Fan Appreciation)	November 22	
2010	February 28	June 5–6 (Fan Appreciation)	November 21	
2011	February 1	April 9–10 (Fan Appreciation)	November 20	
2012	TK	March 10–11	November 25	
2013	TK	March 9–10	December 15	
2014	---	March 7–9	December 14	
2015	---	March 20–22	December 5	
2016	---	March 18–20	---	
2019	--	March 15–17	---	
2020	--	March 20–22	---	canceled due to the COVID-19 pandemic
2021	--	March 19–21	---	canceled due to the COVID-19 pandemic
2022	--	March 18–20	---	
2023	--	March 17–19	---	
2024	--	March 15–17	---	
2025	--	March 14–16	---	
