= Paradise Comics =

Comic book store in Canada

Coordinates: 43.730281°N 79.40375°W

- Company type: Private
- Industry: Retail
- Founded: 1991; 35 years ago
- Founder: Chris Friesen
- Headquarters: 3278 Yonge Street, Toronto, Ontario, Canada
- Area served: Toronto, Ontario, Canada
- Products: Comics
- Owner: Peter Dixon (since 1994)
- Website: www.paradisecomics.com

Paradise Comics is a comic book store located in Toronto, Ontario, Canada. The owner and proprietor is Peter Dixon.

== Paradise Comics Toronto Comicon ==
In 2003, Paradise Comics created a comic book convention, Paradise Comics Toronto Comicon, popularly known as the Toronto Comic Con. In 2009, Wizard Entertainment acquired the Paradise Comics Toronto Comicon, "a show that ha[d] been consistently awarded The Best International Comic Book Convention (non-USA) by ComicBookConventions.com, for the last five years." Peter Dixon would continue to be involved with the convention, which was renamed Wizard World Toronto. (The convention went defunct after 2012.)
